= 2012 Toronto Blue Jays season =

2012 Toronto Blue Jays
- League: American League
- Division: East
- Ballpark: Rogers Centre
- City: Toronto, Ontario
- Record: 73–89 (.451)
- Divisional place: 4th
- Owners: Rogers; Paul Beeston (CEO)
- General managers: Alex Anthopoulos
- Managers: John Farrell
- Television: Sportsnet; Sportsnet One (Buck Martinez, Pat Tabler, Alan Ashby)
- Radio: Blue Jays Radio Network; Sportsnet 590 the FAN (Jerry Howarth, Alan Ashby, Mike Wilner)

The 2012 Toronto Blue Jays season was the 36th season of Major League Baseball's Toronto Blue Jays franchise, and the 23rd full season of play (24th overall) at the Rogers Centre. Their opening game was played on April 5 against the Cleveland Indians in Cleveland. The Blue Jays finished 73–89, in fourth place in the American League East.

== New identity ==
On November 18, 2011, the Blue Jays unveiled a new logo and uniforms for the 2012 season. The logo and all-white home uniform bear a strong resemblance to the original logo and home uniforms, used from 1977 to 1996. The grey road uniform resembles those used from 1989 to 1996, and the alternate royal blue jersey—to be used for home and road games—resembles those used from 1994 to 1996, as well as the batting practice jerseys used from 1982 to 1996.

== Spring training ==
The Blue Jays had a 24–7 win–loss record in spring training, their .774 winning percentage being the best of all MLB teams during pre-season. One of their games finished tied and was therefore not included in the standings.

== Regular season ==
=== Standings ===
==== American League East ====
AL East
Team	W	L	Pct.	GB	Home	Road
New York Yankees	95	67	.586	—	51‍–‍30	44‍–‍37
Baltimore Orioles	93	69	.574	2	47‍–‍34	46‍–‍35
Tampa Bay Rays	90	72	.556	5	46‍–‍35	44‍–‍37
Toronto Blue Jays	73	89	.451	22	41‍–‍40	32‍–‍49
Boston Red Sox	69	93	.426	26	34‍–‍47	35‍–‍46

==== American League Wild Card ====
Division winners
Team	W	L	Pct.
New York Yankees	95	67	.586
Oakland Athletics	94	68	.580
Detroit Tigers	88	74	.543

Wild Card teams (Top 2 teams qualify for postseason)
Team	W	L	Pct.	GB
Texas Rangers	93	69	.574	—
Baltimore Orioles	93	69	.574	—
Tampa Bay Rays	90	72	.556	3
Los Angeles Angels of Anaheim	89	73	.549	4
Chicago White Sox	85	77	.525	8
Seattle Mariners	75	87	.463	18
Toronto Blue Jays	73	89	.451	20
Kansas City Royals	72	90	.444	21
Boston Red Sox	69	93	.426	24
Cleveland Indians	68	94	.420	25
Minnesota Twins	66	96	.407	27

==== Records vs opponents ====
	Record			Games Left		
Opponent	Home	Road	Total	Home	Road	Total
AL East
Baltimore Orioles	5–4	2–7	7–11	–	–	–
Boston Red Sox	4–5	7–2	11–7	–	–	–
New York Yankees	5–4	2–7	7–11	–	–	–
Tampa Bay Rays	3–6	1–8	4–14	–	–	–
Totals	17–19	12–24	29–43	–	–	–
AL Central
Chicago White Sox	1–3	3–3	4–6	–	–	–
Cleveland Indians	2–1	2–1	4–2	–	–	–
Detroit Tigers	2–1	0–3	2–4	–	–	–
Kansas City Royals	2–2	4–0	6–2	–	–	–
Minnesota Twins	3–0	2–2	5–2	–	–	–
Totals	10–7	11–9	21–16	–	–	–
AL West
Los Angeles Angels	2–2	2–2	4–4	–	–	–
Oakland Athletics	1–2	3–3	4–5	–	–	–
Seattle Mariners	3–3	0–3	3–6	–	–	–
Texas Rangers	3–3	0–3	3–6	–	–	–
Totals	9–10	5–11	14–21	–	–	–
National League
Atlanta Braves	–	1–2	1–2	–	–	–
Miami Marlins	–	2–1	2–1	–	–	–
Milwaukee Brewers	–	1–2	1–2	–	–	–
New York Mets	2–1	–	2–1	–	–	–
Philadelphia Phillies	3–0	–	3–0	–	–	–
Washington Nationals	0–3	–	0–3	–	–	–
Totals	5–4	4–5	9–9	–	–	–
Grand Totals	41–40	32–49	73–89	–	–	–

Month	Games	Won	Lost	Pct.
April	23	12	11	.522
May	28	15	13	.536
June	27	13	14	.481
July	25	11	14	.440
August	28	9	19	.321
September	28	10	18	.357
October	3	3	0	1.000
Totals	162	73	89	.451

2012 American League record Source: MLB Standings Grid – 2012
Team	BAL	BOS	CWS	CLE	DET	KC	LAA	MIN	NYY	OAK	SEA	TB	TEX	TOR	NL
Baltimore	–	13–5	6–2	4–4	3–3	5–4	2–7	5–2	9–9	4–5	8–1	10–8	2–5	11–7	11–7
Boston	5–13	–	6–2	5–3	5–5	4–3	0–6	4–3	5–13	1–8	5–4	9–9	2–6	7–11	11–7
Chicago	2–6	2–6	–	11–7	6–12	6–12	3–5	14–4	5–2	3–3	8–1	4–3	6–3	6–4	9–9
Cleveland	4–4	3–5	7–11	–	10–8	8–10	5–4	6–12	1–5	2–8	4–4	4–4	4–5	2–4	8–10
Detroit	3–3	5–5	12–6	8–10	–	13–5	5–5	10–8	4–6	4–3	1–5	5–2	3–7	4–2	11–7
Kansas City	4–5	3–4	12–6	10–8	5–13	–	4–5	7–11	3–4	5–4	1–7	4–2	4–5	2–6	8–10
Los Angeles	7–2	6–0	5–3	4–5	5–5	5–4	–	6–3	4–5	9–10	11–8	1–9	10–9	4–4	12–6
Minnesota	2–5	3–4	4–14	12–6	8–10	11–7	3–6	–	3–4	4–5	2–8	1–5	2–8	2–5	9–9
New York	9–9	13–5	2–5	5–1	6–4	4–3	5–4	4–3	–	5–5	6–3	8–10	4–3	11–7	13–5
Oakland	5–4	8–1	3–3	8–2	3–4	4–5	10–9	5–4	5–5	–	12–7	5–4	11–8	5–4	10–8
Seattle	1–8	4–5	1–8	4–4	5–1	7–1	8–11	8–2	3–6	7–12	–	4–6	9–10	6–3	8–10
Tampa Bay	8–10	9–9	3–4	4–4	2–5	2–4	9–1	5–1	10–8	4–5	6–4	–	5–4	14–4	9–9
Texas	5–2	6–2	3–6	5–4	7–3	5–4	9–10	8–2	3–4	8–11	10–9	4–5	–	6–3	14–4
Toronto	7–11	11–7	4–6	4–2	2–4	6–2	4–4	5–2	7–11	4–5	3–6	4–14	3–6	–	9–9

- Source: MLB Standings Grid – 2012

== 2012 draft picks ==
The 2012 Major League Baseball draft was held on June 4–6.

Round	Pick	Player	Position	College/School	Nationality	Signed
1	17	D. J. Davis	OF	Stone County High School (MS)	(United States)	2012–06–11
1	22*	Marcus Stroman	RHP	Duke	(United States)	2012–07–03
C-A	50*	Matt Smoral	LHP	Solon High School (OH)	(United States)	2012–06–18
C-A	58*	Mitch Nay	3B	Hamilton High School (AZ)	(United States)	2012–06–11
C-A	60*	Tyler Gonzales	RHP	James Madison High School (TX)	(United States)	2012–06–11
2	81	Chase De Jong	RHP	Woodrow Wilson High School (CA)	(United States)	2012–07–01
3	112	Anthony Alford	OF	Petal High School (MS)	(United States)	2012–06–11
4	145	Tucker Donahue	RHP	Stetson	(United States)	2012–06–11
5	175	Brad Delatte	LHP	Nicholls State	(United States)	2012–06–11
6	205	Eric Phillips	3B	Georgia Southern	(United States)	2012–06–11
7	235	Ian Parmley	OF	Liberty	(United States)	2012–06–11
8	265	Harrison Frawley	C	Coastal Carolina	(United States)	2012–06–11
9	295	Jordan Leyland	1B	Azusa Pacific	(United States)	2012–06–11
10	325	Alex Azor	OF	Navy	(United States)	2012–06–11

- * The Blue Jays received the 22nd pick as compensation for unsigned 2011 draft pick Tyler Beede
- * The Blue Jays received the 50th pick as compensation for loss of free agent Frank Francisco
- * The Blue Jays received the 58th pick as compensation for loss of free agent Jon Rauch
- * The Blue Jays received the 60th pick as compensation for loss of free agent Jose Molina

=== Roster ===
2012 Toronto Blue Jays
Roster
Pitchers: 37 Henderson Álvarez; 58 Chad Beck; 39 Andrew Carpenter; 39 David Carpenter; 34 Joel Carreño; 27 Brett Cecil; 20 Jesse Chavez; 56 Robert Coello; 48 Francisco Cordero; 46 Evan Crawford; 50 Steve Delabar; 4 Kyle Drabek; 35 Sam Dyson; 54 Jason Frasor; 48 J. A. Happ; 45 Shawn Hill; 36 Drew Hutchison; 56 Ryota Igarashi; 44 Casey Janssen; 64 Chad Jenkins; 20 Bobby Korecky; 32 Aaron Laffey; 49 Brad Lincoln; 62 Aaron Loup; 31 Brandon Lyon; 23 Brandon Morrow; 38 Darren Oliver; 49 David Pauley; 47 Luis Pérez; 57 Scott Richmond; 24 Ricky Romero; 21 Sergio Santos; 33 Carlos Villanueva	Catchers: 9 J. P. Arencibia; 68 Yan Gomes; 6 Jeff Mathis; 8 Yorvit Torrealba; Infielders: 30 David Cooper; 10 Edwin Encarnación; 5 Yunel Escobar; 3 Adeiny Hechavarria; 2 Kelly Johnson; 13 Brett Lawrie; 26 Adam Lind; 18 Mike McCoy; 17 Omar Vizquel	Outfielders: 19 José Bautista; 11 Rajai Davis; 8 Ben Francisco; 43 Anthony Gose; 28 Colby Rasmus; 14 Moisés Sierra; 45 Travis Snider; 14 Eric Thames	Manager: 52 John Farrell; Coaches: 61 Alex Andreopoulos (bullpen catcher); 55 Brian Butterfield (third base); 7 Torey Lovullo (first base); 41 Dwayne Murphy (hitting); 63 Luis Rivera (coach); 22 Don Wakamatsu (bench); 40 Pete Walker (bullpen); 53 Bruce Walton (pitching)

== Player stats ==
=== Batting ===
Note: G = Games played; AB = At bats; R = Runs; H = Hits; 2B = Doubles; 3B = Triples; HR = Home runs; RBI = Runs batted in; SB = Stolen bases; BB = Walks; AVG = Batting average; SLG = Slugging average

Player	G	AB	R	H	2B	3B	HR	RBI	SB	BB	AVG	SLG
Colby Rasmus	151	565	75	126	21	5	23	75	4	47	.223	.400
Yunel Escobar	145	558	58	141	22	1	9	51	5	35	.253	.344
Edwin Encarnación	151	542	93	152	24	0	42	110	13	84	.280	.557
Kelly Johnson	142	507	61	114	19	2	16	55	14	62	.225	.365
Brett Lawrie	125	494	73	135	26	3	11	48	13	33	.273	.405
Rajai Davis	142	447	64	115	24	3	8	43	46	29	.257	.378
J. P. Arencibia	102	347	45	81	16	0	18	56	1	18	.233	.435
José Bautista	92	332	64	80	14	0	27	65	5	59	.241	.527
Adam Lind	93	321	28	82	14	2	11	45	0	29	.255	.414
Jeff Mathis	70	211	25	46	13	0	8	27	1	9	.218	.393
Anthony Gose	56	166	25	37	7	3	1	11	15	17	.223	.319
Omar Vizquel	60	153	13	36	5	1	0	7	3	7	.235	.281
Eric Thames	46	148	17	36	7	1	3	11	0	9	.243	.365
Moisés Sierra	49	147	14	33	4	0	6	15	1	8	.224	.374
David Cooper	45	140	16	42	11	0	4	11	0	4	.300	.464
Adeiny Hechavarria	41	126	10	32	8	0	2	15	0	4	.254	.365
Yan Gomes	43	98	9	20	4	0	4	13	0	6	.204	.367
Mike McCoy	32	52	10	9	1	0	1	7	2	4	.173	.250
Ben Francisco	27	50	5	12	5	1	0	2	0	4	.240	.380
Travis Snider	10	36	6	9	2	0	3	8	0	3	.250	.556
Yorvit Torrealba	10	28	3	6	0	0	1	2	0	2	.214	.321
Pitcher totals	162	19	2	2	0	0	0	0	0	0	.105	.105
Team Totals	162	5487	716	1346	247	22	198	677	123	473	.245	.407

=== Pitching ===
Note: W = Wins; L = Losses; ERA = Earned run average; G = Games pitched; GS = Games started; SV = Saves; IP = Innings pitched; H = Hits allowed; R = Runs allowed; ER = Earned runs allowed; BB = Walks allowed; SO = Strikeouts

Player	W	L	ERA	G	GS	SV	IP	H	R	ER	BB	SO
Henderson Álvarez	9	14	4.85	31	31	0	187.1	216	110	101	54	79
Ricky Romero	9	14	5.77	32	32	0	181.0	198	122	116	105	124
Carlos Villanueva	7	7	4.16	38	16	0	125.1	113	59	58	46	122
Brandon Morrow	10	7	2.96	21	21	0	124.2	98	45	41	41	108
Aaron Laffey	4	6	4.56	22	16	0	100.2	100	56	51	37	48
Kyle Drabek	4	7	4.67	13	13	0	71.1	67	41	37	47	47
Casey Janssen	1	1	2.54	62	0	22	63.2	44	18	18	11	67
Brett Cecil	2	4	5.72	21	9	0	61.1	70	40	39	23	51
Drew Hutchison	5	3	4.60	11	11	0	58.2	59	31	30	20	49
Darren Oliver	3	4	2.06	62	0	2	56.2	43	13	13	15	52
Jason Frasor	1	1	4.12	50	0	0	43.2	42	20	20	22	53
Luis Pérez	2	2	3.43	35	0	0	42.0	38	16	16	16	39
J.A. Happ	3	2	4.69	10	6	0	40.1	35	21	21	17	46
Francisco Cordero	3	5	5.77	41	0	2	34.1	48	24	22	14	26
Chad Jenkins	1	3	4.50	13	3	0	32.0	32	16	16	11	16
Aaron Loup	0	2	2.64	33	0	0	30.2	26	10	9	2	21
Steve Delabar	2	2	3.38	27	0	0	29.1	23	12	11	15	46
Brad Lincoln	1	0	5.65	24	0	0	28.2	29	18	18	10	28
Brandon Lyon	4	0	2.88	30	0	1	25.0	19	8	8	9	28
Joel Carreño	0	2	6.14	11	2	0	22.0	22	15	15	14	16
Jesse Chavez	1	1	8.44	9	2	0	21.1	25	22	20	10	27
Chad Beck	0	0	6.32	14	0	0	15.2	21	12	11	5	9
Andrew Carpenter	0	0	5.00	6	0	0	9.0	7	5	5	6	9
Evan Crawford	0	0	6.75	10	0	0	8.0	10	6	6	4	5
Robert Coello	0	1	12.79	6	0	0	6.1	10	9	9	4	11
David Pauley	0	0	9.95	5	0	0	6.1	11	7	7	2	2
Sergio Santos	0	1	9.00	6	0	2	5.0	6	5	5	4	4
Scott Richmond	0	0	6.00	3	0	0	3.0	5	2	2	0	2
Shawn Hill	1	0	0.00	1	0	0	3.0	0	0	0	2	0
David Carpenter	0	0	30.38	3	0	0	2.2	8	10	9	2	4
Jeff Mathis	0	0	9.00	2	0	0	2.0	4	2	2	1	0
Ryota Igarashi	0	0	36.00	2	0	0	1.0	5	4	4	2	2
Bobby Korecky	0	0	18.00	1	0	0	1.0	1	2	2	1	0
Sam Dyson	0	0	40.50	2	0	0	0.2	4	3	3	2	1
Team totals	73	89	4.64	162	162	29	1443.2	1439	784	745	514	1142

=== Top prospects ===
#	Player	Position	Top 100 Rank	MLB Rank	2012 Starting Team (Level)
1	Travis d'Arnaud	Catcher	17	25	AAA
2	Anthony Gose*	Outfielder	39	56	AAA
3	Jake Marisnick	Outfielder	67	57	High A
4	Daniel Norris	Left-handed pitcher	91	-	TBD
5	Justin Nicolino	Left-handed pitcher	-	-	A
6	Aaron Sanchez	Right-handed pitcher	-	-	A
7	Noah Syndergaard	Right-handed pitcher	-	94	A
8	Deck McGuire	Right-handed pitcher	-	-	AA
9	Drew Hutchison*	Right-handed pitcher	-	-	AA
10	Asher Wojciechowski	Right-handed pitcher	-	-	High A

* According to Baseball America Top 100 Prospects

* According to 2012 Prospect Watch

* Top 10 Blue Jays prospects via Baseball America

== Game log ==
Legend
Blue Jays Win	Blue Jays Loss	Game postponed

2012 Game Log
April 12–11 (Home 6–7, Road 6–4)

#	Date	Opponent	Score	Win	Loss	Save	Attendance	Record	GB
1	April 5	@ Indians	7–4 (16)	Pérez (1–0)	Asencio (0–1)	–	43,190	1–0	+½
2	April 7	@ Indians	7–4 (12)	Janssen (1–0)	Sipp (0–1)	–	18,842	2–0	–
3	April 8	@ Indians	3–4	Lowe (1–0)	Carreño (0–1)	Perez (1)	10,518	2–1	1
4	April 9	Red Sox	2–4	Atchison (1–0)	Santos (0–1)	Aceves (1)	48,473	2–2	1½
5	April 10	Red Sox	7–3	Drabek (1–0)	Bard (0–1)	–	26,357	3–2	½
6	April 11	Red Sox	3–1	Romero (1–0)	Lester (0–1)	Santos (1)	25,285	4–2	½
7	April 13	Orioles	5–7	O'Day (1–0)	Oliver (0–1)	Johnson (3)	21,988	4–3	–
8	April 14	Orioles	4–6	Ayala (1–0)	Cordero (0–1)	Johnson (4)	28,355	4–4	1
9	April 15	Orioles	9–2	Drabek (2–0)	Matusz (0–2)	–	20,252	5–4	–
10	April 17	Rays	7–3	Romero (2–0)	Niemann (0–2)	–	15,331	6–4	½
11	April 18	Rays	2–12	Price (2–1)	Morrow (0–1)	–	15,828	6–5	½
12	April 19	Rays	4–9	Hellickson (2–0)	Álvarez (0–1)	–	18,976	6–6	1½
13	April 20	@ Royals	4–3	Pérez (2–0)	Holland (0–2)	Santos (2)	23,065	7–6	½
14	April 21	@ Royals	9–5	Hutchison (1–0)	Teaford (0–1)	–	27,804	8–6	½
15	April 22	@ Royals	5–3	Romero (3–0)	Duffy (1–2)	Cordero (1)	26,891	9–6	–
16	April 23	@ Royals	4–1	Morrow (1–1)	Chen (0–2)	Cordero (2)	13,267	10–6	–
17	April 24	@ Orioles	1–2	Hunter (2–1)	Álvarez (0–2)	Strop (1)	11,058	10–7	–
18	April 25	@ Orioles	0–3	Hammel (3–0)	Drabek (2–1)	Strop (2)	10,415	10–8	1
19	April 26	@ Orioles	2–5	O'Day (2–0)	Janssen (1–1)	Ayala (1)	13,725	10–9	2
20	April 27	Mariners	5–9 (10)	Furbush (2–1)	Pérez (2–1)		24,303	10–10	3
21	April 28	Mariners	7–0	Morrow (2–1)	Millwood (0–2)		30,765	11–10	2
22	April 29	Mariners	7–2	Álvarez (1–2)	Vargas (3–2)		22,320	12–10	2
23	April 30	Rangers	1–4	Darvish (4–0)	Drabek (2–2)	Nathan (6)	21,945	12–11	3

May 15–13 (Home 9–3, Road 6–10)

#	Date	Opponent	Score	Win	Loss	Save	Attendance	Record	GB
24	May 1	Rangers	8–7	Cordero (1–1)	Adams (0–1)		18,774	13–11	3
25	May 2	Rangers	11–5	Romero (4–0)	Harrison (3–2)		25,123	14–11	3
26	May 3	@ Angels	5–0	Morrow (3–1)	Haren (1–2)		28,359	15–11	3
27	May 4	@ Angels	4–0	Álvarez (2–2)	Santana (0–6)		33,160	16–11	3
28	May 5	@ Angels	2–6	Wilson (4–2)	Drabek (2–3)		39,018	16–12	3
29	May 6	@ Angels	3–4	Williams (3–1)	Hutchison (1–1)	Hawkins (1)	37,548	16–13	3½
30	May 8	@ Athletics	3–7	Balfour (1–1)	Cordero (1–2)		10,784	16–14	3
31	May 9	@ Athletics	5–2	Morrow (4–1)	Ross (1–3)	Janssen (1)	14,815	17–14	3
32	May 10	@ Twins	6–2	Álvarez (3–2)	Marquis (2-2)		31,438	18–14	2
33	May 11	@ Twins	6–7	Blackburn (1–4)	Drabek (2–4)	Capps (6)	33,387	18–15	3
34	May 12	@ Twins	2–1	Hutchison (2–1)	Walters (0–1)	Janssen (2)	38,820	19–15	3
35	May 13	@ Twins	3–4	Diamond (2–0)	Romero (4–1)	Capps (7)	36,889	19–16	3
36	May 14	Rays	1–7	Ramos (1–0)	Morrow (4–2)		15,289	19–17	3
37	May 15	Rays	3–4	Price (6–2)	Álvarez (3–3)	Rodney (11)	15,612	19–18	4
38	May 16	Yankees	8–1	Drabek (3–4)	Kuroda (3–5)		28,915	20–18	4
39	May 17	Yankees	4–1	Hutchison (3–1)	Hughes (3–5)	Janssen (3)	31,266	21–18	4
40	May 18	Mets	14–5	Romero (5–1)	Niese (2–2)		26,712	22–18	4
41	May 19	Mets	2–0	Morrow (5–2)	Hefner (0–1)		34,962	23–18	4
42	May 20	Mets	5–6	Gee (3–3)	Álvarez (3–4)	Francisco (10)	41,867	23–19	4
43	May 21	@ Rays	6–2	Drabek (4–4)	Hellickson (4–1)		10,844	24–19	3
44	May 22	@ Rays	5–8	Davis (1–0)	Hutchison (3–2)	Rodney (14)	12,307	24–20	4
45	May 23	@ Rays	4–5 (11)	McGee (1–1)	Oliver (0–2)		11,471	24–21	4
46	May 25	@ Rangers	3–14	Holland (4–3)	Morrow (5–3)		46,789	24–22	5
47	May 26	@ Rangers	7–8 (13)	Tateyama (1–0)	Frasor (0–1)		47,430	24–23	5
48	May 27	@ Rangers	6–12	Darvish (7–2)	Drabek (4–5)		46,637	24–24	5
49	May 28	Orioles	6–2	Hutchison (4–2)	Hunter (2–3)	Janssen (4)	16,575	25–24	4
50	May 29	Orioles	8–6	Romero (6–1)	Arrieta (2–6)		17,352	26–24	3
51	May 30	Orioles	4–1	Morrow (6–3)	Hammel (6–2)	Janssen (5)	17,754	27–24	2

June 13–14 (Home 6–6, Road 7–8)

#	Date	Opponent	Score	Win	Loss.	Save	Attendance	Record	GB
52	June 1	Red Sox	2–7	Buchholz (5–2)	Álvarez (3–5)		29,678	27–25	3
53	June 2	Red Sox	4–7	Doubront (6–2)	Drabek (4–6)	Aceves (14)	43,390	27–26	3
54	June 3	Red Sox	5–1	Hutchison (5–2)	Bard (5–6)		41,925	28–26	3
55	June 5	@ White Sox	9–5	Romero (7–1)	Humber (2–3)		23,107	29–26	2
56	June 6	@ White Sox	4–0	Morrow (7–3)	Quintana (1–1)		25,672	30–26	2
57	June 7	@ White Sox	3–4	Reed (1–1)	Cordero (1–3)		25,743	30–27	2
58	June 8	@ Braves	3–4 (10)	Martínez (3–1)	Cordero (1–4)		42,488	30–28	3
59	June 9	@ Braves	2–5	Hanson (7–4)	Hutchison (5–3)	Kimbrel (18)	32,819	30–29	4
60	June 10	@ Braves	12–4	Villanueva (1–0)	Hernández (1–1)		20,222	31–29	4
61	June 11	Nationals	3–6	Jackson (3–3)	Morrow (7–4)		18,513	31–30	4½
62	June 12	Nationals	2–4	Wang (2–2)	Álvarez (3–6)	Clippard (9)	22,538	31–31	5½
63	June 13	Nationals	2–6	Strasburg (8–1)	Drabek (4–7)		41,667	31–32	6½
64	June 15	Phillies	3–0	Villanueva (2–0)	Worley (3–3)	Janssen (6)	28,266	32–32	6½
65	June 16	Phillies	6–5 (10)	Cordero (2–4)	Savery (0–2)		42,070	33–32	6½
66	June 17	Phillies	6–2	Cecil (1–0)	Kendrick (2–7)		45,060	34–32	6½
67	June 18	@ Brewers	6–7	Loe (4–2)	Coello (0–1)	Axford (12)	32,223	34–33	7½
68	June 19	@ Brewers	10–9	Oliver (1–2)	Axford (1–4)	Janssen (7)	36,334	35–33	6½
69	June 20	@ Brewers	3–8	Gallardo (6–5)	Carreño (0–2)		33,077	35–34	6½
70	June 22	@ Marlins	12–5	Romero (8–1)	Sánchez (3–6)		22,387	36–34	5½
71	June 23	@ Marlins	7–1	Oliver (2–2)	Cishek (4–1)		24,448	37–34	5½
72	June 24	@ Marlins	0–9	Buehrle (6–8)	Chavez (0–1)		27,888	37–35	6½
73	June 25	@ Red Sox	9–6	Álvarez (4–6)	Doubront (8–4)	Janssen (8)	37,208	38–35	6½
74	June 26	@ Red Sox	1–5	Miller (2–0)	Pérez (2–2)		37,755	38–36	7½
75	June 27	@ Red Sox	4–10	Lester (5–5)	Romero (8–2)		37,744	38–37	8½
76	June 28	Angels	7–9	Haren (6–7)	Cecil (1–1)	Frieri (10)	24,668	38–38	8½
77	June 29	Angels	7–5	Cordero (3–4)	Walden (2–2)	Janssen (9)	24,538	39–38	7½
78	June 30	Angels	11–2	Álvarez (5–6)	Richards (2–1)		29,287	40–38	7½

July 11–14 (Home 7–6, Road 4–8)

#	Date	Opponent	Score	Win	Loss	Save	Attendance	Record	GB
79	July 1	Angels	6–10	Isringhausen (3–0)	Cordero (3–5)		34,853	40–39	8½
80	July 2	Royals	3–11	Teaford (1–1)	Romero (8–3)		17,127	40–40	8½
81	July 3	Royals	6–3	Cecil (2–1)	Mazzaro (3–3)	Janssen (10)	15,516	41–40	7½
82	July 4	Royals	4–1	Villanueva (3–0)	Mendoza (3–5)	Janssen (11)	17,831	42–40	7½
83	July 5	Royals	6–9	Hochevar (6–8)	Álvarez (5–7)	Broxton (21)	20,598	42–41	8
84	July 6	@ White Sox	2–4	Peavy (7–5)	Laffey (0–1)	Reed (13)	27,129	42–42	9
85	July 7	@ White Sox	0–2	Floyd (7–8)	Romero (8–4)	Thornton (2)	25,399	42–43	9½
86	July 8	@ White Sox	11–9	Frasor (1–1)	Axelrod (0–2)	Janssen (12)	27,190	43–43	9½
87	July 13	Indians	0–1	Masterson (6–8)	Romero (8–5)	Perez (25)	32,308	43–44	10½
88	July 14	Indians	11–9	Laffey (1–1)	Jiménez (8–8)	Janssen (13)	32,517	44–44	10½
89	July 15	Indians	3–0	Villanueva (4–0)	Lowe (8–7)	Oliver (1)	26,407	45–44	9½
90	July 16	@ Yankees	3–6	Robertson (1–3)	Loup (0–1)	Soriano (23)	42,819	45–45	10½
91	July 17	@ Yankees	1–6	Sabathia (10–3)	Cecil (2–2)	Soriano (24)	44,975	45–46	11½
92	July 18	@ Yankees	0–6 (7)	Kuroda (9–7)	Romero (8–6)		45,986	45–47	12½
93	July 20	@ Red Sox	6–1	Laffey (2–1)	Beckett (5–8)		38,093	46–47	11
94	July 21	@ Red Sox	7–3	Villanueva (5–0)	Cook (2–3)		38,170	47–47	10
95	July 22	@ Red Sox	15–7	Álvarez (6–7)	Lester (5–8)		37,737	48–47	9
96	July 24	Athletics	2–7	Blackley (3–2)	Cecil (2–3)		25,686	48–48	9½
97	July 25	Athletics	0–16	Griffin (3–0)	Romero (8–7)		23,948	48–49	10½
98	July 26	Athletics	10–4	Lyon (1–2)	Milone (9–7)		39,003	49–49	10
99	July 27	Tigers	8–3	Villanueva (6–0)	Porcello (7–6)		33,962	50–49	10
100	July 28	Tigers	5–1	Álvarez (7–7)	Sánchez (5–8)		41,832	51–49	9
101	July 29	Tigers	1–4	Fister (5–7)	Cecil (2–4)	Valverde (20)	35,975	51–50	9
102	July 30	@ Mariners	1–4	Iwakuma (2–2)	Romero (8–8)	Luetge (1)	22,443	51–51	9
103	July 31	@ Mariners	2–7	Vargas (12–7)	Laffey (2–2)		21,434	51–52	9

August 9–19 (Home 5–7, Road 4–12)

#	Date	Opponent	Score	Win	Loss	Save	Attendance	Record	GB
104	August 1	@ Mariners	3–5	Beavan (7–6)	Villanueva (6–1)	Wilhelmsen (15)	22,537	51–53	10
105	August 2	@ Athletics	1–4	Colón (8–8)	Álvarez (7–8)	Cook (11)	10,823	51–54	10½
106	August 3	@ Athletics	4–5 (15)	Blackley (4–3)	Loup (0–2)		30,169	51–55	11½
107	August 4	@ Athletics	3–1 (11)	Chavez (1–1)	Blevins (4–1)	Oliver (2)	17,121	52–55	10½
108	August 5	@ Athletics	6–5	Laffey (3–2)	Milone (9–9)	Janssen (14)	18,308	53–55	10½
109	August 7	@ Rays	1–4	Shields (10–7)	Happ (7–10)	Rodney (33)	13,823	53–56	10
110	August 8	@ Rays	2–3	Cobb (6–8)	Villanueva (6–2)	Rodney (34)	13,441	53–57	11
111	August 9	@ Rays	1–7	Moore (9–7)	Álvarez (7–9)		23,462	53–58	12
112	August 10	Yankees	4–10	García (6–5)	Romero (8–9)		41,610	53–59	13
113	August 11	Yankees	2–5	Nova (11–6)	Laffey (3–3)	Soriano (28)	45,582	53–60	14
114	August 12	Yankees	10–7	Happ (8–10)	Hughes (11–10)	Janssen (15)	43,924	54–60	13
115	August 13	White Sox	3–2 (11)	Delabar (3–1)	Séptimo (0–2)		16,828	55–60	13
116	August 14	White Sox	2–3	Quintana (5–2)	Álvarez (7–10)	Reed (21)	18,919	55–61	14
117	August 15	White Sox	5–9	Floyd (9–9)	Romero (8–10)		20,119	55–62	15
118	August 16	White Sox	2–7	Liriano (4–10)	Laffey (3–4)		19,855	55–63	15
119	August 17	Rangers	3–2	Happ (9–10)	Darvish (12–9)	Janssen (16)	26,816	56–63	15
120	August 18	Rangers	1–2	Kirkman (1–2)	Villanueva (6–3)	Nathan (24)	30,033	56–64	15
121	August 19	Rangers	2–11	Harrison (14–7)	Álvarez (7–11)		35,701	56–65	16
122	August 21	@ Tigers	3–5	Scherzer (13–6)	Romero (8–11)	Valverde (24)	39,499	56–66	15½
123	August 22	@ Tigers	2–3	Sánchez (7–10)	Laffey (3–5)	Valverde (25)	37,225	56–67	15½
124	August 23	@ Tigers	2–3 (11)	Benoit (3–3)	Jenkins (0–1)		39,910	56–68	16
125	August 24	@ Orioles	4–6	Britton (3–1)	Villanueva (6–4)	Johnson (39)	25,754	56–69	17
126	August 25	@ Orioles	2–8	Johnson (2–0)	Morrow (7–5)		25,082	56–70	17
–	August 26	@ Orioles	Postponed (rain) Rescheduled for September 24						17½
127	August 27	@ Yankees	8–7 (11)	Oliver (3–2)	Lowe (8–11)		42,962	57–70	16½
128	August 28	@ Yankees	1–2	Hughes (13–11)	Romero (8–12)	Soriano (34)	42,472	57–71	17½
129	August 29	@ Yankees	8–5	Happ (10–10)	Sabathia (13–4)	Janssen (17)	46,010	58–71	16½
130	August 30	Rays	2–0	Villanueva (7–4)	Moore (10–8)	Janssen (18)	22,711	59–71	16
131	August 31	Rays	2–1	Morrow (8–5)	Hellickson (8–10)	Janssen (19)	20,158	60–71	15

September 10–18 (Home 5–10, Road 5–8)

#	Date	Opponent	Score	Win	Loss	Save	Attendance	Record	GB
132	September 1	Rays	4–5	Davis (2–0)	Álvarez (7–12)	Rodney (40)	20,478	60–72	16
133	September 2	Rays	4–9	Price (17–5)	Romero (8–13)		18,568	60–73	16
134	September 3	Orioles	0–4	Saunders (7–11)	Happ (10–11)		17,220	60–74	16
135	September 4	Orioles	0–12	Britton (5–1)	Villanueva (7–5)		13,556	60–75	16
136	September 5	Orioles	6–4	Delabar (4–1)	González (6–4)		14,458	61–75	16
137	September 7	@ Red Sox	7–5	Álvarez (8–12)	Doubront (10–8)		37,156	62–75	15½
138	September 8	@ Red Sox	9–2	Lincoln (5–2)	Matsuzaka (1–5)		37,107	63–75	14½
139	September 9	@ Red Sox	4–3	Lyon (2–2)	Buchholz (11–6)	Janssen (20)	37,226	64–75	14½
140	September 11	Mariners	3–4	Ramírez (1–2)	Morrow (8–6)	Wilhelmsen (25)	12,935	64–76	14½
141	September 12	Mariners	2–3	Millwood (6–12)	Romero (8–14)	Wilhelmsen (26)	13,519	64–77	15½
142	September 13	Mariners	8–3	Álvarez (9–12)	Hernández (13–8)		13,756	65–77	15½
143	September 14	Red Sox	5–8	Carpenter (1–0)	Oliver (3–3)	Bailey (3)	21,888	65–78	15½
144	September 15	Red Sox	2–3	Breslow (3–0)	Delabar (4–2)	Bailey (4)	27,325	65–79	16½
145	September 16	Red Sox	5–0	Lyon (3–2)	Lester (9–12)		21,698	66–79	16½
–	September 18	@ Yankees	Postponed (rain) Rescheduled for September 19						
146	September 19	@ Yankees	2–4	Pettitte (4–3)	Álvarez (9–13)	Soriano (41)	39,859	66–80	17½
147	September 19	@ Yankees	1–2	Eppley (1–2)	Delabar (4–3)	Soriano (42)	39,997	66–81	18½
148	September 20	@ Yankees	7–10	Hughes (16–12)	Laffey (3–6)	Robertson (2)	40,511	66–82	19½
149	September 21	@ Rays	1–12	Shields (15–9)	Villanueva (7–6)		14,187	66–83	20½
150	September 22	@ Rays	5–11	Badenhop (3–2)	Morrow (8–7)		15,699	66–84	21½
151	September 23	@ Rays	0–3	Hellickson (9–10)	Jenkins (0–2)	Rodney (44)	18,985	66–85	21½
153	September 24	@ Orioles	1–4	Johnson (4–0)	Álvarez (9–14)	Johnson (48)		66–86	22½
154	September 24	@ Orioles	9–5	Romero (9–14)	Chen (12–10)		31,015	67–86	22
154	September 25	@ Orioles	4–0	Laffey (4–6)	Saunders (8–13)		30,205	68–86	21
155	September 26	@ Orioles	2–12	González (8–4)	Villanueva (7–7)		26,513	68–87	22
156	September 27	Yankees	6–0	Morrow (9–7)	Nova (12–8)		23,060	69–87	21
157	September 28	Yankees	4–11	Kuroda (15–11)	Jenkins (0–3)		25,785	69–88	22
158	September 29	Yankees	3–2	Hill (1–0)	Pettitte (5–4)	Janssen (21)	36,139	70–88	21
159	September 30	Yankees	6–9	Logan (7–2)	Oliver (3–4)		31,418	70–89	22

October 3–0 (Home 3–0, Road 0–0)

#	Date	Opponent	Score	Win	Loss	Save	Attendance	Record	GB
160	October 1	Twins	6–5 (10)	Lyon (4–2)	Duensing (4–12)		12,359	71–89	22
161	October 2	Twins	4–3	Jenkins (1–3)	Swarzak (3–6)	Janssen (22)	13,930	72–89	22
162	October 3	Twins	2–1	Morrow (10–7)	Diamond (12–9)	Lyon (1)	19,769	73–89	22

== Honours and awards ==
All-Star Game

- José Bautista, 3rd selection

Home Run Derby

- José Bautista, 2nd selection – 2nd-place finish

Player of the Week

- J. P. Arencibia – May 14–20

Player of the Month

- José Bautista – June

== Farm system ==
Level	Team	League	Manager
AAA	Las Vegas 51s	Pacific Coast League	Marty Brown
AA	New Hampshire Fisher Cats	Eastern League	Sal Fasano
A	Dunedin Blue Jays	Florida State League	Mike Redmond
A	Lansing Lugnuts	Midwest League	John Tamargo, Jr.
A-Short Season	Vancouver Canadians	Northwest League	Clayton McCullough
Rookie	Bluefield Blue Jays	Appalachian League	Dennis Holmberg
Rookie	GCL Blue Jays	Gulf Coast League	Omar Malavé and John Schneider

LEAGUE CHAMPIONS: Vancouver
