= Lansing Lugnuts =

American Minor League baseball team in Michigan

- Founded in 1955 in Lafayette, Indiana; Based in Lansing, Michigan since 1996
Team logo
Cap insignia

Minor league affiliations
- Class: High-A (2021–present)
- Previous classes: Class A (1955–2020)
- League: Midwest League (1955–present)
- Division: East Division

Major league affiliations
- Team: Oakland Athletics / Athletics (2021–present)
- Previous teams: Toronto Blue Jays (2005–2020); Chicago Cubs (1999–2004); Kansas City Royals (1995–1998, 1969–1976); San Diego Padres (1990–1994); Co-op (1989); Cleveland Indians (1977–1988, 1955); Boston Red Sox (1956–1968)

Minor league titles
- League titles (9): 1958; 1959; 1960; 1975; 1976; 1980; 1986; 1997; 2003
- First-half titles (4): 1999; 2008; 2012; 2015
- Second-half titles (1): 1996

Team data
- Name: Lansing Lugnuts (1996–present)
- Previous names: Springfield Sultans (1994–1995); Waterloo Diamonds (1989–1993); Waterloo Indians (1977–1988); Waterloo Royals (1970–1976); Waterloo Hawks (1958–1969); Lafayette Red Sox (1956–1957); Lafayette Chiefs (1955)
- Colors: Red and silver
- Mascot: Big Lug
- Ballpark: Jackson Field (1996–present)
- Previous parks: Lanphier Park (1994–1995); Riverfront Stadium (1958–1993); Loeb Stadium (1955–1957)
- Owner/ Operator: Diamond Baseball Holdings
- General manager: Zac Clark
- Manager: Javier Godard
- Website: milb.com/lansing

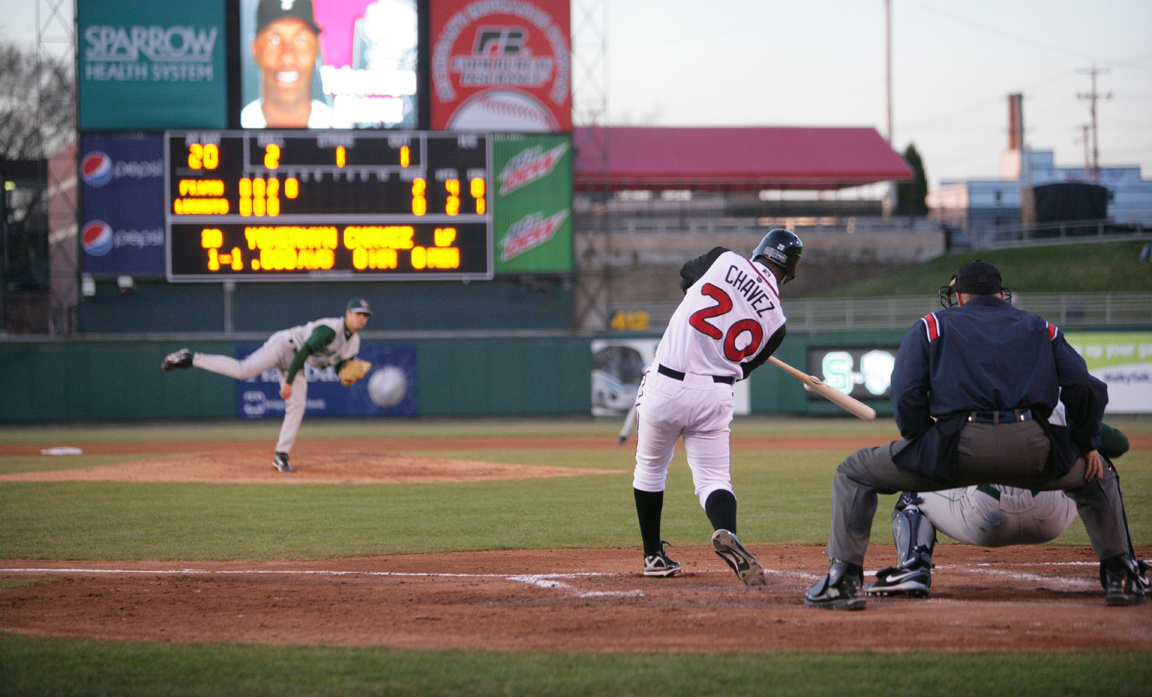
The Lansing Lugnuts at Oldsmobile Park in 2009

The Lansing Lugnuts are a Minor League Baseball team of the Midwest League and the High-A affiliate of the Athletics. They are located in Lansing, Michigan, and play their home games at Jackson Field.

The Midwest League came to Lansing after owners Tom Dickson and Sherrie Myers moved the team to work with the city for a public-private lease to build a new stadium. Mayor David Hollister, and the City Council worked to attract the owners and build the stadium for downtown economic development. The team began playing in downtown Lansing in 1996. The franchise began as the Lafayette Red Sox in Lafayette, Indiana, in 1955; after two seasons it became the Waterloo Hawks, moving to Waterloo, Iowa, where it stayed for 36 seasons. Before the 1994 season it moved to Springfield, Illinois, but only spent two seasons there before moving to Lansing. The franchise was an affiliate of the Kansas City Royals on two occasions in three cities: as the Waterloo Royals from 1969 through 1976, as the Sultans of Springfield in 1995, and then, upon the team's move to Lansing, from 1996 through 1998. The Lugnuts were then an affiliate of the Chicago Cubs from 1999 through 2004 before joining the Jays' farm system for the 2005 season. In September 2014, the Jays extended their agreement with the Lugnuts through the 2016 season. In October 2016, their player development contract was extended through the 2018 season. Since 2021, they have been the High-A affiliate of the Oakland Athletics.

The Lugnuts' ballpark, Jackson Field, opened in 1996. The stadium seats over 10,000 fans and is one of the most handicapped accessible stadiums in the country. The franchise attendance record of 538,326 was set during its inaugural year. They won the Midwest League Championship in 1997 and 2003. The Lugnuts have their own original song which plays immediately after the national anthem for every home game accompanied by their mascot, Big Lug.

In conjunction with Major League Baseball's restructuring of Minor League Baseball in 2021, the Lugnuts were organized into the High-A Central. In 2022, the High-A Central became known as the Midwest League, the name historically used by the regional circuit prior to the 2021 reorganization.

== Crosstown Showdown ==
Since 2007, the Lansing Lugnuts have participated in an annual exhibition game with nearby Michigan State University which draws a large crowd of students to the event. In 2026 the Lugnuts announced a new format with the entire game being machine pitched, with the goal of eliminating pitching injuries. It is not currently clear if the change will remain in future years. The overall record and attendance for each game is as follows:

Date	Winning team	Score	Losing team	Attendance	Ref
April 3, 2007	Lansing Lugnuts	4–3	Michigan State	6,223	
April 24, 2008	Lansing Lugnuts	4–2	Michigan State	12,862	
April 16, 2009	Michigan State	12–2	Lansing Lugnuts	12,992	
April 26, 2010	Lansing Lugnuts	5–4	Michigan State	6,778	
April 5, 2011	Michigan State	2-1	Lansing Lugnuts	7,212	
April 5, 2012	Lansing Lugnuts	7–0	Michigan State	12,997	
May 1, 2013	Lansing Lugnuts	10–2	Michigan State	11,619	
April 3, 2014	Lansing Lugnuts	3–2	Michigan State	4,455	
April 9, 2015	Lansing Lugnuts	9–4	Michigan State	9,318	
September 6, 2016	Lansing Lugnuts	4–1	Michigan State	8,432	
September 5, 2017	Lansing Lugnuts	5–1	Michigan State	6,804	
September 4, 2018	Lansing Lugnuts	6–4	Michigan State	6,338	
September 3, 2019	Lansing Lugnuts	5–1	Michigan State	5,933	
April 6, 2022	Lansing Lugnuts	3–2	Michigan State	3,117	
April 4, 2023	Lansing Lugnuts	12-3	Michigan State	4,412	
April 3, 2024	Lansing Lugnuts	16-0	Michigan State	4,118	
April 1, 2025	Michigan State	1-0	Lansing Lugnuts	3,733	
April 1, 2026	Michigan State	16-10	Lansing Lugnuts	2,125	

== Playoffs ==
Season	Quarterfinals	Semifinals	Finals
1996	-	-	-
1997	W, 2–1, Michigan	W, 2–0, Fort Wayne	W, 3–2, Kane County
1998	-	-	-
1999	W, 2–0, Michigan	L, 2–0, Wisconsin	-
2000	-	-	-
2001	L, 2–0, Dayton	-	-
2002	W, 2–1, Michigan	W, 2–1, West Michigan	L, 3–1, Peoria
2003	W, 2–0, South Bend	W, 2–0, Battle Creek	W, 3–0, Beloit
2004	L, 2–1, West Michigan	-	-
2005	-	-	-
2006	W, 2–0, South Bend	L, 2–0, West Michigan	-
2007	L, 2–0, West Michigan	-	-
2008	L, 2–0, Dayton	-	-
2009	-	-	-
2010	-	-	-
2011	W, 2–1, Dayton	W, 2–0, Fort Wayne	L, 3–0, Quad Cities
2012	L, 2–0, Fort Wayne	-	-
2013	-	-	-
2014	-	-	-
2015	W, 2–0, Great Lakes	L, 2–1, West Michigan	-
2016	-	-	-
2017	-	-	-
2018	L, 2–0, Bowling Green	-	-
2019	-	-	-
2020	-	-	-
2021	-	-	-
2022	-	-	-
2023	-	-	-
2024	-	-	-
2025	-	-	-
2026	-	-	-

== Media coverage ==
Jesse Goldberg-Strassler broadcasts Lugnuts home and away games on WVFN-AM. WVFN previously aired Lugnuts games from 2001 to 2003.

Lugnuts games also aired on WJIM-AM from 1996 to 2000 and WQTX-FM from 2004 to 2016. Several games per season aired on WLNS-TV from 1996 through 2001. From 2002 to 2009, one game aired each season on WILX-TV.

== Alumni ==
The following are players in Major League Baseball who played, at one time, for the Lugnuts. This partial list includes players making injury-comeback starts as well as those that developed in Lansing.

=== Kansas City Royals ===
- Jeremy Affeldt
- Kevin Appier
- Carlos Beltrán
- Juan Brito
- Lance Carter
- Tim Collins
- Chad Durbin
- Carlos Febles
- Jeremy Giambi
- Mark Quinn
- José Santiago
- Andy Sisco
- Orber Moreno

=== Chicago Cubs ===
- Francis Beltrán
- Ronny Cedeño
- Rocky Cherry
- Robinson Chirinos
- Hee-seop Choi
- Juan Cruz
- Ryan Dempster
- Jake Fox
- Adam Greenberg
- Ángel Guzmán
- Rich Hill
- Jon Leicester
- Carlos Mármol
- Sean Marshall
- Juan Mateo
- Adalberto Méndez
- Sergio Mitre
- Orber Moreno
- Corey Patterson
- Billy Petrick
- Félix Pie
- Andy Pratt
- Mark Prior
- Clay Rapada
- Ryan Theriot
- Jermaine Van Buren
- Todd Wellemeyer
- Randy Wells
- Carlos Zambrano

=== Toronto Blue Jays ===
- Anthony Alford
- Henderson Álvarez
- Danny Barnes
- Chad Beck
- Jon Berti
- Bo Bichette
- Cavan Biggio
- Ryan Borucki
- Joel Carreño
- Miguel Castro
- Taylor Cole
- David Cooper
- Evan Crawford
- Jonathan Davis
- Matt Dermody
- Danny Farquhar
- José Fernández
- Graham Godfrey
- Ryan Goins
- Yan Gomes
- Kendall Graveman
- Vladimir Guerrero Jr.
- Adeiny Hechavarria
- Drew Hutchison
- Casey Janssen
- Danny Jansen
- Brett Lawrie
- Jesse Litsch
- Aaron Loup
- Trystan Magnuson
- Darin Mastroianni
- Tim Mayza
- Deck McGuire
- Brad Mills
- Daniel Norris
- Roberto Osuna
- Tyler Pastornicky
- Luis Perez
- Kevin Pillar
- Dalton Pompey
- Carlos Ramírez
- Sean Reid-Foley
- Jordan Romano
- Marc Rzepczynski
- Aaron Sanchez
- Anthony Sanders
- Justin Shafer
- Dwight Smith Jr.
- Travis Snider
- Marcus Stroman
- Noah Syndergaard
- Rowdy Tellez
- Ryan Tepera
- Curtis Thigpen
- Richard Ureña

=== Miami Marlins ===
- Anthony DeSclafani
- Jake Fishman
- Adam Greenberg
- Jake Marisnick
- Justin Nicolino
- Renyel Pinto
- Matt Treanor

=== St. Louis Cardinals ===
- Kiko Calero

=== San Francisco Giants ===
- Eugenio Vélez

== Roster ==
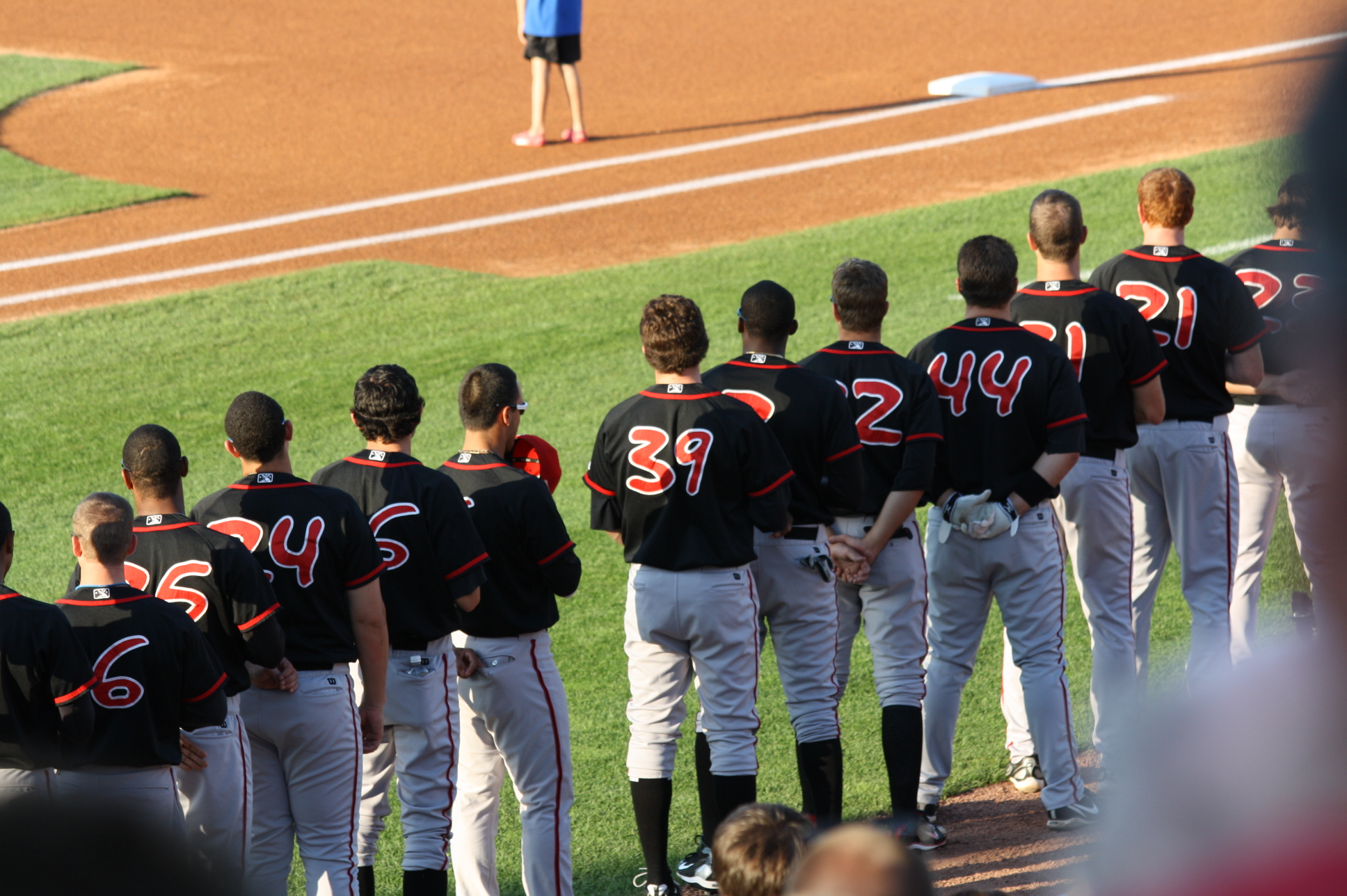
2010 Lugnuts wearing their away jerseys

Lansing Lugnuts roster
Players	Coaches/Other
Pitchers: 21 Ryan Brown; 43 Luis Carrasco; 13 Jose Dicochea; 17 Samuel Dutton; 18 Riley Huge; 31 Griffin Kirn; 30 Jorge Marcheco; 25 Abel Mercedes; 32 Mitch Myers; 26 Jackson Nove; 29 Tucker Novotny; 22 Jose Parra; 28 Darlin Pinales; 20 Gerlin Rosario; 10 Tzu-Chen Sha; 33 Chen Zhong-Ao Zhuang *; Catchers: 36 Bryan Arendt; 2 Dylan Fien; Infielders: 14 Daniel Bucciero; 1 Jared Davis; 8 Gunner Gouldsmith; 27 Tanner Marsh; 9 Myles Naylor; Outfielders: 5 Alex Fernandes; 24 Rodney Green Jr.; 4 Breyson Guedez; 37 Jake Reinisch	Manager: 19 Javier Goddard; Coaches: 12 Luis Baez (hitting); 15 Levi Kelly (pitching); 40 Ron Witmeyer (hitting); 60-day injured list: 34 Jack Mahoney; 7-day injured list; * On Athletics 40-man roster; ~ Development list; # Rehab assignment; ∞ Reserve list; ‡ Restricted list; § Suspended list; † Temporarily inactive list; Roster updated September 9, 2026; Transactions; → More rosters: MiLB • Midwest League; → Athletics minor league players
