= Yan Gomes =

Brazilian-American baseball player (born 1987)

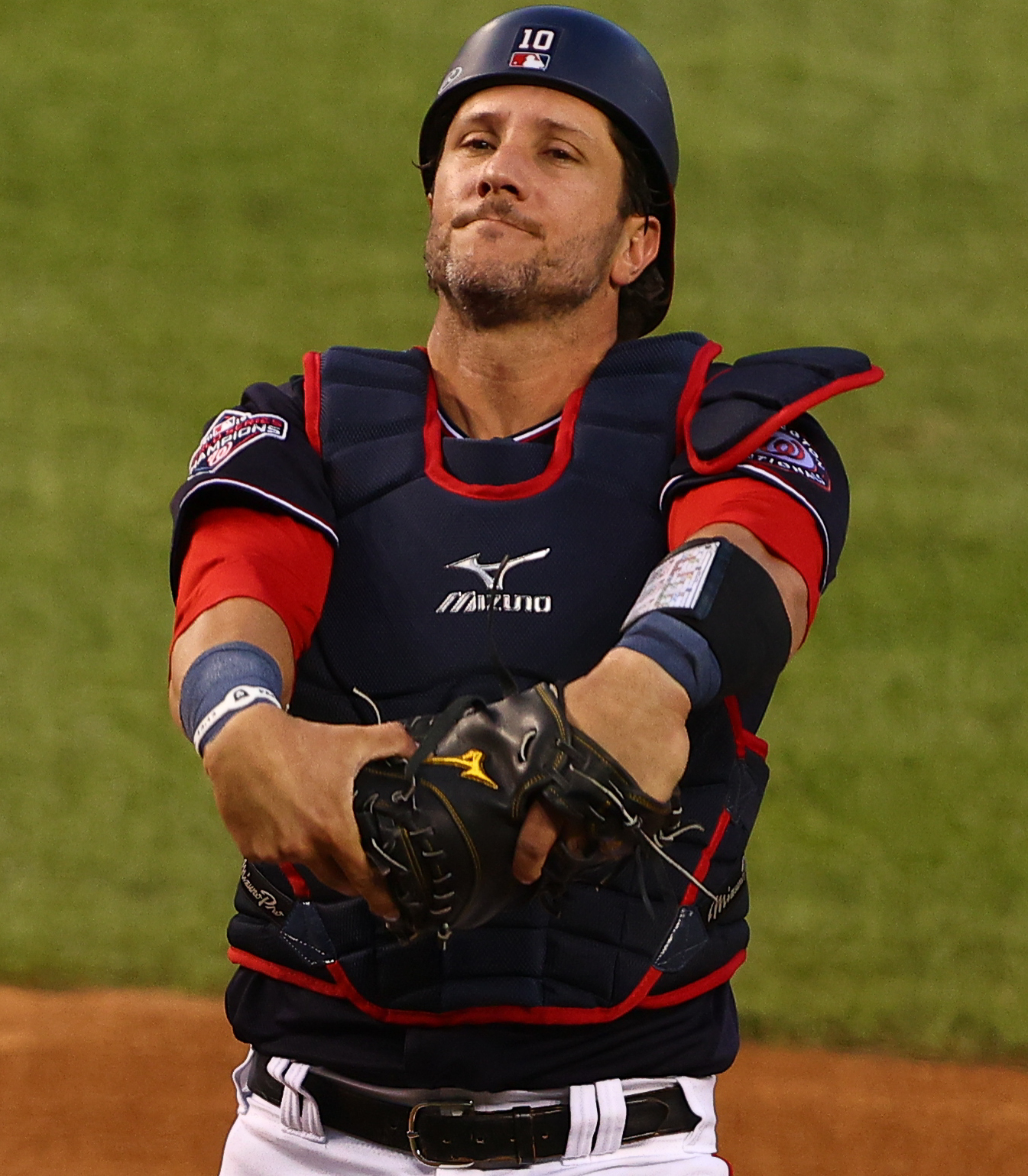
- Gomes with the Washington Nationals in 2020
- Catcher
- Born: July 19, 1987 (age 39); Mogi das Cruzes, São Paulo, Brazil
- Batted: Right Threw: Right

MLB debut
- May 17, 2012, for the Toronto Blue Jays

Last MLB appearance
- June 18, 2024, for the Chicago Cubs

MLB statistics
- Batting average: .246
- Home runs: 137
- Runs batted in: 517
- Stats at Baseball Reference

Teams
- Toronto Blue Jays (2012); Cleveland Indians (2013–2018); Washington Nationals (2019–2021); Oakland Athletics (2021); Chicago Cubs (2022–2024)

Career highlights and awards
- All-Star (2018); World Series champion (2019); Silver Slugger Award (2014)

Yan Gomes (/ˈjɑːn ˈɡoʊmz/; Portuguese: [ˈjɐ̃ ˈɡomis]; born July 19, 1987) is a Brazilian former professional baseball catcher. He played in Major League Baseball (MLB) for the Toronto Blue Jays, Cleveland Indians, Washington Nationals, Oakland Athletics, and Chicago Cubs.

The Blue Jays selected Gomes in the tenth round of the 2009 MLB draft. He made his MLB debut in 2012, becoming the first Brazilian-born player in major league history. He played for the Blue Jays in 2012 and the Indians from 2013 to 2018. He was traded to the Nationals ahead of the 2019 season and won the World Series with Washington. He was traded to Oakland during the 2021 season and signed with the Cubs following that season. Chicago released him during the 2024 season.

== Early life ==
Gomes was born in Mogi das Cruzes, Brazil. His mother moved the family to the United States when he was 12 after she got a job in Florida, and his father is a tennis instructor. He was introduced to baseball by a Cuban coach his father met in São Paulo.

== Amateur career ==
Gomes attended Miami Southridge High School in Miami, Florida, where he played for the school's baseball team. He enrolled at the University of Tennessee, where he played college baseball for the Tennessee Volunteers in the Southeastern Conference. At Tennessee, he started at every infield position except shortstop. He also spent a season as J. P. Arencibia's backup at catcher. After his first season with Tennessee, he was named an NCAA Division I Freshman All-American. In 2007, he played collegiate summer baseball for the Cotuit Kettleers of the Cape Cod Baseball League and returned to the league in 2008 to play for the Chatham A's.

Gomes was drafted by the Boston Red Sox in the 39th round of the 2008 Major League Baseball (MLB) draft, but he did not sign. After playing two seasons with the Volunteers, Gomes transferred to Barry University, where he played for the Barry Buccaneers in the Sunshine State Conference. He set school records with 92 runs batted in (RBI) and 172 total bases. He was named to the All-South regional team, and he was honored as the All-South player of the year and a Division II All-American.

== Professional career ==
=== Toronto Blue Jays ===
==== 2009–2011: minor leagues ====
After one season at Barry, the Toronto Blue Jays drafted Gomes in the tenth round of the 2009 MLB draft, and he signed on June 19 with an $85,000 signing bonus. Gomes made his professional debut with the Gulf Coast Blue Jays of the Rookie-level Gulf Coast League that June. After one week, he was promoted to the Auburn Doubledays of the Class A Short Season New York–Penn League. In 2010, he primarily played for the Dunedin Blue Jays of the High-A Florida State League, playing for one week with the Lansing Lugnuts of the Single-A Midwest League. Gomes played most of the 2011 season with the New Hampshire Fisher Cats of the Double-A Eastern League, receiving a brief promotion to the Las Vegas 51s of the Triple-A Pacific Coast League for one week in July. During his first three professional seasons, Gomes spent most of his time as a backup catcher, but he soon began to receive playing time at first base and third base as well, since he was behind top catching prospect Travis d'Arnaud in the Blue Jays' depth chart.

==== 2012: MLB debut ====
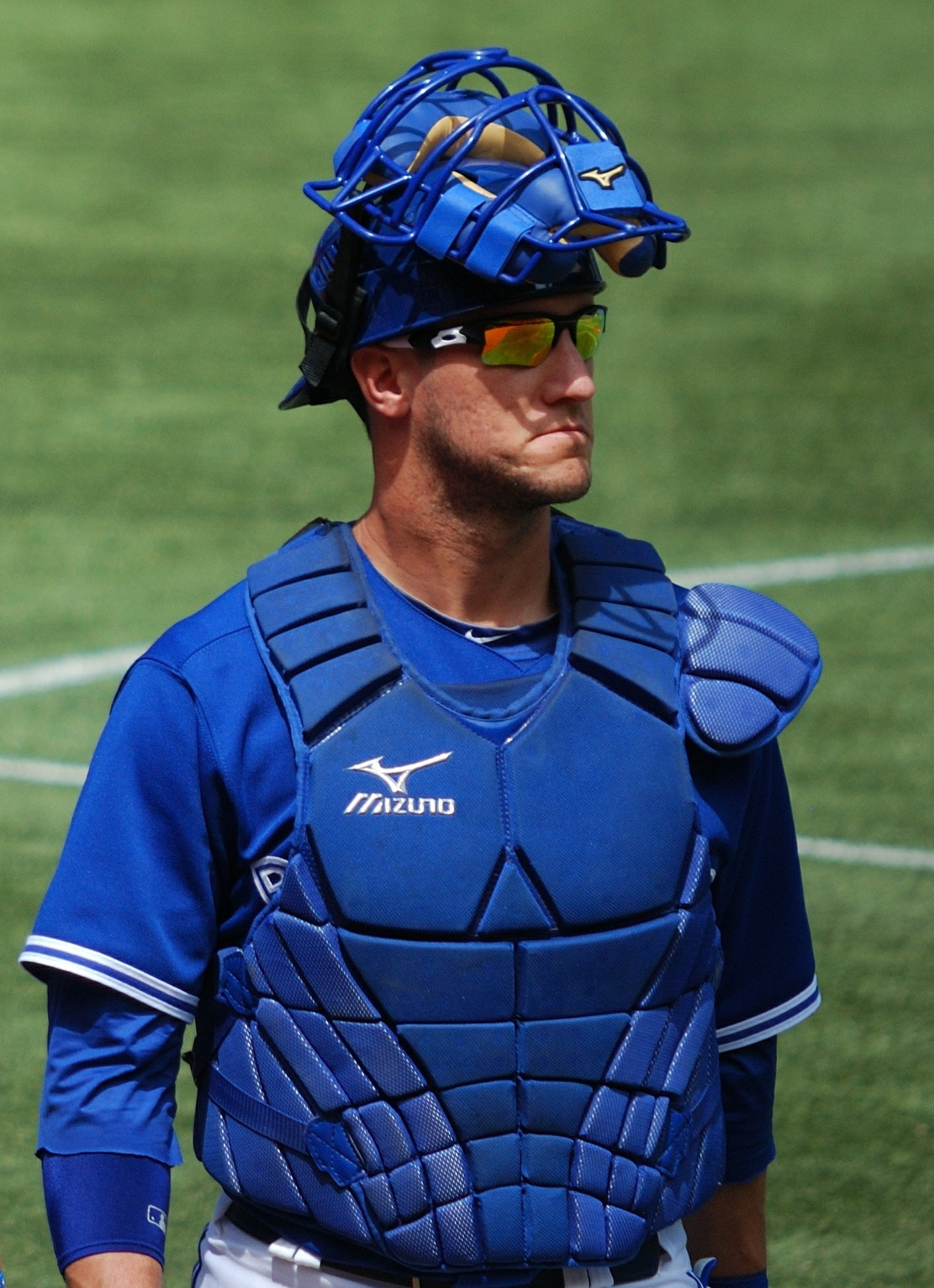
Gomes with the Toronto Blue Jays in 2012

After batting .359 with five home runs and 22 RBI at the start of the 2012 season with Las Vegas, Gomes was promoted on May 17, as the Blue Jays optioned the struggling Adam Lind to Las Vegas. In his MLB debut that night, Gomes became the first Brazilian player in MLB history. He got his first MLB hit in his debut, singling off Phil Hughes of the New York Yankees. On May 18, Gomes hit his first MLB home run on the first pitch off of New York Mets pitcher Jon Niese in a 14–5 win. Gomes was optioned back to Las Vegas on May 27. He hit 5-for-22 with two home runs in eight games. Gomes was recalled from Triple-A on June 5, with pitcher Jesse Chavez being optioned to make room for him. Gomes was sent back down to Triple-A on June 20 then was again recalled from Las Vegas on July 19. Pitcher Sam Dyson was optioned to Double-A New Hampshire Fisher Cats to make room on the roster. Gomes was optioned back to Las Vegas after an 11–2 loss to the Texas Rangers on August 19. Gomes was recalled to the Blue Jays active roster on September 7 after the 51s' season ended. He had a .204/.264/.367 slash line in 43 games in his rookie season.

=== Cleveland Indians ===
On November 3, 2012, the Blue Jays traded Gomes and Mike Avilés to the Cleveland Indians for pitcher Esmil Rogers. The Indians recalled Gomes from the Triple-A Columbus Clippers on April 9, 2013. Gomes' first hit as an Indian was a two-run home run on April 13 against the Chicago White Sox. He returned to Columbus on April 24 when Lou Marson came off the disabled list. Gomes was brought back up on April 28 when Marson was returned to the disabled list. On July 30, Gomes faced André Rienzo, the first Brazilian pitcher in MLB history. He finished 1-for-2 with a walk and a single off Rienzo. He made his postseason debut in the Wild Card Game, batting 2-for-4 with a double as Cleveland lost to the Tampa Bay Rays.

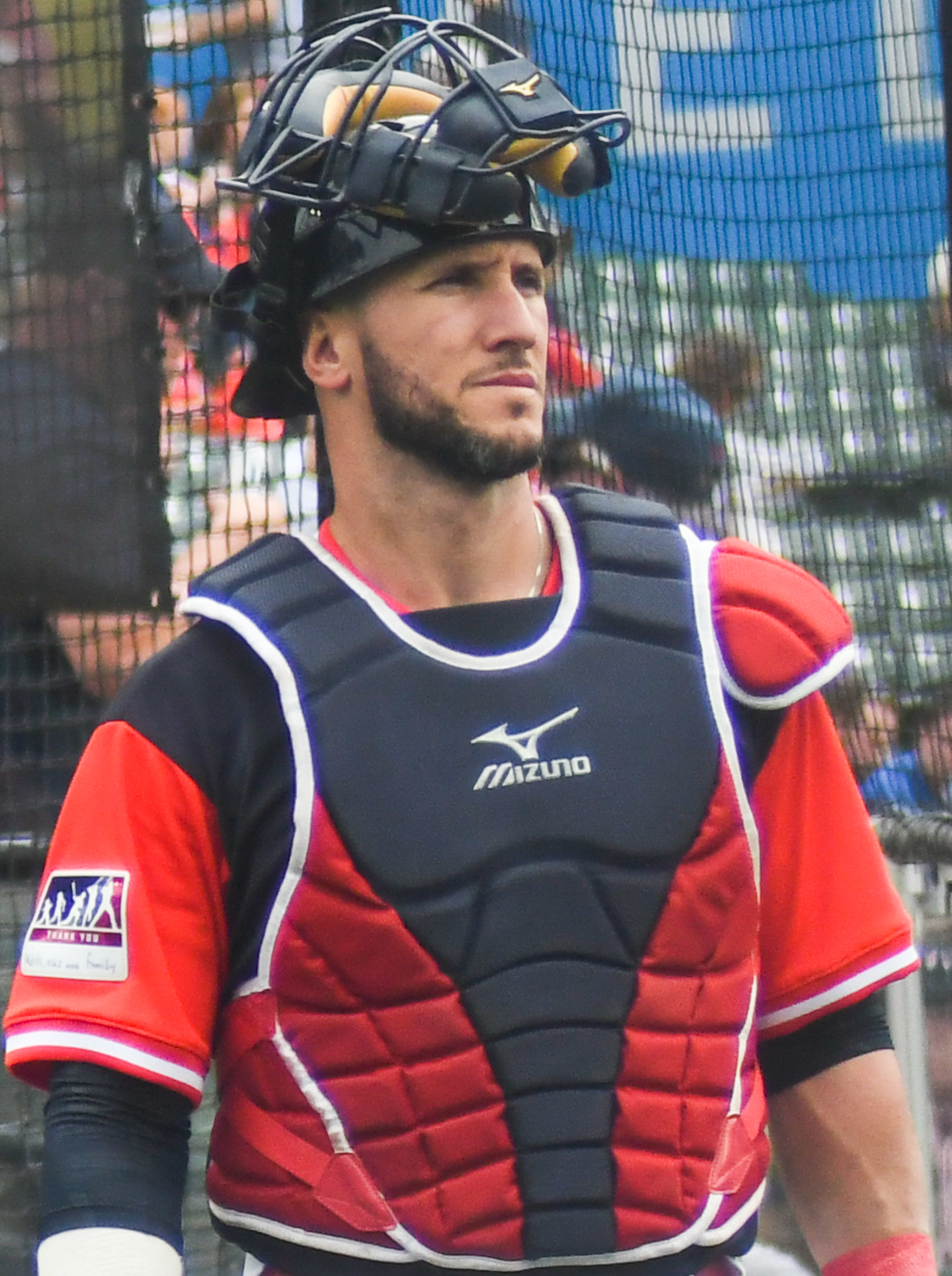
Gomes with Cleveland in 2017

Gomes and the Indians agreed to a six-year, $23 million contract extension on March 31, 2014. In 2014, he batted .278/.313/.472, winning the Silver Slugger Award for American League catchers. In 2015, he batted .231/.267/.391. In 2016, he batted .167/.201/.327. His .127 batting average against right-handers was the lowest of all MLB hitters with at least 140 plate appearances. Gomes only postseason action was as a defensive replacement in four World Series games. He went 0-for-4 as a backup to Roberto Pérez.

On August 9, 2017, Gomes hit a walk-off three-run home run against Colorado Rockies in a 4–1 win, his second career walk-off home run in his career. In 2017 he batted .232/.309/.399.

Batting .251 with ten home runs and 31 RBIs, Gomes was named to the 2018 MLB All-Star Game. He became the first male Brazilian player to be featured in an All-Star Game in an American sports league. In 2018, he batted .266/.313/.449.

=== Washington Nationals ===
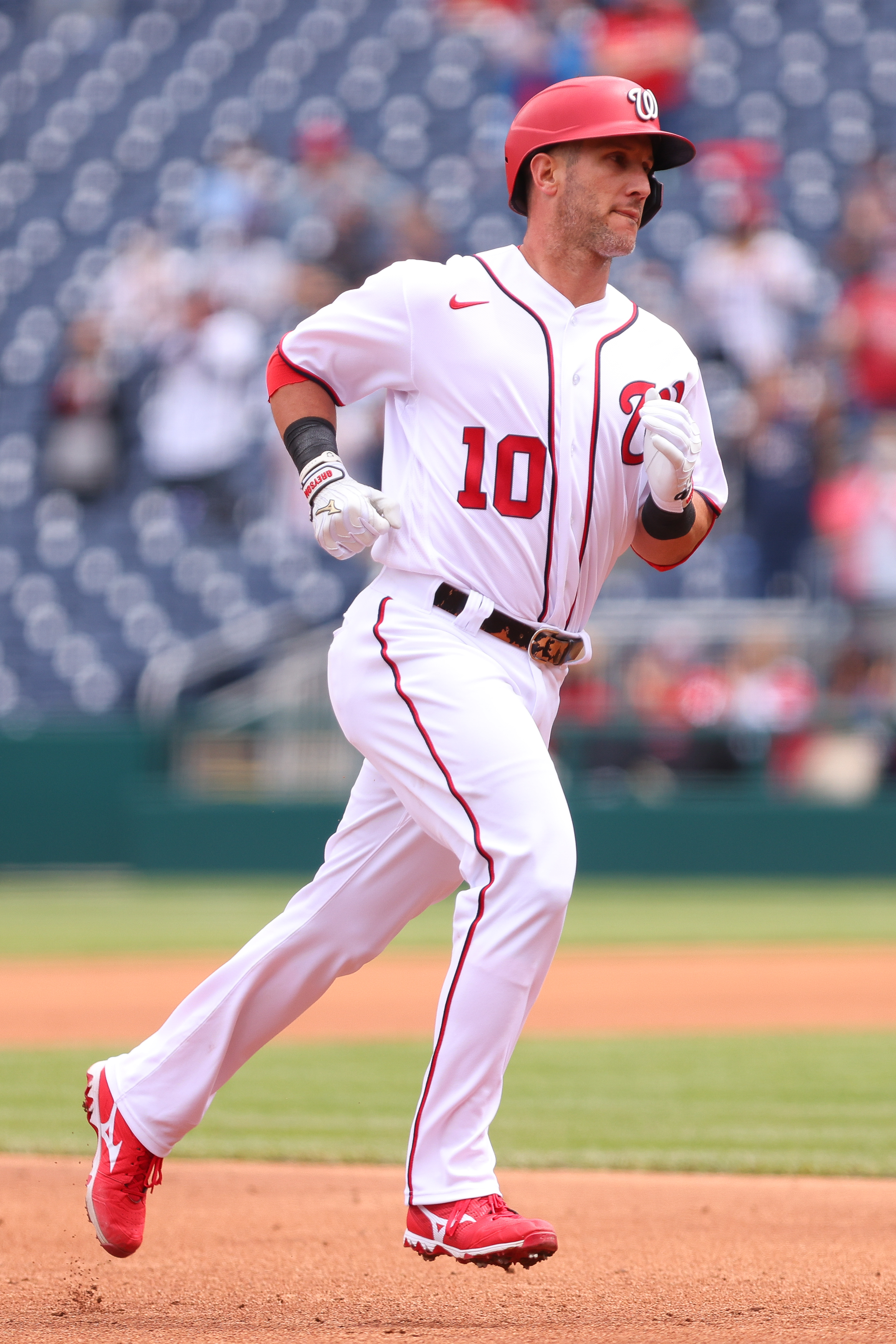
Gomes with the Nationals in 2020

On November 30, 2018, Gomes was traded to the Washington Nationals for right-handed pitcher Jefry Rodríguez, minor league outfielder Daniel Johnson, and a player to be named later, later announced as Andruw Monasterio. In 2019, he batted .223/.316/.389 with 12 home runs and 43 RBIs, and won the World Series title, catching the final out of the series-clinching Game 7, which was a Daniel Hudson strikeout of Michael Brantley. The Nationals declined a club option for $9 million to keep Gomes for the 2020 season, making him a free agent.

On December 10, 2019, Gomes re-signed with Washington on a two-year, $10 million contract. In the shortened 2020 season, Gomes batted .284/.319/.468 with 4 home runs and 13 RBIs in 30 games.

=== Oakland Athletics ===
On July 30, 2021, Gomes was traded to the Oakland Athletics along with Josh Harrison for Drew Millas, Richard Guasch, and Seth Shuman. After having a .778 on-base plus slugging (OPS) to start the year with Washington, Gomes cooled off, posting a .631 OPS with Oakland, which failed to make the playoffs.

=== Chicago Cubs ===
On December 1, 2021, Gomes signed a two-year $13 million contract with a club option for 2024 with the Chicago Cubs. He played in 86 games in 2022, hitting .235/.260/.365 with eight home runs and 31 RBI. Gomes played in 116 games for Chicago in 2023, batting .267/.315/.408 with 10 home runs and 63 RBI.

The Cubs exercised the $6 million option for Gomes for the 2024 season. In 2024, Gomes played in 34 games and batted .154/.179/.242 with two home runs and seven RBI. On June 19, Gomes was designated for assignment after the Cubs signed Tomás Nido. He was released by the Cubs on two days later.

== International career ==
Gomes helped the Brazil national team qualify for its first-ever berth in the World Baseball Classic (WBC) by leading them out of the 2013 WBC qualifying round. He was the only major leaguer on Brazil's team for the qualifiers and helped his team advance despite the other teams in the pool at the time boasting several major leaguers. He opted not to participate in the 2013 WBC to focus on winning a spot on the Cleveland's Opening Day roster.

== Personal life ==
Gomes married Jenna Hammaker, daughter of former All-Star pitcher Atlee Hammaker, in 2012. They have three children, a daughter born in 2014 and sons born in 2017 and 2021. They reside in Knoxville, Tennessee. Gomes is a Christian.
