= Chad Beck =

American baseball player (born 1985)

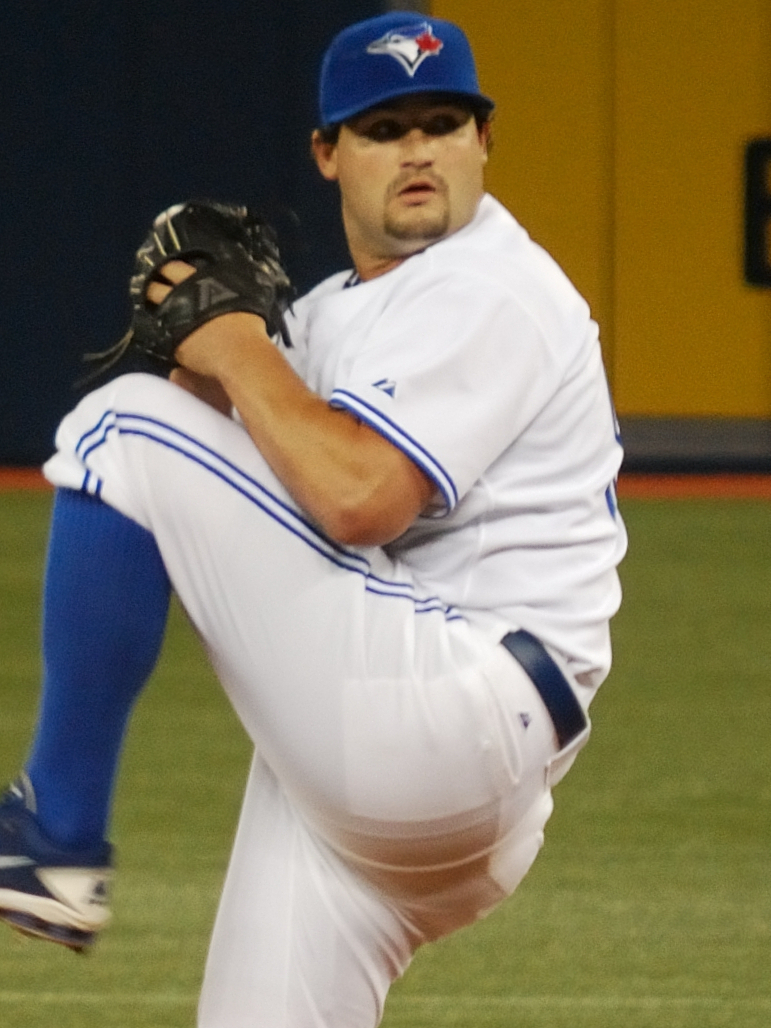
- Beck pitching for the Toronto Blue Jays in 2012
- Pitcher
- Born: January 17, 1985 (age 41); Jasper, Texas, U.S.
- Batted: Right Threw: Right

MLB debut
- September 13, 2011, for the Toronto Blue Jays

Last appearance
- October 1, 2012, for the Toronto Blue Jays

MLB statistics
- Win–loss record: 0–0
- Earned run average: 5.50
- Strikeouts: 12
- Stats at Baseball Reference

Teams
- Toronto Blue Jays (2011–2012)

Chad Lee Beck (born January 17, 1985) is an American former professional baseball pitcher. He has played in Major League Baseball for the Toronto Blue Jays.

== Early career ==
Beck attended Woodville High School, Panola College, and the University of Louisiana at Lafayette, where he played for the Louisiana–Lafayette Ragin' Cajuns baseball team.

Beck was drafted by the Toronto Blue Jays in the 43rd round of the 2004 Major League Baseball draft, but did not sign. He signed with the Arizona Diamondbacks after being selected in the 14th round of the 2006 Major League Baseball draft.

== Major league career ==
=== Arizona Diamondbacks ===
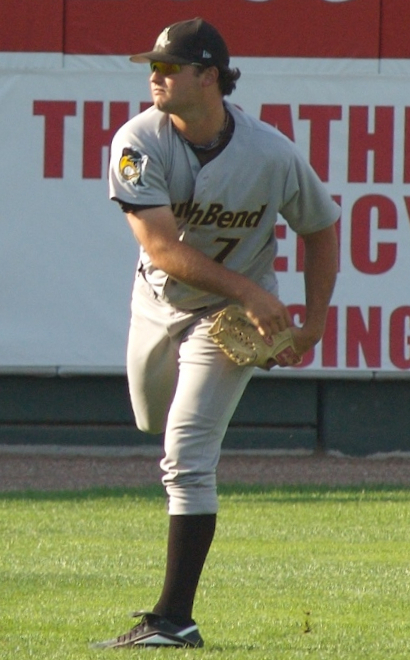
Beck during his tenure with the South Bend Silver Hawks, single-A affiliates of the Arizona Diamondbacks, in 2007.

Beck began his professional baseball career in 2006, as he appeared in 16 games with the Yakima Bears of the Northwest League, going 1–5 with a 6.25 ERA im 40.1 innings pitched.

In 2007, Beck moved up to the South Bend Silver Hawks of the Midwest League, where he appeared in 31 games, all in relief, as he had a 1–2 record with a 4.33 ERA in 52 innings pitched

He began the 2008 season with South Bend, working out of the bullpen, as in seven games, he posted a 2–0 record with a 2.04 ERA, earning 19 strikeouts in 17.2 innings pitched. Beck was then promoted to the Visalia Oaks of the California League. With the Oaks, Beck appeared in 25 games, making 15 starts, as he had a 6–5 record with a 3.98 ERA in 95 innings pitched. On August 31, 2008, the Diamondbacks organization traded Beck to the Toronto Blue Jays for David Eckstein.

=== Toronto Blue Jays ===
Beck began his first season with the Blue Jays organization in 2009, as he played with the Lansing Lugnuts of the Midwest League as a starting pitcher. In 20 starts, Beck had a 6–8 record with a 5.94 ERA. Beck also played with the Dunedin Blue Jays of the Florida State League, where he made nine appearances out of the bullpen, going 0–0 with a 4.35 ERA, striking out 14 hitters in 10.1 innings pitched.

Beck spent the entire 2010 season with Dunedin, playing in 41 games, making 11 starts for the team. Beck put up a 3–6 record with a 3.72 ERA in 101.2 innings pitched.

The 2011 season began in Dunedin once again for Beck, however he appeared in only one game, allowing one run in 5.1 innings pitched, striking out seven hitters as he earned a no-decision. The Blue Jays moved Beck up to the New Hampshire Fisher Cats of the Eastern League. Beck posted solid numbers with the Fisher Cats, going 7–4 with a 3.69 ERA in 22 games, starting 14 of them. Beck was then promoted again, moving to the Las Vegas 51s of the Pacific Coast League. Beck made eight starts with Las Vegas, going 2–4 with a 6.70 ERA in 41.2 innings pitched. On September 6, 2011, Beck was promoted once again, as the Toronto Blue Jays called him up to the Major Leagues.

Beck made his MLB debut on September 13, 2011, as Beck faced one batter against the Boston Red Sox at Fenway Park in the eighth inning. On the first pitch Beck threw, Red Sox hitter Dustin Pedroia flew out to center field. Boston won the game by a score of 18–6. On September 21, 2011, Beck earned his first strikeout, as he struck out Torii Hunter of the Los Angeles Angels of Anaheim in the ninth inning at the Rogers Centre. Beck finished the season playing in three games with Toronto, going 0–0 with a 0.00 ERA in 2.1 innings pitched.

Beck began the 2012 season with the Triple-A Las Vegas 51s, where he went 1–0 with a 1.31 ERA in 19 games before being promoted to the Toronto Blue Jays on May 27. However, he was promptly set back down to Triple-A the following day, without having appeared in a major league game.

Beck was recalled by the Jays on July 15, and was optioned back to Triple-A on July 26. Beck was recalled on August 22 when Yunel Escobar was placed on paternity leave. Beck was optioned back to Las Vegas on August 24 when José Bautista was activated from the disabled list. Beck returned to the Blue Jays on September 4 when rosters expanded and the Las Vegas season ended. On October 22, 2012, the Blue Jays claimed Bobby Wilson from the Los Angeles Angels of Anaheim and designated Beck for assignment.

The Pittsburgh Pirates claimed Beck off waivers from the Blue Jays on October 25, 2012. Beck was designated for assignment on December 26 to make room on the roster after the Joel Hanrahan trade. Beck was claimed by the Blue Jays on January 4, 2013. Beck was again designated for assignment on January 10, 2013, to make room on the roster for Tommy Hottovy. Beck was outrighted to the Buffalo Bisons on January 15. Beck started the 2013 season with the Double-A New Hampshire Fisher Cats. Beck was promoted to the Bisons on May 7, where he pitched in 8 games before going on the disabled list and missing June and July. He returned to game action in August, pitching for the GCL Blue Jays, before returning to New Hampshire to make one appearance before the season ended. In 30 combined games (1 start), he went 3–1 with a 4.06 ERA and 7 saves, striking out 35 in 37.2 innings pitched.

To finish his career he signed with the independent league Lancaster Barnstormers to start the 2014 season.

He became a free agent after the 2015 season.

== Pitching style ==
Beck threw four pitch pitches. He had a four-seam fastball at 94–97 mph, a two-seamer at 92–95, and a slider and changeup in the high 80s.
