= Casey Janssen =

American baseball player (born 1981)

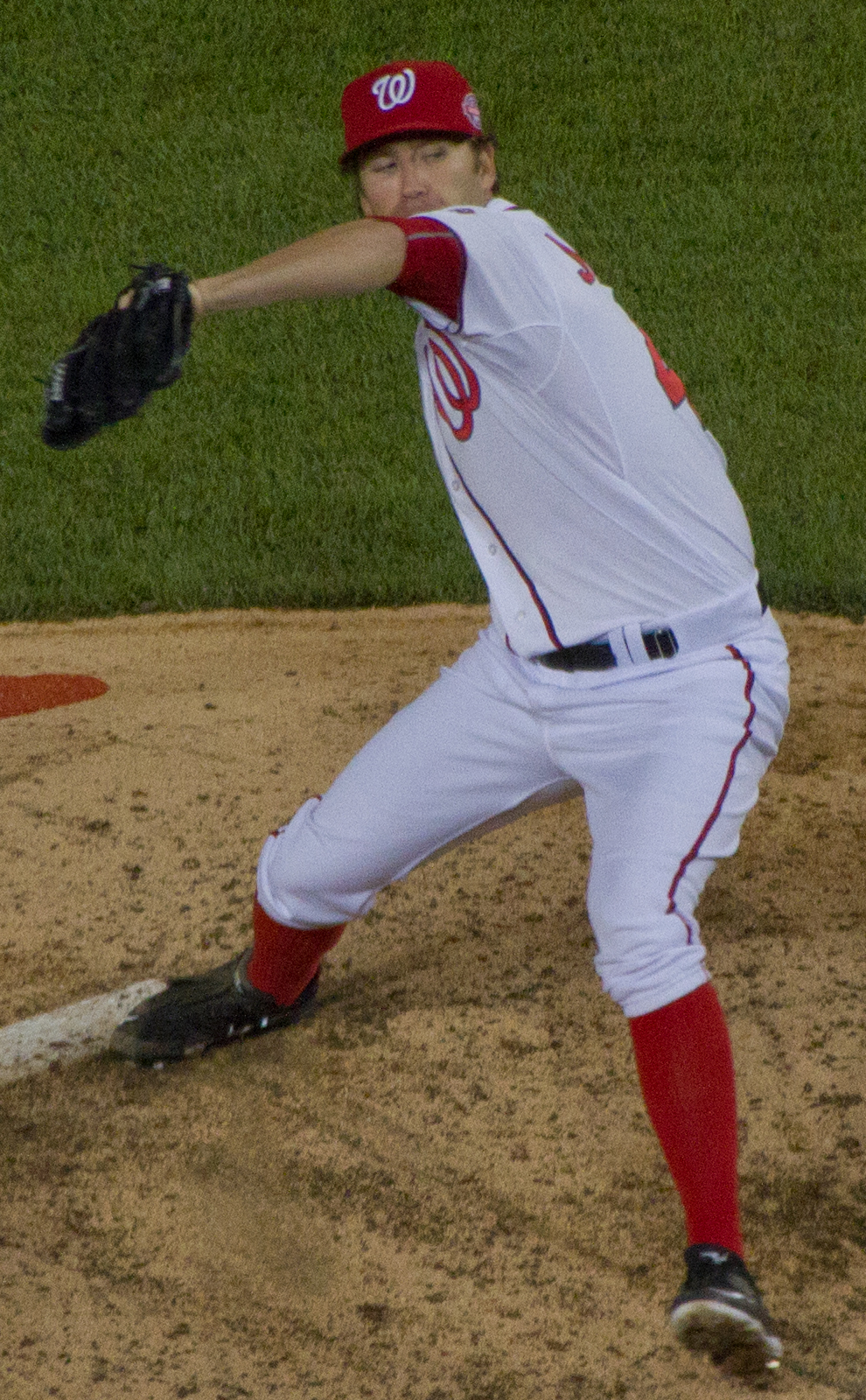
- Janssen with the Washington Nationals
- Pitcher
- Born: September 17, 1981 (age 44); Orange, California, U.S.
- Batted: Right Threw: Right

MLB debut
- April 27, 2006, for the Toronto Blue Jays

Last MLB appearance
- October 3, 2015, for the Washington Nationals

MLB statistics
- Win–loss record: 31–29
- Earned run average: 3.63
- Strikeouts: 395
- Saves: 90
- Stats at Baseball Reference

Teams
- Toronto Blue Jays (2006–2007, 2009–2014); Washington Nationals (2015)

Robert Casey Janssen (born September 17, 1981) is an American former professional baseball pitcher. He pitched for two seasons in various levels of the Toronto Blue Jays' minor league organization before his debut in 2006 as a starting pitcher. Janssen was moved to the bullpen as a middle reliever and spot starter from 2007 to 2011, and in 2012 he was put in the closing role. Janssen also played for the Washington Nationals.

== High school career ==
Janssen was born in Orange, California, and raised in Huntington Beach, California, graduating from Fountain Valley High School in Fountain Valley, California. At Fountain Valley, Janssen was a three-year letter winner, and set single-season records at the school for home runs (12), RBIs (44), and triples (5). In his senior season, Janssen also pitched 40 innings with a 2.12 ERA and had 56 strikeouts.

== College career ==
Janssen attended University of California, Los Angeles (UCLA), where he played college baseball for the UCLA Bruins baseball team. In his first season, Janssen pitched as a fourth starter and long reliever, and held a record of 2–3 with a 5.57 ERA, but excelled in relief appearances, and also went 2–9 with a home run as a pinch hitter. In his second season, Janssen played first base and was a starter, finishing the season with a 4.06 ERA and a strikeout-walk ratio of 2.0 before an injury prematurely ended his season. During his junior season, Janssen went 6–6 with a 5.88 ERA and 73 strikeouts, while also making appearances at first base and as a designated hitter. Janssen was the number one starter for his senior season, and went 10-4 with a 3.16 ERA.

In 2001, he played summer league baseball for the Wisconsin Woodchucks of the Northwoods League.

== Professional career ==
=== Toronto Blue Jays ===
==== 2006–2010 ====
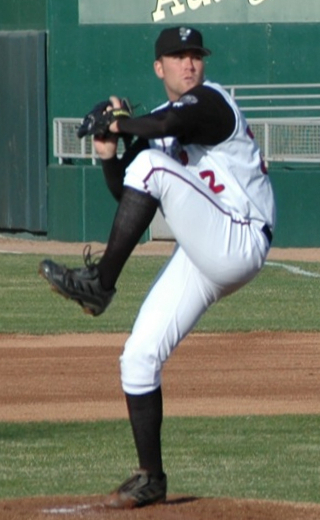
Janssen during his tenure with the Lansing Lugnuts, single-A affiliates of the Blue Jays, in 2005

The Toronto Blue Jays selected Janssen out of UCLA in the fourth round of the 2004 draft. He made his professional debut for the Low-A Auburn Doubledays, posting a 3-1 record and 3.48 ERA in 10 games. He split the 2005 season between the Single-A Lansing Lugnuts, the High-A Dunedin Blue Jays, and the Double-A New Hampshire Fisher Cats, recording a cumulative 13-4 record and 2.18 ERA with 136 strikeouts in 148.2 innings of work. He began the 2006 season with the Triple-A Syracuse Chiefs.

When an injury to A. J. Burnett created an opening in the Blue Jays' rotation, Janssen was promoted from Syracuse and made his major-league debut against the Baltimore Orioles on April 27, 2006.

Janssen won his first two games against the Los Angeles Angels, both times posting solid outings, allowing fewer than three hits over seven innings each.

In 2007, with multiple injuries to the Blue Jays rotation and bullpen, Janssen made a move to the bullpen and performed very well as the set-up man for interim closer Jeremy Accardo. He led the bullpen in innings pitched, and was second in team saves with six. Janssen established himself as one of the best in the Toronto Blue Jays bullpen as well as in the American League.

Janssen missed the entire 2008 season with a torn labrum. He was expected to make a full recovery and to be ready for Spring Training 2009 either out of the bullpen or as a starter, but suffered a setback and did not make the Opening Day 2009 roster for Toronto. On May 23, 2009, Janssen returned to action facing the Atlanta Braves in interleague play, going 6 innings and giving up 8 hits and 3 earned runs in a 4–3 decision giving him his first loss of the season.

On June 17, 2009, it was announced that Janssen was placed on the 15-day disabled list, retroactive to June 14, with inflammation of his right shoulder.

Janssen made 56 appearances in 2010, garnering a 5–2 record with a 3.67 ERA.

==== 2011–2012 ====
Janssen had a fantastic season in 2011, recording a 6–0 record with a career-low 2.26 ERA in 55 appearances. Janssen also recorded 2 saves, beginning his transition into the new Blue Jays closer.

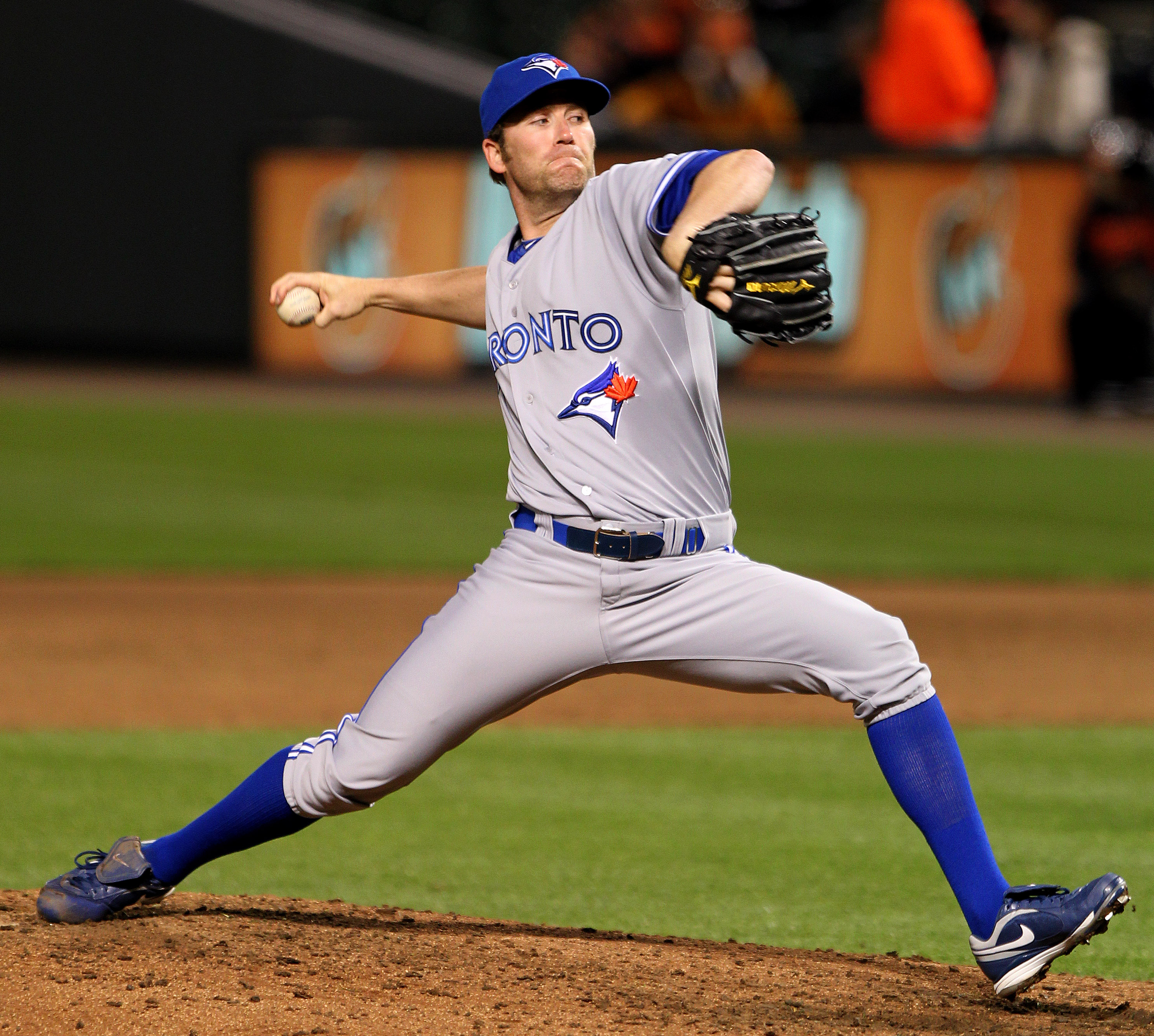
Janssen pitching for the Toronto Blue Jays in 2012

On February 13, 2012, Janssen signed a two-year, $5.9 million extension with the Blue Jays. His deal included a $4 million club option for 2014. He earned $2 million in 2012 and $3.9 million in 2013. In arbitration, Janssen asked for $2.2 million, but the Jays countered with $1.8 million. His contract covered his final arbitration year and his first free-agent year. He was scheduled to have an arbitration hearing the next day.

On November 16, 2012, Janssen had surgery to repair "lingering AC joint soreness". Janssen was voted by the Baseball Writers' Association of America (BBWAA) as the top Blue Jays pitcher of 2012, narrowly edging out Brandon Morrow. On February 5, 2013, manager John Gibbons said that, barring injury, Janssen would have the closer role for the start of the 2013 regular season, over teammate Sergio Santos. Janssen recorded a career-high 22 saves in 2012.

==== 2013–2014 ====
Janssen opened the 2013 season with 12 consecutive saves before blowing his first save of the season on June 8, against the Texas Rangers. The Blue Jays would come back to win the game 4–3 in 18 innings, the longest game in franchise history (at the time). On August 4, in a game against the Los Angeles Angels of Anaheim, Janssen earned his 50th career save. He recorded his 30th save of the 2013 season against the Baltimore Orioles on September 14.

Janssen began the 2014 season on the disabled list with a back strain. He was activated off the disabled list on May 11, 2014, after Chris Getz was designated for assignment. Janssen's 10th save of the season came against the Detroit Tigers on June 5. Coming in with two outs in the 9th inning, Janssen needed only one pitch to complete the save, earning his second career one-pitch save and the first in the majors since Jim Johnson did so against the Jays on July 12, 2013. Though he would struggle after the All-Star break, Janssen remained the closer for Toronto for the rest of the 2014 season. He made his final appearance of the season, as well as the final appearance of his tenure with the Blue Jays, on September 28 against the Baltimore Orioles. Janssen pitched in a non-save situation and needed just 6 pitches to retire the side in the 9th inning. He finished the 2014 season with a 3–3 record, 3.94 ERA, 28 strikeouts, and 25 saves in 30 opportunities.

=== Washington Nationals ===
On February 2, 2015, Janssen signed a one-year contract with the Washington Nationals for the 2015 season, with a mutual option for the 2016 season. He appeared in 48 games for the Nationals in 2015, posting a 2–5 record, 4.95 ERA, and 27 strikeouts in 40 innings pitched. On November 2, 2015, the Nationals declined Janssen's option, making him a free agent.

=== San Diego Padres ===
On February 20, 2016, Janssen signed a minor league contract with the San Diego Padres that included an invitation to spring training. He was released on March 24.

=== Boston Red Sox ===
On June 16, 2016, Janssen signed a minor league contract with the Boston Red Sox. Janssen recorded a 2.87 ERA in 14 appearances between the Triple-A Pawtucket Red Sox and the Low-A Lowell Spinners before he opted out of his contract and was released on August 7.

=== Acereros de Monclova ===
On February 21, 2017, Janssen signed with the Acereros de Monclova of the Mexican League. Janssen posted an 0-3 record and 4.30 ERA in 15 appearances for Monclova before he was released on May 16, 2017.

== Pitching style ==
Janssen relies mostly on a four-seam fastball in the 91–93 mph range, and a cutter at 90–91. He also features a sweeping curveball (76–78), a two-seam fastball (low 90s), and a slider (mid-80s). The slider is almost exclusively used against right-handed hitters, with the two-seamer being its replacement against left-handers. Janssen's curveball has become an excellent "out pitch"; in 2012, batters hit .128 against it, and its whiff rate was 39%.

Janssen has become an excellent control pitcher, walking only 1.6 batters per 9 innings in 2012. He has emphasized a low walk rate in becoming a successful pitcher: "I pride myself, as much as I can, in not walking hitters. ... I can live with giving up hits—they're going to happen—but walks are tougher to swallow."
