= Henderson Álvarez =

Venezuelan baseball player (born 1990)

Henderson Álvarez III
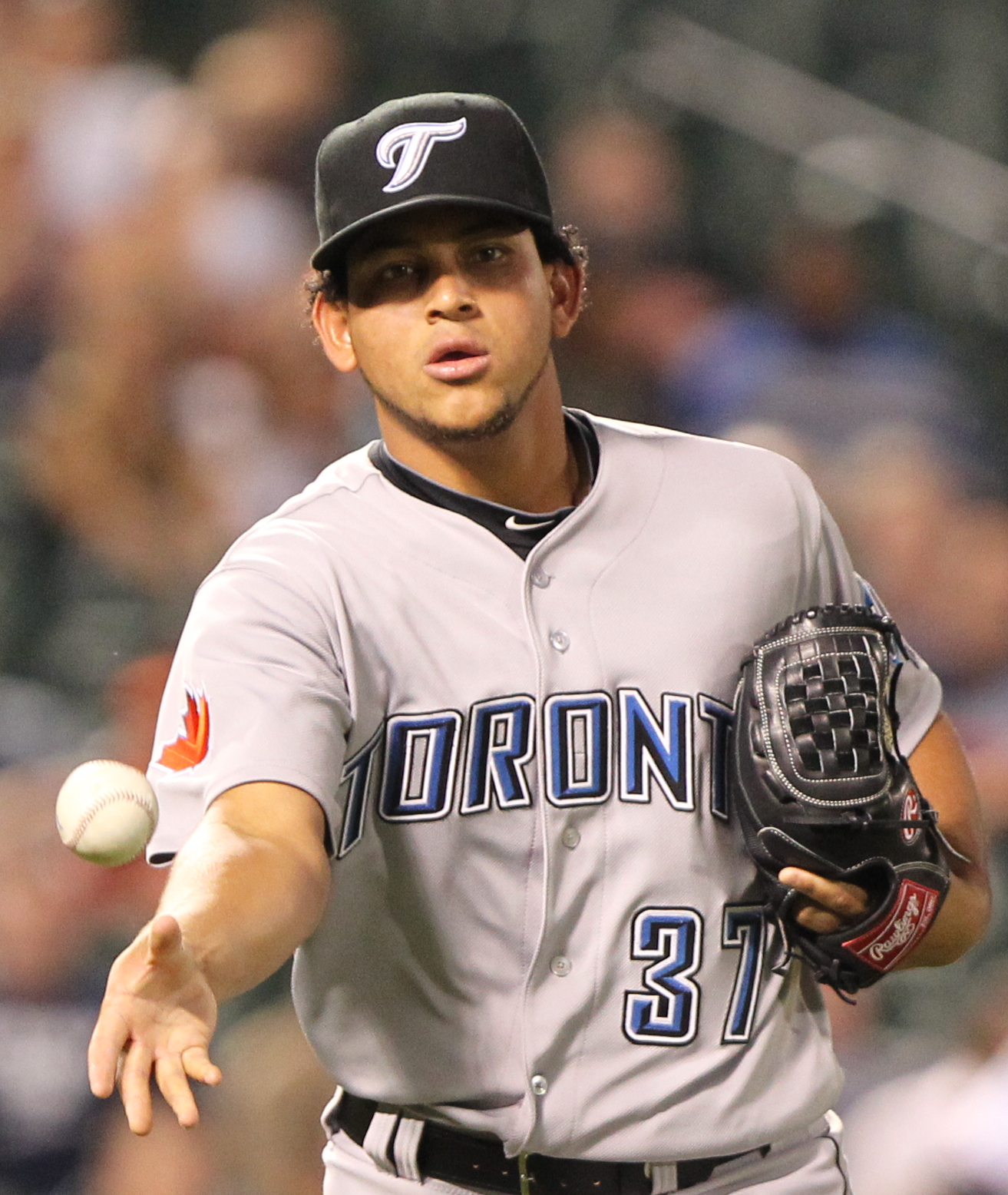
- Álvarez with the Toronto Blue Jays

Free agent
- Starting pitcher
- Born: April 18, 1990 (age 36); Valencia, Carabobo, Venezuela
- Bats: Right Throws: Right

MLB debut
- August 10, 2011, for the Toronto Blue Jays

MLB statistics (through 2017 season)
- Win–loss record: 27–35
- Earned run average: 3.82
- Strikeouts: 302
- WHIP: 1.30
- Stats at Baseball Reference

Teams
- Toronto Blue Jays (2011–2012); Miami Marlins (2013–2015); Philadelphia Phillies (2017)

Career highlights and awards
- All-Star (2014); Pitched a no-hitter on September 29, 2013

Henderson Javier Álvarez (born April 18, 1990) is a Venezuelan professional baseball pitcher who is a free agent. He has previously played in Major League Baseball (MLB) for the Toronto Blue Jays from 2011 through 2012, the Miami Marlins from 2013 through 2015, and the Philadelphia Phillies in 2017.

Álvarez debuted in MLB with the Blue Jays in 2011, and was traded to the Marlins after the 2012 season. He threw a no-hitter for the Marlins on the last day of the 2013 season, and was named an MLB All-Star during the 2014 season. He did not pitch in MLB during the 2016 season due to a shoulder injury.

== Early life ==
Henderson Javier Álvarez was born on April 18, 1990, in Valencia, Carabobo, Venezuela.

== Professional career ==
=== Minor leagues ===
Álvarez signed with the Toronto Blue Jays as an international free agent, and made his professional baseball debut in 2007 with the Dominican Summer Blue Jays of the Rookie-level Dominican Summer League, pitching to a 1–2 win–loss record with a 5.61 earned run average (ERA).

Álvarez subsequently moved to the United States, where he pitched for the Gulf Coast Blue Jays of the Rookie-level Gulf Coast League, going 1–4 with a 5.63 ERA and a strikeout to walk ratio of 5.67. He was promoted to the Lansing Lugnuts of the Single–A Midwest League for the 2009 season, where he was an All-Star with a 9–6 win–loss record and a 3.47 ERA. He played 2010 with the Dunedin Blue Jays of the High–A Florida State League. He was named an All-Star and was selected to appear in the All-Star Futures Game, finishing the season with an 8–7 record with a 4.33 ERA. He started the 2011 season with Dunedin, but was promoted after two starts to the New Hampshire Fisher Cats of the Double–A Eastern League. He was again named an All-Star and made his second appearance in the Futures Game, finishing the year with an 8–4 record and a 2.86 ERA.

=== Toronto Blue Jays (2011–2012) ===
On August 9, 2011, the Blue Jays promoted Álvarez to the major leagues. He took the rotation spot of Carlos Villanueva, and made his major league debut on August 10 against the Oakland Athletics pitching 5 2/3 innings and giving up 3 earned runs on 8 hits, with 4 strikeouts and 1 walk.

On August 31, Álvarez recorded his first major league win in a 13–0 victory over the Baltimore Orioles. He pitched eight full innings, giving up three hits, no walks and recording five strikeouts. At 21 years and 135 days, Álvarez becomes the youngest Blue Jays' pitcher to record a win since Kelvim Escobar in 1997, and the youngest starting pitcher to record the win for the Jays since Phil Huffman in 1979. He made 10 starts for the Blue Jays, going 1–3 in 63 2/3 innings. He issued eight walks while striking out 40.

On May 4, 2012, Álvarez threw his first career complete game and shutout, defeating the Los Angeles Angels of Anaheim 4–0. With teammate Brandon Morrow throwing a shutout the previous night, they became the first Blue Jays to throw back-to-back shutouts since Jack Morris and Al Leiter on June 16 and 17, 1993. Álvarez finished the 2012 season with a 9–14 record and a 4.85 ERA in 31 starts. He struck out 79 batters in 187 1/3 innings pitched, which resulted in the lowest strikeout rates in the Majors (3.80 K/9) in 2012.

=== Miami Marlins (2013–2015) ===
On November 19, 2012, the Blue Jays traded Álvarez to the Miami Marlins along with Adeiny Hechavarria, Jeff Mathis, Yunel Escobar, Jake Marisnick, Anthony DeSclafani, and Justin Nicolino in exchange for Mark Buehrle, Josh Johnson, José Reyes, John Buck, and Emilio Bonifacio. Alvarez spent most of the first half of the 2013 regular season on the disabled list with right shoulder inflammation. He was activated from the 60-day disabled list on July 4, and made his first start as a Marlin that night against the Atlanta Braves. Álvarez received a no-decision in his Marlins debut, pitching five innings and giving up three earned runs in a 4–3 win. Álvarez earned his first win as a Marlin on July 26, against the Pittsburgh Pirates.

On September 29, 2013, the final game of the Marlins 2013 season, Álvarez threw the 282nd no-hitter in MLB history, in a game against the Detroit Tigers. He allowed three base runners on an error, a walk, and a hit batter as the Marlins walked off in the bottom of the ninth inning on a wild pitch, 1–0. He became the first pitcher to throw a no-hitter in the final game of the regular season since Mike Witt in 1984, when he did so for the California Angels. Álvarez finished the 2013 season with a 5–6 record in 17 starts. Through 17 starts, Álvarez pitched 102 2/3 innings while allowing just two home runs. The previous season he had allowed 29 home runs.

Álvarez opened the 2014 season with two complete game shutouts in his first seven starts. He was named an All-Star. After earning an 8–5 record with a 2.48 ERA and a league-leading three shutouts, Álvarez went on the disabled list on August 1 with shoulder inflammation. before being activated on August 16. He finished the 2014 season with a 12–7 record, the most wins for a Marlins pitcher, and a 2.65 ERA with 111 strikeouts.

The Marlins named Álvarez their Opening Day starting pitcher in 2015. In April 2015, Álvarez went on the disabled list when an MRI revealed inflammation in his shoulder and elbow. After going 0–4 with an ERA over 6.00, he was declared out for the season after undergoing shoulder surgery on July 28. On December 2, the Marlins opted not to tender Álvarez a contract, making him a free agent.

=== Oakland Athletics ===
On December 28, 2015, Álvarez signed a one-year, $4.25 million contract with the Oakland Athletics, with an additional $1.6 million available in incentives. While rehabilitating in the minor leagues, he left a game in July due to shoulder discomfort. After only pitching in 33 innings in the minors, Álvarez underwent shoulder surgery in September.

The Athletics outrighted Álvarez to the Nashville Sounds of the Triple–A Pacific Coast League on October 7, 2016, and he then elected for free agency.

=== Long Island Ducks (2017) ===
On July 14, 2017, Álvarez signed with the Long Island Ducks of the Atlantic League of Professional Baseball, an independent baseball league. In 7 starts for the Ducks, he posted a 2-1 record and 3.09 ERA and 13 strikeouts over 32 innings of work.

=== Philadelphia Phillies (2017) ===
On August 22, 2017, Álvarez signed a minor league contract with the Philadelphia Phillies. He made three starts for Lehigh Valley IronPigs of the Triple–A International League, and the Phillies promoted him to the major leagues on September 11. In 3 starts for the Phillies, he posted a 4.30 ERA with 6 strikeouts across 14 2/3 innings of work. On October 4, Álvarez was removed from the 40–man roster and sent outright to Lehigh, but he rejected the assignment and elected free agency.

=== Tigres de Quintana Roo (2018) ===
On March 14, 2018, Álvarez signed with the Tigres de Quintana Roo of the Mexican League. In 9 starts for the Tigres, he posted a 3–4 record and 4.60 ERA with 31 strikeouts across 58 2/3 innings pitched.

=== Washington Nationals ===
On November 16, 2018, Álvarez signed a minor league contract with the Washington Nationals. In 24 games (4 starts) for the Triple-A Fresno Grizzlies, he compiled a 1–4 record and 5.94 ERA with 37 strikeouts across 53 innings of work. Álvarez was released by the Nationals organization on July 1, 2019.

=== Tigres de Quintana Roo (second stint) ===
On July 20, 2019, Álvarez signed with the Tigres de Quintana Roo of the Mexican League. In 6 starts for Quintana Roo, he compiled a 4–2 record and 3.12 ERA with 23 strikeouts over 34 2/3 innings pitched.

=== Milwaukee Milkmen ===
On August 5, 2020, Álvarez signed with the Milwaukee Milkmen of the American Association. On August 9, Álvarez signed a minor league contract with the Pittsburgh Pirates organization. However, the deal fell apart on August 16. He made 5 starts for the team, recording a 2.90 ERA and 2–1 record with 22 strikeouts in 31.0 innings pitched. Álvarez won the American Association championship with the Milkmen in 2020.

=== Tigres de Quintana Roo (third stint) ===
On September 18, 2020, after the American Association season, Álvarez was returned to the Tigres de Quintana Roo. On May 3, 2021, Álvarez was released by the Tigres.

=== Leones de Yucatán ===
On December 28, 2021, Álvarez signed with the Leones de Yucatán of the Mexican League for the 2022 season. In 2022, he made 17 starts, registering a 7–4 record and 4.43 ERA with 43 strikeouts in 91 1/3 innings pitched. Álvarez won the Mexican League Championship with the Leones in 2022.

In 2023, Álvarez made 15 starts for Quintana Roo and went 6–4 with a 3.68 ERA and 38 strikeouts in 78 1/3 innings.

=== Saraperos de Saltillo ===
On November 28, 2023, Álvarez was traded to the Saraperos de Saltillo of the Mexican League. In 4 starts for Saltillo in 2024, Álvarez struggled to a 7.90 ERA with 5 strikeouts across 13 2/3 innings. He was released by the Saraperos on May 27.

=== Guerreros de Oaxaca ===
On July 22, 2024, Álvarez signed with the Guerreros de Oaxaca of the Mexican League. In 2 starts for the team, he posted a 1–0 record and 1.13 ERA with 1 strikeouts across 8 innings pitched. Álvarez was released by Oaxaca on November 19.

=== Milwaukee Milkmen (second stint; 2026) ===
On July 17, 2026, after a year of inactivity, Álvarez signed with the Milwaukee Milkmen of the American Association. He made six appearances for the Milkmen, struggling to a 12.96 ERA with three strikeouts across 8 1/3 innings pitched. Álvarez was released by Milwaukee on August 18.

== Pitching style ==
Álvarez is a sinkerballer with a 92–95 mph sinker, a 93–96 mph four-seam fastball, an 84–87 mph slider, and an 85–89 mph changeup. He also throws an occasional cutter (87–90). The slider is mostly to right-handed hitters and the changeup mostly against lefties. His pitches all have below-average whiff rates, and his strikeouts per 9 innings rate is only 4.1 as of 27 August 2012. However, his sinker has a ground ball/fly ball ratio of about 4:1.

== See also ==
- List of Major League Baseball players from Venezuela

Preceded by Tim Lincecum	No-hitter pitcher September 29, 2013	Succeeded by Josh Beckett
