= Steve Delabar =

American baseball player (born 1983)

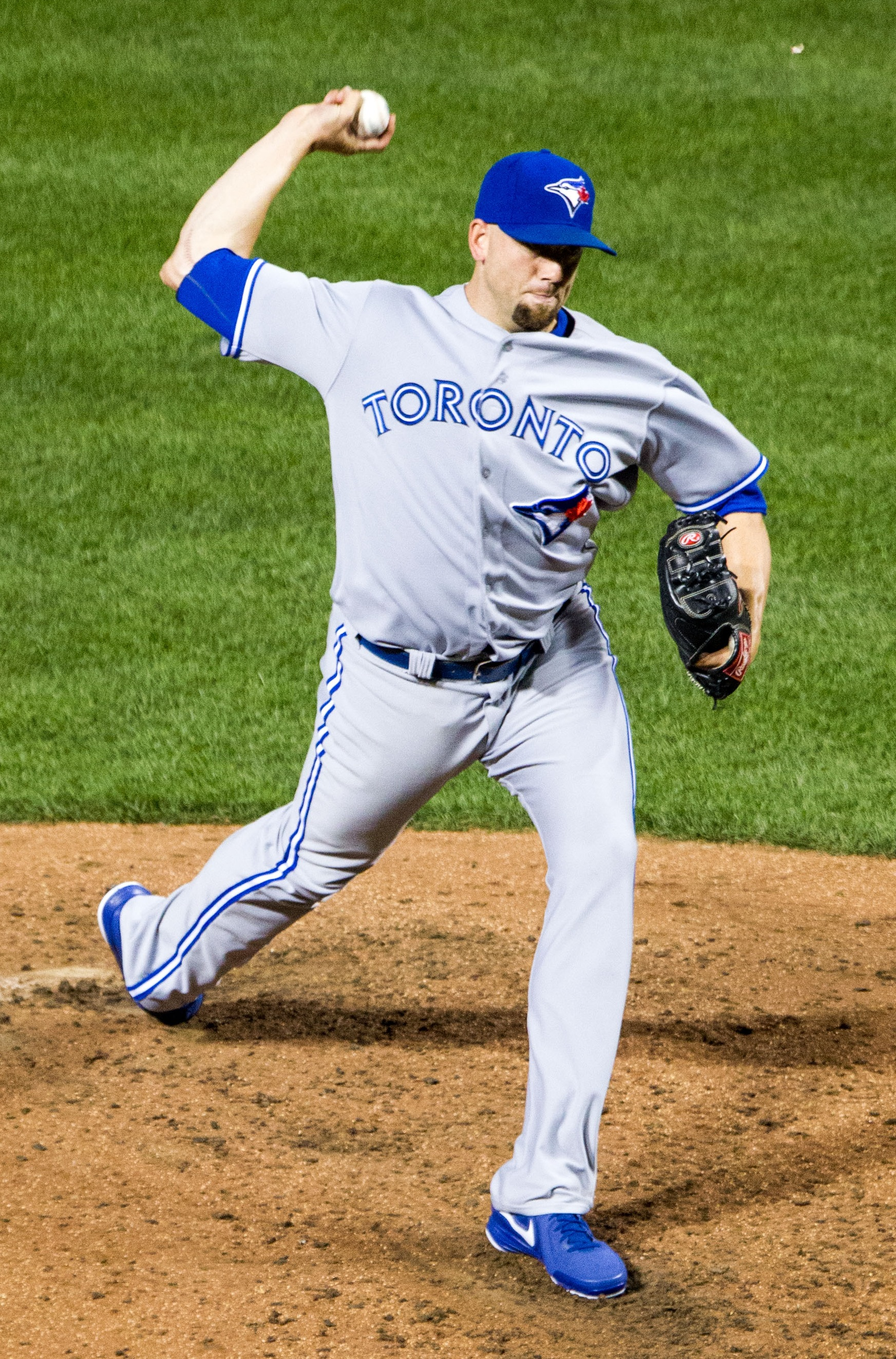
- Delabar with the Toronto Blue Jays
- Pitcher
- Born: July 17, 1983 (age 43); Fort Knox, Kentucky, U.S.
- Batted: Right Threw: Right

Professional debut
- MLB: September 11, 2011, for the Seattle Mariners
- NPB: 2016, for the Hiroshima Toyo Carp

Last appearance
- MLB: May 21, 2016, for the Cincinnati Reds
- NPB: 2016, for the Hiroshima Toyo Carp

MLB statistics
- Win–loss record: 15–9
- Earned run average: 4.07
- Strikeouts: 242

NPB statistics
- Win–loss record: 0–0
- Earned run average: 0.00
- Strikeouts: 4
- Stats at Baseball Reference

Teams
- Seattle Mariners (2011–2012); Toronto Blue Jays (2012–2015); Cincinnati Reds (2016); Hiroshima Toyo Carp (2016)

Career highlights and awards
- All-Star (2013)

Steven Edward Delabar (born July 17, 1983) is an American former professional baseball pitcher. A native of Kentucky, Delabar attended Central Hardin High School and Volunteer State Community College. He was selected late in the 2003 MLB draft by the San Diego Padres and began his minor league career in 2004. He played in the low minor leagues for several seasons until he sustained a severe elbow injury in 2009.

In 2010, Delabar worked as a substitute teacher and then became an assistant high school baseball coach. Delabar helped to implement an arm conditioning program for pitchers at the high school and found that his own pitching velocity improved significantly. After a tryout with the Seattle Mariners in early 2011, Delabar was assigned to the team's Class-A affiliate. He progressed to Advanced-A, Double-A, and Triple-A, then to the major leagues. His MLB debut came late in 2011 at the age of 28. He was traded to the Toronto Blue Jays in 2012, and played with them through the 2015 season.

== Early career ==
Delabar went to Central Hardin High School in Cecilia, Kentucky. where he was drafted by the Anaheim Angels in the 43rd round of the 2002 MLB draft, but elected to go to college. He attended Volunteer State Community College. After one year there, he was drafted in the 29th round, 851st overall, in the 2003 Major League Baseball draft by the San Diego Padres.

== Professional career ==
=== Minor league career ===
Delabar did not play professionally in 2003. He started the 2004 season with the Arizona League Padres, going 3–4 with a 4.37 ERA before earning a promotion to the Single-A Short-Season Eugene Emeralds. He played all of 2005 with Eugene, going 4–6 in 16 starts with a 4.76 ERA. He played 2006 with the Single-A Fort Wayne TinCaps, then the Wizards, earning an 8–9 record with a 3.41 ERA in 27 starts with 118 strikeouts. He started 2007 with Single-A Advanced Lake Elsinore Storm, but was demoted back to Fort Wayne after registering a 5.59 ERA out of the bullpen. He started 2008 with Fort Wayne, but was cut after a 5.27 ERA as a relief pitcher.

On June 7, he signed a deal with the independent Florence Freedom of the Frontier League, where he played four games before signing with the independent Brockton Rox of the Canadian-American Association, going 3–3 in 11 starts with a 3.01 ERA. He played all of 2009 with Brockton, where he had a 3.36 ERA in 12 appearances. His 2009 season ended when he suffered a fractured right elbow. The injury was so serious that a steel plate and nine screws were embedded to stabilize the elbow during the surgery.

He did not play professionally in 2010, working as a substitute teacher in his hometown of Elizabethtown, Kentucky at John Hardin High School. He also played slow pitch softball, where he won the 2010 Louisville Invitational Tournament Miken Homerun Derby. He began working as an assistant baseball coach at the high school. While introducing an arm conditioning program to his high school players, Delabar's own fastball returned to the 92–97 mph range. Delabar signed a minor league deal with the Mariners for 2011. He was assigned to Class-A Advanced High Desert Mavericks before being promoted to the Double-A Jackson Generals and the Triple-A Tacoma Rainiers.

=== Major league career ===
==== Seattle Mariners (2011–2012) ====
The Seattle Mariners called up Delabar on September 6, 2011. He made his MLB debut on September 11 against the Kansas City Royals. He recorded his first major league win on September 14, against the New York Yankees.

==== Toronto Blue Jays (2012–2015) ====
Delabar was traded to the Toronto Blue Jays on July 30, 2012, for outfielder Eric Thames. On August 13, Delabar struck out 4 batters in the 10th inning and recorded the win in a 3–2 victory over the Chicago White Sox. In doing so, Delabar became the first pitcher in major league history to record four strikeouts in an extra inning.

Delabar was named a Final Vote candidate for the 2013 MLB All-Star Game. He posted a 5–1 record with a 1.58 ERA and 57 strikeouts, the most for an American League reliever, in 40 innings over 35 games played prior to the All-Star Game roster announcement. Delabar earned his first career save on July 10. On July 11, it was announced that he had been elected to the All-Star game in the Final Vote contest, receiving 9.6 million votes. Delabar struck out Buster Posey on five pitches in the All-Star Game.

On July 30, while facing the Oakland Athletics, Delabar struck out all three batters in the eighth inning on nine total pitches. He was the 48th major league pitcher to throw an immaculate inning. Delabar also became the fourth pitcher in major league history to both strike out four batters in one inning and throw an immaculate inning, joining Bob Gibson, A.J. Burnett, and Félix Hernández. On August 4, Delabar was placed on the 15-day disabled list with right shoulder inflammation. In 2013, he posted a 5–5 record, 3.22 ERA, and 82 strikeouts in 58 2/3 innings.

After opening the 2014 season with a 4.68 ERA and 16 walks through 25 innings of work, Delabar was optioned to the Triple-A Buffalo Bisons on June 17 to make room for Munenori Kawasaki. Delabar was called back up on June 19, without pitching for Buffalo, after Brett Cecil was placed on the disabled list. Delabar was then optioned back to the Bisons on June 20. When the major league rosters expanded on September 1, he was not among the names announced to be called up. On September 2 the organization announced that he had been sent home for the remainder of the season to rest in preparation for the 2015 season. In 2014, Delabar posted a 3–0 record, 4.91 ERA, 21 strikeouts, and a 1.48 WHIP in 30 appearances (25 2/3 innings) for Toronto.

Despite a strong showing during 2015 spring training, Delabar was optioned to minor league camp on March 26. He was recalled from Buffalo on May 3. He was optioned back to Buffalo on July 25 when Aaron Sanchez was activated from the disabled list. Delabar was recalled in September, though he was not added to the Blue Jays postseason roster. He finished the 2015 campaign with a 2–0 record, 5.22 ERA, and 30 strikeouts in 29 1/3 innings.

On January 15, 2016, Delabar and the Blue Jays avoided salary arbitration by agreeing to a one-year, $835,000 contract. On March 29, the Blue Jays released Delabar.

==== Cincinnati Reds (2016) ====
On April 2, 2016, Delabar signed a minor league deal with the Cincinnati Reds. On May 7, the Reds purchased his contract. On May 17, in a game against the Cleveland Indians, Delabar walked four consecutive batters with the bases loaded, allowing four runs to score. He was designated for assignment by the Reds on May 21 and sent outright to the Triple-A Louisville Bats on May 24. On June 24, Delabar was released by the Reds.

==== Hiroshima Toyo Carp (2016) ====
On June 25, 2016, Delabar signed with the Hiroshima Toyo Carp of Nippon Professional Baseball. He became a free agent following the season.

==== Later career ====
Delabar signed a minor league contract with the Cleveland Indians on January 13, 2017. The deal included an invitation to the Indians' 2017 spring training camp. On April 24, Delabar was suspended for 80 games after testing positive for ostarine. Delabar was released by the Indians on July 5.

On January 4, 2018, Delabar signed a minor league contract with the Texas Rangers with an invitation to spring training. He was released on April 20.

=== Retirement ===
On February 4, 2019, Delabar announced that he would no longer pursue playing opportunities. He said this during an interview on the Outta The Park with Barry Davis podcast.

== Pitching style ==
Delabar threw three pitches: a four-seam fastball at an average of 95 mph, a slider averaging 87 mph that he threw occasionally to right-handed hitters, and a split-finger fastball that averaged 86.5 mph. All three pitches were excellent strikeout pitches, with whiff rates of 11 percent on his fastball, 17.6 percent on his slider, and 21.5 percent his the splitter. The high whiff rates helped Delabar strike out 28.8 percent of batters he faced, above the major league average of 20 percent during his career.

== See also ==
- List of Major League Baseball pitchers who have thrown an immaculate inning
- List of Major League Baseball single-inning strikeout leaders
- List of Toronto Blue Jays team records
