= David Cooper (baseball) =

American baseball player (born 1987)

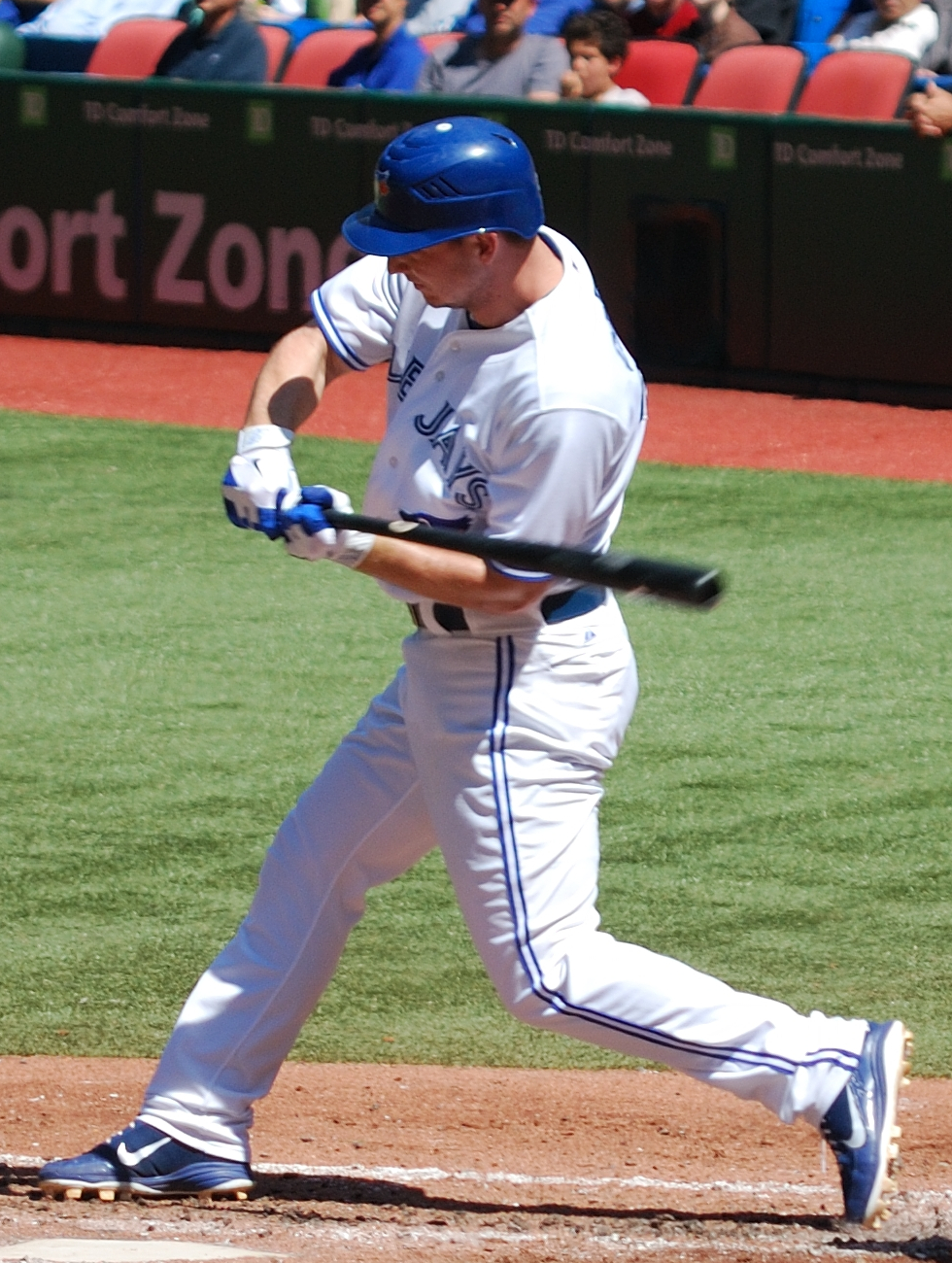
- Cooper with the Toronto Blue Jays
- First baseman
- Born: February 12, 1987 (age 39); Stockton, California, U.S.
- Batted: Left Threw: Left

MLB debut
- April 29, 2011, for the Toronto Blue Jays

Last MLB appearance
- August 22, 2012, for the Toronto Blue Jays

MLB statistics
- Batting average: .270
- Home runs: 6
- Runs batted in: 23
- Stats at Baseball Reference

Teams
- Toronto Blue Jays (2011–2012)

David Fletcher Cooper (born February 12, 1987) is an American former professional baseball first baseman. He previously played in Major League Baseball (MLB) for the Toronto Blue Jays in 2011 and 2012. He is 6 feet tall and weighs 200 pounds.

== Amateur career ==
A native of Stockton, California, Cooper is a graduate of Tokay High School in Lodi, California. He played college baseball for the Cal State Fullerton Titans baseball team before finishing his college career with the California Golden Bears baseball team. In 2006 and 2007, he played collegiate summer baseball with the Brewster Whitecaps of the Cape Cod Baseball League.

In his junior season he hit .359/.449/.682 with 19 home runs and 55 RBIs, attracting the attention of professional scouts. He was drafted with the 17th overall pick of the 2008 Major League Baseball draft by the Toronto Blue Jays. Cooper was one of many first base prospects taken in the first round of the draft after other highly regarded college hitters such as Yonder Alonso, Brett Wallace, and Justin Smoak. In scouting reports prior to the draft, Cooper was regarded as a highly polished college bat who can hit for both average and plus home run power in the majors, but was seen as defensively limited and projected to play at 1B or DH at the major league level.

== Professional career ==
=== Toronto Blue Jays ===
He was playing with the Triple-A Las Vegas 51s in the Blue Jays organization, until he was called up to the Blue Jays on April 29, 2011.

Cooper made his major league debut on April 29, 2011, against the New York Yankees, playing the DH position and batting 7th in the line-up. He walked in his first plate appearance, and struck out in his first official at-bat. He finished the game 0–4. He recorded his first career RBI the next day in a 5-4 loss to the Yankees, and his first career hit on May 1 against Iván Nova. On May 10, Cooper hit his first career home run, a solo shot off of Boston Red Sox reliever Daniel Bard, and followed that up with a game winning sacrifice fly in the bottom of the 10th inning. Cooper was demoted back to Triple-A on May 15, and after almost 4 months with Las Vegas, he was included in the Blue Jays' September call-ups and re-debuted on September 8.

Cooper did not make the Blue Jays roster out of spring training and began the 2012 season at Las Vegas. Cooper was hitting .298 with 6 HR and 34 RBI in 42 games when on May 25, he was promoted to Toronto after Ben Francisco was placed on the 15-day DL.

Cooper was optioned to the Triple-A Las Vegas 51s on June 24, 2012. He was recalled on July 30 to replace Adam Lind, who was placed on the disabled list due to a mid-back strain, On February 17, 2013, the Blue Jays announced that Cooper will miss all of spring training due to a serious back injury, and is seeking treatment for a disc issue. Cooper was released by the Blue Jays on March 13, 2013.

Cooper underwent back surgery in April 2013 and had a titanium plate and two titanium screws placed in his T7 and T8 vertebrae to reinforce his spine.

=== Cleveland Indians ===
On August 13, 2013, Cooper signed a minor league contract with the Cleveland Indians. It included an opt out clause for him to leave the organization if he had not made the major league club by late August. He played seven games with the Columbus Clippers before being granted free agency on August 31.

Cooper signed a new major league deal with the Indians on December 9, 2013. He was designated for assignment on March 2, 2014 when Justin Sellers was acquired from the Los Angeles Dodgers, and was outrighted to Triple-A on March 4.

=== Lancaster Barnstormers ===
On March 25, 2015, Cooper signed with the Lancaster Barnstormers of the Atlantic League of Professional Baseball.

=== New York Mets ===
On May 14, 2015, Cooper signed a minor league contract with the New York Mets, and was assigned to the Double-A Binghamton Mets. Cooper was released on May 31, and reportedly planned to retire.
