= 2013 Toronto Blue Jays season =

2013 Toronto Blue Jays
- League: American League
- Division: East
- Ballpark: Rogers Centre
- City: Toronto, Ontario
- Record: 74–88 (.457)
- Divisional place: 5th
- Owners: Rogers; Paul Beeston (CEO)
- General managers: Alex Anthopoulos
- Managers: John Gibbons
- Television: Sportsnet; Sportsnet One (Buck Martinez, Pat Tabler, Jack Morris, Matt Devlin)
- Radio: Blue Jays Radio Network; Sportsnet 590 the FAN (Jerry Howarth, Jack Morris, Mike Wilner, Dirk Hayhurst)

The 2013 Toronto Blue Jays season was the 37th season of Major League Baseball's Toronto Blue Jays franchise, and the 24th full season of play (25th overall) at the Rogers Centre. Despite high expectations heading into the season, the Blue Jays finished 74–88, in last place in the American League East.

== Offseason ==
=== Coaching staff ===
On October 21, 2012, the Blue Jays officially announced that they had released their manager John Farrell from his contract in the same agreement that sent David Carpenter to the Red Sox in exchange for Mike Avilés.

On November 20, 2012, the Blue Jays announced that former manager John Gibbons would once again manage the Blue Jays, in 2013.

On November 26, 2012, the Blue Jays announced most of the coaching staff that will be working under John Gibbons. Five of its six coaching positions were filled. DeMarlo Hale (bench coach), Chad Mottola (hitting coach), Dwayne Murphy (first base coach) Luis Rivera (third base coach) and Pete Walker (pitching coach) were all signed on. The following month, Pat Hentgen was hired as the bullpen coach.

=== Departing players ===
After the end of the 2012 season, the Blue Jays lost a number of players including Carlos Villanueva, Kelly Johnson, Jason Frasor and Brandon Lyon. They also declined the option for Rajai Davis, but instead gave him a $2.5 million one-year contract.

=== Player signings ===
The Blue Jays started their offseason by signing free agent Maicer Izturis to a three-year $9 million deal with an option year, on November 8. On November 16, they signed free agent Melky Cabrera to a two-year $16 million deal.

=== Trades ===
On the same day as the Izturis signing, the Blue Jays acquired RHP Jeremy Jeffress from the Kansas City Royals for cash considerations. They then completed a trade with the Cleveland Indians in which they acquired RHP Esmil Rogers in exchange for the newly acquired Mike Avilés and Yan Gomes.

On November 14, Toronto Blue Jays and Miami Marlins completed a blockbuster trade. Toronto acquired pitcher Josh Johnson, pitcher Mark Buehrle, shortstop José Reyes, utility man Emilio Bonifacio, and catcher John Buck. In return, Toronto sent pitcher Henderson Álvarez, pitching prospect Justin Nicolino, outfield prospect Jake Marisnick, infielder Yunel Escobar, infielder Adeiny Hechavarria, catcher Jeff Mathis and pitching prospect Anthony DeSclafani. Toronto also received $8+ million in cash from the Marlins. The mega-trade is described as a fire sale after the Marlins took on huge salaries a year prior, and dumped all of their high-salaried players.

On December 17, 2012, the Blue Jays acquired the 2012 National League Cy Young Award winner R. A. Dickey in a trade with the New York Mets that sent prospects Travis D'Arnaud, Noah Syndergaard, minor leaguer Wuilmer Becerra and catcher John Buck to New York. Toronto also received catcher Josh Thole and minor league catcher Mike Nickeas in the trade. As part of the transaction, the Blue Jays signed Dickey to an extension worth a total of $29 million over 3 years with a $12 million 4th year option.

=== Opening Day ===
The Blue Jays began their 2013 season on April 2, with a home game against the Cleveland Indians. On February 5, 2013, at the annual state of the franchise address, manager John Gibbons named reigning National League Cy Young Award winner R. A. Dickey as the opening day starter for the Blue Jays.

== Standings ==
=== American League East ===
AL East
Team	W	L	Pct.	GB	Home	Road
Boston Red Sox	97	65	.599	—	53‍–‍28	44‍–‍37
Tampa Bay Rays	92	71	.564	5½	51‍–‍30	41‍–‍41
New York Yankees	85	77	.525	12	46‍–‍35	39‍–‍42
Baltimore Orioles	85	77	.525	12	46‍–‍35	39‍–‍42
Toronto Blue Jays	74	88	.457	23	40‍–‍41	34‍–‍47

=== American League Wild Card ===
Division winners
Team	W	L	Pct.
Boston Red Sox	97	65	.599
Oakland Athletics	96	66	.593
Detroit Tigers	93	69	.574

Wild Card teams (Top 2 teams qualify for postseason)
Team	W	L	Pct.	GB
Cleveland Indians	92	70	.568	+½
Tampa Bay Rays	92	71	.564	—
Texas Rangers	91	72	.558	1
Kansas City Royals	86	76	.531	5½
New York Yankees	85	77	.525	6½
Baltimore Orioles	85	77	.525	6½
Los Angeles Angels of Anaheim	78	84	.481	13½
Toronto Blue Jays	74	88	.457	17½
Seattle Mariners	71	91	.438	20½
Minnesota Twins	66	96	.407	25½
Chicago White Sox	63	99	.389	28½
Houston Astros	51	111	.315	40½

== Records vs opponents ==
	Record			Games Left		
Opponent	Home	Road	Total	Home	Road	Total
AL East
Baltimore Orioles	6–4	3–6	9–10	–	–	–
Boston Red Sox	4–5	4–6	8–11	–	–	–
New York Yankees	5–4	0–10	5–14	–	–	–
Tampa Bay Rays	4–5	4–6	8–11	–	–	–
Totals	19–18	11–28	30–46	–	–	–
AL Central
Chicago White Sox	2–2	1–2	3–4	–	–	–
Cleveland Indians	1–2	1–2	2–4	–	–	–
Detroit Tigers	1–3	1–2	2–5	–	–	–
Kansas City Royals	2–1	2–1	4–2	–	–	–
Minnesota Twins	2–1	3–0	5–1	–	–	–
Totals	8–9	8–7	16–16	–	–	–
AL West
Houston Astros	3–1	1–2	4–3	–	–	–
Los Angeles Angels	0–3	1–3	1–6	–	–	–
Oakland Athletics	1–3	2–1	3–4	–	–	–
Seattle Mariners	1–2	2–1	3–3	–	–	–
Texas Rangers	2–1	4–0	6–1	–	–	–
Totals	7–10	10–7	17–17	–	–	–
National League
Arizona Diamondbacks	–	2–1	2–1	–	–	–
Atlanta Braves	1–1	1–1	2–2	–	–	–
Colorado Rockies	3–0	–	3–0	–	–	–
Los Angeles Dodgers	0–3	–	0–3	–	–	–
San Diego Padres	–	1–2	1–2	–	–	–
San Francisco Giants	2–0	1–1	3–1	–	–	–
Totals	6–4	5–5	11–9	–	–	–
Grand Totals	40–41	34–46	74–88	–	–	–

Month	Games	Won	Lost	Pct.
April	27	10	17	.370
May	28	13	15	.464
June	26	17	9	.654
July	26	10	16	.385
August	29	12	17	.414
September	26	12	14	.462
Totals	162	74	88	.457

2013 American League record Source: MLB Standings Grid – 2013
Team	BAL	BOS	CWS	CLE	DET	HOU	KC	LAA	MIN	NYY	OAK	SEA	TB	TEX	TOR	NL
Baltimore	—	11–8	4–3	3–4	4–2	4–2	3–4	5–2	3–3	9–10	5–2	2–4	6–13	5–2	10–9	11–9
Boston	8–11	—	4–2	6–1	3–4	6–1	2–5	3–3	4–3	13–6	3–3	6–1	12–7	2–4	11–8	14–6
Chicago	3–4	2–4	—	2–17	7–12	3–4	9–10	3–4	8–11	3–3	2–5	3–3	2–5	4–2	4–3	8–12
Cleveland	4–3	1–6	17–2	—	4–15	6–1	10–9	4–2	13–6	1–6	5–2	5–2	2–4	5–1	4–2	11–9
Detroit	2–4	4–3	12–7	15–4	—	6–1	9–10	0–6	11–8	3–3	3–4	5–2	3–3	3–4	5–2	12–8
Houston	2–4	1–6	4–3	1–6	1–6	—	2–4	10–9	1–5	1–5	4–15	9–10	2–5	2–17	3–4	8–12
Kansas City	4–3	5–2	10–9	9–10	10–9	4–2	—	2–5	15–4	2–5	1–5	4–3	6–1	3–3	2–4	9–11
Los Angeles	2–5	3–3	4–3	2–4	6–0	9–10	5–2	—	1–5	3–4	8–11	11–8	4–3	4–15	6–1	10–10
Minnesota	3–3	3–4	11–8	6–13	8–11	5–1	4–15	5–1	—	2–5	1–6	4–3	1–6	4–3	1–5	8–12
New York	10–9	6–13	3–3	6–1	3–3	5–1	5–2	4–3	5–2	—	1–5	4–3	7–12	3–4	14–5	9–11
Oakland	2–5	3–3	5–2	2–5	4–3	15–4	5–1	11–8	6–1	5–1	—	8–11	3–3	10–9	4–3	13–7
Seattle	4–2	1–6	3–3	2–5	2–5	10–9	3–4	8–11	3–4	3–4	11–8	—	3–3	7–12	3–3	8–12
Tampa Bay	13–6	7–12	5–2	4–2	3–3	5–2	1–6	3–4	6–1	12–7	3–3	3–3	—	4–4	11–8	12–8
Texas	2–5	4–2	2–4	1–5	4–3	17–2	3–3	15–4	3–4	4–3	9–10	12–7	4–4	—	1–6	10–10
Toronto	9–10	8–11	3–4	2–4	2–5	4–3	4–2	1–6	5–1	5–14	3–4	3–3	8–11	6–1	—	11–9

== 2013 draft ==
The 2013 Major League Baseball draft was held on June 6–8.

Round	Pick	Player	Position	College/School	Nationality	Signed
1	10	Phillip Bickford*	RHP	Oaks Christian High School (CA)	(United States)	Unsigned
2	47	Clinton Hollon	RHP	Woodford County High School (KY)	(United States)	2013–07–06
3	83	Patrick Murphy	RHP	Hamilton High School (AZ)	(United States)	2013–06–13
4	115	Evan Smith	LHP	Mary G. Montgomery High School (AL)	(United States)	2013–06–13
5	145	Daniel Lietz	LHP	Heartland CC	(United States)	2013–06–13
6	175	Matt Boyd	LHP	Oregon State	(United States)	2013–07–11
7	205	Conner Greene	RHP	Santa Monica High School (CA)	(United States)	2013–06–13
8	235	Kendall Graveman	RHP	Mississippi State	(United States)	2013–07–09
9	265	Chad Girodo	LHP	Mississippi State	(United States)	2013–07–09
10	295	Garrett Custons	C	Air Force	(United States)	2013–06–13

- – Bickford did not sign with the Blue Jays by the deadline of July 12. Toronto received the 11th overall draft selection as compensation in the 2014 Major League Baseball draft, with which they drafted Max Pentecost.

== Roster ==
2013 Toronto Blue Jays
Roster
Pitchers: 56 Mark Buehrle; 54 Dave Bush; 27 Brett Cecil; 50 Steve Delabar; 43 R. A. Dickey; 4 Kyle Drabek; 52 Justin Germano; 35 Édgar González; 48 J. A. Happ; 44 Casey Janssen; 33 Jeremy Jeffress; 64 Chad Jenkins; 55 Josh Johnson; 37 Aaron Laffey; 49 Brad Lincoln; 62 Aaron Loup; 29 Dustin McGowan; 23 Brandon Morrow; 35 Sean Nolin; 38 Darren Oliver; 34 Ramón Ortiz; 57 Juan Pérez; 47 Luis Pérez; 58 Todd Redmond; 32 Esmil Rogers; 24 Ricky Romero; 21 Sergio Santos; 37 Mickey Storey; 45 Neil Wagner; 67 Chien-Ming Wang; 51 Thad Weber	Catchers: 9 J. P. Arencibia; 22 Henry Blanco; 15 Mike Nickeas; 30 Josh Thole; Infielders: 1 Emilio Bonifacio; 16 Mark DeRosa; 10 Edwin Encarnación; 17 Ryan Goins; 3 Maicer Izturis; 66 Munenori Kawasaki; 18 Ryan Langerhans; 31 Andy LaRoche; 13 Brett Lawrie; 26 Adam Lind; 7 José Reyes	Outfielders: 19 José Bautista; 53 Melky Cabrera; 11 Rajai Davis; 8 Anthony Gose; 22 Kevin Pillar; 28 Colby Rasmus; 14 Moisés Sierra	Manager: 5 John Gibbons; Coaches: 61 Alex Andreopoulos (bullpen catcher); 20 DeMarlo Hale (bench); 41 Pat Hentgen (bullpen); 39 Chad Mottola (hitting); 25 Dwayne Murphy (first base); 2 Luis Rivera (third base); 40 Pete Walker (pitching)

== Player stats ==
=== Batting ===
Note: G = Games played; AB = At bats; R = Runs; H = Hits; 2B = Doubles; 3B = Triples; HR = Home runs; RBI = Runs batted in; SB = Stolen bases; BB = Walks; AVG = Batting average; SLG = Slugging average

Player	G	AB	R	H	2B	3B	HR	RBI	SB	BB	AVG	SLG
Edwin Encarnación	142	530	90	144	29	1	36	104	7	82	.272	.534
J.P. Arencibia	138	474	45	92	18	0	21	55	0	18	.194	.365
Adam Lind	143	465	67	134	26	1	23	67	1	51	.288	.497
José Bautista	118	452	82	117	24	0	28	73	7	69	.259	.498
Colby Rasmus	118	417	57	115	26	1	22	66	0	37	.276	.501
Brett Lawrie	107	401	41	102	18	3	11	46	9	30	.254	.397
José Reyes	93	382	58	113	20	0	10	37	15	34	.296	.427
Maicer Izturis	107	365	33	86	12	0	5	32	1	27	.236	.310
Melky Cabrera	88	344	39	96	15	2	3	30	2	23	.279	.360
Rajai Davis	108	331	49	86	16	2	6	24	45	21	.260	.375
Emilio Bonifácio	94	262	33	57	16	1	3	20	12	13	.218	.321
Munenori Kawasaki	96	240	27	55	6	5	1	24	7	32	.229	.308
Mark DeRosa	88	204	23	48	12	1	7	36	0	28	.235	.407
Anthony Gose	52	147	15	38	6	5	2	12	4	5	.259	.408
Josh Thole	45	120	11	21	3	1	1	8	0	12	.175	.242
Ryan Goins	34	119	11	30	5	0	2	8	0	2	.252	.345
Moisés Sierra	35	107	11	31	13	1	1	13	1	14	.290	.458
Kevin Pillar	36	102	11	21	4	0	3	13	0	4	.206	.333
Henry Blanco	15	38	3	7	3	0	0	0	0	4	.184	.263
Ryan Langerhans	4	11	3	3	0	0	0	0	1	2	.273	.273
Andy LaRoche	1	4	0	0	0	0	0	0	0	0	.000	.000
Mike Nickeas	1	0	0	0	0	0	0	0	0	0	.---	.---
Pitcher totals	162	22	3	2	1	0	0	1	0	2	.091	.136
Team totals	162	5537	712	1398	273	24	185	669	112	510	.252	.411

=== Pitching ===
Note: W = Wins; L = Losses; ERA = Earned run average; G = Games pitched; GS = Games started; SV = Saves; IP = Innings pitched; H = Hits allowed; R = Runs allowed; ER = Earned runs allowed; BB = Walks allowed; SO = Strikeouts

Player	W	L	ERA	G	GS	SV	IP	H	R	ER	BB	SO
R.A. Dickey	14	13	4.21	34	34	0	224.2	207	113	105	71	177
Mark Buehrle	12	10	4.15	33	30	0	203.2	223	100	94	51	139
Esmil Rogers	5	9	4.77	44	20	0	137.2	152	76	73	44	96
J.A. Happ	5	7	4.56	18	18	0	92.2	91	53	47	45	77
Josh Johnson	2	8	6.20	16	16	0	81.1	105	64	56	30	83
Todd Redmond	4	3	4.32	17	14	0	77.0	70	38	37	23	76
Aaron Loup	4	6	2.47	64	0	2	69.1	66	23	19	13	53
Brett Cecil	5	1	2.82	60	0	1	60.2	44	20	19	23	70
Steve Delabar	5	5	3.22	55	0	1	58.2	50	25	21	29	82
Brandon Morrow	2	3	5.63	10	10	0	54.1	63	39	34	18	42
Casey Janssen	4	1	2.56	56	0	34	52.2	39	17	15	13	50
Darren Oliver	3	4	3.86	50	0	0	49.0	47	24	21	15	40
Neil Wagner	2	4	3.79	36	0	0	38.0	39	17	16	13	33
Chad Jenkins	1	0	2.70	10	3	0	33.1	31	13	10	6	15
Juan Pérez	1	2	3.69	19	0	0	31.2	23	17	13	15	33
Brad Lincoln	1	2	3.98	22	0	0	31.2	28	17	14	22	25
Chien-Ming Wang	1	2	7.67	6	6	0	27.0	40	24	23	9	14
Sergio Santos	1	1	1.75	29	0	1	25.2	11	5	5	4	28
Dustin McGowan	0	0	2.45	25	0	0	25.2	19	11	7	12	26
Ramón Ortiz	1	2	6.04	7	4	0	25.1	34	17	17	11	8
Jeremy Jeffress	1	0	0.87	10	0	0	10.1	8	1	1	5	12
Édgar González	0	0	7.88	3	0	0	8.0	9	7	7	5	3
Ricky Romero	0	2	11.05	4	2	0	7.1	11	9	9	8	5
Thad Weber	0	1	3.00	5	0	0	6.0	7	3	2	3	4
Luis Pérez	0	1	5.40	6	0	0	5.0	4	3	3	2	6
Mickey Storey	0	0	6.75	3	0	0	4.0	6	3	3	1	6
Dave Bush	0	0	15.00	1	0	0	3.0	5	5	5	1	1
Aaron Laffey	0	0	6.75	3	0	0	2.2	2	2	2	5	0
Kyle Drabek	0	0	7.71	3	0	0	2.1	4	2	2	2	3
Justin Germano	0	0	9.00	1	0	0	2.0	6	2	2	0	1
Sean Nolin	0	1	40.50	1	1	0	1.1	7	6	6	1	0
Team totals	74	88	4.25	162	162	39	1452.0	1451	756	685	500	1208

== Game log ==
Legend
Blue Jays Win	Blue Jays Loss	Game postponed

2013 Game Log
April 10–17 (Home 6–8, Road 4–9)

#	Date	Opponent	Score	Win	Loss	Save	Attendance	Record	GB
1	April 2	Indians	1–4	Masterson (1–0)	Dickey (0–1)	Perez (1)	48,847	0–1	1
2	April 3	Indians	2–3 (11)	Albers (1–0)	Santos (0–1)	Smith (1)	24,619	0–2	2
3	April 4	Indians	10–8	Delabar (1–0)	Myers (0–1)	Janssen (1)	19,515	1–2	1
4	April 5	Red Sox	4–6	Tazawa (1–0)	Rogers (0–1)	Hanrahan (2)	45,328	1–3	2
5	April 6	Red Sox	5–0	Happ (1–0)	Lackey (0–1)		45,797	2–3	1
6	April 7	Red Sox	0–13	Lester (2–0)	Dickey (0–2)		41,186	2–4	2
7	April 9	@ Tigers	3–7	Sánchez (1–0)	Morrow (0–1)		28,979	2–5	3
8	April 10	@ Tigers	8–6	Loup (1–0)	Villarreal (0–1)	Janssen (2)	29,631	3–5	2
9	April 11	@ Tigers	1–11	Fister (2–0)	Johnson (0–1)		28,781	3–6	2
10	April 12	@ Royals	8–4	Happ (2–0)	Mendoza (0–1)	Loup (1)	13,049	4–6	1½
11	April 13	@ Royals	3–2	Dickey (1–2)	Shields (1–2)	Janssen (3)	21,960	5–6	1½
12	April 14	@ Royals	2–3	Herrera (1–0)	Oliver (0–1)		29,057	5–7	2½
13	April 15	White Sox	4–3	Buehrle (1–0)	Floyd (0–3)	Janssen (4)	15,755	6–7	2½
14	April 16	White Sox	3–4	Lindstrom (1–0)	Delabar (1–1)	Reed (5)	16,131	6–8	3½
15	April 17	White Sox	0–7	Quintana (1–0)	Happ (2–1)		15,684	6–9	4½
16	April 18	White Sox	3–1	Dickey (2–2)	Sale (1–2)	Janssen (5)	18,015	7–9	4½
17	April 19	Yankees	4–9	Pettitte (3–0)	Morrow (0–2)		40,028	7–10	5
18	April 20	Yankees	3–5 (11)	Kelley (1–0)	Loup (1–1)	Rivera (5)	46,095	7–11	6
19	April 21	Yankees	8–4	Cecil (1–0)	Logan (0–1)		45,575	8–11	4½
20	April 22	@ Orioles	1–2	Johnson (1–1)	Loup (1–2)		11,168	8–12	5½
21	April 23	@ Orioles	3–4	González (2–1)	Dickey (2–3)	Johnson (8)	13,272	8–13	5½
22	April 24	@ Orioles	6–5 (11)	Rogers (1–1)	Johnson (1–2)	Janssen (6)	14,981	9–13	5½
23	April 25	@ Yankees	3–5	Kuroda (3–1)	Buehrle (1–1)	Rivera (7)	31,445	9–14	6½
24	April 26	@ Yankees	4–6	Phelps (1–1)	Lincoln (0–1)	Rivera (8)	36,151	9–15	7½
25	April 27	@ Yankees	4–5	Sabathia (4–2)	Rogers (1–2)	Chamberlain (1)	40,258	9–16	8½
26	April 28	@ Yankees	2–3	Logan (1–1)	Dickey (2–4)	Rivera (9)	36,872	9–17	9½
27	April 30	Red Sox	9–7	Delabar (2–1)	Tazawa (2–1)	Janssen (7)	22,915	10–17	8½

May 13–15 (Home 8–8, Road 5–7)

#	Date	Opponent	Score	Win	Loss	Save	Attendance	Record	GB
28	May 1	Red Sox	1–10	Buchholz (6–0)	Buehrle (1–2)		21,094	10–18	9½
29	May 2	Red Sox	1–3	Dempster (2–2)	Happ (2–2)	Hanrahan (4)	25,851	10–19	10½
30	May 3	Mariners	0–4	Hernández (4–2)	Romero (0–1)		23,779	10–20	10½
31	May 4	Mariners	1–8	Iwakuma (3–1)	Dickey (2–5)		35,754	10–21	10½
32	May 5	Mariners	10–2	Morrow (1–2)	Saunders (2–4)		22,937	11–21	9½
33	May 6	@ Rays	8–7	Oliver (1–1)	Rodney (1–1)	Janssen (8)	9,952	12–21	9½
34	May 7	@ Rays	6–4	Delabar (3–1)	Peralta (0–2)	Janssen (9)	10,273	13–21	8½
35	May 8	@ Rays	4–10	Moore (6–0)	Romero (0–2)		11,075	13–22	8½
36	May 9	@ Rays	4–5 (10)	Farnsworth (2–0)	Loup (1–3)		11,979	13–23	8½
37	May 10	@ Red Sox	0–5	Lester (5–0)	Ortiz (0–1)		33,606	13–24	9½
38	May 11	@ Red Sox	3–2	Oliver (2–1)	Tazawa (2–2)	Janssen (10)	36,543	14–24	9½
39	May 12	@ Red Sox	12–4	Jenkins (1–0)	Dempster (2–4)		35,532	15–24	9½
40	May 14	Giants	10–6	Dickey (3–5)	Zito (3–2)		31,753	16–24	9½
41	May 15	Giants	11–3	Ortiz (1–1)	Vogelsong (1–4)		32,863	17–24	8½
42	May 17	@ Yankees	0–5	Kuroda (6–2)	Buehrle (1–3)		40,008	17–25	9
43	May 18	@ Yankees	2–7	Phelps (2–2)	Morrow (1–3)		45,577	17–26	10
—	May 19	@ Yankees	Postponed (rain) Rescheduled for August 20						
44	May 20	Rays	7–5	Dickey (4–5)	Lueke (0–1)		29,885	18–26	10
45	May 21	Rays	3–4	Cobb (5–2)	Ortiz (1–2)	Rodney (9)	15,802	18–27	10
46	May 22	Rays	4–3 (10)	Loup (2–3)	Ramos (1–1)		18,771	19–27	9
47	May 23	Orioles	12–6	Morrow (2–3)	Gausman (0–1)		21,466	20–27	8½
48	May 24	Orioles	6–10	Tillman (4–2)	Nolan (0–1)		25,104	20–28	9½
49	May 25	Orioles	5–6	García (1–2)	Dickey (4–6)	Johnson (15)	35,915	20–29	10½
50	May 26	Orioles	6–5	Delabar (4–1)	Johnson (2–5)		28,502	21–29	9½
51	May 27	Braves	9–3	Buehrle (2–3)	Hudson (4–4)		22,808	22–29	9½
52	May 28	Braves	6–7 (10)	Gearrin (2–1)	Weber (0–1)	Kimbrel (16)	45,224	22–30	9½
53	May 29	@ Braves	3–0	Pérez (1–0)	Medlen (1–6)	Janssen (11)	22,489	23–30	8½
54	May 30	@ Braves	3–11	Minor (7–2)	Dickey (4–7)		29,967	23–31	9½
55	May 31	@ Padres	3–4 (17)	Richard (1–5)	Redmond (0–1)		24,219	23–32	9½

June 17–9 (Home 8–1, Road 9–8)

#	Date	Opponent	Score	Win	Loss.	Save	Attendance	Record	GB
56	June 1	@ Padres	3–4	Erlin (1–0)	Buehrle (2–4)	Gregerson (1)	40,403	23–33	10½
57	June 2	@ Padres	7–4 (11)	Janssen (1–0)	Boxberger (0–1)	Loup (2)	20,384	24–33	10½
58	June 4	@ Giants	1–2	Lincecum (4–5)	Johnson (0–2)	Romo (16)	41,981	24–34	11½
59	June 5	@ Giants	4–0	Dickey (5–7)	Zito (4–4)	Janssen (12)	41,559	25–34	10½
60	June 7	Rangers	6–1	Wagner (1–0)	Tepesch (3–5)		36,010	26–34	10½
61	June 8	Rangers	4–3 (18)	Loup (3–3)	Wolf (1–1)		44,079	27–34	10
62	June 9	Rangers	4–6	Cotts (2–0)	Wagner (1–1)	Nathan (19)	42,722	27–35	11
63	June 10	@ White Sox	6–10	Jones (2–4)	Dickey (5–8)		18,126	27–36	12
64	June 11	@ White Sox	7–5 (10)	Cecil (2–0)	Troncoso (0–1)	Janssen (13)	20,700	28–36	11
—	June 12	@ White Sox	Postponed (rain) Rescheduled for September 23						
65	June 13	@ Rangers	3–1	Rogers (2–2)	Cotts (2–1)	Janssen (14)	32,013	29–36	10½
66	June 14	@ Rangers	8–0	Buehrle (3–4)	Grimm (5–5)		37,203	30–36	9½
67	June 15	@ Rangers	6–1	Dickey (6–8)	Lindblom (0–2)		33,121	31–36	9½
68	June 16	@ Rangers	7–2	Wang (1–0)	Holland (5–4)		44,052	32–36	8½
69	June 17	Rockies	2–0	Cecil (3–0)	Belisle (4–4)	Janssen (15)	20,946	33–36	8
70	June 18	Rockies	8–3	Rogers (3–2)	Francis (2–5)		22,852	34–36	8½
71	June 19	Rockies	5–2	Buehrle (4–4)	Nicasio (4–3)	Janssen (16)	27,235	35–36	7½
72	June 21	Orioles	7–6	Janssen (2–0)	Matusz (2–1)		35,472	36–36	7
73	June 22	Orioles	4–2	Oliver (3–1)	González (5–3)	Janssen (17)	43,261	37–36	6
74	June 23	Orioles	13–5	Johnson (1–2)	García (3–5)		45,214	38–36	5
75	June 24	@ Rays	1–4	Hellickson (6–3)	Rogers (3–3)	Rodney (16)	11,407	38–37	5½
76	June 25	@ Rays	1–5	Moore (10–3)	Buehrle (4–5)		12,041	38–38	6½
77	June 26	@ Rays	3–0	Dickey (7–8)	Hernández (4–9)		21,502	39–38	6½
78	June 27	@ Red Sox	4–7	Lester (8–4)	Wang (1–1)	Uehara (3)	34,750	39–39	7½
79	June 28	@ Red Sox	5–7	Miller (1–2)	Wagner (1–2)	Uehara (4)	36,383	39–40	8½
80	June 29	@ Red Sox	6–2	Delabar (5–1)	Tazawa (4–3)		37,437	40–40	7½
81	June 30	@ Red Sox	4–5	Uehara (1–0)	Pérez (1–1)		37,425	40–41	8½

July 10–16 (Home 6–11, Road 4–5)

#	Date	Opponent	Score	Win	Loss	Save	Attendance	Record	GB
82	July 1	Tigers	8–3	Dickey (8–8)	Álvarez (1–2)		45,766	41–41	8
83	July 2	Tigers	6–7	Alburquerque (1–1)	Wagner (1–3)	Benoit (6)	27,189	41–42	9
84	July 3	Tigers	2–6	Scherzer (13–0)	Johnson (1–3)		28,958	41–43	10
85	July 4	Tigers	1–11	Verlander (9–5)	Rogers (3–4)		35,978	41–44	11
86	July 5	Twins	4–0	Buehrle (5–5)	Correia (6–6)		25,672	42–44	11
87	July 6	Twins	0–6	Pelfrey (4–6)	Dickey (8–9)		37,034	42–45	11
88	July 7	Twins	11–5	Redmond (1–1)	Diamond (5–8)		43,795	43–45	10
89	July 9	@ Indians	0–3	Jiménez (7–4)	Johnson (1–4)	Perez (10)	13,640	43–46	10½
90	July 10	@ Indians	5–4	Wagner (2–3)	Hill (0–2)	Delabar (1)	14,134	44–46	10½
91	July 11	@ Indians	2–4	Salazar (1–0)	Dickey (8–10)	Perez (11)	20,641	44–47	11½
92	July 12	@ Orioles	5–8	Tillman (11–3)	Buehrle (5–6)	Johnson (32)	42,660	44–48	12½
93	July 13	@ Orioles	7–3	Loup (4–3)	Hammel (7–6)	Janssen (18)	46,150	45–48	11½
94	July 14	@ Orioles	4–7	Feldman (1–1)	Johnson (1–5)	Johnson (33)	34,748	45–49	11½
95	July 19	Rays	5–8	Price (4–5)	Cecil (3–1)		33,266	45–50	12½
96	July 20	Rays	3–4	Hellickson (9–3)	Buehrle (5–7)	Rodney (23)	42,639	45–51	12½
97	July 21	Rays	3–4	Archer (5–3)	Dickey (8–11)	Rodney (24)	41,247	45–52	13½
98	July 22	Dodgers	5–14	Ryu (8–3)	Johnson (1–6)		34,515	45–53	13½
99	July 23	Dodgers	9–10	League (4–3)	Oliver (3–2)	Jansen (12)	32,158	45–54	14½
100	July 24	Dodgers	3–8 (10)	League (5–3)	Pérez (1–2)		35,368	45–55	14½
101	July 25	Astros	4–0	Buehrle (6–7)	Bédard (3–8)		24,188	46–55	14
102	July 26	Astros	12–6	Cecil (4–1)	Clemens (4–4)		24,088	47–55	13½
103	July 27	Astros	6–8	Keuchel (5–5)	Johnson (1–7)	Veras (19)	34,137	47–56	14½
104	July 28	Astros	2–1	Janssen (3–0)	Cisnero (2–2)		31,634	48–56	14
105	July 29	@ Athletics	4–9	Griffin (10–7)	Rogers (3–5)		13,309	48–57	14½
106	July 30	@ Athletics	5–0	Buehrle (7–7)	Straily (6–5)		17,479	49–57	14½
107	July 31	@ Athletics	5–2 (10)	Janssen (4–0)	Chavez (2–3)	Cecil (1)	23,638	50–57	14

August 12–17 (Home 7–5, Road 5–12)

#	Date	Opponent	Score	Win	Loss	Save	Attendance	Record	GB
108	August 1	@ Angels	2–8	Richards (3–4)	Johnson (1–8)		37,179	50–58	15
109	August 2	@ Angels	5–7	De La Rosa (5–1)	Delabar (5–2)	Frieri (26)	38,884	50–59	15
110	August 3	@ Angels	3–7	Weaver (6–5)	Rogers (3–6)		41,253	50–60	16
111	August 4	@ Angels	6–5	Cecil (5–1)	Frieri (0–4)	Janssen (19)	33,936	51–60	16
112	August 5	@ Mariners	3–1	Dickey (9–11)	Iwakuma (10–5)	Janssen (20)	32,300	52–60	15
113	August 6	@ Mariners	7–2	Johnson (2–8)	Hernández (11–5)		28,198	53–60	15
114	August 7	@ Mariners	7–9	Maurer (3–7)	Loup (4–4)	Farquhar (3)	34,792	53–61	16
115	August 9	Athletics	6–14	Parker (8–6)	Rogers (3–7)		31,862	53–62	15½
116	August 10	Athletics	5–4	Buehrle (8–7)	Gray (0–1)	Janssen (21)	39,634	54–62	15½
117	August 11	Athletics	4–6	Cook (4–2)	Oliver (3–3)	Balfour (30)	45,312	54–63	15½
118	August 12	Athletics	1–5	Cook (5–2)	Janssen (4–1)		36,111	54–64	16
119	August 13	Red Sox	2–4 (11)	Uehara (3–0)	Loup (4–5)		32,816	54–65	17
120	August 14	Red Sox	4–3 (10)	Lincoln (1–1)	Workman (3–2)		31,695	55–65	16
121	August 15	Red Sox	2–1	Buehrle (9–7)	Peavy (9–5)	Janssen (22)	40,477	56–65	15
122	August 16	@ Rays	4–5	Rodney (5–3)	Loup (4–6)		15,433	56–66	15
123	August 17	@ Rays	6–2	Happ (3–2)	Hernández (6–13)		25,036	57–66	15
124	August 18	@ Rays	1–2 (10)	McGee (3–3)	Lincoln (1–2)		23,373	57–67	15
125	August 20	@ Yankees	4–8	Nova (7–4)	Wagner (2–4)		40,248	57–68	16
126	August 20	@ Yankees	2–3	Rivera (4–2)	Oliver (3–4)		37,190	57–69	16
127	August 21	@ Yankees	2–4	Huff (1–0)	Dickey (9–12)	Rivera (37)	36,140	57–70	17
128	August 22	@ Yankees	3–5	Pettitte (9–9)	Happ (3–3)	Robertson (2)	40,116	57–71	17½
129	August 23	@ Astros	4–12	Lyles (6–6)	Redmond (1–2)		21,186	57–72	17½
130	August 24	@ Astros	5–8	Peacock (3–4)	Wang (1–2)	Lo (2)	26,312	57–73	18½
131	August 25	@ Astros	2–1	Buehrle (10–7)	Lo (0–2)	Janssen (23)	21,407	58–73	18½
132	August 26	Yankees	5–2	Dickey (10–12)	Hughes (4–13)	Janssen (24)	35,241	59–73	18
133	August 27	Yankees	1–7	Pettitte (10–9)	Happ (3–4)		34,047	59–74	19
134	August 28	Yankees	7–2	Redmond (2–2)	Kuroda (11–10)		36,565	60–74	19
135	August 30	Royals	3–2	Buehrle (11–7)	Santana (8–8)	Janssen (25)	21,031	61–74	18½
136	August 31	Royals	4–2	Dickey (11–12)	Herrera (5–7)	Janssen (26)	34,315	62–74	18½

September 12–14 (Home 5–8, Road 7–6)

#	Date	Opponent	Score	Win	Loss	Save	Attendance	Record	GB
137	September 1	Royals	0–5	Shields (10–8)	Happ (3–5)		22,961	62–75	19½
138	September 2	@ D-backs	4–1	Rogers (4–7)	McCarthy (3–9)	Janssen (27)	21,014	63–75	18½
139	September 3	@ D-backs	10–4	Redmond (3–2)	Miley (9–10)		19,100	64–75	18½
140	September 4	@ D-backs	3–4 (10)	Harris (3–0)	Pérez (0–1)		16,154	64–76	19½
141	September 6	@ Twins	6–5	Dickey (12–12)	Pelfrey (5–11)	Janssen (28)	27,044	65–76	20
142	September 7	@ Twins	11–2	Happ (4–5)	Correia (9–11)		32,882	66–76	20
143	September 8	@ Twins	2–0	Rogers (5–7)	Burton (2–9)	Janssen (29)	29,450	67–76	19
144	September 10	Angels	6–12	Williams (7–10)	Buehrle (11–8)		19,079	67–77	20
145	September 11	Angels	4–5	Wilson (16–6)	Delabar (5–3)	Frieri (32)	17,994	67–78	21
146	September 12	Angels	3–4	Richards (7–6)	Happ (4–6)	Frieri (33)	20,767	67–79	21
147	September 13	Orioles	3–5	Hunter (6–5)	Delabar (5–4)	Johnson (44)	20,024	67–80	22
148	September 14	Orioles	4–3	Jeffress (1–0)	Tillman (16–6)	Janssen (30)	29,942	68–80	22
149	September 15	Orioles	1–3	González (10–7)	Buehrle (11–9)	Johnson (45)	22,331	68–81	23
150	September 17	Yankees	2–0	Dickey (13–12)	Pettitte (10–10)	Janssen (31)	24,894	69–81	22
151	September 18	Yankees	3–4	Huff (3–1)	Delabar (5–5)	Rivera (44)	24,247	69–82	22
152	September 19	Yankees	6–2	Redmond (4–2)	Kuroda (11–12)	Janssen (32)	32,003	70–82	22
153	September 20	@ Red Sox	3–6	Lester (15–8)	Rogers (5–8)	Uehara (20)	37,215	70–83	23
154	September 21	@ Red Sox	4–2	Buehrle (12–9)	Buchholz (11–1)	Janssen (33)	37,569	71–83	22
155	September 22	@ Red Sox	2–5	Doubront (11–6)	Dickey (13–13)	Uehara (21)	37,020	71–84	23
156	September 23	@ White Sox	2–3	Quintana (9–6)	Happ (4–7)	Reed (39)	19,122	71–85	23½
157	September 24	@ Orioles	3–2 (10)	Santos (1–1)	Rodríguez (3–2)	Janssen (34)	16,772	72–85	22½
158	September 25	@ Orioles	5–9	McFarland (3–1)	Rogers (5–9)	Hammel (1)	23,698	72–86	23½
159	September 26	@ Orioles	2–3	González (11–8)	Buehrle (12–10)	Johnson (48)	27,498	72–87	24
160	September 27	Rays	6–3	Dickey (14–13)	Hellickson (12–10)	Santos (1)	27,288	73–87	24
161	September 28	Rays	7–2	Happ (5–7)	Torres (4–2)		33,232	74–87	23
162	September 29	Rays	6–7	Moore (17–4)	Redmond (4–3)	Rodney (37)	44,551	74–88	23

== Farm system ==
Level	Team	League	Manager
AAA	Buffalo Bisons	International League	Marty Brown
AA	New Hampshire Fisher Cats	Eastern League	Gary Allenson
A	Dunedin Blue Jays	Florida State League	Bobby Meacham
A	Lansing Lugnuts	Midwest League	John Tamargo, Jr.
A-Short Season	Vancouver Canadians	Northwest League	Clayton McCullough
Rookie	Bluefield Blue Jays	Appalachian League	Dennis Holmberg
Rookie	GCL Blue Jays	Gulf Coast League	John Schneider

LEAGUE CHAMPIONS: Vancouver
