= Mickey Storey =

American baseball player (born 1986)

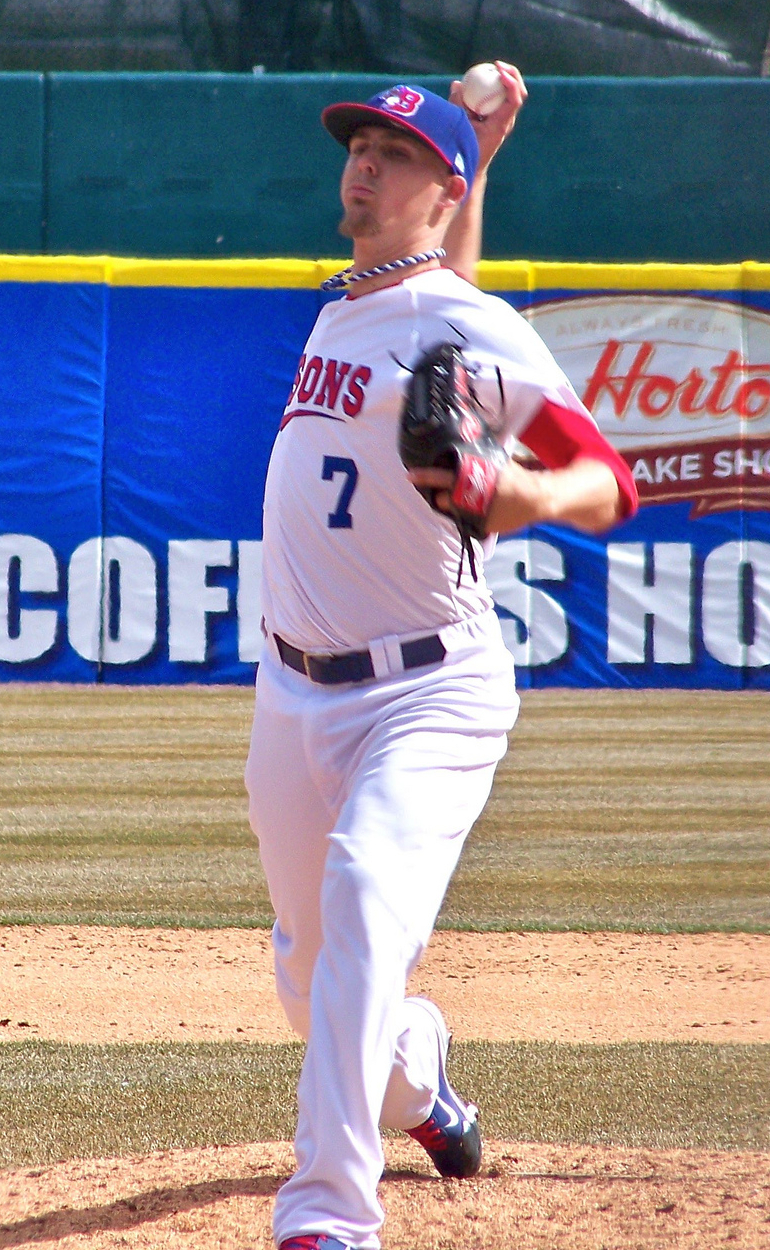
- Storey with the Buffalo Bisons
- Pitcher
- Born: March 16, 1986 (age 40); Fort Lauderdale, Florida, U.S.
- Batted: Right Threw: Right

MLB debut
- August 3, 2012, for the Houston Astros

Last appearance
- August 12, 2013, for the Toronto Blue Jays

MLB statistics
- Win–loss record: 0–1
- Earned run average: 4.19
- Strikeouts: 40
- Stats at Baseball Reference

Teams
- Houston Astros (2012); Toronto Blue Jays (2013)

Mickey Charles Storey (born March 16, 1986) is an American former professional baseball pitcher and current manager of the Houston Astros' Triple-A affiliate, the Sugar Land Space Cowboys. He has pitched in Major League Baseball (MLB) for the Houston Astros and Toronto Blue Jays.

== Playing career ==
=== Amateur career ===
Storey attended Deerfield Beach High School in Deerfield Beach, Florida, and Florida Atlantic University, where he played baseball for the Owls under head coach Kevin Cooney. In 2006 and 2007, he played collegiate summer baseball with the Bourne Braves of the Cape Cod Baseball League. He was drafted by the Minnesota Twins in the 22nd round of the 2007 MLB draft but did not sign and was then drafted by the Oakland Athletics in the 31st round of the 2008 MLB draft.

=== Oakland Athletics ===
Storey made his professional debut with the rookie-level Arizona League Athletics in 2008, where he was 2–2 with a 3.27 ERA in 14 games. In 2009, he led all Oakland minor leaguers with 18 saves while playing across four different levels with the Single-A Kane County Cougars, High-A Stockton Ports, Double-A Midland RockHounds and Triple-A Sacramento River Cats. In 41 combined games he was 1–1 with a 1.22 ERA. He also played with the Phoenix Desert Dogs of the Arizona Fall League after the season. He split 2010 between Midland and Sacramento and was 6–5 with a 3.64 ERA in 54 games, including his first professional start. He played for Bravos de Margarita in the Venezuelan Winter League at the conclusion of the minor league season. He pitched in 27 games for Midland at the start of the 2011 season and was 2–2 with a 4.03 ERA.

=== Houston Astros ===
The Athletics traded Storey to the Houston Astros in June 2011 in exchange for future considerations. The Astros assigned him to the Triple-A Oklahoma City RedHawks, where he was in 23 games with a 3.99 ERA. He played in the Dominican Winter League for Estrellas de Oriente after the season and returned to Oklahoma City the following year where he pitched in 38 games (making two starts) and was 7–4 with a 3.05 ERA.

Storey made his MLB debut on August 3, 2012, against the Atlanta Braves. He faced two batters spaced over the seventh and eighth innings and got a groundout and a pop fly. On September 12, Storey was hit in the face by a line drive off the bat of the Chicago Cubs' Dave Sappelt and suffered contusions on his right hand and jaw, but only missed a few games. He was in 26 games for the Astros and was 0–1 with a 3.86 ERA.

=== Toronto Blue Jays ===
Storey was claimed off waivers by the New York Yankees on November 20, 2012, then designated for assignment on November 30. He was re-claimed by the Astros on December 6, then designated for assignment again on December 17 when free agent Carlos Pena was signed and then claimed on December 19 by the Toronto Blue Jays. On December 21, the Blue Jays announced Storey had been assigned outright to their Triple-A affiliate Buffalo Bisons. He was brought up to the Blue Jays on May 9, 2013, and optioned back to the Bisons on May 20 when Anthony Gose was recalled. Storey was recalled by the Blue Jays on June 1, and optioned back to Buffalo on June 4. Storey was recalled on August 10 when Juan Pérez was placed on the disabled list. He was sent back to Buffalo on August 16. In three games for the Blue Jays he allowed three runs in four innings.

On March 10, 2014, he was optioned to the Buffalo Bisons. After a couple of stints on the disabled list, he was released on April 29 to make room for Chris Getz on Toronto's 40-man roster. He signed a minor league contract with the Blue Jays on May 23, and was assigned to the Bisons and placed on their disabled list. On August 19, Storey was released again by the Blue Jays organization.

=== Los Angeles Dodgers ===
Storey began 2015 with the Somerset Patriots of the Atlantic League of Professional Baseball but then on May 23, 2015, Storey signed with the Los Angeles Dodgers and was assigned to their Double-A affiliate, the Tulsa Drillers. In four starts he was 1–1 with a 3.47 ERA. The Dodgers released him on June 16, 2015.

=== Somerset Patriots ===
He became a free agent from the Somerset Patriots after the 2016 season.

== Managerial career ==
=== Quad Cities River Bandits ===
For the 2018 season, Storey was named manager of the Quad Cities River Bandits, a Class A affiliate of the Houston Astros.

=== Sugar Land Space Cowboys ===
On January 24, 2019, Storey became manager of the Sugar Land Space Cowboys of the Pacific Coast League (PCL), the Houston Astros' Triple-A affiliate.

Storey also managed the Surprise Saguaros of the Arizona Fall League (AFL) in 2022, leading the club to that year's AFL title.

On May 14, 2024, Storey collected his 400th win in the minor leagues as manager, a 16–7 win over the Albuquerque Dukes.

In 2024, Sugar Land posted a minor-league best 93–56 regular season record, the most wins in all Minor League Baseball for the regular season, and most in the PCL since 1981 when Albuquerque won 94. Sugar Land also claimed both the first- and second-half titles. In the PCL championship, the Space Cowboys defeated the Reno Aces, 5–2, for the best-of-3 series sweep and the franchise's first-ever league title. Next, the Space Cowboys won the Triple-A National Championship Game, 13–6, over the Omaha Storm Chasers, also Sugar Land's first-ever such championship, and first for Storey over a full season as manager. He was named PCL Manager of the Year and to the Triple-A All-Star Game.
