= Melky Cabrera =

Dominican baseball player (born 1984)

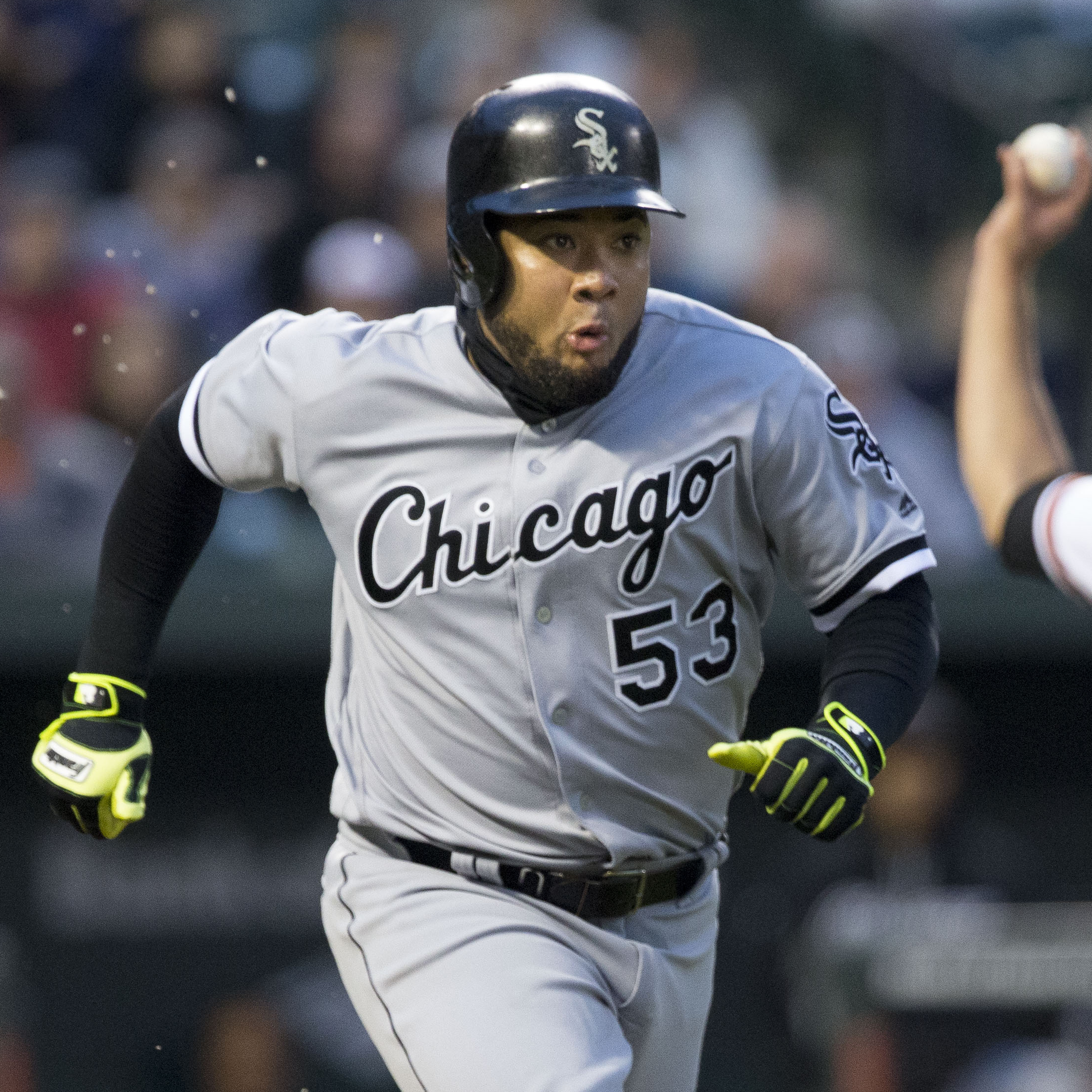
- Cabrera with the Chicago White Sox in 2016
- Outfielder
- Born: August 11, 1984 (age 42); Santo Domingo, Dominican Republic
- Batted: Switch Threw: Left

MLB debut
- July 7, 2005, for the New York Yankees

Last MLB appearance
- September 29, 2019, for the Pittsburgh Pirates

MLB statistics
- Batting average: .285
- Home runs: 144
- Runs batted in: 854
- Stats at Baseball Reference

Teams
- New York Yankees (2005–2009); Atlanta Braves (2010); Kansas City Royals (2011); San Francisco Giants (2012); Toronto Blue Jays (2013–2014); Chicago White Sox (2015–2017); Kansas City Royals (2017); Cleveland Indians (2018); Pittsburgh Pirates (2019)

Career highlights and awards
- All-Star (2012); World Series champion (2009)
Medals
Men's baseball
Representing Dominican Republic
Olympic Games
Bronze medal – third place	2020 Tokyo	Team

Melky Cabrera Astacio (born August 11, 1984), nicknamed "the Melkman", is a Dominican former professional baseball outfielder. He played in Major League Baseball (MLB) for the New York Yankees, Atlanta Braves, San Francisco Giants, Toronto Blue Jays, Chicago White Sox, Kansas City Royals, Cleveland Indians, and Pittsburgh Pirates. While primarily a left fielder throughout his career, Cabrera spent a significant amount of his playing time as a center fielder for the Royals and Yankees.

Cabrera signed with the Yankees as an amateur free agent. He made his MLB debut for the Yankees in 2005. After playing as a fourth outfielder, the Yankees included him in a trade to the Braves after the 2009 season. Struggling with the Braves in 2010, he was released, and signed by the Royals in 2011. Cabrera had a strong year with the Royals, and was traded to the Giants for the 2012 season. In 2012, Cabrera made his first All-Star Game appearance, winning the All-Star Game MVP Award.

== Early life ==
Melky Cabrera Astacio was born on August 11, 1984, in Santo Domingo, Dominican Republic.

== Professional career ==
=== Minor leagues ===
Cabrera was signed by the New York Yankees on November 14, 2001, at age 17, receiving a $175,000 signing bonus. He played for the Staten Island Yankees in the Class A Short-Season New York–Penn League in 2003, batting .283 with 31 runs batted in (RBIs) in 67 games. In 2004, he was promoted to the Battle Creek Yankees of the Class A Midwest League, hitting .333 with 16 RBIs in 42 games. He was promoted to the Tampa Yankees of the Class A-Advanced Florida State League, where he hit .288 with 51 RBIs in 85 games to finish the season.

=== New York Yankees (2005–2009) ===
==== 2005 season ====
In 2005, Cabrera started off with the Trenton Thunder of the Double-A Eastern League, hitting .275 with 60 RBIs in 106 games. At the end of June, he was promoted to the Columbus Clippers of the Triple-A International League, where he hit .324 with three homers and 11 RBIs in nine games. On July 7, he made his major league debut in center field at Yankee Stadium against the Cleveland Indians. He collected his first major league hit, a single, in his third at-bat that day. The next day he went 2-for-3 against Cleveland Indians pitcher Cliff Lee, scoring his first major league run, but then went 0-for-his-next-13 and made costly miscues, including one on July 15, 2005, against the Boston Red Sox at Fenway Park, misplaying a Trot Nixon fly ball that resulted in an inside-the-park home run during a 17–1 defeat. He was sent down to Triple-A Columbus the next day for 17 games and then demoted again, back to Double-A Trenton to finish out the season. Cabrera played in six Major Leagues games in 2005, batting .211.

==== 2006 season ====
Cabrera saw a lot of time in spring training of 2006 with starting outfielders Johnny Damon and Bernie Williams playing in the World Baseball Classic. He impressed the Yankees by hitting .349 in 16 games, but was ultimately sent down to Triple-A Columbus at the start of the season.

He started the season strongly at Triple-A Columbus, hitting .385 with four home runs and 24 RBIs in just 31 games before being called up on May 9, 2006, after left fielder Hideki Matsui broke his wrist and was on the disabled list until September 12, 2006. Cabrera replaced him in left field, and hit .318 in May with his first 10 career RBIs and two career stolen bases. On May 30, 2006, batting leadoff for only the second time in his career, he recorded his first career 4-hit game, going 4-for-6. He slumped in June, but hit his first major league home run on June 15. On June 6, 2006, in the eighth inning of a 2–1 game against the Red Sox, he made an outstanding catch in left-center, leaping over the wall to take a home run away from Boston slugger Manny Ramírez. This play earned Cabrera a "This Year In Baseball" award (voted on by the fans) for the outstanding play of the 2006 season.

Cabrera heated up again in July, hitting .313 with 14 RBIs. He had his first career five-RBI game on July 5, with his first career grand slam. On the 18th, he hit his first career walk-off home run. At 22, he was the second youngest Yankee ever to hit a walk-off home run, to the 21-year-old Mickey Mantle in 1953. He finished the 2006 season tied for second in the league with 12 outfield assists. In 130 games, Cabrera batted .280 with seven home runs and 50 RBI. After the 2006 season, he played for Águilas Cibaeñas of the Dominican Professional Baseball League (LIDOM).

==== 2007 season ====
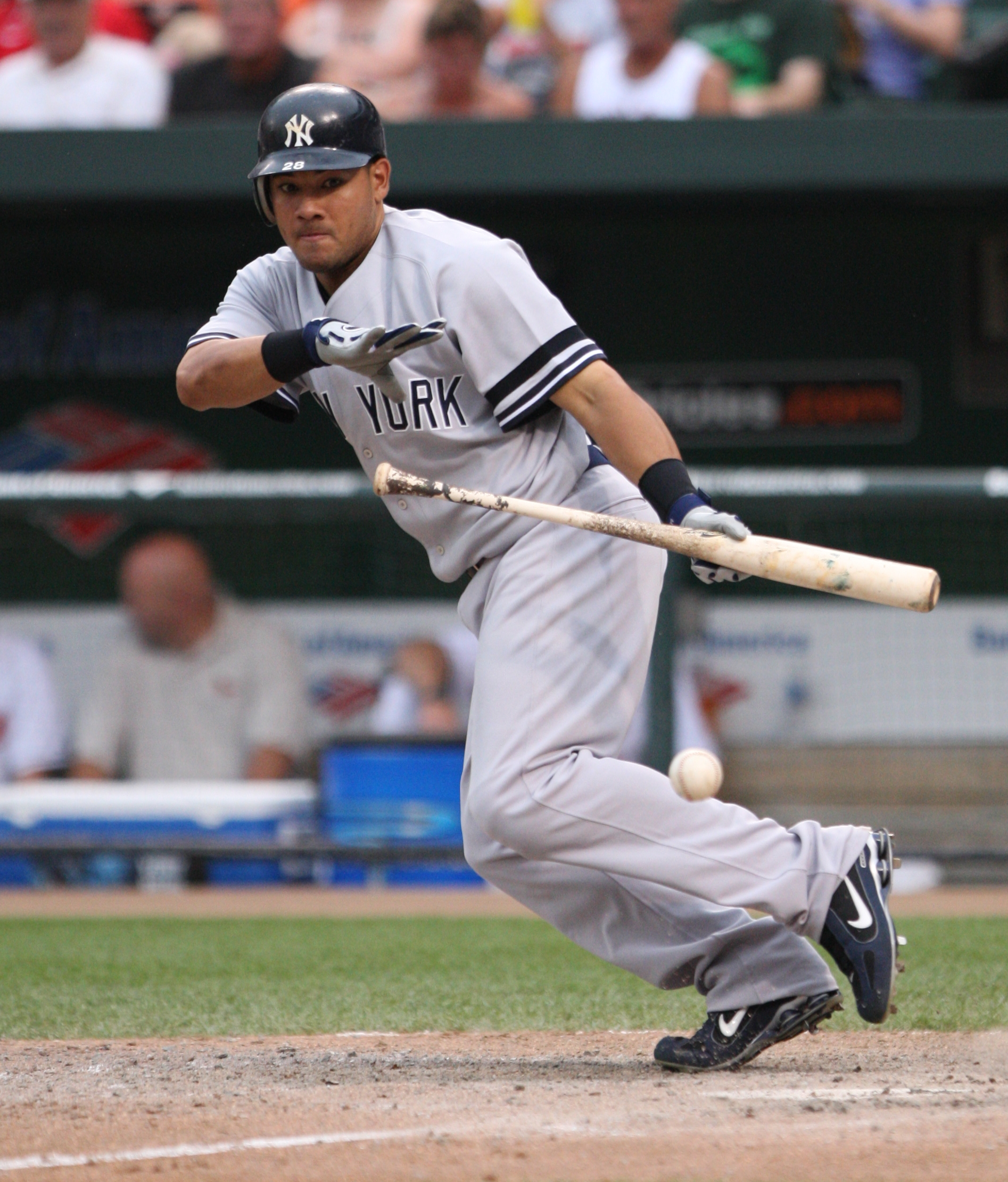
Cabrera bunting for the New York Yankees in 2007

Cabrera was slotted as fourth outfielder at the beginning of the 2007 season. He struggled, batting only .200 in April and .254 in May with limited playing time. He was batting .223 on the season when Jason Giambi went on the disabled list on June 1, 2007, giving him more playing time as Damon assumed Giambi's role of designated hitter and Cabrera took over center field from Damon. After this, he hit .320 with three of his five home runs and 21 of his 36 RBIs. He also had a 13-game hitting streak from July 1 to 17. While Bobby Abreu was struggling that month, Cabrera hit second to enable Derek Jeter to hit third and cemented himself as the Yankees' starting center fielder, causing Giambi to compete with Damon for DH at-bats after returning from the DL. Cabrera had a career-high hitting streak of 19 games, while continued to get his share of walks. Prior to the July 31 trade deadline, the Texas Rangers offered Yankee GM Brian Cashman their closer, Éric Gagné, in exchange for Cabrera, but Cashman declined and Cabrera went on to tie for third in outfield assists (16) for the season. In 150 games to finish 2007, Cabrera batted .273 with eight home runs and 73 RBI.

==== 2008 season ====
Cabrera was involved in a bench-clearing brawl against the Tampa Bay Rays in a 2008 spring training game. MLB claimed to have seen video showing Cabrera punching superstar Tampa third baseman Evan Longoria during the brawl, and suspended him for two games along with teammate Shelley Duncan. Third base coach Bobby Meacham and hitting coach Kevin Long were also fined an undisclosed amount for their actions in the brawl.

Cabrera was a less-than-adequate hitter for the Yankees in 2008. His fielding and strong throwing arm in center field could not make up for his poor batting average. In early August, Yankee manager Joe Girardi demoted him to fourth outfielder, making Damon the everyday center fielder again. On August 15, 2008, Cabrera was demoted to Triple-A's Scranton/Wilkes-Barre Yankees, but recalled him on September 5. Playing 129 games in 2008, Cabrera finished with a .249 batting average, eight home runs, and 37 RBI. After the 2008 season, he played for Cibaeñas of the LIDOM.

==== 2009 season ====
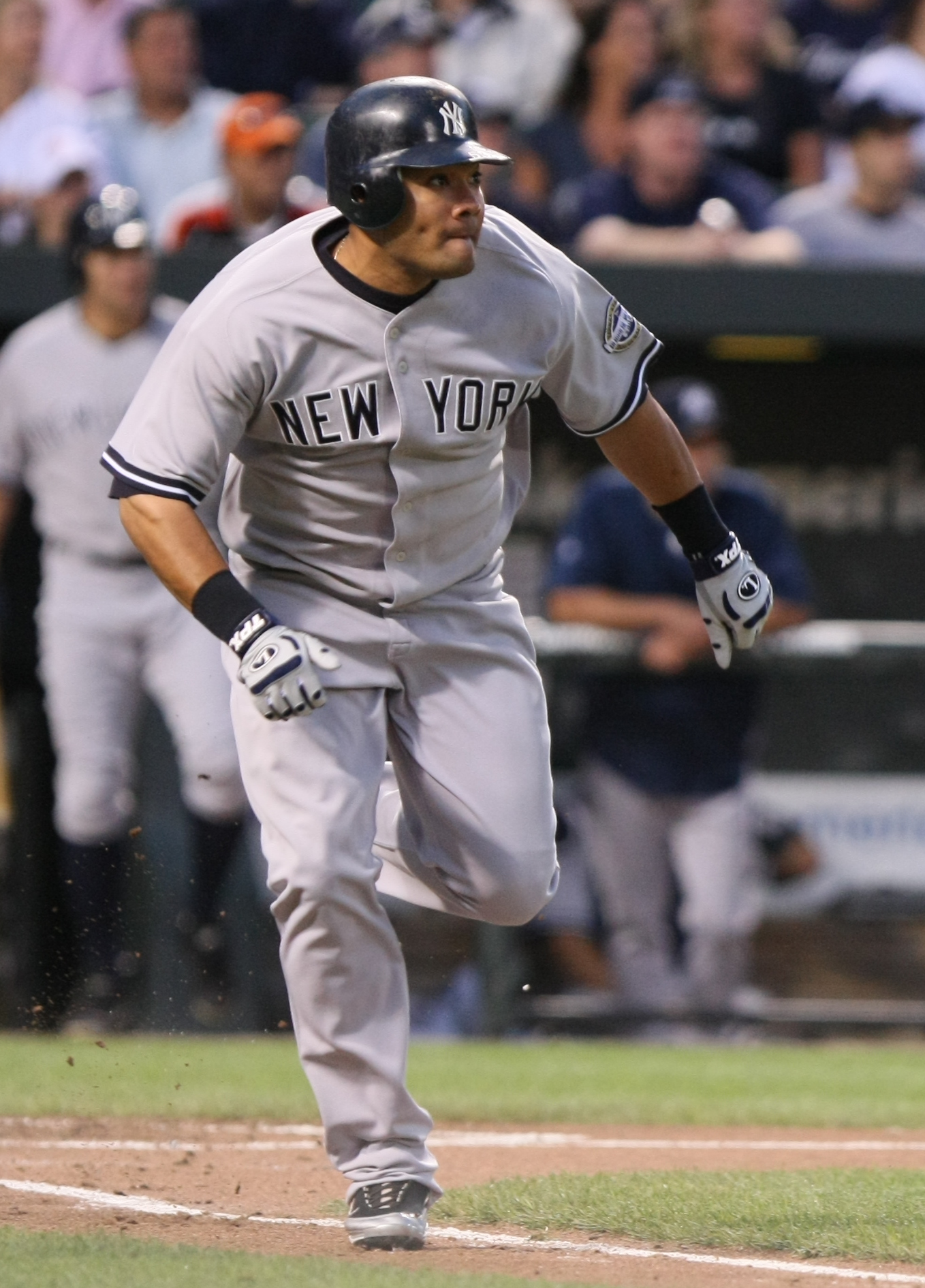
Cabrera with the New York Yankees in 2009

After the 2008 season, the Yankees came close to trading Cabrera to the Milwaukee Brewers for veteran outfielder, Mike Cameron. Remaining with the Yankees, Cabrera competed with Brett Gardner for the starting center field job which Gardner won, relegating Cabrera to a backup role by manager Girardi once again. On April 22, however, Cabrera hit the first walk-off hit in the new Yankee Stadium, a two-run homer in the bottom of the 14th, for a 9–7 Yankee win. By late April, with Gardner slumping and Cabrera's streak of stellar play, Cabrera once again became the starting center fielder. He won the Major League Baseball Clutch Performer of the Month of May.

On August 2, 2009, he became the first Yankee to hit for the cycle since Tony Fernández did on September 3, 1995. The home run was his 10th of the season, a new personal high. He would finish the season with a .274 batting average, thirteen home runs, and 68 RBI in 154 games. The Yankees finished the year with a 103–59 record and eventually won the World Series over the Philadelphia Phillies, giving Cabrera his first championship title and the Yankees their 27th title overall.

=== Atlanta Braves (2010) ===
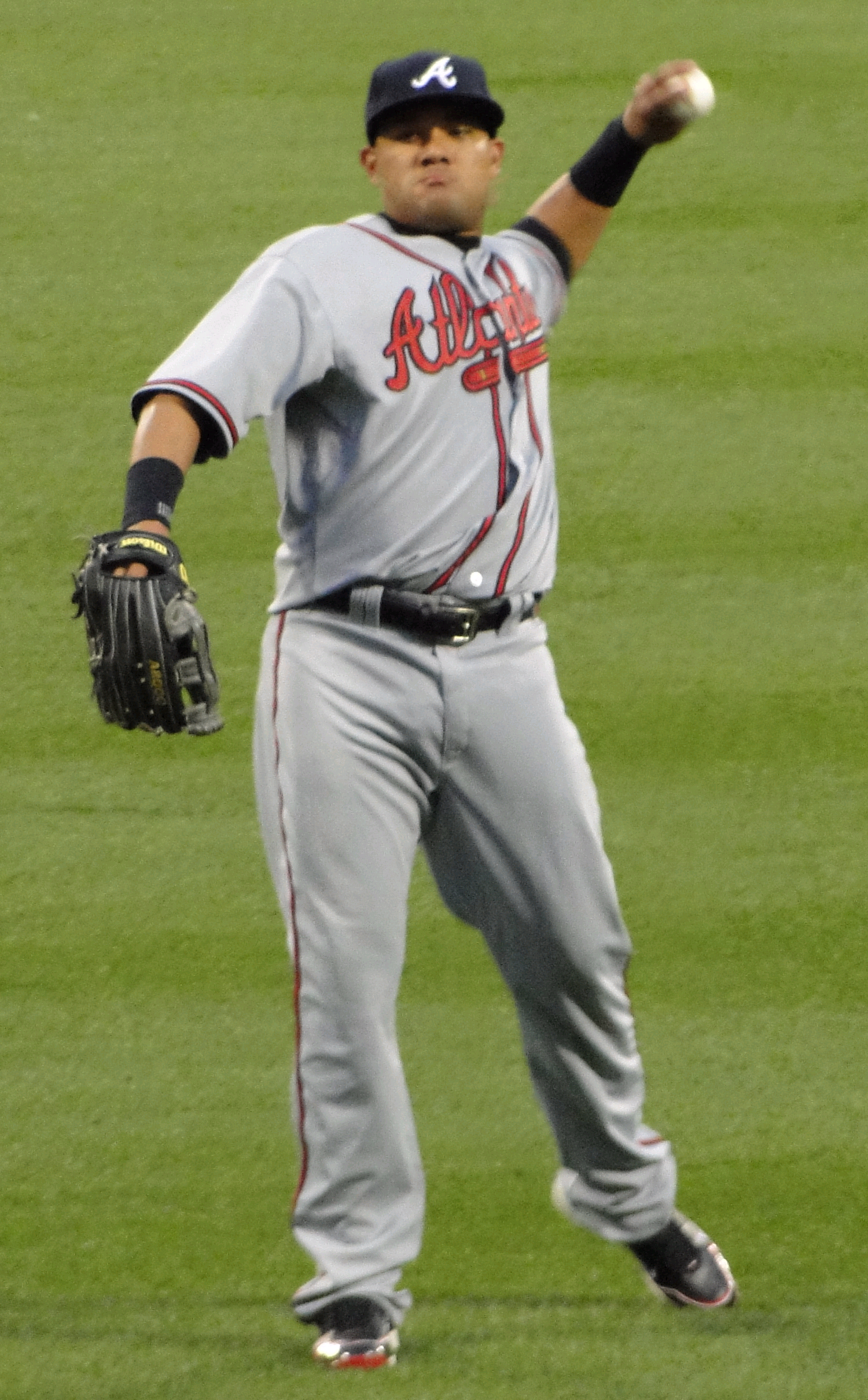
Cabrera playing for the Atlanta Braves in 2010

On December 22, 2009, the Yankees traded Cabrera to the Atlanta Braves with Mike Dunn and pitching prospect Arodys Vizcaino for Javier Vázquez and Boone Logan, with whom he signed a one-year deal worth $3.1 million with the Braves, avoiding arbitration.

Cabrera hit .255 with four home runs and 42 RBIs in 115 games for the 2010 Braves, and went 0-for-8 in the 2010 NLDS against the San Francisco Giants, who won the series three games to one. He batted eighth for the Braves and was described as "pudgy" and not diligent enough about his career to keep his weight down. The Braves released him on October 19.

=== Kansas City Royals (2011) ===
On December 9, 2010, Cabrera signed a one-year, $1.25 million contract with the Kansas City Royals, eager for an opportunity to start consistently and hit in the middle of the lineup.

In his 2011 breakout season, he set career highs in RBIs (87), runs scored (102), stolen bases (20), home runs (18) and batting average (.305), while finishing fourth in the American League in hits with 201 and becoming the sixth Royal to record at least 200 hits in a season.

=== San Francisco Giants (2012) ===
On November 7, 2011, the Royals traded Cabrera to the San Francisco Giants for Jonathan Sánchez and minor league pitcher Ryan Verdugo, seeking to bolster their starting rotation and free up center field for Lorenzo Cain.

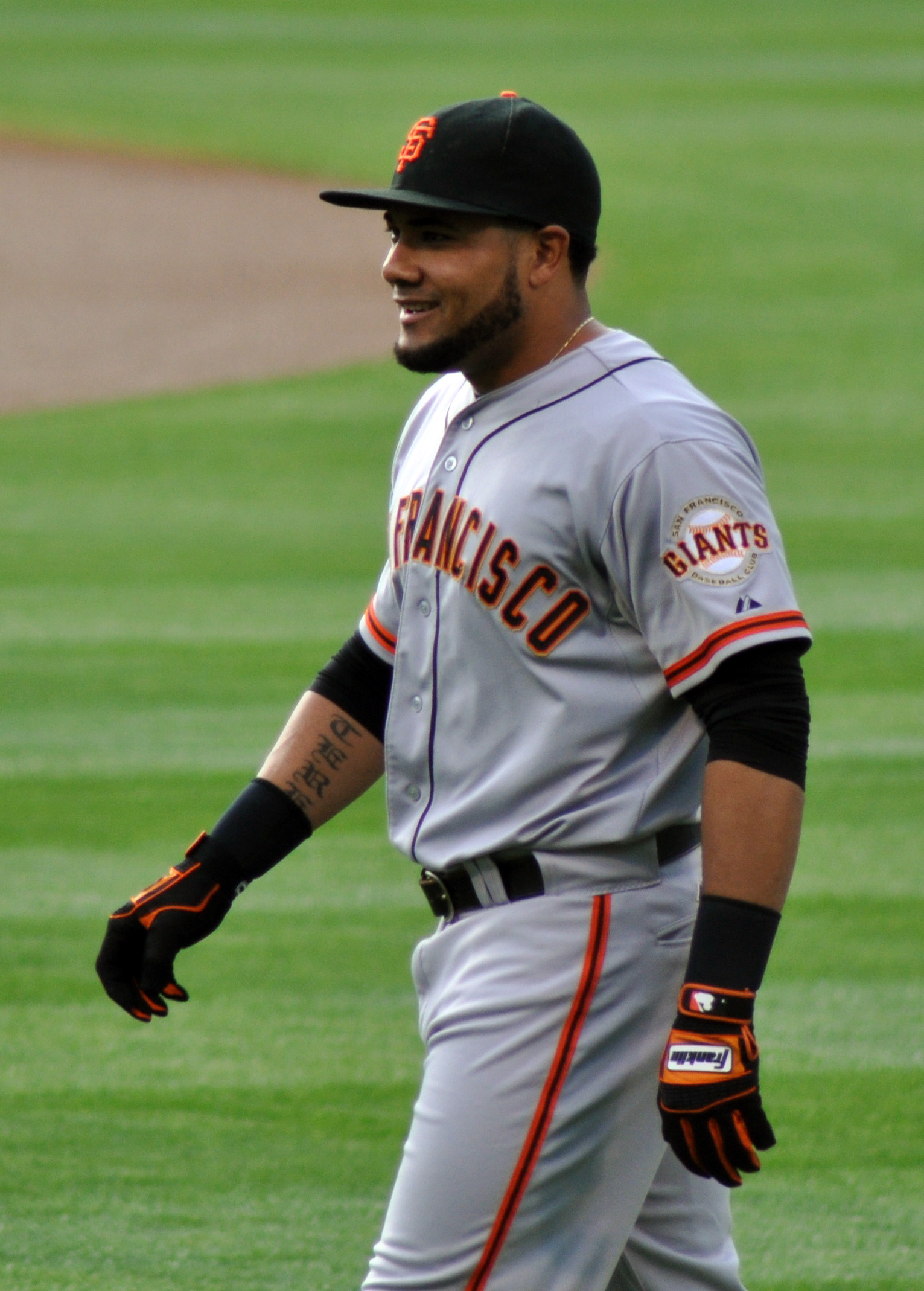
Cabrera with the San Francisco Giants in 2012

Cabrera started 2012 with a .275 career average, but on May 29 he surpassed Willie Mays for most hits in the month of May in franchise history with 50. The next night, he tied Randy Winn's San Francisco record for most hits in any month with 51.

His hot hitting earned him one of the three starting outfielder positions for the 2012 Major League Baseball All-Star Game in Kansas City with 7,521,784 votes, the highest number received by a National League (NL) outfielder that year. He singled in the first and hit a two-run homer in the fourth (the only round-tripper of the game) and was voted the All-Star Game MVP in the NL's 8–0 shutout win, going 2-for-3 with the two RBIs. He was the fifth Giant player to be honored as All-Star Game MVP.

On August 15, 2012, Cabrera was suspended for 50 games without pay for testing positive for high levels of testosterone, suggesting usage of MLB-proscribed performance-enhancing drugs. He admitted using a banned substance and was forced to accept the suspension. The suspension was effective immediately, meaning that Cabrera would take no further part for the remainder of the 2012 season. The suspension would also rule him out to start the 2013 season or if the Giants play enough games in the postseason (if the team clinched). Prior to his suspension, he led the majors with 159 hits and was second in the NL with a .346 batting average. He ended his suspension-shortened season with 11 home runs, 10 triples, 60 RBI and 13 stolen bases in 18 opportunities. One of Cabrera's associates purchased a website for $10,000 and falsified its contents in a way that would have allowed Cabrera to challenge his suspension by claiming that the positive test was caused by a substance sold through that website, but MLB officials and federal investigators used forensics to trace the website back to Cabrera. At his own request, Cabrera was ruled ineligible to win the 2012 NL batting title. (Note: Cabrera's 501 plate appearances were one short of the minimum to qualify, but Rule 10.22(a) would have allowed him to qualify by adding the needed extra at-bat when calculating his batting average. The rule would have made him the batting champion instead of teammate Buster Posey, who batted .336.)

As the Giants clinched a postseason berth, Cabrera's suspension officially expired during the 2012 National League Championship Series. Although the suspension expired, the team decided to shut down Cabrera for the remainder of the postseason and revert him to the restricted list. The Giants would then go on to win the 2012 World Series over the Detroit Tigers. Despite his suspension, Cabrera received a 2012 World Series ring for his contributions to the team before his suspension.

=== Toronto Blue Jays (2013–2014) ===
==== 2013 season ====
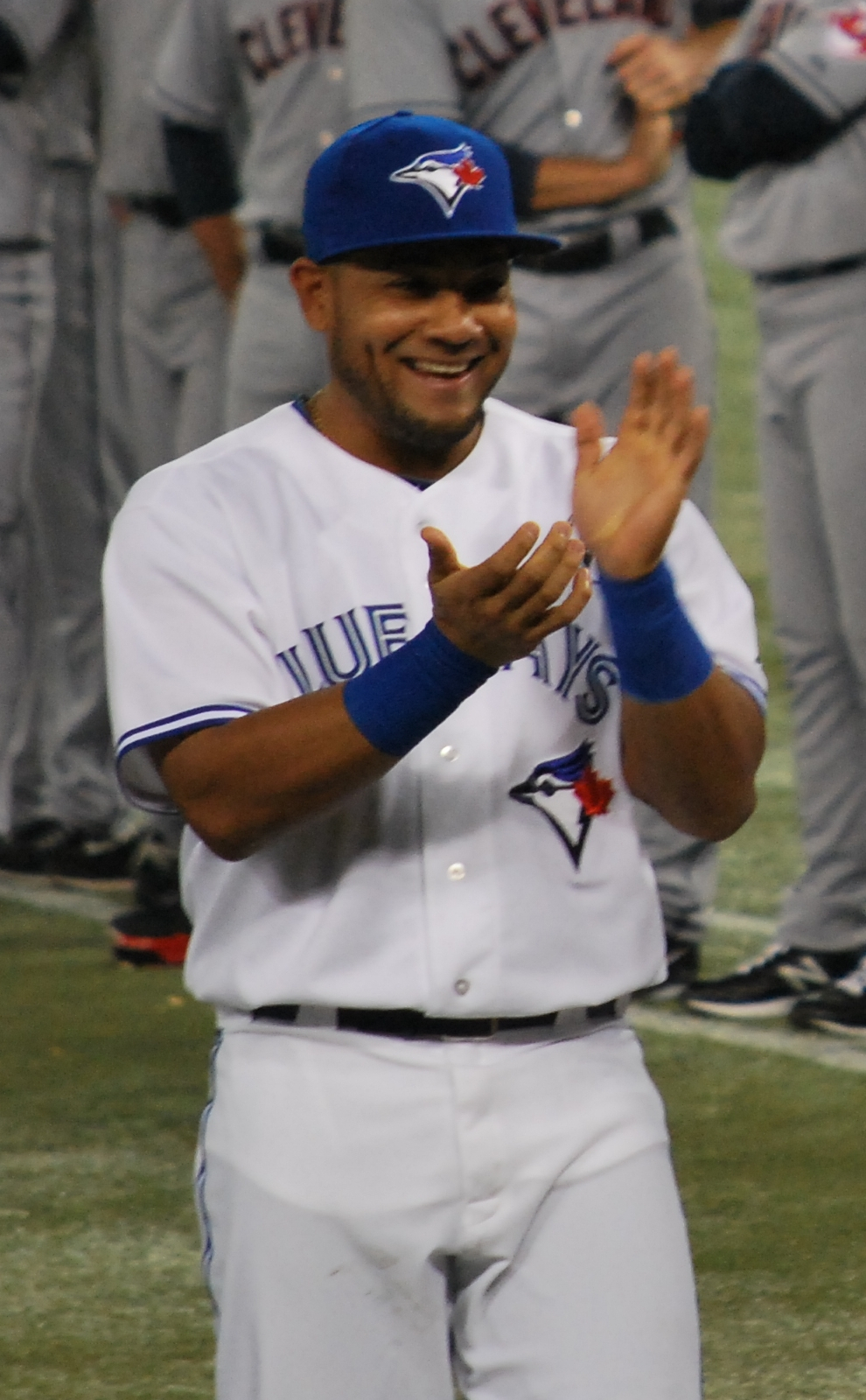
Cabrera with the Toronto Blue Jays on 2013 Opening Day

Cabrera signed a two-year contract for $16 million with the Toronto Blue Jays on November 19, 2012. In a game against the Detroit Tigers on April 9, 2013, Cabrera recorded his 1,000th career hit, a single off starter Aníbal Sánchez. Cabrera battled a sore hamstring and quadriceps muscle through the first two months of the regular season, but the injuries did not warrant time on the disabled list. Cabrera was occasionally removed from games in the later innings to rest his legs.

In early June, it was reported that Major League Baseball would be pursuing suspensions for players implicated in the Biogenesis scandal, including Cabrera. Cabrera could have faced supplemental discipline regardless of the fact that he served a 50-game suspension at the end of the 2012 regular season, as MLB planned to further suspend players involved in the scandal for trying to cover their use of banned substances by using pseudonyms to purchase Biogenesis products or for falsely denying any involvement whatsoever. Cabrera responded to the speculation about a second suspension, saying "If they suspend me again, I think that would be a harsh punishment because I already served my sentence. But it's up to them. I believe I've already served my sentence, especially missing the playoffs. That's what hurt me the most."

Cabrera was placed on the 15-day disabled list on June 27 due to left knee tendinitis. Fan and player favorite Munenori Kawasaki was called up to take Cabrera's roster spot. Cabrera returned from the disabled list on July 21 and played in 10 games before going back on the 15-day DL with irritation in his left knee. Neil Wagner was recalled to take Cabrera's roster spot.

On August 5, 2013, Cabrera was among several implicated players not suspended following the resolution of the Biogenesis investigation. It was reported on August 8 that Cabrera would be out of the lineup until at least September for a left knee injury. Manager John Gibbons told reporters on August 22 that Cabrera would not play for the rest of the season. On September 7, Toronto general manager Alex Anthopoulos told reporters that Cabrera had undergone a successful surgery to remove a benign tumor from his lower spine on August 30, and that a full recovery was expected. Shortened to 88 games in 2013, Cabrera batted .279 with three home runs and 30 RBI.

==== 2014 season ====
Having recovered from his offseason surgery, Cabrera played fully in 2014 spring training, and led the majors in hits and doubles during the spring with 30 and 10 respectively. He hit his only home run in the final game of spring training, a two-run shot to help the Blue Jays win 2–0 over the New York Mets on March 29 in Montreal. On April 4, 2014, Cabrera became the first MLB player to bat against Masahiro Tanaka, and hit a lead-off solo home run off of him. He would go on to record a four-game home run streak, besting his total of home runs from the previous season (3 in 88 games played). Cabrera broke a Blue Jays team record on April 13, by hitting in his 13th consecutive game to open the season. He would continue his hot hitting to open the season, setting another new Blue Jays franchise record for hits prior to May 1, when he recorded his 40th hit in a game against the Kansas City Royals on April 29. On May 1, he and teammate Mark Buehrle were named the co-winners of the Honda Player of the Month Award for April. Cabrera recorded his 500th career RBI on July 26, 2014, to aid the Blue Jays in breaking their 17-game losing streak at Yankee Stadium. On August 10, Cabrera drew a team-record five walks in a 6–5 win over the Detroit Tigers in 19 innings; the longest game in franchise history. He also became the first player to reach base eight times in one game (the aforementioned five walks along with three hits) since Hall-of-Famer Rod Carew did so in 1972.

In a game against the Boston Red Sox on September 5, Cabrera was injured while diving back to first base in the third inning and left the game. He remained in the game but came out during his next at-bat in the sixth inning and was taken for x-rays, where it was determined that he had broken his right little finger and would require surgery, ending his 2014 season. At the time of his injury, he had 171 hits, second in the league to Jose Altuve, and had a .301 batting average. Coming to the end of his two-year contract with the Blue Jays, Cabrera expressed a desire to re-sign with Toronto. On November 1, the Blue Jays extended a qualifying offer to Cabrera for $15.3 million, which he later rejected.

=== Chicago White Sox (2015–2017) ===
After the 2014 season, Cabrera signed a three-year, $42 million contract with the Chicago White Sox. In his first season with the White Sox in 2015, Cabrera played 158 games batting .273 with 36 doubles, 12 home runs, and 77 RBIs. In his second season with the White Sox in 2016, Cabrera played 151 games batting .296 with 14 home runs. In his third year with the White Sox before being traded to the Kansas City Royals, Cabrera batted .295 with 13 home runs and 56 RBIs in 98 games.

=== Return to Kansas City (2017) ===
The White Sox traded Cabrera to the Royals for A. J. Puckett and Andre Davis on July 30, 2017. Melky hit .269/.303/.399 with 60 hits and 4 home runs in 58 games with the Royals.

=== Cleveland Indians (2018) ===
On April 25, 2018, Cabrera signed a minor league contract with the Cleveland Indians. On May 20, he was called up by the Indians. Cabrera was designated for assignment on June 14, cleared waivers on June 18, and elected free agency. He re-signed a minor league contract with the Indians on July 5, 2018. The Indians purchased Cabrera's contract for a second time on July 20, 2018. He elected free agency on October 29, 2018.

=== Pittsburgh Pirates (2019) ===
On February 10, 2019, Cabrera signed a minor league contract with the Pittsburgh Pirates that included an invitation to spring training. On March 23, the Pirates announced that Cabrera had made the opening day roster.

In 2019, he batted .280/.313/.399. He had the slowest sprint speed of all National League right fielders, at 25.9 feet/second. He had the worst jump of all major league outfielders (-4.9 feet vs. average).

=== New York Mets ===
On June 29, 2020, the New York Mets signed Cabrera. He was released on July 22. After the 2020 season, he played for Águilas Cibaeñas of the LIDOM. He has also played for Dominican Republic in the 2021 Caribbean Series.

On January 14, 2022, Cabrera announced his retirement.

== Personal life ==
In the offseason, Cabrera lives in Tampa. Cabrera and Robinson Canó became close friends as teammates in the minor leagues. Cabrera has four daughters, two of them with his wife Johana Cabrera and two older ones who reside with their mothers. His nickname around the Yankee clubhouse was "Leche" which is Spanish for "milk."

Cabrera is involved in charity work in his native Dominican Republic.

== Honors and awards ==
- Futures Game selection (2005)
- Play of the Year (GIBBY awards) (2006)
- 2009 World Series champion
- 2012 MLB All-Star
- 2012 MLB All-Star Game MVP

== See also ==
- List of Major League Baseball players from the Dominican Republic
- List of Major League Baseball players suspended for performance-enhancing drugs
- List of Major League Baseball players to hit for the cycle
- List of Olympic medalists in baseball

Achievements
Preceded by Michael Cuddyer	Hitting for the cycle August 2, 2009	Succeeded by Troy Tulowitzki
