= Neil Wagner (baseball) =

American baseball player (born 1984)

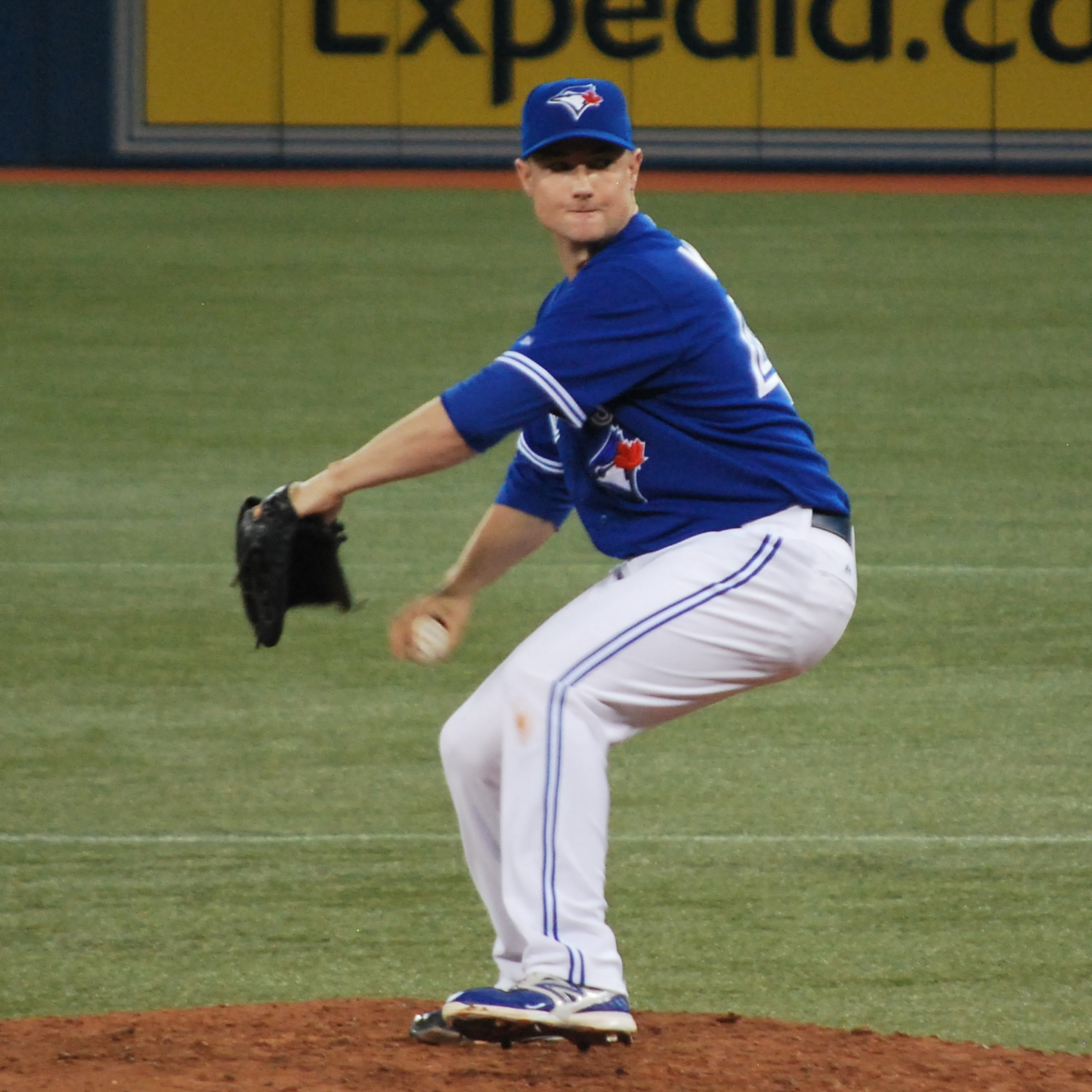
- Wagner with the Toronto Blue Jays
- Pitcher
- Born: January 1, 1984 (age 42); Minneapolis, Minnesota, U.S.
- Batted: Right Threw: Right

Professional debut
- MLB: August 30, 2011, for the Oakland Athletics
- NPB: May 30, 2018, for the Saitama Seibu Lions

Last appearance
- MLB: May 14, 2014, for the Toronto Blue Jays
- NPB: September 13, 2019, for the Saitama Seibu Lions

MLB statistics
- Win–loss record: 2–4
- Earned run average: 4.92
- Strikeouts: 43

NPB statistics
- Win–loss record: 2–1
- Earned run average: 4.91
- Strikeouts: 32
- Stats at Baseball Reference

Teams
- Oakland Athletics (2011); Toronto Blue Jays (2013–2014); Saitama Seibu Lions (2018–2019)

Neil Kannas Wagner (born January 1, 1984) is an American former professional baseball pitcher. He played in Major League Baseball (MLB) for the Oakland Athletics and Toronto Blue Jays, and in Nippon Professional Baseball (NPB) for the Saitama Seibu Lions.

== Amateur career ==
Wagner attended Eden Prairie High School in Eden Prairie, Minnesota. He enrolled at North Dakota State University, where he played college baseball for the North Dakota State Bison and studied biology and chemistry. He left before graduating.

== Professional career ==
=== Cleveland Indians ===
The Cleveland Indians selected Wagner in the 21st round of the 2005 Major League Baseball draft.

=== Oakland Athletics ===
On May 14, 2010, Wagner was traded to the Oakland Athletics in exchange for cash considerations. He spent the remainder of the year with the Double-A Midland RockHounds, posting a 6-2 record and 3.70 ERA with 45 strikeouts across 33 relief appearances.

Wagner began the 2011 season with Midland, and later received a promotion to the Triple-A Sacramento River Cats. On August 30, 2011, Wagner was selected to the 40-man roster and promoted to the major leagues for the first time.

=== San Diego Padres ===
On May 28, 2012, Wagner was waived by the Athletics and claimed by the San Diego Padres. He spent the remainder of the year with the Triple-A Tucson Padres, posting a 3-1 record and 5.44 ERA with 32 strikeouts over 43 innings of work. Wagner was designated for assignment following the acquisition of Thad Weber on August 23. He became a free agent on November 3.

=== Toronto Blue Jays ===
On November 15, 2012, the Toronto Blue Jays signed Wagner to a minor league contract with that included an invitation to spring training. The deal was announced by the Jays on November 21.

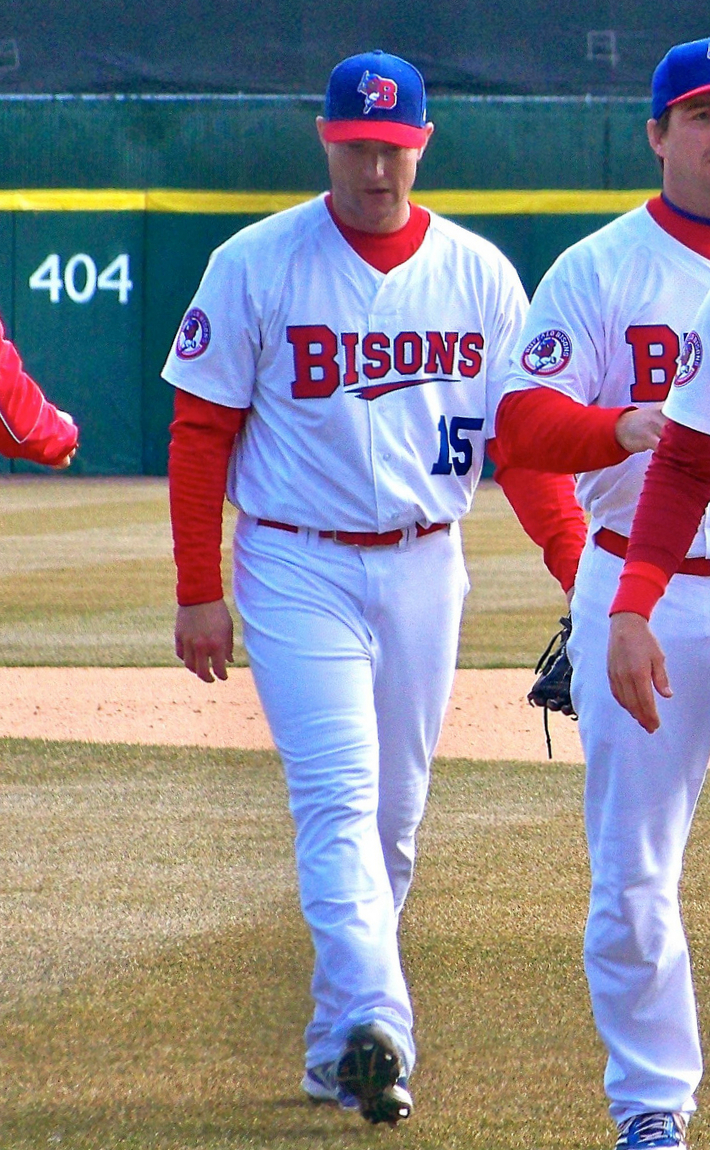
Wagner with the Buffalo Bisons in 2013

Wagner began the 2013 season with the Triple-A Buffalo Bisons. He was called up by the Toronto Blue Jays on May 29. Wagner recorded his first career win in a game on June 7 against the Texas Rangers, pitching 1 1/3 innings in relief. After posting a 2–3 record with a 3.26 ERA and 16 strikeouts in 20 appearances, Wagner was optioned to Triple-A Buffalo on July 21 to make room on the 25-man roster for Melky Cabrera's return from the disabled list. Wagner was recalled when Cabrera went on the disabled list on August 2, 2013.

The Blue Jays optioned Wagner to Buffalo on March 14, 2014. He was recalled by the Blue Jays on April 9, and sent back to Buffalo on April 26. After a consultation with Dr. James Andrews on August 12, it was determined that Wagner would require Tommy John surgery and was expected to miss the rest of the 2014 season as well as the entire 2015 season. In 10 appearances prior to the injury, he had recorded an 8.10 ERA with six strikeouts over 10 innings of work. Wagner was designated for assignment by the Blue Jays on September 1. The following day, Wagner was released.

=== Tampa Bay Rays ===
On September 12, 2014, Wagner signed a two-year minor league contract with the Tampa Bay Rays, that included an invitation to 2016 spring training. He returned to action in 2016, posting a 4.44 ERA with 48 strikeouts across 42 appearances split between the High-A Charlotte Stone Crabs and Triple-A Durham Bulls.

Wagner began the 2017 season with Triple-A Durham, posting an 0-1 record and 3.07 ERA with 41 strikeouts and three saves across 32 appearances (one start). He was released by the Rays organization on August 2, 2017.

=== New York Mets ===
On August 15, 2017, Wagner signed a minor league contract with the New York Mets. Wagner made 8 appearances for the Triple–A Las Vegas 51s, tallying 10 1/3 scoreless innings with 11 strikeouts. He elected free agency following the season on November 6.

=== Saitama Seibu Lions ===
On December 13, 2017, Wagner signed with the Saitama Seibu Lions of Nippon Professional Baseball (NPB). He made 36 appearances for Seibu during the 2018 season, logging a 2-1 record and 4.22 ERA with 24 strikeouts and one save over 32 innings of work. Wagner was placed on waivers on September 28, 2018.
