= Todd Redmond =

American baseball player (born 1985)

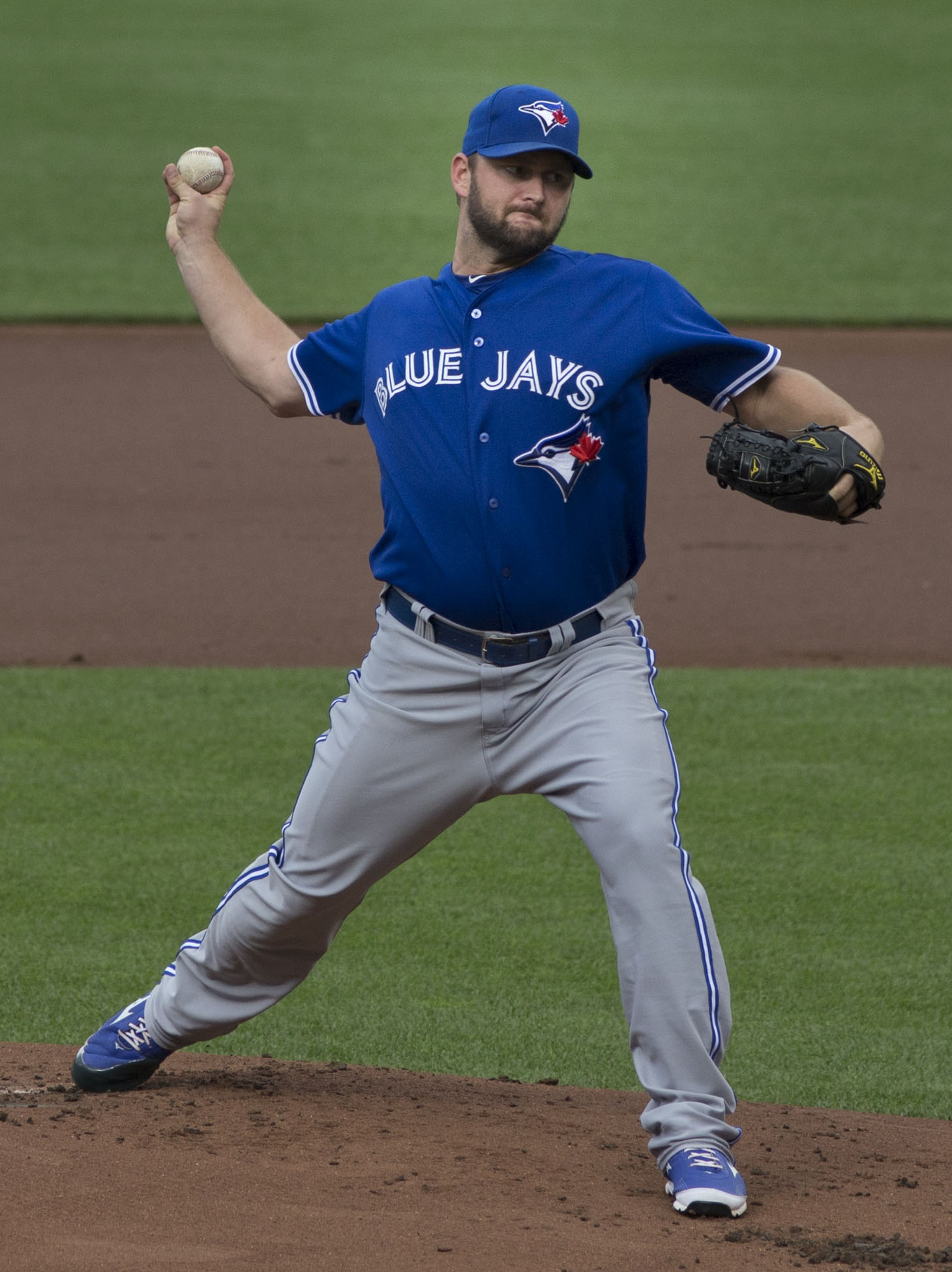
- Redmond with the Toronto Blue Jays
- Pitcher
- Born: May 17, 1985 (age 41); St. Petersburg, Florida, U.S.
- Batted: Right Threw: Right

MLB debut
- August 18, 2012, for the Cincinnati Reds

Last MLB appearance
- July 2, 2015, for the Toronto Blue Jays

MLB statistics
- Win–loss record: 5–8
- Earned run average: 4.25
- Strikeouts: 151
- Stats at Baseball Reference

Teams
- Cincinnati Reds (2012); Toronto Blue Jays (2013–2015)
Medals
Men's baseball
Representing United States
Pan American Games
Silver medal – second place	2011 Guadalajara	National team

Todd Richard Redmond (born May 17, 1985) is an American former professional baseball pitcher. He was selected by the Pittsburgh Pirates in the 2004 MLB draft and traded to the Atlanta Braves four years later, but never appeared with either team. Redmond was acquired by the Cincinnati Reds in 2012, and made his MLB debut later that year. He later spent three seasons with the Toronto Blue Jays.

== Professional career ==
=== Minor leagues ===
Redmond was drafted by the Pittsburgh Pirates in the 39th round of the 2004 MLB draft. Prior to the 2008 season, he was traded to the Atlanta Braves for Tyler Yates.

Redmond threw a no-hitter for the Triple-A Gwinnett Braves against the Louisville Bats on May 28, 2010. On November 2, 2011, the Braves added Redmond to their 40-man roster to prevent him from reaching minor league free agency.

Redmond spent parts of eight seasons in the minor leagues. He was in his fourth season with the Braves' triple-A affiliate in Gwinnett before being called up for the first time in his career on June 17, 2012. He was optioned back to Gwinnett on June 21.

=== Cincinnati Reds ===
Redmond was traded to the Cincinnati Reds on July 14 in exchange for Paul Janish. The Reds immediately sent him to their Triple-A affiliate Louisville Bats. He was called up on July 17, and optioned back on July 18. He was called up on July 31, and optioned back on August 1. Redmond was called up again on August 18 to start the second game of a doubleheader against the Chicago Cubs. He would be the 26th player on the roster. Redmond picked up the loss in the second game, pitching 3 1/3 innings. He gave up a leadoff home run to Brett Jackson in the second inning to give the Cubs an early lead. After giving up consecutive RBI hits to Anthony Rizzo and Starlin Castro in the top of the fourth inning, he was relieved by Alfredo Simon. He was optioned back to the Louisville Bats the next day, August 19. He was designated for assignment on February 1, 2013.

=== Toronto Blue Jays ===
On February 8, 2013, he was claimed off waivers by the Baltimore Orioles. On March 22, 2013, Redmond was claimed by the Toronto Blue Jays, and immediately optioned to the Triple-A Buffalo Bisons.

Redmond spent the first 41 games of the 2013 season on the disabled list with a shoulder injury. He played his first game of the season on May 19 when he started against the Charlotte Knights. Redmond was called up by the Blue Jays on May 29, 2013. On May 31, 2013, he took the loss in a 17-inning game against the San Diego Padres. Redmond was optioned back to Triple-A Buffalo on June 7, 2013. He was recalled on July 3 after Chien-Ming Wang was designated for assignment. Redmond, starting on July 7 against the Minnesota Twins, pitched 5 innings and gave up just 1 hit, a two-run home run to Aaron Hicks. He walked 3 and struck out 4 batters, and left with a 6–2 lead, earning his first career win. Redmond established career-highs in innings pitched and strikeouts with 6 and 10 respectively, in a game against the Houston Astros on July 28, 2013. Redmond was optioned back to Buffalo on August 3, and recalled on August 13.

On May 31, 2014, Redmond earned his first MLB save, pitching 3 innings in relief of Marcus Stroman's first career start. He was announced as the Blue Jays' nominee for the 2014 Roberto Clemente Award on September 17. In 2015, Redmond opened the season in competition with Liam Hendriks for the long-man role out of the bullpen. After 2 appearances, in which he posted a 16.62 ERA with 5 walks and 4 strikeouts, Redmond was designated for assignment on April 16. On April 26, he cleared waivers and was outrighted to Triple-A Buffalo. Redmond was recalled for a spot start on May 18, and designated for assignment the following day. He cleared waivers on May 29, and was assigned outright back to Buffalo. On June 22, Redmond was recalled once again. He was designated for assignment once again on July 2. Redmond elected free agency on October 5.

=== Baltimore Orioles ===
On November 24, 2015, Redmond signed a minor league contract with the Baltimore Orioles. He was released on April 16, 2016.
