= Anthony Gose =

American baseball player (born 1990)

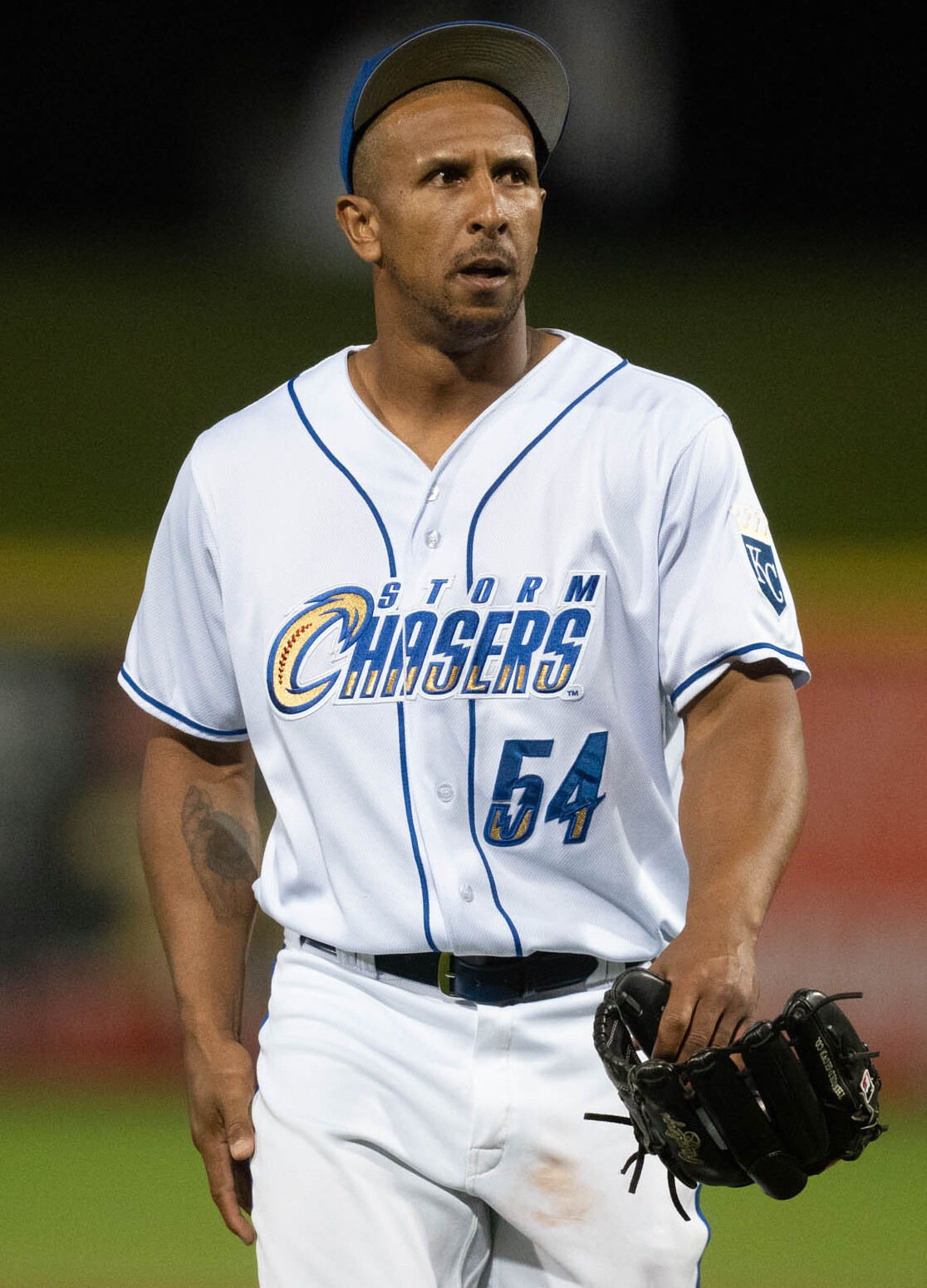
- Gose with the Omaha Storm Chasers

Free agent
- Pitcher / Outfielder
- Born: August 10, 1990 (age 36); Paramount, California, U.S.
- Bats: Left Throws: Left

MLB debut
- July 17, 2012, for the Toronto Blue Jays

MLB statistics (through 2026 season)
- Batting average: .240
- Home runs: 12
- Runs batted in: 69
- Win–loss record: 4–1
- Earned run average: 3.55
- Stats at Baseball Reference

Teams
- Toronto Blue Jays (2012–2014); Detroit Tigers (2015–2016); Cleveland Indians / Guardians (2021–2022, 2024); Kansas City Royals (2026)
Medals
Men's baseball
Representing United States
Olympic Games
Silver medal – second place	2020 Tokyo	Team
WBSC Premier12
Bronze medal – third place	2024 Tokyo	Team

Anthony Robert Gose (/ɡoʊs/; born August 10, 1990) is an American professional baseball pitcher and outfielder who is a free agent. He has previously played in of Major League Baseball (MLB) for the Toronto Blue Jays, Detroit Tigers, Cleveland Guardians, and Kansas City Royals. Originally an outfielder, Gose transitioned from a center fielder to a pitcher, following the 2016 season. Pitching for the United States national team, he won a silver medal at the 2020 Summer Olympics and bronze medal at the 2024 WBSCPremier12.

== Early life ==
Gose attended Bellflower High School in Bellflower, California. In his senior year, he had a .443 batting average, a .618 on-base percentage, and 31 stolen bases for the school's baseball team. He pitched for the team as well, throwing as fast as 97 miles per hour (156 km/h). Gose also competed in track and field. He ran the 100 and 200 meter races, and the 4 × 100 and 4 × 400 meter relays. He also attended the Major League Baseball Urban Youth Academy in Compton, California. He received a scholarship to play college baseball for the Arizona Wildcats.

== Career ==
=== Philadelphia Phillies ===
The Philadelphia Phillies drafted Gose in the second round, with the 51st overall selection, of the 2008 Major League Baseball draft. He opted to sign with the Phillies, forgoing college for a $772,000 signing bonus. Playing for the Lakewood BlueClaws of the Single-A South Atlantic League (SAL) in 2009, he appeared in the SAL All-Star Game. His 76 stolen bases that season led all of minor league baseball.

Gose began the 2010 season with the Clearwater Threshers of the High-A Florida State League (FSL). He batted .263 with 4 home runs, 20 runs batted in (RBIs), 17 doubles, and 11 triples.

=== Toronto Blue Jays ===
On July 29, 2010, Gose, along with J. A. Happ and Jonathan Villar, was traded to the Houston Astros in exchange for Roy Oswalt and $12 million. Immediately after, he was traded to the Toronto Blue Jays for first baseman Brett Wallace. The Blue Jays had attempted to acquire Gose from the Phillies before, including in the Roy Halladay trade. They assigned him to the Dunedin Blue Jays of the FSL.

Gose was ranked by MLB.com in 2011 as the Blue Jays fifth-best prospect in the organization. In 2011, he played for the New Hampshire Fisher Cats of the Double-A Eastern League (EL). The Fisher Cats were EL champions and Gose scored the winning run in the championship game. He broke Darin Mastroianni's record for stolen bases in one season, finishing with 70 stolen bases and getting caught 15 times. He also hit 15 home runs. During the 2011–12 offseason, he played in the Venezuelan Winter League, batting .182 in 18 games.

Prior to the 2012 season, he was ranked as the 39th-best prospect in baseball. Gose started the 2012 season with the Las Vegas 51s of the Triple-A Pacific Coast League. He was named to appear in the 2012 All-Star Futures Game. In Triple-A in 2012, Gose had a .286 average with 5 home runs, 21 doubles, 10 triples, and 43 runs batted in.

Gose played in 106 games in the 2013 season with the Buffalo Bisons in the International League, finishing with a .239 average, 3 home runs, and 27 RBIs in 393 at bats, along with 22 stolen bases in 35 attempts.

==== Major league career ====
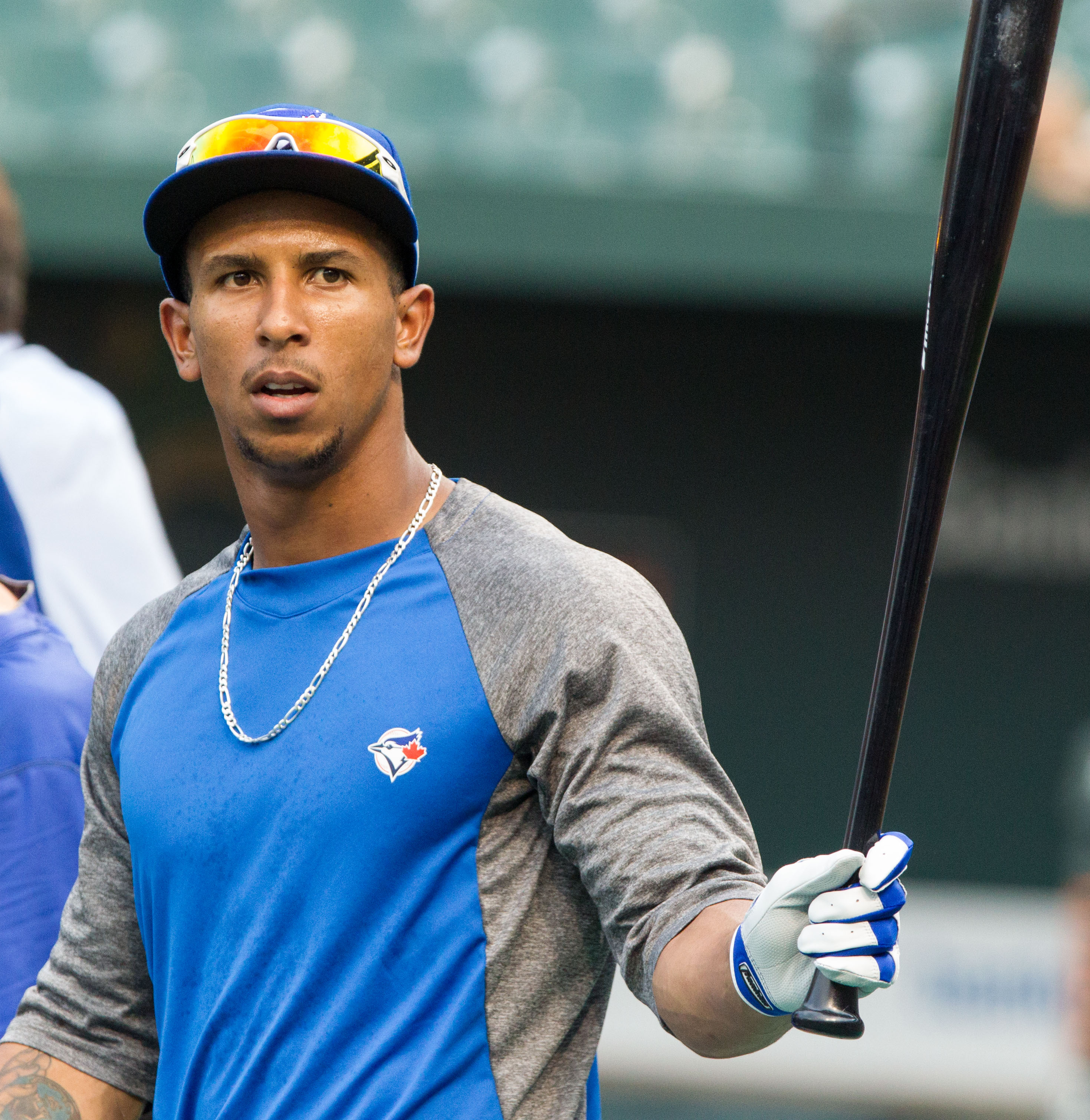
Gose with the Toronto Blue Jays in 2012

On July 17, 2012, Gose was called up to the Blue Jays to replace the injured José Bautista. Gose made his MLB debut that day against the New York Yankees. Gose collected his first major league hit on a bunt single in the ninth inning off Clay Rapada. Gose made his first major league start on July 18, playing right field and batting leadoff, going 0-for-3 with 2 strikeouts.

Gose was returned to Triple-A on August 25 when Brandon Morrow returned from the disabled list. Gose was recalled by the Jays on September 4 when major league rosters expanded and the Triple-A season ended. In a game on September 8, against the Boston Red Sox, Gose hit his first career home run, a three-run shot off reliever Andrew Bailey. Gose played in 56 games in the 2012 season, finishing with a .223 average, 1 home run, and 11 RBIs in 166 at bats, along with 15 stolen bases.

Gose was optioned to the Blue Jays' new Triple-A affiliate, the Buffalo Bisons, on March 25, 2013. He was recalled by the Blue Jays on May 20. Mickey Storey was optioned to make room on the 25-man roster for Gose. Gose was optioned back to the Bisons on June 6. He was recalled on August 16. Gose played in 52 games in the 2013 season, finishing with a .259 average, .283 on base percentage, 2 home runs, and 12 RBIs in 147 at bats, along with 4 stolen bases in 7 attempts.

Gose was optioned to the Bisons on March 24, 2014. He was up and down between Buffalo and Toronto for much of the 2014 season. After hitting .234 with one home run and 14 stolen bases in the majors, Gose was optioned back to Buffalo on August 15 to make room for the returning Edwin Encarnación. He was brought back to the Blue Jays on September 1, as a September call-up.

=== Detroit Tigers ===
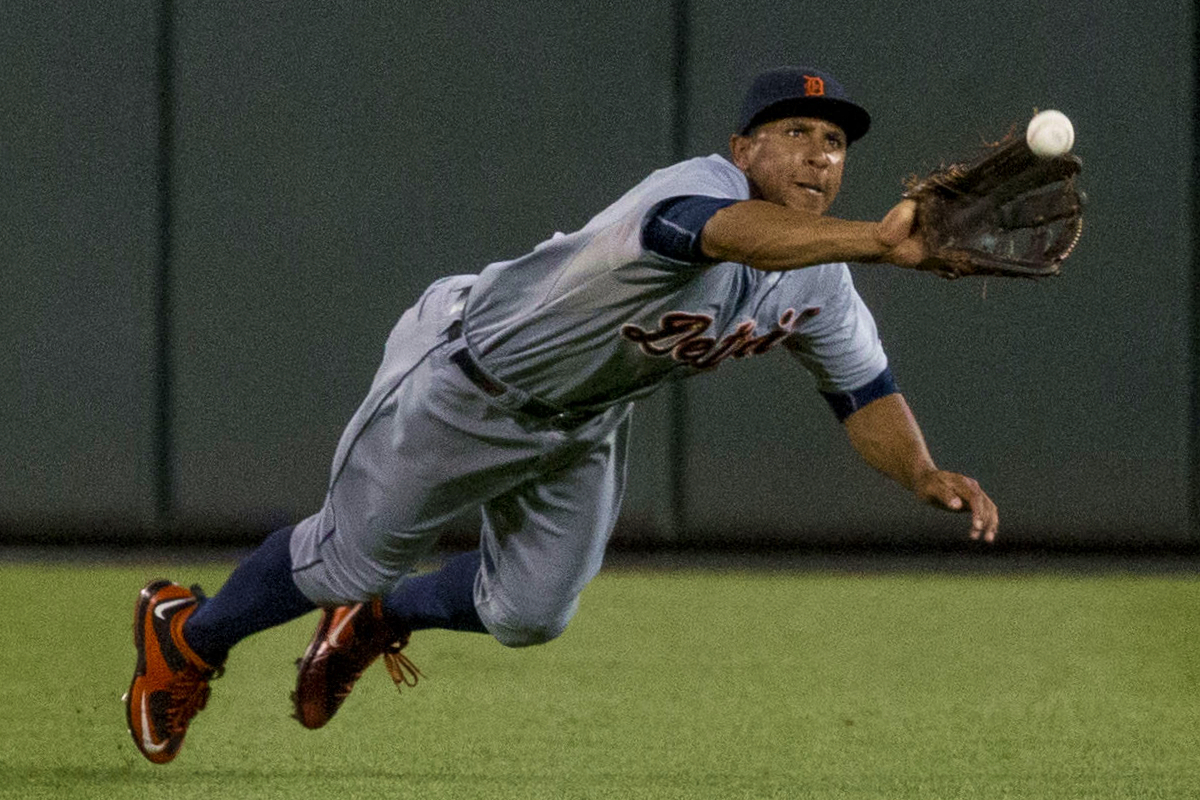
Gose playing the outfield for the Detroit Tigers in 2015

On November 12, 2014, Gose was traded to the Detroit Tigers for second baseman Devon Travis. In the 2015 season, he served as the Tigers primary centerfielder, playing in 140 games, and hit .254 with 23 stolen bases.

On May 16, 2016, Gose was optioned to the Triple-A Toledo Mud Hens. Prior to being sent down, Gose batted .209 with two home runs and seven RBIs in 30 games for Detroit. On July 9, Gose engaged in a dugout incident with Triple-A manager Lloyd McClendon. During the first game of a doubleheader, McClendon appeared to be giving "constructive criticism" to Gose, who responded in a negative fashion to these comments and allegedly swore at his manager. Gose was promptly sent home and did not play the remainder of the first game nor any of the second game. On July 10, Gose refused to show up for the game and had cleared out his locker.

On July 13, the Tigers decided they would demote Gose to their Double-A affiliate, the Erie SeaWolves, following a three-day suspension. "After collectively evaluating the situation in Toledo, we spoke with Anthony and emphasized our organization's expectations of him," said Tigers general manager Al Avila. "Most importantly, Anthony's transfer to Erie is a move to give him a fresh start to his overall performance as he works his way back to Detroit."

The Tigers designated Gose for assignment on January 18, 2017, to make room for Mikie Mahtook on the roster. On January 25, Gose cleared waivers and was outrighted to the Triple-A Toledo Mud Hens. On March 26, after sending Gose down to minor league camp, the Tigers announced that they would try to convert him into a pitcher after he came to them with the idea. Gose made his pitching debut on May 22 with the Lakeland Flying Tigers of the FSL, pitching an inning and reaching 99 miles per hour (159 km/h). He elected free agency following the season on November 6.

=== Texas Rangers ===
On November 30, 2017, Gose signed a minor league deal with the Texas Rangers. Two weeks later on December 14, the Houston Astros selected Gose in the Rule 5 draft. On March 5, 2018, Gose was placed on outright waivers by the Astros who then returned him to the Rangers, where he was assigned to Triple-A. He split the season between the High-A Down East Wood Ducks and Double-A Frisco RoughRiders. In 28 games out of the bullpen, he registered a 5.19 ERA with 24 strikeouts in 26.0 innings pitched. He declared free agency on October 5.

=== Cleveland Indians / Guardians ===
On December 8, 2018, Gose signed a minor-league contract with the Cleveland Indians. He spent the 2019 season split between the Double-A Akron RubberDucks and High-A Lynchburg Hillcats, accumulating a combined 2.48 ERA with 35 strikeouts and 4 saves in 29 innings of work across 32 relief appearances. Gose was invited to spring training the following season. He did not play in a game in 2020 due to the cancellation of the minor league season because of the COVID-19 pandemic. Gose became a free agent on November 2, 2020.

Gose signed a minor league contract with the Indians on November 17. The deal included an invitation to the Indians' 2021 major league spring training camp. Gose was assigned to the Indians' taxi squad to begin the 2021 season. On September 21, 2021, the Indians selected Gose to the 40-man roster, and promoted him to the major leagues for the first time as a pitcher. He made 6 appearances in his inaugural Cleveland campaign, posting a 1.35 ERA with 9 strikeouts in 6 2/3 innings pitched.

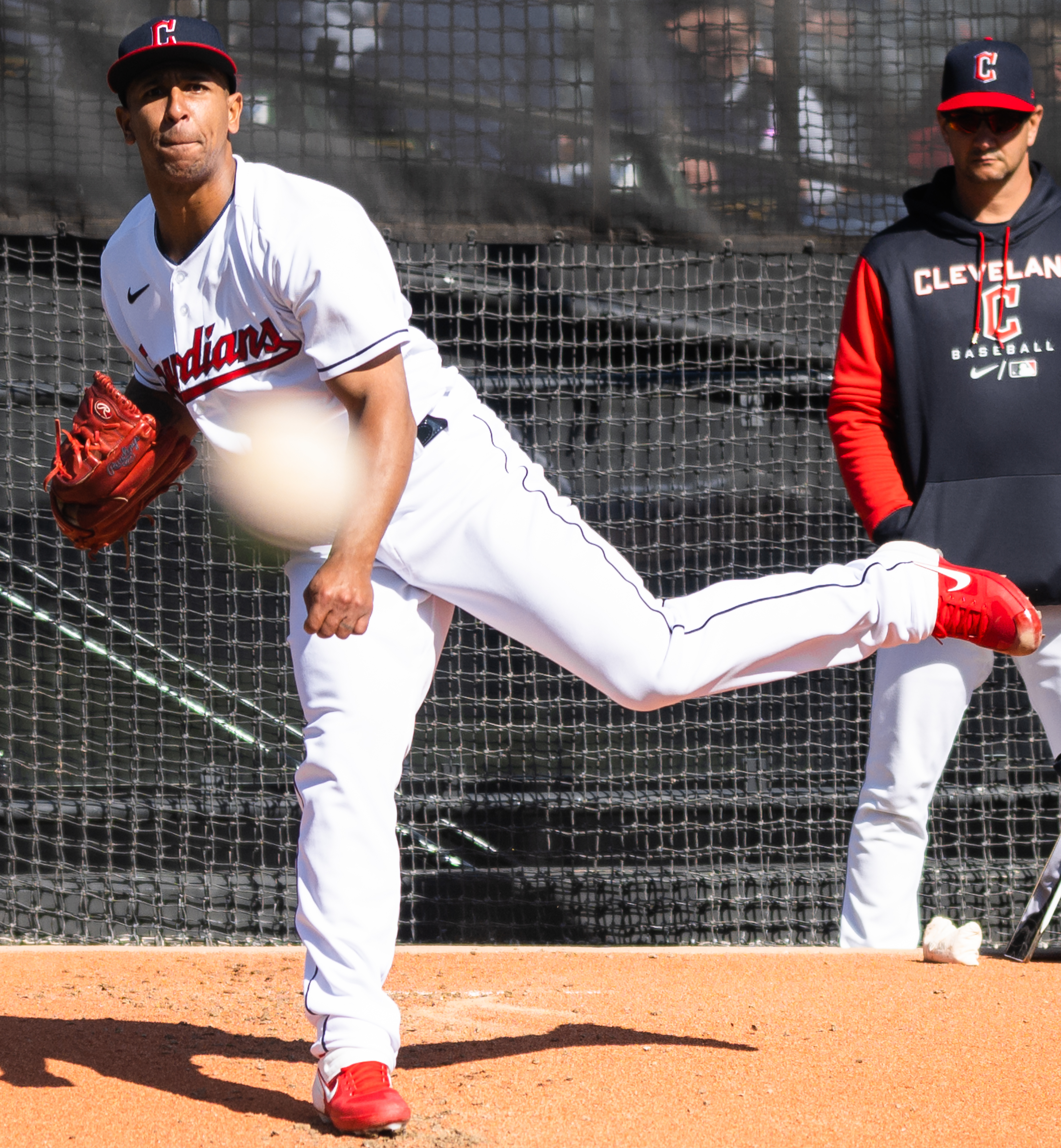
Gose with the Cleveland Guardians in 2022

In 2022, Gose made 22 appearances out of the Guardians' bullpen, registering a 3–0 record and 4.71 ERA with 28 strikeouts in 21 innings of work. On August 1, he was placed on the 60-day injured list with a strained left triceps. Gose underwent Tommy John surgery on September 14, ending his season and his 2023 season as well. Gose was designated for assignment by Cleveland on November 15. The Guardians declined to tender Gose a contract the non-tender deadline of November 18, 2022; Gose subsequently became a free agent. On December 1, the Guardians re-signed Gose to a two-year minor league contract while he recovered from surgery; the deal included an invitation to the Guardians' 2023 major league spring training camp.

Gose returned to action in 2024 with Triple-A Columbus, compiling a 5–4 record and 3.29 ERA with 55 strikeouts and 10 saves over 35 appearances. On August 6, the Guardians selected Gose's contract, adding him to their active roster. He made one appearance for Cleveland, allowing two runs in 1 1/3 innings of work against the Arizona Diamondbacks. Gose was designated for assignment by Cleveland on August 9. After clearing waivers, Gose was outrighted back to Columbus on August 12. The Guardians selected Gose's contract back to the active roster on August 19. Gose was designated for assignment once again by the Guardians on August 21. After clearing waivers, he rejected an outright assignment to the minor leagues, electing free agency instead on August 23, however he re-signed with the Guardians on a new minor league contract the next day. Gose was selected to the active roster for a third time on August 27. He allowed one run in two innings of work against the Kansas City Royals and was designated for assignment once more the next day. Gose cleared waivers and elected free agency again on August 30. The next day, he re-signed with Cleveland on a minor league contract. On September 8, Gose was selected back to the major league roster. He allowed two runs in one inning against the Los Angeles Dodgers and was designated for assignment the following day. Gose cleared waivers and accepted an outright assignment to Columbus on September 11. He elected free agency on October 2.

=== New York Mets ===
On December 20, 2024, Gose signed a minor league contract with the New York Mets. In 21 appearances for the Triple-A Syracuse Mets, he logged a 2–1 record and 4.30 ERA with 25 strikeouts and one save over 23 innings of work. The Mets released Gose on June 16.

=== Arizona Diamondbacks ===
On June 19, 2025, Gose signed a minor league contract with the Arizona Diamondbacks. In 14 appearances for the Triple-A Reno Aces, he posted an 0–3 record and 5.14 ERA with 16 strikeouts over 14 innings. Arizona released Gose on August 1.

=== Leones de Yucatán ===
On November 14, 2025, Gose signed with the Leones de Yucatán of the Mexican League. Gose made six appearances for Yucatán during the 2026 campaign, recording 15 strikeouts across 7 2/3 scoreless innings of relief.

=== Kansas City Royals ===
On April 27, 2026, Gose signed a minor league contract with the Kansas City Royals. In 39 appearances for the Triple–A Omaha Storm Chasers, he compiled a 2–3 record and 4.89 ERA with 58 strikeouts and one save over 46 innings of work. On August 27, the Royals selected Gose's contract, adding him to their active roster. On November 20, he was non-tendered and became a free agent.

== International career ==
In May 2021, Gose was named to the roster of the United States national team for qualifying for baseball at the 2020 Summer Olympics. After the team qualified, he was named to the Olympics roster on July 2. The team went on to finish second, losing to hosts Japan in the gold medal game. Gose was also on the roster for the 2024 WBSC Premier12.

== See also ==
- List of Olympic medalists in baseball
- Rule 5 draft results
