= Thad Weber =

American baseball player (born 1984)

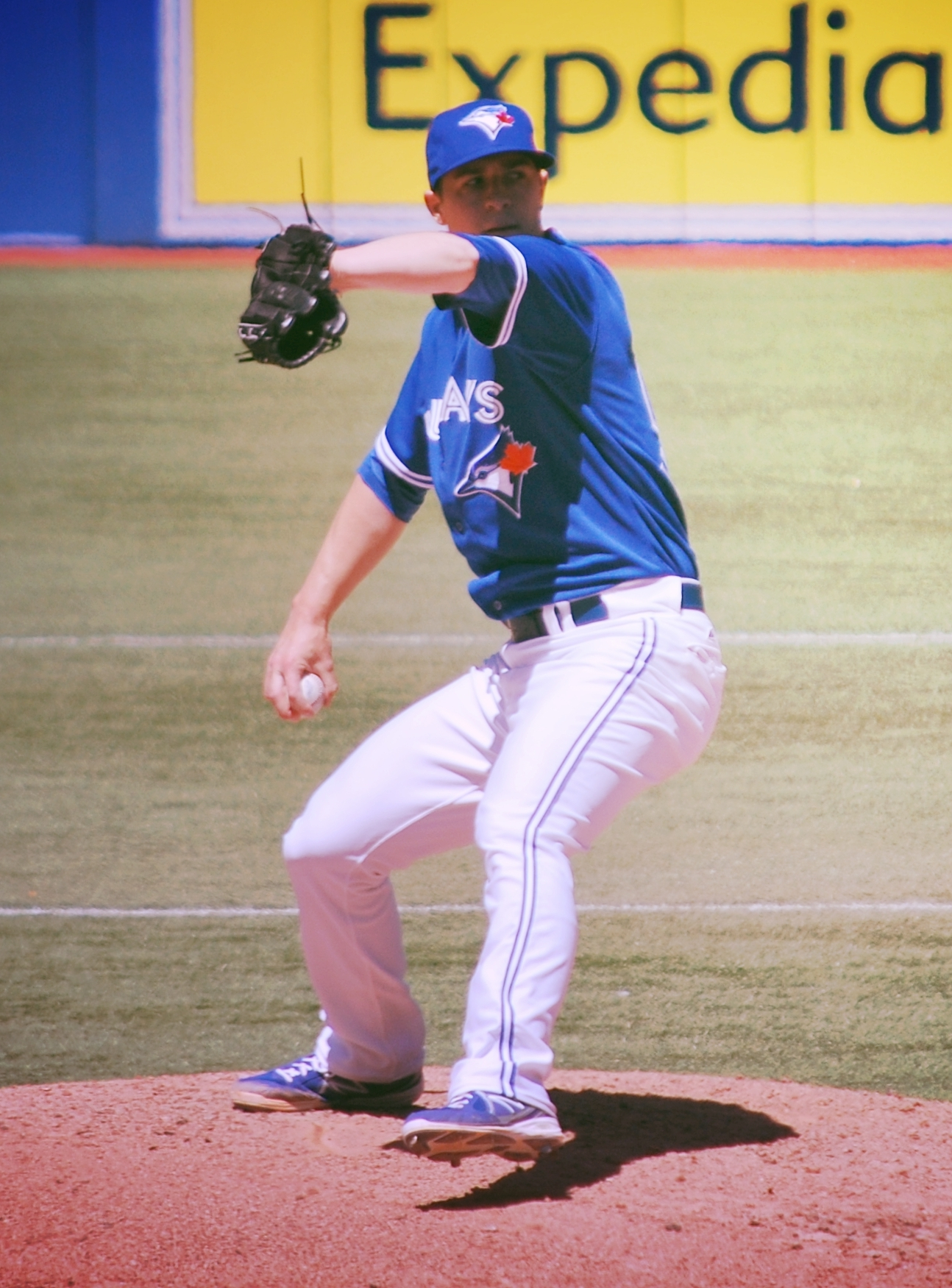
- Weber with the Toronto Blue Jays in 2013
- Pitcher
- Born: September 28, 1984 (age 42); Friend, Nebraska, U.S.
- Batted: Right Threw: Right

Professional debut
- MLB: April 22, 2012, for the Detroit Tigers
- KBO: April 3, 2014, for the NC Dinos

Last appearance
- MLB: August 20, 2013, for the Toronto Blue Jays
- KBO: October 14, 2014, for the NC Dinos

MLB statistics
- Win–loss record: 0–2
- Earned run average: 3.79
- Strikeouts: 11

KBO statistics
- Win–loss record: 9-6
- Earned run average: 4.58
- Strikeouts: 85
- Stats at Baseball Reference

Teams
- Detroit Tigers (2012); San Diego Padres (2013); Toronto Blue Jays (2013); NC Dinos (2014)

Thad George Weber (born September 28, 1984) is an American former professional baseball pitcher and current major league scout. He appeared in Major League Baseball (MLB) with the Detroit Tigers, San Diego Padres, and Toronto Blue Jays, as well as in the KBO League for the NC Dinos.

== Professional career ==
=== Detroit Tigers ===
On August 22, 2009, Weber tossed the Erie SeaWolves' first no-hitter in almost 14 years. Weber faced two batters over the minimum, struck out a career-high 10, and threw only 88 pitches en route to the historic achievement.

Weber was called up by the Detroit Tigers on April 21, 2012, and made his major league debut the next day against the Texas Rangers the Rangers won 3-2 in 11 innings. He was optioned back to the minor leagues by Detroit on April 26, after making two appearances.

=== San Diego Padres ===
On August 23, 2012, Weber was claimed off waivers by the San Diego Padres. He made three appearances for the Triple-A Tucson Padres, posting a 1-0 record and 4.42 ERA with 14 strikeouts across 18 1/3 innings pitched. On October 25, Weber was removed from the 40-man roster and sent outright to Tucson.

On April 12, 2013, the Padres selected Weber's contract, adding him back to their active roster. He made three appearances for San Diego, recording a 2.00 ERA with six strikeouts over nine innings of work. Weber was designated for assignment by the Padres on May 17.

=== Toronto Blue Jays ===
On May 19, 2013, the Toronto Blue Jays claimed Weber off waivers, and optioned him to the Triple-A Buffalo Bisons. Weber was recalled by the Blue Jays on May 25. Weber was optioned back to the Buffalo Bisons by the Blue Jays on May 28. He was recalled on June 9, and then returned to Buffalo after that day's game. On August 13, Weber was recalled again by the Blue Jays to replace Josh Johnson, who was placed on the 15-day disabled list. Weber was optioned back to Buffalo on August 19, but was expected to be activated as the 26th player for the team's doubleheader against the New York Yankees on August 20.

=== NC Dinos ===
On December 11, 2013, Weber was released by the Blue Jays and signed with the NC Dinos of the KBO League. Weber made 24 appearances (23 starts) for the Dinos during the 2014 season, compiling a 9-6 record and 4.58 ERA with 85 strikeouts over 118 innings of work.

=== Detroit Tigers (second stint) ===
On January 20, 2015, the Detroit Tigers signed Weber to a minor league contract. During the 2015 season, Weber started 27 games for the Toledo Mud Hens and had a 6–10 record with a 4.19 ERA and 105 strikeouts.

On December 11, 2015, Weber signed a minor-league contract with the Detroit Tigers. Weber spent the 2016 season shuffling between the Toledo Mud Hens and the Erie SeaWolves, Detroit's Triple–A and Double–A affiliates, and compiled an 8–13 record and 5.08 ERA with 78 strikeouts over 26 games (24 starts). He elected free agency following the season on November 7, 2016.

On January 10, 2017, Weber re–signed with Detroit on a new minor league contract. He was released by the Tigers organization on March 25.

=== Colorado Rockies ===
On May 12, 2017, Weber signed a minor league deal with the Colorado Rockies. He was released on October 31.

== Personal life ==
Weber has a degree in Biological Sciences, graduating on May 10, 2008.

Weber missed the UL-Lafayette series, as his wife Megan gave birth to their daughter, Babe, in 2008. He also has 2 sons, Gehrig, born in 2010, Teddy, born in 2013, and a daughter Wynn, born in 2019.
