= 2011 Toronto Blue Jays season =

2011 Toronto Blue Jays
- League: American League
- Division: East
- Ballpark: Rogers Centre
- City: Toronto, Ontario
- Record: 81–81 (.500)
- Divisional place: 4th
- Owners: Rogers; Paul Beeston (CEO)
- General managers: Alex Anthopoulos
- Managers: John Farrell
- Television: Rogers Sportsnet; Rogers Sportsnet One (Buck Martinez, Pat Tabler, Alan Ashby)
- Radio: Blue Jays Radio Network; FAN 590 (Jerry Howarth, Alan Ashby, Mike Wilner, Gregg Zaun)

The 2011 Toronto Blue Jays season was the 35th season of Major League Baseball's Toronto Blue Jays franchise, and the 22nd full season of play (23rd overall) at the Rogers Centre. It was also the first season with John Farrell as the team's manager. The Blue Jays had an up-and-down season, finishing with an 81–81 record, in fourth place in the American League East.

== Season standings ==
=== American League East ===
AL East
Team	W	L	Pct.	GB	Home	Road
New York Yankees	97	65	.599	—	52‍–‍29	45‍–‍36
Tampa Bay Rays	91	71	.562	6	47‍–‍34	44‍–‍37
Boston Red Sox	90	72	.556	7	45‍–‍36	45‍–‍36
Toronto Blue Jays	81	81	.500	16	42‍–‍39	39‍–‍42
Baltimore Orioles	69	93	.426	28	39‍–‍42	30‍–‍51

=== American League Wild Card ===
Division winners
Team	W	L	Pct.
New York Yankees	97	65	.599
Texas Rangers	96	66	.593
Detroit Tigers	95	67	.586

Wild Card team (Top team qualifies for postseason)
Team	W	L	Pct.	GB
Tampa Bay Rays	91	71	.562	—
Boston Red Sox	90	72	.556	1
Los Angeles Angels of Anaheim	86	76	.531	5
Toronto Blue Jays	81	81	.500	10
Cleveland Indians	80	82	.494	11
Chicago White Sox	79	83	.488	12
Oakland Athletics	74	88	.457	17
Kansas City Royals	71	91	.438	20
Baltimore Orioles	69	93	.426	22
Seattle Mariners	67	95	.414	24
Minnesota Twins	63	99	.389	28

== Records vs opponents ==
	Record			Games Left		
Opponent	Home	Road	Total	Home	Road	Total
AL East
Baltimore Orioles	6–3	6–3	12–6	–	–	–
Boston Red Sox	5–4	3–6	8–10	–	–	–
New York Yankees	5–4	2–7	7–11	–	–	–
Tampa Bay Rays	3–6	3–6	6–12	–	–	–
Totals	19–17	14–22	33–39	–	–	–
AL Central
Chicago White Sox	3–1	1–2	4–3	–	–	–
Cleveland Indians	1–2	3–1	4–3	–	–	–
Detroit Tigers	1–3	1–1	2–4	–	–	–
Kansas City Royals	1–2	2–2	3–4	–	–	–
Minnesota Twins	2–1	3–0	5–1	–	–	–
Totals	8–9	10–6	18–15	–	–	–
AL West
Los Angeles Angels	4–3	1–2	5–5	–	–	–
Oakland Athletics	3–3	2–2	5–5	–	–	–
Seattle Mariners	3–0	3–3	6–3	–	–	–
Texas Rangers	2–1	4–3	6–4	–	–	–
Totals	12–7	10–10	22–17	–	–	–
National League
Atlanta Braves	–	0–3	0–3	–	–	–
Cincinnati Reds	–	2–1	2–1	–	–	–
Houston Astros	1–2	–	1–2	–	–	–
Philadelphia Phillies	1–2	–	1–2	–	–	–
Pittsburgh Pirates	1–2	–	1–2	–	–	–
St. Louis Cardinals	–	3–0	3–0	–	–	–
Totals	3–6	5–4	8–10	–	–	–
Grand Totals	42–39	39–42	81–81	–	–	–

Month	Games	Won	Lost	Pct.
April	27	13	14	.481
May	28	15	13	.536
June	27	12	15	.444
July	26	15	11	.577
August	28	13	15	.464
September	26	13	13	.500
Totals	162	81	81	.500

2011 American League record Source: MLB Standings Grid – 2011
Team	BAL	BOS	CWS	CLE	DET	KC	LAA	MIN	NYY	OAK	SEA	TB	TEX	TOR	NL
Baltimore	–	8–10	4–4	2–5	5–5	5–4	3–6	6–2	5–13	4–5	4–2	9–9	1–5	6–12	7–11
Boston	10–8	–	2–4	4–6	5–1	5–3	6–2	5–2	12–6	6–2	5–4	6–12	4–6	10–8	10–8
Chicago	4–4	4–2	–	11–7	5–13	7–11	2–6	9–9	2–6	6–4	7–2	4–4	4–4	3–4	11–7
Cleveland	5–2	6–4	7–11	–	6–12	12–6	3–6	11–7	3–4	5–2	5–4	2–4	1–9	3–4	11–7
Detroit	5–5	1–5	13–5	12–6	–	11–7	3–4	14–4	4–3	5–5	4–6	6–1	6–3	4–2	7–11
Kansas City	4–5	3–5	11–7	6–12	7–11	–	7–3	8–10	3–3	4–5	5–3	2–5	2–6	4–3	5–13
Los Angeles	6–3	2–6	6–2	6–3	4–3	3–7	–	6–3	4–5	8–11	12–7	4–4	7–12	5–5	13–5
Minnesota	2–6	2–5	9–9	7–11	4–14	10–8	3–6	–	2–6	4–4	3–5	3–7	5–3	1–5	8–10
New York	13–5	6–12	6–2	4–3	3–4	3–3	5–4	6–2	–	6–3	5–4	9–9	7–2	11–7	13–5
Oakland	5–4	2–6	4–6	2–5	5–5	5–4	11–8	4–4	3–6	–	9–10	5–2	6–13	5–5	8–10
Seattle	2–4	4–5	2–7	4–5	6–4	3–5	7–12	5–3	4–5	10–9	–	4–6	4–15	3–6	9–9
Tampa Bay	9–9	12–6	4–4	4–2	1–6	5–2	4–4	7–3	9–9	2–5	6–4	–	4–5	12–6	12–6
Texas	5–1	6–4	4–4	9–1	3–6	6–2	12–7	3–5	2–7	13–6	15–4	5–4	–	4–6	9–9
Toronto	12–6	8–10	4–3	4–3	2–4	3–4	5–5	5–1	7–11	5–5	6–3	6–12	6–4	–	8–10

- Source: MLB Standings Grid – 2011

== Season summary ==
Following an unexpectedly successful 2010 season, one of the Blue Jays' priorities was to find a replacement for retiring manager Cito Gaston. After reviewing many candidates, the Blue Jays vetted four finalists, Sandy Alomar Jr., DeMarlo Hale, John Farrell and their third base coach Brian Butterfield. The Jays hired Farrell on October 22, 2010.

Relief pitcher Scott Downs declined arbitration, becoming a free agent; he signed with the Los Angeles Angels of Anaheim on December 10, 2010. Catcher John Buck was also expected to leave, as GM Alex Anthopoulos and several commentators noted that he deserved a full-time job and contract coming off an all-star season, but that the Jays would be looking to prospect J. P. Arencibia as their starting catcher, after he hit .301 with 32 home runs in 104 Triple-A games.

The Jays made several notable acquisitions through free agency, including relievers Jon Rauch and Octavio Dotel. On November 17, 2010, the Blue Jays traded for outfielder Rajai Davis from the Oakland Athletics in exchange for two minor league pitchers Trystan Magnuson and Danny Farquhar.

On January 21, the Blue Jays announced a blockbuster deal that sent the face of the franchise, Vernon Wells, to the Los Angeles Angels of Anaheim, in exchange for catcher/first baseman Mike Napoli and outfielder Juan Rivera. Four days later, the Blue Jays traded Napoli to the Texas Rangers for reliever Frank Francisco, Rivera was Designated for assignment by the Blue Jays on July 3, 2011, and acquired by the Los Angeles Dodgers with cash for a player to be named later or cash back.

On February 17, the Blue Jays announced that José Bautista had agreed to a five-year contract extension worth $64 million. Bautista led the MLB with 54 home runs, won the AL Hank Aaron Award and placed fourth in MVP balloting in 2010.

On June 1, in a game against the Cleveland Indians, Eric Thames, Rajai Davis and Jayson Nix hit back-to-back-to-back triples for the first time in franchise history. It was also the first time in the Major Leagues since Mike Gates, Tim Raines and Tim Wallach of the Montreal Expos accomplished this incredibly rare feat back in 1981.

On July 27, the Blue Jays completed a three-team trade to acquire long sought-after center fielder Colby Rasmus from the St. Louis Cardinals. In total, the trade involved many players, with Rasmus, P. J. Walters, Brian Tallet, and Trever Miller traded from St. Louis to Toronto, Mark Teahen traded from the Chicago White Sox to Toronto, Zach Stewart and Jason Frasor traded from Toronto to Chicago, Edwin Jackson traded to the St. Louis Cardinals from the Chicago White Sox (through Toronto), along with outfielder Corey Patterson, relief pitchers Octavio Dotel, and Marc Rzepczynski. The trade was seen as a watershed moment in the Blue Jays development process in the Anthopoulous regime, providing the team a multi-tooled centre fielder to anchor a young, developing outfield trio.

On July 31, the Blue Jays retired their first number, Roberto Alomar's #12.

On August 10, ESPN reported a cover story claiming the Toronto Blue Jays organization engaged in sign stealing from visiting teams at the Rogers Centre, during the 2010 season. The story, by Peter Keating and Amy K. Nelson, alleged that a man in white, sitting in the outfield crowd, was raising his arms above his head to indicate an off-speed pitch. While the story was not validated by visiting players, managers or other MLB organizations, the Blue Jays responded with a press conference to denounce the allegations.

On August 23, Aaron Hill and John McDonald were traded to the Arizona Diamondbacks in exchange for second baseman Kelly Johnson.

In August, J. P. Arencibia broke the Blue Jays single-season record for most home runs by a catcher, finishing the year with 23. Russell Martin would later tie this record in 2015.

== 2011 draft picks ==
The 2011 MLB draft was held on June 7–9.

Round	Pick	Player	Position	College/School	Nationality	Signed
1	21	Tyler Beede	RHP	Lawrence Academy (MA)	(United States)	Unsigned
C-A	35*	Jacob Anderson	RHP	Chino High School (CA)	(United States)	2011–08–12
C-A	46*	Joe Musgrove	RHP	Grossmont High School (CA)	(United States)	2011–06–22
C-A	53*	Dwight Smith Jr.	OF	McIntosh High School (GA)	(United States)	2011–08–14
C-A	57*	Kevin Comer	RHP	Seneca High School (NJ)	(United States)	2011–08–15
2	74*	Daniel Norris	LHP	Science Hill High School (TN)	(United States)	2011–08–15
2	78	Jeremy Gabryszwski	RHP	Crosby High School (TX)	(United States)	2011–07–27
3	108	John Stilson	RHP	Texas A&M	(United States)	2011–08–14
4	139	Tom Robson	RHP	Delta SS	(Canada)	2011–08–12
5	169	Andrew Chin	LHP	Buckingham Browne & Nichols (MA)	(United States)	Unsigned
6	199	Anthony DeSclafani	RHP	Florida	(United States)	2011–08–14
7	229	Christian Lopes	SS	Edison High School (CA)	(United States)	2011–08–15
8	259	Mark Biggs	RHP	Warren East High School (KY)	(United States)	2011–08–14
9	289	Andrew Suarez	LHP	Christopher Columbus High School (FL)	(United States)	Unsigned
10	319	Aaron Garza	RHP	Galveston Ball High School (TX)	(United States)	Unsigned

- * The Blue Jays received the 35th pick as compensation for loss of free agent Scott Downs
- * The Blue Jays received the 46th pick as compensation for loss of free agent John Buck
- * The Blue Jays received the 53rd pick as compensation for loss of free agent Miguel Olivo
- * The Blue Jays received the 57th pick as compensation for loss of free agent Kevin Gregg
- * The Blue Jays received the 74th pick as a compensation pick from the Los Angeles Angels of Anaheim for signing type-A free agent Scott Downs

== Roster ==
2011 Toronto Blue Jays
Roster
Pitchers: 37 Henderson Álvarez; 58 Chad Beck; 57 Shawn Camp; 34 Joel Carreño; 27 Brett Cecil; 29 Octavio Dotel; 4 Kyle Drabek; 49 Danny Farquhar; 50 Frank Francisco; 54 Jason Frasor; 44 Casey Janssen; 58 Wil Ledezma; 35 Rommie Lewis; 51 Jesse Litsch; 29 Dustin McGowan; 43 Trever Miller; 59 Brad Mills; 23 Brandon Morrow; 47 Luis Pérez; 25 David Purcey; 60 Jon Rauch; 37 Jo-Jo Reyes; 48 Scott Richmond; 24 Ricky Romero; 34 Marc Rzepczynski; 56 Zach Stewart; 56 Brian Tallet; 33 Carlos Villanueva; 40 P. J. Walters	Catchers: 9 J. P. Arencibia; 8 José Molina; Infielders: 40,30 David Cooper; 10 Edwin Encarnación; 5 Yunel Escobar; 2 Aaron Hill; 2 Kelly Johnson; 13 Brett Lawrie; 26 Adam Lind; 18 Mike McCoy; 6 John McDonald; 28 Jayson Nix; 20 Mark Teahen; 25 Chris Woodward	Outfielders: 19 José Bautista; 11 Rajai Davis; 39 Adam Loewen; 1 Darin Mastroianni; 16 Corey Patterson; 28 Colby Rasmus; 20 Juan Rivera; 45 Travis Snider; 46 Eric Thames; 3 DeWayne Wise	Manager: 52 John Farrell; Coaches: 61 Alex Andreopoulos (bullpen catcher); 55 Brian Butterfield (third base); 41 Pat Hentgen (bullpen); 7 Torey Lovullo (first base); 21 Dwayne Murphy (hitting); 63 Luis Rivera (coach); 22 Don Wakamatsu (bench); 53 Bruce Walton (pitching)

=== Top prospects ===
#	Player	Position	Top 100 Rank	Scouting Book	2011 Starting Team (Level)
1	Kyle Drabek	Right-handed pitcher	29	15	Toronto Blue Jays (MLB)
2	Deck McGuire	Right-handed pitcher	95	53	Dunedin Blue Jays (Advanced-A)
3	Anthony Gose	Outfielder	-	133	New Hampshire Fisher Cats (AA)
4	Travis d'Arnaud	Catcher	36	102	New Hampshire Fisher Cats (AA)
5	Zach Stewart	Right-handed pitcher	-	101	New Hampshire Fisher Cats (AA)
6	Asher Wojciechowski	Right-handed pitcher	-	193	Dunedin Blue Jays (Advanced-A)
7	J. P. Arencibia	Catcher	-	88	Toronto Blue Jays (MLB)
8	Carlos Perez	Catcher	-	-	Lansing Lugnuts (A)
9	Aaron Sanchez	Right-handed pitcher	-	-	Bluefield Blue Jays (rookie)
10	Jake Marisnick	Outfielder	-	-	Lansing Lugnuts (A)
11	Brett Lawrie	Second baseman	40	16	Las Vegas 51s (AAA)

* According to Baseball America Top 100 Prospects

* According to Scouting Book Top Minor League Prospects

* Top 10 Blue Jays prospects via Baseball America

== Game log ==
=== Regular season ===
Legend
Blue Jays Win	Blue Jays Loss	Game postponed

2011 Game Log
April 13–14 (Home 6–5, Road 7–9)

#	Date	Opponent	Score	Win	Loss	Save	Attendance	Record	GB
1	April 1	Twins	13–3	Romero (1–0)	Pavano (0–1)		47,984	1–0	–
2	April 2	Twins	6–1	Drabek (1–0)	Liriano (0–1)		27,194	2–0	–
3	April 3	Twins	3–4	Blackburn (1–0)	Cecil (0–1)	Nathan (1)	35,505	2–1	1
4	April 5	Athletics	7–6 (10)	Frasor (1–0)	Balfour (0–1)		11,077	3–1	1
5	April 6	Athletics	5–3	Litsch (1–0)	Braden (0–1)	Rauch (1)	11,684	4–1	–
6	April 7	Athletics	1–2	Cahill (1–0)	Frasor (1–1)	Fuentes (1)	19,528	4–2	1
7	April 8	@ Angels	3–2	Dotel (1–0)	Santana (0–1)	Rauch (2)	43,853	5–2	½
8	April 9	@ Angels	5–6 (14)	Haren (2–0)	Rauch (0–1)		43,513	5–3	1
9	April 10	@ Angels	1–3	Weaver (3–0)	Reyes (0–1)	Rodney (2)	43,525	5–4	1
10	April 11	@ Mariners	7–8	Lueke (1–0)	Camp (0–1)		13,056	5–5	1½
11	April 12	@ Mariners	2–3	Pineda (1–1)	Romero (1–1)	League (2)	15,500	5–6	2
12	April 13	@ Mariners	8–3	Rzepczynski (1–0)	Ray (1–1)		12,407	6–6	1
13	April 15	@ Red Sox	7–6	Cecil (1–1)	Jenks (0–1)	Rauch (3)	37,467	7–6	½
14	April 16	@ Red Sox	1–4	Beckett (2–1)	Reyes (0–2)	Papelbon (2)	37,310	7–7	1½
15	April 17	@ Red Sox	1–8	Lester (1–1)	Litsch (1–1)		37,802	7–8	2½
16	April 18	@ Red Sox	1–9	Matsuzaka (1–2)	Romero (1–2)		37,916	7–9	3
17	April 19	Yankees	6–5 (10)	Rauch (1–1)	Nova (1–2)		25,250	8–9	2
18	April 20	Yankees	2–6	Colón (1–1)	Cecil (1–2)	Soriano (1)	26,062	8–10	3
19	April 22	Rays	6–4 (11)	Rzepczynski (2–0)	Russell (1–1)		23,129	9–10	2½
20	April 23	Rays	4–6	Price (3–2)	Morrow (0–1)	Farnsworth (5)	21,826	9–11	3½
21	April 24	Rays	0–2	Shields (2–1)	Romero (1–3)		14,456	9–12	4½
22	April 25	@ Rangers	6–4	Drabek (2–0)	Lewis (1–3)	Rauch (4)	22,915	10–12	3½
23	April 26	@ Rangers	10–3	Litsch (2–1)	Harrison (3–2)		21,755	11–12	2½
24	April 27	@ Rangers	6–7	Eppley (1–0)	Dotel (1–1)	Oliver (2)	29,322	11–13	3½
25	April 28	@ Rangers	5–2	Francisco (1–0)	Oliver (1–2)		24,121	12–13	3½
26	April 29	@ Yankees	5–3	Romero (2–3)	García (1–1)	Rauch (5)	40,830	13–13	2½
27	April 30	@ Yankees	4–5	Burnett (4–1)	Drabek (2–1)	Rivera (9)	42,460	13–14	3½

May 15–13 (Home 9–8, Road 6–5)

#	Date	Opponent	Score	Win	Loss	Save	Attendance	Record	GB
28	May 1	@ Yankees	2–5	Nova (2–2)	Litsch (2–2)	Rivera (10)	43,363	13–15	4½
29	May 3	@ Rays	2–3	Farnsworth (2–0)	Rauch (1–2)		10,248	13–16	5
30	May 4	@ Rays	3–2	Morrow (1–1)	Niemann (1–4)	Francisco (1)	10,099	14–16	4
31	May 5	@ Rays	1–3	Price (4–3)	Drabek (2–2)	Farnsworth (6)	12,682	14–17	4
32	May 6	Tigers	7–4	Litsch (3–2)	Coke (1–5)	Francisco (2)	19,711	15–17	4
33	May 7	Tigers	0–9	Verlander (3–3)	Romero (2–4)		23,453	15–18	4
34	May 8	Tigers	2–5	Penny (3–3)	Reyes (0–3)	Valverde (7)	17,392	15–19	5
35	May 9	Tigers	5–10	Scherzer (6–0)	Morrow (1–2)		11,785	15–20	5½
36	May 10	Red Sox	7–6 (10)	Villanueva (1–0)	Albers (0–1)		17,820	16–20	5½
37	May 11	Red Sox	9–3	Litsch (4–2)	Lackey (2–5)		19,163	17–20	4½
38	May 13	@ Twins	2–0	Romero (3–4)	Burnett (0–2)	Francisco (3)	38,809	18–20	5
39	May 14	@ Twins	9–3 (11)	Rauch (2–2)	Perkins (0–1)		39,934	19–20	4
40	May 15	@ Twins	11–3	Morrow (2–2)	Duensing (2–3)		39,301	20–20	3
41	May 16	@ Tigers	4–2	Drabek (3–2)	Benoit (1–3)	Francisco (4)	20,444	21–20	3
–	May 17	@ Tigers	Postponed (rain) Rescheduled for June 27						2½
42	May 18	Rays	5–6	Hellickson (5–2)	Litsch (4–3)	Farnsworth (9)	14,415	21–21	3½
43	May 19	Rays	3–2	Romero (4–4)	Davis (4–4)	Francisco (5)	12,590	22–21	2½
44	May 20	Astros	2–5	López (1–1)	Francisco (1–1)	Melancon (2)	15,478	22–22	2½
45	May 21	Astros	7–5	Janssen (1–0)	Myers (1–4)	Dotel (1)	21,494	23–22	1½
46	May 22	Astros	2–3	Rodríguez (3–3)	Drabek (3–3)	Melancon (3)	19,487	23–23	2½
47	May 23	@ Yankees	7–3	Villanueva (2–0)	Colón (2–3)		41,946	24–23	1½
48	May 24	@ Yankees	4–5	Sabathia (5–3)	Francisco (1–2)		41,549	24–24	2½
49	May 25	@ Yankees	3–7	García (3–4)	Reyes (0–4)		43,201	24–25	3½
50	May 26	White Sox	1–3	Crain (2–1)	Rzepczynski (2–1)	Santos (8)	14,353	24–26	4
51	May 27	White Sox	4–2	Janssen (2–0)	Buehrle (4–4)	Rauch (6)	16,668	25–26	4
52	May 28	White Sox	9–8 (14)	Pérez (1–0)	Floyd (5–5)		22,659	26–26	3½
53	May 29	White Sox	13–4	Romero (5–4)	Danks (0–8)		18,325	27–26	3
54	May 30	Indians	11–1	Reyes (1–4)	Carmona (3–6)		12,902	28–26	2
55	May 31	Indians	3–6	Talbot (2–1)	Morrow (2–3)		14,556	28–27	2½

June 12–15 (Home 3–7, Road 9–8)

#	Date	Opponent	Score	Win	Loss	Save	Attendance	Record	GB
56	June 1	Indians	9–13	Tomlin (7–2)	Drabek (3–4)		15,397	28–28	3½
57	June 3	@ Orioles	8–4	Villanueva (3–0)	Britton (5–4)		18,587	29–28	3
58	June 4	@ Orioles	3–5	Arrieta (7–3)	Romero (5–5)	Gregg (10)	20,086	29–29	4
59	June 5	@ Orioles	7–4	Reyes (2–4)	Guthrie (2–8)		25,431	30–29	4
60	June 6	@ Royals	2–3 (11)	Soria (4–3)	Francisco (1–3)		12,194	30–30	4½
61	June 7	@ Royals	8–5	Drabek (4–4)	Mazzaro (0–1)	Rauch (7)	16,539	31–30	3½
62	June 8	@ Royals	9–8	Villanueva (4–0)	Duffy (0–2)	Janssen (1)	12,152	32–30	3½
63	June 9	@ Royals	2–3	Hochevar (4–6)	Romero (5–6)	Soria (8)	13,941	32–31	4½
64	June 10	Red Sox	1–5	Buchholz (5–3)	Reyes (2–5)		28,588	32–32	5½
65	June 11	Red Sox	4–16	Lackey (4–5)	Morrow (2–4)		39,437	32–33	6½
66	June 12	Red Sox	1–14	Lester (9–2)	Drabek (4–5)		30,364	32–34	7½
67	June 14	Orioles	6–5 (11)	Camp (1–1)	Uehara (1–1)		15,592	33–34	6½
68	June 15	Orioles	4–1	Romero (6–6)	Arrieta (8–4)	Francisco (6)	14,541	34–34	6½
69	June 16	Orioles	3–4	Berken (1–2)	Rauch (2–3)	Gregg (13)	31,822	34–35	7½
70	June 17	@ Reds	3–2	Reyes (3–5)	Leake (6–3)	Francisco (7)	32,026	35–35	7½
71	June 18	@ Reds	4–0	Morrow (3–4)	Vólquez (4–3)		31,688	36–35	6½
72	June 19	@ Reds	1–2	Arroyo (6–6)	Villanueva (4–1)	Cordero (5)	32,618	36–36	7½
73	June 20	@ Braves	0–2	Hudson (6–6)	Romero (6–7)	Kimbrel (20)	22,937	36–37	8½
74	June 21	@ Braves	1–5	Minor (1–2)	Stewart (0–1)		26,849	36–38	8½
75	June 22	@ Braves	1–5	Beachy (2–1)	Reyes (3–6)		23,152	36–39	8½
76	June 24	@ Cardinals	5–4	Frasor (2–1)	Salas (4–2)	Francisco (8)	37,724	37–39	7½
77	June 25	@ Cardinals	6–3	Villanueva (5–1)	García (6–3)		40,289	38–39	7
78	June 26	@ Cardinals	5–0	Romero (7–7)	McClellan (6–4)		36,542	39–39	7
79	June 27	@ Tigers	2–4	Benoit (2–3)	Rzepczynski (2–2)	Valverde (18)	25,181	39–40	7½
80	June 28	Pirates	6–7	Correia (10–6)	Reyes (3–7)	Hanrahan (23)	17,085	39–41	8½
81	June 29	Pirates	2–1	Morrow (4–4)	Maholm (4–9)	Francisco (9)	15,632	40–41	8½
82	June 30	Pirates	2–6	Karstens (6–4)	Cecil (1–3)		14,939	40–42	9½

July 15–11 (Home 10–6, Road 5–5)

#	Date	Opponent	Score	Win	Loss	Save	Attendance	Record	GB
83	July 1	Phillies	6–7	Báez (2–3)	Francisco (1–4)	Bastardo (4)	45,512	40–43	10½
84	July 2	Phillies	3–5	Halladay (11–3)	Pérez (1–1)		44,078	40–44	11½
85	July 3	Phillies	7–4	Dotel (2–1)	Lee (9–6)		26,204	41–44	10½
86	July 4	@ Red Sox	9–7	Morrow (5–4)	Lackey (5–8)	Francisco (10)	38,072	42–44	9½
87	July 5	@ Red Sox	2–3	Albers (3–3)	Cecil (1–4)	Papelbon (18)	37,745	42–45	10½
88	July 6	@ Red Sox	4–6	Wakefield (5–3)	Romero (7–8)	Papelbon (19)	37,404	42–46	10½
89	July 7	@ Indians	4–5	Sipp (4–1)	Pérez (1–2)		18,816	42–47	11
90	July 8	@ Indians	11–7	Reyes (4–7)	Talbot (2–5)		25,835	43–47	11
91	July 9	@ Indians	5–4 (10)	Rauch (3–3)	Perez (2–4)	Camp (1)	27,661	44–47	11
92	July 10	@ Indians	7–1	Cecil (2–4)	Carrasco (8–6)		21,148	45–47	11
93	July 14	Yankees	16–7	Reyes (5–7)	Colón (6–5)		37,342	46–47	10½
94	July 15	Yankees	7–1	Morrow (6–4)	García (7–7)		33,525	47–47	9½
95	July 16	Yankees	1–4	Sabathia (14–4)	Romero (7–9)	Rivera (23)	45,606	47–48	10½
96	July 17	Yankees	2–7	Hughes (1–2)	Villanueva (5–2)		36,586	47–49	11½
97	July 19	Mariners	6–5 (14)	Janssen (3–0)	Wright (2–3)		15,957	48–49	11
98	July 20	Mariners	11–6	Morrow (7–4)	Vargas (6–8)		18,093	49–49	11
99	July 21	Mariners	7–5	Rauch (4–3)	Pauley (5–4)		23,146	50–49	10½
100	July 22	@ Rangers	2–12	Lewis (10–7)	Reyes (5–8)		37,360	50–50	11½
101	July 23	@ Rangers	4–5	Oliver (3–5)	Rzepczynski (2–3)		38,537	50–51	12½
102	July 24	@ Rangers	3–0	Cecil (3–4)	Ogando (10–4)		43,117	51–51	12½
103	July 26	Orioles	4–12	Arrieta (10–7)	Morrow (7–5)		17,477	51–52	13
104	July 27	Orioles	3–0	Romero (8–9)	Simón (2–4)	Rauch (8)	16,861	52–52	13
105	July 28	Orioles	8–5	Villanueva (6–2)	Bergesen (2–7)		16,152	53–52	12
106	July 29	Rangers	3–2	Cecil (4–4)	Ogando (10–5)	Rauch (9)	19,287	54–52	11
107	July 30	Rangers	0–3	Holland (10–4)	Mills (0–1)		22,560	54–53	12
108	July 31	Rangers	7–3	Morrow (8–5)	Wilson (10–4)		45,629	55–53	12

August 13–15 (Home 5–8, Road 8–7)

#	Date	Opponent	Score	Win	Loss	Save	Attendance	Record	GB
109	August 2	@ Rays	3–1	Romero (9–9)	Price (9–10)	Rauch (10)	13,333	56–53	11½
110	August 3	@ Rays	1–9	Shields (10–9)	Villanueva (6–3)		11,803	56–54	12½
111	August 4	@ Rays	6–7	Gomes (1–1)	Camp (1–2)		28,491	56–55	12½
112	August 5	@ Orioles	5–4	Mills (1–1)	Hunter (1–2)	Rauch (11)	18,770	57–55	12½
113	August 6	@ Orioles	2–6	Tillman (3–4)	Morrow (8–6)		19,396	57–56	12½
114	August 7	@ Orioles	7–2	Romero (10–9)	Simón (3–5)		13,824	58–56	12½
115	August 9	Athletics	1–4	Harden (3–2)	Cecil (4–5)	Bailey (14)	20,521	58–57	14
116	August 10	Athletics	8–4	Janssen (4–0)	González (9–10)	Litsch (1)	19,541	59–57	13
117	August 11	Athletics	3–10	Moscoso (5–6)	Mills (1–2)		27,918	59–58	13½
118	August 12	Angels	1–5	Santana (9–8)	Morrow (8–7)		24,731	59–59	14½
119	August 13	Angels	11–2	Romero (11–9)	Weaver (14–6)		27,185	60–59	13½
120	August 14	Angels	5–4 (10)	Rauch (5–3)	Rodney (2–5)		23,355	61–59	12½
121	August 15	@ Mariners	5–6	Wilhelmsen (1–0)	Rauch (5–4)	League (30)	28,530	61–60	13
122	August 16	@ Mariners	13–7	Pérez (2–2)	Vargas (7–11)		23,089	62–60	13
123	August 17	@ Mariners	5–1	Morrow (9–7)	Beavan (3–4)		26,579	63–60	12
124	August 18	@ Athletics	7–0	Romero (12–9)	Cahill (9–12)		12,220	64–60	12
125	August 19	@ Athletics	0–2	Harden (4–2)	Cecil (4–6)	Bailey (16)	13,174	64–61	13
126	August 20	@ Athletics	1–5	González (10–11)	Álvarez (0–1)		28,434	64–62	13
127	August 21	@ Athletics	1–0	Pérez (3–2)	Moscoso (6–7)	Janssen (2)	16,811	65–62	13
128	August 23	Royals	4–6	Chen (9–5)	Morrow (9–8)	Soria (23)	20,009	65–63	13
129	August 24	Royals	4–3	Litsch (5–3)	Coleman (1–3)	Francisco (11)	18,292	66–63	13
130	August 25	Royals	6–9	Francis (5–14)	Cecil (4–7)		17,355	66–64	14
131	August 26	Rays	1–6	Shields (12–10)	Álvarez (0–2)		20,491	66–65	14
132	August 27	Rays	5–6	Niemann (9–5)	Camp (1–3)	Peralta (2)	24,052	66–66	15½
133	August 28	Rays	0–12	Price (12–11)	Morrow (9–9)		21,618	66–67	16
134	August 29	Rays	7–3	Romero (13–9)	Davis (8–8)		19,725	67–67	15½
135	August 30	@ Orioles	5–6 (10)	Eyre (1–0)	Tallet (0–2)		10,756	67–68	15½
136	August 31	@ Orioles	13–0	Álvarez (1–2)	Reyes (7–11)		14,211	68–68	15½

September 13–13 (Home 9–5, Road 4–8)

#	Date	Opponent	Score	Win	Loss	Save	Attendance	Record	GB
137	September 1	@ Orioles	8–6	Camp (2–3)	Eyre (1–1)	Francisco (12)	11,617	69–68	14½
138	September 2	@ Yankees	2–3	Nova (15–4)	Morrow (9–10)	Rivera (37)	47,240	69–69	15
139	September 3	@ Yankees	4–6	Logan (5–2)	Romero (13–10)	Robertson (1)	47,744	69–70	16
140	September 4	@ Yankees	3–9	Sabathia (19–7)	Cecil (4–8)		47,464	69–71	17
141	September 5	Red Sox	1–0 (11)	Camp (3–3)	Wheeler (2–2)		27,573	70–71	17
142	September 6	Red Sox	0–14	Lester (15–6)	Pérez (3–3)		17,565	70–72	18
143	September 7	Red Sox	11–10	Camp (4–3)	Bard (2–6)	Francisco (13)	16,154	71–72	17
144	September 8	Red Sox	7–4	Romero (14–10)	Miller (6–3)		17,189	72–72	16
145	September 9	Orioles	0–2	Guthrie (7–17)	Cecil (4–9)	Johnson (4)	13,918	72–73	16
146	September 10	Orioles	5–4	Litsch (6–3)	Gregg (0–3)		17,742	73–73	15
147	September 11	Orioles	6–5	Carreño (1–0)	Hunter (3–4)	Francisco (14)	14,235	74–73	15
148	September 13	@ Red Sox	6–18	Wakefield (7–6)	Morrow (9–11)		38,020	74–74	16½
149	September 14	@ Red Sox	5–4	Romero (15–10)	Bard (2–8)	Francisco (15)	37,087	75–74	15½
150	September 16	Yankees	5–4	Janssen (5–0)	Logan (5–3)		29,323	76–74	14½
151	September 17	Yankees	6–7	Laffey (3–2)	Villaneuva (6–4)	Rivera (42)	39,288	76–75	15½
152	September 18	Yankees	3–0	Morrow (10–11)	García (11–8)	Francisco (16)	34,657	77–75	14½
153	September 19	Angels	3–2 (10)	Janssen (6–0)	Downs (6–3)		11,178	78–75	14½
154	September 20	Angels	6–10	Piñiero (7–7)	Cecil (4–10)	Downs (1)	13,514	78–76	15½
155	September 21	Angels	2–7	Haren (16–9)	McGowan (0–1)		14,784	78–77	17
156	September 22	Angels	4–3 (12)	Camp (5–3)	Richards (0–2)		22,769	79–77	16
157	September 23	@ Rays	5–1	Morrow (11–11)	Price (12–13)		18,093	80–77	15½
158	September 24	@ Rays	2–6	Torres (1–1)	Romero (15–11)		27,773	80–78	16½
159	September 25	@ Rays	2–5	Davis (11–10)	Cecil (4–11)	Peralta (6)	21,008	80–79	17
160	September 26	@ White Sox	3–4	Axelrod (1–0)	McGowan (0–2)	Santos (30)	21,320	80–80	17
161	September 27	@ White Sox	1–2	Buehrle (13–9)	Álvarez (1–3)	Sale (3)	23,934	80–81	17
162	September 28	@ White Sox	3–2	Camp (6–3)	Sale (2–2)	Francisco (17)	20,524	81–81	16

== Player stats ==
=== Batting ===
Note: G = Games played; AB = At bats; R = Runs; H = Hits; 2B = Doubles; 3B = Triples; HR = Home runs; RBI = Runs batted in; SB = Stolen bases; BB = Walks; AVG = Batting average; SLG = Slugging average

Player	G	AB	R	H	2B	3B	HR	RBI	SB	BB	AVG	SLG
José Bautista	149	513	105	155	24	2	43	103	9	132	.302	.608
Yunel Escobar	133	513	77	149	24	3	11	48	3	61	.290	.413
Adam Lind	125	499	56	125	16	0	26	87	1	32	.251	.439
Edwin Encarnación	134	481	70	131	36	0	17	55	8	43	.272	.453
J.P. Arencibia	129	443	47	97	20	4	23	78	1	36	.219	.438
Aaron Hill	104	396	38	89	15	1	6	45	16	23	.225	.313
Eric Thames	95	362	58	95	24	5	12	37	2	23	.262	.456
Rajai Davis	95	320	44	76	21	6	1	29	34	15	.238	.350
Corey Patterson	89	317	44	80	16	3	6	33	13	15	.252	.379
Juan Rivera	70	247	22	60	11	0	6	28	3	22	.243	.360
Mike McCoy	80	197	26	39	8	0	2	10	12	25	.198	.269
Travis Snider	49	187	23	42	14	0	3	30	9	11	.225	.348
José Molina	55	171	19	48	12	1	3	15	2	15	.281	.415
John McDonald	65	168	19	42	8	1	2	20	2	8	.250	.345
Brett Lawrie	43	150	26	44	8	4	9	25	7	16	.293	.580
Jayson Nix	46	136	15	23	5	1	4	16	4	12	.169	.309
Colby Rasmus	35	133	14	23	10	0	3	13	0	5	.173	.316
Kelly Johnson	33	115	16	31	4	2	3	9	3	16	.270	.417
David Cooper	27	71	9	15	7	0	2	12	0	7	.211	.394
Mark Teahen	27	42	3	8	1	0	1	3	0	4	.190	.286
Adam Loewen	14	32	4	6	1	0	1	4	0	3	.188	.313
DeWayne Wise	20	32	4	4	0	1	2	2	2	0	.125	.375
Chris Woodward	11	10	3	0	0	0	0	0	0	0	.000	.000
Darin Mastroianni	1	2	0	0	0	0	0	0	0	0	.000	.000
Pitcher totals	162	22	1	2	0	0	0	2	0	1	.091	.091
Team totals	162	5559	743	1384	285	34	186	704	131	525	.249	.413

=== Pitching ===
Note: W = Wins; L = Losses; ERA = Earned run average; G = Games pitched; GS = Games started; SV = Saves; IP = Innings pitched; H = Hits allowed; R = Runs allowed; ER = Earned runs allowed; BB = Walks allowed; SO = Strikeouts

Player	W	L	ERA	G	GS	SV	IP	H	R	ER	BB	SO
Ricky Romero	15	11	2.92	32	32	0	225.0	176	85	73	80	178
Brandon Morrow	11	11	4.72	30	30	0	179.1	162	103	94	69	203
Brett Cecil	4	11	4.73	20	20	0	123.2	122	68	65	42	87
Jo-Jo Reyes	5	8	5.40	20	20	0	110.0	140	78	66	35	64
Carlos Villanueva	6	4	4.04	33	13	0	107.0	103	49	48	32	68
Kyle Drabek	4	5	6.06	18	14	0	78.2	87	54	53	55	51
Jesse Litsch	6	3	4.44	28	8	1	75.0	69	40	37	28	66
Shawn Camp	6	3	4.21	67	0	1	66.1	79	36	31	22	32
Luis Pérez	3	3	5.12	37	4	0	65.0	74	40	37	27	54
Henderson Álvarez	1	3	3.53	10	10	0	63.2	64	26	25	8	40
Jon Rauch	5	4	4.85	53	0	11	52.0	56	28	28	14	36
Casey Janssen	6	0	2.26	55	0	2	55.2	47	14	14	14	53
Frank Francisco	1	4	3.55	54	0	17	50.2	49	21	20	18	53
Jason Frasor	2	1	2.98	44	0	0	42.1	38	15	14	15	37
Marc Rzepczynski	2	3	2.97	43	0	0	39.1	28	16	13	15	33
Octavio Dotel	2	1	3.68	36	0	1	29.1	20	13	12	12	30
Dustin McGowan	0	2	6.43	5	4	0	21.0	20	15	15	13	20
Brad Mills	1	2	9.82	5	4	0	18.1	23	20	20	12	18
Zach Stewart	0	1	4.86	3	3	0	16.2	26	9	9	5	10
Joel Carreño	1	0	1.15	11	0	0	15.2	11	2	2	4	14
Wil Ledezma	0	0	15.00	5	0	0	6.0	11	10	10	7	6
Rommie Lewis	0	0	9.00	6	0	0	5.0	12	8	5	2	5
Trever Miller	0	0	4.91	6	0	0	3.2	6	2	2	2	2
David Purcey	0	0	11.57	5	0	0	2.1	3	3	3	4	3
Chad Beck	0	0	0.00	3	0	0	2.1	1	0	0	0	3
Danny Farquhar	0	0	13.50	3	0	0	2.0	4	4	3	2	1
Mike McCoy	0	0	0.00	1	0	0	1.0	0	0	0	0	0
P.J. Walters	0	0	0.00	1	0	0	1.0	0	0	0	1	1
Scott Richmond	0	0	0.00	1	0	0	0.1	0	0	0	0	0
Brian Tallet	0	1	54.00	1	0	0	0.1	2	2	2	2	1
Team totals	81	81	4.32	162	162	33	1458.2	1433	761	700	540	1169

== Honours and awards ==
All-Star Game

- José Bautista, 2nd selection
- Ricky Romero, 1st selection

Home Run Derby

- José Bautista, 1st selection

Player of the Week

- Ricky Romero – August 1–7

Player of the Month

- José Bautista – April, May

Pitcher of the Month

- Ricky Romero – August

Hank Aaron Award

- José Bautista

Silver Slugger

- José Bautista – OF

== Farm system ==
Level	Team	League	Manager
AAA	Las Vegas 51s	Pacific Coast League	Marty Brown
AA	New Hampshire Fisher Cats	Eastern League	Sal Fasano
A	Dunedin Blue Jays	Florida State League	Clayton McCullough
A	Lansing Lugnuts	Midwest League	Mike Redmond
A-Short Season	Vancouver Canadians	Northwest League	John Schneider and Rich Miller
Rookie	Bluefield Blue Jays	Appalachian League	Dennis Holmberg
Rookie	GCL Blue Jays	Gulf Coast League	Omar Malavé

LEAGUE CHAMPIONS: New Hampshire, Vancouver
