= Bradley Aaron =

Bradley Aaron may refer to:

- Bradley Aaron Keselowski (born 1984), American professional stock car racing driver, team owner, and entrepreneur
- Bradley Aaron Mills (born 1985), American former MLB pitcher and current coach
