= Luis Pérez (pitcher) =

Dominican baseball player (born 1985)

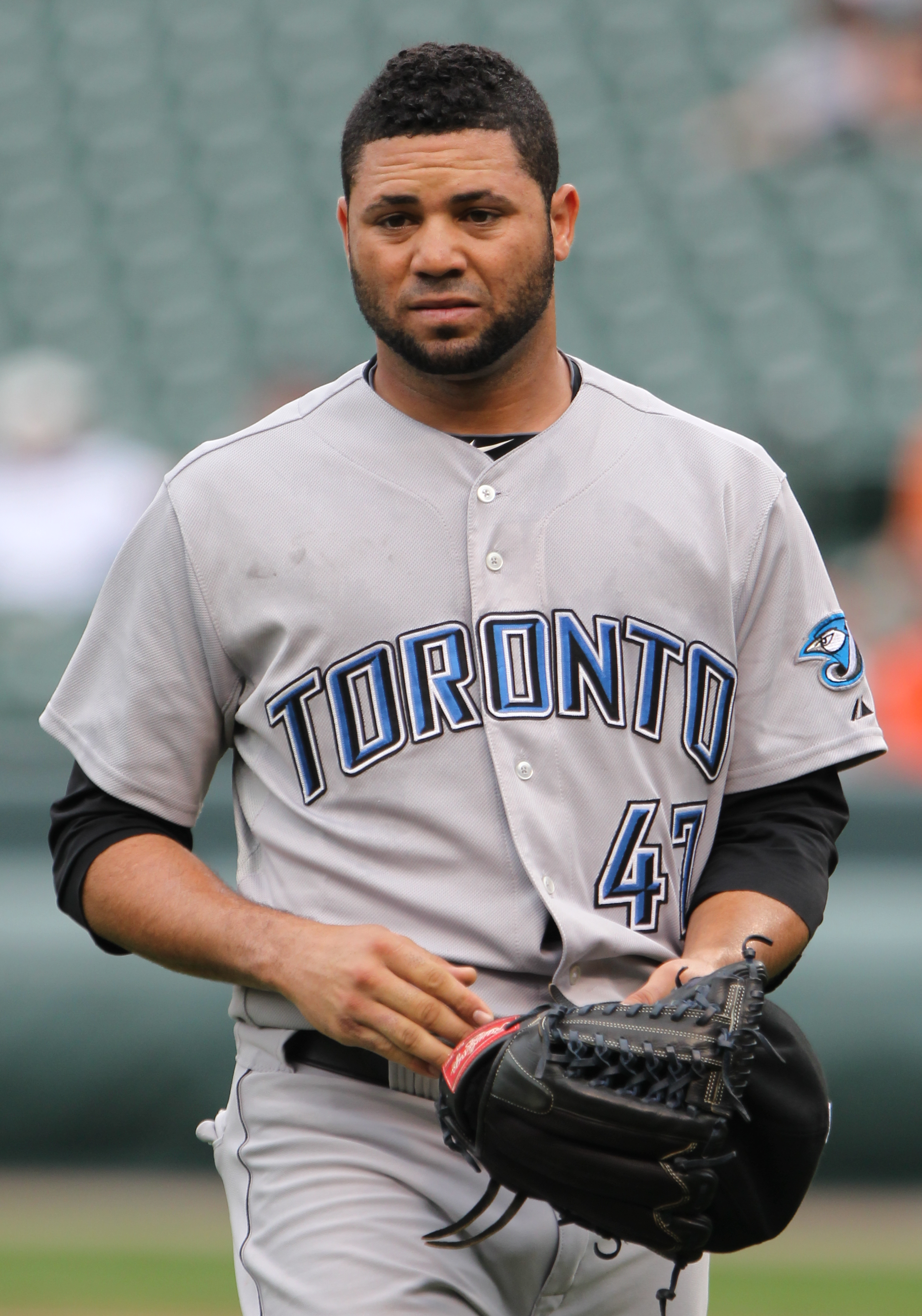
- Pérez with the Toronto Blue Jays in 2011
- Relief pitcher
- Born: January 20, 1985 (age 41); Guayubín, Dominican Republic
- Batted: Left Threw: Left

Professional debut
- MLB: April 16, 2011, for the Toronto Blue Jays
- NPB: March 25, 2016, for the Tokyo Yakult Swallows

Last appearance
- MLB: September 29, 2013, for the Toronto Blue Jays
- NPB: July 28, 2016, for the Tokyo Yakult Swallows

MLB statistics
- Win–loss record: 5–6
- Earned run average: 4.50
- Strikeouts: 99
- WHIP: 1.44

NPB statistics
- Win–loss record: 2–2
- Earned run average: 8.02
- Strikeouts: 19
- WHIP: 2.11
- Stats at Baseball Reference

Teams
- Toronto Blue Jays (2011–2013); Tokyo Yakult Swallows (2016)

Luis Manuel Pérez Gonzalez (born January 20, 1985) is a Dominican former professional baseball pitcher. He played in Major League Baseball (MLB) for the Toronto Blue Jays and in Nippon Professional Baseball (NPB) for the Tokyo Yakult Swallows.

== Career ==
=== Toronto Blue Jays ===
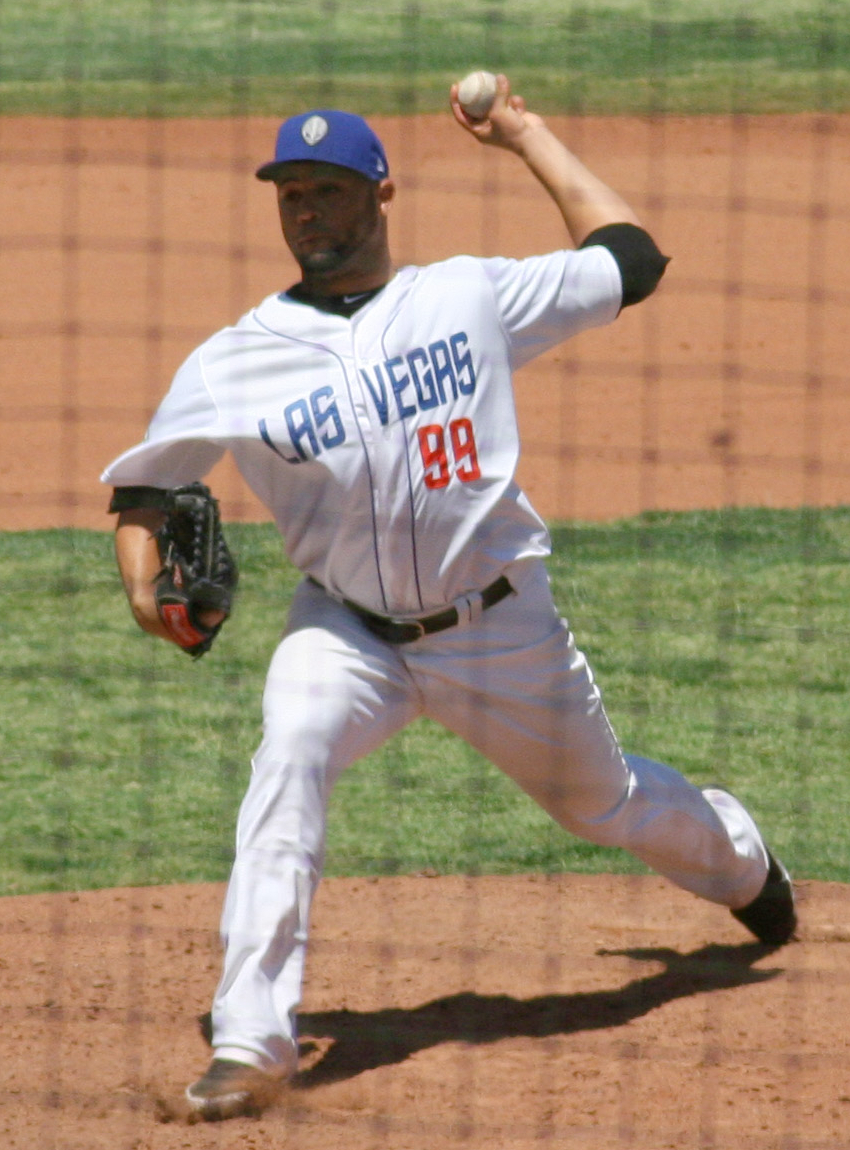
Pérez pitching for the Las Vegas 51s, Triple-A affiliate of the Toronto Blue Jays, in 2011

In 2006, his first year at Single A, Pérez went 4–0 with a 1.38 ERA. During his tenure in the minors he had a 12–15 record with a 2.99 ERA in his first 3 seasons (2006–2008).

On April 15, 2011 Pérez got his first call up to the Toronto Blue Jays. On May 28, Pérez recorded his first career win in a 14-inning game against the Chicago White Sox. Corey Patterson hit a solo walk-off home run to give him the win.

After making 29 appearances out of the bullpen for the Blue Jays, Pérez made his first career start against the Oakland Athletics on August 21, 2011. Pérez got the win, pitching 6 innings and giving up just 1 hit and 2 walks. He struck out 4 batters and retired 15 straight batters to open the game.

Pérez recorded the win for the Blue Jays against the Cleveland Indians on Opening Day (April 5, 2012), throwing 4 scoreless innings. The 16 inning game was the longest game in Opening Day history.

After pitching to a 2-2 record with a 3.43 ERA in 35 relief appearances, Pérez was removed from a game against the Chicago White Sox on July 8. After the game it was determined Pérez had torn his ulnar collateral ligament, and missed the rest of the 2012 season.

On May 7, 2013, it was reported Pérez was expected to return faster than the usual one-year recovery time associated with Tommy John surgery. Pérez was added to the Dunedin Blue Jays roster for a rehab assignment, and pitched two innings in relief on June 10. His rehab assignment was changed to the Triple-A Buffalo Bisons on August 28. He was activated from the 60-day disabled list by the Blue Jays on September 3 after the Bisons season ended, and the major league rosters expanded. Pérez made his first appearance of the 2013 season on September 4.

Pérez had surgery on his left elbow in January 2014 to remove scar tissue. On March 20, 2014, he was released by the Blue Jays to make room for Matt Tuiasosopo.

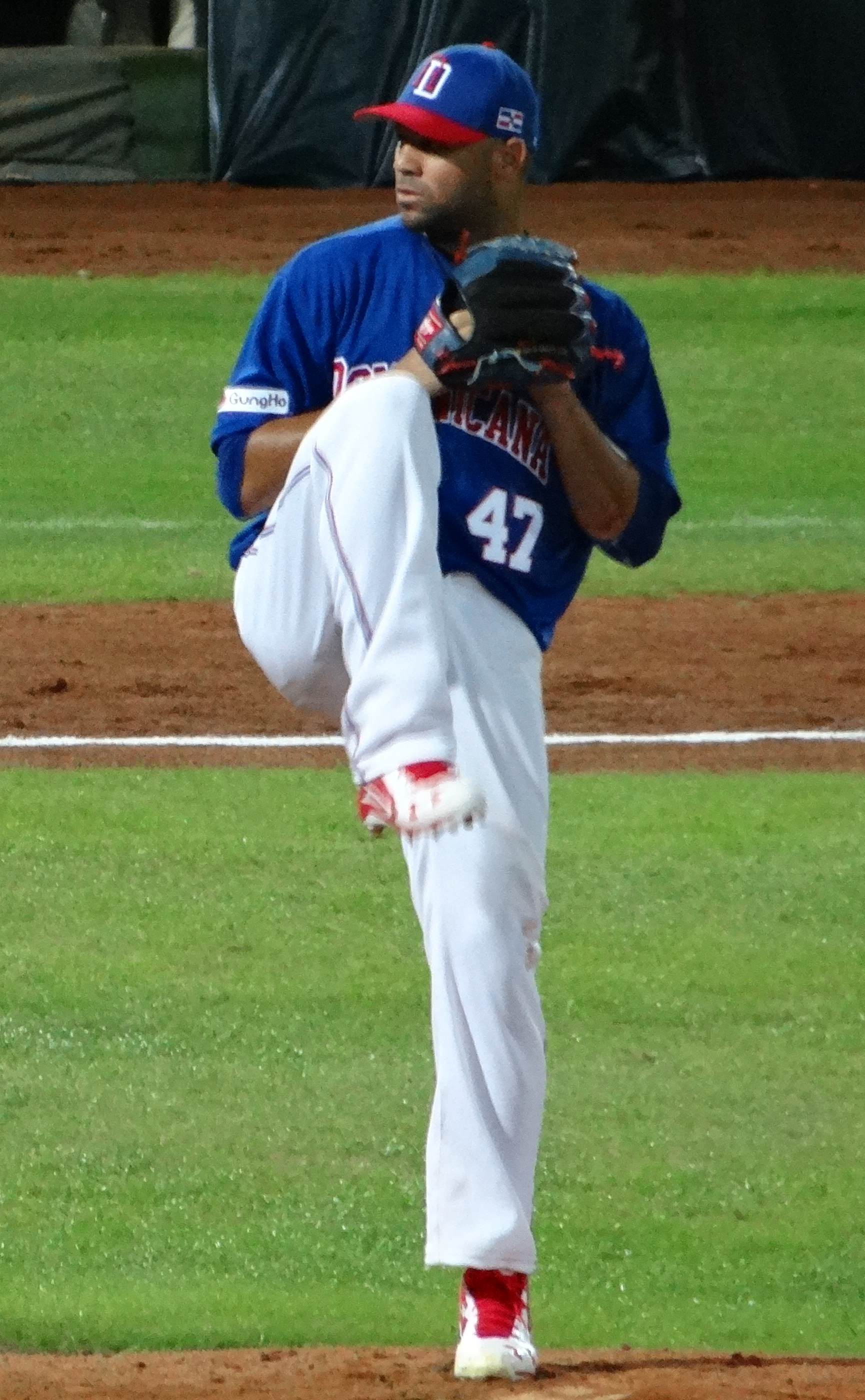
Pérez pitching for the Dominican Republic national team in 2015 WBSC Premier12 warm-up game

=== Atlanta Braves ===
Pérez signed a minor league deal with the Atlanta Braves on March 31, 2014. Still recovering from his elbow injuries, he would not throw a single pitch for Atlanta's minor league affiliates, and became a free agent at the end of the 2014 season.

=== Toronto Blue Jays (second stint) ===
On February 6, 2015, Pérez signed a minor league contract with the Blue Jays that included an invitation to spring training. In 37 games split between the Double–A New Hampshire Fisher Cats and Triple–A Buffalo Bisons, he compiled a cumulative 2–2 record and 4.23 ERA with 54 strikeouts across 66 innings of work. Pérez elected free agency following the season on November 6.

=== Tokyo Yakult Swallows ===
After the 2015 season, Pérez was selected to the roster for the Dominican Republic national baseball team at the 2015 WBSC Premier12. On December 24, 2015, he signed a one-year, $450,000 contract with the Tokyo Yakult Swallows. Pérez made 19 appearances for Yakult in 2016, struggling to an 8.02 ERA with 19 strikeouts over 21 1/3 innings pitched.

=== Sultanes de Monterrey ===
Pérez signed a minor league contract with the Cleveland Indians on February 10, 2017. He was released prior to the start of the season on March 29.

On January 31, 2018, Pérez signed with the Sultanes de Monterrey of the Mexican League. In 4 starts for Monterrey, he worked to a 1–1 record and 5.79 ERA with 13 strikeouts across 18 2/3 innings pitched. Perez was released by the Sultanes on April 13.
