= Darin Mastroianni =

American baseball player (born 1985)

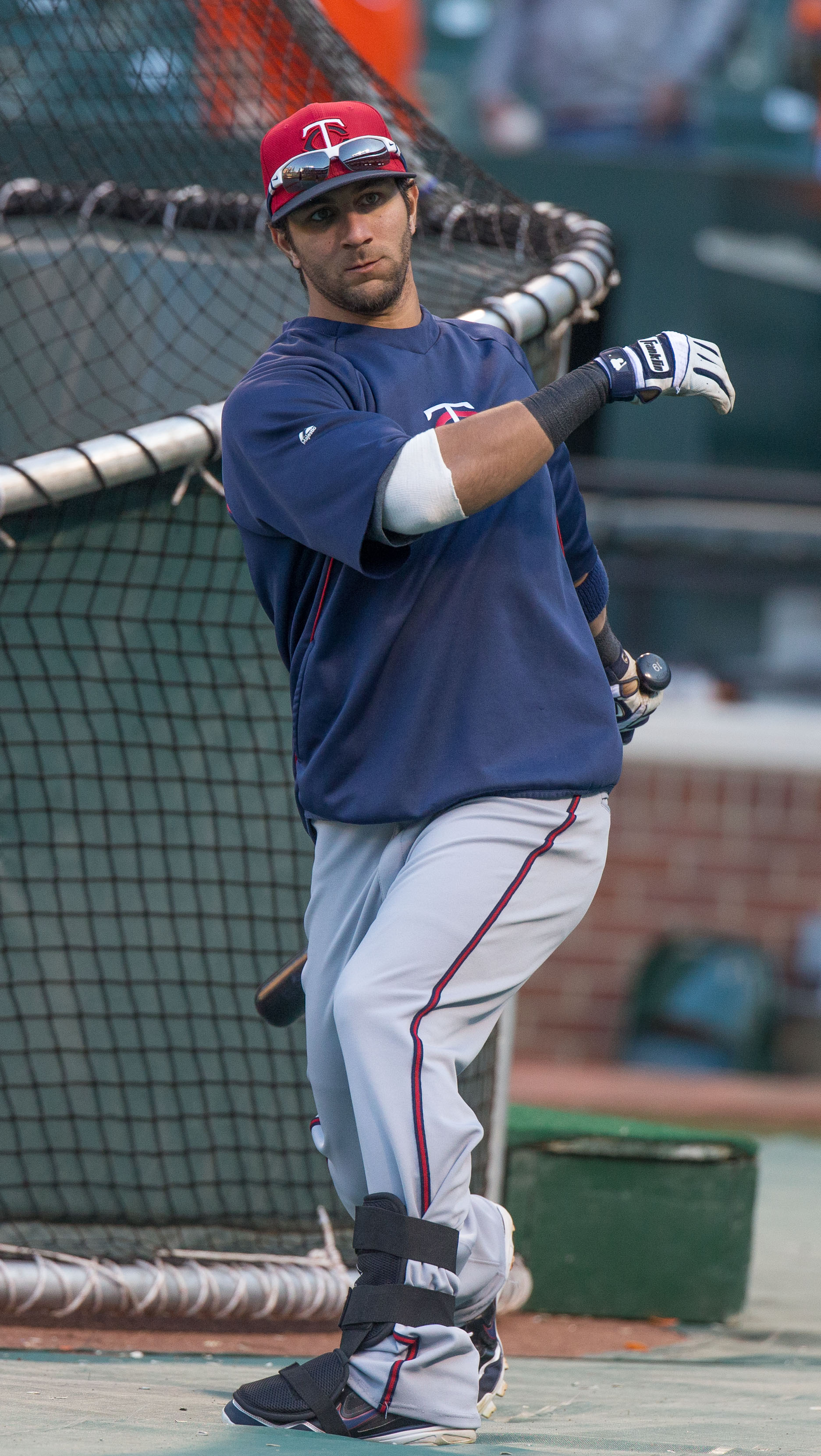
- Mastroianni with the Minnesota Twins
- Outfielder
- Born: August 26, 1985 (age 41); Mount Kisco, New York, U.S.
- Batted: Right Threw: Right

MLB debut
- August 24, 2011, for the Toronto Blue Jays

Last MLB appearance
- May 21, 2016, for the Minnesota Twins

MLB statistics
- Batting average: .206
- Home runs: 4
- Runs batted in: 24
- Stats at Baseball Reference

Teams
- Toronto Blue Jays (2011); Minnesota Twins (2012–2014); Toronto Blue Jays (2014); Minnesota Twins (2016)

Darin Paul Mastroianni (born August 26, 1985) is an American former professional baseball outfielder. He played in Major League Baseball (MLB) for the Toronto Blue Jays and Minnesota Twins.

Mastroianni was born in Mount Kisco, New York and attended Fox Lane High School in Bedford, New York and then Winthrop University and University of Southern Indiana. He was drafted by the Toronto Blue Jays in the 16th round of the 2007 MLB amateur draft.

== Playing career ==
=== Toronto Blue Jays ===
He played for the Auburn Doubledays in 2007, hitting .287 with three home runs, 26 RBI and 20 stolen bases in 68 games. In 2008, he hit .228 with three home runs, 25 RBI and 30 stolen bases for the Lansing Lugnuts. He split 2009 between the Dunedin Blue Jays and New Hampshire Fisher Cats, hitting a combined .297 with 70 stolen bases in 131 games. He played for the Fisher Cats again in 2010, hitting .301 with 46 stolen bases.

Mastroianni was called up to replace the newly acquired Kelly Johnson, who had to return to Arizona because he forgot his passport. He debuted for the Blue Jays on August 24, 2011, in center field. Mastroianni finished his debut 0-for-2 with a strikeout. He was designated for assignment before the 2012 season began.

=== Minnesota Twins ===
On February 9, 2012, he was claimed off waivers by the Minnesota Twins. He was assigned to Double-A New Britain, where he was the Opening Day left fielder. He earned his first major league hit and RBI on May 11, 2012. He hit his first major league home run on June 27, 2012.

Mastroianni's contract was purchased from the Triple-A Rochester Red Wings on April 9, 2014. He was designated for assignment eleven days later.

=== Toronto Blue Jays (second stint) ===
Mastroianni was claimed off waivers by the Toronto Blue Jays on April 22, and was optioned to the Triple-A Buffalo Bisons. He was recalled by the Blue Jays on June 12, and sent back to Buffalo after appearing in 14 games, where he batted .156 with 1 home run and 2 RBI. Mastroianni was designated for assignment on September 2. He elected free agency on October 4.

=== Philadelphia Phillies ===
On November 1, 2014, Mastroianni signed a minor-league contract with the Philadelphia Phillies. He played in 16 games for the Triple–A Lehigh Valley IronPigs, hitting .293/.333/.362 with two RBI and five stolen bases.

=== Washington Nationals ===
On May 5, 2015, Mastroianni was traded to the Washington Nationals in exchange for cash considerations. In 96 games for the Triple–A Syracuse Chiefs, he hit .252/.305/.343 with three home runs, 34 RBI, and 20 stolen bases.

=== Minnesota Twins (second stint) ===
On December 14, 2015, Mastroianni signed a minor league contract with the Minnesota Twins organization. On May 6, 2016, the Twins purchased Mastroianni's contract, adding him to their active roster. He went hitless in seven games for the Twins before suffering a left oblique strain. Upon his activation from the injured list on July 4, Mastroianni was removed from the 40–man roster and sent outright to the Triple–A Rochester Red Wings. After hitting .256 in 51 games for Rochester, he was released by the Twins organization on August 9.

=== Texas Rangers ===
On August 16, 2016, Mastroianni signed a minor league contract with the Texas Rangers organization. In 23 games for the Double–A Frisco RoughRiders, he hit .232/.284/.326 with one home run, six RBI, and five stolen bases. Mastroianni elected free agency following the season on November 7.
