= Joel Carreño =

Dominican baseball player (born 1987)

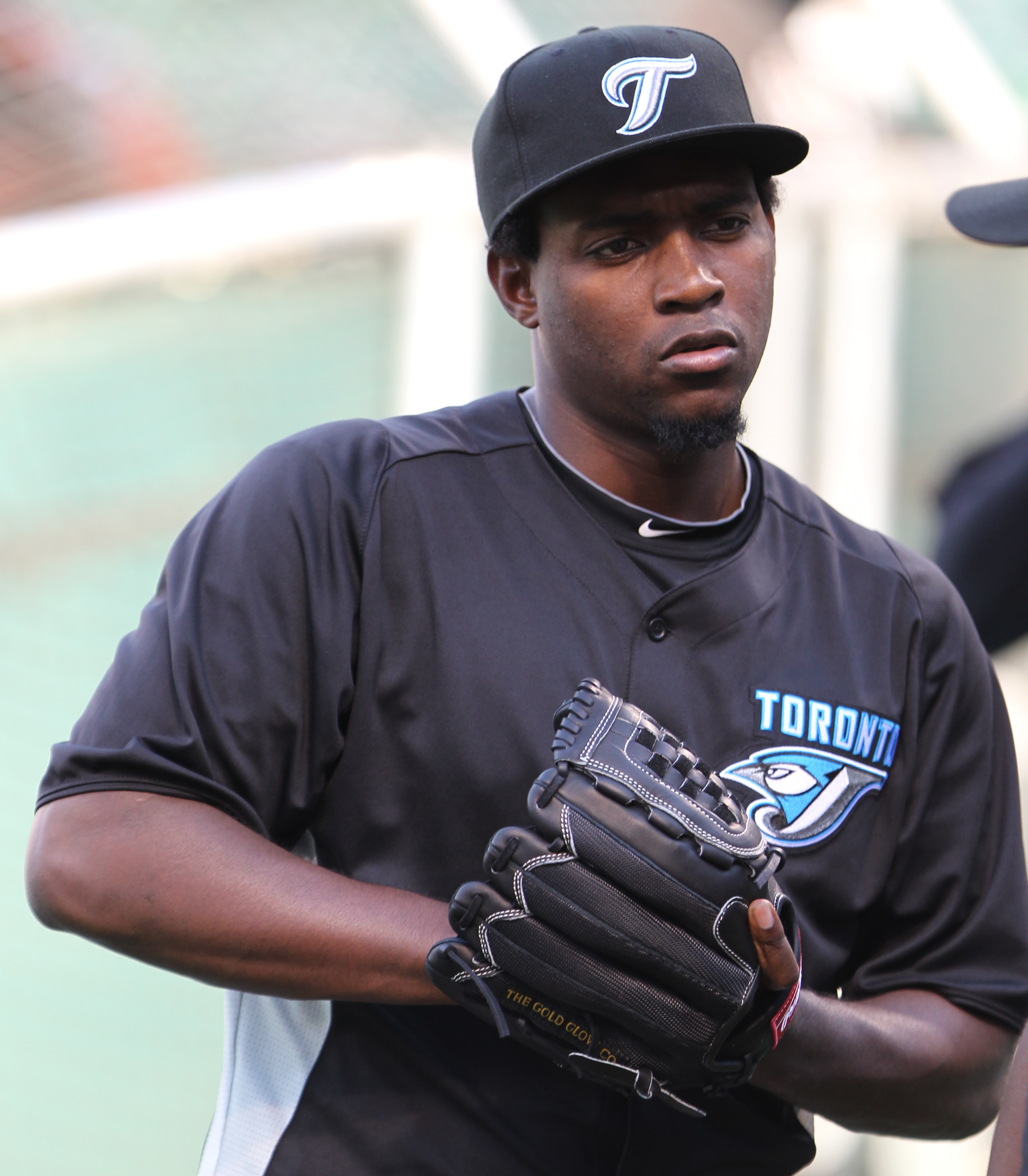
- Carreño with the Toronto Blue Jays in 2011
- Pitcher
- Born: March 7, 1987 (age 38); San Cristóbal, Dominican Republic
- Batted: Right Threw: Right

MLB debut
- August 23, 2011, for the Toronto Blue Jays

Last MLB appearance
- September 28, 2012, for the Toronto Blue Jays

MLB statistics
- Win–loss record: 1–2
- Earned run average: 4.06
- Strikeouts: 30
- Stats at Baseball Reference

Teams
- Toronto Blue Jays (2011–2012)

Joel Fernando Carreño Decena (born March 7, 1987) is a Dominican former professional baseball pitcher. He played in Major League Baseball (MLB) for the Toronto Blue Jays.

== Career ==
Carreño began his professional career in 2006, pitching for the DSL Blue Jays. That year, he went 8–3 with a 1.53 ERA in 15 starts, striking out 86 batters in 82 1/3 innings. In 2007, he pitched for the GCL Blue Jays, going 6–4 with a 2.62 ERA in 12 starts. With the Auburn Doubledays in 2008, he went 5–5 with a 3.42 ERA in 15 games (13 starts), striking out 85 batters in 76 1/3 innings.

Carreño split 2009 between the Doubledays and Lansing Lugnuts, going a combined 3–4 with a 3.28 ERA in 16 starts. With the Dunedin Blue Jays in 2010, he went 9–6 with a 3.73 ERA in 27 games (25 starts). He struck out 173 batters in 137 2/3 innings.

The Blue Jays promoted Carreño to the majors for the first time on August 19, 2011. He made his debut on August 23, 2011, pitching 3.1 innings without giving up a run against the Kansas City Royals.

=== 2012 ===
Carreño was a spring training invitee, and was named the third starter in the Blue Jays rotation following the completion of spring training due to an injury to Dustin McGowan and the demotion of Brett Cecil. He made his first career start on April 8 against the Cleveland Indians. He pitched 6 innings, giving up 6 hits, 4 earned runs, 4 walks and 3 strikeouts. Carreño was optioned to Triple-A Las Vegas following the game.

Carreño was recalled to the Blue Jays on July 26. Carreño was returned to Triple-A again on July 31 following Blue Jays trades for pitchers Brad Lincoln and Steve Delabar. Carreño was sent to Double-A New Hampshire Fisher Cats on Aug 1. Carreno was recalled to the Blue Jays active roster on September 7 after the New Hampshire Fisher Cats season ended.

On November 19, 2012, Carreño was designated for assignment by the Blue Jays to make room on the roster after a 12 player trade with the Miami Marlins. On November 30, Carreño was sent outright to the Blue Jays Triple-A affiliate Buffalo Bisons.

=== 2013 ===
Carreño pitched for the Double-A New Hampshire Fisher Cats until he was promoted to the Triple-A Buffalo Bisons on May 29.

=== New York Mets ===
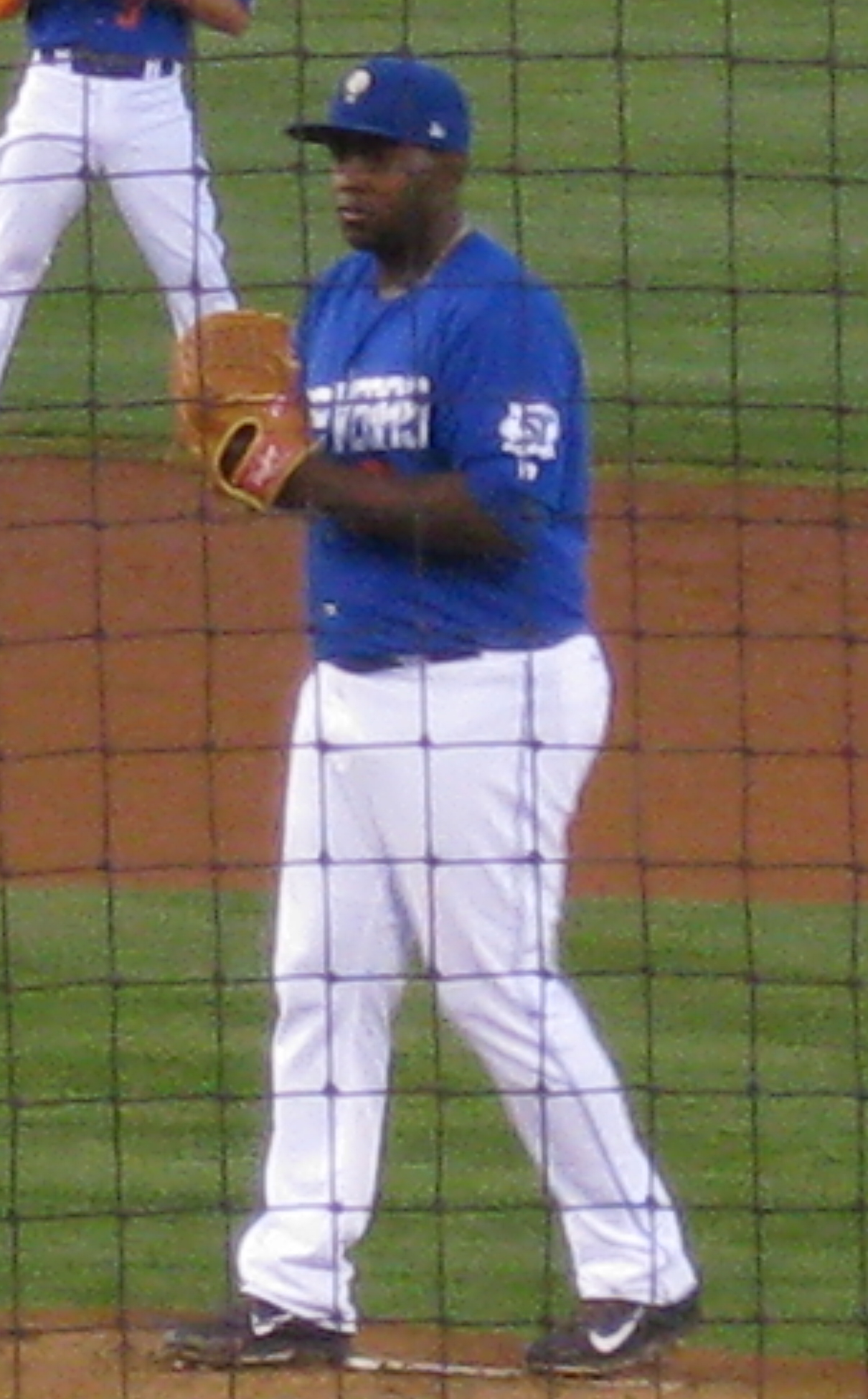
Carreño pitching for the Las Vegas 51s, triple-A affiliates of the Mets, in 2014

On November 8, 2013, the New York Mets signed Carreño to a minor league contract and invited him to their major league spring training camp. He became a free agent after the 2014 season.
