= 2011 Kansas City Royals season =

2011 Kansas City Royals
- League: American League
- Division: Central
- Ballpark: Kauffman Stadium
- City: Kansas City, Missouri
- Record: 71–91 (.438)
- Divisional place: 4th
- Owners: David Glass
- General managers: Dayton Moore
- Managers: Ned Yost
- Television: Fox Sports Kansas City (Ryan Lefebvre, Paul Splittorff through May 25, Frank White)
- Radio: KCSP 610 AM (Denny Matthews, Bob Davis, Steve Stewart, Ryan Lefebvre)

The Kansas City Royals' season of 2011 was the 43rd for the Royals franchise. It was the fifth full season with Dayton Moore as general manager. The team was managed by Ned Yost in his first full season with the Royals. It was the 26th straight year of the Royals missing the playoffs.

== Offseason ==
On November 10, 2010, the Royals traded outfielder David DeJesus for the right-handed, starting pitcher Vin Mazzaro from the Oakland Athletics and minor league pitcher Justin Marks. Mazzaro was 10–17 with a 4.72 ERA in 41 career Major League appearances, including 35 starts, for the Athletics in 2009 and 2010.

== Pitching ==
Bruce Chen began the year with a 4–1 record and 3.59 ERA in seven starts for the Royals. Chen was placed on the 15-day Disabled List on May 11 (retroactive to May 6), with a strain, and right-handed pitcher Vin Mazzaro was recalled from the Omaha Storm Chasers. Mazzaro's first start was on May 11 versus the New York Yankees. Mazzaro's stay with the Royals was a short-lived one. Following his second appearance on May 16, in which he allowed 14 earned runs in 2 1/3 innings of relief, a team record for runs given up by one pitcher in a game, and the worst performance of a pitcher in the Major Leagues since the first half of the 20th century,– Mazzaro was optioned to Omaha, and left-hand relief pitcher Everett Teaford was called up to replace him. Mazzaro pitched 6 1/3 innings with a 22.74 ERA in his two appearances.

== Regular season ==
The Royals opened the season at home on Thursday, March 31, in a four-game weekend series versus the Los Angeles Angels of Anaheim. It was their first Opening Day meeting since 1975 when the Angels hosted the Royals. Luke Hochevar, who was the first-round draft pick of the Royals in 2006, was chosen to pitch in his first Opening Day start. He gave up four runs, including two sole home runs, in 5 2/3 innings for the loss. The opposing starter Jered Weaver pitched 6 1/3 scoreless innings to earn his first win of the season with Fernando Rodney closing the game in the ninth inning for his first save as the Angels defeated the Royals, 4–2. The attendance for the game was 40,055, (currently) the highest of any home game during the season. This game also saw the major league debut of three Royals rookie pitchers: Aaron Crow, Tim Collins, and Nathan Adcock.

After two games versus the Chicago White Sox, the Royals finished their home opening series with a 4–2 record and ½ game lead in their division. It was the best home opening series since 2004 when they also began the season at home by winning 4 out of 6 games. This season's series was notable because three of their wins came on their final at-bat, and the last three games each extended into extra innings.

Although the team was successful during the first half of April–occupying first place on eight of those days while winning 10 of 14 games–the latter half of the month saw the team lose nine games as they fell 4 1/2 games behind the division-leading Cleveland Indians. During a six-game losing streak while on the road, Royals pitchers gave up 17 home runs and had an ERA of 7.88. It included three games at Cleveland where the Indians were in the midst of a 14-home-game winning streak. With a 14–13 record, it was only the third time in 22 years that the Royals ended the month with more wins than losses; the last time was in 2009.

The team's worst loss came at home on May 16 in a 19–1 rout by the Cleveland Indians. After giving up three walks to load the bases in the first inning, starting pitcher Kyle Davies left the game with an injury. Nathan Adcock replaced him and allowed two of the base runners to score–giving Davies his sixth loss of the season. Vin Mazzaro, who had been scheduled to start the next day, entered the game in the third inning and gave up 14 earned runs on 11 hits in just 2 1/3 innings. Three of the ten runs scored in the fourth inning came on a 3-run home run by Michael Brantley. The 18-run deficit matched the worst margin of defeat in the team's history which has occurred twice before, the most recent being the previous season on July 26 when the Minnesota Twins also won 19–1.

Because of the Twins' plague of injuries, the Royals came out fourth place. During a stretch of games from September 11 to 17, the Royals won seven straight, giving them their longest winning record since the 2006 season. However, the Royals were no-hit to the fifth/sixth inning twice in a row (the first, a perfect game). During the last week of the season, Billy Butler, Alex Gordon and Louis Coleman were all struck by the flu, giving Jarrod Dyson and Lorenzo Cain a chance in the big leagues.

=== Season standings ===
==== American League Central ====
AL Central
Team	W	L	Pct.	GB	Home	Road
Detroit Tigers	95	67	.586	—	50‍–‍31	45‍–‍36
Cleveland Indians	80	82	.494	15	44‍–‍37	36‍–‍45
Chicago White Sox	79	83	.488	16	36‍–‍45	43‍–‍38
Kansas City Royals	71	91	.438	24	40‍–‍41	31‍–‍50
Minnesota Twins	63	99	.389	32	33‍–‍48	30‍–‍51

==== American League Wild Card ====
Division winners
Team	W	L	Pct.
New York Yankees	97	65	.599
Texas Rangers	96	66	.593
Detroit Tigers	95	67	.586

Wild Card team (Top team qualifies for postseason)
Team	W	L	Pct.	GB
Tampa Bay Rays	91	71	.562	—
Boston Red Sox	90	72	.556	1
Los Angeles Angels of Anaheim	86	76	.531	5
Toronto Blue Jays	81	81	.500	10
Cleveland Indians	80	82	.494	11
Chicago White Sox	79	83	.488	12
Oakland Athletics	74	88	.457	17
Kansas City Royals	71	91	.438	20
Baltimore Orioles	69	93	.426	22
Seattle Mariners	67	95	.414	24
Minnesota Twins	63	99	.389	28

=== Record vs. opponents ===
American League East
American League Central
American League West

Team	Record
Baltimore Orioles	4–5
Boston Red Sox	2–2
Chicago White Sox	6–5
Cleveland Indians	4–8
Detroit Tigers	4–8
Los Angeles Angels	7–3
Minnesota Twins	5–8
New York Yankees	3–3
Oakland Athletics	1–5
Seattle Mariners	3–1
Tampa Bay Rays	2–5
Texas Rangers	3–5
Toronto Blue Jays	2–2
Interleague play	5–13

=== Game log ===
Legend
Royals Win	Royals Loss	Game postponed

2011 Game Log
March/April (14–13)

#	Date	Opponent	Score	Win	Loss	Save	Attendance	Record
1	March 31	Los Angeles Angels	L 2–4	Weaver (1–0)	Hochevar (0–1)	Rodney (1)	40,055	0–1
2	April 1	Los Angeles Angels	W 2–1	Soria (1–0)	Kohn (0–1)		13,302	1–1
3	April 2	Los Angeles Angels	W 5–4	Crow (1–0)	Jepsen (0–1)	Soria (1)	17,328	2–1
4	April 3	Los Angeles Angels	W 12–9 (13)	Collins (1–0)	Bulger (0–1)		14,085	3–1
5	April 5	Chicago White Sox	W 7–6 (12)	Jeffress (1–0)	Peña (0–1)		12,641	4–1
6	April 6	Chicago White Sox	L 7–10 (12)	Sale (1–0)	O'Sullivan (0–1)		13,360	4–2
7	April 8	@ Detroit Tigers	L 2–5	Scherzer (2–0)	Davies (0–1)	Valverde (2)	44,799	4–3
8	April 9	@ Detroit Tigers	W 3–1	Chen (1–0)	Coke (0–2)	Soria (2)	33,810	5–3
9	April 10	@ Detroit Tigers	W 9–5	Hochevar (1–1)	Porcello (0–2)	Soria (3)	28,984	6–3
10	April 12	@ Minnesota Twins	L 3–4 (10)	Hughes (1–0)	Tejeda (0–1)		38,154	6–4
11	April 13	@ Minnesota Twins	W 10–5	Davies (1–1)	Liriano (0–3)	Jeffress (1)	36,286	7–4
12	April 14	Seattle Mariners	W 5–1 (8)	Chen (2–0)	Fister (0–3)		8,811	8–4
13	April 15	Seattle Mariners	W 6–5	Hochevar (2–1)	Bédard (0–3)	Soria (4)	13,686	9–4
14	April 16	Seattle Mariners	W 7–0	O'Sullivan (1–1)	Hernández (1–2)		22,364	10–4
15	April 17	Seattle Mariners	L 2–3	Pineda (2–1)	Francis (0–1)	League (3)	19,424	10–5
16	April 18	Cleveland Indians	L 3–7 (10)	Smith (1–0)	Collins (1–1)		12,214	10–6
17	April 19	Cleveland Indians	W 5–4	Chen (3–0)	Gómez (0–1)	Soria (5)	10,506	11–6
18	April 20	Cleveland Indians	L 5–7	Masterson (4–0)	Hochevar (2–2)	Perez (6)	10,080	11–7
19	April 21	Cleveland Indians	W 3–2	Crow (2–0)	Perez (0–1)		9,279	12–7
20	April 22	@ Texas Rangers	L 6–11	Holland (3–1)	Francis (0–2)		45,769	12–8
21	April 23	@ Texas Rangers	L 1–3	Ogando (3–0)	Davies (1–2)	Oliver (1)	45,506	12–9
22	April 24	@ Texas Rangers	L 8–7	Wilson (3–0)	Chen (3–1)	Rhodes (1)	28,284	12–10
23	April 26	@ Cleveland Indians	L 4–9	Masterson (5–0)	Hochevar (2–3)		9,650	12–11
24	April 27	@ Cleveland Indians	L 2–7	Tomlin (4–0)	Francis (0–3)		9,722	12–12
25	April 28	@ Cleveland Indians	L 2–8	Carmona (2–3)	Davies (1–3)		9,076	12–13
26	April 29	Minnesota Twins	W 4–3	Wood (1–0)	Burnett (0–1)	Soria (6)	31,407	13–13
27	April 30	Minnesota Twins	W 11–2	Adcock (1–0)	Duensing (2–1)		22,099	14–13

May (10–17)

#	Date	Opponent	Score	Win	Loss	Save	Attendance	Record
28	May 1	Minnesota Twins	W 10–3	Hochevar (3–3)	Pavano (2–3)		18,108	15–13
29	May 3	Baltimore Orioles	W 6–5 (10)	Collins (2–1)	Berken (0–2)		11,986	16–13
30	May 4	Baltimore Orioles	L 2–3	Arrieta (4–1)	Davies (1–4)	Gregg (6)	11,130	16–14
31	May 5	Baltimore Orioles	W 9–1	Chen (4–1)	Tillman (1–3)		29,927	17–14
32	May 6	Oakland Athletics	L 2–3	Gonzalez (4–2)	O'Sullivan (1–2)	Fuentes (8)	30,690	17–15
33	May 7	Oakland Athletics	W 4–3	Soria (2–0)	McCarthy (1–3)		25,828	18–15
34	May 8	Oakland Athletics	L 2–5	Ross (2–2)	Francis (0–4)	Fuentes (9)	22,435	18–16
35	May 10	@ New York Yankees	L 1–3	García (2–2)	Davies (1–5)	Rivera (13)	41,275	18–17
36	May 11	@ New York Yankees	W 4–3 (11)	Soria (3–0)	Carlyle (0–1)	Coleman (1)	40,164	19–17
37	May 12	@ New York Yankees	W 11–5	O'Sullivan (2–2)	Nova (3–3)		41,790	20–17
38	May 13	@ Detroit Tigers	L 1–3	Verlander (4–3)	Hochevar (3–4)	Valverde (9)	33,641	20–18
39	May 14	@ Detroit Tigers	L 0–3	Penny (4–3)	Francis (0–5)	Valverde (10)	37,647	20–19
–	May 15	@ Detroit Tigers	-	–	–	–	–	-
40	May 16	Cleveland Indians	L 1–19	Tomlin (5–1)	Davies (1–6)		12,242	20–20
41	May 17	Cleveland Indians	L 3–7	Carrasco (2–2)	O'Sullivan (2–3)		17,712	20–21
42	May 18	Texas Rangers	L 4–5 (11)	Rhodes (2–2)	Jeffress (1–1)	Lowe (1)	13,789	20–22
43	May 19	Texas Rangers	W 2–1 (10)	Holland (1–0)	Oliver (1–5)		12,355	21–22
44	May 20	St. Louis Cardinals	W 3–0	Francis (1–5)	Carpenter (1–4)	Soria (7)	26,816	22–22
45	May 21	St. Louis Cardinals	L 0–3	Westbrook (4–3)	Collins (2–2)	Salas (6)	32,229	22–23
46	May 22	St. Louis Cardinals	L 8–9 (10)	Motte (2–1)	Coleman (0–1)	Salas (7)	28,195	22–24
47	May 24	@ Baltimore Orioles	L 3–5	Simón (1–0)	Soria (3–1)		14,077	22–25
48	May 25	@ Baltimore Orioles	L 2–9	Arrieta (6–2)	Hochevar (3–5)		15,740	22–26
49	May 26	@ Baltimore Orioles	L 5–6(12)	Accardo (3–1)	Coleman (0–2)		22,720	22–27
50	May 27	@ Texas Rangers	W 12–7 (14)	Wood (2–0)	Bush (0–1)		39,390	23–27
51	May 28	@ Texas Rangers	L 1–10	Harrison (5–4)	O'Sullivan (2–4)	Tateyama (1)	40,240	23–28
52	May 29	@ Texas Rangers	L 6–7	Rhodes (3–2)	Soria (3–2)		45,011	23–29
53	May 30	Los Angeles Angels	L 8–10	Jepsen (1–2)	Soria (3–3)	Rodney (3)	24,406	23–30
54	May 31	Los Angeles Angels	W 7–3	Francis (2–5)	Piñeiro (2–2)		14,174	24–30

June (9–18)

#	Date	Opponent	Score	Win	Loss	Save	Attendance	Record
55	June 1	Los Angeles Angels	W 2–0	Collins (3–2)	Downs (3–2)		12,022	25–30
56	June 2	Minnesota Twins	L 2–8	Swarzak (1–2)	O'Sullivan (2–5)		14,584	25–31
57	June 3	Minnesota Twins	L 2–5	Pavano (3–5)	Duffy (0–1)		32,443	25–32
58	June 4	Minnesota Twins	L 2–7	Blackburn (5–4)	Hochevar (3–6)		27,861	25–33
59	June 5	Minnesota Twins	L 0–6	Duensing (3–5)	Francis (2–6)		21,704	25–34
60	June 6	Toronto Blue Jays	W 3–2 (11)	Soria (4–3)	Francisco (1–3)		12,194	26–34
61	June 7	Toronto Blue Jays	L 5–8	Drabek (4–4)	Mazzaro (0–1)	Rauch (7)	16,539	26–35
62	June 8	Toronto Blue Jays	L 8–9	Villanueva (4–0)	Duffy (0–1)	Janssen (1)	12,152	26–36
63	June 9	Toronto Blue Jays	W 3–2	Hochevar (4–6)	Romero (5–6)	Soria (8)	13,941	27–36
64	June 10	@ Los Angeles Angels	W 4–2	Francis (3–6)	Santana (3–6)	Soria (9)	38,254	28–36
65	June 11	@ Los Angeles Angels	L 5–7	Downs (4–2)	Collins (3–3)	Walden (14)	38,911	28–37
66	June 12	@ Los Angeles Angels	W 9–0	Mazzaro (1–1)	Chatwood (3–4)		39,114	29–37
67	June 14	@ Oakland Athletics	W 7–4	Duffy (1–2)	Cahill (6–5)	Soria (10)	11,439	30–37
68	June 15	@ Oakland Athletics	L 1–2	Outman (2–1)	Hochevar (4–7)	Bailey (2)	16,392	30–38
69	June 16	@ Oakland Athletics	L 4–8	Gonzalez (6–5)	Francis (3–7)		11,775	30–39
70	June 17	@ St. Louis Cardinals	W 5–4	Wood (3–0)	Carpenter (1–7)	Soria (11)	40,674	31–39
71	June 18	@ St. Louis Cardinals	L 4–5	Motte (3–1)	Holland (1–1)	Salas (12)	43,102	31–40
72	June 19	@ St. Louis Cardinals	L 4–5	Salas (4–1)	Collins (3–4)		41,660	31–41
73	June 21	Arizona Diamondbacks	L 2–7	Saunders (4–7)	Hochevar (4–8)		19,305	31–42
74	June 22	Arizona Diamondbacks	L 2–3	Kennedy (8–2)	Francis (3–8)	Putz (19)	14,265	31–43
75	June 23	Arizona Diamondbacks	L 3–5	Hudson (9–5)	Paulino (0–5)	Putz (20)	23,610	31–44
76	June 24	Chicago Cubs	L 4–6	Marshall (4–2)	Crow (2–1)	Mármol (16)	32,921	31–45
77	June 25	Chicago Cubs	W 3–2	Holland (2–1)	Samardzija (5–4)	Soria (12)	38,744	32–45
78	June 26	Chicago Cubs	W 6–3	Hochevar (5–8)	Wells (1–2)	Soria (13)	28,401	33–45
79	June 27	@ San Diego Padres	L 3–4	Latos (5–8)	Francis (3–9)	Bell (21)	23,635	33–46
80	June 28	@ San Diego Padres	L 2–4	Richard (4–9)	Paulino (0–6)	Bell (22)	20,250	33–47
81	June 29	@ San Diego Padres	L 1–4	Stauffer (4–5)	Chen (4–2)	Bell (23)	24,461	33–48

July (13–14)

#	Date	Opponent	Score	Win	Loss	Save	Attendance	Record
82	July 1	@ Colorado Rockies	L 0–9	Nicasio (3–1)	Duffy (1–3)		48,282	33–49
83	July 2	@ Colorado Rockies	L 6–9	G. Reynolds (3–0)	Davies (1–7)	Street (24)	49,227	33–50
84	July 3	@ Colorado Rockies	W 16–8	Wood (4–0)	Hammel (4–8)		40,269	34–50
85	July 4	@ Chicago White Sox	L 4–5	Santos (3–3)	Crow (2–2)		31,077	34–51
86	July 5	@ Chicago White Sox	W 5–3	Paulino (1–6)	Peavy (4–2)	Soria (14)	20,695	35–51
87	July 6	@ Chicago White Sox	W 4–1	Chen (5–2)	Jackson (5–7)	Soria (15)	27,233	36–51
88	July 7	Detroit Tigers	L 1–3	Scherzer (10–4)	Duffy (1–4)	Valverde (22)	16,355	36–52
89	July 8	Detroit Tigers	L 4–6	Porcello (8–6)	Davies (1–8)	Valverde (23)	34,563	36–53
90	July 9	Detroit Tigers	W 13–6	Holland (3–1)	Furbush (1–3)	Teaford (1)	25,941	37–53
91	July 10	Detroit Tigers	L 1–2	Verlander (12–4)	Francis (3–10)	Valverde (24)	18,373	37–54
92	July 14	@ Minnesota Twins	L 4–8	Liriano (6–7)	Chen (5–3)		39,584	37–55
93	July 15	@ Minnesota Twins	W 2–1	Collins (4–4)	Capps (2–5)	Soria (16)	39,177	38–55
94	July 16	@ Minnesota Twins	L 3–4	Perkins (1–1)	Francis (3–11)	Nathan (4)	41,295	38–56
95	July 17	@ Minnesota Twins	L 3–4	Duensing (7–7)	Paulino (1–7)	Nathan (5)	38,786	38–57
96	July 18	Chicago White Sox	L 2–5	Buehrle (7–5)	Davies (1–9)		17,190	38–58
97	July 19	Chicago White Sox	W 4–2	Duffy (2–4)	Peavy (4–4)	Soria (17)	20,126	39–58
98	July 20	Chicago White Sox	W 2–1 (11)	Crow (3–2)	Sale (2–1)		13,831	40–58
99	July 22	Tampa Bay Rays	W 10–4	Hochevar (6–8)	Davis (7–7)		27,824	41–58
100	July 23	Tampa Bay Rays	W 5–4 (10)	Soria (5–3)	Gomes (0–1)		27,643	42–58
101	July 24	Tampa Bay Rays	L 0–5	Cobb (3–0)	Paulino (1–8)		23,735	42–59
102	July 25	@ Boston Red Sox	W 3–1 (14)	Coleman (1–2)	Williams (0–1)	Soria (18)	37,727	43–59
103	July 26	@ Boston Red Sox	L 9–13	Aceves (6–1)	Adcock (1–1)		37,460	43–60
104	July 27	@ Boston Red Sox	L 5–12	Lackey (9–8)	Chen (5–4)		38,329	43–61
105	July 28	@ Boston Red Sox	W 4–3	Hochevar (7–8)	Beckett (9–4)	Soria (19)	37,822	44–61
106	July 29	@ Cleveland Indians	W 12–0	Francis (4–11)	Carrasco (8–9)		35,390	45–61
107	July 30	@ Cleveland Indians	L 2–5	Sipp (6–2)	Soria (5–4)		31,436	45–62
108	July 31	@ Cleveland Indians	W 5–3	Duffy (3–4)	Carmona (5–11)	Soria (20)	21,101	46–62

August (10–19)

#	Date	Opponent	Score	Win	Loss	Save	Attendance	Record
109	August 2	Baltimore Orioles	L 2–8	Simón (3–4)	Chen (5–5)		17,116	46–63
110	August 3	Baltimore Orioles	W 6–2	Hochevar (8–8)	Guthrie (5–15)	Holland (1)	14,187	47–53
111	August 4	Baltimore Orioles	W 9–4	Wood (5–0)	Britton (6–9)	–	12,161	48–53
112	August 5	Detroit Tigers	L 3–4 (10)	Schlereth (1–1)	Crow (3–3)	Valverde (31)	28,565	48–64
113	August 6	Detroit Tigers	L 3–4	Verlander (16–5)	Duffy (3–5)	Valverde (32)	25,818	48–65
114	August 7	Detroit Tigers	W 4–3	Chen (6–5)	Scherzer (11–7)	Soria (21)	20,132	49–65
115	August 8	@ Tampa Bay Rays	L 1–2	Farnsworth (4–1)	Wood (5–1)	–	10,742	49–66
116	August 9	@ Tampa Bay Rays	L 0–4	Shields (11–9)	Francis (4–12)	–	10,124	49–67
117	August 10	@ Tampa Bay Rays	L 7–8	McGee (1–1)	Soria (5–5)	–	11,706	49–68
118	August 11	@ Tampa Bay Rays	L 1–4	Niemann (7–4)	Duffy (3–6)	Farnsworth (21)	13,942	49–69
119	August 12	@ Chicago White Sox	W 5–1	Chen (7–5)	Stewart (1–2)	Holland (2)	23,130	50–69
120	August 13	@ Chicago White Sox	L 4–5	Crain (7–3)	Hochevar (8–9)	Sale (4)	24,854	50–70
121	August 14	@ Chicago White Sox	L 2–6	Danks (5–9)	Francis (4–13)	–	25,517	50–71
122	August 15	New York Yankees	L 4–7	Burnett (9–9)	Paulino (1–5)	Rivera (31)	24,879	50–72
123	August 16	New York Yankees	L 7–9	Nova (12–4)	Duffy (3–7)	Rivera (32)	22,258	50–73
124	August 17	New York Yankees	W 5–4	Chen (8–5)	Colón (8–7)	Soria (22)	22,435	51–73
125	August 18	Boston Red Sox	L 3–4	Beckett (10–5)	Hochevar (8–10)	Papelbon (29)	20,547	51–74
126	August 19	Boston Red Sox	L 1–7	Miller (5–1)	Francis (4–14)	Aceves (2)	21,262	51–75
127	August 20	Boston Red Sox	W 9–4	Paulino (2–9)	Albers (4–4)		28,588	52–75
128	August 21	Boston Red Sox	L 1–6	Lester (13–6)	Duffy (3–8)		25,723	52–76
129	August 23	@ Toronto Blue Jays	W 6–4	Chen (9–5)	Morrow (9–8)	Soria (23)	20,009	53–76
130	August 24	@ Toronto Blue Jays	L 3–4	Litsch (5–3)	Coleman (1–3)	Francisco (11)	18,292	53–77
131	August 25	@ Toronto Blue Jays	W 9–6	Francis (5–14)	Cecil (4–7)		17,355	54–77
132	August 26	@ Cleveland Indians	L 1–2	Jiménez (8–10)	Paulino (2–10)	C. Perez (28)	41,337	54–78
133	August 27	@ Cleveland Indians	L 7–8	Smith (3–3)	Coleman (1–4)	C. Perez (29)	35,370	54–79
134	August 28	@ Cleveland Indians	W 2–1	Chen (10–5)	Masterson (10–8)	Soria (24)	27,908	55–79
135	August 29	@ Detroit Tigers	W 9–5	Hochevar (9–10)	Scherzer (13–8)	Wood (1)	32,423	56–79
136	August 30	@ Detroit Tigers	L 1–2 (10)	Benoit (4–3)	Crow (3–4)		34,866	56–80
137	August 31	@ Detroit Tigers	L 4–5	Schlereth (2–1)	Wood (5–2)	Valverde (40)	33,572	56–81

September (15–10)

#	Date	Opponent	Score	Win	Loss	Save	Attendance	Record
138	September 1	@ Detroit Tigers	W 11–8	Crow (3–4)	Coke (2–9)	Soria (25)	39,084	57–81
139	September 2	Cleveland Indians	L 4–5	Masterson (11–8)	Chen (10–6)	Perez (31)	27,251	57–82
140	September 3	Cleveland Indians	W 5–1	Hochevar (10–10)	Huff (2–3)		27,126	58–82
141	September 4	Cleveland Indians	L 6–9	Gómez (2–2)	Francis (5–15)	Perez (32)	34,015	58–83
142	September 5	@ Oakland Athletics	W 11–6	Holland (4–1)	Bailey (0–4)		14,577	59–83
143	September 6	@ Oakland Athletics	W 7–4	Duffy (4–8)	Gonzalez (12–12)	Soria (26)	12,064	60–83
144	September 7	@ Oakland Athletics	L 0–7	Moscoso (8–8)	Chen (10–7)		13,132	60–84
145	September 8	@ Seattle Mariners	L 1–4	Vargas (8–13)	Hochevar (10–10)	League (34)	14,377	60–85
146	September 9	@ Seattle Mariners	L 3–7	Beavan (4–5)	Francis (5–16)		14,805	60–86
147	September 10	@ Seattle Mariners	W 4–2	Paulino (3–10)	Pineda (9–10)	Soria (27)	17,884	61–86
148	September 11	@ Seattle Mariners	W 2–1	Teaford (1–0)	Vasquez (1–3)	Soria (28)	20,951	62–86
149	September 13	Minnesota Twins	W 4–0	Chen (11–7)	Pavano (8–12)		25,253	63–86
150	September 14	Minnesota Twins	W 7–3	Hochevar (10–10)	Hendriks (0–2)	Holland (3)	19,076	64–86
151	September 15	Chicago White Sox	W 7–2	Francis (6–16)	Buehrle (11–9)		17,737	65–86
152	September 16	Chicago White Sox	W 7–6	Holland (5–1)	Thornton (1–5)		24,918	66–86
153	September 17	Chicago White Sox	W 10–3	Teaford (2–0)	Stewart (2–5)	Adcock (1)	31,264	67–86
154	September 18	Chicago White Sox	L 5–10	Danks (7–12)	Chen (11–8)		29,480	67–87
155	September 20	Detroit Tigers	W 10–2	Mendoza (1–0)	Penny (10–11)		26,953	68–87
156	September 21	Detroit Tigers	L 3–6	Fister (10–13)	Herrera (0–1)	Valverde (47)	28,776	68–88
157	September 23	@ Chicago White Sox	W 11–1	Chen (12–8)	Stewart (2–6)		21,744	69–88
158	September 24	@ Chicago White Sox	L 3–6	Danks (8–12)	Teaford (2–1)		26,249	69–89
159	September 25	@ Chicago White Sox	W 2–1	Mendoza (2–0)	Floyd (12–13)	Holland (4)	22,018	70–89
160	September 26	@ Minnesota Twins	W 7–3	Paulino (4–10)	Slowey (0–8)		34,847	71–89
161	September 27	@ Minnesota Twins	L 4–7	Swarzak (4–7)	O'Sullivan (2–6)		34,228	71–90
162	September 28	@ Minnesota Twins	L 0–1	Pavano (9–13)	Wood (5–3)		36,488	71–91

== Roster ==
2011 Kansas City Royals
Roster
Pitchers: 47 Nathan Adcock; 57 Jesse Chavez; 52 Bruce Chen; 46 Louis Coleman; 55 Tim Collins; 43 Aaron Crow; 34 Kyle Davies; 23 Danny Duffy; 26 Jeff Francis; 40 Kelvin Herrera; 44 Luke Hochevar; 56 Greg Holland; 41 Jeremy Jeffress; 32 Vin Mazzaro; 39 Luis Mendoza; 37 Sean O'Sullivan; 39,59 Felipe Paulino; 48 Joakim Soria; 61 Everett Teaford; 51 Robinson Tejeda; 50 Kanekoa Texeira; 38 Blake Wood	Catchers: 3,27 Brayan Peña; 13 Salvador Pérez; 28 Manny Piña; 15 Matt Treanor; Infielders: 13 Mike Avilés; 24 Wilson Betemit; 16 Billy Butler; 2 Alcides Escobar; 17 Chris Getz; 9 Johnny Giavotella; 35 Eric Hosmer; 30 Kila Ka'aihue; 8 Mike Moustakas; 24 Yamaico Navarro	Outfielders: 53 Melky Cabrera; 6 Lorenzo Cain; 1 Jarrod Dyson; 21 Jeff Francoeur; 4 Alex Gordon; 12 Mitch Maier	Manager: 3 Ned Yost; Coaches: 58 Steve Foster (bullpen); 49 John Gibbons (bench); 33 Bob McClure (pitching); 14 Eddie Rodríguez (third base); 36 Kevin Seitzer (hitting); 11 Doug Sisson (first base)

== Player stats ==
=== Batting ===
Note: G = Games played; AB = At bats; R = Runs scored; H = Hits; 2B = Doubles; 3B = Triples; HR = Home runs; RBI = Runs batted in; AVG = Batting average; SB = Stolen bases

Player	G	AB	R	H	2B	3B	HR	RBI	AVG	SB
Melky Cabrera	155	658	102	201	44	5	18	87	.305	20
Alex Gordon	151	611	101	185	45	4	23	87	.303	17
Alcides Escobar	158	548	69	139	21	8	4	46	.254	26
Jeff Francoeur	153	601	77	171	47	4	20	87	.285	22
Billy Butler	159	597	74	174	44	0	19	95	.291	2
Mike Avilés	53	185	14	41	11	3	5	31	.222	10
Kila Ka'aihue	23	82	6	16	4	0	2	6	.195	0
Wilson Betemit	57	203	29	57	15	1	3	27	.281	3
Chris Getz	118	380	50	97	6	3	0	26	.255	21
Matt Treanor	65	186	24	42	6	0	3	21	.226	2
Brayan Peña	72	222	17	55	11	0	3	24	.248	0
Mitch Maier	44	95	19	22	4	3	0	7	.232	1
Jarrod Dyson	26	44	8	9	1	0	0	3	.205	14
Eric Hosmer	128	523	66	153	27	3	19	78	.293	11
Mike Moustakas	89	338	26	89	18	1	5	30	.263	2
Yamaico Navarro	6	23	2	7	1	0	0	6	.304	0
Manny Piña	4	14	2	3	2	0	0	0	.214	0
Johnny Giavotella	46	178	20	44	9	4	2	21	.247	5
Salvador Pérez	39	148	20	49	8	2	3	21	.331	0
Lorenzo Cain	6	22	4	6	1	0	0	1	.273	0
Pitcher Totals	162	14	0	0	0	0	0	1	.000	0
Team totals	162	5672	730	1560	325	41	129	705	.275	153

Stats through September 28, 2011

=== Pitching ===
Note: W = Wins; L = Losses; ERA = Earned run average; G = Games pitched; GS = Games started; SV = Saves; IP = Innings pitched; R = Runs allowed; ER = Earned runs allowed; BB = Walks allowed; SO = Strikeouts

Player	W	L	ERA	G	GS	SV	IP	R	ER	BB	SO
Nate Adcock	1	1	4.62	24	3	1	60.1	34	31	26	36
Jesse Chavez	0	0	10.57	4	0	0	7.2	9	9	5	8
Bruce Chen	12	8	3.77	25	25	0	155.0	71	65	50	97
Louis Coleman	1	4	2.87	48	0	1	59.2	20	19	26	64
Tim Collins	4	4	3.63	68	0	0	67.0	28	27	48	60
Aaron Crow	4	4	2.76	57	0	0	62.0	20	19	31	65
Kyle Davies	1	9	6.75	13	13	0	61.1	52	46	26	50
Danny Duffy	4	8	5.64	20	20	0	105.1	66	66	51	87
Jeff Francis	6	16	4.82	31	31	0	183.0	102	98	39	91
Kelvin Herrera	0	1	13.50	2	0	0	2.0	3	3	0	0
Luke Hochevar	11	11	4.68	31	31	0	198.0	110	103	62	128
Greg Holland	5	1	1.80	46	0	4	60.0	13	12	19	74
Jeremy Jeffress	1	1	4.70	14	0	1	15.1	8	8	11	13
Mitch Maier	0	0	0.00	1	0	0	1.0	0	0	0	0
Luis Mendoza	2	0	1.23	2	2	0	14.2	3	2	5	7
Sean O'Sullivan	2	6	7.25	12	10	0	58.1	52	47	26	19
Felipe Paulino	4	6	4.11	21	20	0	124.2	62	57	48	119
Joakim Soria	5	5	4.03	60	0	28	60.1	29	27	17	60
Everett Teaford	2	1	3.27	26	3	1	44.0	17	16	14	28
Rob Tejeda	0	1	6.14	9	0	0	7.1	5	5	3	2
Kanekoa Texeira	0	0	2.84	6	0	0	6.1	2	2	3	0
Blake Wood	5	3	3.75	55	0	1	69.2	30	29	32	62
Team totals	71	91	4.44	162	162	37	1451.1	762	716	557	1080

Stats through September 28, 2011.

== Farm system ==
Level	Team	League	Manager
AAA	Omaha Storm Chasers	Pacific Coast League	Mike Jirschele
AA	Northwest Arkansas Naturals	Texas League	Brian Poldberg
A	Wilmington Blue Rocks	Carolina League	Brian Rupp
A	Kane County Cougars	Midwest League	Vance Wilson
Rookie	Burlington Royals	Appalachian League	Nelson Liriano
Rookie	AZL Royals	Arizona League	Darryl Kennedy
Rookie	Idaho Falls Chukars	Pioneer League	Brian Buchanan

LEAGUE CHAMPIONS: Omaha
