= Kelly Johnson (baseball) =

American baseball player (born 1982)

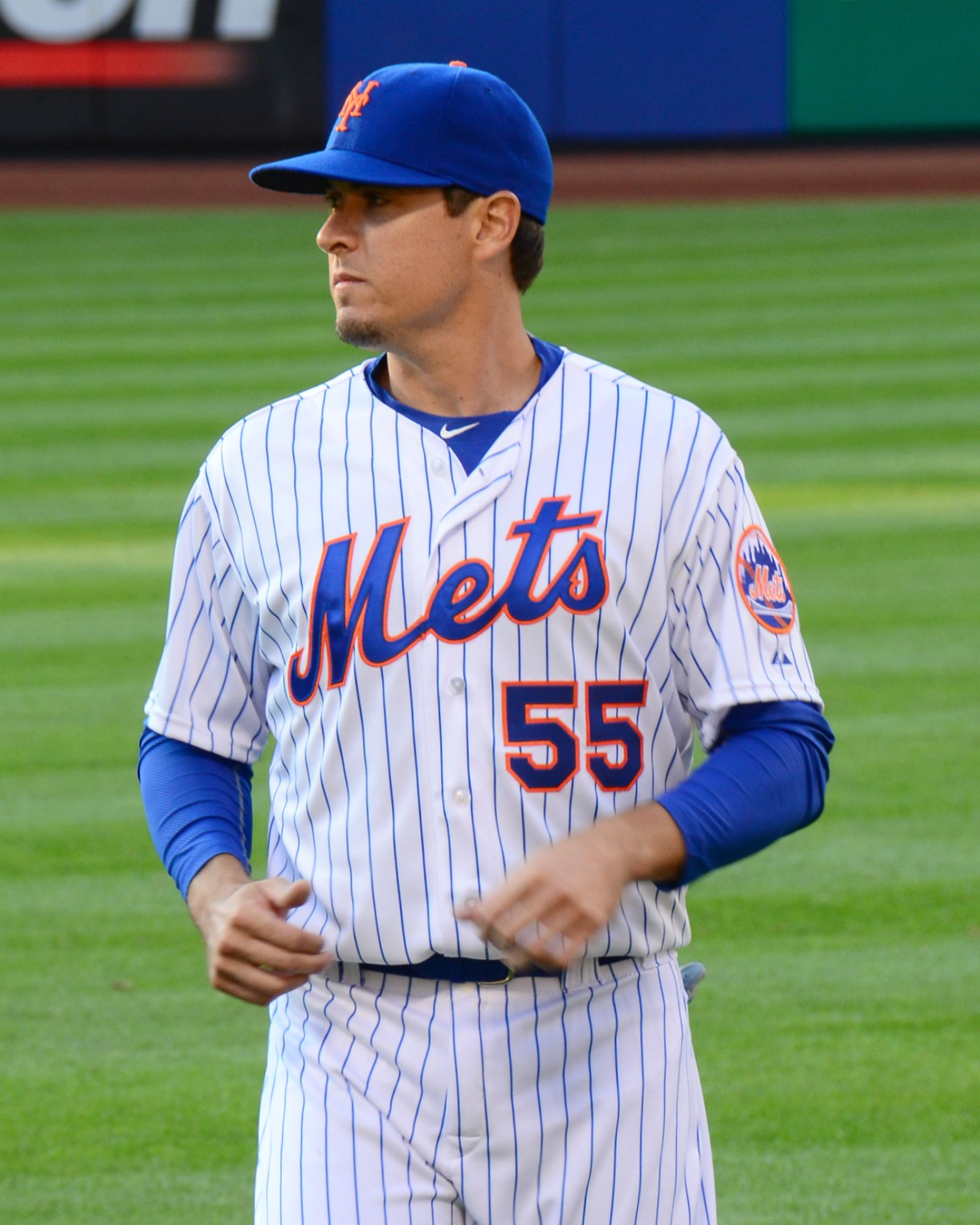
- Johnson with the New York Mets in 2015
- Second baseman
- Born: February 22, 1982 (age 44); Austin, Texas, U.S.
- Batted: Left Threw: Right

MLB debut
- May 29, 2005, for the Atlanta Braves

Last MLB appearance
- October 2, 2016, for the New York Mets

MLB statistics
- Batting average: .251
- Home runs: 155
- Runs batted in: 550
- Stats at Baseball Reference

Teams
- Atlanta Braves (2005, 2007–2009); Arizona Diamondbacks (2010–2011); Toronto Blue Jays (2011–2012); Tampa Bay Rays (2013); New York Yankees (2014); Boston Red Sox (2014); Baltimore Orioles (2014); Atlanta Braves (2015); New York Mets (2015); Atlanta Braves (2016); New York Mets (2016)

Kelly Andrew Johnson (born February 22, 1982) is an American former professional baseball second baseman. He played in Major League Baseball (MLB) for the Atlanta Braves, Arizona Diamondbacks, Toronto Blue Jays, Tampa Bay Rays, New York Yankees, Boston Red Sox, Baltimore Orioles, and New York Mets. While primarily a second baseman, Johnson has appeared at every position except for pitcher, catcher, and center field during his career. Johnson was the first player to appear in a game for all five American League East teams; Steve Pearce became the second in 2018. He was on the New York Mets' postseason roster in 2015, where he appeared in his first World Series.

== Professional career ==
=== Atlanta Braves ===
Johnson was drafted in the first round (38th overall) of the 2000 Major League Baseball draft by the Atlanta Braves. Johnson decided to forego a scholarship offer to play college baseball at Texas A&M in favor of signing with the Braves. Johnson made his Major League debut with the Braves on May 29, 2005, and became a regular outfielder, due to the many injuries that plagued the Braves early in the 2005 season. Johnson was named the National League Player of the Week for the week of June 13 after batting .417 with three home runs and 11 RBIs in 24 at-bats.

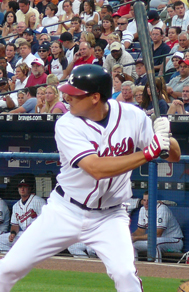
Johnson batting for the Atlanta Braves in 2007

An elbow injury sidelined Johnson for the entire 2006 season. He was placed on the disabled list during spring training after experiencing pain while making throws from the outfield, and had Tommy John surgery performed by Dr. James Andrews on June 1. During the offseason, Johnson spent many hours with Braves first base coach Glenn Hubbard at Turner Field to learn how to play second base effectively. Johnson earned the starting position at second base and as the leadoff hitter for the Braves for the 2007 season. On April 8, 2007, Johnson hit the first leadoff homer of his career in a 3–2 win against the New York Mets. In late June, Johnson lost his position as the leadoff hitter in the Braves lineup. In the 48 games Johnson played in May and June, his on-base percentage was .325, well below the acceptable rate for a good leadoff hitter. Willie Harris, who took over the role as primary leadoff hitter, had an on-base percentage of .440 prior to June 22 (Johnson's last game as the leadoff hitter), prompting Braves manager Bobby Cox to make the change. (As of August 10, Johnson had an on-base percentage of .419 since June 22.) In addition to being demoted from the top of the order, Johnson's offensive struggles motivated Cox to move Johnson into a platoon at second base with Yunel Escobar. He capped off his year with 16 homers and a .276 batting average.

With Escobar taking over full-time at shortstop, Johnson began the year as the Braves second baseman for the 2008 season. Johnson had the longest hitting streak in the National League of the 2008 season, hitting in 22-straight games. He hit .398 with 19 RBIs in 25 games in September. Johnson ended the 2008 season with a .287 batting average, 12 homers, 69 RBIs, 86 runs, and 11 stolen bases.

In 2009, Johnson lost his full-time starting position with the Braves. He increased his contact rate on pitches inside the strike zone, as well as swinging at more pitches outside the strike zone. This pattern is associated with a less-aggressive swing and was associated with his poor results in 2009.

On December 12, 2009, Johnson, was non-tendered by the Atlanta Braves making him a free agent.

=== Arizona Diamondbacks ===
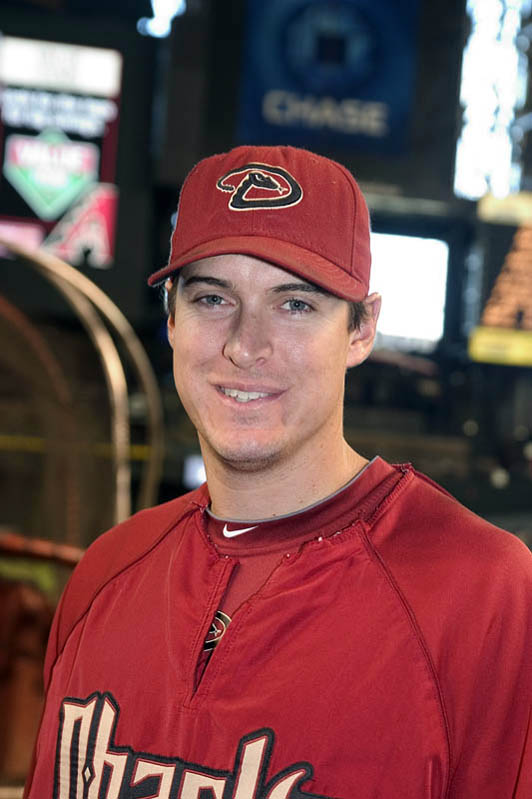
Johnson with the Arizona Diamondbacks in 2011

On December 30, 2009, Johnson signed a one-year, $2.35 million contract with the Arizona Diamondbacks. Arizona had previously shown interest in acquiring Johnson from the Braves. Johnson said this about his new team,

[Phoenix is] just a place I've always liked, it's one of the top for me. Just with the team, we've got guys all over the field that are young, athletic, tons of talent. It's one of the places that you come in and you did not want to face the guys that were on the mound.

— Kelly Johnson, MLB.com: December 30, 2009

He received the Player of the Month award for the month of April, his first month as a player for the Diamondbacks. He earned the award by hitting nine home runs and a .750 slugging percentage. In his first 22 games, Johnson batted .313 (25-80) with 18 RBI, 17 runs scored and a .404 OBP.

On July 23, 2010, Johnson successfully hit for the cycle against the San Francisco Giants. Johnson hit a solo home run in the first, a ground-rule double in the fifth, a two-run triple in the sixth and completed it with a single in the eighth. Johnson tied the game at 1 with his home run, almost tied the game with a double but it was a ground-rule so Young was held at third base, tied the game at 3 with a 2-run triple, and represented the tying run with his single.

On May 21, 2011, Johnson launched a pitch from Minnesota Twins closer Matt Capps deep into the right-field bleachers at Chase Field for a grand slam that capped the Diamondbacks rally from down 6-3 and made the score 9–6, which would be the final score.

On July 8, 2011, Johnson hit his second grand slam in the season off St. Louis Cardinals pitcher Kyle Lohse. Johnson gave the D-backs the lead in the seventh to break a tie 7–3. He hit a 2-2 pitch into the Cardinals bullpen while thinking that he only hit a sacrifice fly. The ball carried long enough to be a grand slam.

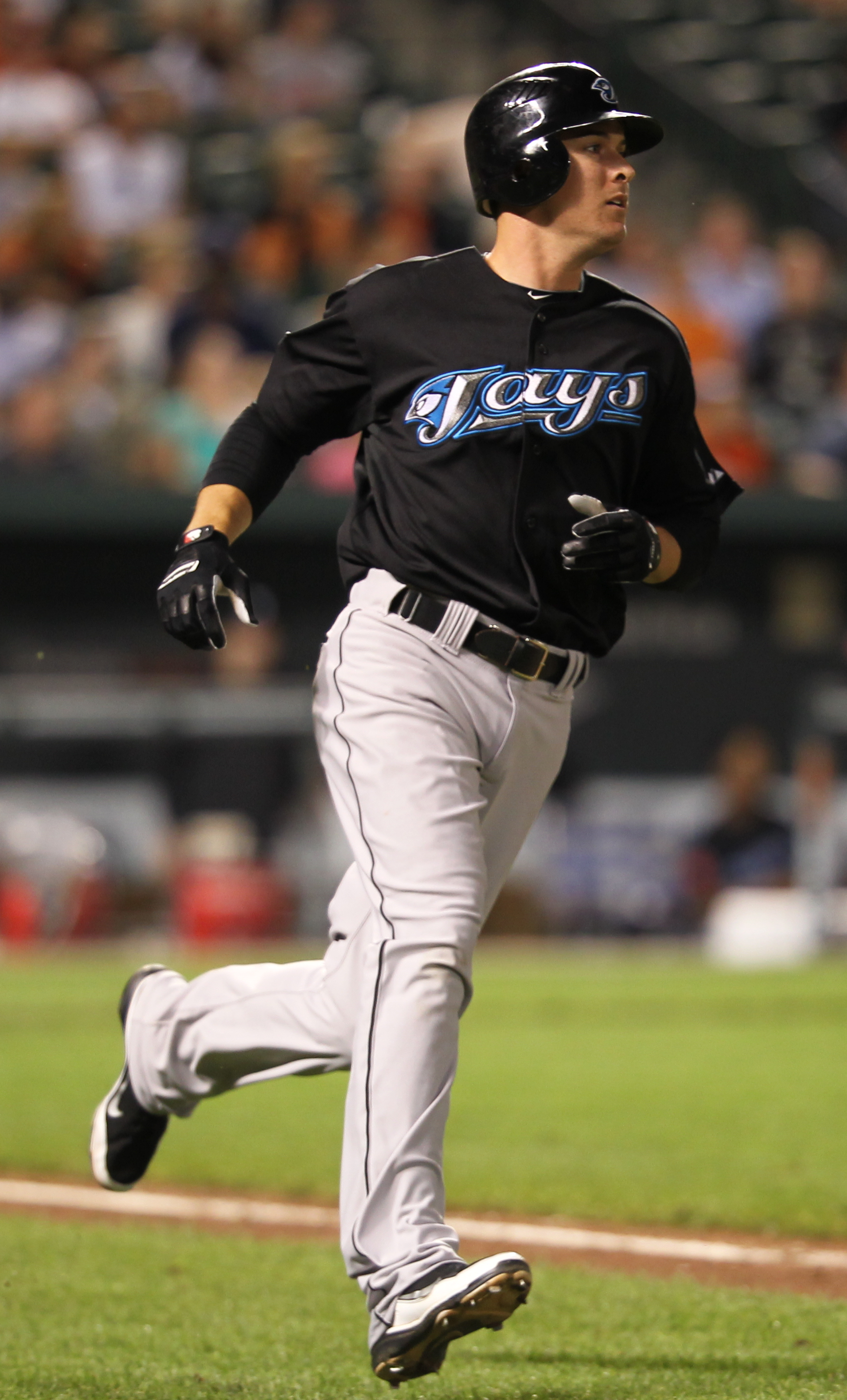
Johnson playing for the Toronto Blue Jays in 2011

=== Toronto Blue Jays ===
On August 23, 2011, Johnson was traded to the Toronto Blue Jays in exchange for second baseman Aaron Hill and shortstop John McDonald. Johnson was set to debut for the Blue Jays on August 24, but had to return to Arizona because he forgot his passport. He made his debut instead on August 25, and went 1 for 2 with 2 walks and a run scored.

Johnson hit his 100th career home run on May 16, 2012.

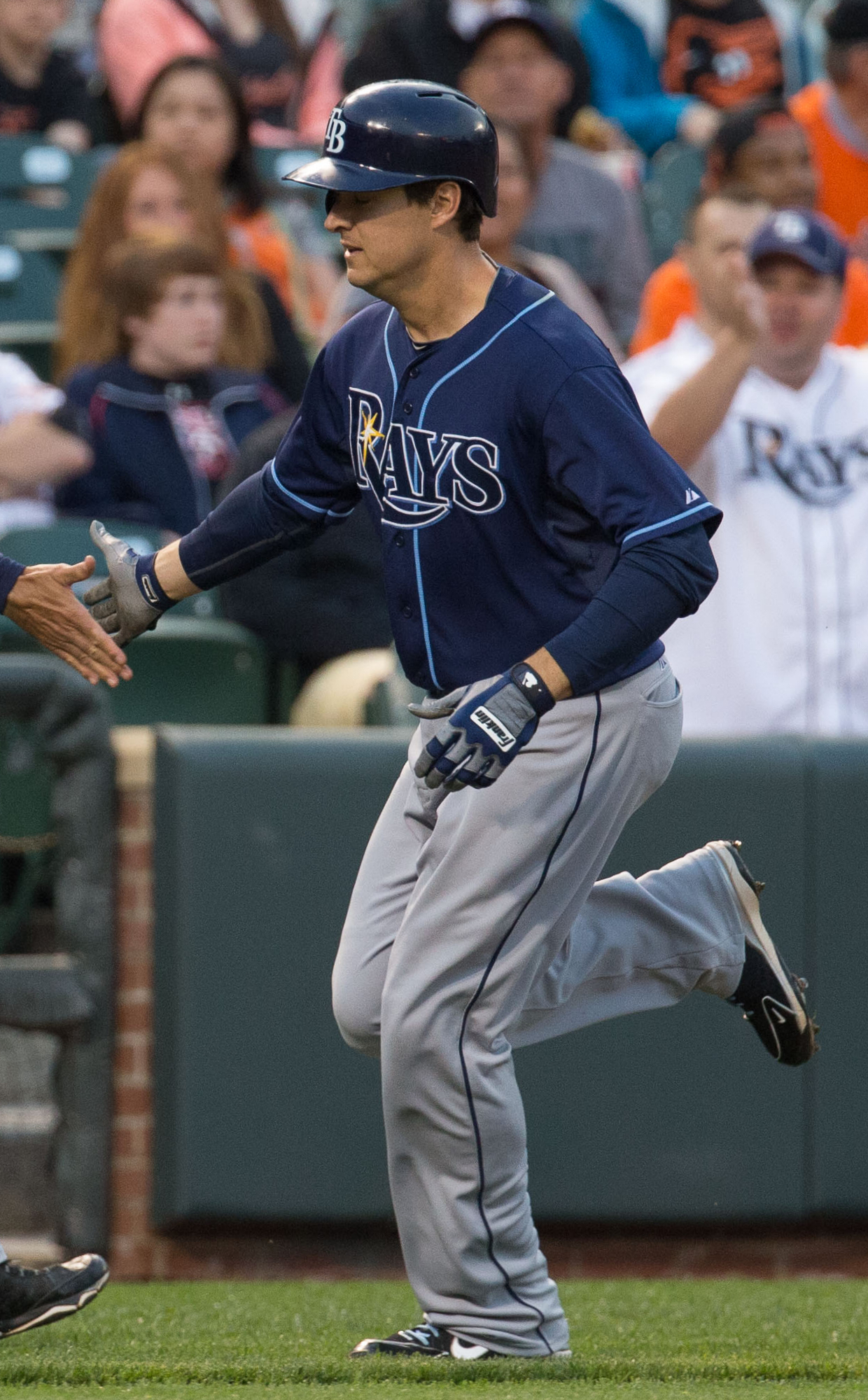
Johnson playing for the Tampa Bay Rays in 2013

=== Tampa Bay Rays ===
In January 2013, the Rays agreed to a one-year contract worth $2.45 million with Johnson. The contract became official on February 5, 2013. Johnson was the Rays Opening Day designated hitter, and throughout the year, he played there, left field, second base, third base, and 3 games at first base. Johnson got 50 starts in left field (the most on the team), splitting time with Matt Joyce and Sean Rodriguez. When he didn't start in left field, he would either come in off the bench, or get a start as a backup at one of the other positions. In 91 at-bats in May, he hit .330 with 7 HR and 26 RBI, and he hit .333 with 4 HR and 9 RBI in July, his only two above-average months. In 118 games in 2013, he hit .235 with 16 HR and 52 RBI. He experienced a severe drop in walks (27 less than 2012) and strikeouts (60 less than 2012), but he also played in 24 fewer games.

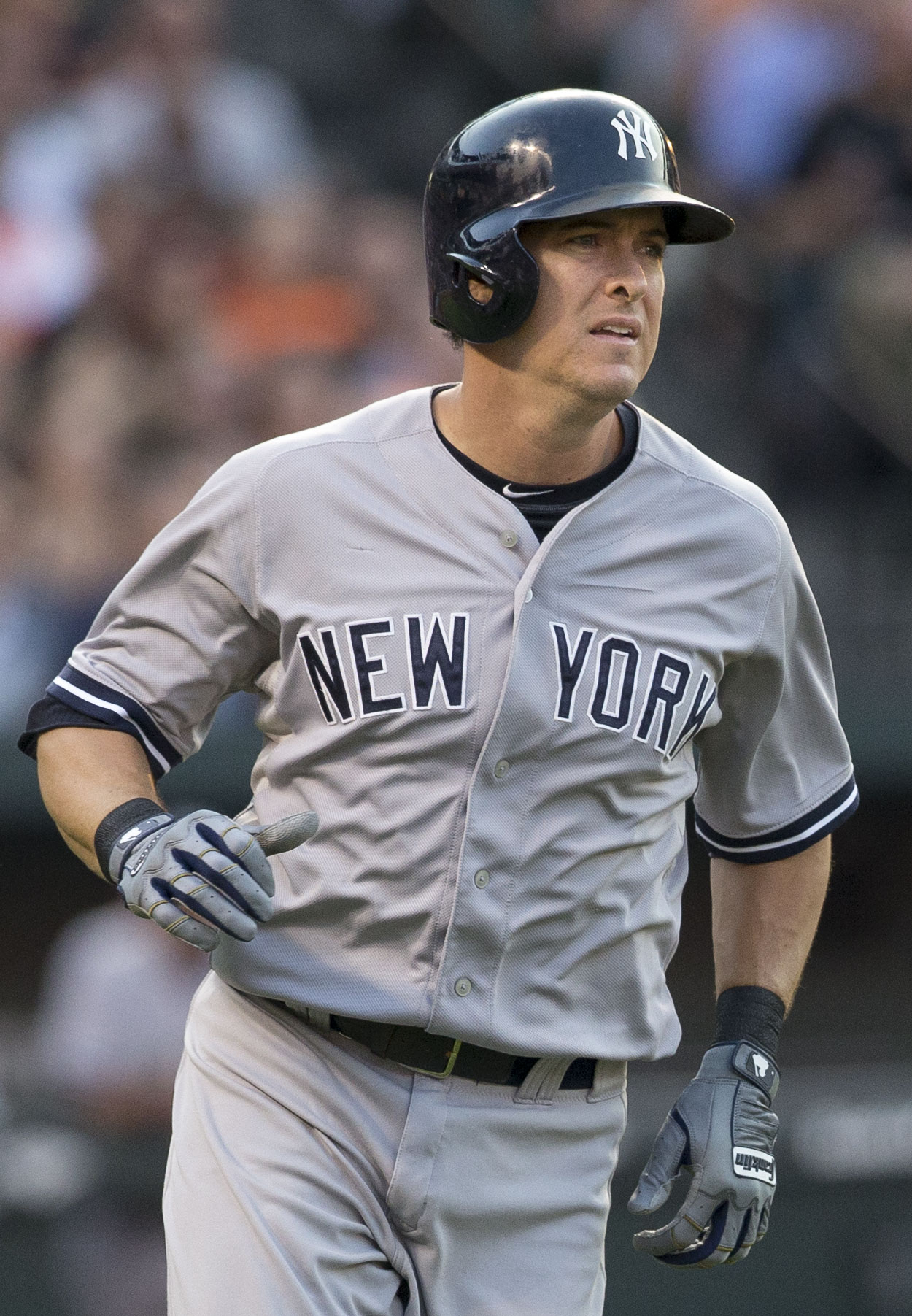
Johnson playing for the New York Yankees in 2014

=== New York Yankees ===
In December 2013, Johnson signed a one-year contract with the New York Yankees worth $3 million. In late July, Johnson suffered a groin injury that placed him on the 15-day DL. Johnson was mostly used as a reserve corner infielder with the Yankees, making 56 starts at the two positions. In 77 games with New York, he hit .219/.304/.373 with 6 HR and 22 RBI.

=== Boston Red Sox ===
The Yankees traded Johnson to the Boston Red Sox for Stephen Drew on July 31, 2014, which was the first trade between the rival teams since 1997. This trade also reunited Johnson with former Blue Jays manager John Farrell. Johnson played in just 10 games with the Red Sox, hitting 4-25 (.160) with a double and 1 RBI.

=== Baltimore Orioles ===
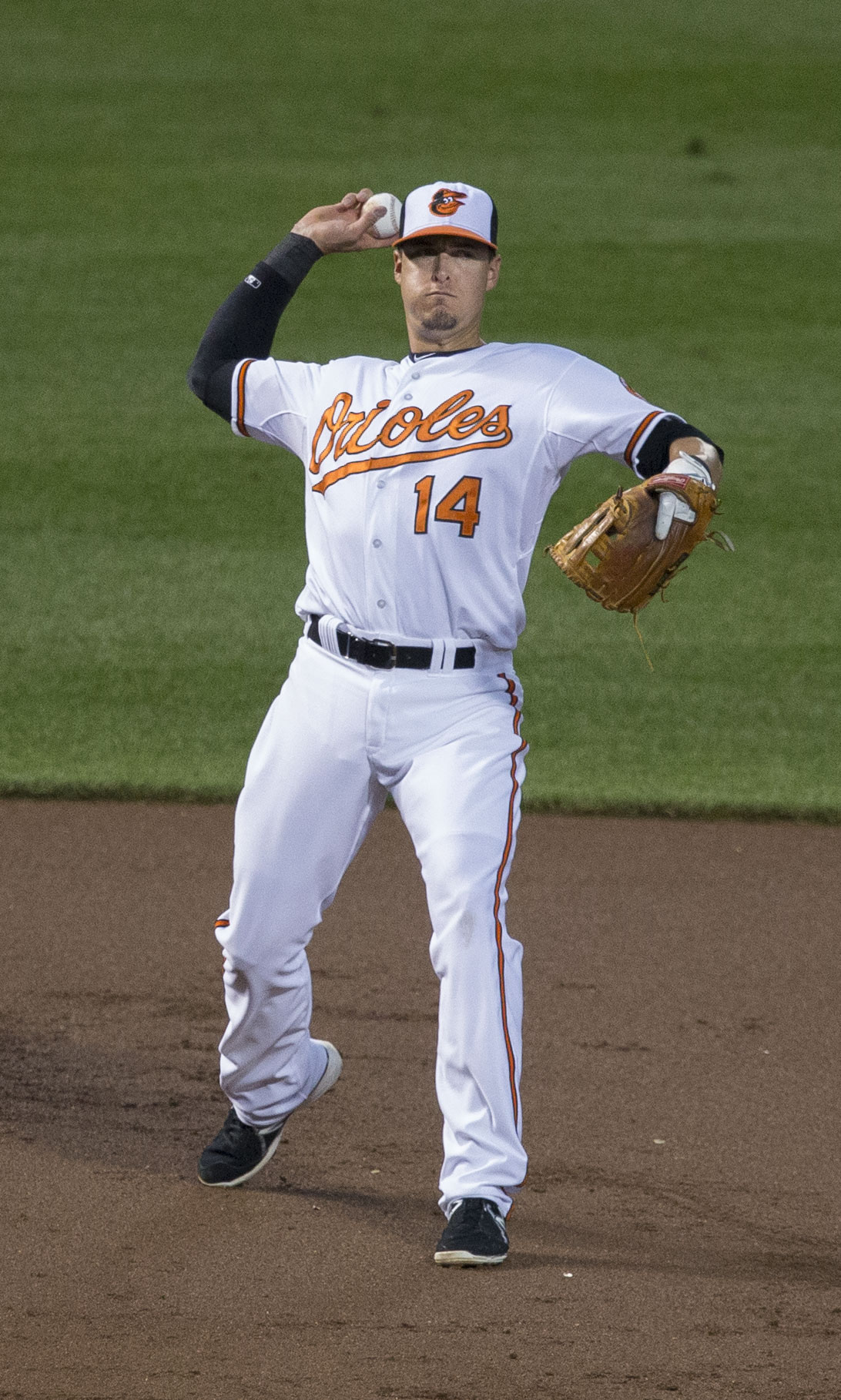
Johnson playing for the Baltimore Orioles in 2014

The Red Sox traded Johnson to the Baltimore Orioles, along with Michael Almanzar, for Ivan De Jesus Jr. and Jemile Weeks on August 30, 2014. He is the first player to play for every AL East team since MLB switched to six divisions in 1994.

=== Atlanta Braves (second stint) ===
On January 21, 2015, Johnson signed a minor league contract with the Atlanta Braves. The deal included an invitation to spring training. On April 4, the team announced that Johnson had made the Opening Day roster. Through his first 28 games with the Braves, Johnson spent most of his playing time at third base and left field. On May 14, 2015, in a game against the Cincinnati Reds, an oblique injury forced Johnson to leave the game after just two pitches in his first and only at bat. He had led the team in home runs at the time with six. He was placed on the DL and remained there until June 10, 2015. After everyday first baseman Freddie Freeman suffered a wrist injury, Johnson often split time at first base with Chris Johnson and Joey Terdoslavich, in addition to playing left field and occasionally at third base.

=== New York Mets ===
On July 24, 2015, the Braves traded Johnson and third baseman Juan Uribe, along with cash considerations, to the New York Mets for minor-league pitchers John Gant and Rob Whalen. In his first game as a Met, he hit a single, a double, and a home run in a 15–2 victory against the Los Angeles Dodgers. With the Mets, Johnson made his first major-league appearance at shortstop.

=== Atlanta Braves (third stint) ===
On January 8, 2016, Johnson again returned to the Braves, signing a one-year deal worth $2 million.

=== New York Mets (second stint) ===
On June 8, 2016, the Braves traded Johnson to the Mets for minor league pitcher Akeel Morris.

== Personal life ==
Johnson and his wife Lauren have four children.

In the summer of 2018, Johnson was among the former MLB players who appeared with the Louisville Stars, a tournament team at the Bluegrass World Series.

== See also ==
- List of Major League Baseball players to hit for the cycle
- List of Toronto Blue Jays team records

Achievements
Preceded by Bengie Molina	Hitting for the cycle July 23, 2010	Succeeded by Carlos González
