= Brad Mills (pitcher) =

American baseball player and coach (born 1985)

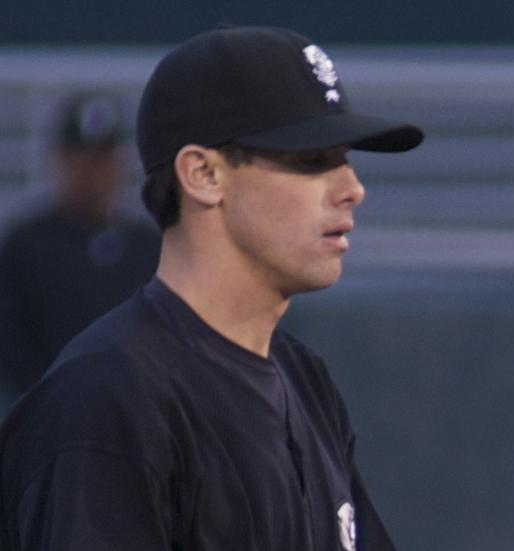
- Mills with the Lansing Lugnuts in 2008
- Pitcher/Coach
- Born: March 5, 1985 (age 40); Mesa, Arizona, U.S.
- Batted: Right Threw: Left

Professional debut
- MLB: June 18, 2009, for the Toronto Blue Jays
- NPB: October 12, 2013, for the Orix Buffaloes

Last appearance
- NPB: October 12, 2013, for the Orix Buffaloes
- MLB: August 14, 2015, for the Oakland Athletics

MLB statistics
- Win–loss record: 4–4
- Earned run average: 7.97
- Strikeouts: 71

NPB statistics
- Win–loss record: 0-1
- Earned run average: 10.12
- Strikeouts: 2
- WHIP: 3.00
- Stats at Baseball Reference

Teams
- Toronto Blue Jays (2009–2011); Los Angeles Angels of Anaheim (2012); Orix Buffaloes (2013); Oakland Athletics (2014); Toronto Blue Jays (2014); Oakland Athletics (2015)

Bradley Aaron Mills (born March 5, 1985) is an American former professional baseball pitcher and current coach. He has played in Major League Baseball (MLB) for the Toronto Blue Jays, Los Angeles Angels of Anaheim, and Oakland Athletics and in Nippon Professional Baseball for the Orix Buffaloes.

== Playing career ==
=== Amateur career ===
Mills graduated from Mountain View High School in Mesa, Arizona, and pitched collegiately for the University of Arizona Wildcats.

=== Toronto Blue Jays ===
Mills was originally selected by the Toronto Blue Jays in the 22nd round (660th overall) in the 2006 amateur draft. Mills, however, chose not to sign with the Jays and instead returned to school for his senior year to complete his degree in civil engineering. After completing his senior season at Arizona, Mills would once again be selected by the Blue Jays, this time in the fourth round (145th overall) of the 2007 amateur entry draft. He began his professional career later in 2007 with the Low–A Auburn Doubledays, posting a 2–0 won-lost record in 18 innings, striking out 21 with an ERA of 2.00. In 2008, Mills achieved the best record by a pitcher in the entire Blue Jays' minor league organization. Splitting his season with three teams (the Single–A Lansing Lugnuts, the High–A Dunedin Blue Jays, and the Double–A New Hampshire Fisher Cats), Mills was 13–5 in 27 games (all starts), with 159 strikeouts over 147 1/3 innings pitched, with an ERA of 1.95. He was chosen a Midwest League Mid-Season All-Star at Lansing. Advancing to the Triple–A Las Vegas 51s for 2009, Mills at the time of his promotion was leading the team in innings pitched with 76 1/3, and had a 1–8 record, a 4.48 ERA, and 65 strikeouts.

The Blue Jays had suffered a string of injuries to many of their pitchers from early 2009 onwards, leading to several promotions from within their minor-league system. On June 17, 2009, Mills' contract was purchased by the Blue Jays. The next day, he made his major league debut by taking over Casey Janssen's scheduled start on the road against the 2008 World Series champion Philadelphia Phillies, giving up four earned runs in 3 2/3 innings.

=== Los Angeles Angels of Anaheim ===
On December 3, 2011, he was traded to the Los Angeles Angels of Anaheim for catcher Jeff Mathis. He made his only appearance for the Angels on July 8 and earned his 3rd career win, pitching five scoreless innings, with no walks and six strikeouts, and three hits allowed.

=== Texas Rangers ===
On March 24, 2013, Mills was claimed off waivers by the Texas Rangers. Mills was assigned to the Rangers' Triple-A team, the Round Rock Express of the Pacific Coast League (PCL), after clearing waivers.

=== Orix Buffaloes ===
Mills signed with the Orix Buffaloes of Nippon Professional Baseball on July 18, 2013.

=== Milwaukee Brewers ===
On January 9, 2014, Mills signed a minor-league contract with the Milwaukee Brewers. Mills was assigned to the Nashville Sounds of the PCL, where in 12 starts, he was 4-2 with a 1.56 ERA.

=== Oakland Athletics ===
On June 17, 2014, Mills was traded to the Oakland Athletics for cash considerations, which was later revealed to be $1. He had an opt-out clause in his contract with the Brewers that allowed Mills to leave the organization for zero compensation if another team put him on their active roster. Mills joined the Athletics starting rotation immediately and made his first start for the A's on June 20 against the Boston Red Sox. On June 25 against the New York Mets, Mills picked up his first win as an Oakland Athletic. He was designated for assignment on July 7, after making 3 starts for Oakland and posting a 1–1 record with a 4.41 earned run average.

=== Toronto Blue Jays (second stint) ===
On July 17, 2014, Mills was claimed off waivers by the Toronto Blue Jays. After allowing 8 runs in 2 innings pitched during a 14–1 loss to the Boston Red Sox, Mills was designated for assignment on July 22. He cleared waivers on July 25, and was assigned to the Triple-A Buffalo Bisons. On August 10, Mills was recalled from Triple-A. After pitching in relief in Seattle on August 11, he was designated for assignment on August 12, and assigned outright to Buffalo on August 14. Altogether, Mills recorded a 27.00 ERA with 5 strikeouts in 4 1/3 innings for the Blue Jays in 2014. He elected free agency after the season ended.

=== Oakland Athletics (second stint) ===
On October 27, 2014, Mills signed a minor league contract with the Oakland Athletics. He was called up from the Triple-A Nashville Sounds on August 14, 2015 to start against the Baltimore Orioles. Mills was designated for assignment on August 15, and assigned outright to Nashville on August 17. He elected to become a free agent following the season.

=== Seattle Mariners ===
On December 17, 2015, Mills signed a minor league deal with the Seattle Mariners. He was released on September 22, 2018.

== Coaching career ==
In December, 2019, the Chicago Cubs hired Mills as a Run Prevention Coordinator.
