= 2015 Miami Marlins season =

2015 Miami Marlins
- League: National League
- Division: East
- Ballpark: Marlins Park
- City: Miami, Florida
- Record: 71–91 (.438)
- Divisional place: 3rd
- Owners: Jeffrey Loria
- President of baseball operations: Michael Hill
- General managers: Dan Jennings, Michael Hill
- Managers: Mike Redmond (through May 17); Dan Jennings (Beginning on May 18)
- Television: Fox Sports Florida; Sun Sports (English: Rich Waltz, Tommy Hutton, Craig Minervini, Frank Forte, Jess Blaylock) (Spanish: Raul Striker Jr., Cookie Rojas)
- Radio: Miami Marlins Radio Network (English) (Dave Van Horne, Glenn Geffner); WAQI (Spanish) (Felo Ramírez, Luis Quintana)

The Miami Marlins' 2015 season was the 23rd season for the Major League Baseball franchise, and the fourth as the "Miami" Marlins. They failed to make the playoffs for the 12th consecutive season.

== Offseason ==
October 30: Rafael Furcal, Kevin Gregg, Reed Johnson, and Brad Penny become free agents.

- Gregg signed with the Cincinnati Reds.
- Penny signed with the Chicago White Sox.

Week of November 3: Signed 5 players to a minor league contract.

Week of November 12: Signed 4 players to a minor league contract and sent Kyle Jensen to the Los Angeles Dodgers for an unnamed players.

November 20: Promoted 5 players from the minors.

November 24: Signed Cole Gillespie to a minor league contract.

November 28: Received Aaron Crow from the Kansas City Royals for Brian Flynn and Reid Redman.

December 1: Signed James Leverton to a minor league contract.

December 2: Signed Chris Narveson to a minor league contract.

December 9: Invited 7 players to Spring training and signed Jhonatan Solano to a minor league contract and invited him to spring training.

December 10: Signed Issac Galloway to a minor league contract.

December 11: Drafted Andrew McKirahan and conducted these trades:

- Received Mat Latos from the Cincinnati Reds for Anthony DeSclafani and Chad Wallach.
- Received Andre Rienzo from the Chicago White Sox for Dan Jennings.
- Received Dee Gordon, Dan Haren, Miguel Rojas, and cash from the Los Angeles Dodgers for Andrew Heaney, Chris Hatcher, Enrique Hernandez, and Austin Barnes.

Week of December 15: Signed 5 players to a minor league contract and invited 1 of them to spring training. Also signed Michael Morse and conducted these trades:

- Received David Phelps and Martín Prado from the New York Yankees for Nathan Eovaldi, Garrett Jones, and Domingo Germán.
- Received Kendry Flores and Luis Castillo from the San Francisco Giants for Casey McGehee.

December 23: Claimed Preston Claiborne off waivers from the Yankees.

Week of January 2: Signed 5 players to a minor league contract and invited 3 of them to spring training.

Week of January 12: Signed 4 players to a minor league contract and invited 3 of them to spring training.

January 20: Signed 2 players to a minor league contract.

January 21: Invited 9 players to spring training.

January 22: Signed Tim Fedroff to a minor league contract.

January 27: Signed Ichiro Suzuki.

February 4: Sent Arquimedes Caminero to the Pittsburgh Pirates for cash.

== Season standings ==
=== National League East ===
NL East
Team	W	L	Pct.	GB	Home	Road
New York Mets	90	72	.556	—	49‍–‍32	41‍–‍40
Washington Nationals	83	79	.512	7	46‍–‍35	37‍–‍44
Miami Marlins	71	91	.438	19	41‍–‍40	30‍–‍51
Atlanta Braves	67	95	.414	23	42‍–‍39	25‍–‍56
Philadelphia Phillies	63	99	.389	27	37‍–‍44	26‍–‍55

=== National League Wild Card ===
Division leaders
Team	W	L	Pct.
St. Louis Cardinals	100	62	.617
Los Angeles Dodgers	92	70	.568
New York Mets	90	72	.556

Wild Card teams (Top 2 teams qualify for postseason)
Team	W	L	Pct.	GB
Pittsburgh Pirates	98	64	.605	+1
Chicago Cubs	97	65	.599	—
San Francisco Giants	84	78	.519	13
Washington Nationals	83	79	.512	14
Arizona Diamondbacks	79	83	.488	18
San Diego Padres	74	88	.457	23
Miami Marlins	71	91	.438	26
Milwaukee Brewers	68	94	.420	29
Colorado Rockies	68	94	.420	29
Atlanta Braves	67	95	.414	30
Cincinnati Reds	64	98	.395	33
Philadelphia Phillies	63	99	.389	34

=== Record vs. opponents ===
2015 National League record Source: MLB Standings Grid – 2015
Team	AZ	ATL	CHC	CIN	COL	LAD	MIA	MIL	NYM	PHI	PIT	SD	SF	STL	WSH	AL
Arizona	—	3–3	2–4	6–1	13–6	6–13	5–2	5–2	2–5	2–4	1–5	9–10	11–8	0–7	3–4	11–9
Atlanta	3–3	—	1–6	3–4	1–6	3–3	10–9	5–2	8–11	11–8	2–4	2–5	3–4	4–2	5–14	6–14
Chicago	4–2	6–1	—	13–6	4–2	3–4	3–3	14–5	7–0	2–5	11–8	3–3	5–2	8–11	4–3	10–10
Cincinnati	1–6	4–3	6–13	—	2–4	1–6	3–4	9–10	0–7	4–2	11–8	2–4	2–5	7–12	5–1	7–13
Colorado	6–13	6–1	2–4	4–2	—	8–11	2–5	5–1	0–7	5–2	1–6	7–12	11–8	3–4	3–3	5–15
Los Angeles	13–6	3–3	4–3	6–1	11–8	—	4–2	4–3	3–4	5–2	1–5	14–5	8–11	2–5	4–2	10–10
Miami	2–5	9–10	3–3	4–3	5–2	2–4	—	4–2	8–11	9–10	1–6	2–5	5–2	1–5	9–10	7–13
Milwaukee	2–5	2–5	5–14	10–9	1–5	3–4	2–4	—	3–3	7–0	10–9	5–2	1–5	6–13	3–4	8–12
New York	5–2	11–8	0–7	7–0	7–0	4–3	11–8	3–3	—	14–5	0–6	2–4	3–3	3–4	11–8	9–11
Philadelphia	4–2	8–11	5–2	2–4	2–5	2–5	10–9	0–7	5–14	—	2–5	5–1	1–5	2–5	7–12	8–12
Pittsburgh	5–1	4–2	8–11	8–11	6–1	5–1	6–1	9–10	6–0	5–2	—	5–2	6–1	9–10	3–4	13–7
San Diego	10–9	5–2	3–3	4–2	12–7	5–14	5–2	2–5	4–2	1–5	2–5	—	8–11	4–3	2–5	7–13
San Francisco	8–11	4–3	2–5	5–2	8–11	11–8	2–5	5–1	3–3	5–1	1–6	11–8	—	2–4	4–3	13–7
St. Louis	7–0	2–4	11–8	12–7	4–3	5–2	5–1	13–6	4–3	5–2	10–9	3–4	4–2	—	4–2	11–9
Washington	4–3	14–5	3–4	1–5	3–3	2–4	10–9	4–3	8–11	12–7	4–3	5–2	3–4	2–4	—	8–12

== Season summary ==
Playing against the St. Louis Cardinals at Busch Stadium on August 14, Ichiro Suzuki tied and passed a hits milestone. Suzuki collected his 4,191st hit in top-level professional baseball off Cardinals starting pitcher Jaime García, matching Ty Cobb. It was Suzuki's 2,913th hit in Major League Baseball, following 1,278 hits in nine seasons in the Nippon Professional Baseball league in Japan. He passed Cobb the next night with two singles off John Lackey.

== In popular culture ==
In the 1989 film Back to the Future Part II, a Major League Baseball team from Miami plays in the 2015 World Series, losing to the Chicago Cubs. Although the city of Miami has created a professional baseball team since 1989, the 2015 team was in the National League and thus, could not have played the Cubs in the World Series. The 2015 Chicago Cubs competed in the National League Championship Series.

== Game log ==
Legend
	Marlins win
	Marlins loss
	Postponement
**Bold**	Marlins team member

Game log (71–91)
April: (10–12)

#	Date/Time	Opponent	Score	Win	Loss	Save	Attendance	Record
1	April 6	Braves	1–2	Teherán (1–0)	**Álvarez** (0–1)	Grilli (1)	36,969	0–1
2	April 7	Braves	2–12	Wood (1–0)	**Latos** (0–1)	—	17,483	0–2
3	April 8	Braves	0–2	Cunniff (1–0)	**Koehler** (0–1)	Grilli (2)	16,127	0–3
4	April 10	Rays	10–9(10)	**Morris** (1–0)	Boxberger (0–1)	—	17,375	1–3
5	April 11	Rays	0–2	Archer (1–1)	Cosart (0–1)	Boxberger (2)	17,830	1–4
6	April 12	Rays	5–8	Karns (1–1)	**Álvarez** (0–2)	Frieri (1)	20,199	1–5
7	April 13	@ Braves	2–3	Miller (1–0)	**Latos** (0–2)	Grilli (4)	13,417	1–6
8	April 14	@ Braves	8–2	**Koehler** (1–1)	Cahill (0–1)	—	15,765	2–6
9	April 15	@ Braves	6–2	**Haren** (1–0)	Stults (0–1)	—	18,342	3–6
10	April 16	@ Mets	5–7	Blevins (1–0)	**Dunn** (0–1)	Familia (4)	20,556	3–7
11	April 17	@ Mets	1–4	Colón (3–0)	**Hand** (0–1)	Familia (5)	38,753	3–8
12	April 18	@ Mets	4–5	DeGrom (2–1)	**Latos** (0–3)	Torres (1)	41,844	3–9
13	April 19	@ Mets	6–7	Harvey (3–0)	**Koehler** (1–2)	Familia (6)	41,234	3–10
14	April 21	@ Phillies	3–7	Williams (1–1)	**Haren** (1–1)	—	21,993	3–11
15	April 22	@ Phillies	6–1	**Cosart** (1–1)	García (1–1)	—	23,417	4–11
16	April 23	@ Phillies	9–1	**Phelps** (1–0)	McGowan (1–1)	—	17,097	5–11
17	April 24	Nationals	3–2	**Morris** (2–0)	Roark (0–2)	**Cishek** (1)	16,259	6–11
18	April 25	Nationals	8–0	**Koehler** (2–2)	Strasburg (1–2)	—	18,129	7–11
19	April 26	Nationals	6–2	**Haren** (2–1)	Gonzalez (1–2)	—	21,433	8–11
20	April 27	Mets	1–3	Torres (1–0)	**Cishek** (0–1)	Familia (9)	18,547	8–12
21	April 28	Mets	4–3	**Morris** (3–0)	Torres (1–1)	**Cishek** (2)	17,255	9–12
22	April 29	Mets	7–3	**Dyson** (1–0)	Colón (4–1)	—	17,076	10–12

May: (10–19)

#	Date/Time	Opponent	Score	Win	Loss	Save	Attendance	Record
23	May 1	Phillies	4–3	**Cishek** (1–1)	Giles (1–1)	—	18,511	11–12
24	May 2	Phillies	7–0	**Haren** (3–1)	Hamels (1–3)	—	33,348	12–12
25	May 3	Phillies	2–6	González (1–1)	**Cosart** (1–2)	—	20,461	12–13
26	May 4	@ Nationals	4–6	Grace (1–0)	**Morris** (3–1)	Roark (1)	24,731	12–14
27	May 5	@ Nationals	2–1	**Latos** (1–3)	Strasburg (2–3)	**Cishek** (3)	25,332	13–14
28	May 6	@ Nationals	5–7	Scherzer (2–3)	**Koehler** (2–3)	Storen (8)	31,417	13–15
29	May 7	@ Giants	7–2	**Haren** (4–1)	Hudson (1–3)	—	41,367	14–15
30	May 8	@ Giants	0–6	Lincecum (3–2)	**Cosart** (1–3)	Petit (1)	41,413	14–16
31	May 9	@ Giants	6–2	**Phelps** (2–0)	Bumgarner (3–2)	—	42,285	15–16
32	May 10	@ Giants	2–3	Casilla (4–0)	**Cishek** (1–2)	—	41,889	15–17
33	May 11	@ Dodgers	3–5	Howell (2–1)	**Cishek** (1–3)	—	44,941	15–18
34	May 12	@ Dodgers	1–11	Bolsinger (1–0)	**Haren** (4–2)	—	49,628	15–19
35	May 13	@ Dodgers	5–4	**Dyson** (2–0)	Liberatore (0–1)	**Ramos** (1)	38,316	16–19
36	May 15	Braves	3–5	Martin (2–2)	**Dunn** (0–2)	Grilli (10)	18,334	16–20
37	May 16	Braves	3–5	Wood (2–2)	**Latos** (1–4)	Grilli (11)	18,166	16–21
38	May 17	Braves	0–6	Miller (5–1)	**Álvarez** (0–3)	—	23,075	16–22
39	May 18	Diamondbacks	2–3 (13)	Reed (1–2)	**Cishek** (1–4)	Burgos (1)	17,526	16–23
40	May 19	Diamondbacks	2–4	Hudson (1–1)	**Dunn** (0–3)	Burgos (2)	16,034	16–24
41	May 20	Diamondbacks	1–6	Anderson (1–1)	**Phelps** (2–1)	—	17,158	16–25
42	May 21	Diamondbacks	6–7	Chafin (2–0)	**Dyson** (2–1)	Ziegler (1)	20,692	16–26
43	May 22	Orioles	5–8	Wilson (1–0)	**Álvarez** (0–4)	Britton (10)	19,977	16–27
44	May 23	Orioles	1–0 (13)	**Capps** (1–0)	McFarland (0–1)	—	21,356	17–27
45	May 24	Orioles	5–2	**Koehler** (3–3)	González (5–3)	**Ramos** (2)	23,834	18–27
46	May 25	@ Pirates	2–4	Morton (0–1)	**Phelps** (2–2)	Melancon (11)	20,046	18–28
47	May 26	@ Pirates	1–5	Locke (3–2)	**Urena** (0–1)	—	20,806	18–29
48	May 27	@ Pirates	2–5	Cole (7–2)	**Dyson** (2–2)	Melancon (12)	33,238	18–30
49	May 29	@ Mets	4–3	**Haren** (5–2)	Harvey (5–3)	**Ramos** (3)	33,880	19–30
50	May 30	@ Mets	9–5	**Dunn** (1–3)	Robles (0–1)	**Ramos** (4)	39,095	20–30
51	May 31	@ Mets	3–4	Colón (8–3)	**Cishek** (1–5)	Familia (15)	28,711	20–31

June: (12–15)

#	Date	Opponent	Score	Win	Loss	Save	Attendance	Record
52	June 1	Cubs	1–5	Hammel (4–2)	**Urena** (0–2)	—	20,964	20–32
53	June 2	Cubs	5–2	**Hand** (1–1)	Hendricks (1–2)	**Ramos** (5)	23,789	21–32
54	June 3	Cubs	7–3	**Haren** (6–2)	Lester (4–4)	—	22,962	22–32
55	June 5	@ Rockies	6–2	**Koehler** (4–3)	Butler (3–6)	**Ramos** (6)	32,091	23–32
56	June 6	@ Rockies	5–10	Rusin (2–0)	**Phelps** (2–3)	—	30,373	23–33
57	June 7	@ Rockies	3–2 (10)	**Dyson** (3–2)	Logan (0–2)	**Ramos** (7)	35,139	24–33
58	June 8	@ Blue Jays	3–11	Estrada (3–3)	**Hand** (1–2)	—	17,582	24–34
59	June 9	@ Blue Jays	3–4	Hendriks (2–0)	**Ramos** (0–1)	—	20,558	24–35
60	June 10	@ Blue Jays	2–7	Copeland (1–0)	**Koehler** (4–4)	—	44,106	24–36
61	June 11	Rockies	6–0	**Phelps** (3–3)	Rusin (2–1)	—	18,003	25–36
62	June 12	Rockies	5–1	**Urena** (1–2)	Kendrick (2–8)	—	20,355	26–36
63	June 13	Rockies	4–1	**Latos** (2–4)	Hale (2–1)	**Ramos** (8)	26,647	27–36
64	June 14	Rockies	1–4	de la Rosa (4–2)	**Haren** (6–3)	Axford (12)	20,879	27–37
65	June 15	Yankees	2–1	**Koehler** (5–4)	Tanaka (4–2)	**Ramos** (9)	33,961	28–37
66	June 16	Yankees	12–2	**Phelps** (4–3)	Eovaldi (5–2)	—	33,083	29–37
67	June 17	@ Yankees	1–2	Pineda (8–3)	**Urena** (1–3)	Betances (4)	43,048	29–38
68	June 18	@ Yankees	4–9	Shreve (4–1)	**Dunn** (1–4)	—	38,239	29–39
69	June 19	@ Reds	0–5	Leake (4–4)	**Haren** (6–4)	—	33,379	29–40
70	June 20	@ Reds	5–0	**Nicolino** (1–0)	DeSclafani (5–5)	—	36,755	30–40
71	June 21	@ Reds	2–5	Lorenzen (3–2)	**Phelps** (4–4)	Chapman (15)	36,780	30–41
72	June 23	Cardinals	3–4	Martinez (8–3)	**Dyson** (3–3)	Rosenthal (22)	21,759	30–42
73	June 24	Cardinals	1–6	García (3–3)	**Latos** (2–5)	—	18,492	30–43
74	June 25	Cardinals	1–5	Lynn (5–4)	**Haren** (6–5)	—	20,733	30–44
75	June 26	Dodgers	1–7	Anderson (4–4)	**Nicolino** (1–1)	—	21,957	30–45
76	June 27	Dodgers	3–2	**Koehler** (6–4)	Kershaw (5–6)	**Ramos** (10)	24,770	31–45
77	June 28	Dodgers	0–2	Greinke (6–2)	**Urena** (1–4)	Jansen (11)	25,147	31–46
78	June 30	Giants	5–3	**Latos** (3–5)	Vogelsong (6–6)	**Ramos** (11)	19,711	32–46

July: (10–14)

#	Date	Opponent	Score	Win	Loss	Save	Attendance	Record
79	July 1	Giants	6–5	**Cishek** (2–5)	Casilla (4–2)	—	19,341	33–46
80	July 2	Giants	5–4	**Fernández** (1–0)	Cain (0–1)	**Ramos** (12)	32,598	34–46
81	July 3	@ Cubs	2–1	**Koehler** (7–4)	Hammel (5–4)	**Ramos** (13)	41,212	35–46
82	July 4	@ Cubs	2–7	Richard (1–0)	**Cosart** (1–4)	—	37,898	35–47
83	July 5	@ Cubs	0–2	Hendricks (4–4)	**Latos** (3–6)	Motte (4)	37,764	35–48
84	July 7	@ Red Sox	3–4	Tazawa (1–3)	**Cishek** (2–6)	Uehara (20)	36,863	35–49
85	July 8	@ Red Sox	3–6	Porcello (5–9)	**Koehler** (7–5)	Uehara (21)	37,009	35–50
86	July 9	Reds	2–0	**Fernández** (2–0)	Lorenzen (3–4)	**Ramos** (14)	25,027	36–50
87	July 10	Reds	0–1	Leake (6–5)	**Phelps** (4–5)	Chapman (18)	22,222	36–51
88	July 11	Reds	14–3	**Conley** (1–0)	Iglesias (1–2)	—	21,052	37–51
89	July 12	Reds	8–1	**Haren** (7–5)	Cueto (6–6)	—	23,842	38–51
90	July 17	@ Phillies	3–6	Giles (4–2)	**Morris** (3–2)	—	23,074	38–52
91	July 18	@ Phillies	1–3	Billingsley (2–3)	**Koehler** (7–6)	Papelbon (15)	23,655	38–53
92	July 19	@ Phillies	7–8	Neris (1–0)	**Ramos** (0–2)	—	21,739	38–54
93	July 20	@ Diamondbacks	1–3	De La Rosa (7–5)	**Phelps** (4–6)	Ziegler (15)	17,668	38–55
94	July 21	@ Diamondbacks	3–0	**Latos** (4–6)	Hellickson (6–6)	**Ramos** (15)	16,983	39–55
95	July 22	@ Diamondbacks	5–3	**Fernández** (3–0)	Ray (3–5)	**Ramos** (16)	15,857	40–55
96	July 23	@ Padres	4–0	**Koehler** (8–6)	Ross (6–8)	—	29,345	41–55
97	July 24	@ Padres	1–3	Cashner (4–10)	**Haren** (7–6)	Kimbrel (27)	25,897	41–56
98	July 25	@ Padres	1–3	Kennedy (6–9)	**Phelps** (4–7)	Kimbrel (28)	37,300	41–57
99	July 26	@ Padres	2–3	Despaigne (4–7)	**Latos** (4–7)	Kimbrel (29)	33,292	41–58
100	July 28	Nationals	4–1	**Fernández** (4–0)	Zimmermann (8–6)	**Ramos** (17)	23,988	42–58
101	July 29	Nationals	2–7	Fister (4–6)	**Koehler** (8–7)		19,513	42–59
102	July 30	Nationals	0–1	Scherzer (11–8)	**Haren** (7–7)	Papelbon (18)	30,068	42–60
103	July 31	Padres	8–3	Maurer (7–3)	**Ramos** (0–3)	—	19,582	42–61

August: (11–18)

#	Date	Opponent	Score	Win	Loss	Save	Attendance	Record
104	August 1	Padres	3–5	Despaigne (5–7)	**Urena** (1–5)	Kimbrel (31)	21,614	42–62
105	August 2	Padres	5–2	**Ramos** (1–3)	Maurer (7–4)	—	25,228	43–62
106	August 3	Mets	1–12	Colón (10–10)	**Koehler** (8–8)	—	23,119	43–63
107	August 4	Mets	1–5	Niese (6–9)	**Dunn** (1–5)	—	23,822	43–64
108	August 5	Mets	6–8	Harvey (10–7)	**Phelps** (4–8)	Familia (29)	25,897	43–65
109	August 6	@ Braves	8–9	McKirahan (1–0)	**Morris** (3–3)	—	18,548	43–66
110	August 7	@ Braves	3–6	Detwiler (1–5)	**Flores** (0–1)	Vizcaíno (2)	22,769	43-67
111	August 8	@ Braves	2–7	Foltynewicz (4–3)	**Koehler** (8–9)	—	42,544	43–68
112	August 9	@ Braves	4–1	**Hand** (2–2)	Miller (5–9)	**Ramos** (18)	24,610	44–68
113	August 11	Red Sox	5–4	**Morris** (4–3)	Breslow (0–2)	—	31,951	45–68
114	August 12	Red Sox	14–6	**Barraclough** (1–0)	Rodriquez (6–5)	—	26,041	46–68
115	August 14	@ Cardinals	1–3	Vizcaíno (5–4)	**Koehler** (8–10)	Rosenthal (36)	42,025	46–69
116	August 15	@ Cardinals	2–6	Lackey (10–7)	**Hand** (2–3)	—	44,706	46–70
117	August 16	@ Cardinals	6–4	**Narveson** (1–0)	Martinez (12–5)	**Ramos** (19)	43,826	47–70
118	August 17	@ Brewers	6–2	**Nicolino** (2–1)	Garza (6–13)	—	21,910	48–70
119	August 18	@ Brewers	9–6	**Flores** (1–1)	Cravy (0–5)	**Ramos** (20)	31,937	49–70
120	August 19	@ Brewers	7–8	Peralta (4–7)	**Koehler** (8–11)	Rodríguez (30)	30,453	49–71
121	August 20	Phillies	9–7	**Hand** (3–3)	Williams (4–9)	**Ramos** (21)	19,689	50–71
122	August 21	Phillies	1–7	Eickhoff (1–0)	**Flores** (1–2)	—	19,391	50–72
123	August 22	Phillies	2–4	Araújo (2–1)	**Ramos** (1–4)	Giles (9)	22,113	50–73
124	August 23	Phillies	0–2	Nola (4–1)	**Conley** (1–1)	Giles (10)	22,693	50–74
125	August 24	Pirates	2–5	Happ (6–7)	**Koehler** (8–12)	Melancon (40)	17,644	50–75
126	August 25	Pirates	5–1	**Hand** (4-3)	Morton (8-5)	**Ramos** (22)	17,371	51–75
127	August 26	Pirates	2–7	Locke (7-8)	**Narveson** (1-1)	—	16,560	51–76
128	August 27	Pirates	1–2	Cole (15-7)	**Nicolino** (2-2)	Melancon (41)	19,950	51–77
129	August 28	@ Nationals	4–3	**Conley** (2–1)	Scherzer (11–11)	**Ramos** (23)	30,892	52–77
130	August 29	@ Nationals	1–5	Zimmermann (11–8)	**Koehler** (8–13)	—	31,519	52–78
131	August 30	@ Nationals	4–7	Fister (5–7)	**Hand** (4–4)	Papelbon (22)	34,488	52–79
132	August 31	@ Braves	4–0	**Narveson** (2-1)	Miller (5-12)	—	12,916	53–79

September: (16–10)

#	Date	Opponent	Score	Win	Loss	Save	Attendance	Record
133	September 1	@ Braves	7–1	**Nicolino** (3-2)	Banuelos (1-3)	—	16,386	54–79
134	September 2	@ Braves	7–3	**Conley** (3-1)	Perez (4-6)	—	17,949	55–79
135	September 4	Mets	6–5	**Ellington** (1-0)	Goeddel (0-1)	—	24,763	56–79
136	September 5	Mets	0–7	Colón (13-11)	**Hand** (4-5)	—	23,135	56–80
137	September 6	Mets	4–3	**Ramos** (2-4)	Clippard (3-4)	—	26,780	57–80
138	September 7	Brewers	1–9	Davies (1-0)	**Nicolino** (3-3)	—	16,804	57–81
139	September 8	Brewers	6–4	**Barraclough** (2-0)	Jungmann (9-6)	**Ramos** (24)	14,958	58–81
140	September 9	Brewers	5–2	**Koehler** (9-13)	Cravy (0-6)	**Ramos** (25)	15,316	59–81
141	September 11	Nationals	2–1	**Dunn** (2–5)	Janssen (1–5)	**Ramos** (26)	17,167	60–81
142	September 12	Nationals	2–0	**Fernández** (5–0)	Roark (4–5)	**Ramos** (27)	20,235	61–81
143	September 13	Nationals	0–5	Scherzer (12–11)	**Hand** (4–6)	—	20,131	61–82
144	September 14	@ Mets	3–4	Robles (4-2)	**Barraclough** (2-1)	Familia (41)	27,320	61–83
145	September 15	@ Mets	9–3	**Koehler** (10-13)	deGrom (13-8)	—	25,633	62–83
146	September 16	@ Mets	6–0	**Conley** (4-1)	Colón (14-12)	—	25,161	63–83
147	September 17	@ Nationals	6–4	**Cosart** (2–4)	Roark (4–6)	**Ramos** (28)	23,606	64–83
148	September 18	@ Nationals	4–5 (10)	Janssen (2–5)	**Ellington** (1–1)	—	27,495	64–84
149	September 19	@ Nationals	2–5	Zimmermann (13–8)	**Hand** (4–7)	Papelbon (24)	32,768	64–85
150	September 20	@ Nationals	3–13	Strasburg (10–7)	**Nicolino** (3–4)	—	28,444	64–86
151	September 22	Phillies	2–6	Harang (6-15)	**Koehler** (10-14)	—	16,742	64–87
152	September 23	Phillies	4–3 (11)	**Ellington** (2-1)	Williams (4-12)	—	15,662	65–87
153	September 24	Phillies	1–0	**Morris** (5-3)	Asher (0-5)	**Ramos** (29)	17,083	66–87
154	September 25	Braves	12–11	**Fernández** (6-0)	Weber (0-2)	**Ramos** (30)	24,626	67–87
155	September 26	Braves	6–2	**Nicolino** (4-4)	Teherán (10-8)	—	24,449	68–87
156	September 27	Braves	9–5	**Koehler** (11-14)	Miller (5-17)	—	27,702	69–87
157	September 29	@ Rays	2–4	Colomé (7-5)	**Morris** (5-4)	Boxberger (39)	9,150	69–88
158	September 30	@ Rays	4–6	Smyly (5-2)	**Cosart** (2-5)	Boxberger (40)	9,431	69–89

October: (2–2)

#	Date	Opponent	Score	Win	Loss	Save	Attendance	Record
159	October 1	@ Rays	1–4	Odorizzi (9-9)	**Fernández** (6-1)	Boxberger (41)	9,657	69–90
160	October 3	@ Phillies	7–6	**Narveson** (3-1)	Giles (6-3)	**Ramos** (31)	16,240	70–90
161	October 3	@ Phillies	5–2	**Nicolino** (5-4)	Asher (0-6)	**Ramos** (32)	16,240	71–90
162	October 4	@ Phillies	2–7	García (4-6)	**Rienzo** (0-1)	—	21,734	71–91

Legend: = Win = Loss = Postponement
Bold = Marlins team member

== Roster ==
2015 Miami Marlins
Roster
Pitchers: 37 Henderson Álvarez; 46 Kyle Barraclough; 22 Carter Capps; 31 Steve Cishek; 61 Adam Conley; 50 Erik Cordier; 23 Jarred Cosart; 40 Mike Dunn; 36 Sam Dyson; 49 Brian Ellington; 16 José Fernández; 63 Kendry Flores; 52 Brad Hand; 15 Dan Haren; 34 Tom Koehler; 35 Mat Latos; 58 Raudel Lazo; 46 Nick Masset; 56 Vin Mazzaro; 56 Scott McGough; 57 Bryan Morris; 45 Chris Narveson; 60 Justin Nicolino; 41 David Phelps; 44 A. J. Ramos; 35 Chris Reed; 24 André Rienzo; 62 José Ureña	Catchers: 6 Jeff Mathis; 20 J. T. Realmuto; 39 Jarrod Saltalamacchia; 8 Jhonatan Solano; 11 Tomás Telis; Infielders: 10 Jeff Baker; 48 Justin Bour; 12 Reid Brignac; 9 Dee Gordon; 3 Adeiny Hechavarria; 30 Don Kelly; 5 Casey McGehee; 38 Mike Morse; 14 Martín Prado; 19 Miguel Rojas; 17 Donovan Solano	Outfielders: 32 Derek Dietrich; 28 Cole Gillespie; 13 Marcell Ozuna; 27 Giancarlo Stanton; 51 Ichiro Suzuki; 1 Jordany Valdespin; 21 Christian Yelich	Manager: 26 Dan Jennings; 11 Mike Redmond; Coaches: 18 Reid Cornelius (bullpen); 2 Brett Butler (third base); 25 Mike Goff (bench); 29 Lenny Harris (third base); 55 Chuck Hernandez (pitching); 7 Perry Hill (first base); 24 Rob Leary (bench); 4 Frank Menechino (hitting); 72 Pat Shine (administrative coach); 75 Jeff Urgelles (bullpen catcher)

== Statistics ==
Through October 4, 2015

=== Batting ===
Note: G = Games played; AB = At bats; R = Runs scored; H = Hits; 2B = Doubles; 3B = Triples; HR = Home runs; RBI = Runs batted in; BB = Base on balls; SO = Strikeouts; AVG = Batting average; SB = Stolen bases

Player	G	AB	R	H	2B	3B	HR	RBI	BB	SO	AVG	SB
Henderson Álvarez, P	4	6	1	2	1	0	0	1	0	1	.333	0
Jeff Baker, 1B	41	72	11	15	3	0	3	8	8	25	.208	0
Justin Bour, 1B	129	409	42	107	20	0	23	73	34	101	.262	0
Reid Brignac, 3B	17	13	2	1	0	0	0	0	3	5	.077	0
Carter Capps, P	30	2	0	1	0	0	0	0	0	1	.500	0
Adam Conley, P	15	18	0	4	0	0	0	1	0	8	.222	0
Jarred Cosart, P	15	17	0	1	0	0	0	1	0	8	.059	0
Derek Dietrich, 3B, LF	90	250	38	64	14	3	10	24	23	65	.256	0
Mike Dunn, P	72	1	0	1	0	0	0	0	0	0	1.000	0
José Fernández, P	11	18	2	3	1	0	1	2	0	4	.167	0
Kendry Flores, P	7	1	0	0	0	0	0	0	0	1	.000	0
Cole Gillespie, OF	67	145	17	42	10	2	2	16	10	27	.290	4
Dee Gordon, 2B	145	615	88	205	24	8	4	46	25	91	.333	58
Brad Hand, P	38	17	1	2	0	0	0	2	0	5	.118	0
Dan Haren, P	22	32	3	5	1	0	0	4	2	12	.156	0
Adeiny Hechavarria, SS	130	470	54	132	17	6	5	48	23	78	.281	7
Don Kelly, 3B, 1B	2	1	0	0	0	0	0	0	0	0	.000	0
Tom Koehler, P	32	50	2	6	1	0	0	1	2	28	.120	0
Mat Latos, P	16	18	0	5	0	0	0	1	0	6	.278	0
Jeff Mathis, C	32	93	9	15	4	1	2	12	7	24	.161	0
Casey McGehee, 1B, 3B	60	110	7	20	7	0	0	9	10	22	.182	1
Michael Morse, 1B	53	160	8	34	4	0	4	12	12	55	.213	0
Chris Narveson, P	15	6	1	0	0	0	0	1	0	4	.000	0
Justin Nicolino, P	13	25	0	1	0	0	0	0	0	8	.040	0
Marcell Ozuna, CF	123	459	47	119	27	0	10	44	30	110	.259	2
David Phelps, P	23	34	0	4	0	0	0	0	0	16	.118	0
Martín Prado, 3B	129	500	52	144	22	2	9	63	37	68	.288	1
J. T. Realmuto, C	126	441	49	114	21	7	10	47	19	70	.259	8
André Rienzo, P	14	2	0	0	0	0	0	0	0	0	.000	0
Miguel Rojas, 3B, 2B, SS	60	142	13	40	7	1	1	17	11	16	.282	0
Jarrod Saltalamacchia, C	9	29	3	2	1	0	1	1	4	12	.069	0
Donovan Solano, 3B, 2B, SS	55	90	6	17	3	1	0	7	1	18	.189	0
Jhonatan Solano, C	7	20	1	1	1	0	0	2	1	1	.050	0
Giancarlo Stanton, RF	74	279	47	74	12	1	27	67	34	95	.265	4
Ichiro Suzuki, OF	153	398	45	91	5	6	1	21	31	51	.229	11
Tomás Telis, C	17	27	1	4	0	0	0	0	1	3	.148	0
José Ureña, P	20	13	0	1	0	0	0	0	0	9	.077	0
Jordany Valdespin, RF	2	4	0	0	0	0	0	0	0	1	.000	0
Christian Yelich, LF	126	476	63	143	30	2	7	44	47	101	.300	16
Team totals	162	5463	613	1420	236	40	120	575	375	1150	.260	112

=== Pitching ===
Note: W = Wins; L = Losses; ERA = Earned run average; G = Games pitched; GS = Games started; SV = Saves; IP = Innings pitched; H = Hits allowed; R = Runs allowed; ER = Earned runs allowed; HR = Home runs allowed; BB = Walks allowed; K = Strikeouts

Player	W	L	ERA	G	GS	SV	IP	H	R	ER	HR	BB	K
Henderson Álvarez	0	4	6.45	4	4	0	22.1	28	18	16	1	7	9
Kyle Barraclough	2	1	2.59	25	0	0	24.1	12	7	7	1	18	30
Carter Capps	1	0	1.16	30	0	0	31.0	18	5	4	2	7	58
Steve Cishek	2	6	4.50	32	0	3	32.0	37	19	16	2	14	28
Adam Conley	4	1	3.76	15	11	0	67.0	65	28	28	7	21	59
Erik Cordier	0	0	5.84	8	0	0	12.1	13	8	8	1	6	7
Jarred Cosart	2	5	4.52	14	13	0	69.2	63	35	35	10	33	47
Mike Dunn	2	5	4.50	72	0	0	54.0	46	27	27	6	29	65
Sam Dyson	3	3	3.68	44	0	0	44.0	41	21	18	3	17	41
Brian Ellington	2	1	2.88	23	0	0	25.0	17	10	8	1	13	18
José Fernández	6	1	2.92	11	11	0	64.2	61	21	21	4	14	79
Kendry Flores	1	2	4.97	7	1	0	12.2	16	8	7	0	4	9
Brad Hand	4	7	5.30	38	12	0	93.1	107	55	55	9	32	67
Dan Haren	7	7	3.42	21	21	0	129.0	116	50	49	21	25	88
Tom Koehler	11	14	4.08	32	31	0	187.1	180	94	85	22	77	137
Mat Latos	4	7	4.48	16	16	0	88.1	85	46	44	8	25	79
Raudel Lazo	0	0	3.18	7	0	0	5.2	5	2	2	1	2	5
Nick Masset	0	0	1.86	8	0	0	9.2	12	3	2	0	1	6
Vin Mazzaro	0	0	3.75	10	0	0	12.0	15	6	5	0	6	6
Scott McGough	0	0	9.45	6	0	0	6.2	12	7	7	0	4	4
Bryan Morris	5	4	3.14	67	0	0	63.0	67	25	22	3	26	47
Chris Narveson	3	1	4.45	15	2	0	30.1	24	15	15	7	9	32
Justin Nicolino	5	4	4.01	12	12	0	74.0	72	33	33	8	20	23
David Phelps	4	8	4.50	23	19	0	112.0	119	59	56	11	33	77
A. J. Ramos	2	4	2.30	71	0	32	70.1	45	18	18	6	26	87
Chris Reed	0	0	4.50	2	0	0	4.0	6	2	2	0	1	1
André Rienzo	0	1	5.95	14	0	0	19.2	17	14	13	2	13	15
Ichiro Suzuki	0	0	9.00	1	0	0	1.0	2	1	1	0	0	0
José Ureña	1	5	5.25	20	9	0	61.2	73	37	36	5	25	28
Team totals	71	91	4.02	162	162	35	1427.0	1374	678	638	141	508	1152

== Farm system ==
Level	Team	League	Manager
AAA	New Orleans Zephyrs	Pacific Coast League	Andy Haines
AA	Jacksonville Suns	Southern League	Dave Berg
A-Advanced	Jupiter Hammerheads	Florida State League	Brian Schneider
A	Greensboro Grasshoppers	South Atlantic League	Kevin Randel
A-Short Season	Batavia Muckdogs	New York–Penn League	Ángel Espada
Rookie	GCL Marlins	Arizona League	Julio Garcia
Rookie	DSL Marlins	Dominican Summer League	Raymond Nunez
