= Dan Jennings =

Dan Jennings may refer to:

- Dan Jennings (manager), baseball executive and manager
- Dan Jennings (pitcher), professional baseball player
