= Emilio Bonifácio =

Dominican baseball player (born 1985)

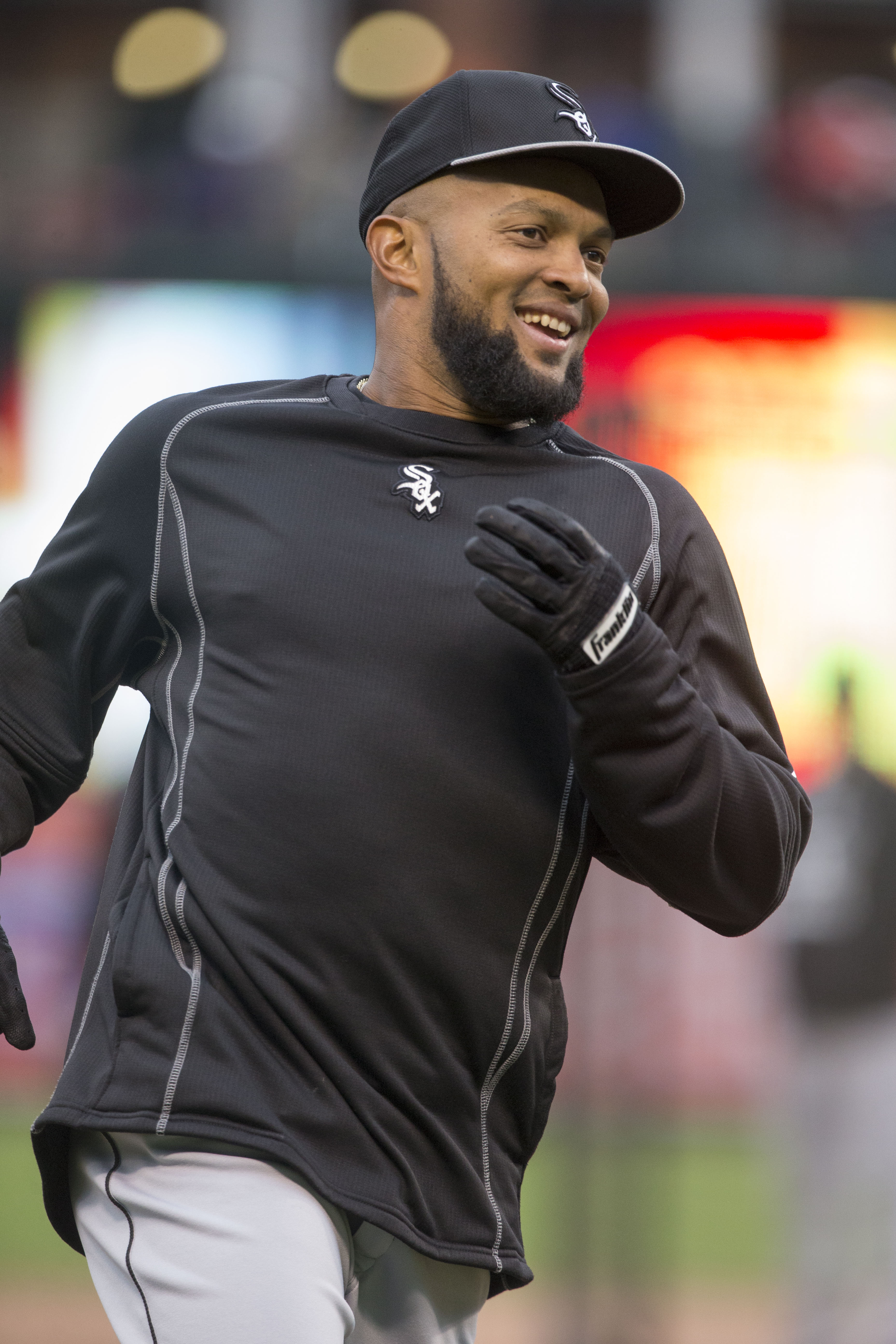
- Bonifácio with the Chicago White Sox in 2015

Tigres del Licey – No. 64
- Utility player
- Born: April 23, 1985 (age 41); Santo Domingo, Dominican Republic
- Bats: Switch Throws: Right

MLB debut
- September 2, 2007, for the Arizona Diamondbacks

MLB statistics (through 2020 season)
- Batting average: .256
- Home runs: 13
- Runs batted in: 165
- Stats at Baseball Reference

Teams
- Arizona Diamondbacks (2007–2008); Washington Nationals (2008); Florida/Miami Marlins (2009–2012); Toronto Blue Jays (2013); Kansas City Royals (2013); Chicago Cubs (2014); Atlanta Braves (2014); Chicago White Sox (2015); Atlanta Braves (2016–2017); Washington Nationals (2020)
Medals
Men's baseball
Representing Dominican Republic
Olympic Games
Bronze medal – third place	2020 Tokyo	Team

Emilio José Bonifácio Del Rosario (born April 23, 1985) is a Dominican professional baseball utility player who is a free agent, and also captains the Tigres del Licey of the Dominican Professional Baseball League. He has previously played in Major League Baseball (MLB) for the Arizona Diamondbacks, Florida/Miami Marlins, Toronto Blue Jays, Kansas City Royals, Chicago Cubs, Chicago White Sox, Atlanta Braves, and Washington Nationals. Primarily a second baseman and center fielder throughout his career, Bonifácio has also played right field and third base.

== Professional career ==
=== Arizona Diamondbacks (2001–2008) ===
On December 27, 2001, Bonifácio signed with the Arizona Diamondbacks as an international free agent. He made his professional debut in 2003 with the rookie-level Missoula Osprey.

Bonifácio played in his first Major League game on September 2, 2007, when he was called up by the Diamondbacks. In 11 games during his rookie campaign, he went 5-for-23 (.217) with no home runs and two RBI. Bonifácio made 8 appearances for the Diamondbacks in 2008, going 2-for-12 (.167) with two RBI and one stolen base.

=== Washington Nationals (2008) ===
On July 22, 2008, Bonifácio was traded from the Diamondbacks to the Washington Nationals in exchange for pitcher Jon Rauch and was optioned to the Triple-A Columbus Clippers.

Bonifácio was called up to the majors (he played for the South Bend Silver Hawks before he entered the majors) by the Nationals on August 1, along with fellow middle infielder Alberto González. Bonifácio went 1 for 4, with an RBI, run, and a stolen base.

=== Florida / Miami Marlins (2009–2012) ===
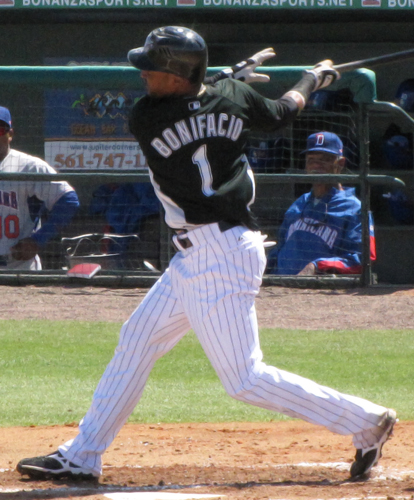
Bonifácio batting for the Florida Marlins in 2009 spring training

On November 11, 2008, he was traded to the Florida Marlins for left fielder Josh Willingham and pitcher Scott Olsen. On March 31, 2009, the Marlins announced that he would be their starting third baseman for the season. Bonifácio hit his first home run on April 5, 2009, an inside-the-park home run on opening day against the Washington Nationals. This home run marked the first time in forty-one years that an inside-the-park home run was hit on Opening Day; the last being hit in 1968 by Carl Yastrzemski.

On May 1, 2011, he hit his first outside the park home run, in a game against the Cincinnati Reds.

He had a 26-game hitting streak and a hit in 30 of 31 games during July 2011, the same month he won Player of the Month for the National League.

During the beginning of the 2012 season, Bonifácio led the major league in stolen bases, was safe in his first 20 attempts. However, on May 21, he was placed on the disabled list after injuring his left thumb trying to steal second base; it was the first time he was caught stealing. Although he was placed on a 15-day DL, he was expected to miss at least 4–6 weeks. Bonifácio was activated on July 13, and replaced teammate Giancarlo Stanton, who went to the disabled list after having surgery on his right knee. He returned to the lineup against the Washington Nationals and went 0–3. On September 4, 2012, Bonifácio was knocked out for the rest of the 2012 season due to a right knee sprain.

=== Toronto Blue Jays (2013) ===
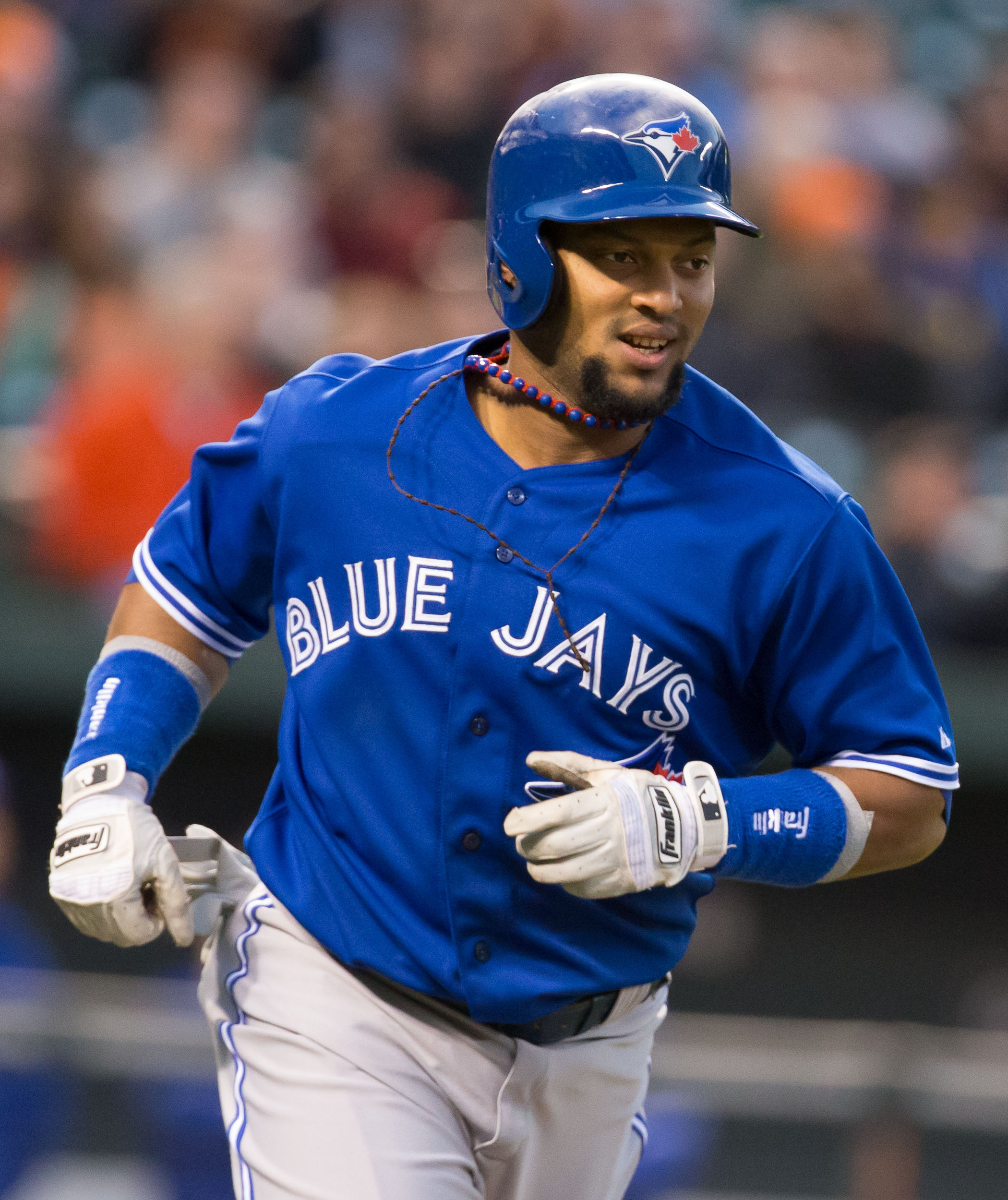
Bonifácio playing for the Toronto Blue Jays in 2013

On November 19, 2012, Bonifácio was traded to the Toronto Blue Jays along with Josh Johnson, José Reyes, John Buck, and Mark Buehrle, in exchange for Jeff Mathis, Adeiny Hechavarria, Henderson Álvarez, Yunel Escobar, Jake Marisnick, Anthony DeSclafani, and Justin Nicolino. On January 18, 2013, it was announced that the Blue Jays had avoided arbitration with Bonifácio, signing him to a one-year contract worth $2.6 million. Bonifácio opened the season as Toronto's second baseman, but he also got time in the outfield at the start of the season, mainly when Maicer Izturis, the opening day third baseman, would play second base. Through April, Izturis had more starts at second base than Bonifácio. After the Opening Day shortstop José Reyes was injured and replacement Munenori Kawasaki struggled, Izturis got more time at shortstop, giving Bonifácio the bulk of the starts at second base in May and June, with Mark DeRosa also getting starts at second. Bonifácio was used more off the bench in July after slumping to a .203 start with 51 strikeouts through the first 3 months of the season. He was used at left field more when Melky Cabrera hurt his knee on August 1, and he also got time at center field when Colby Rasmus hurt his oblique on August 11. In 94 games with the Blue Jays, he hit .218 with 3 HR, 20 RBI and 66 strikeouts.

=== Kansas City Royals (2013) ===
On August 14, 2013, Bonifácio was traded to the Kansas City Royals in exchange for cash or a player to be named later. Bonifácio recorded his 500th career hit on August 17, 2013. Bonifácio was used mostly at second base with the Royals in 2013, but also saw time at third base and center field. In 42 games with the Royals in 2013, he hit .285 with 8 XBH, 11 RBI and 21 runs. Overall in 2013 (136 games), he hit .243 with 3 HR, 31 RBI, 54 runs, 103 strikeouts. Due to Bonifácio's outstanding speed in 2013, Emilio stole 28 bases in 36 attempts. He was designated for assignment on February 1, 2014, and released on February 12.

=== Chicago Cubs (2014) ===
Bonifácio was signed to a minor league contract by the Chicago Cubs on February 15, 2014. On March 30, 2014, the Cubs announced that he had made the opening day roster. Bonifácio hit his first home run as a Cub on June 7, snapping the longest homer-less streak of any active player, excluding pitchers. Bonifácio holds the record for most hits in his first seven games as a Cub, with 17.

=== Atlanta Braves (2014) ===
On July 31, 2014, Bonifácio was traded along with James Russell to the Atlanta Braves in exchange for catching prospect Víctor Caratini.

=== Chicago White Sox (2015) ===
On January 8, 2015, Bonifácio signed a one-year, $4 million, contract with the Chicago White Sox. He was placed on the disabled list on July 29, and reinstated on August 14. Bonifácio was designated for assignment on August 16, 2015 and released two days later. In 2015 with the White Sox he batted .167/.198/.192 in 78 at bats.

=== Chicago Cubs (second stint) ===
On August 25, 2015, Bonifácio signed a minor league contract to return to the Chicago Cubs. In 13 games for the Triple-A Iowa Cubs, he slashed .469/.544/.510 with no home runs, three RBI, and six stolen bases.

=== Second stint with the Braves (2016–2017) ===
On December 18, 2015, Bonifácio signed a one-year contract worth $1.25 million to return to the Atlanta Braves. The team designated him for assignment on April 2, 2016, and he was officially released on April 6. The Braves resigned Bonifácio to a minor league contract on April 10, 2016. The Braves purchased his contract on May 1. However, Bonifácio was not eligible for a call up until May 7, as Major League Baseball ruled that the team had to wait 30 days after Bonifacio's release date of April 6 to recall him. Bonifácio was designated him for assignment for the second time on July 7. In 2016 with the Braves he batted .211/.268/.211 in 38 at bats. In December 2016, Bonifácio signed a new minor league contract with the Braves organization.

In 2017 with the Braves, Bonifácio batted .132/.150/.211 in 38 at bats. He was designated for assignment on June 2, 2017, and released on June 6.

=== Arizona Diamondbacks (second stint) ===
On July 31, 2017, Bonifácio signed a minor league contract with the Arizona Diamondbacks organization. In 28 games split between the Double–A Jackson Generals and the Triple–A Reno Aces, Bonifacio hit .302/.336/.425 with 1 home run, 7 RBI, and 9 stolen bases. He elected free agency following the season on November 6.

=== Long Island Ducks ===
On May 8, 2018, Bonifácio signed with the Long Island Ducks of the Atlantic League of Professional Baseball. In 70 games for the Ducks, he batted .348/.385/.458 with three home runs, 36 RBI, and 20 stolen bases.

=== Milwaukee Brewers ===
On August 31, 2018, Bonifácio signed a minor league contract with the Milwaukee Brewers. In five games for the Triple–A Colorado Springs SkySox, he went 3–for–13 (.231) with three RBI. Bonifácio elected free agency on November 2.

=== Tampa Bay Rays ===
On January 28, 2019, Bonifácio signed a minor league contract with the Tampa Bay Rays that included an invitation to spring training. He was released on March 29, but re–signed with the Rays on another minor league contract on April 3. In 76 games for the Triple–A Durham Bulls, Bonifácio slashed .286/.353/.475 with eight home runs, 36 RBI, and 15 stolen bases. He elected free agency following the season on November 4.

=== Second stint with Nationals (2020) ===
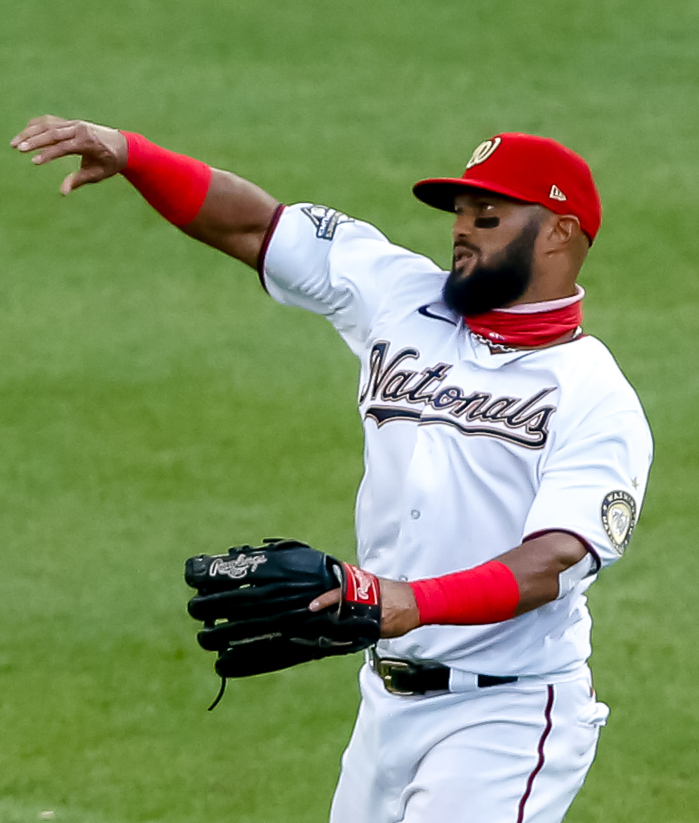
Bonifácio with the Nationals in July 2020

On January 28, 2020, Bonifácio signed a minor league contract with the Washington Nationals organization. On July 23, Bonifacio was selected to Washington's Opening Day roster for the truncated 2020 season. In 3 games for the Nationals, he went 0-for-3 with no home runs or RBI. On August 6, Bonifácio was designated for assignment by Washington. He elected free agency on August 8.

=== Toros de Tijuana ===
On February 3, 2025, after four years of inactivity, Bonifácio signed with the Toros de Tijuana of the Mexican League. In 36 appearances for Tijuana, he slashed .211/.353/.298 with eight home runs, 10 RBI, and three stolen bases. Bonifácio was released by the Toros on July 5.

=== Rieleros de Aguascalientes ===
On July 8, 2025, Bonifácio was claimed off waivers by the Rieleros de Aguascalientes of the Mexican League. In three games for Aguascalientes, he went 3-for-13 (.231) with one home run, one RBI, and one walk. Bonifácio was released by the Rieleros on July 11.

=== Guerreros de Oaxaca ===
On July 11, 2025, Bonifácio signed with the Guerreros de Oaxaca of the Mexican League. In 10 games he hit .472/.568/.667 with 1 home run, 8 RBIs and 3 stolen bases. He became a free agent following the season.

=== Tigres del Licey ===
Emilio Bonifacio began playing regularly for Tigres del Licey in 2006, quickly establishing himself as a speedy and versatile contributor. Through the late 2000s, he became a crucial player in the lineup, often batting leadoff and providing consistent offense and defense. His MLB commitments occasionally limited his availability, but he remained a reliable postseason presence. After 2011, he started playing outfield, however he only manages to excel in center field as in left field is very difficult for him, and while he's more effective in right field than in left, he struggles in both corner positions compared to center. By the mid-2010s, Bonifacio transitioned into a leadership role, becoming team captain and mentoring younger players. He was known for his energy, professionalism, and ability to perform in high-pressure situations. In the 2020s, his playing time decreased, but he continued to be used strategically, especially in playoff scenarios. In the 2024–2025 season, he played 66 games across all stages, including regular season, semifinals, and finals. Despite being 40+ years old currently, Bonifacio remained active and influential, rejoining Licey's training camp and continuing to lead the team, he is still playing in the regular season. On November 4th,2026, Bonifacio collected his LIDOM's career hit number 500 becoming the 26th player to do that in the league.

== Personal life ==
His younger brother, Jorge Bonifacio, also plays professional baseball.

As a kid, growing up in the city of Santo Domingo, he started learning to play baseball in a small baseball field located a street below "el Parque Mirador Sur", where kids of all ages played for the league "Abraham" ("Liga Abraham" in Spanish).
