= Justin Nicolino =

American baseball player (born 1991)

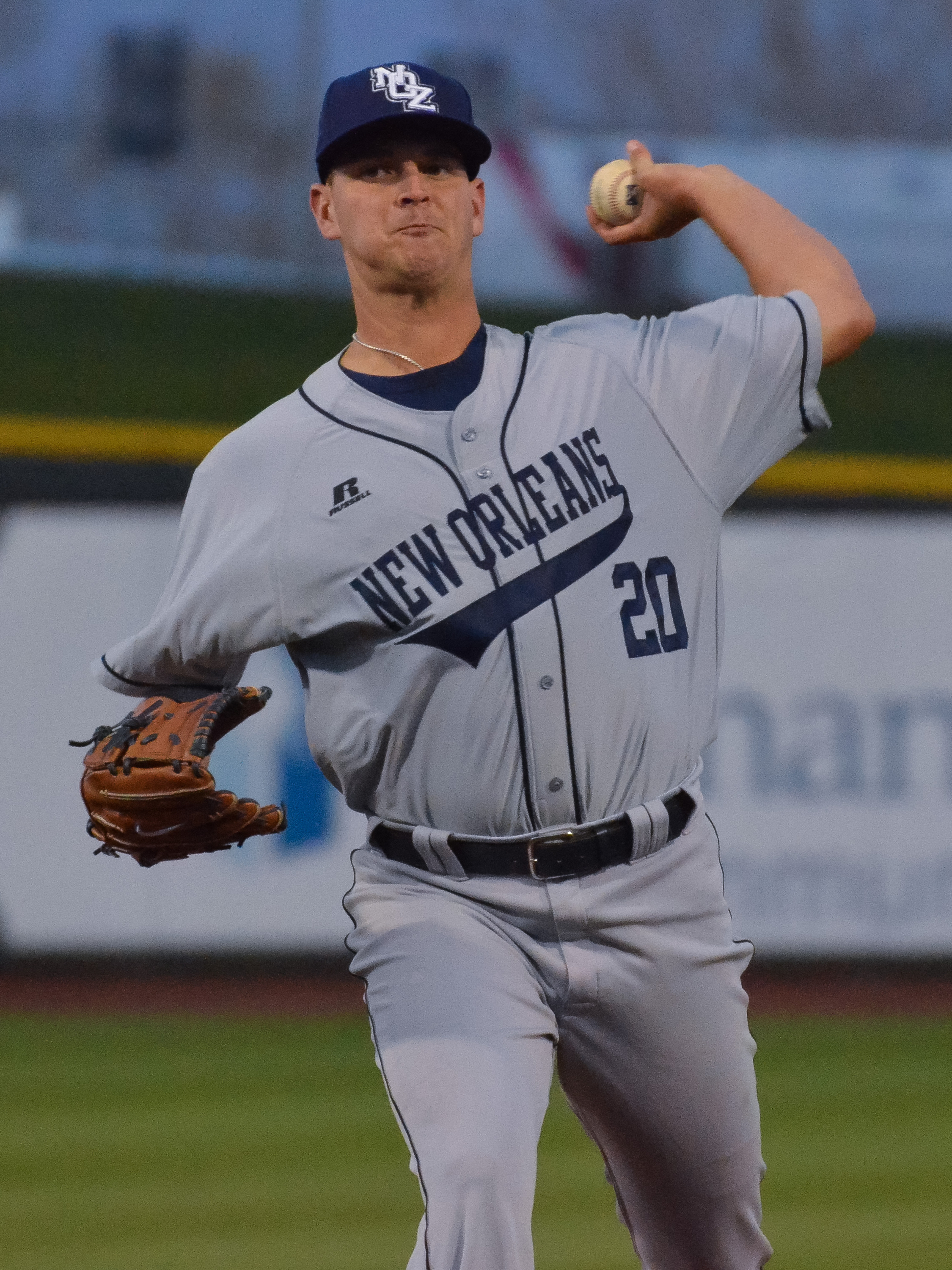
- Nicolino pitching for the New Orleans Zephyrs in 2016
- Pitcher
- Born: November 22, 1991 (age 34); Orlando, Florida, U.S.
- Batted: Left Threw: Left

Professional debut
- MLB: June 20, 2015, for the Miami Marlins
- CPBL: April 27, 2020, for the Rakuten Monkeys

Last appearance
- MLB: October 1, 2017, for the Miami Marlins
- CPBL: July 12, 2020, for the Rakuten Monkeys

MLB statistics
- Win–loss record: 10–13
- Earned run average: 4.65
- Strikeouts: 86

CPBL statistics
- Win–loss record: 1–3
- Earned run average: 5.90
- Strikeouts: 39
- Stats at Baseball Reference

Teams
- Miami Marlins (2015–2017); Rakuten Monkeys (2020)

Justin Brian Nicolino (born November 22, 1991) is an American former professional baseball pitcher. He played in Major League Baseball (MLB) for the Miami Marlins, and in the Chinese Professional Baseball League (CPBL) for the Rakuten Monkeys.

== Early life and education ==
Nicolino attended University High School in Orlando, Florida. Playing for the school's baseball team, he had a 4–2 win–loss record and a 1.95 earned run average (ERA) with 74 strikeouts in 44 innings pitched in his senior year. He committed to attend the University of Virginia on a college baseball scholarship. Projected as a third or fourth round pick in the 2010 Major League Baseball draft, Nicolino expected to honor the commitment.

The Toronto Blue Jays selected Nicolino in the second round of the 2010 Major League Baseball draft, with the 80th overall selection. He signed with the Blue Jays for a reported $615,000 signing bonus, rather than enroll at the University of Virginia.

== Professional career ==
=== Toronto Blue Jays ===
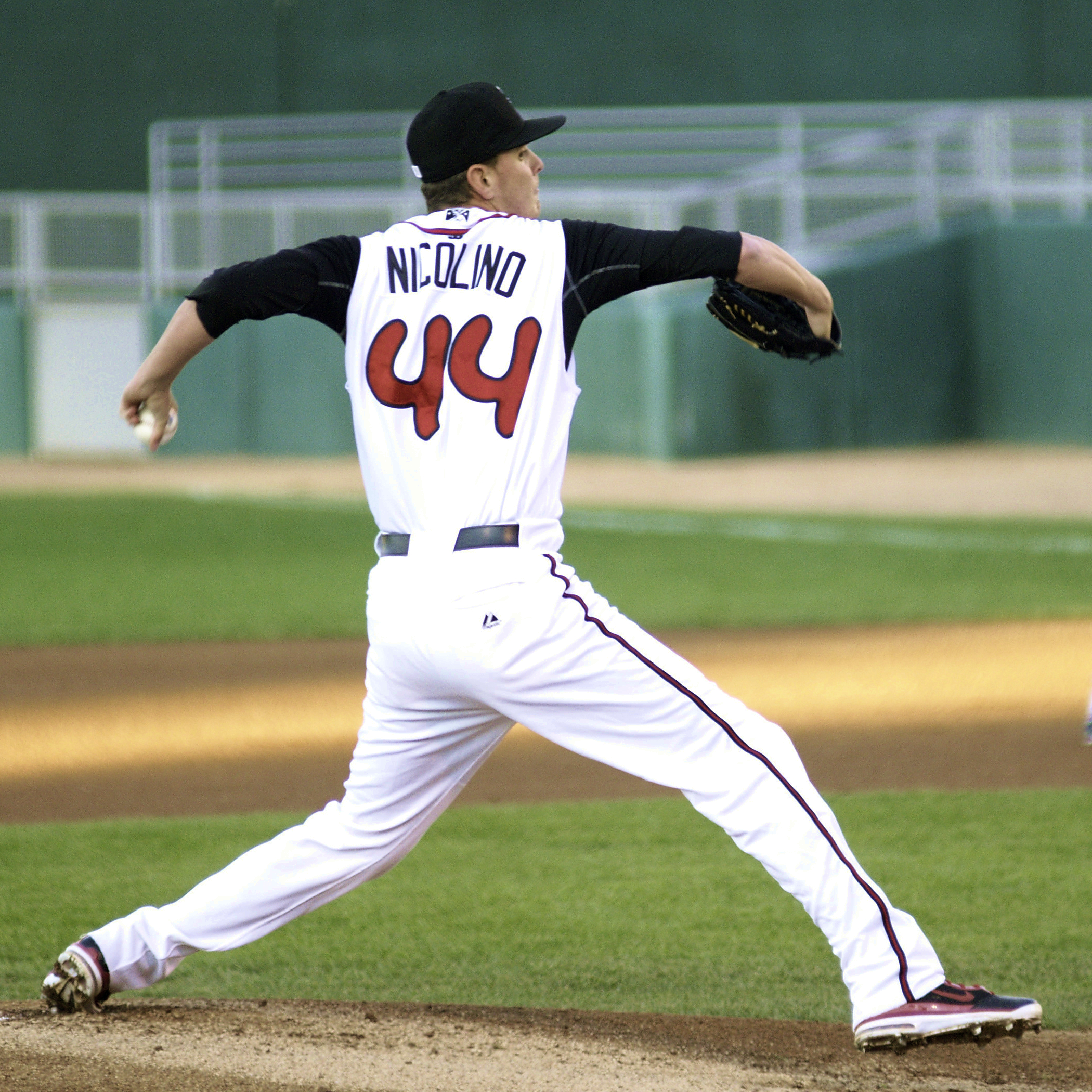
Nicolino pitching for the Lansing Lugnuts in 2011

Nicolino made his professional debut for the Vancouver Canadians of the Low–A Northwest League in 2011, posting a 5–1 win–loss record and a 1.03 ERA. The Blue Jays promoted him to the Lansing Lugnuts of the Single–A Midwest League late in the season, and he pitched to a 1–1 record and a 3.12 ERA in three starts for Lansing. Nicolino returned to Lansing for the 2012 season. He had a 10–4 win–loss record with a Midwest League-best 2.46 ERA and 119 strikeouts in 124 1/3 innings pitched. His teammates voted him as the Lugnuts' Most Valuable Player, and he was named to the Midwest League Postseason All-Star team.

=== Miami Marlins ===
On November 19, 2012, the Blue Jays traded Nicolino, Adeiny Hechavarria, Henderson Álvarez, Yunel Escobar, Jeff Mathis, Anthony DeSclafani, and Jake Marisnick to the Miami Marlins in exchange for Mark Buehrle, Josh Johnson, José Reyes, John Buck, and Emilio Bonifacio. On January 29, 2013, Nicolino was named number 72 on MLB's Top 100 Prospects list. He began the 2013 season with the Jupiter Hammerheads of the High–A Florida State League (FSL). After pitching to a 5–2 record with a 2.23 ERA, and being named a FSL All-Star, he received a promotion to the Jacksonville Suns of the Double–A Southern League in July. Pitching for Jacksonville in 2014, Nicolino had a went 14–4 with a 2.85 ERA in 28 starts, and was named the Marlins' Minor League Pitcher of the Year. On November 20, 2014, the Marlins added Nicolino to their 40-man roster to protect him from the Rule 5 draft.

Nicolino began the 2015 season with the New Orleans Zephyrs of the Triple–A Pacific Coast League. The Marlins called up Nicolino for his first major league start on June 20, 2015, taking the rotation spot of Tom Koehler. He pitched 7 shutout innings, giving up 4 hits and 2 walks, with 2 strikeouts. He was optioned back to Triple–A on June 30. He finished the season 5–4 with a 4.01 ERA in 12 starts for the Marlins. He struck out 23 in 74 innings.

In 2016, Nicolino pitched in 5 games out of the bullpen, while starting 13 for the Marlins. He finished with a 3–6 record and a 4.99 ERA on the season.

In 2017, Nicolino was placed on the disabled list on May 30 with a contusion on his left index finger. Nicolino pitched in 12 games out of the bullpen, while starting 8 for the Marlins. He finished with a 2–3 record and a 5.06 ERA on the 2017 season.

In his career with the Marlins, Nicolino, was 10–13 with a 4.65 ERA in 50 games, including 33 starts, and in spring training in 2018 with the Marlins he had a 5.23 ERA in five games.

=== Cincinnati Reds ===
On March 25, 2018, Nicolino was claimed off waivers by the Cincinnati Reds. Two days later, he was removed from the 40-man roster and sent outright to the Triple-A Louisville Bats. In 25 games (24 starts) for Louisville, Nicolino compiled a 6–6 record and 4.69 ERA with 86 strikeouts across 134 1/3 innings of work. He elected free agency following the season on November 2.

=== Minnesota Twins ===
On February 6, 2019, Nicolino signed a minor league contract with the Minnesota Twins that included an invitation to spring training. He opened the season with the Triple–A Rochester Red Wings, posting a 5.12 ERA with 13 strikeouts in 4 games (3 starts). Nicolino was released by the organization on May 1.

=== Chicago White Sox ===
On May 4, 2019, Nicolino signed a minor league contract with the Chicago White Sox. In 20 games (19 starts) for the Triple–A Charlotte Knights, he posted a 7–6 record and 6.28 ERA with 84 strikeouts across 116 innings of work. Nicolino elected free agency following the season on November 4.

=== Rakuten Monkeys ===
On February 13, 2020, Nicolino signed with the Rakuten Monkeys of the Chinese Professional Baseball League. In 8 games for Rakuten, he recorded a 5.90 ERA with 39 strikeouts across 39 2/3 innings pitched. On September 9, Nicolino was released by the Monkeys.

=== High Point Rockers ===
On April 21, 2022, Nicolino signed with the High Point Rockers. In 6 starts, he posted a 4–1 record with a 2.06 ERA and 29 strikeouts in 35 innings.

=== Cincinnati Reds (second stint) ===
On May 25, 2022, Nicolino's contract was purchased by the Cincinnati Reds and he was assigned to the Triple–A Louisville Bats. In 20 games (18 starts) for Louisville, Nicolino posted a 4–6 record and 5.82 ERA with 54 strikeouts in 85 innings pitched. He elected free agency following the season on November 10.

=== Generales de Durango ===
On May 1, 2023, Nicolino signed with the Generales de Durango of the Mexican League. In 6 starts, he posted a 2–1 record with a 6.65 ERA and 18 strikeouts over 21 2/3 innings. Nicolino was released by Durango on June 8.

=== High Point Rockers (second stint) ===
On June 24, 2023, Nicolino signed with the High Point Rockers of the Atlantic League of Professional Baseball. In 9 starts for the Rockers, he logged a 4–1 record and 4.56 ERA with 34 strikeouts across 47 1/3 innings pitched.

In January 2024, Nicolino retired from professional baseball and became a performance coach at Tread Athletics.

== Scouting report ==
Nicolino is a contact pitcher, pitching in the high 80s to low 90s with his fastball. He also throws a changeup and a curveball. Since 2014, Nicolino has averaged 4.8 strikeouts per 9 innings in the minors, while with the Marlins since 2015, he's average 3.7 strikeouts per 9 innings.
