= Raudel Lazo =

American baseball player (born 1989)

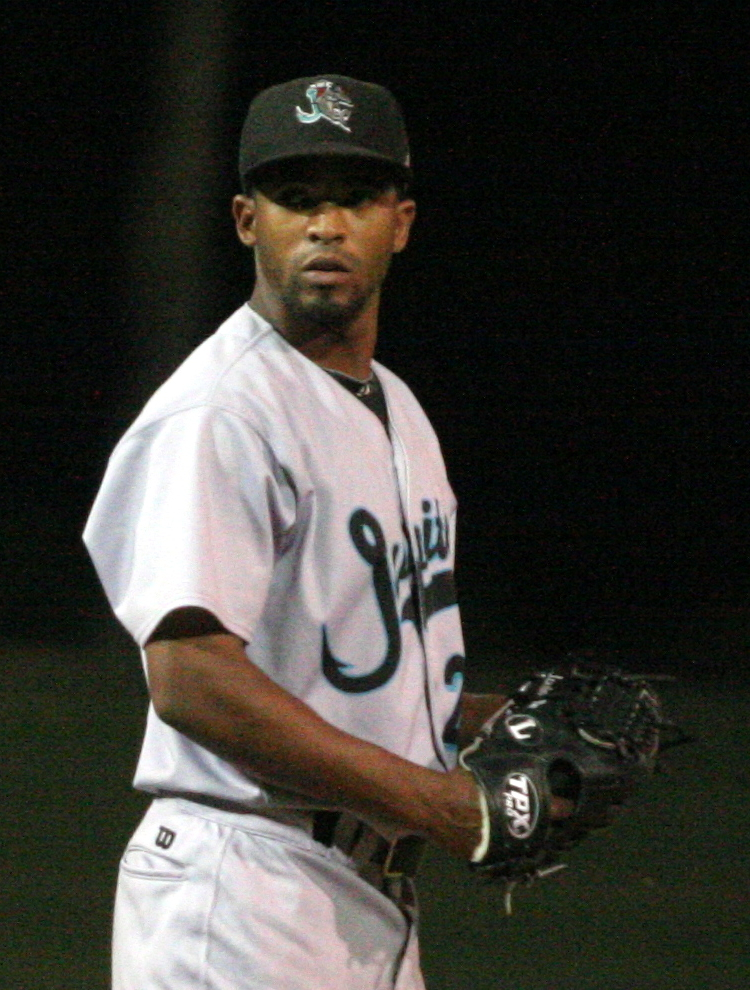
- Lazo pitching for the Jupiter Hammerheads, advanced-A affiliates of the Marlins, in 2012
- Pitcher
- Born: April 12, 1989 (age 37); Pinar del Rio, Cuba
- Batted: Left Threw: Left

MLB debut
- September 5, 2015, for the Miami Marlins

Last MLB appearance
- October 3, 2015, for the Miami Marlins

MLB statistics
- Win–loss record: 0–0
- Earned run average: 3.18
- Strikeouts: 5
- Stats at Baseball Reference

Teams
- Miami Marlins (2015)

Raudel Lazo Blanco (born April 12, 1989) is a Cuban former professional baseball pitcher. He played in Major League Baseball (MLB) for the Miami Marlins.

== Career ==
=== Miami Marlins ===
Lazo played in the Cuban National Series for the Vegueros de Pinar del Rio in 2008 and 2009. In 2011, he defected from Cuba to the United States to pursue an MLB career. He signed with the Miami Marlins.

Lazo was called up to the majors for the first time on September 2, 2015. He was released on May 16, 2017.

=== Baltimore Orioles ===
On June 26, 2017, Lazo signed a minor league deal with the Baltimore Orioles. He made 8 appearances for the Double–A Bowie Baysox, registering a 4.35 ERA with 9 strikeouts in 10 1/3 innings pitched. He elected free agency following the season on November 6.

=== Saraperos de Saltillo ===
On March 6, 2019, Lazo signed with the Saraperos de Saltillo of the Mexican League. He was released on April 25, 2019. In 9 games 6.2 innings of relief he struggled mightily going 0-0 with a 12.15 ERA with 6 strikeouts.

=== Sioux City Explorers ===
On December 9, 2019, Lazo signed with the Sioux City Explorers of the independent American Association. However, the team was not selected by the league to compete in the condensed 2020 season due to the COVID-19 pandemic. Lazo was not chosen by another team in the dispersal draft, and therefore became a free agent.

== Personal life ==
His cousin, Pedro Luis Lazo, was also a pitcher in the Cuban National Series and is the all-time leader in pitching wins for the league.

== See also ==
- List of baseball players who defected from Cuba
