= Dan Jennings (baseball manager) =

American baseball executive and manager

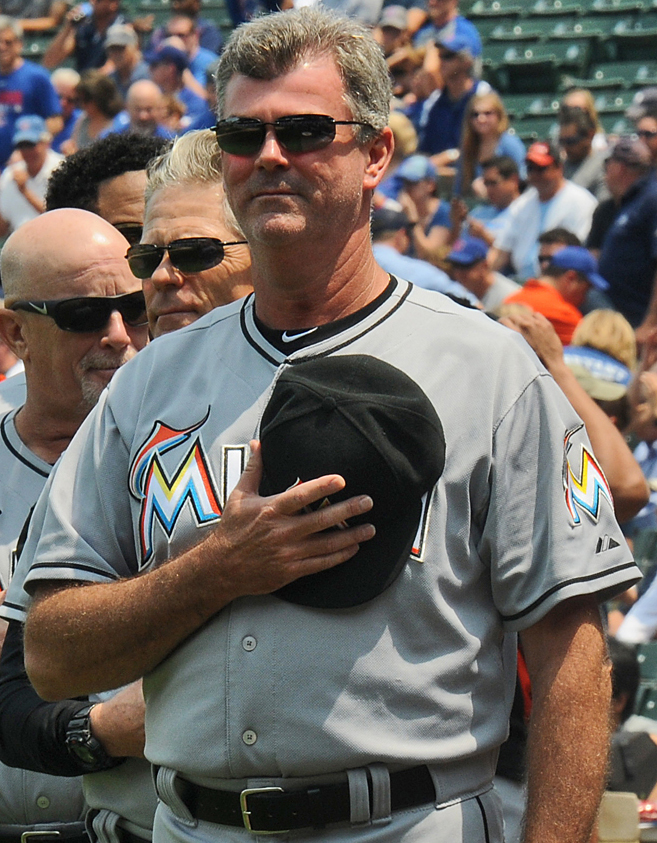
- Jennings with the Miami Marlins in 2015

Washington Nationals
- Manager / Assistant to GM
- Born: September 16, 1960 (age 65); Daphne, Alabama, U.S.
- Bats: Right Throws: Right

MLB statistics (through 2015 season)
- Games managed: 124
- Win–loss record: 55–69
- Winning %: .444
- Managerial record at Baseball Reference

Teams
- Miami Marlins (2015)

Daniel Ray Jennings (born September 16, 1960) is an American professional baseball manager and executive. He is the former manager and general manager of the Miami Marlins of Major League Baseball (MLB). He served as a scout in MLB beginning in 1986 and was the manager of the Marlins from May until the end of the 2015 season. He works in scouting for the Washington Nationals.

== Early life and amateur career ==
Jennings attended Satsuma, Davidson, and Fairhope High Schools in Alabama while his father, Don, moved between baseball coaching jobs. Don eventually settled in as the longtime coach at Coastal Alabama Community College. Jennings graduated from Fairhope in 1978.

Jennings attended the University of Southern Mississippi, where he played college baseball for the Southern Mississippi Golden Eagles. He transferred to William Carey University and played baseball there as well, graduating in 1984.

== Playing career ==
Undrafted out of college, Jennings tried out for the New York Yankees in 1984, who signed him. He appeared in spring training for the Greensboro Hornets, the Yankees' Class A affiliate.

== Coaching and executive career ==
Jennings coached the baseball team at Davidson High School in Mobile, Alabama from 1985 until 1988. Jennings simultaneously served as an associate scout for the Cincinnati Reds beginning in 1986. He was named an area scout for the Seattle Mariners in 1988. The Mariners promoted him to crosschecker in 1995, and he accepted a job with the Tampa Bay Devil Rays as their scouting director later that year.

Jennings joined the Marlins as Vice President of Player Personnel in 2002. He was named the Marlins' assistant general manager in September 2007. At the end of the 2013 season, the Marlins promoted Michael Hill to president and Jennings to general manager. At one point, there was a pitcher for the Marlins also named Dan Jennings, but the two are not related.

Jennings was appointed Marlins' interim manager on May 17, 2015, following the firing of Mike Redmond, with assistant GM Mike Berger taking over as general manager. The move was widely considered unorthodox in that Jennings had no coaching experience above the high school level decades earlier and had no professional playing experience. It was described in Business Insider as "shocking," in Sports Illustrated as "weird," on Grantland as "utterly baffling" and in USA Today as "bizarre" and optically "problematic" for the troubled Marlins front office. On October 29, the Marlins fired Jennings and hired Don Mattingly as manager. Only three weeks earlier, the team had said that Jennings would return to his general manager role, for which he was under contract until 2018.

On January 8, 2016, Jennings was hired by the Washington Nationals to serve as an assistant to Mike Rizzo, the GM of the Nationals. It was reported that Jennings would assist with scouting. The Marlins filed and lost a grievance against the Nationals that March. They unsuccessfully argued that the $100,000 salary the Nationals were paying Jennings was too low for his responsibilities and not enough to offset the $1.5 million the Marlins still owed him.

== Managerial record ==
Team	From	To	Regular season record			Post–season record		
Team	From	To	W	L	Win %	W	L	Win %
Miami Marlins	2015	2015	55	69	.444	—		
Total			55	69	.444	0	0	–
