= Jeff Mathis =

American baseball player (born 1983)

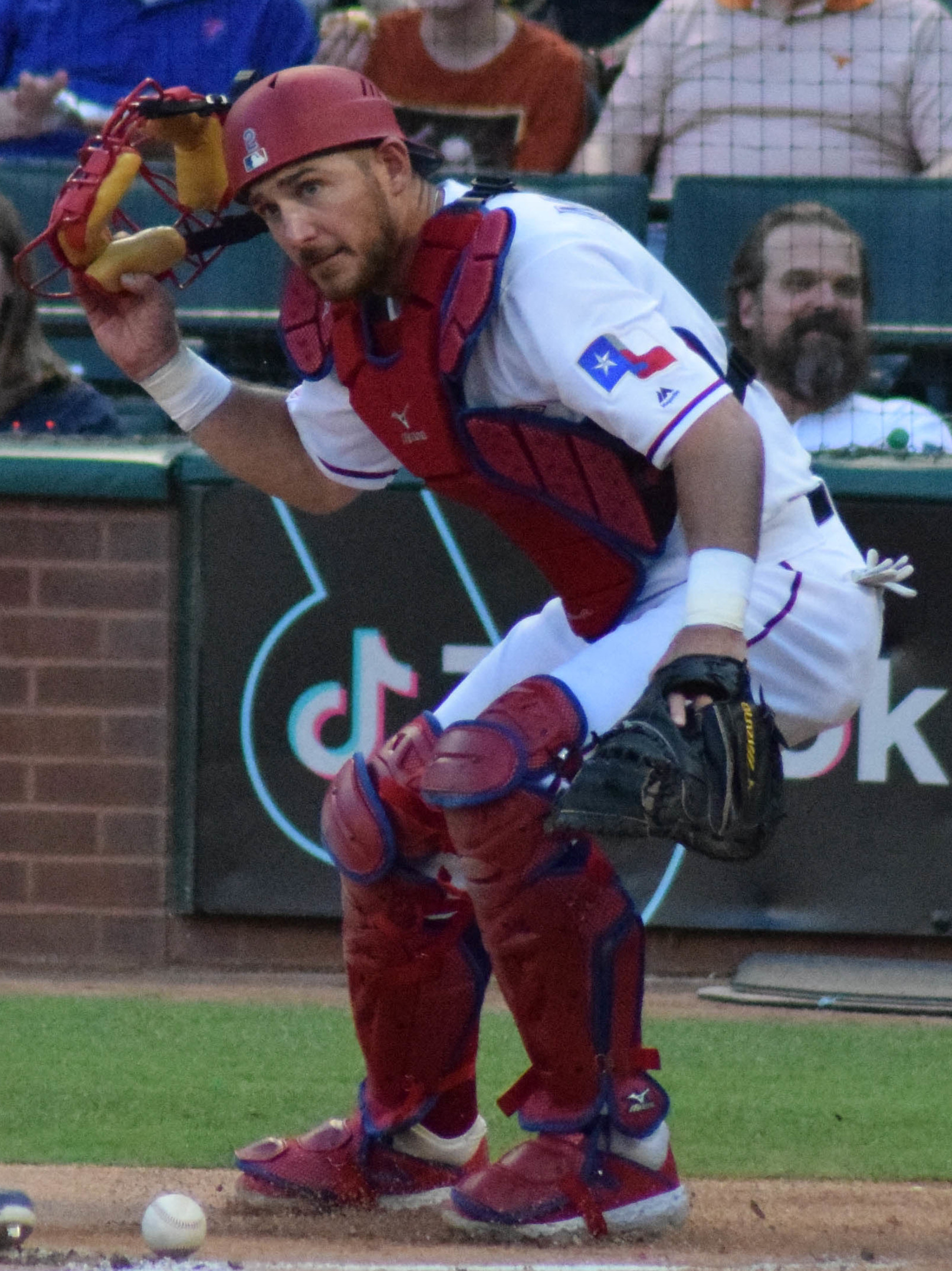
- Mathis with the Texas Rangers in 2019
- Catcher
- Born: March 31, 1983 (age 43); Marianna, Florida, U.S.
- Batted: Right Threw: Right

MLB debut
- August 12, 2005, for the Los Angeles Angels of Anaheim

Last MLB appearance
- May 17, 2021, for the Atlanta Braves

MLB statistics
- Batting average: .194
- Home runs: 53
- Runs batted in: 286
- Stats at Baseball Reference

Teams
- Los Angeles Angels of Anaheim (2005–2011); Toronto Blue Jays (2012); Miami Marlins (2013–2016); Arizona Diamondbacks (2017–2018); Texas Rangers (2019–2020); Atlanta Braves (2021)

Jeffrey Stephen Mathis (born March 31, 1983) is an American former professional baseball catcher. He played in Major League Baseball (MLB) for the Los Angeles Angels of Anaheim, Toronto Blue Jays, Miami Marlins, Arizona Diamondbacks, Texas Rangers, and Atlanta Braves.

== Early life and education ==
Mathis was born and raised in Marianna, Florida, the son of Danny and Bunnee Mathis. He has one brother, Jake Mathis, who played in the minor leagues from 2002-2003 for the Angels.

At Marianna High School, Mathis played both football and baseball, winning four district titles and a regional title. He also appeared in the 1999 state title game in baseball, along with the state championship game in football in 2000.

After his playing career concluded, the Jackson County School Board renamed the road leading up to Marianna High School's baseball field in Mathis's honor.

== Professional career ==
=== Los Angeles Angels of Anaheim ===
Mathis was drafted in the first round by the Los Angeles Angels of Anaheim out of high school in 2001, which he accepted in lieu of attending Florida State University. He quickly moved up the ranks, and by 2005, he was with the Salt Lake Bees at the Triple-A level. In 2005, he had a .276 batting average with 21 home runs across 111 games. Noted for his defensive skills, he also earned the Angels' minor league Defensive Player of the Year award.

Following the 2005 season, the Angels declined to pursue the return of their free agent starting catcher, Bengie Molina, allowing Mathis to take Molina's spot.

==== Major leagues ====
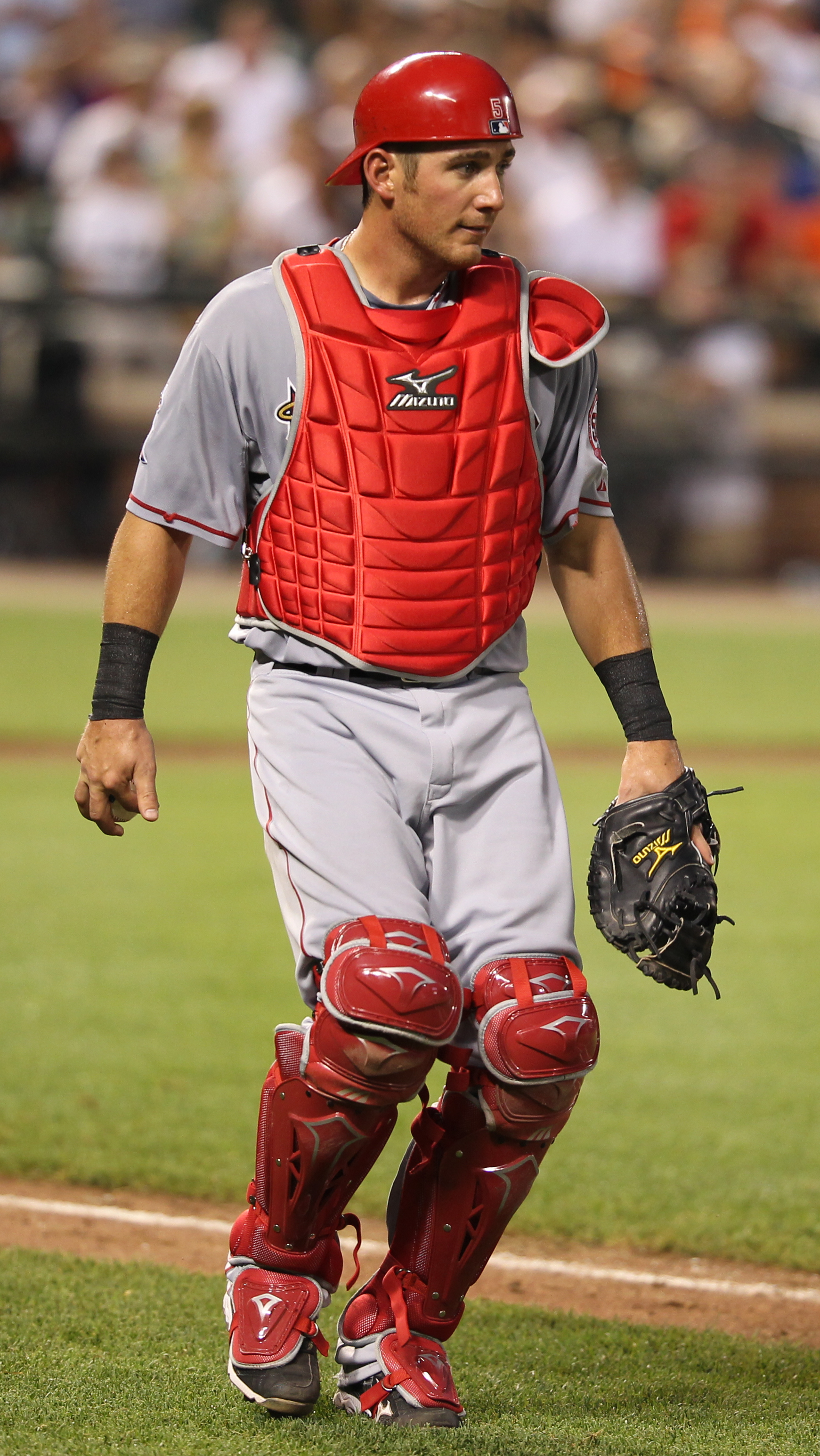
Mathis playing for the Los Angeles Angels of Anaheim in 2011

After a solid 2006 spring training, Mathis was expected to see substantial playing time at catcher, sharing the position with José Molina. However, once the regular season began, he struggled greatly on both defense and offense. The Angels demoted him back to the minor leagues about one month into the season. Mathis was replaced on the Angels roster by catcher Mike Napoli, who later became a very offensive-minded catcher that transitioned to being a first baseman and designated hitter for his offensive prowess. He was later recalled back to the majors on September 1. Overall in 2006 he played 23 games, having a .145 batting average and collecting 8 hits with 2 doubles and 2 home runs.

Mathis entered the 2007 season fighting for the two catcher positions with Mike Napoli and José Molina. He would end up being sent back to the minors with the Salt Lake Bees. In the beginning of July, Napoli sustained a high ankle sprain, making the Angels recall Mathis to the majors. He made his first season start on July 4 against the Texas Rangers. He went 0 for 2, ground and flying out in a 2–4 loss. On July 21, Molina was traded to the New York Yankees, making Napoli and Mathis hold the two catcher positions for the rest of the season. The trade also indicated the Angels’ confidence in Mathis. Overall in 2007, Mathis played in 59 games, accumulating 36 hits, with 12 doubles and 4 home runs while accruing a .211 batting average.

On July 23, 2008, Mathis had 4 hits and 6 RBI (the highest in a single game for both categories that season) in a 14-11 win against the Cleveland Indians. Mathis noted that his team's pitcher, John Lackey, "obviously didn't have his best stuff today, but he kept battling through it... and luckily we were able to put some runs on the board for him." Overall in 2008, Mathis played in 94 games, the most in a single season. However, he had a batting average of .194, below the Mendoza Line.

In game 3 of the 2009 American League Championship Series, Mathis hit an 11th-inning walk-off RBI double, defeating the New York Yankees 5–4. In spite of his poor regular season stats (.211 batting average), he used his strong playoff offensive performance and excellent defensive skill to bolster his case for a raise to $1.3 million, beating the Angels management in arbitration. The arbitration hearing was also something of a watershed in the amount of consideration paid to Mathis' defensive statistics. The LA Times highlighted the stark comparisons with competing catcher Mike Napoli: "in 657 innings with the agile Mathis behind the plate, Angels pitchers had a 3.99 earned-run average; they had a 4.86 ERA in 758 innings with Napoli catching. Mathis also caught 17 of 69 attempted base-stealers for a 24.6% success rate; Napoli, who will make $3.6 million in 2010 but is coming off two 20-homer seasons, caught 13 of 87 attempted base-stealers for a 14.9% success rate". Mathis had been among the AL leaders in pitchers' earned run averages while behind the plate.

In 2010, Mathis was ranked by Beyond the Box Score as one of the worst defensive catchers in baseball. He also matched his career-worst batting average of .194, while posting a sub-.500 OPS in over 200 at bats.

=== Toronto Blue Jays ===
On December 3, 2011, following the acquisition of Chris Iannetta, he was traded to the Toronto Blue Jays for pitcher Brad Mills.

Nine days later, Mathis signed a contract with the Blue Jays to avoid arbitration. He signed a one-year deal and was guaranteed to earn $1.5 million. Mathis made his first career pitching appearance in a game against the Texas Rangers on May 25. Pitching in the 8th inning, Mathis gave up a hit and walked a batter, but ended the inning without surrendering a run. He became the sixth position player for the Blue Jays to pitch in a game, and the first since Mike McCoy on June 11, 2011. He made a second pitching appearance exactly two months later, mopping up in a 16–0 loss against Oakland. In that game, Mathis gave up 3 hits and 2 runs (both earned) in 1 inning of work.

On August 14, 2012, Mathis was signed to a two-year contract extension worth $3 million. It included a 2015 club option worth $1.5 million. Mathis was hitting .215 with six home runs over 147 plate appearances at the time of extension.

=== Miami Marlins ===
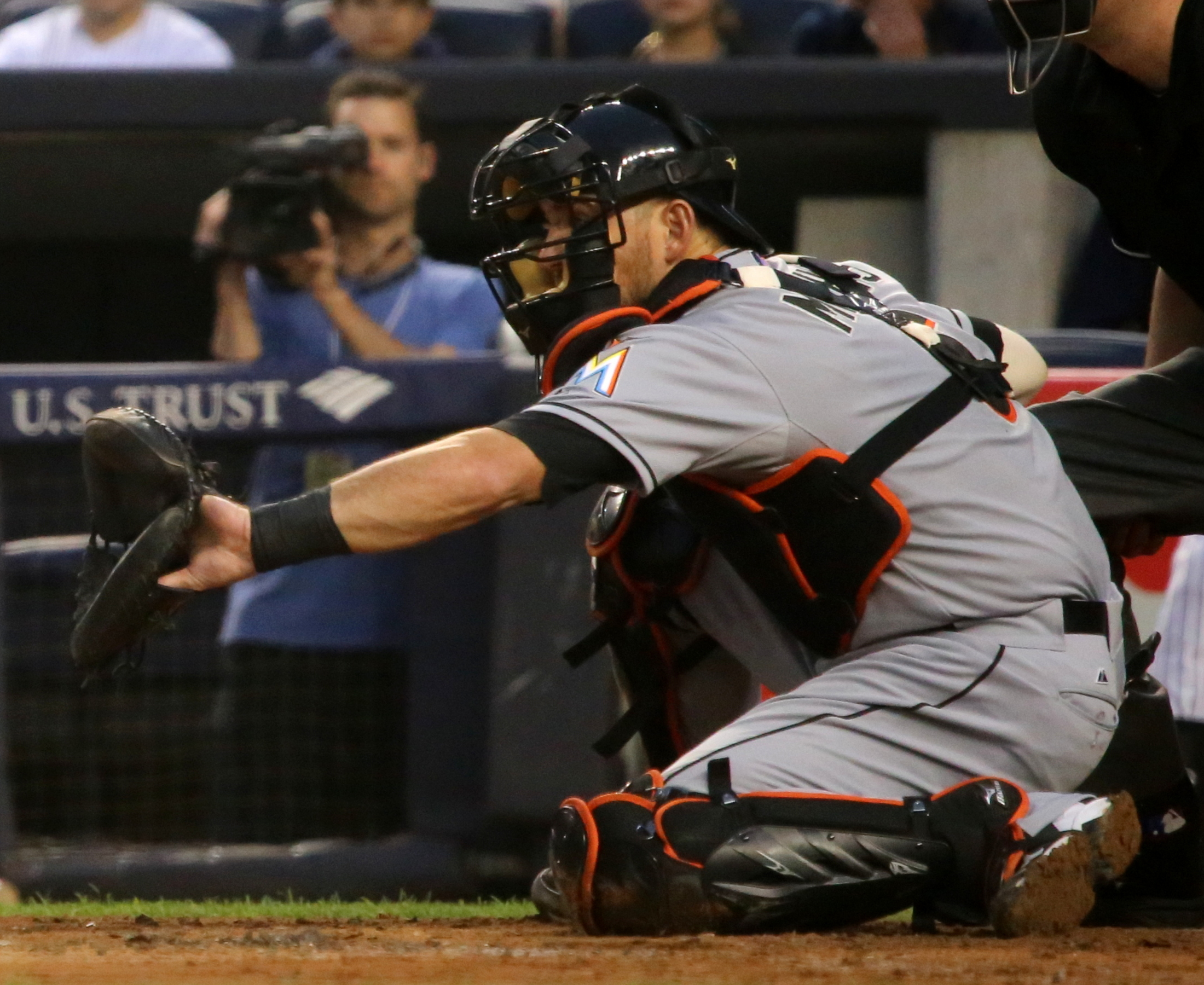
Mathis with the Miami Marlins in 2015.

On November 19, 2012, Mathis was traded to the Miami Marlins along with Adeiny Hechavarria, Henderson Álvarez, Yunel Escobar, Jake Marisnick, Anthony DeSclafani, and Justin Nicolino, in exchange for Mark Buehrle, Josh Johnson, José Reyes, John Buck, and Emilio Bonifacio. Mathis was expected to serve as the back-up to Rob Brantly.

In his first spring training game with the Marlins on February 23, 2013, Mathis broke his collarbone on a foul tip hit by Matt Holliday. He was the only catcher with major-league experience besides Brantly, and was expected to miss 6 weeks. Mathis made his season debut on May 16, going 0–4 with 2 strikeouts. On June 30, he hit a walk-off grand slam against Tyson Ross of the San Diego Padres to give Miami the win, 6–2. On November 1, 2014, the Marlins exercised their $1.5 million 2015 option on Mathis.

On December 18, 2015, Mathis re-signed with the Marlins on a 1-year deal worth $1.5 million. He hit his third career grand slam (first since 2013) in a June 14, 2016 game against the San Diego Padres.

=== Arizona Diamondbacks ===
Mathis signed a two-year, $4 million deal with the Arizona Diamondbacks on December 5, 2016. During the 2017 season, he appeared in 60 games with the Diamondbacks, batting .215 with two home runs and 11 RBIs. He hit .200 with 1 home run and 20 RBI in 2018.

=== Texas Rangers ===
On November 15, 2018, Mathis signed a two-year deal, with the Texas Rangers. In 2019, Mathis hit .158/.209/.224/.433 with 2 home runs and 12 RBI over 86 games. On defense, he helped Lance Lynn and Mike Minor finish in the top 10 in AL Cy Young Award voting. In 24 games in 2020 for Texas, Mathis slashed .161/.221/.355 with 3 home runs and 9 RBI over 62 at-bats.

=== Philadelphia Phillies ===
On February 16, 2021, Mathis signed a minor league contract with the Philadelphia Phillies organization that included an invitation to spring training. On March 24, 2021, Mathis was released from his contract with the Phillies after ten spring training games.

=== Atlanta Braves ===
On March 30, 2021, Mathis signed a minor league contract with the Atlanta Braves organization. On May 2, Mathis was selected to the active roster after starter Travis d'Arnaud and backup Alex Jackson were placed on the injured list. After going hitless in 9 at-bats, Mathis was designated for assignment on May 19 following the acquisition of Kevan Smith. He was removed from the 40-man roster and sent outright to the Triple-A Gwinnett Stripers the next day. Mathis received his only World Series ring, as the Braves went on to win the World Series. He elected free agency following the season on November 7.

== Player profile ==
After leaving the Angels, Mathis became a heavily defensive catcher who excelled in pitch framing and catching base stealers. Because of these skills, he was a preferred catcher to pitchers such as Jose Fernandez and Zack Greinke, despite being among the league worst in many batting statistics.

== Personal life ==
Mathis and his wife Jenna have two daughters.
