= Kendry Flores =

Dominican baseball player (born 1991)

- Pitcher
- Born: November 24, 1991 (age 34); Azua, Azua, Dominican Republic
- Batted: Right Threw: Right

MLB debut
- June 6, 2015, for the Miami Marlins

Last MLB appearance
- May 14, 2016, for the Miami Marlins

MLB statistics
- Win–loss record: 1–2
- Earned run average: 4.02
- Strikeouts: 10
- Stats at Baseball Reference

Teams
- Miami Marlins (2015–2016)

Kendry Flores (born November 24, 1991) is a Dominican former professional baseball pitcher. He has previously played in Major League Baseball (MLB) for the Miami Marlins.

== Career ==
=== San Francisco Giants ===
Flores was originally signed by the San Francisco Giants as an international free agent on June 9, 2009. He made his professional debut with the Dominican Summer League Giants, logging a 7–2 record and 2.18 ERA in 13 starts. Flores made 13 appearances (11 starts) for the rookie–level Arizona League Giants, recording a 5.06 ERA with 47 strikeouts across 46 innings of work.

Flores spent the 2011 and 2012 campaigns with the Low–A Salem-Keizer Volcanoes. In 22 games (19 starts) across the two seasons, he accumulated a 5–6 record and 4.78 ERA with 81 strikeouts across 90 1/3 innings pitched.

In 2013, Flores made 22 starts for the Single–A Augusta GreenJackets, compiling a 10–6 record and 2.73 ERA with 137 strikeouts across 141 1/3 innings pitched. On November 20, 2013, the Giants added Flores to their 40-man roster to protect him from the Rule 5 draft.

Flores spent the entirety of the 2014 season with the High–A San Jose Giants. In 20 starts, he posted a 4–6 record and 4.09 ERA with 112 strikeouts across 105 2/3 innings pitched.

=== Miami Marlins ===
On December 19, 2014, Flores and Luis Castillo were traded to the Miami Marlins in exchange for Casey McGehee. He began the 2015 season with the High–A Jupiter Hammerheads, being promoted to the Double–A Jacksonville Suns after two scoreless starts. On June 2, 2015, Flores was promoted to the major leagues for the first time. In 7 games for Miami during his rookie campaign, he compiled a 4.97 ERA with 9 strikeouts across 12 2/3 innings. On August 24, Flores was scratched from a scheduled start against the Pittsburgh Pirates with right shoulder tendinitis. The next day, he was placed on the disabled list, and missed the remainder of the season.

Flores was optioned to the Triple–A New Orleans Zephyrs to begin the 2016 season. On May 14, 2016, Flores was recalled to make a spot start against the Washington Nationals, logging three scoreless innings before departing due to injury. He was placed on the disabled list with a strained pitching shoulder the same day as a result. On September 6, Flores was designated for assignment by the Marlins. He cleared waivers and was sent outright to New Orleans on September 8. Flores elected free agency following the season on November 7.

=== St. Louis Cardinals ===
On November 18, 2016, Flores signed a minor league deal with the St. Louis Cardinals that included an invitation to spring training. On February 16, 2017, the contract was voided after Flores failed his physical.

=== BSC Grosseto 1952 ===
On March 25, 2022, Flores signed with BSC Grosseto 1952 of the Italian Baseball League. In 13 starts for the club, Flores posted a 5–4 record and 3.23 ERA with 93 strikeouts across 61 1/3 innings pitched. He became a free agent after the season.
