= Adeiny Hechavarría =

Cuban baseball player (born 1989)

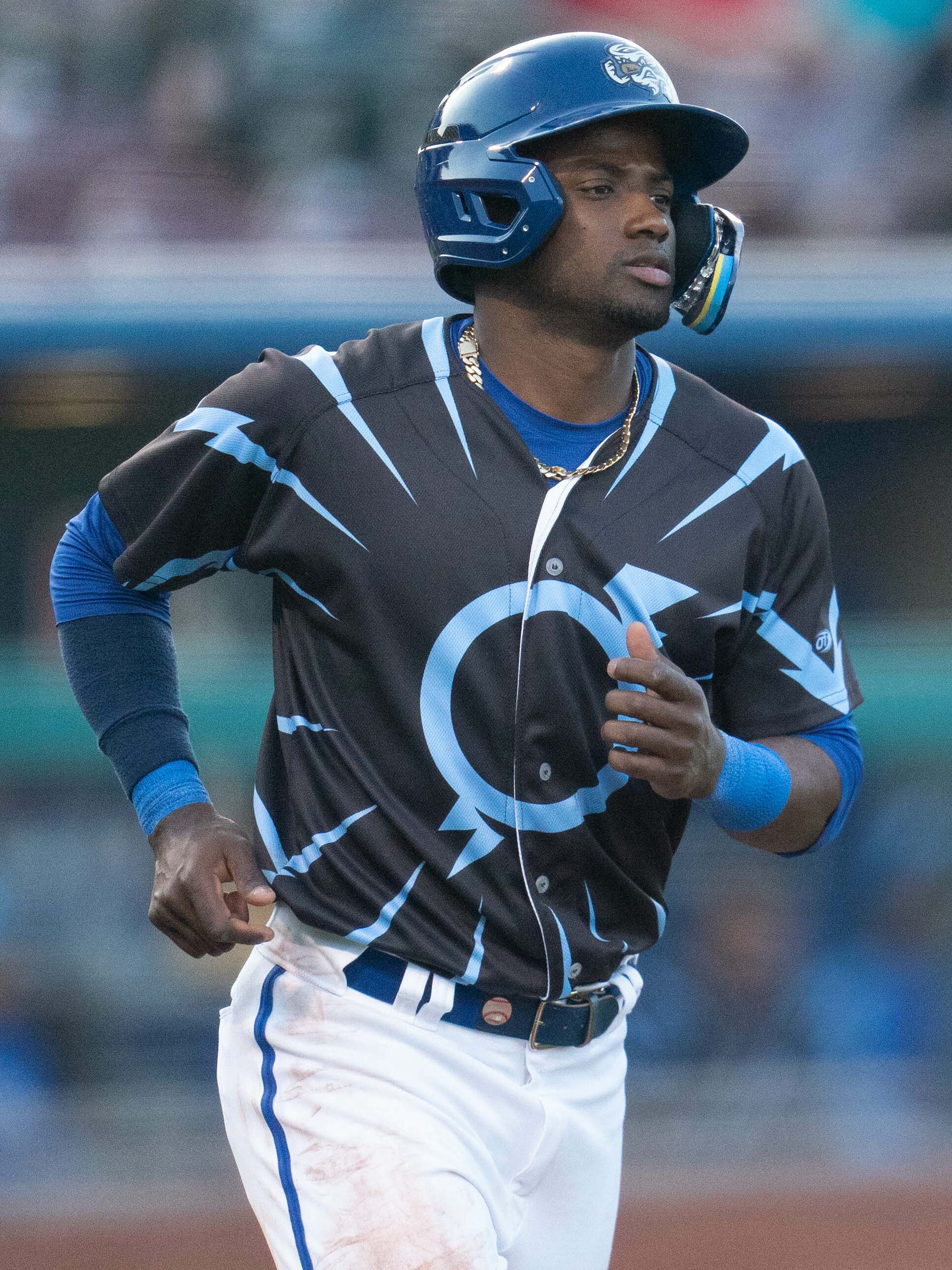
- Hechavarría with the Omaha Storm Chasers in 2023
- Shortstop
- Born: April 15, 1989 (age 37); Santiago de Cuba, Cuba
- Batted: Right Threw: Right

Professional debut
- MLB: August 4, 2012, for the Toronto Blue Jays
- NPB: April 30, 2021, for the Chiba Lotte Marines

Last appearance
- MLB: September 27, 2020, for the Atlanta Braves
- NPB: September 12, 2022, for the Chiba Lotte Marines

MLB statistics
- Batting average: .253
- Home runs: 37
- Runs batted in: 273

NPB statistics
- Batting average: .213
- Home runs: 6
- Runs batted in: 44
- Stats at Baseball Reference

Teams
- Toronto Blue Jays (2012); Miami Marlins (2013–2017); Tampa Bay Rays (2017–2018); Pittsburgh Pirates (2018); New York Yankees (2018); New York Mets (2019); Atlanta Braves (2019–2020); Chiba Lotte Marines (2021–2022)

Adeiny Hechavarría Barrera (born April 15, 1989) is a Cuban former professional baseball shortstop. He played in Major League Baseball (MLB) for the Toronto Blue Jays, Miami Marlins, Tampa Bay Rays, Pittsburgh Pirates, New York Yankees, New York Mets, and Atlanta Braves from 2012 to 2020. After his MLB career, he played for the Chiba Lotte Marines in Nippon Professional Baseball (NPB) and for the Olmecas de Tabasco of the Mexican League.

== Early life ==
Hechavarría was born in Santiago de Cuba in Cuba to Diosmede and Mirta Hechavarría. He has an older brother, Alien.

Hechavarría participated in a Pan American tournament in Mexico in 2006, and played shortstop for the Cuban Junior National team in 2008. In 2009, he defected to Mexico on a boat with 11 others. Agents and other representatives of the Toronto Blue Jays watched him play in workouts in the Dominican Republic and signed him after his visa paperwork went through in 2010.

== Professional career ==
=== Toronto Blue Jays ===
On April 13, 2010, Hechavarría signed a four-year, $10 million contract with the Toronto Blue Jays. He was assigned to extended spring training and first appeared in a game with the Dunedin Blue Jays of the High-A Florida State League. On June 30, Hechavarría was promoted to the Double-A New Hampshire Fisher Cats of the Eastern League, where he recorded a .273 batting average and .303 on-base percentage.

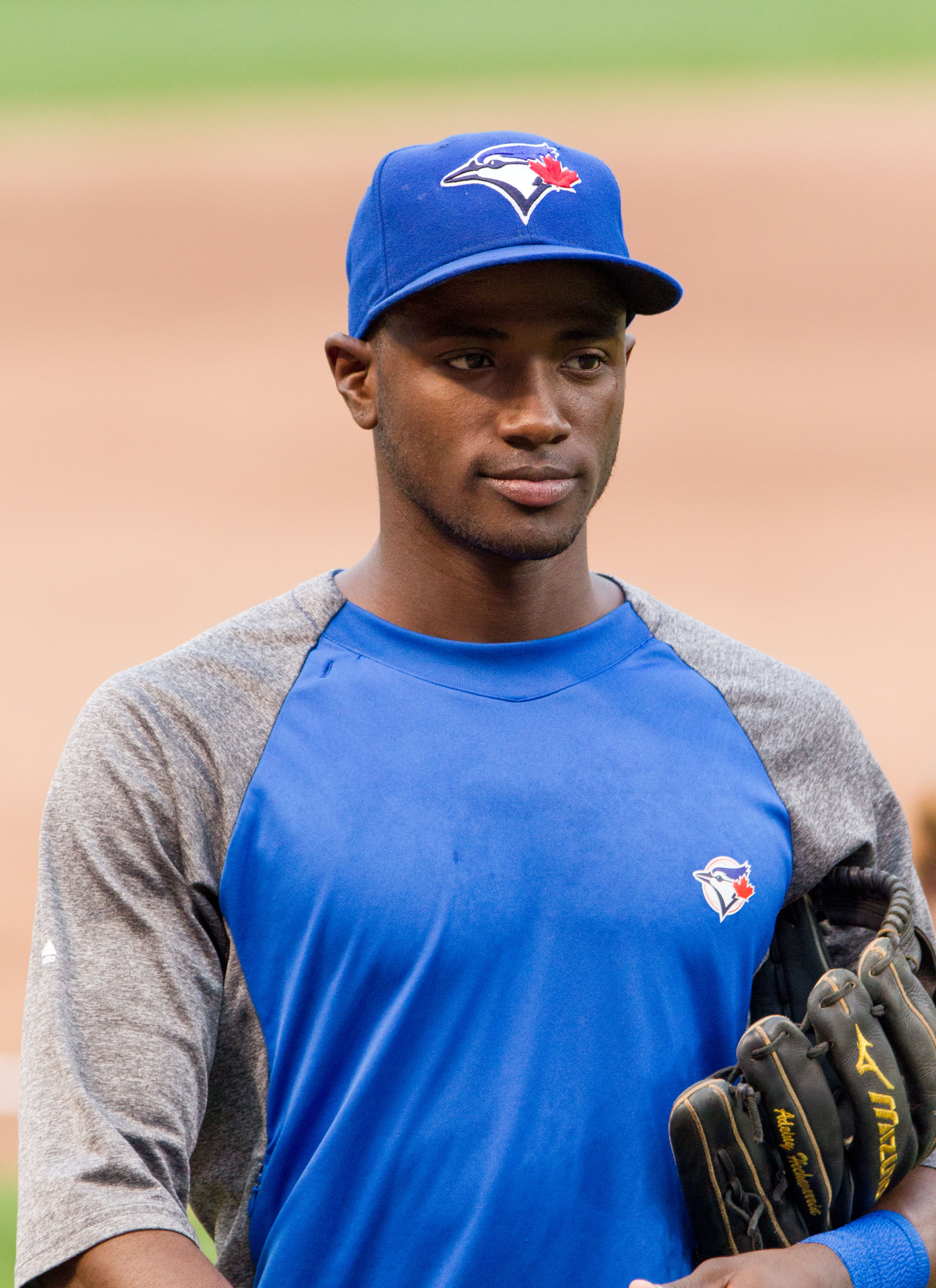
Hechavarría with the Toronto Blue Jays in 2012

Hechavarría started the 2012 season with the Triple-A Las Vegas 51s of the Pacific Coast League (PCL). He appeared in the Triple-A All-Star Game and had a .312 batting average and had scored 78 runs in 102 games in the minors.

On August 4, 2012, Hechavarría was called up to the Toronto Blue Jays active roster for the first time. He played third base in his debut due to Brett Lawrie's oblique strain and batted 0-for-3 with two strikeouts and one walk. Hechavarría recorded his first career hit on August 7, against the Tampa Bay Rays. He was returned to Las Vegas on August 25, when Yunel Escobar returned to the Jays from paternity leave. The next day, Hechavarría was recalled when José Bautista and David Cooper were added to the disabled list. Hechavarría hit his first career home run, a solo shot off starter Phil Hughes, against the New York Yankees on August 28.

=== Miami Marlins ===
On November 19, 2012, Hechavarría was traded to the Miami Marlins along with Henderson Álvarez, Jeff Mathis, Yunel Escobar, Jake Marisnick, Anthony DeSclafani, and Justin Nicolino, in exchange for Mark Buehrle, Josh Johnson, José Reyes, John Buck, and Emilio Bonifacio. On January 29, 2013, Hechavarría was named number 82 on MLB's Top Prospects list.

Hechavarría was the Marlins' starting shortstop for the first 14 games of the 2013 season until he was placed on the 15-day disabled list with a sore throwing arm. He was activated from the disabled list on May 2. On May 5, Hechavarría hit a bases-loaded triple and a grand slam against Roy Halladay of the Philadelphia Phillies. On June 8, he hit an RBI single off Shaun Marcum to score Plácido Polanco in what would be the game winner, as the Marlins beat the Mets in 20 innings. Overall, Hechavarría appeared in 148 games in 2013 season, batting .227./.267/.298, with 3 home runs and 42 runs batted in. He also recorded 8 triples and went 11-for-21 in stolen base attempts.

Hechavarría played in 146 games during the 2014 season. His average climbed to .276. He had one home run, 34 runs batted in, and 10 triples. In 2015, Hechavarría made 130 appearances for the Marlins. He batted .281, hit 5 homers, and drove in 48 runs. He was named the National League Player of the Week on April 26 after posting a .500 batting average and 10 RBI during the preceding week.

During the 2016 season, Hechavarría appeared in 155 games. His batting average fell to .236. He had three home runs and 38 runs batted in. His .311 slugging percentage was the lowest of all qualified major league batters. He also had the lowest Isolated Power of all MLB players in 2016, at .075.

On May 10, 2017, Hechavarría went on the disabled list with a strained oblique muscle. In mid-June, he played in 10 rehab games.

=== Tampa Bay Rays ===
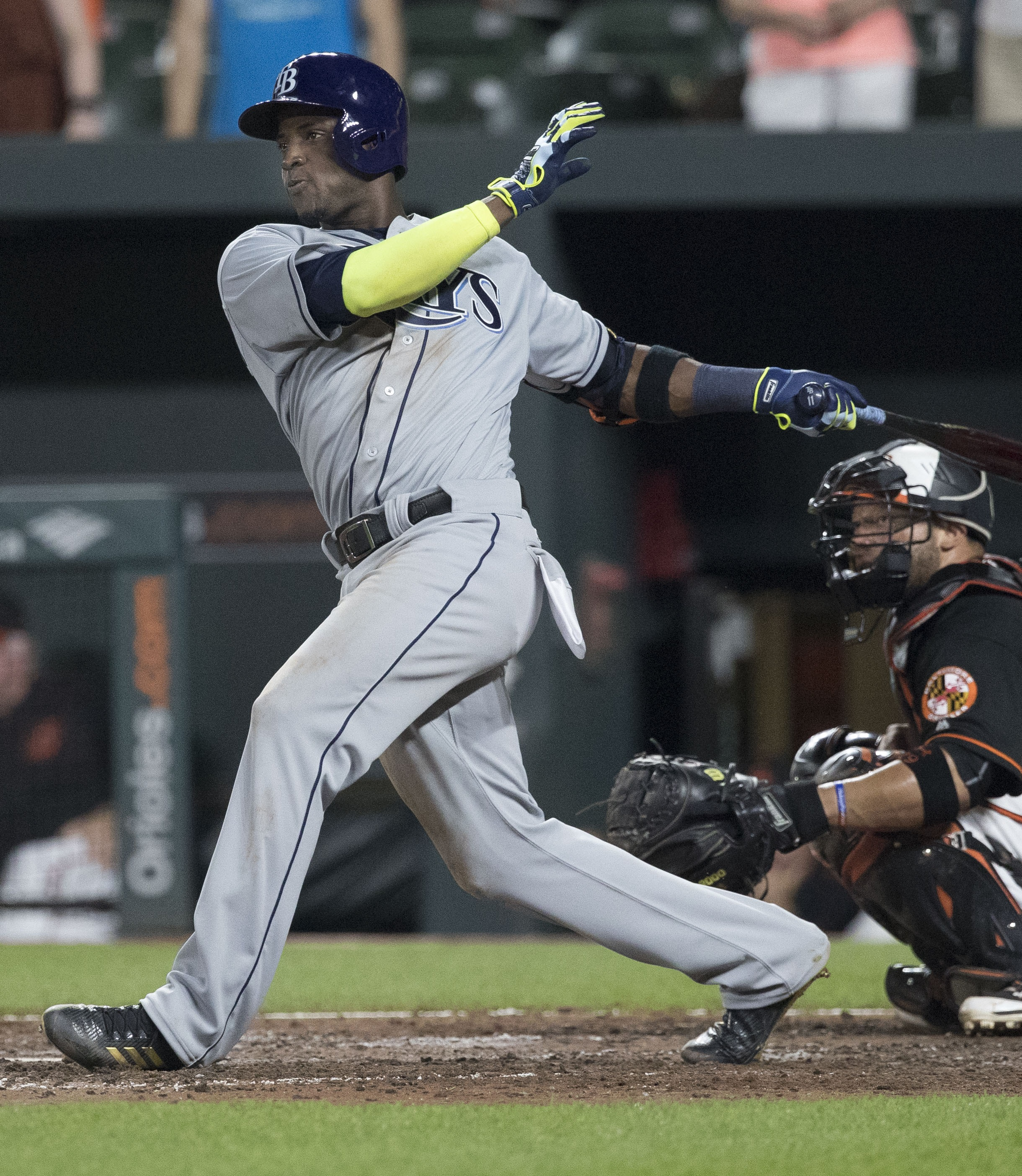
Hechavarría with the Rays in 2017

On June 26, 2017, the Marlins traded Hechavarría to the Tampa Bay Rays for minor leaguers Braxton Lee and Ethan Clark. Hechavarría finished the year with a .267 batting average and a career high 8 home runs.

On April 26, 2018, Hechavarría broke Chris Gomez's franchise record by recording 242 consecutive chances without an error. Hechavarría did not commit an error until the end of June. He suffered a hamstring injury and the team made prospect Willy Adames the starting shortstop. On August 1, Hechavarría was designated for assignment, opening a roster spot for the newly acquired Tommy Pham.

=== Pittsburgh Pirates ===
On August 6, 2018, the Rays traded Hechavarría and cash to the Pittsburgh Pirates for minor league pitcher Matt Seelinger. In 15 games for Pittsburgh, Hechavarría batted .233/.277/.395.

=== New York Yankees ===
On August 31, 2018, the Pirates traded Hechavarría to the New York Yankees for a player to be named later. On October 3, Hechavarría played in his first postseason game, the American League Wild Card Game. He entered the game in the sixth inning as a defensive replacement for third baseman Miguel Andújar. He batted 0-for-2 but made a highlight jumping catch. He came off the bench three times in the American League Division Series, batting 0-for-2 with a walk.

=== New York Mets ===
On February 18, 2019, Hechavarría signed a minor league contract with the New York Mets that included an invitation to spring training. On May 3, he triggered an opt-out clause in his deal, and the Mets selected his contract to their MLB roster. He was designated for assignment on August 9 to make room for newly signed second baseman Joe Panik. Hechavarría was released on August 14. With the Mets in 2019, he batted .204/.252/.359 with five home runs and 18 RBIs.

=== Atlanta Braves ===
On August 16, 2019, the Atlanta Braves signed Hechavarría to fill the Braves' shortstop vacancy with Dansby Swanson on the injured list. In 24 games with the Braves, he batted .328/.400/.639 in 61 at bats with four home runs and 15 RBIs. With both teams combined, in 2019 he batted .241/.299/.443 with nine home runs and 33 RBIs. In the National League Division Series, he was 0-for-3 as a pinch hitter, striking out twice.

On January 16, 2020, the Braves re-signed Hechavarría to a one-year, $1 million contract. In the strike-shortened season, he batted .254/.302/.305 with seven runs, no home runs, and two RBIs in 63 plate appearances, playing second base primarily, as well as third base and shortstop.

=== Chiba Lotte Marines ===
On December 25, 2020, Hechavarría signed with the Chiba Lotte Marines of Nippon Professional Baseball on a one-year, $970,000 contract. On April 30, 2021, he made his NPB debut. He played in 79 games for the team in 2021, slashing .203/.222/.314 with 4 home runs and 24 RBI. In 2022, he hit .222/.251/.300 with 2 home runs, 20 RBI, and four stolen bases.

On January 30, 2023, Hechavarría signed a minor league contract with the Atlanta Braves organization. He went 1-for-11 in spring training before he was released by the Braves on March 22.

=== Long Island Ducks ===
On April 11, 2023, Hechavarría signed with the Long Island Ducks of the Atlantic League of Professional Baseball. In 38 games for the Ducks, he hit .297/.382/.538 with 7 home runs and 34 RBI.

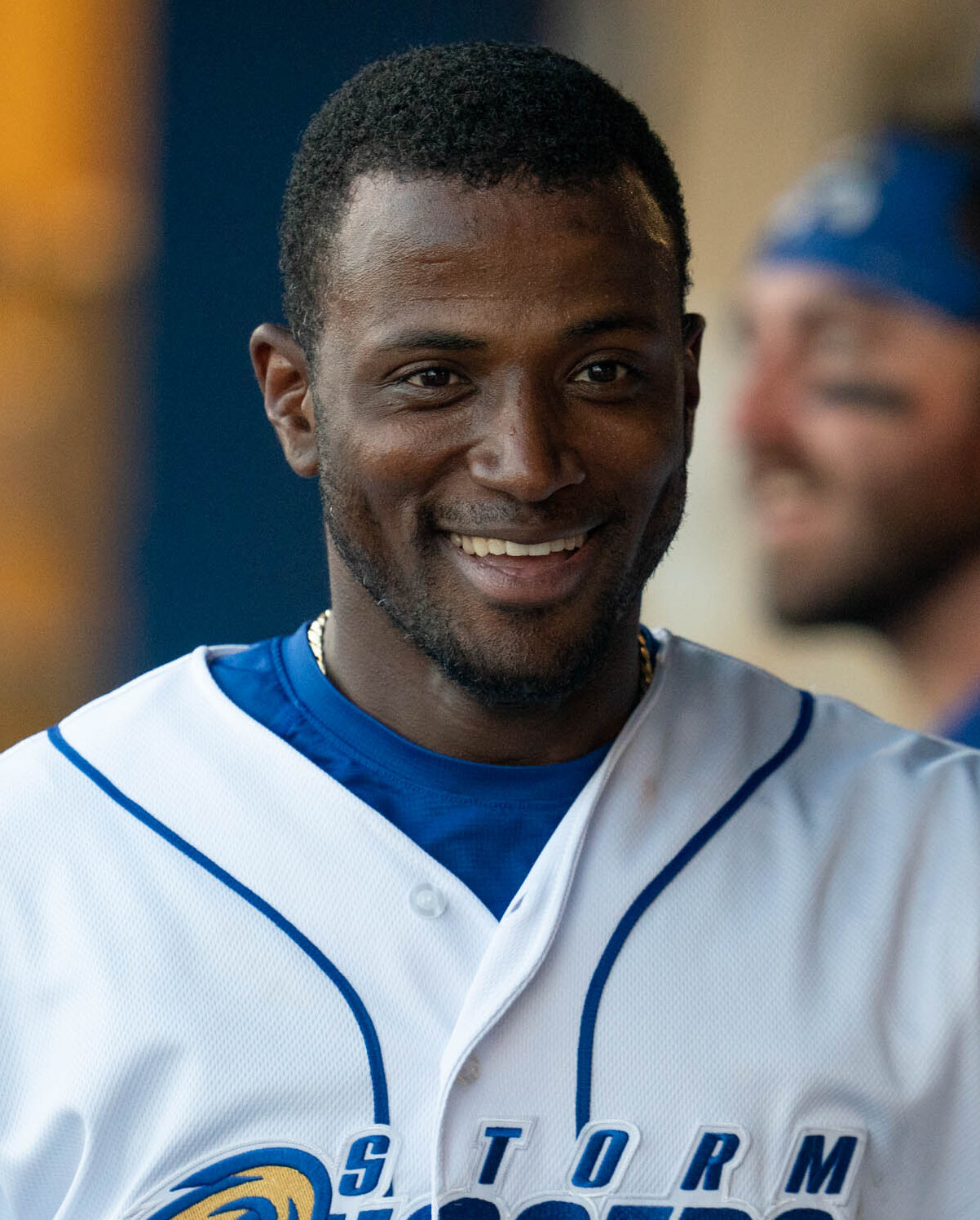
Hechavarría with the Omaha Storm Chasers in 2023.

=== Kansas City Royals ===
On June 16, 2023, Hechavarría's contract was purchased by the Kansas City Royals organization. In 36 games for the Triple-A Omaha Storm Chasers, he batted .221/.291/.425 with 6 home runs and 24 RBI. On August 14, Kansas City released Hechavarría.

=== Olmecas de Tabasco ===
On January 8, 2024, Hechavarría signed with the Olmecas de Tabasco of the Mexican League. In 70 games for Tabasco, he batted .249/.312/.414 with eight home runs and 25 RBI.

On December 11, 2024, Hechavarría was traded to the Leones de Yucatán of the Mexican League for Rubén Tejada. He was released by the Leones on March 31, 2025. On April 18, Hechavarría re-signed with Tabasco.

Hechavarría announced his retirement in September 2025, throwing out the first pitch at a Marlins game.

== See also ==
- List of baseball players who defected from Cuba
