= Tom Koehler =

American baseball pitcher (born 1986)

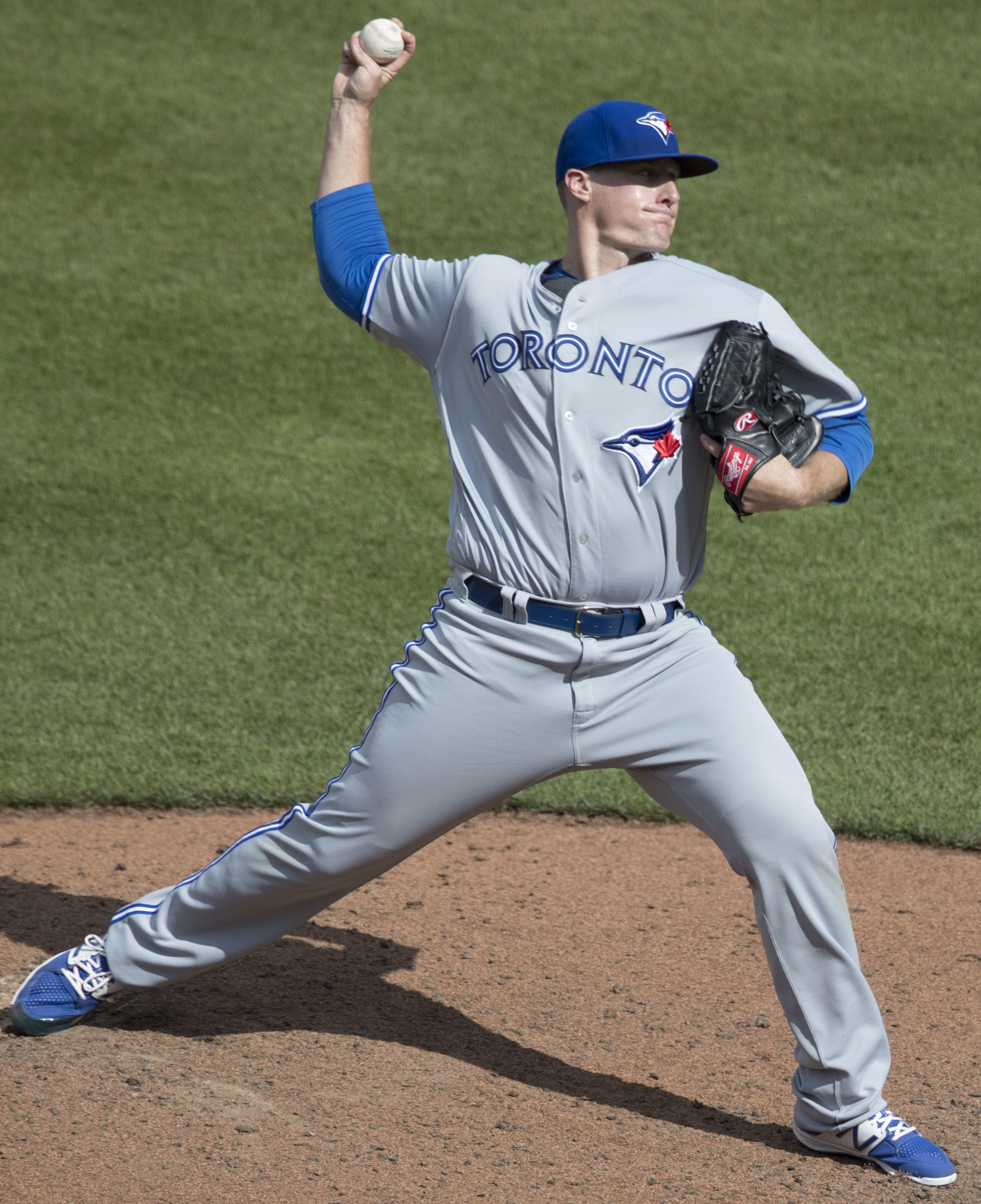
- Koehler with the Toronto Blue Jays in 2017
- Pitcher
- Born: June 29, 1986 (age 40); New York City, U.S.
- Batted: Right Threw: Right

MLB debut
- September 5, 2012, for the Miami Marlins

Last MLB appearance
- September 29, 2017, for the Toronto Blue Jays

MLB statistics
- Win–loss record: 36–55
- Earned run average: 4.39
- Strikeouts: 604
- Stats at Baseball Reference

Teams
- Miami Marlins (2012–2017); Toronto Blue Jays (2017)

Thomas Rolf Koehler (born June 29, 1986) is an American former professional baseball pitcher. Koehler played college baseball at Stony Brook University for the Stony Brook Seawolves and was drafted by the Florida Marlins in the 18th round of the 2008 MLB draft. He played six seasons in Major League Baseball (MLB) for the Miami Marlins and Toronto Blue Jays. After not appearing in a major league game since 2017, Koehler retired in 2020 due to numerous injuries, and became a MLBA certified baseball agent with Pro Agents Inc.

Koehler ranks top ten in numerous Marlins franchise pitching statistics, including games started, innings pitched, strikeouts, earned run average (ERA) and walks plus hits per inning pitched (WHIP). He currently remains the last Marlins pitcher to have ever started 30 games in three consecutive seasons for the team.

== Amateur career ==
Koehler attended New Rochelle High School in New Rochelle, New York, where he played on the school's baseball team. During the 2002 season, he was awarded the rookie of the year award. In his junior season, Koehler compiled a 5–1 record with 54 strikeouts. That year, he was an all-league selection. During his senior season, Koehler went 6–1 with a 0.83 earned run average (ERA) and 108 strikeouts in 59 innings pitched. After the season, he was a Rawlings All-Northeast, all-section, and all-state selection. He was also the Section I Pitcher of the Year, and the spring athlete of the year at his high school. Koehler was a three-time letter winner at New Rochelle.

In 2005, Koehler began playing baseball at Stony Brook University. During his first season, he went 2–1 with a 5.68 ERA and 42 strikeouts in 18 games, 8 of which were starts. During his sophomore season, Koehler went 4–5 with a 5.17 ERA in 14 games, making 11 starts. After the season, he was named to the All-America East Second Team. In his junior year, Koehler went 5–8 with a 4.98 ERA, 1 complete game, and 87 strikeouts in 13 starts. Koehler went 6–5 with a 4.15 ERA, 2 complete games, and 111 strikeouts in 14 starts during his senior season. Koehler was the last player at Stony Brook to wear No. 22, which was retired for Joe Nathan in 2006. The Florida Marlins drafted Koehler during the 18th round of the 2008 Major League Baseball draft.

== Professional career ==
=== Miami Marlins ===
==== Minor leagues ====
Koehler signed with the Marlins on June 5, 2008. He was assigned to the Class-A Short-Season Jamestown Jammers of the New York–Penn League to start his professional career. He went 5–5 for the season with a 3.68 ERA and 58 strikeouts in 15 games. During the 2009 season, Koehler played with the Class-A Greensboro Grasshoppers, and the Class A-Advanced Jupiter Hammerheads. With the Grasshoppers of the South Atlantic League, he went 5–5 with a 3.20 ERA and 82 strikeouts in 18 starts. He then received a promotion to the Jupiter Hammerheads of the Florida State League, where he went 4–1 with a 3.38 ERA and 25 strikeouts in 6 starts. Between the two clubs that year, Koehler earned a combined record of 9–6 with a 3.25 ERA and 107 strikeouts in 133 innings pitched.

Koehler started the 2010 season with the Double-A Jacksonville Suns. He was selected to play in the Southern League All-Star Game that season. During the 2010 season, Koehler went 16–2 with a 2.61 ERA and 145 strikeouts in 28 starts. Among league pitchers, Koehler led in wins, and was second in both innings pitched and strikeouts. At the end of the season, Koehler won the Southern League Most Outstanding Pitcher Award. He also tied a Jacksonville Suns franchise record with 16 wins. In 2011, he pitched for the New Orleans Zephyrs of the Triple-A Pacific Coast League and was 12–7 with a 4.97 ERA. The following season, he appeared in 28 games for the Zephyrs and was 12–11 with a 4.17 ERA.

==== Major leagues ====
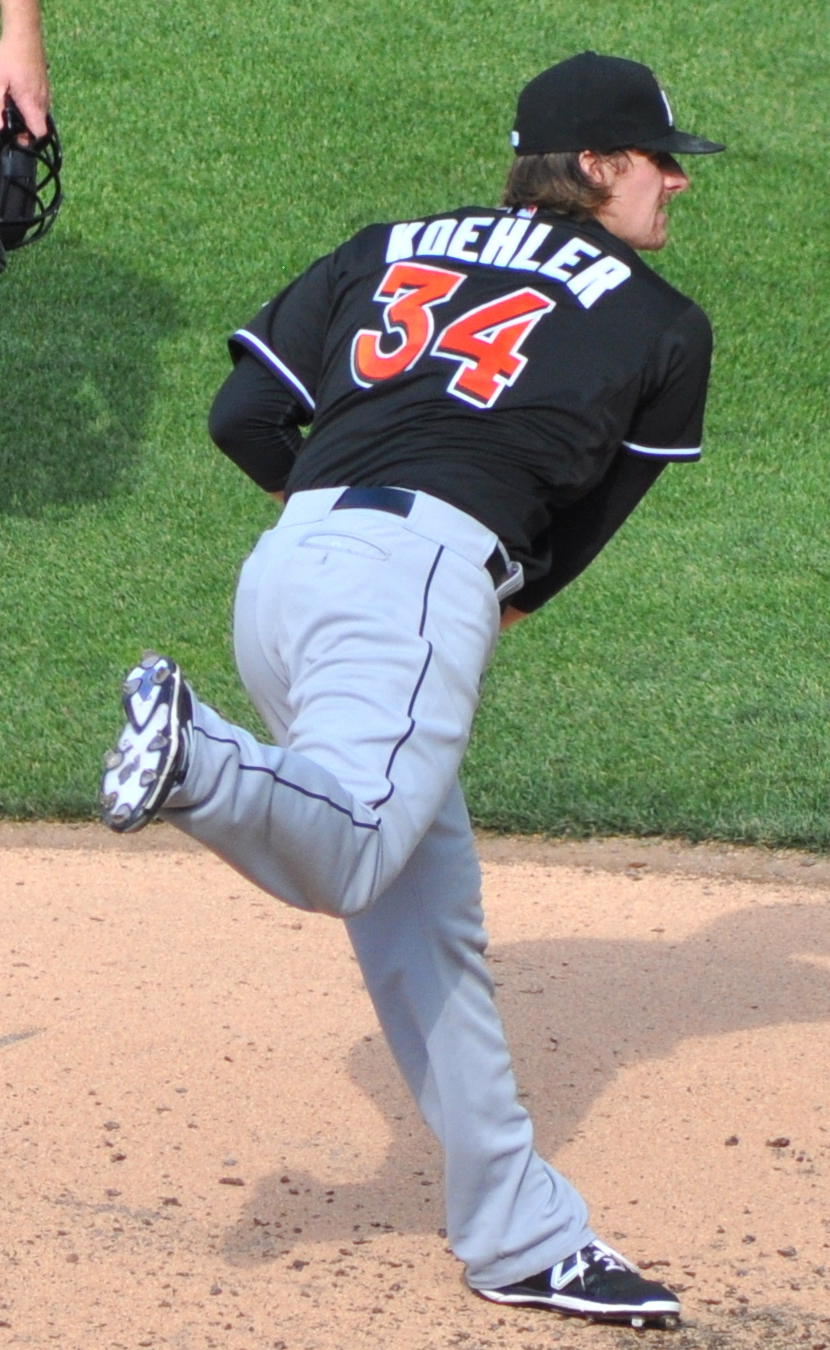
Koehler with the Miami Marlins in 2015

Koehler made his major league debut on September 5, 2012, against the Milwaukee Brewers. He struck out the first batter he faced (Martín Maldonado), and pitched two innings, allowing four runs. He finished the season with a 5.40 ERA and 13 strikeouts in 13 1/3 innings pitched. He made his first MLB start in the last game of the season against the New York Mets, in which he went five innings, allowing three earned runs and striking out three batters in a 4–2 Marlins loss.

Koehler began the 2013 season with the Zephyrs and became the franchise's all-time strikeout leader on April 14 when he picked up his 267th against the Round Rock Express. He was called back up to the Marlins on April 19 to fill a long relief role and made six relief appearances before moving to the rotation to replace Wade LeBlanc. He earned his first major league win against the San Francisco Giants on June 20, pitching seven innings and allowing only one run. He finished the season with a 5–10 record and a 4.41 ERA in 143 innings pitched.

Through the 2014 to 2016 seasons, Koehler made 96 starts for the Marlins. He posted a 3.81 ERA in 32 starts in 2014, a 4.08 ERA in 31 starts in 2015, and a 4.33 ERA in 33 starts in 2016. During the 2017 season, he made 12 starts for the Marlins with a 1–5 record and 7.92 ERA in 55 2/3 innings. Overall he pitched in 146 games for the Marlins over parts of six seasons with 132 starts and was 36–53 with a 4.43 ERA.

=== Toronto Blue Jays ===
On August 19, 2017, the Marlins traded Koehler to the Toronto Blue Jays for minor league pitcher Osman Gutierrez. He made his first start for the Blue Jays on August 24, pitching five innings, allowing one run, and striking out seven batters in a 2–0 loss to the Tampa Bay Rays. He was then moved to the bullpen, where he made 14 appearances. Koehler finished the 2017 season with a 2.65 ERA and 18 strikeouts in the 17 innings he pitched for Toronto. He was non-tendered on December 1, making him a free agent.

=== Los Angeles Dodgers ===
On December 20, 2017, Koehler signed a one-year, $2 million, incentive laden contract with the Los Angeles Dodgers. However, he suffered a strained right shoulder in a spring training game and was shut down for the start of the season. He underwent season ending shoulder surgery in July and was shut down for the season without appearing in any games for the Dodgers. The Dodgers released him on November 20, 2018.

=== Pittsburgh Pirates ===
On February 6, 2019, Koehler agreed to a minor league contract with the Pittsburgh Pirates. He was invited to Spring Training for the 2020 season.

On March 2, 2020, Koehler announced his retirement from professional baseball.

== Pitching style ==
Koehler throws a four seam fastball, a slider, changeup and a curveball.

== Personal life ==
Koehler was born on June 29, 1986, in the Bronx, New York. He has one sister, Erica. His parents are Theresa and Rolf Koehler. He married Ashley Westphal, a former softball player at Stony Brook, and they have two daughters.
