= 2013 Cincinnati Reds season =

2013 Cincinnati Reds
- National League Wild Card winners
- League: National League
- Division: Central
- Ballpark: Great American Ball Park
- City: Cincinnati, Ohio
- Record: 90–72 (.556)
- Divisional place: 3rd
- Owners: Bob Castellini
- General managers: Walt Jocketty
- Managers: Dusty Baker
- Television: Fox Sports Ohio (Thom Brennaman, Chris Welsh, Jim Kelch, George Grande, Jeff Brantley, Jim Day, Jeff Piecoro)
- Radio: WLW (700 AM); Reds Radio Network (Marty Brennaman, Jeff Brantley, Jim Kelch, Thom Brennaman)
- Stats: ESPN.com; Baseball Reference

The 2013 Cincinnati Reds season was the 144th season for the franchise in Major League Baseball, and their 11th at Great American Ball Park. During the 2013 season, the Reds returned to the playoffs for a second straight season, after a 97–65 season in 2012, in which they lost in 5 games in the NLDS. On September 23, due to the Washington Nationals' loss to the St. Louis Cardinals, the Reds clinched a spot in the post-season. They entered the playoffs as a Wild Card team, becoming the first team to qualify for the postseason after finishing third in their respective division. They lost in the NLWC Game to the Pittsburgh Pirates. This was the Reds' last winning season and playoff appearance until 2020, and their last playoff appearance in a full season until 2025.

== Notable offseason acquisitions/roster moves ==
- December 11, 2012: As part of a three-team deal with the Arizona Diamondbacks and the Cleveland Indians, the Reds sent Didi Gregorius to Arizona and traded outfielder Drew Stubbs to Cleveland for outfielder Shin-Soo Choo and infielder Jason Donald and cash.
- December 13, 2012: Signed infielder Jack Hannahan as a free agent.
- December 20, 2012: Signed outfielder Derrick Robinson as a free agent.
- January 14, 2013: Signed infielder César Izturis as a free agent.
- January 17, 2013: Signed pitcher Armando Galarraga as a free agent.

== Standings ==
=== National League Central ===
NL Central
Team	W	L	Pct.	GB	Home	Road
St. Louis Cardinals	97	65	.599	—	54‍–‍27	43‍–‍38
Pittsburgh Pirates	94	68	.580	3	50‍–‍31	44‍–‍37
Cincinnati Reds	90	72	.556	7	49‍–‍31	41‍–‍41
Milwaukee Brewers	74	88	.457	23	37‍–‍44	37‍–‍44
Chicago Cubs	66	96	.407	31	31‍–‍50	35‍–‍46

=== National League Wild Card ===
Division winners
Team	W	L	Pct.
St. Louis Cardinals	97	65	.599
Atlanta Braves	96	66	.593
Los Angeles Dodgers	92	70	.568

Wild Card teams (Top 2 teams qualify for postseason)
Team	W	L	Pct.	GB
Pittsburgh Pirates	94	68	.580	+4
Cincinnati Reds	90	72	.556	—
Washington Nationals	86	76	.531	4
Arizona Diamondbacks	81	81	.500	9
San Francisco Giants	76	86	.469	14
San Diego Padres	76	86	.469	14
Colorado Rockies	74	88	.457	16
New York Mets	74	88	.457	16
Milwaukee Brewers	74	88	.457	16
Philadelphia Phillies	73	89	.451	17
Chicago Cubs	66	96	.407	24
Miami Marlins	62	100	.383	28

=== Record vs. opponents ===
2013 National League record Source: MLB Standings Grid – 2013
Team	AZ	ATL	CHC	CIN	COL	LAD	MIA	MIL	NYM	PHI	PIT	SD	SF	STL	WSH	AL
Arizona	—	2–4	4–3	3–4	12–7	10–9	4–2	6–1	3–4	3–4	3–3	7–12	7–12	4–3	2–4	11–9
Atlanta	4–2	—	5–1	4–3	6–1	5–2	13–6	2–4	10–9	11–8	4–3	1–5	3–4	4–3	13–6	11–9
Chicago	3–4	1–5	—	5–14	3–3	1–6	4–3	6–13	3–3	3–3	7–12	3–4	4–3	7–12	3–4	13–7
Cincinnati	4–3	3–4	14–5	—	2–4	4–3	6–1	10–9	4–2	4–2	8–11	3–3	6–1	8–11	3–4	11–9
Colorado	7–12	1–6	3–3	4–2	—	10–9	3–4	4–2	3–4	3–4	4–2	12–7	9–10	3–4	3–4	5–15
Los Angeles	9–10	2–5	6–1	3–4	9–10	—	5–2	4–2	5–1	5–2	4–2	11–8	8–11	4–3	5–1	12–8
Miami	2–4	6–13	3–4	1–6	4–3	2–5	—	1–5	11–8	7–12	2–4	3–4	4–3	2–4	5–14	9–11
Milwaukee	1–6	4–2	13–6	9–10	2–4	2–4	5–1	—	4–3	5–2	7–12	3–4	5–2	5–14	3–4	6–14
New York	4–3	9–10	3–3	2–4	4–3	1–5	8–11	3–4	—	10–9	2–5	4–3	4–2	2–5	7–12	11–9
Philadelphia	4–3	8–11	3–3	2–4	4–3	2–5	12–7	2–5	9–10	—	3–4	4–2	3–3	2–5	8–11	7–13
Pittsburgh	3–3	3–4	12–7	11–8	2–4	2–4	4–2	12–7	5–2	4–3	—	3–4	4–3	10–9	4–3	15–5
San Diego	12–7	5–1	4–3	3–3	7–12	8–11	4–3	4–3	3–4	2–4	4–3	—	8–11	2–4	2–5	8–12
San Francisco	12–7	4–3	3–4	1–6	10–9	11–8	3–4	2–5	2–4	3–3	3–4	11–8	—	2–4	3–3	6–14
St. Louis	3–4	3–4	12–7	11–8	4–3	3–4	4–2	14–5	5–2	5–2	9–10	4–2	4–2	—	6–0	10–10
Washington	4–2	6–13	4–3	4–3	4–3	1–5	14–5	4–3	12–7	11–8	3–4	5–2	3–3	0–6	—	11–9

== Regular season ==
=== Detailed record ===
Team	Home	Away	Total	Win %
NL East
Atlanta Braves	1–2	2–2	3–4	.429
Miami Marlins	3–1	3–0	6–1	.857
New York Mets	1–2	3–0	4–2	.667
Philadelphia Phillies	3–0	1–2	4–2	.667
Washington Nationals	2–1	1–3	3–4	.429
	**10–6**	**10–7**	**20–13**	**.606**
NL Central
Chicago Cubs	5–4	9–1	14–5	.737
Milwaukee Brewers	6–3	4–6	10–9	.526
Pittsburgh Pirates	4–6	4–5	8–11	.421
St. Louis Cardinals	5–5	3–6	8–11	.421
	**20–18**	**20–18**	**40–36**	**.526**
NL West
Arizona Diamondbacks	3–1	1–2	4–3	.571
Colorado Rockies	1–2	1–2	2–4	.333
Los Angeles Dodgers	3–0	1–3	4–3	.571
San Diego Padres	2–1	1–2	3–3	.500
San Francisco Giants	3–1	3–0	6–1	.857
	**12–5**	**7–9**	**19–14**	**.576**
American League
Cleveland Indians	2–0	0–2	2–2	.500
Houston Astros	N/A	3–0	3–0	1.000
Los Angeles Angels of Anaheim	2–1	N/A	2–1	.667
Oakland Athletics	2–0	0–2	2–2	.500
Seattle Mariners	1–2	N/A	1–2	.333
Texas Rangers	N/A	1–2	1–2	.333
	**7–3**	**4–6**	**11–9**	**.550**

Month	Games	Won	Lost	Win %
April	28	15	13	.536
May	27	19	8	.704
June	27	12	15	.444
July	27	14	13	.519
August	27	16	11	.593
September	23	14	12	.538
	**159**	**90**	**72**	**.556**

	Games	Won	Lost	Win %
Home	80	49	31	.613
Away	82	41	41	.500

- Most Runs Scored in a game: **15** (4/5 vs. Washington)
- Most Runs Allowed in a game: **12** (6/5 vs. Colorado)
- Longest Winning Streak: **6 Games** (5/10-5/16)
- Longest Losing Streak: **5 Games** (4/9-4/14)

=== Game log ===
2013 game log (90–72)
April (15–13)

#	Date	TV	Opponent	Score	Win	Loss	Save	Attendance	Record	Box
1	April 1	Angels	FSO	**L** 1–3 (13)	Lowe (1–0)	**Hoover** (0–1)	Frieri (1)	43,168	0–1	
2	April 3	Angels	FSO	**W** 5–4	**Chapman** (1–0)	Downs (0–1)		35,257	1–1	
3	April 4	Angels	FSO	**W** 5–4	**Arroyo** (1–0)	Blanton (0–1)	**Chapman** (1)	23,795	2–1	
4	April 5	Nationals	FSO	**W** 15–0	**Bailey** (1–0)	Haren (0–1)		28,102	3–1	
5	April 6	Nationals	FSO	**L** 6–7 (11)	Stammen (1–0)	**Hoover** (0–2)		34,762	3–2	
6	April 7	Nationals	FSO	**W** 6–3	**Cueto** (1–0)	Strasburg (1–1)	**Chapman** (2)	32,514	4–2	
7	April 8	@ Cardinals	FSO	**W** 13–4	**LeCure** (1–0)	Boggs (0–1)		47,345	5–2	
8	April 9	@ Cardinals	FSO	**L** 1–5	Lynn (1–0)	**Arroyo** (1–1)		37,731	5–3	
9	April 10	@ Cardinals	FSO	**L** 0–10	Westbrook (1–1)	**Bailey** (1–1)		34,882	5–4	
10	April 12	@ Pirates	FSO	**L** 5–6	Watson (1–0)	**Hoover** (0–3)	Grilli (4)	24,366	5–5	
11	April 13	@ Pirates	FSO	**L** 1–3	Locke (1–1)	**Simón** (0–1)	Grilli (5)	25,118	5–6	
12	April 14	@ Pirates	FSO	**L** 7–10	Hughes (1–0)	**Broxton** (0–1)		19,239	5–7	
13	April 15	Phillies	ESPN	**W** 4–2	**Arroyo** (2–1)	Horst (0–1)	**Chapman** (3)	17,345	6–7	
14	April 16	Phillies	FSO	**W** 1–0	**Chapman** (2–0)	Aumont (1–2)		15,544	7–7	
15	April 17	Phillies	ESPN2	**W** 11–2	**Leake** (1–0)	Lannan (0–1)		16,467	8–7	
16	April 18	Marlins	FSO	**W** 11–1	**Cingrani** (1–0)	Fernández (0–1)		14,916	9–7	
17	April 19	Marlins	FSO	**L** 1–2	Dunn (1–0)	**Chapman** (2–1)	Cishek (1)	26,112	9–8	
18	April 20	Marlins	FSO	**W** 3–2 (13)	**Simón** (1–1)	Cishek (1–2)		35,645	10–8	
19	April 21	Marlins	FSO	**W** 10–6	**Ondrusek** (1–0)	Sanabia (2–2)		28,882	11–8	
20	April 22	Cubs	FSO	**W** 5–4 (13)	**Simón** (2–1)	Bowden (0–1)		18,090	12–8	
21	April 23	Cubs	FSO	**L** 2–4 (10)	Mármol (1–0)	**Parra** (0–1)	Gregg (1)	24,021	12–9	
22	April 24	Cubs	MLBN	**W** 1–0	**Latos** (1–0)	Samardzija (1–4)	**Chapman** (4)	16,426	13–9	
23	April 25	@ Nationals	FSO	**L** 1–8	Gonzalez (2–1)	**Arroyo** (2–2)		24,748	13–10	
24	April 26	@ Nationals	FSO	**L** 0–1	Zimmermann (4–1)	**Bailey** (1–2)		32,995	13–11	
25	April 27	@ Nationals	Fox	**L** 3–6	Haren (2–3)	**Leake** (1–1)	Soriano (7)	38,903	13–12	
26	April 28	@ Nationals	FSO	**W** 5–2	**Cingrani** (2–0)	Detwiler (1–2)	**Chapman** (5)	36,457	14–12	
27	April 29	@ Cardinals	FSO	**W** 2–1	**Latos** (2–0)	Wainwright (4–2)	**Chapman** (6)	36,381	15–12	
28	April 30	@ Cardinals	FSO	**L** 1–2	García (3–1)	**Arroyo** (2–3)	Mujica (5)	37,535	15–13	

May (19–8)

#	Date	TV	Opponent	Score	Win	Loss	Save	Attendance	Record	Box
29	May 1	@ Cardinals	FSO	**L**2–4	Lynn (5–0)	**Bailey** (1–3)	Mujica (6)	39,821	15–14	
30	May 3	@ Cubs	FSO	**W** 6–5	**Leake** (2–1)	Villanueva (1–2)	**Hoover** (1)	32,579	16–14	
31	May 4	@ Cubs	FSO	**W** 6–4	**Ondrusek** (2–0)	Mármol (2–2)	**Chapman** (7)	36,455	17–14	
32	May 5	@ Cubs	FSO	**W** 7–4	**Latos** (3–0)	Jackson (0–5)	**Hoover** (2)	33,449	18–14	
33	May 6	Braves	FSO	**L** 4–7	Maholm (4–3)	**Arroyo** (2–4)	Kimbrel (10)	19,308	18–15	
34	May 7	Braves	FSO	**W** 5–4	**Broxton** (1–1)	Kimbrel (0–1)		25,730	19–15	
35	May 8	Braves	MLBN	**L** 2–7	Minor (4–2)	**Leake** (2–2)		36,640	19–16	
36	May 10	Brewers	FSO	**W** 4–3	**Simón** (3–1)	Gallardo (3–2)	**Chapman** (8)	33,251	20–16	
37	May 11	Brewers	FSO	**W** 13–7	**Latos** (4–0)	Burgo (1–1)		41,678	21–16	
38	May 12	Brewers	FSO	**W** 5–1	**Arroyo** (3–4)	Peralta (1–1)		38,813	22–16	
39	May 14	@ Marlins	FSO	**W** 6–2	**Bailey** (2–3)	Nolasco (2–5)		14,694	23–16	
40	May 15	@ Marlins	FSO	**W** 4–0	**Leake** (3–2)	Sanabia (2–6)		14,866	24–16	
41	May 16	@ Marlins	FSO	**W** 5–3 (10)	**Chapman** (3–1)	Cishek (1–4)	**Hoover** (3)	16,680	25–16	
42	May 17	@ Phillies	FSO	**L** 3–5	De Fratus (2–0)	**Marshall** (0–1)	Papelbon (8)	43,129	25–17	
43	May 18	@ Phillies	Fox	**W** 10–0	**Arroyo** (4–4)	Kendrick (4–2)		41,817	26–17	
44	May 19	@ Phillies	FSO	**L** 2–3	Bastardo (2–1)	**Chapman** (3–2)		41,009	26–18	
45	May 20	@ Mets	FSO	**W** 4–3	**Cueto** (2–0)	Marcum (0–5)	**Chapman** (9)	23,038	27–18	
46	May 21	@ Mets	FSO	**W** 4–0	**Leake** (4–2)	Niese (3–5)		23,183	28–18	
47	May 22	@ Mets	FSO	**W** 7–4	**Simón** (4–1)	Parnell (4–1)	**Chapman** (10)	30,415	29–18	
48	May 24	Cubs	FSO	**W** 7–4	**Arroyo** (5–4)	Feldman (4–4)	**Chapman** (11)	40,716	30–18	
49	May 25	Cubs	FSO	**W** 5–2	**Bailey** (3–3)	Wood (4–3)	**Chapman** (12)	40,909	31–18	
50	May 26	Cubs	FSO	**L** 4–5	Gregg (1–0)	**Hoover** (0–4)		41,321	31–19	
51	May 27	Indians	FSO	**W** 4–2	**Broxton** (2–1)	Hagadone (0–1)	**Chapman** (13)	38,822	32–19	
52	May 28	Indians	FSO	**W** 8–2	**Latos** (5–0)	McAllister (4–4)		28,812	33–19	
53	May 29	@ Indians	FSO	**L** 2–5	Masterson (8–3)	**Arroyo** (5–5)		18,004	33–20	
54	May 30	@ Indians	FSO	**L** 1–7	Kazmir (3–2)	**Bailey** (3–4)		18,364	33–21	
55	May 31	@ Pirates	FSO	**W** 6–0	**Cueto** (3–0)	Rodríguez (6–3)		35,730	34–21	

June (12–15)

#	Date	TV	Opponent	Score	Win	Loss	Save	Attendance	Record	Box
56	June 1	@ Pirates	Fox	**W** 2–0	**Leake** (5–2)	Liriano (3–2)	**Chapman** (14)	33,912	35–21	
57	June 2	@ Pirates	FSO	**L** 4–5 (11)	Wilson (5–0)	**Simón** (4–2)		29,407	35–22	
58	June 3	Rockies	FSO	**W** 3–0	**Arroyo** (6–5)	Chatwood (3–1)	**Chapman** (15)	18,498	36–22	
59	June 4	Rockies	FSO	**L** 4–5	Outman (2–0)	**LeCure** (1–1)	Brothers (2)	27,031	36–23	
60	June 5	Rockies	FSO	**L** 4–12	Garland (4–6)	**Villarreal** (0–1)		26,665	36–24	
61	June 7	Cardinals	FSO	**L** 2–9	Wainwright (9–3)	**Leake** (5–3)		38,874	36–25	
62	June 8	Cardinals	Fox	**W** 4–2	**Latos** (6–0)	Lyons (2–2)	**Chapman** (16)	40,740	37–25	
63	June 9	Cardinals	ESPN	**L** 4–11 (10)	Rosenthal (1–0)	**Hoover** (0–5)		38,023	37–26	
64	June 10	@ Cubs	FSO	**W** 6–2	**Bailey** (4–4)	Feldman (5–5)		28,052	38–26	
65	June 11	@ Cubs	FSO	**W** 12–2	**Cingrani** (3–0)	Garza (1–1)		30,937	39–26	
66	June 12	@ Cubs	FSO	**W** 2–1	**Leake** (6–3)	Wood (5–5)	**Chapman** (17)	24,749	40–26	
67	June 13	@ Cubs	FSO	**L** 5–6 (14)	Rondon (1–0)	**Broxton** (5–5)		28,986	40–27	
68	June 14	Brewers	FSO	**W** 4–3 (10)	**Simón** (5–2)	Badenhop (0–3)		35,138	41–27	
69	June 15	Brewers	FSO	**L** 0–6	Gallardo (6–6)	**Bailey** (4–5)		37,519	41–28	
70	June 16	Brewers	FSO	**W** 5–1	**Cueto** (4–0)	Peralta (4–8)		39,088	42–28	
71	June 17	Pirates	FSO	**W** 4–1	**Leake** (7–3)	Liriano (5–3)	**Chapman** (18)	28,892	43–28	
72	June 18	Pirates	FSO	**L** 0–4	Morton (1–1)	**Latos** (6–1)		28,993	43–29	
73	June 19	Pirates	FSO	**W** 2–1 (13)	**Parra** (1–1)	Mazzaro (3–2)		36,567	44–29	
74	June 20	Pirates	FSO	**L** 3–5	Morris (4–2)	**Simón** (5–3)	Watson (2)	40,929	44–30	
75	June 21	@ Diamondbacks	FSO	**L** 5–11	Harris (1–0)	**Cueto** (4–1)		27,819	44–31	
76	June 22	@ Diamondbacks	Fox	**L** 3–4	Ziegler (4–1)	**Chapman** (3–3)		30,567	44–32	
77	June 23	@ Diamondbacks	FSO	**W** 4–2	**Latos** (7–1)	Delgado (0–1)	**Chapman** (19)	30,723	45–32	
78	June 25	@ Athletics	FSO	**L** 3–7	Neshek (2–1)	**Arroyo** (6–6)		17,506	45–33	
79	June 26	@ Athletics	FSO	**L** 0–5	Griffin (6–6)	**Bailey** (4–6)		25,658	45–34	
80	June 28	@ Rangers	FSO	**L** 0–4	Pérez (2–1)	**Cueto** (4–2)		41,218	45–35	
81	June 29	@ Rangers	Fox	**W** 6–4 (11)	**Hoover** (1–5)	McClellan (0–1)	**Chapman** (20)	44,397	46–35	
82	June 30	@ Rangers	FSO	**L** 2–3	Darvish (8–3)	**Latos** (7–2)	Nathan	39,078	46–36	

July (14–13)

#	Date	TV	Opponent	Score	Win	Loss	Save	Attendance	Record	Box
83	July 1	Giants	FSO	**W** 8–1 (6)	**Arroyo** (7–6)	Kickham (0–3)		30,702	47–36	
84	July 2	Giants	FSO	**W** 3–0	**Bailey** (5–6)	Lincecum (4–9)		27,509	48–36	
85	July 3	Giants	FSO	**W** 3–2 (11)	**Hoover** (2–5)	Lopez (1–1)		40,757	49–36	
–	July 4	Giants	Postponed (rain); Makeup: July 23 @SF							
86	July 5	Mariners	FSO	**L** 2–4	Harang (4–7)	**Leake** (7–4)	Pérez (2)	33,596	49–37	
87	July 6	Mariners	FSO	**W** 13–4	**Latos** (8–2)	Bonderman (1–3)		34,965	50–37	
88	July 7	Mariners	FSO	**L** 1–3	Saunders (7–8)	**Arroyo** (7–7)	Wilhelmsen (18)	32,669	50–38	
89	July 8	@ Brewers	FSO	**L** 3–4	Lohse (5–6)	**Bailey** (5–7)	Rodríguez (9)	25,341	50–39	
90	July 9	@ Brewers	FSO	**L** 0–2	Peralta (6–9)	**Cingrani** (3–1)		25,369	50–40	
91	July 10	@ Brewers	FSO	**W** 6–2	**Leake** (8–4)	Hellweg (0–3)		35,239	51–40	
92	July 11	@ Braves	FSO	**L** 5–6	Hudson (6–7)	**Latos** (8–3)	Kimbrel (25)	40,186	51–41	
93	July 12	@ Braves	FSO	**W** 4–2	**Arroyo** (8–7)	Medlen (6–9)	**Chapman** (21)	43,275	52–41	
94	July 13	@ Braves	FSO	**L** 2–5	Minor (9–4)	**Bailey** (5–8)	Kimbrel (26)	46,946	52–42	
95	July 14	@ Braves	FSO	**W** 8–4	**Ondrusek** (3–0)	Teherán (7–5)		29,846	53–42	
**July 16: 2013 MLB All-Star Game – New York City, New York at Citi Field** (AL 3, NL 0)
96	July 19	Pirates	FSO	**W** 5–3	**Leake** (9–4)	Liriano (9–4)	**Chapman** (22)	40,831	54–42	
97	July 20	Pirates	Fox	**W** 5–4	**Latos** (9–3)	Burnett (4–7)	**Chapman** (23)	34,728	55–42	
98	July 21	Pirates	FSO	**L** 2–3	Locke (9–2)	**Bailey** (5–9)	**Grilli** (30)	40,824	55–43	
99	July 22	@ Giants	FSO	**W** 11–0	**Arroyo** (9–7)	Lincecum (5–10)		41,797	56–43	
100	July 23	@ Giants	FSO	**W** 9–3	**Cingrani** (4–1)	Surkamp (0–1)			57–43	
101	July 23	Giants (Note: At AT&T Park. The Reds wore their home uniforms and batted last in each inning. However, this counted as an away game for statistical purposes.)	FSO	**L** 3–5	Casilla (4–2)	**Reynolds** (0–1)	Romo (24)	42,310	57–44	
102	July 24	@ Giants	FSO	**W** 8–3	**Leake** (10–4)	Gaudin (4–2)		41,512	58–44	
103	July 25	@ Dodgers	FSO	**W** 5–2	**Latos** (10–3)	Greinke (8–3)	**Chapman** (24)	53,275	59–44	
104	July 26	@ Dodgers	FSO	**L** 1–2	Kershaw (10–6)	**Bailey** (5–10)	Jansen (13)	51,841	59–45	
105	July 27	@ Dodgers	FSO	**L** 1–4	Ryu (9–3)	**Arroyo** (9–8)	Jansen (14)	52,675	59–46	
106	July 28	@ Dodgers	FSO	**L** 0–1	League (6–3)	**Partch** (0–1)		48,671	59–47	
107	July 29	@ Padres	FSO	**L** 1–2	Gregerson (5–5)	**Chapman** (3–4)		24,050	59–48	
108	July 30	@ Padres	FSO	**L** 2–4	Thayer (1–3)	**Parra** (1–2)	Street (20)	29,207	59–49	
109	July 31	@ Padres	FSO	**W** 4–1	**Bailey** (6–10)	Stults (8–10)	Chapman (25)	26,450	60–49	

August (16–11)

#	Date	TV	Opponent	Score	Win	Loss	Save	Attendance	Record	Box
110	August 2	Cardinals	FSO	**L** 3–13	Miller (11–7)	**Arroyo** (9–9)		39,095	60–50	
111	August 3	Cardinals	FSO	**W** 8–3	**Cingrani** (5–1)	Westbrook (7–6)		41,598	61–50	
112	August 4	Cardinals	FSO	**L** 2–15	Lynn (13–5)	**Leake** (10–5)		39,618	61–51	
113	August 6	Athletics	FSO	**W** 3–1	**Latos** (11–3)	Straily (6–6)	**Chapman** (26)	34,640	62–51	
114	August 7	Athletics		**W** 6–5	**Bailey** (7–10)	Colón (14–4)	**Chapman** (27)	29,746	63–51	
115	August 9	Padres	FSO	**W** 7–2	**Arroyo** (10–9)	Cashner (8–6)		30,288	64–51	
116	August 10	Padres	FSO	**L** 1–3	Ross (3–5)	**Cingrani** (5–2)	Street (22)	34,777	64–52	
117	August 11	Padres	FSO	**W** 3–2 (13)	**LeCure** (2–1)	Stauffer (1–1)		38,567	65–52	
118	August 12	@ Cubs	FSO	**W** 2–0	**Latos** (12–3)	Wood (7–9)	**Chapman** (28)	33,277	66–52	
119	August 13	@ Cubs	FSO	**W** 6–4 (11)	**Hoover** (3–5)	Sánchez (0–1)	**Chapman** (29)	33,286	67–52	
120	August 14	@ Cubs	FSO	**W** 5–0	**Arroyo** (11–9)	Rusin (2–2)		33,642	68–52	
121	August 15	@ Brewers	FSO	**W** 2–1	**Cingrani** (6–2)	Lohse (8–8)	**Chapman** (30)	36,076	69–52	
122	August 16	@ Brewers	FSO	**L** 6–7	Axford (6–6)	**Chapman** (3–5)		33,037	69–53	
123	August 17	@ Brewers	FSO	**L** 0–2	Gallardo (9–9)	**Latos** (12–4)	Henderson (18)	37,046	69–54	
124	August 18	@ Brewers	FSO	**W** 9–1	**Bailey** (8–10)	Peralta (8–13)		34,175	70–54	
125	August 19	Diamondbacks	FSO	**W** 5–3	**Arroyo** (12–9)	Delgado (4–4)	**Chapman** (31)	20,349	71–54	
126	August 20	Diamondbacks	FSO	**L** 2–5	Corbin (13–3)	**Cingrani** (6–3)		20,092	71–55	
127	August 21	Diamondbacks	FSO	**W** 10–7	**Leake** (11–5)	McCarthy (2–8)	**Chapman** (32)	23,297	72–55	
128	August 22	Diamondbacks		**W** 2–1	**Latos** (13–4)	De La Rosa (0–1)	**LeCure** (1)	21,166	73–55	
129	August 23	Brewers	FSO	**L** 4–6	Wooten (2–0)	**Simón** (5–4)	**Henderson** (20)	34,230	73–56	
130	August 24	Brewers	FSO	**W** 6–3	**Arroyo** (13–9)	Axford (6–7)	**Chapman** (33)	33,430	74–56	
131	August 25	Brewers	FSO	**L** 1–3	Estrada (6–4)	**Reynolds** (0–2)	Henderson (21)	33,743	74–57	
132	August 26	@ Cardinals	FSO	**L** 6–8	Martinez (1–1)	**Parra** (1–3)	Mujica (35)	35,159	74–58	
133	August 27	@ Cardinals	FSO	**L** 1–6	Kelly (6–3)	**Latos** (13–5)		35,201	74–59	
134	August 28	@ Cardinals	FSO	**W** 10–0	**Bailey** (9–10)	Wainwright (15–8)		35,698	75–59	
135	August 30	@ Rockies	FSO	**L** 6–9	de la Rosa (15–6)	**Arroyo** (13–10)		29,415	75–60	
136	August 31	@ Rockies	FSO	**W** 8–3	**Reynolds** (1–2)	Nicasio (8–7)		37,616	76–60	

September (14–12)

#	Date	TV	Opponent	Score	Win	Loss	Save	Attendance	Record	Box
137	September 1	@ Rockies	FSO	**L** 4–7	Ottavino (1–2)	**Leake** (11–6)		30,594	76–61	
138	September 2	Cardinals	FSO	**W** 7–2	**Latos** (14–5)	Wainwright (15–9)		32,951	77–61	
139	September 3	Cardinals	FSO	**W** 1–0	**Bailey** (10–10)	Maness (5–2)	**Chapman** (34)	20,219	78–61	
130	September 4	Cardinals	FSO	**L** 4–5 (16)	Martinez (2–1)	**Ondrusek** (3–1)		23,894	78–62	
141	September 5	Cardinals	FSO	**W** 6–2	**Cingrani** (7–3)	Lynn (13–10)		21,418	79–62	
142	September 6	Dodgers	FSO	**W** 3–2	**Leake** (12–6)	Howell (2–1)	**Chapman** (35)	33,778	80–62	
143	September 7	Dodgers	Fox	**W** 4–3 (10)	**Hoover** (4–5)	Wilson (1–1)		40,799	81–62	
144	September 8	Dodgers	ESPN	**W** 3–2	**Chapman** (4–5)	Belisario (5–7)		34,041	82–62	
145	September 9	Cubs	FSO	**L** 0–2	Wood (9–11)	**Arroyo** (13–11)	Gregg (31)	22,920	82–63	
146	September 10	Cubs	FSO	**L** 1–9	Jackson (8–15)	**Cingrani** (7–4)		21,396	82–64	
147	September 11	Cubs		**W** 6–0	**Leake** (13–6)	Samardzija (8–12)		22,088	83–64	
148	September 13	@ Brewers	FSO	**L** 1–5	Lohse (10–9)	**Latos** (14–6)		39,665	83–65	
149	September 14	@ Brewers	Fox	**W** 7–3	**Bailey** (11–10)	Hellweg (1–4)	**Chapman** (36)	25,929	84–65	
150	September 15	@ Brewers	FSO	**L** 5–6	Henderson (4–5)	**Duke** (1–2)		26,725	84–66	
151	September 16	@ Astros	FSO	**W** 6–1	**Cueto** (5–2)	Bédard (4–11)		15,449	85–66	
152	September 17	@ Astros	FSO	**W** 10–0	**Leake** (14–6)	Lyles (7–8)		25,582	86–66	
153	September 18	@ Astros	FSO	**W** 6–5 (13)	**Simón** (6–4)	De Leon (0–1)	**Chapman** (37)	29,701	87–66	
154	September 20	@ Pirates	FSO	**W** 6–5 (10)	**Hoover** (5–5)	Farnsworth (3–1)	**Chapman** (38)	37,940	88–66	
155	September 21	@ Pirates	FSO	**L** 2–4	Burnett (9–11)	**Bailey** (11–11)	Grilli (31)	39,425	88–67	
156	September 22	@ Pirates	FSO	**W** 11–3	**Arroyo** (14–11)	Locke (10–7)		38,699	89–67	
157	September 23	Mets	FSO	**W** 3–2 (10)	**Parra** (2–3)	Burke (0–3)		21,269	90–67	
158	September 24	Mets	FSO	**L** 2–4	Niese (8–8)	**Leake** (14–7)	Black (1)	28,887	90–68	
159	September 25	Mets		**L** 0–1	Matsuzaka (3–3)	**Latos** (14–7)	Hawkins (13)	26,223	90–69	
160	September 27	Pirates	FSO	**L** 1–4	Burnett (10–11)	**Bailey** (11–12)	Grilli (33)	40,107	90–70	
161	September 28	Pirates	FSO	**L** 3–8	Mazzaro (8–2)	**Arroyo** (14–12)		40,707	90–71	
162	September 29	Pirates	FSO	**L** 2–4	Cumpton (2–1)	**Reynolds** (1–3)	Farnsworth (2)	40,142	90–72	

Legend
= Win
= Loss
= Postponement
**Bold** = Reds team member

== Roster ==
2013 Cincinnati Reds
Roster
Pitchers: 61 Bronson Arroyo; 34 Homer Bailey; 51 Jonathan Broxton; 54 Aroldis Chapman; 58 Nick Christiani; 52 Tony Cingrani; 47 Johnny Cueto; 30 Zach Duke; 56 Justin Freeman; 60 J. J. Hoover; 55 Mat Latos; 44 Mike Leake; 63 Sam LeCure; 45 Sean Marshall; 66 Logan Ondrusek; 43 Manny Parra; 46 Curtis Partch; 40 Greg Reynolds; 31 Alfredo Simón; 65 Pedro Villarreal	Catchers: 29 Ryan Hanigan; 39 Devin Mesoraco; 37 Corky Miller; Infielders: 2 Zack Cozart; 21 Todd Frazier; 9 Jack Hannahan; 3 César Izturis; 4 Brandon Phillips; 36 Henry Rodríguez; 50 Neftalí Soto; 19 Joey Votto	Outfielders: 32 Jay Bruce; 17 Shin-Soo Choo; 6 Billy Hamilton; 28 Chris Heisey; 48 Ryan Ludwick; 23 Donald Lutz; 26 Xavier Paul; 15 Derrick Robinson	Manager: 12 Dusty Baker; Coaches: 41 Mark Berry (third base); 22 Billy Hatcher (first base); 49 Brook Jacoby (hitting); 57 Mack Jenkins (assistant pitching); 59 Juan López (bullpen); 62 Ronnie Ortegon (assistant hitting); 38 Bryan Price (pitching); 35 Chris Speier (bench); 72 Mike Stefanski (bullpen catcher)

=== Opening day lineup ===
- C – Ryan Hanigan
- P – Johnny Cueto
- 1B – Joey Votto
- 2B – Brandon Phillips
- 3B – Todd Frazier
- SS – Zack Cozart
- LF – Ryan Ludwick
- CF – Shin-Soo Choo
- RF – Jay Bruce

== Postseason ==
=== Wild Card Game ===
Wild Card, October 1

8:07 p.m. (EDT) at PNC Park in Pittsburgh, Pennsylvania

Team	1	2	3	4	5	6	7	8	9	R	H	E
Cincinnati	0	0	0	1	0	0	0	1	0	2	6	1
Pittsburgh	0	2	1	2	0	0	1	0	X	6	13	0
WP: Liriano (1–0) LP: Cueto (0–1) Sv: None; Home runs: Cin: Choo (1); Pit: Byrd (1), Martin 2 (2)

== Player statistics ==
Stats through: September 29, 2013

Batting

Note: G = Games played; AB = At bats; R = Runs scored; H = Hits; 2B Doubles; 3B = Triples; HR = Home runs; RBI = Runs batted in; AVG = Batting average; SB = Stolen bases

Player	G	AB	R	H	2B	3B	HR	RBI	AVG	SB
Bronson Arroyo	30	59	0	4	0	0	0	0	.068	0
Homer Bailey	30	58	3	9	1	0	0	1	.155	0
Jay Bruce	160	626	89	164	43	1	30	109	.262	7
Aroldis Chapman	66	1	0	0	0	0	0	0	.000	0
Shin-Soo Choo	154	569	107	162	34	1	21	54	.285	20
Tony Cingrani	22	28	4	7	1	0	0	1	.250	1
Zack Cozart	151	567	74	144	30	3	12	63	.254	0
Johnny Cueto	9	20	1	3	0	0	0	1	.150	0
Zach Duke	13	1	0	1	0	0	0	0	1.000	0
Todd Frazier	150	531	63	124	29	3	19	73	.234	6
Billy Hamilton	13	19	9	7	2	0	0	1	.368	13
Ryan Hanigan	75	222	17	44	8	0	2	21	.198	0
Jack Hannahan	83	139	12	30	5	1	1	14	.216	0
Chris Heisey	87	224	29	53	11	1	9	23	.237	3
Cesar Izturis	63	129	6	27	8	0	0	11	.209	0
Mat Latos	31	71	3	9	2	0	0	4	.127	0
Mike Leake	29	63	8	12	2	1	0	2	.190	0
Ryan Ludwick	38	129	7	31	5	0	2	12	.240	0
Donald Lutz*	34	58	5	14	1	0	1	8	.241	2
Devin Mesoraco	103	323	31	77	13	0	9	42	.238	0
Corky Miller	17	35	2	9	5	0	0	8	.257	0
Manny Parra	52	2	1	1	0	0	0	0	.500	0
Curtis Partch	13	1	0	0	0	0	0	0	.000	0
Xavier Paul	97	209	24	51	12	0	7	32	.244	0
Brandon Phillips	151	606	80	158	24	2	18	103	.261	5
Greg Reynolds	5	7	1	1	1	0	0	0	.143	0
Derrick Robinson	102	192	21	49	7	3	0	8	.255	4
Henry Rodriguez	9	9	0	1	0	0	0	0	.111	0
Alfredo Simon	57	7	0	1	0	0	0	0	.143	0
Neftali Soto	13	12	0	0	0	0	0	0	.000	0
Pedro Villarreal*	2	1	0	0	0	0	0	0	.000	0
Joey Votto	162	581	101	177	30	3	24	73	.305	6
Team totals	162	5499	698	1370	274	20	155	664	.249	67

– Qualified for batting title (3.1 plate appearances per team game)

Pitching

Note: W = Wins; L = Losses; ERA = Earned run average; G = Games pitched; GS = Games started; SV = Saves; IP = Innings pitched; ER = Earned runs allowed; BB = Walks allowed; K = Strikeouts

Player	W	L	ERA	G	GS	SV	IP	ER	BB	K
Bronson Arroyo	14	12	3.79	32	32	0	202.0	85	34	124
Homer Bailey	11	12	3.49	32	32	0	209.0	81	54	199
Jonathan Broxton††	2	2	4.11	34	0	0	30.2	14	12	25
Aroldis Chapman	4	5	2.54	68	0	38	63.2	18	29	112
Nick Christiani	0	0	2.25	3	0	0	4.0	1	2	1
Tony Cingrani	7	4	2.92	23	18	0	104.2	34	43	120
Johnny Cueto	5	2	2.82	11	11	0	60.2	19	18	51
Zach Duke	0	1	0.84	14	0	0	10.2	1	2	7
Justin Freeman*	0	0	18.00	1	0	0	1.0	2	0	0
J. J. Hoover	5	5	2.86	69	0	3	66.0	21	26	67
Mat Latos	14	7	3.16	32	32	0	210.2	74	58	187
Mike Leake	14	7	3.37	31	31	0	192.1	72	48	122
Sam LeCure	2	1	2.66	63	0	1	61.0	18	24	66
Sean Marshall	0	1	1.74	16	0	0	10.1	2	2	10
Logan Ondrusek	3	1	4.09	52	0	0	55.0	25	16	53
Manny Parra	2	3	3.33	57	0	0	46.0	17	15	56
Curtis Partch	0	1	6.17	14	0	0	23.1	16	17	16
Greg Reynolds	1	3	5.52	6	5	0	29.1	18	6	13
Alfredo Simon	6	4	2.87	63	0	1	87.2	28	26	63
Pedro Villarreal*	0	1	12.71	2	1	0	5.2	8	3	4
Team totals	90	72	3.38	162	162	43	1473.2	554	435	1296

– Qualified for ERA title (1 inning pitched per team game)

Legend

* not on active roster
† on 15-day disabled list
†† on 60-day disabled list

== Farm System ==
=== Minor League Standings ===
Standings through: End of Season

Level	Team	League	Manager	W	L	Position
AAA	Louisville Bats	International League	Jim Riggleman	69	75	3rd Place, INT West (9 GB)
AA	Pensacola Blue Wahoos	Southern League	Delino DeShields	59	79	4th Place, SOU South (5½ GB) ††
High-A	Bakersfield Blaze	California League	Ken Griffey, Sr.	55	85	Last, CAL North (17 GB) ††
Low-A	Dayton Dragons	Midwest League	José Nieves	65	74	3rd, MWL East (7 GB) ††
Rookie
Rookie	Billings Mustangs	Pioneer League	Pat Kelly	28	46	Last, PIO North (14 GB) ††
Rookie	AZL Reds	Arizona League	Jonahan Perez	18	37	Last, AZL Central (8½ GB) ††
Rookie	DSL Reds	Dominican Summer League	Joel Noboa	37	31	2nd, DSL BC Baseball City (8½ GB)

† First Half
†† Second Half

=== 2013 Minor League Notes ===
- The Pensacola Blue Wahoos (Double-A) finished their first half with a record of 25–44, good for last place in the Southern League's southern division, 14 games back of the Mobile BayBears.
- The Bakersfield Blaze (High A) finished their first half with a record of 29–41, good for last place in the California League's northern division, 14 games back of the San Jose Giants.
- The Dayton Dragons (Low A) finished their first half with a record of 28–41, good for 6th place in the Midwest League's eastern division, 16 games back of the South Bend Silver Hawks.

== Honors and awards ==
All Stars:

- Joey Votto (4th selection)
- Brandon Phillips (3rd selection)
- Aroldis Chapman (2nd selection)
