= 2013 Chicago Cubs season =

2013 Chicago Cubs
- League: National League
- Division: Central
- Ballpark: Wrigley Field
- City: Chicago, Illinois
- Record: 66–96 (.407)
- Divisional place: 5th
- Owners: Tom Ricketts
- President of baseball operations: Theo Epstein
- General managers: Jed Hoyer
- Managers: Dale Sveum
- Television: WGN-TV; WGN America; CSN Chicago; CSN Chicago Plus; WCIU-TV (Len Kasper, Jim Deshaies, Luke Stuckmeyer)
- Radio: WGN (AM); Chicago Cubs Radio Network (Pat Hughes, Keith Moreland, Judd Sirott)

The 2013 Chicago Cubs season was the 142nd season of the Chicago Cubs franchise, the 138th in the National League and the 98th at Wrigley Field. The Cubs finished fifth and last in the National League Central with a record of 66–96. The Cubs began the season on April 1 at the Pittsburgh Pirates and finished the season on September 29 at the St. Louis Cardinals.

The season marked the second year of the Cubs rebuild under President of Baseball Operations Theo Epstein and General Manager Jed Hoyer which would result in the Cubs breaking their 108-year World Series drought and lead the Cubs to the 2016 World Series championship.

The season was the last season with the Cubs for manager Dale Sveum as he was fired following the season. The season was also the last season with the Cubs for slugger Alfonso Soriano who would be traded at the trade deadline.

During the season, the Cubs drafted future Rookie of the Year, MVP, and All Star Kris Bryant with the second overall pick of the 2013 draft. The Cubs would also acquire other players that would play important roles during their 2016 World Series season: Héctor Rondón was selected from the 2012 rule 5 draft from the Cleveland Indians on December 6, 2011, Jake Arrieta and Pedro Strop were acquired via trade with the Baltimore Orioles on July 2, and Carl Edwards Jr. and Justin Grimm were acquired via trade with the Texas Rangers on July 22.

== Offseason transactions ==
=== November 2012 ===
- November 2, selected Zach Putnam off waivers from the Colorado Rockies.
- November 3, Jim Adduci, Justin Berg, Adrian Cardenas, Brian Esposito, Jeff Frazier, Diory Hernandez, Rodrigo Lopez, Seth McClung, Blake Parker, Horacio Ramirez, Ryan Rowland-Smith, Miguel Socolovich, Matt Tolbert, and Jairo Asencio granted free agency.
- November 7, signed Blake Parker as a free agent.
- November 13, signed Scott Baker and Alberto Gonzalez as free agents.
- November 14, signed Brian Bogusevic and J.C. Boscan as free agents.
- November 16, signed Dioner Navarro as a free agent.
- November 19, signed Shawn Camp as a free agent.
- November 20, traded Jake Brigham to the Texas Rangers. Received Barret Loux (minors).
- November 21, released Bryan LaHair.
- November 27, signed Scott Feldman as a free agent.
- November 30, Jaye Chapman, Zach Putnam, and Ian Stewart granted free agency.

=== December ===
- December 6, drafted Hector Rondon from the Cleveland Indians in the 2012 rule 5 draft.
- December 7, signed Jensen Lewis and Kyuji Fujikawa as a free agent.
- December 12, signed Ian Stewart as a free agent. Selected Sandy Rosario off waivers from the Boston Red Sox.
- December 13, signed Cory Wade as a free agent.
- December 15, signed Chang-Yong Lim as a free agent.
- December 17, signed Drew Carpenter as a free agent.
- December 21, signed Brad Nelson and Nate Schierholtz as a free agent. Jeff Beliveau selected by the Texas Rangers off waivers. Sandy Rosario selected by the San Francisco Giants off waivers.
- December 25, signed Jaye Chapman and Zach Putnam as a free agent.
- December 27, signed Hisanori Takahashi as a free agent.
- December 31, signed Dayan Diaz as a free agent.

=== January 2013 ===
- January 2, signed Edwin Jackson as a free agent.
- January 3, signed Dontrelle Willis as a free agent.
- January 10, signed Brent Lillibridge and Darnell McDonald as a free agent.
- January 26, signed Carlos Villanueva as a free agent.

=== February ===
- February 10, signed Scott Hairston as a free agent.
- February 18, traded Tony Campana to the Arizona Diamondbacks. Received Jesus Castillo (minors) and Erick Leal (minors).

=== March ===
- March 22, released Jason Berken.
- March 27, selected Guillermo Moscoso off waivers from the Toronto Blue Jays.
- March 30, released Dontrelle Willis.

== Regular season transactions ==
=== April ===
- April 2, signed Ryan Sweeney as a free agent.
- April 3, signed Donnie Murphy as a free agent.
- April 4, released Jay Jackson.
- April 14, signed Kevin Gregg as a free agent. Selected Kameron Loe off waivers from the Seattle Mariners.
- April 16, selected Cody Ransom off waivers from the San Diego Padres.
- April 19, released Jensen Lewis. Selected Julio Borbon off waivers from the Texas Rangers.

=== May ===
- May 6, released Cory Wade.
- May 9, sold Alberto Gonzalez to the New York Yankees.
- May 10, sent Drew Carpenter to the Colorado Rockies as part of a conditional deal. Kameron Loe granted free agency.
- May 21, selected Eduardo Sanchez off waivers from the St. Louis Cardinals.
- May 27, selected Alex Burnett off waivers from the Baltimore Orioles.

=== June ===
- June 6, drafted Kris Bryant in the 1st round (2nd pick) of the 2013 amateur draft. Player signed July 12, 2013. Drafted Rob Zastryzny in the 2nd round of the 2013 amateur draft. Player signed June 17, 2013.
- June 7, drafted Zack Godley in the 10th round of the 2013 amateur draft. Player signed June 13, 2013.
- June 11, traded Ian Dickson (minors) to the Washington Nationals. Received Henry Rodriguez.
- June 21, sold Brent Lillibridge to the New York Yankees.
- June 22, sold Hisanori Takahashi to the Colorado Rockies.
- June 25, released Ian Stewart.

=== July ===
- July 2, sold Ronald Torreyes to the Houston Astros. Traded Steve Clevenger and Scott Feldman to the Baltimore Orioles. Received Jake Arrieta, Pedro Strop and cash. Traded Carlos Marmol and cash to the Los Angeles Dodgers. Received Matt Guerrier.
- July 7, released Shawn Camp.
- July 8, traded Scott Hairston, cash and player to be named to the Washington Nationals. Received Ivan Pineyro (minors) and player to be named.
- July 10, signed Edgar Gonzalez as a free agent.
- July 13, selected Cole Gillespie off waivers from the San Francisco Giants.
- July 18, released Esmailin Caridad.
- July 22, traded Matt Garza to the Texas Rangers. Received a player to be named later, Carl Edwards Jr., Justin Grimm, and Mike Olt. The Texas Rangers sent Neil Ramirez (August 23, 2013) to the Chicago Cubs to complete the trade.
- July 26, sold Guillermo Moscoso to the San Francisco Giants. Traded Alfonso Soriano and cash to the New York Yankees. Received Corey Black (minors).

=== August ===
- August 5, selected Thomas Neal off waivers from the New York Yankees.
- August 19, sold David DeJesus to the Washington Nationals.
- August 23, released Dayan Diaz.

=== September ===
- September 4, selected Daniel Bard off waivers from the Boston Red Sox.
- September 16, released Cody Ransom.

=== October ===
- October 1, Michael Bowden and Eduardo Sanchez granted free agency.
- October 3, selected Mat Gamel off waivers from the Milwaukee Brewers.
- October 10, J.C. Boscan granted free agency.
- October 11, Thomas Neal granted free agency.
- October 15, Darnell McDonald granted free agency.
- October 31, Scott Baker, Kevin Gregg, Matt Guerrier, and Dioner Navarro granted free agency.

Source.

== Regular season ==
=== Opening Day starters ===
Monday, April 1, 2013 at Pittsburgh Pirates

| Name | Pos. |
|---|---|
| David DeJesus | CF |
| Starlin Castro | SS |
| Anthony Rizzo | 1B |
| Alfonso Soriano | LF |
| Nate Schierholtz | RF |
| Welington Castillo | C |
| Luis Valbuena | 3B |
| Brent Lillibridge | 2B |
| Jeff Samardzija | SP |

=== Season standings ===
==== NL Central standings ====
NL Central
| Team | W | L | Pct. | GB | Home | Road |
|---|---|---|---|---|---|---|
| St. Louis Cardinals | 97 | 65 | .599 | — | 54‍–‍27 | 43‍–‍38 |
| Pittsburgh Pirates | 94 | 68 | .580 | 3 | 50‍–‍31 | 44‍–‍37 |
| Cincinnati Reds | 90 | 72 | .556 | 7 | 49‍–‍31 | 41‍–‍41 |
| Milwaukee Brewers | 74 | 88 | .457 | 23 | 37‍–‍44 | 37‍–‍44 |
| Chicago Cubs | 66 | 96 | .407 | 31 | 31‍–‍50 | 35‍–‍46 |

==== NL Wild Card ====
Division winners
| Team | W | L | Pct. |
|---|---|---|---|
| St. Louis Cardinals | 97 | 65 | .599 |
| Atlanta Braves | 96 | 66 | .593 |
| Los Angeles Dodgers | 92 | 70 | .568 |

Wild Card teams (Top 2 teams qualify for postseason)
| Team | W | L | Pct. | GB |
|---|---|---|---|---|
| Pittsburgh Pirates | 94 | 68 | .580 | +4 |
| Cincinnati Reds | 90 | 72 | .556 | — |
| Washington Nationals | 86 | 76 | .531 | 4 |
| Arizona Diamondbacks | 81 | 81 | .500 | 9 |
| San Francisco Giants | 76 | 86 | .469 | 14 |
| San Diego Padres | 76 | 86 | .469 | 14 |
| Colorado Rockies | 74 | 88 | .457 | 16 |
| New York Mets | 74 | 88 | .457 | 16 |
| Milwaukee Brewers | 74 | 88 | .457 | 16 |
| Philadelphia Phillies | 73 | 89 | .451 | 17 |
| Chicago Cubs | 66 | 96 | .407 | 24 |
| Miami Marlins | 62 | 100 | .383 | 28 |

=== Record vs. opponents ===
2013 National League record Source: MLB Standings Grid – 2013
| Team | AZ | ATL | CHC | CIN | COL | LAD | MIA | MIL | NYM | PHI | PIT | SD | SF | STL | WSH | AL |
|---|---|---|---|---|---|---|---|---|---|---|---|---|---|---|---|---|
| Arizona | — | 2–4 | 4–3 | 3–4 | 12–7 | 10–9 | 4–2 | 6–1 | 3–4 | 3–4 | 3–3 | 7–12 | 7–12 | 4–3 | 2–4 | 11–9 |
| Atlanta | 4–2 | — | 5–1 | 4–3 | 6–1 | 5–2 | 13–6 | 2–4 | 10–9 | 11–8 | 4–3 | 1–5 | 3–4 | 4–3 | 13–6 | 11–9 |
| Chicago | 3–4 | 1–5 | — | 5–14 | 3–3 | 1–6 | 4–3 | 6–13 | 3–3 | 3–3 | 7–12 | 3–4 | 4–3 | 7–12 | 3–4 | 13–7 |
| Cincinnati | 4–3 | 3–4 | 14–5 | — | 2–4 | 4–3 | 6–1 | 10–9 | 4–2 | 4–2 | 8–11 | 3–3 | 6–1 | 8–11 | 3–4 | 11–9 |
| Colorado | 7–12 | 1–6 | 3–3 | 4–2 | — | 10–9 | 3–4 | 4–2 | 3–4 | 3–4 | 4–2 | 12–7 | 9–10 | 3–4 | 3–4 | 5–15 |
| Los Angeles | 9–10 | 2–5 | 6–1 | 3–4 | 9–10 | — | 5–2 | 4–2 | 5–1 | 5–2 | 4–2 | 11–8 | 8–11 | 4–3 | 5–1 | 12–8 |
| Miami | 2–4 | 6–13 | 3–4 | 1–6 | 4–3 | 2–5 | — | 1–5 | 11–8 | 7–12 | 2–4 | 3–4 | 4–3 | 2–4 | 5–14 | 9–11 |
| Milwaukee | 1–6 | 4–2 | 13–6 | 9–10 | 2–4 | 2–4 | 5–1 | — | 4–3 | 5–2 | 7–12 | 3–4 | 5–2 | 5–14 | 3–4 | 6–14 |
| New York | 4–3 | 9–10 | 3–3 | 2–4 | 4–3 | 1–5 | 8–11 | 3–4 | — | 10–9 | 2–5 | 4–3 | 4–2 | 2–5 | 7–12 | 11–9 |
| Philadelphia | 4–3 | 8–11 | 3–3 | 2–4 | 4–3 | 2–5 | 12–7 | 2–5 | 9–10 | — | 3–4 | 4–2 | 3–3 | 2–5 | 8–11 | 7–13 |
| Pittsburgh | 3–3 | 3–4 | 12–7 | 11–8 | 2–4 | 2–4 | 4–2 | 12–7 | 5–2 | 4–3 | — | 3–4 | 4–3 | 10–9 | 4–3 | 15–5 |
| San Diego | 12–7 | 5–1 | 4–3 | 3–3 | 7–12 | 8–11 | 4–3 | 4–3 | 3–4 | 2–4 | 4–3 | — | 8–11 | 2–4 | 2–5 | 8–12 |
| San Francisco | 12–7 | 4–3 | 3–4 | 1–6 | 10–9 | 11–8 | 3–4 | 2–5 | 2–4 | 3–3 | 3–4 | 11–8 | — | 2–4 | 3–3 | 6–14 |
| St. Louis | 3–4 | 3–4 | 12–7 | 11–8 | 4–3 | 3–4 | 4–2 | 14–5 | 5–2 | 5–2 | 9–10 | 4–2 | 4–2 | — | 6–0 | 10–10 |
| Washington | 4–2 | 6–13 | 4–3 | 4–3 | 4–3 | 1–5 | 14–5 | 4–3 | 12–7 | 11–8 | 3–4 | 5–2 | 3–3 | 0–6 | — | 11–9 |

=== Game log ===
2013 regular season game log: 66–96 (Home: 31–50; Away: 35–46)
April: 10–16 (Home: 4–6; Away: 6–10)

| # | Date | Opponent | Score | Win | Loss | Save | Attendance | Record | Streak |
|---|---|---|---|---|---|---|---|---|---|
| 1 | April 1 | @ Pirates | 3–1 | **Samardzija** (1–0) | Burnett (0–1) | **Fujikawa** (1) | 39,078 | 1–0 | W1 |
| 2 | April 3 | @ Pirates | 0–3 | Rodríguez (1–0) | **Jackson** (0–1) | Grilli (1) | 27,667 | 1–1 | L1 |
| 3 | April 4 | @ Pirates | 3–2 | **Wood** (1–0) | McDonald (0–1) | **Mármol** (1) | 11,634 | 2–1 | W1 |
| 4 | April 5 | @ Braves | 1–4 | Minor (1–0) | **Feldman** (0–1) | Kimbrel (2) | 33,443 | 2–2 | L1 |
| 5 | April 6 | @ Braves | 5–6 | O'Flaherty (1–0) | **Mármol** (0–1) | — | 38,498 | 2–3 | L2 |
| 6 | April 7 | @ Braves | 1–5 | Hudson (1–0) | **Samardzija** (1–1) | — | 45,800 | 2–4 | L3 |
| 7 | April 8 | Brewers | 4–7 | Estrada (1–0) | **Jackson** (0–2) | Jim Henderson (1) | 40,083 | 2–5 | L4 |
| 8 | April 9 | Brewers | 6–3 | **Mármol** (1–1) | Axford (0–2) | **Fujikawa** (2) | 30,065 | 3–5 | W1 |
| – | April 10 | Brewers | Postponed (rain). Makeup Date July 30. | | | | | | |
| 9 | April 11 | Giants | 6–7 | Vogelsong (1–1) | **Feldman** (0–2) | Romo (6) | 25,460 | 3–6 | L1 |
| 10 | April 12 | Giants | 4–3 | **Fujikawa** (1–0) | Romo (0–1) | — | 30,996 | 4–6 | W1 |
| 11 | April 13 | Giants | 2–3 | Bumgarner (3–0) | **Samardzija** (1–2) | Casilla (1) | 34,778 | 4–7 | L1 |
| 12 | April 14 | Giants | 7–10 (10) | Kontos (1–1) | **Camp** (0–1) | Romo (7) | 33,326 | 4–8 | L2 |
| 13 | April 16 | Rangers | 2–4 | Holland (1–1) | **Wood** (1–1) | Nathan (5) | 29,344 | 4–9 | L3 |
| – | April 17 | Rangers | Postponed (rain). Makeup Date May 6. | | | | | | |
| 14 | April 18 | Rangers | 6–2 | **Villanueva** (1–0) | Ogando (2–1) | — | 26,083 | 5–9 | W1 |
| 15 | April 19 | @ Brewers | 4–5 | Estrada (2–0) | **Samardzija** (1–3) | Henderson (3) | 28,346 | 5–10 | L1 |
| 16 | April 20 | @ Brewers | 1–5 | Burgos (1–0) | **Jackson** (0–3) | — | 42,230 | 5–11 | L2 |
| 17 | April 21 | @ Brewers | 2–4 | Peralta (1–1) | **Feldman** (0–3) | Henderson (4) | 37,123 | 5–12 | L3 |
| 18 | April 22 | @ Reds | 4–5 (13) | Simón (2–1) | **Bowden** (0–1) | — | 18,090 | 5–13 | L4 |
| 19 | April 23 | @ Reds | 4–2 (10) | **Mármol** (2–1) | Parra (0–1) | **Gregg** (1) | 24,021 | 6–13 | W1 |
| 20 | April 24 | @ Reds | 0–1 | Latos (1–0) | **Samardzija** (1–4) | Chapman (4) | 16,426 | 6–14 | L1 |
| 21 | April 25 | @ Marlins | 4–3 | **Camp** (1–1) | Cishek (1–3) | **Mármol** (2) | 19,817 | 7–14 | W1 |
| 22 | April 26 | @ Marlins | 4–2 | **Feldman** (1–3) | LeBlanc (0–4) | **Gregg** (2) | 16,017 | 8–14 | W2 |
| 23 | April 27 | @ Marlins | 3–2 | **Wood** (2–1) | Sanabia (2–3) | **Gregg** (3) | 27,519 | 9–14 | W3 |
| 24 | April 28 | @ Marlins | 4–6 | Nolasco (2-2) | **Villanueva** (1–1) | Cishek (3) | 19,817 | 9-15 | L1 |
| 25 | April 29 | Padres | 5–3 | **Bowden** (1–1) | Richard (0–3) | **Gregg** (4) | 32,169 | 10–15 | W1 |
| 26 | April 30 | Padres | 7–13 | Volquez (2–3) | **Jackson** (0–4) | — | 31,303 | 10–16 | L1 |

May: 13–14 (Home: 9–8; Away: 4–6)

| # | Date | Opponent | Score | Win | Loss | Save | Attendance | Record | Streak |
|---|---|---|---|---|---|---|---|---|---|
| 27 | May 1 | Padres | 6–2 | **Feldman** (2–3) | Cashner (1–2) | — | 34,832 | 11–16 | W1 |
| 28 | May 2 | Padres | 2–4 | Thatcher (2–0) | **Wood** (2–2) | Street (6) | 32,865 | 11–17 | L1 |
| 29 | May 3 | Reds | 5–6 | Leake (2–1) | **Villanueva** (1–2) | Hoover (1) | 32,579 | 11–18 | L2 |
| 30 | May 4 | Reds | 4–6 | Ondrusek (2–0) | **Mármol** (2–2) | Chapman (7) | 36,455 | 11–19 | L3 |
| 31 | May 5 | Reds | 4–7 | Latos (3–0) | **Jackson** (0–5) | Hoover (2) | 33,449 | 11–20 | L4 |
| 32 | May 6 | Rangers | 9–2 | **Feldman** (3–3) | Tepesch (2–3) | — | 32,618 | 12–20 | W1 |
| 33 | May 7 | Cardinals | 2–1 | **Wood** (3–2) | Lynn (5–1) | **Gregg** (5) | 30,161 | 13–20 | W2 |
| 34 | May 8 | Cardinals | 4–5 | Maness (2–0) | **Bowden** (1–2) | Mujica (9) | 26,354 | 13–21 | L1 |
| 35 | May 10 | @ Nationals | 3–7 | Detwiler (2–3) | **Samardjiza** (1–5) | — | 37,191 | 13–22 | L2 |
| 36 | May 11 | @ Nationals | 8–2 | **Jackson** (1–5) | Strasburg (1–5) | — | 37,116 | 14–22 | W1 |
| 37 | May 12 | @ Nationals | 2–1 | **Russell** (1–0) | Soriano (0–1) | **Gregg** (6) | 38,788 | 15–22 | W2 |
| 38 | May 13 | Rockies | 9–1 | **Wood** (4–2) | Nicasio (3–1) | — | 35,080 | 16–22 | W3 |
| 39 | May 14 | Rockies | 4–9 | Francis (2–3) | **Villanueva** (1–3) | — | 38,123 | 16–23 | L1 |
| 40 | May 15 | Rockies | 6–3 | **Samardjiza** (2–5) | Garland (3–4) | — | 38,083 | 17–23 | W1 |
| 41 | May 17 | Mets | 2–3 | Harvey (5–0) | **Jackson** (1–6) | Parnell (5) | 34,890 | 17–24 | L1 |
| 42 | May 18 | Mets | 8–2 | **Feldman** (4–3) | Hefner (0–5) | — | 38,766 | 18–24 | W1 |
| 43 | May 19 | Mets | 3–4 | Rice (2–3) | **Fujikawa** (1–1) | Parnell (6) | 34,258 | 18–25 | L1 |
| 44 | May 21 | @ Pirates | 4–5 | Rodríguez (5–2) | **Russell** (1–1) | Grilli (18) | 16,092 | 18–26 | L2 |
| 45 | May 22 | @ Pirates | 0–1 | Liriano (3–0) | **Samardjiza** (2–6) | Melancon (1) | 12,675 | 18–27 | L3 |
| 46 | May 23 | @ Pirates | 2–4 | Mazzaro (3–0) | **Jackson** (1–7) | Grilli (19) | 24,552 | 18–28 | L4 |
| 47 | May 24 | @ Reds | 4–7 | Arroyo (5–4) | **Feldman** (4–4) | Chapman (11) | 40,716 | 18–29 | L5 |
| 48 | May 25 | @ Reds | 2–5 | Bailey (3–3) | **Wood** (4–3) | Chapman (12) | 40,909 | 18–30 | L6 |
| 49 | May 26 | @ Reds | 5–4 | **Gregg** (1–0) | Hoover (0–4) | — | 41,321 | 19–30 | W1 |
| 50 | May 27 | @ White Sox | 7–0 | **Samardjiza** (3–6) | Quintana (3–2) | — | 30,631 | 20-30 | W2 |
| - | May 28 | @ White Sox | Postponed (rain). Makeup Date July 8. | | | | | | |
| 51 | May 29 | White Sox | 9–3 | **Feldman** (5–4) | Danks (0–1) | — | 31,279 | 21–30 | W3 |
| 52 | May 30 | White Sox | 8–3 | **Wood** (5–3) | Peavy (6–3) | — | 31,968 | 22–30 | W4 |
| 53 | May 31 | D-backs | 7–2 | **Garza** (1–0) | Miley (3–5) | — | 24,645 | 23–30 | W5 |

June: 12–15 (Home: 4–8; Away: 8–7)

| # | Date | Opponent | Score | Win | Loss | Save | Attendance | Record | Streak |
|---|---|---|---|---|---|---|---|---|---|
| 54 | June 1 | D-backs | 4–12 | Kennedy (3–3) | **Mármol** (2–3) | — | 31,465 | 23–31 | L1 |
| 55 | June 2 | D-backs | 4–8 | Corbin (9–0) | **Jackson** (1–8) | — | 29,667 | 23–32 | L2 |
| 56 | June 4 | @ Angels | 3–4 | Coello (2–1) | **Villanueva** (1–4) | Frieri (13) | 32,223 | 23–33 | L3 |
| 57 | June 5 | @ Angels | 8–6 | **Gregg** (2–0) | Coello (2–2) | — | 30,171 | 24–33 | W1 |
| 58 | June 7 | Pirates | 0–2 | Liriano (4–2) | **Wood** (5–4) | Grilli (23) | 31,614 | 24–34 | L1 |
| 59 | June 8 | Pirates | 2–6 | Burnett (4–6) | **Samardzija** (3–7) | — | 38,405 | 24–35 | L2 |
| 60 | June 9 | Pirates | 4–1 | **Jackson** (2–8) | Wilson (5–1) | **Gregg** (7) | 31,858 | 25–35 | W1 |
| 61 | June 10 | Reds | 2–6 | Bailey (4–4) | **Feldman** (5–5) | — | 28,052 | 25–36 | L1 |
| 62 | June 11 | Reds | 2–12 | Cingrani (3–0) | **Garza** (1–1) | — | 30,937 | 25–37 | L2 |
| 63 | June 12 | Reds | 1–2 | Leake (6–3) | **Wood** (5–5) | Chapman (17) | 24,749 | 25–38 | L3 |
| 64 | June 13 | Reds | 6–5 (14) | **Rondon** (1–0) | Broxton (2–2) | — | 28,986 | 26–38 | W1 |
| 65 | June 14 | @ Mets | 6–3 | **Jackson** (3–8) | Marcum (0–8) | **Gregg** (8) | 32,208 | 27–38 | W2 |
| 66 | June 15 | @ Mets | 5–2 | **Feldman** (6–5) | Niese (3–6) | **Gregg** (9) | 27,004 | 28–38 | W3 |
| 67 | June 16 | @ Mets | 3–4 | Parnell (5–3) | **Mármol** (2–4) | — | 30,256 | 28–39 | L1 |
| 68 | June 17 | @ Cardinals | 2–5 | Miller (8–4) | **Wood** (5–6) | Mujica (20) | 44,172 | 28–40 | L2 |
| 69 | June 18 | @ Cardinals | 4–2 | **Samardzija** (4–7) | Wainwright (10–4) | **Gregg** (10) | 44,139 | 29–40 | W1 |
| 70 | June 19 | @ Cardinals | 1–4 | Westbrook (3–2) | **Jackson** (3–9) | Mujica (21) | 43,878 | 29–41 | L1 |
| 71 | June 20 | @ Cardinals | 1–6 | Lynn (10–1) | **Feldman** (6–6) | — | 43,651 | 29–42 | L2 |
| 72 | June 21 | Astros | 3–1 | **Garza** (2–1) | Keuchel (4–4) | **Gregg** (11) | 33,119 | 30–42 | W1 |
| 73 | June 22 | Astros | 3–4 | Cisnero (2–0) | **Gregg** (2–1) | Veras (15) | 38,870 | 30–43 | L1 |
| 74 | June 23 | Astros | 14–6 | **Samardzija** (5–7) | Lyles (4–2) | — | 35,121 | 31–43 | W1 |
| 75 | June 25 | @ Brewers | 3–9 | Lohse (3–6) | **Jackson** (3–10) | — | 30,172 | 31–44 | L1 |
| 76 | June 26 | @ Brewers | 5–4 | **Feldman** (7–6) | Gallardo (6–7) | **Gregg** (12) | 28,061 | 32–44 | W1 |
| 77 | June 27 | @ Brewers | 7–2 | **Garza** (3–1) | Peralta (5–9) | — | 31,792 | 33–44 | W2 |
| 78 | June 28 | @ Mariners | 4–5 (10) | Medina (3–2) | **Parker** (0–1) | — | 31,471 | 33–45 | L1 |
| 79 | June 29 | @ Mariners | 5–3 (11) | **Villanueva** (2–4) | Pérez (2–2) | **Parker** (1) | 34,630 | 34–45 | W1 |
| 80 | June 30 | @ Mariners | 7–6 | **Jackson** (4–10) | Bonderman (1–2) | **Gregg** (13) | 24,701 | 35–45 | W2 |

July: 14–13 (Home: 6–7; Away: 8–6)

| # | Date | Opponent | Score | Win | Loss | Save | Attendance | Record | Streak |
|---|---|---|---|---|---|---|---|---|---|
| 81 | July 2 | @ Athletics | 7–8 | Otero (1–0) | **Russell** (1–2) | Balfour (20) | 17,273 | 35–46 | L1 |
| 82 | July 3 | @ Athletics | 3–1 | **Garza** (4–1) | Colón (11–3) | **Gregg** (14) | 35,067 | 36–46 | W1 |
| 83 | July 4 | @ Athletics | 0–1 | Straily (5–1) | **Guerrier** (2–4) | Balfour (21) | 26,967 | 36–47 | L1 |
| 84 | July 5 | Pirates | 2–6 | Liriano (8–3) | **Samardzija** (5–8) | — | 38,615 | 36–48 | L2 |
| 85 | July 6 | Pirates | 4–1 | **Jackson** (5–10) | Morton (1–2) | **Gregg** (15) | 36,590 | 37–48 | W1 |
| 86 | July 7 | Pirates | 4–3 | **Guerrier** (3–4) | Morris (4–3) | — | 33,146 | 38–48 | W2 |
| 87 | July 8 | @ White Sox | 8–2 | **Garza** (5–1) | Thornton (0–3) | — | 31,552 | 39–48 | W3 |
| 88 | July 9 | Angels | 7–2 | **Wood** (6–6) | Blanton (2–11) | — | 31,579 | 40–48 | W4 |
| 89 | July 10 | Angels | 2–13 | Wilson (9–6) | **Samardzija** (5–9) | — | 31,111 | 40–49 | L1 |
| 90 | July 11 | Cardinals | 3–0 | **Jackson** (6–10) | Westbrook (5–4) | **Gregg** (16) | 35,379 | 41–49 | W1 |
| 91 | July 12 | Cardinals | 2–3 | Kelly (1–3) | **Villanueva** (2–5) | Mujica (26) | 37,322 | 41–50 | L2 |
| 92 | July 13 | Cardinals | 6–4 | **Garza** (6–1) | Lynn (11–4) | **Gregg** (17) | 42,240 | 42–50 | W1 |
| 93 | July 14 | Cardinals | 6–10 | Mujica (2–1) | **Gregg** (2–2) | — | 35,178 | 42–51 | L1 |
| 94 | July 19 | @ Rockies | 3–1 | **Samardzija** (6–9) | Escalona (1–3) | **Gregg** (18) | 42,976 | 43–51 | W1 |
| 95 | July 20 | @ Rockies | 3–9 | Nicasio (6–4) | **Villanueva** (2–6) | — | 45,616 | 43–52 | L1 |
| 96 | July 21 | @ Rockies | 3–4 | Chatwood (6–3) | **Jackson** (6–11) | Brothers (5) | 43,108 | 43–53 | L2 |
| 97 | July 22 | @ D-backs | 4–2 | **Rusin** (1–0) | Skaggs (2–2) | **Gregg** (19) | 21,288 | 44–53 | W1 |
| 98 | July 23 | @ D-backs | 4–10 | Corbin (12–1) | **Wood** (6–7) | — | 21,278 | 44–54 | L1 |
| 99 | July 24 | @ D-backs | 7–6 (12) | **Rondon** (2–0) | Hernandez (4–6) | — | 21,141 | 45–54 | W1 |
| 100 | July 25 | @ D-backs | 1–3 | Miley (7–8) | **Villanueva** (2–7) | Ziegler (5) | 23,341 | 45–55 | L1 |
| 101 | July 26 | @ Giants | 3–2 | **Guerrier** (4–4) | Romo (3–5) | **Gregg** (20) | 41,797 | 46–55 | W1 |
| 102 | July 27 | @ Giants | 1–0 | **Strop** (1–3) | Romo (3–6) | **Gregg** (21) | 30,033 | 47–55 | W2 |
| 103 | July 28 | @ Giants | 2–1 | **Wood** (7–7) | Lincecum (5–11) | **Gregg** (22) | 41,608 | 48–55 | W3 |
| 104 | July 29 | Brewers | 0–5 | Kintzler (3–0) | **Strop** (1–4) | — | 32,848 | 48–56 | L1 |
| 105 | July 30 | Brewers | 5–6 | Wooten (1–0) | **Russell** (1–3) | Henderson (13) | 34,996 | 48–57 | L2 |
| 106 | July 30 | Brewers | 2–3 | Badenhop (2–3) | **Gregg** (2–3) | Henderson (14) | 31,638 | 48–58 | L3 |
| 107 | July 31 | Brewers | 6–1 | **Jackson** (7–11) | Peralta (7–11) | | 29,817 | 49–58 | W1 |

August: 8–20 (Home: 3–13; Away: 5–7)

| # | Date | Opponent | Score | Win | Loss | Save | Attendance | Record | Streak |
|---|---|---|---|---|---|---|---|---|---|
| 108 | August 1 | Dodgers | 4–6 | Nolasco (7–9) | **Rusin** (1–1) | Jansen (15) | 34,005 | 49–59 | L1 |
| 109 | August 2 | Dodgers | 2–6 | Ryu (10–3) | **Wood** (7–8) | — | 32,520 | 49–60 | L2 |
| 110 | August 3 | Dodgers | 0–3 | Capuano (4–6) | **Samardzija** (6–10) | Jansen (16) | 40,490 | 49–61 | L3 |
| 111 | August 4 | Dodgers | 0–1 | Fife (4–3) | **Villanueva** (2–8) | Jansen (17) | 38,409 | 49–62 | L4 |
| 112 | August 6 | @ Phillies | 8–9 | Kendrick (10–8) | **Jackson** (7–12) | | 36,841 | 49–63 | L5 |
| 113 | August 7 | @ Phillies | 5–2 | **Strop** (2–4) | García (0–1) | **Gregg** (23) | 36,171 | 50–63 | W1 |
| 114 | August 8 | @ Phillies | 1–12 | Martin (1–1) | **Samardzija** (6–11) | — | 42,510 | 50–64 | L1 |
| 115 | August 9 | @ Cardinals | 3–0 | **Rusin** (2–1) | Lynn (13–6) | **Gregg** (24) | 42,664 | 51–64 | W1 |
| 116 | August 10 | @ Cardinals | 6–5 | **Parker** (1–1) | Rosenthal (1–3) | **Gregg** (25) | 43,908 | 52–64 | W2 |
| 117 | August 11 | @ Cardinals | 4–8 | Choate (2–1) | **Parker** (1–2) | Mujica (31) | 43,240 | 52–65 | L1 |
| 118 | August 12 | Reds | 0–2 | Latos (12–3) | **Wood** (7–9) | Chapman (28) | 33,277 | 52–66 | L2 |
| 119 | August 13 | Reds | 4–6 (11) | Hoover (3–5) | **Sanchez** (0–1) | Chapman (29) | 33,286 | 52–67 | L3 |
| 120 | August 14 | Reds | 0–5 | Arroyo (11–9) | **Rusin** (2–2) | — | 33,642 | 52–68 | L4 |
| 121 | August 16 | Cardinals | 7–0 | **Arrieta** (2–2) | Westbrook (7–8) | — | 35,258 | 53–68 | W1 |
| 122 | August 17 | Cardinals | 0–4 | Kelly (4–3) | **Wood** (7–10) | — | 41,981 | 53–69 | L1 |
| 123 | August 18 | Cardinals | 1–6 | Wainwright (14–7) | **Jackson** (7–13) | — | 33,830 | 53–70 | L2 |
| 124 | August 19 | Nationals | 11–1 | **Samardzija** (7–11) | Zimmermann (14–7) | — | 31,290 | 54–70 | W1 |
| 125 | August 20 | Nationals | 2–4 | Haren (8–11) | **Rusin** (2–3) | Soriano (32) | 30,975 | 54–71 | L1 |
| 126 | August 21 | Nationals | 6–11 | Roark (3–0) | **Russell** (1–4) | — | 31,936 | 54–72 | L2 |
| 127 | August 22 | Nationals | 4–5 (13) | Stammen (7–5) | **Bowden** (1–3) | Storen (3) | 29,393 | 54–73 | L3 |
| 128 | August 23 | @ Padres | 6–8 | Vincent (3–1) | **Russell** (1–5) | Street (25) | 23,561 | 54–74 | L4 |
| 129 | August 24 | @ Padres | 3–2 | **Samardzija** (8–11) | Stults (8–11) | **Gregg** (26) | 30,870 | 55–74 | W1 |
| 130 | August 25 | @ Padres | 2–3 (15) | Thayer (2–3) | **Rondon** (2–1) | — | 22,762 | 55–75 | L1 |
| 131 | August 26 | @ Dodgers | 2–6 | Greinke (13–3) | **Arrieta** (2–3) | — | 40,965 | 55–76 | L2 |
| 132 | August 27 | @ Dodgers | 3–2 | **Wood** (8–10) | Kershaw (13–8) | **Gregg** (27) | 52,326 | 56–76 | W1 |
| 133 | August 28 | @ Dodgers | 0–4 | Nolasco (11–9) | **Jackson** (7–14) | — | 38,851 | 56–77 | L1 |
| 134 | August 30 | Phillies | 5–6 | Rosenberg (1–0) | **Gregg** (2–4) | Papelbon (23) | 27,763 | 56–78 | L2 |
| 135 | August 31 | Phillies | 4–3 | **Villanueva** (3–8) | Miner (0–1) | **Gregg** (28) | 36,410 | 57–78 | W1 |

September: 9–18 (Home: 5–8; Away: 4–10)

| # | Date | Opponent | Score | Win | Loss | Save | Attendance | Record | Streak |
|---|---|---|---|---|---|---|---|---|---|
| 136 | September 1 | Phillies | 7–1 | **Arrieta** (3–3) | Kendrick (10–12) | — | 31,859 | 58–78 | W1 |
| 137 | September 2 | Marlins | 3–4 | Álvarez (3–3) | **Wood** (8–11) | Cishek (29) | 26,978 | 58–79 | L1 |
| 138 | September 3 | Marlins | 2–6 | Webb (2–5) | **Jackson** (7–15) | — | 30,024 | 58–80 | L2 |
| 139 | September 4 | Marlins | 9–7 | **Villanueva** (4–8) | Webb (2–6) | **Gregg** (29) | 20,696 | 59–80 | W1 |
| 140 | September 6 | Brewers | 8–5 | **Villanueva** (5–8) | Lohse (9–9) | **Gregg** (30) | 35,351 | 60–80 | W2 |
| 141 | September 7 | Brewers | 3–5 | Hellweg (1–3) | **Arrieta** (3–4) | Henderson (23) | 34,929 | 60–81 | L1 |
| 142 | September 8 | Brewers | 1–3 | Gallardo (11–9) | **Grimm** (7–8) | Henderson (24) | 27,802 | 60–82 | L2 |
| 143 | September 9 | @ Reds | 2–0 | **Wood** (9–11) | Arroyo (13–11) | **Gregg** (31) | 22,920 | 61–82 | W1 |
| 144 | September 10 | @ Reds | 9–1 | **Jackson** (8–15) | Cingrani (7–4) | — | 21,396 | 62–82 | W2 |
| 145 | September 11 | @ Reds | 0–6 | Leake (13–6) | **Samardzija** (8–12) | — | 22,088 | 62–83 | L1 |
| 146 | September 12 | @ Pirates | 1–3 | Locke (10–5) | **Rusin** (2–4) | Melancon (14) | 23,541 | 62–84 | L2 |
| 147 | September 13 | @ Pirates | 5–4 | **Villanueva** (6–8) | Grilli (0–2) | **Gregg** (32) | 35,962 | 63–84 | W1 |
| 148 | September 14 | @ Pirates | 1–2 | Cole (8–7) | **Russell** (1–6) | Melancon (15) | 37,534 | 63–85 | L1 |
| 149 | September 15 | @ Pirates | 2–3 | Farnsworth (3–0) | **Strop** (2–5) | Melancon (16) | 36,559 | 63–86 | L2 |
| 150 | September 16 | @ Brewers | 1–6 | Peralta (10–15) | **Jackson** (8–16) | — | 24,464 | 63–87 | L3 |
| 151 | September 17 | @ Brewers | 3–4 | Henderson (5–5) | **Grimm** (7–9) | — | 22,506 | 63–88 | L4 |
| 152 | September 18 | @ Brewers | 0–7 | Thornburg (3–1) | **Rusin** (2–5) | — | 24,632 | 63–89 | L5 |
| 153 | September 19 | @ Brewers | 5–1 | **Arrieta** (4–4) | Lohse (10–10) | — | 21,625 | 64–89 | W1 |
| 154 | September 20 | Braves | 5–9 | Carpenter (4–1) | **Gregg** (2–5) | — | 29,539 | 64–90 | L1 |
| 155 | September 21 | Braves | 3–1 | **Villanueva** (7–8) | Downs (4–4) | **Strop** (1) | 34,612 | 65–90 | W1 |
| 156 | September 22 | Braves | 2–5 | Teherán (13–8) | **Jackson** (8–17) | Kimbrel (49) | 30,515 | 65–91 | L1 |
| 157 | September 23 | Pirates | 1–2 | Melancon (3–2) | **Gregg** (2–6) | Grilli (32) | 32,289 | 65–92 | L2 |
| 158 | September 24 | Pirates | 2–8 | Cole (10–7) | **Rusin** (2–6) | — | 34,138 | 65–93 | L3 |
| 159 | September 25 | Pirates | 4–2 | **Arrieta** (5–4) | Liriano (16–8) | **Gregg** (33) | 26,171 | 66–93 | W1 |
| 160 | September 27 | @ Cardinals | 0–7 | Lynn (15–10) | **Wood** (9–12) | — | 44,030 | 66–94 | L1 |
| 161 | September 28 | @ Cardinals | 2–6 | Wainwright (19–9) | **Jackson** (8–18) | Maness (1) | 42,520 | 66–95 | L2 |
| 162 | September 29 | @ Cardinals | 0–4 | Kelly (10–5) | **Samardzija** (8–13) | — | 44,808 | 66–96 | L3 |

Legend: = Win = Loss = Postponement
Bold = Cubs team member

=== Roster ===
2013 Chicago Cubs
**Roster**
| **Pitchers**: 49 Jake Arrieta; 32 Scott Baker; 28 Michael Bowden; 50 Alex Burnett; 55 Alberto Cabrera; 54 Shawn Camp; 48 Rafael Dolis; 46 Scott Feldman; 11 Kyuji Fujikawa; 22 Matt Garza; 63 Kevin Gregg; 52 Justin Grimm; 51 Matt Guerrier; 36 Edwin Jackson; 12 Chang-Yong Lim; 50 Kameron Loe; 49 Carlos Mármol; 50 Blake Parker; 57 Zach Putnam; 43 Brooks Raley; 62 Henry Rodríguez; 56 Héctor Rondón; 59 Zach Rosscup; 18 Chris Rusin; 40 James Russell; 29 Jeff Samardzija; 52 Eduardo Sánchez; 46 Pedro Strop; 47 Hisanori Takahashi; 33 Carlos Villanueva; 37 Travis Wood | **Catchers**: 7 J. C. Boscán; 53 Welington Castillo; 30 Dioner Navarro; **Infielders**: 15 Darwin Barney; 13 Starlin Castro; 51 Steve Clevenger; 6,8 Alberto González; 20 Brent Lillibridge; 8 Donnie Murphy; 1 Cody Ransom; 44 Anthony Rizzo; 24 Luis Valbuena; 22 Logan Watkins | **Outfielders**: 47 Brian Bogusevic; 20 Julio Borbón; 9 David DeJesus; 2 Cole Gillespie; 21 Scott Hairston; 21 Junior Lake; 16,54 Darnell McDonald; 54 Thomas Neal; 17 Dave Sappelt; 19 Nate Schierholtz; 12 Alfonso Soriano; 6 Ryan Sweeney | **Manager**: 33 Dale Sveum; **Coaching Staff**: 3 David Bell (third base); 95 Andrew Lane (bullpen catcher); 39 Dave McKay (first base); 38 James Rowson (hitting); 8 Jamie Quirk (bench); 25 Chris Bosio (pitching); 35 Lester Strode (bullpen); 45 Rob Deer (assistant hitting) |

== Statistics ==
=== Batting ===
Note: G = Games played; AB = At bats; R = Runs scored; H = Hits; 2B = Doubles; 3B = Triples; HR = Home runs; Avg. = Batting average; RBI = Runs batted in; SB = Stolen bases

| Player | G | AB | R | H | 2B | 3B | HR | RBI | AVG | SB |
|---|---|---|---|---|---|---|---|---|---|---|
| Darwin Barney | 141 | 501 | 49 | 104 | 25 | 1 | 7 | 41 | .208 | 4 |
| Brian Bogusevic | 47 | 143 | 18 | 39 | 7 | 1 | 6 | 16 | .273 | 2 |
| Julio Borbon | 72 | 104 | 10 | 21 | 3 | 1 | 1 | 3 | .202 | 7 |
| J. C. Boscán | 6 | 9 | 1 | 2 | 1 | 0 | 0 | 0 | .222 | 0 |
| Welington Castillo | 113 | 380 | 41 | 103 | 23 | 0 | 8 | 32 | .271 | 2 |
| Starlin Castro | 161 | 666 | 59 | 163 | 34 | 2 | 10 | 44 | .245 | 9 |
| Steve Clevenger | 8 | 8 | 1 | 1 | 0 | 0 | 0 | 0 | .125 | 0 |
| David DeJesus | 84 | 284 | 39 | 71 | 19 | 3 | 6 | 27 | .250 | 3 |
| Cole Gillespie | 25 | 50 | 6 | 12 | 2 | 0 | 0 | 4 | .240 | 0 |
| Alberto González | 11 | 23 | 3 | 5 | 1 | 0 | 1 | 2 | .217 | 0 |
| Scott Hairston | 52 | 99 | 13 | 17 | 2 | 0 | 8 | 19 | .172 | 2 |
| Junior Lake | 64 | 236 | 26 | 67 | 16 | 0 | 6 | 16 | .284 | 4 |
| Brent Lillibridge | 9 | 24 | 0 | 1 | 0 | 0 | 0 | 2 | .042 | 0 |
| Darnell McDonald | 25 | 53 | 4 | 16 | 4 | 0 | 1 | 5 | .302 | 0 |
| Donnie Murphy | 46 | 149 | 23 | 38 | 8 | 0 | 11 | 23 | .255 | 2 |
| Dioner Navarro | 89 | 240 | 31 | 72 | 7 | 0 | 13 | 34 | .300 | 0 |
| Thomas Neal | 2 | 4 | 0 | 0 | 0 | 0 | 0 | 0 | .000 | 0 |
| Cody Ransom | 57 | 158 | 21 | 32 | 10 | 1 | 9 | 20 | .203 | 0 |
| Anthony Rizzo | 160 | 606 | 71 | 141 | 40 | 2 | 23 | 80 | .233 | 6 |
| Dave Sappelt | 31 | 75 | 6 | 18 | 3 | 0 | 0 | 4 | .240 | 3 |
| Nate Schierholtz | 137 | 462 | 56 | 116 | 32 | 3 | 21 | 68 | .251 | 6 |
| Alfonso Soriano | 93 | 362 | 47 | 92 | 24 | 1 | 17 | 51 | .254 | 10 |
| Ryan Sweeney | 70 | 192 | 19 | 51 | 13 | 2 | 6 | 19 | .266 | 1 |
| Luis Valbuena | 108 | 331 | 34 | 72 | 15 | 1 | 12 | 37 | .218 | 1 |
| Logan Watkins | 27 | 38 | 2 | 8 | 1 | 0 | 0 | 0 | .211 | 0 |
| Jake Arrieta | 9 | 15 | 0 | 2 | 0 | 0 | 0 | 2 | .133 | 0 |
| Scott Baker | 3 | 3 | 0 | 0 | 0 | 0 | 0 | 0 | .000 | 0 |
| Scott Feldman | 15 | 34 | 2 | 6 | 2 | 0 | 1 | 8 | .176 | 0 |
| Matt Garza | 8 | 18 | 1 | 4 | 1 | 0 | 0 | 2 | .222 | 0 |
| Edwin Jackson | 30 | 52 | 4 | 4 | 1 | 0 | 1 | 4 | .077 | 0 |
| Brooks Raley | 9 | 3 | 0 | 0 | 0 | 0 | 0 | 0 | .000 | 0 |
| Chris Rusin | 12 | 19 | 1 | 2 | 0 | 0 | 0 | 2 | .105 | 0 |
| Jeff Samardzija | 31 | 62 | 4 | 7 | 2 | 0 | 1 | 2 | .113 | 0 |
| Carlos Villenueva | 43 | 32 | 2 | 5 | 0 | 0 | 0 | 1 | .156 | 0 |
| Travis Wood | 35 | 63 | 8 | 14 | 1 | 0 | 3 | 8 | .222 | 1 |
| Team totals | 162 | 5498 | 602 | 1307 | 297 | 18 | 172 | 576 | .238 | 63 |

=== Pitching ===
Note: W = Wins; L = Losses; ERA = Earned run average; G = Games pitched; GS = Games started; SV = Saves; IP = Innings pitched; H = Hits allowed; R = Runs allowed; ER = Earned runs allowed; BB = Walks allowed; K = Strikeouts

| Player | W | L | ERA | G | GS | SV | IP | H | R | ER | BB | K |
|---|---|---|---|---|---|---|---|---|---|---|---|---|
| Jake Arrieta | 4 | 2 | 3.66 | 9 | 9 | 0 | 51.2 | 34 | 22 | 21 | 24 | 37 |
| Scott Baker | 0 | 0 | 3.60 | 3 | 3 | 0 | 15.0 | 9 | 6 | 6 | 4 | 6 |
| Scott Feldman | 7 | 6 | 3.46 | 15 | 15 | 0 | 91.0 | 79 | 42 | 35 | 25 | 67 |
| Matt Garza | 6 | 1 | 3.17 | 11 | 11 | 0 | 71.0 | 61 | 26 | 25 | 20 | 62 |
| Edwin Jackson | 8 | 18 | 4.98 | 31 | 31 | 0 | 175.1 | 197 | 110 | 97 | 59 | 135 |
| Chris Rusin | 2 | 6 | 3.93 | 13 | 13 | 0 | 66.1 | 66 | 30 | 29 | 24 | 36 |
| Jeff Samardzija | 8 | 13 | 4.34 | 33 | 33 | 0 | 213.2 | 210 | 109 | 103 | 78 | 214 |
| Travis Wood | 9 | 12 | 3.11 | 32 | 32 | 0 | 200.0 | 163 | 73 | 69 | 66 | 144 |
| Michael Bowden | 1 | 3 | 4.30 | 34 | 0 | 0 | 37.2 | 32 | 18 | 18 | 15 | 23 |
| Alex Burnett | 0 | 0 | 0.00 | 1 | 0 | 0 | 1.0 | 1 | 0 | 0 | 0 | 0 |
| Alberto Cabrera | 0 | 0 | 4.50 | 7 | 0 | 0 | 6.0 | 7 | 3 | 3 | 5 | 4 |
| Shawn Camp | 1 | 1 | 7.04 | 26 | 0 | 0 | 23.0 | 34 | 18 | 18 | 9 | 13 |
| Rafael Dolis | 0 | 0 | 0.00 | 5 | 0 | 0 | 5.0 | 3 | 2 | 0 | 0 | 2 |
| Kyuji Fujikawa | 1 | 1 | 5.25 | 12 | 0 | 2 | 12.0 | 11 | 7 | 7 | 2 | 14 |
| Kevin Gregg | 2 | 6 | 3.48 | 62 | 0 | 33 | 62.0 | 53 | 26 | 24 | 32 | 56 |
| Justin Grimm | 0 | 2 | 2.00 | 10 | 0 | 0 | 9.0 | 4 | 3 | 2 | 3 | 8 |
| Matt Guerrier | 2 | 1 | 2.13 | 15 | 0 | 0 | 12.2 | 11 | 4 | 3 | 5 | 9 |
| Chang-Yong Lim | 0 | 0 | 5.40 | 6 | 0 | 0 | 5.0 | 6 | 3 | 3 | 7 | 5 |
| Kameron Loe | 0 | 0 | 5.40 | 7 | 0 | 0 | 8.1 | 12 | 5 | 5 | 4 | 4 |
| Carlos Mármol | 2 | 4 | 5.86 | 31 | 0 | 2 | 27.2 | 26 | 19 | 18 | 21 | 32 |
| Blake Parker | 1 | 2 | 2.72 | 49 | 0 | 1 | 46.1 | 39 | 17 | 14 | 15 | 55 |
| Zach Putnam | 0 | 0 | 18.90 | 5 | 0 | 0 | 3.1 | 9 | 7 | 7 | 0 | 4 |
| Brooks Raley | 0 | 0 | 5.14 | 9 | 0 | 0 | 14.0 | 11 | 9 | 8 | 8 | 14 |
| Henry Rodriguez | 0 | 0 | 4.50 | 5 | 0 | 0 | 4.0 | 6 | 4 | 2 | 4 | 1 |
| Hector Rondon | 2 | 1 | 4.77 | 45 | 0 | 0 | 54.2 | 52 | 29 | 29 | 25 | 44 |
| Zach Rosscup | 0 | 0 | 1.35 | 10 | 0 | 0 | 6.2 | 3 | 1 | 1 | 7 | 7 |
| James Russell | 1 | 6 | 3.59 | 74 | 0 | 0 | 52.2 | 46 | 21 | 21 | 18 | 37 |
| Eduardo Sanchez | 0 | 1 | 5.68 | 4 | 0 | 0 | 6.1 | 5 | 4 | 4 | 5 | 5 |
| Pedro Strop | 2 | 2 | 2.83 | 37 | 0 | 1 | 35.0 | 22 | 11 | 11 | 11 | 42 |
| Hisanori Takahashi | 0 | 0 | 6.00 | 3 | 0 | 0 | 3.0 | 3 | 2 | 2 | 2 | 3 |
| Carlos Villenueva | 7 | 8 | 4.06 | 47 | 15 | 0 | 128.2 | 117 | 58 | 58 | 40 | 103 |
| Team totals | 66 | 96 | 4.00 | 162 | 162 | 39 | 1448.0 | 1332 | 689 | 643 | 540 | 1184 |

== Farm system ==
| Level | Team | League | Manager |
|---|---|---|---|
| AAA | Iowa Cubs | Pacific Coast League | Marty Pevey |
| AA | Tennessee Smokies | Southern League | Buddy Bailey |
| A | Daytona Cubs | Florida State League | Dave Keller |
| A | Kane County Cougars | Midwest League | Mark Johnson |
| A-Short Season | Boise Hawks | Northwest League | Gary Van Tol |
| Rookie | AZL Cubs | Arizona League | Bobby Mitchell |
