= Curtis Partch =

American baseball player (born 1987)

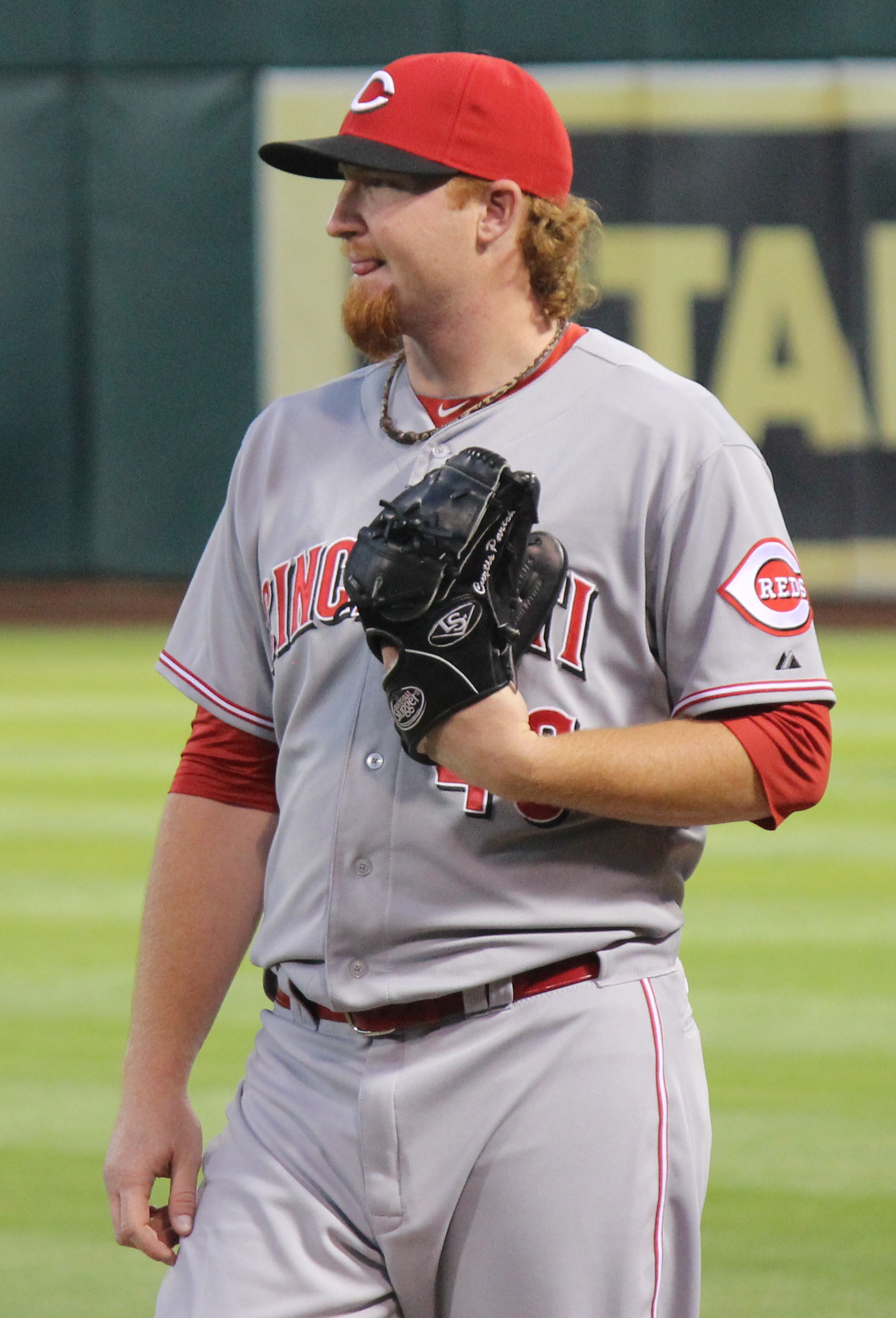
- Partch with the Cincinnati Reds
- Pitcher
- Born: February 13, 1987 (age 39); Merced, California, U.S.
- Batted: Right Threw: Right

MLB debut
- June 9, 2013, for the Cincinnati Reds

Last MLB appearance
- August 7, 2016, for the Pittsburgh Pirates

MLB statistics
- Win–loss record: 1–1
- Earned run average: 5.52
- Strikeouts: 22
- Stats at Baseball Reference

Teams
- Cincinnati Reds (2013–2014); Pittsburgh Pirates (2016)

Curtis Partch (born February 13, 1987) is an American former professional baseball pitcher. He played in Major League Baseball (MLB) for the Cincinnati Reds and Pittsburgh Pirates.

== Career ==
Partch attended Merced High School in Merced, California. He was selected in the 49th round of the 2005 MLB draft by the San Francisco Giants, but he did not sign.

=== Cincinnati Reds ===
The Cincinnati Reds drafted Partch in the 26th round, with the 799th overall selection, of the 2007 MLB draft from Merced College, where he did sign. Partch was assigned to the rookie-level Gulf Coast League Reds, where he pitched in 5 games before being promoted to the advanced-rookie Billings Mustangs. In 17 games that year (including 1 start), Partch went 1–0 with a 2.88 ERA and 3 saves, while striking out 26 across 34 1/3 innings pitched.

Partch played the 2008 campaign with the Dayton Dragons of the Single-A Midwest League, where in 33 games (17 starts), Partch went 5–11 with a 5.00 ERA and 1 save, striking out 74 in 111 2/3 innings. Partch began 2009 with Dayton, before being promoted to Sarasota Reds of the High-A Florida State League in August. He also pitched in one game for the Carolina Mudcats of the Double-A Southern League. In 27 starts that year, Partch went 12–9 with a 4.49 ERA and 104 strikeouts across 148 1/3 innings of work.

Partch spent the 2010 season with the Lynchburg Hillcats of the High-A Carolina League, while pitching one game for Carolina. In 29 total appearances (25 starts), Partch went 7–12 with a 5.33 ERA and 97 strikeouts in 135 innings. Partch began 2011 with the Bakersfield Blaze of the High-A California League, where he made 21 starts before being promoted to Carolina in August, where he finished the year. In 28 total starts, he went 8–13 with a 5.66 ERA and 126 strikeouts in 160 2/3 innings.

Partch played most of 2012 with the Double-A Pensacola Blue Wahoos of the Southern League, although he had a 7-game stint with Bakersfield in late April. In 52 total appearances (4 starts), Partch went 7–4 with a 4.26 ERA and 8 saves, striking out 79 in 82 1/3 innings. After the season, Partch played with the Peoria Javelinas of the Arizona Fall League (AFL), and was elected to the AFL Rising Stars Game, along with fellow Reds outfielder Billy Hamilton. On November 19, 2012, the Reds added Partch to their 40-man roster to protect him from the Rule 5 draft.

Partch began 2013 with Pensacola until he was promoted to the Louisville Bats of the Triple-A International League in late April. On June 8, Partch was recalled by the Reds, replacing Logan Ondrusek on the active roster. The next day, Partch made his MLB debut in the 10th inning against the St. Louis Cardinals, giving up a grand slam to Matt Holliday, the first batter he faced. In 14 games during his rookie campaign, he struggled to a 6.17 ERA with 16 strikeouts across 23 1/3 innings pitched.

Partch made 6 scoreless appearances for the Reds in 2014, recording 6 strikeouts in 7 innings of work. On December 2, 2014, the Reds non-tendered Partch, making him a free agent.

=== San Francisco Giants ===
On December 16, 2014, Partch signed a minor league contract with the San Francisco Giants. He made 48 appearances for the Triple-A Sacramento River Cats in 2015, registering a 1–3 record and 3.53 ERA with 81 strikeouts across 63 2/3 innings pitched. Partch elected free agency following the season on November 6, 2015.

=== Pittsburgh Pirates ===
On November 26, 2015, Partch signed a minor league contract with the Pittsburgh Pirates. On June 4, 2016, the Pirates selected Partch's contract, adding him to the active roster. He was designated for assignment following the promotion of Chad Kuhl on June 26. Partch cleared waivers and was sent outright to the Triple-A Indianapolis Indians on July 3. On August 6, the Pirates selected Partch's contract, adding him back to their active roster. He struggled in 2 total appearances for Pittsburgh, allowing 3 runs on 2 hits across 2/3 of an inning. Partch was designated for assignment again on September 6. He cleared waivers and returned to Indianapolis via outright assignment on September 9. Partch elected free agency on October 3.

=== York Revolution ===
On April 5, 2017, Partch signed with the York Revolution of the Atlantic League of Professional Baseball. In 20 appearances (9 starts) for York, he struggled to a 3–5 record and 6.39 ERA with 43 strikeouts across 56 1/3 innings pitched. On November 1, Partch became a free agent.

== Personal life ==
He is the great-grandson of experimental composer Harry Partch.
