= Derrick Robinson =

American baseball player (born 1987)

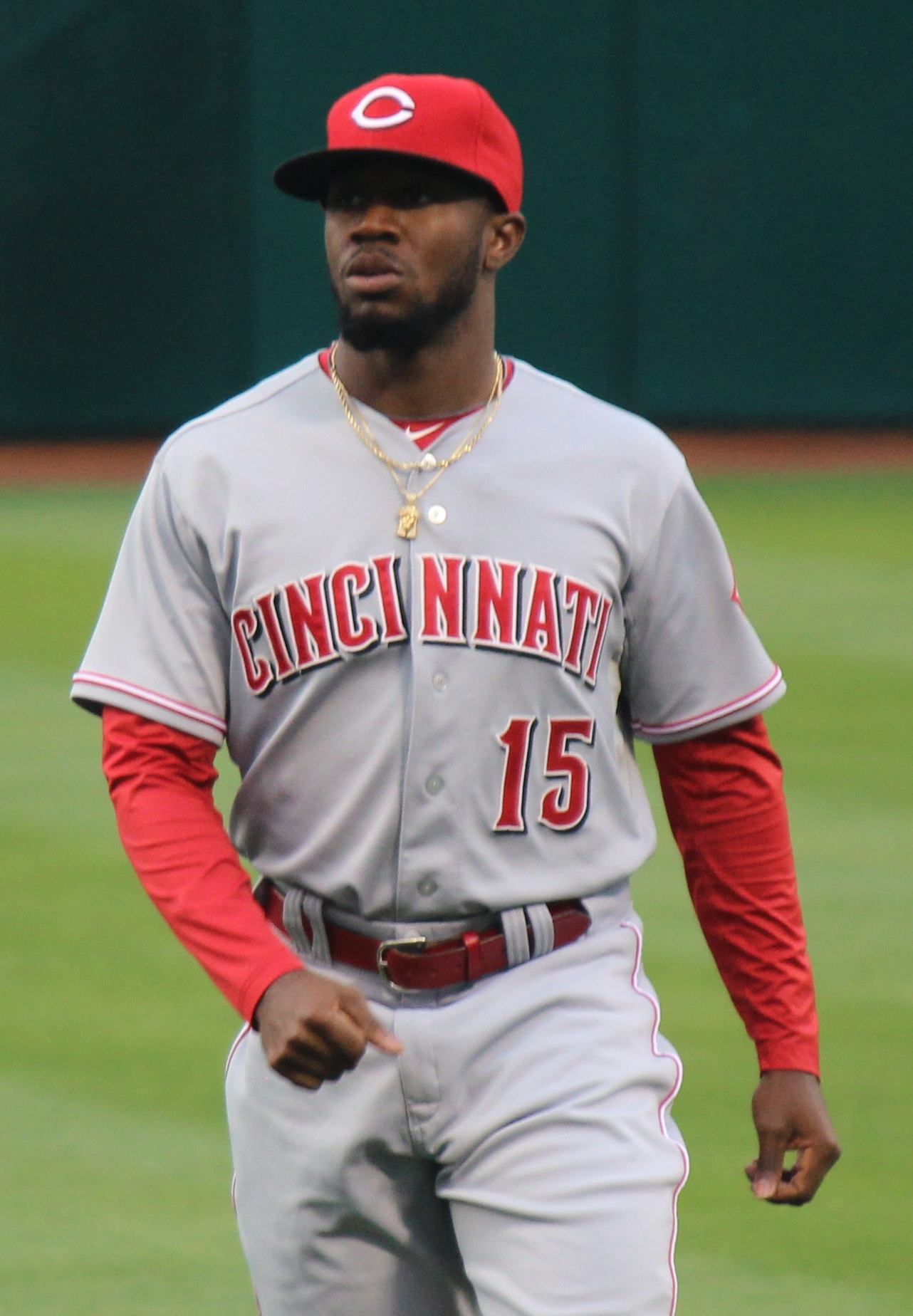
- Robinson with the Cincinnati Reds
- Outfielder
- Born: September 28, 1987 (age 38); Gainesville, Florida, U.S.
- Batted: Switch Threw: Left

MLB debut
- April 5, 2013, for the Cincinnati Reds

Last MLB appearance
- September 29, 2013, for the Cincinnati Reds

MLB statistics
- Batting average: .255
- Home runs: 0
- Runs batted in: 8
- Stats at Baseball Reference

Teams
- Cincinnati Reds (2013)

Derrick Lamar Robinson (born September 28, 1987) is an American former professional baseball outfielder. He played in Major League Baseball (MLB) for the Cincinnati Reds in 2013.

== Playing career ==
=== Kansas City Royals ===
Robinson was drafted by the Kansas City Royals in the fourth round, with the 107th overall selection, of the 2006 Major League Baseball draft. He spent 2008 with the High-A Wilmington Blue Rocks, playing in 124 games and hitting .246/.317/.322 with no home runs, 34 RBI, and 62 stolen bases. Following the season, Robinson was named Kansas City's baserunner of the year.

Robinson spent the 2010 season with the Double-A Northwest Arkansas Naturals, playing in 127 games and hitting .286/.345/.380 with two home runs, 48 RBI, and 50 stolen bases. On November 19, 2010, the Royals added Robinson to their 40-man roster to protect him from the Rule 5 draft.

Robinson was named the left-fielder for the 2012 Minor League Rawlings Gold Glove Award team. On November 20, 2012, Robinson was designated for assignment after multiple prospects were added to the 40-man roster. On November 30, the Royals non-tendered Robinson, making him a free agent.

=== Cincinnati Reds ===
On December 20, 2012, Robinson signed a minor league contract with the Cincinnati Reds organization. On April 3, 2013, the Reds selected Robinson's contract after he made the team's Opening Day roster. In 102 appearances for Cincinnati during his rookie campaign, he batted .255/.322/.323 with no home runs, eight RBI, and four stolen bases. Robinson was designated for assignment following the signing of Skip Schumaker on November 26. On December 2, the Reds non-tendered Robinson, making him a free agent.

On February 26, 2014, it was announced that Robinson would miss the entirety of the 2014 season after undergoing shoulder surgery.

=== Washington Nationals ===
On January 23, 2015, Robinson signed a minor league contract with the Washington Nationals. In 93 appearances split between the Double-A Harrisburg Senators and Triple-A Syracuse Chiefs, he batted .249/.315/.266 with no home runs, 21 RBI, and 18 stolen bases. Robinson elected free agency following the season on November 6.

=== Sioux City Explorers ===
On May 17, 2016, Robinson signed with the Sioux City Explorers of the American Association of Independent Professional Baseball. In 84 games for Sioux City, Robinson batted .313/.393/.397 with two home runs, 36 RBI, and 31 stolen bases.

=== York Revolution ===
On April 12, 2017, Robinson signed with the York Revolution of the Atlantic League of Professional Baseball. In 41 appearances for the Revolution, he batted .225/.301/.271 with no home runs, nine RBI, and seven stolen bases. Robinson became a free agent following the season.

=== Kansas City Royals (second stint) ===
On May 28, 2019, Robinson signed a minor league contract with the Kansas City Royals. He did not play in a game for the organization and elected free agency following the season on November 4.

== Coaching career ==
Robinson joined the Kansas City Royals organization as a baseball operations intern for the 2020 season. Robinson remained with the organization in 2021 as an outfield, baserunning, and bunting coordinator.
