= Justin Freeman =

American baseball player (born 1986)

- Pitcher
- Born: October 22, 1986 (age 39); Macon, Georgia, U.S.
- Batted: Right Threw: Right

MLB debut
- April 17, 2013, for the Cincinnati Reds

Last appearance
- April 17, 2013, for the Cincinnati Reds

MLB statistics
- Win–loss record: 0–0
- Earned run average: 18.00
- Strikeouts: 0
- Stats at Baseball Reference

Teams
- Cincinnati Reds (2013)

Justin Michael Freeman (born October 22, 1986) is an American former professional baseball pitcher. He played one game in Major League Baseball (MLB) for the Cincinnati Reds in 2013.

== Professional career ==
Freeman was drafted by the Cincinnati Reds in the 32nd round, with the 959th overall selection, of the 2008 Major League Baseball draft out Kennesaw State University. He made his professional debut with the rookie-level Billings Mustangs. In 2009, Freeman made 37 appearances for the High-A Sarasota Reds, posting a 2-5 record and 3.48 ERA with 48 strikeouts and three saves across 64 2/3 innings pitched.

Freeman split the 2010 campaign between the High-A Lynchburg Hillcats and Double-A Carolina Mudcats, accumulating a 1-2 record and 2.84 ERA with 58 strikeouts over 53 appearances. He returned to Carolina in 2011, logging a 2-4 record and 5.25 ERA with 56 strikeouts across 54 appearances out of the bullpen. Freeman made 57 relief outings for the Double-A Pensacola Blue Wahoos during the 2012 campaign, registering a 4-7 record and 2.91 ERA with 68 strikeouts and 16 saves over 68 innings of work.

On April 15, 2013, Freeman was selected to the 40-man roster and promoted to the major leagues for the first time. He made his MLB debut on April 17, against the Philadelphia Phillies, giving up two earned runs in one inning of relief pitching. Freeman was designated for assignment by the Reds on August 30, following the promotion of Zach Duke. He was released by the team on August 31, but was re-signed to a minor league contract on September 23.

Freeman split 2014 between Pensacola and the Triple-A Louisville Bats, posting a cumulative 4-1 record and 4.24 ERA with 39 strikeouts and eight saves in 46 2/3 innings pitched across 44 games. He became a free agent after the season.
