= Thomas Neal (baseball) =

American baseball player (born 1987)

- Outfielder
- Born: August 17, 1987 (age 38); Inglewood, California, U.S.
- Batted: Right Threw: Right

MLB debut
- September 2, 2012, for the Cleveland Indians

Last MLB appearance
- August 7, 2013, for the Chicago Cubs

MLB statistics
- Batting average: .184
- Home runs: 0
- Runs batted in: 2
- Stats at Baseball Reference

Teams
- Cleveland Indians (2012); New York Yankees (2013); Chicago Cubs (2013)

Thomas Neal (born August 17, 1987) is a retired American professional baseball outfielder who is currently a hitting coach for the San Francisco Giants organization. He has played in Major League Baseball (MLB) for the Cleveland Indians, New York Yankees and Chicago Cubs.

== Major League career ==
=== San Francisco Giants ===
Neal attended Poway High School in Poway, California, and Riverside Community College. The San Francisco Giants selected him in the 36th round of the 2005 Major League Baseball draft.

On April 28, 2009, while playing for the San Jose Giants of the California League, Neal hit for the cycle in a 17–7 victory over the Lancaster JetHawks.

=== Cleveland Indians ===
Neal was traded to the Cleveland Indians on July 30, 2011, in exchange for Orlando Cabrera. He was optioned to the Triple-A Columbus Clippers.

Neal was designated for assignment on April 4, 2012, but was added to the Indians major league roster as a September call-up on September 1, 2012.

Neal was designated for assignment by the Indians on January 3, 2013, to make room for Nick Swisher on their roster. He was released by the Indians on January 12, 2013.

=== New York Yankees ===
The New York Yankees signed him to a minor-league contract later that month. The Yankees promoted Neal to the major leagues on June 14. He was sent back down to Triple-A on June 22. He was recalled again on July 20, sent back down on July 26, and designated for assignment August 2.

=== Chicago Cubs ===
Neal was claimed off waivers by the Chicago Cubs on August 5, 2013. Two days later on August 7, Neal dislocated his right shoulder while making a throw from left field, effectively ending his season. In two games for Chicago, he went 0–for–4. On October 9, Neal was removed from the 40–man roster and sent outright to the Triple–A Iowa Cubs.

=== Cincinnati Reds ===
He signed a minor league deal with the Cincinnati Reds in January 2014. He became a free agent after the 2014 season.

=== Somerset Patriots ===
Neal signed with the Somerset Patriots of the Atlantic League of Professional Baseball for the 2015 season.

=== Coaching career ===
He became a free agent and retired after the 2015 season and became a minor league hitting coach in the San Francisco Giants Organization.
