= J. J. Hoover =

American baseball player (born 1987)

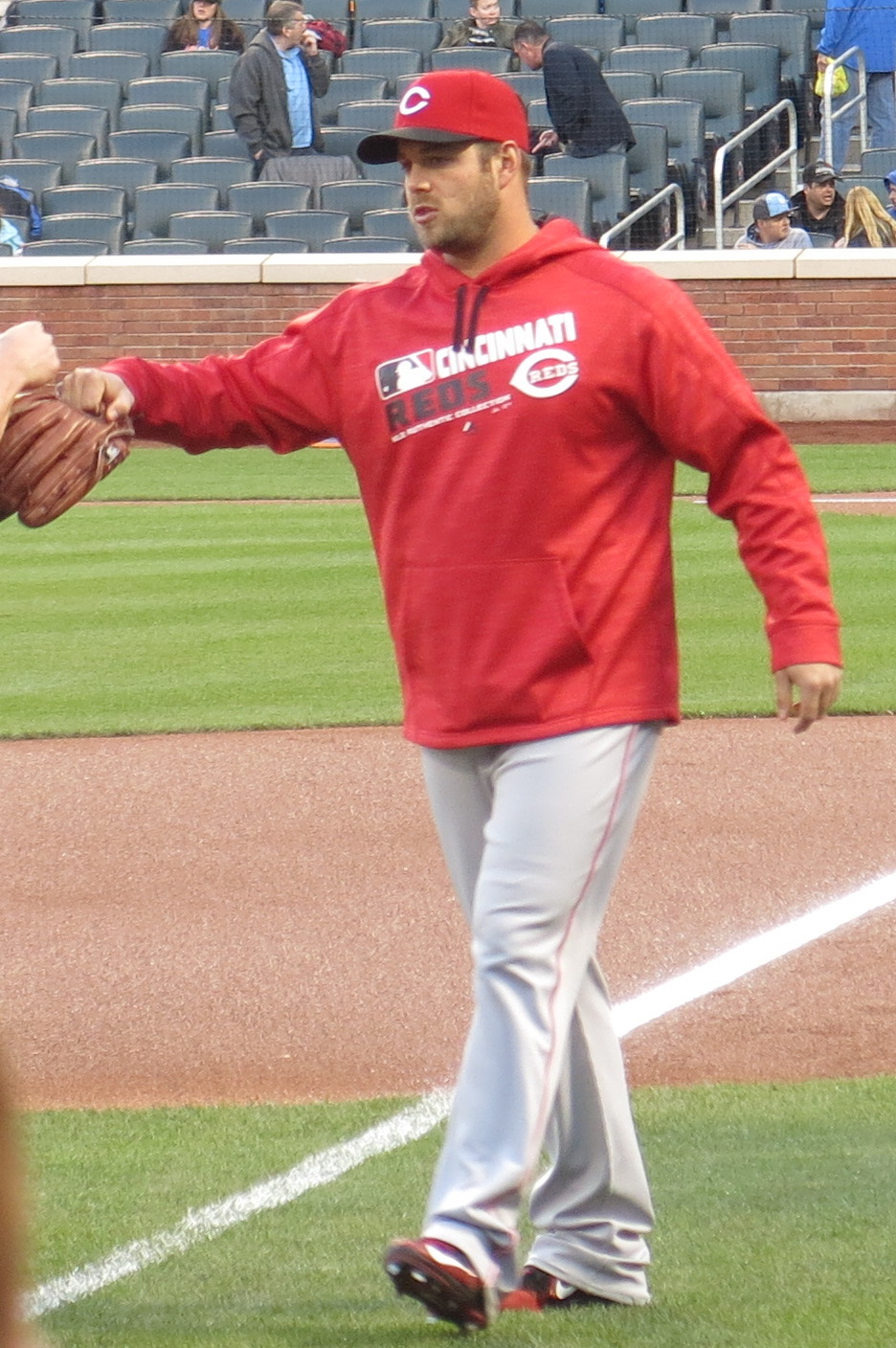
- Hoover with the Cincinnati Reds in 2016
- Pitcher
- Born: August 13, 1987 (age 38); Elizabeth, Pennsylvania, U.S.
- Batted: Right Threw: Right

MLB debut
- April 25, 2012, for the Cincinnati Reds

Last MLB appearance
- April 10, 2018, for the Milwaukee Brewers

MLB statistics
- Win–loss record: 19–21
- Earned run average: 4.17
- Strikeouts: 294
- Stats at Baseball Reference

Teams
- Cincinnati Reds (2012–2016); Arizona Diamondbacks (2017); Milwaukee Brewers (2018)

James Alan Hoover Jr. (born August 13, 1987) is an American former professional baseball pitcher and pitching coach. He played in Major League Baseball (MLB) for the Cincinnati Reds, Arizona Diamondbacks, and Milwaukee Brewers.

== Early life ==
James Alan Hoover Jr. was born on August 13, 1987, in Elizabeth, Pennsylvania, to Jim and Carol Hoover. He graduated from Elizabeth Forward High School in 2006, and attended Calhoun Community College. In 2008, he played collegiate summer baseball with the Harwich Mariners of the Cape Cod Baseball League and was named a league all-star.

== Professional career ==
=== Atlanta Braves ===
Hoover was drafted by the Atlanta Braves in the 10th round of the 2008 Major League Baseball draft out of Calhoun Community College. He made his professional debut with the rookie ball Danville Braves, posting 4.2 scoreless innings of work. The next year, Hoover split the season between the Single-A Rome Braves and the High-A Myrtle Beach Pelicans, recording a 7–6 record and 3.47 ERA in 26 appearances between the two teams. In 2010, Hoover split the year between the Double-A Mississippi Braves and Myrtle Beach, accumulating a 14–7 record and 3.29 ERA with 152 strikeouts in 153.1 innings pitched. In 2011, he split the season between Mississippi and the Triple-A Gwinnett Braves, logging a 3–6 record and 2.34 ERA with 117 strikeouts in 105.2 innings of work.

He was added to the Braves' 40-man roster on November 16, 2011, a move meant to protect him from the Rule 5 Draft. Baseball America ranked him the twelfth-best Braves prospect prior to the 2012 season.

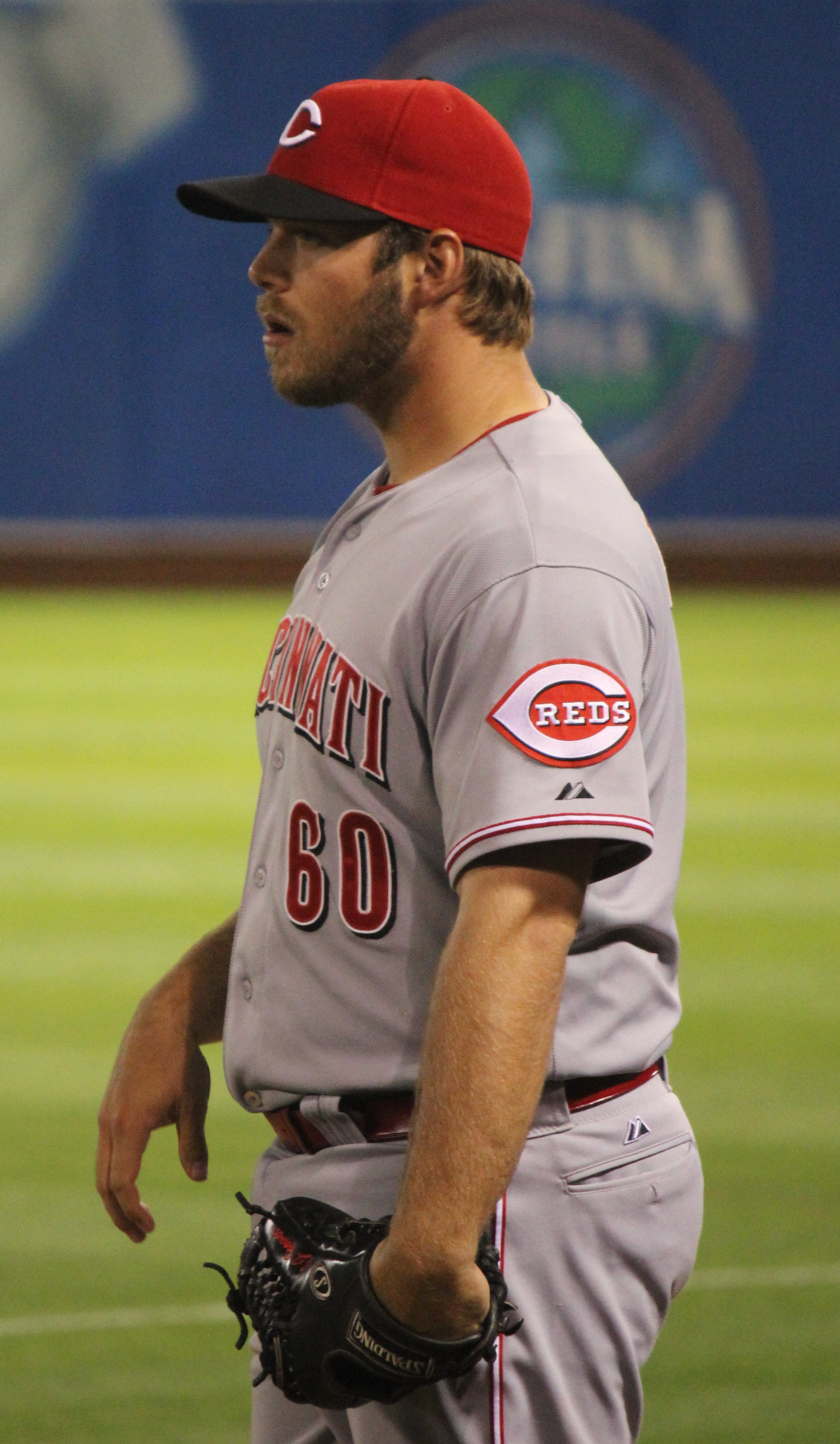
Hoover with the Cincinnati Reds in 2013.

=== Cincinnati Reds ===
On April 1, 2012, Hoover was traded to the Cincinnati Reds for Juan Francisco. Hoover started the 2012 season with the Triple A Louisville Bats. On April 24, Hoover was called to the major leagues for the first time. He made his debut the next day against the San Francisco Giants, and retired the side. He earned his first career Major League save on September 12, 2012, against the Pittsburgh Pirates. Hoover ended the season with 26 appearances and a 2.05 ERA. He was placed on the Reds' Opening Day roster in 2013. During the 2013 season, Hoover set a team record for right-handed pitchers at 26 1/3 innings pitched without an earned run. That year, he pitched in 69 games, and had a 2.86 ERA. Hoover opened the 2014 season with the Reds, and was optioned back to the AAA Louisville Bats on August 21, 2014. At the time, he was 1–10 with a 5.27 ERA in 46 appearances that season. Hoover was recalled to the majors in September and finished the season with a 4.88 ERA. Hoover made the Reds Opening Day roster in 2015, and finished the season with an 8–2 record and 2.94 ERA. Eligible for arbitration for the first time in the 2015–16 offseason, he was awarded $1.4 million. Hoover became the first player to take the Reds to a hearing since Chris Reitsma in 2004. Shortly after spring training began in February 2016, manager Bryan Price named Hoover the Reds closer. On June 28, Hoover gave up his 6th career grand slam, the most in Cincinnati Reds history. He was outrighted off the Reds roster on August 4, 2016, after struggling to a 13.50 ERA in 18 appearances. On October 12, 2016, he elected free agency.

=== Arizona Diamondbacks ===
On January 10, 2017, Hoover signed a minor league contract with the Arizona Diamondbacks that included an invitation to spring training. After a strong spring, Hoover won a bullpen job for the D'Backs. In 52 appearances with Arizona in 2017, Hoover posted a 3–1 record and 3.92 ERA with 54 strikeouts in 41 1/3 innings of work. He was non-tendered by Arizona on December 1, and became a free agent.

=== Milwaukee Brewers ===
On January 10, 2018, Hoover signed a minor league deal with the Milwaukee Brewers organization. He was assigned to the Triple-A Colorado Springs Sky Sox to begin the 2018 season. He had his contract purchased to the active roster on April 7, 2018. He was designated for assignment on April 11 after posting a 20.25 ERA in 2 appearances. He was outrighted to Triple-A on April 15, and elected free agency a day later.

=== Washington Nationals ===
On February 1, 2019, Hoover signed a minor league contract with the Washington Nationals organization. He spent the season with the Triple-A Fresno Grizzlies, logging a 6–6 record and 8.47 ERA in 30 appearances with the team. Hoover elected free agency following the season on November 4.

=== Canberra Cavalry ===
On November 6, 2019, Hoover signed with the Canberra Cavalry of the Australian Baseball League. In 9 appearances with Canberra, Hoover pitched to a 4–2 record and 3.81 ERA with 51 strikeouts in 52.0 innings of work.

=== Lexington Legends ===
On June 14, 2021, Hoover signed with the Kansas City Monarchs of the American Association of Independent Professional Baseball. Hoover did not appear in a game with the Monarchs before being traded to the Lexington Legends of the Atlantic League of Professional Baseball in exchange for cash considerations on June 16. In 20 starts for the club, he posted a 7–1 record and 6.06 ERA with 95 strikeouts across 108 1/3 innings pitched.

In 2022, Hoover started 11 games for Lexington, struggling to a 2–6 record and 6.34 ERA with 50 strikeouts across 61 innings of work. He became a free agent following the season.

== Pitching style ==
Hoover throws three pitches: a four-seam fastball at 91–94 mph, a curveball (76–79), and a developing changeup to left-handed hitters (85–88).

== Personal life ==
Hoover is married to Megan-Kate Hoover. Hoover is a Christian. In 2025, Hoover opened a trading card shop in Alexandria, Kentucky called "Hoovs Hangout".
