= Tony Cingrani =

American baseball player (born 1989)

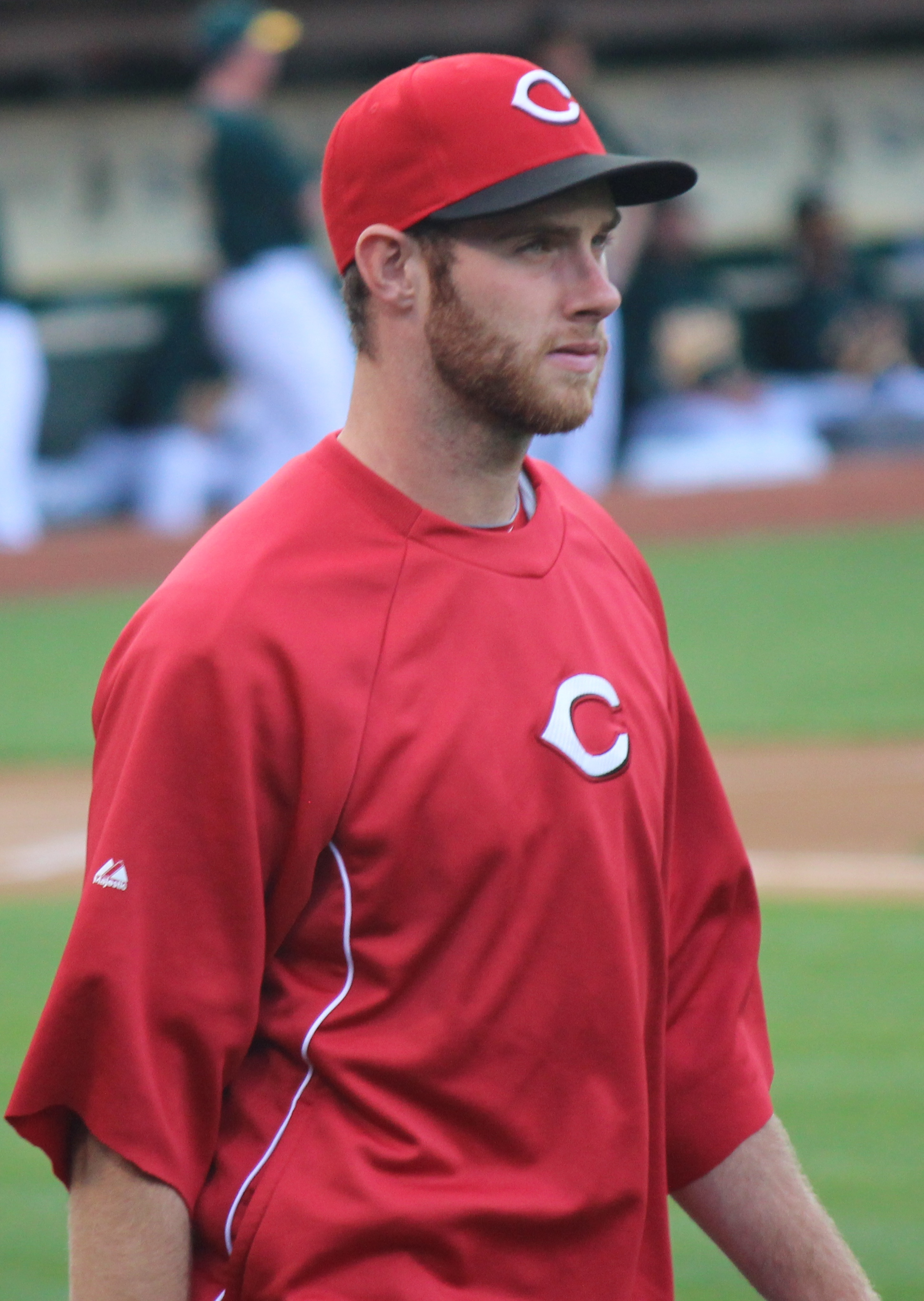
- Cingrani with the Cincinnati Reds in 2017
- Pitcher
- Born: July 5, 1989 (age 37); Evergreen Park, Illinois, U.S.
- Batted: Left Threw: Left

MLB debut
- September 9, 2012, for the Cincinnati Reds

Last MLB appearance
- September 22, 2018, for the Los Angeles Dodgers

MLB statistics
- Win–loss record: 12–22
- Earned run average: 4.01
- Strikeouts: 366
- Stats at Baseball Reference

Teams
- Cincinnati Reds (2012–2017); Los Angeles Dodgers (2017–2018)

Career highlights and awards
- Pitched a combined no-hitter on May 4, 2018

Anthony Michael Cingrani (born July 5, 1989) is an American former professional baseball pitcher. He played in Major League Baseball (MLB) for the Cincinnati Reds and Los Angeles Dodgers. Prior to playing professionally, he played for his high school baseball team at Lincoln-Way Central High School and for the college baseball teams at South Suburban College and Rice University.

== Amateur career ==
Cingrani attended Lincoln-Way Central High School in New Lenox, Illinois. He then enrolled at South Suburban College, a junior college in South Holland, Illinois, before transferring to Rice University, where he played baseball for the Rice Owls. In his junior year, his first season at Rice, Cingrani struggled as a starting pitcher, pitching to an 8.59 earned run average (ERA) in six games started, issuing 16 walks and striking out only 13. After the season, he asked the coaches if they wanted him off the team due to his poor performance, but they told him they thought he could make progress.

Cingrani worked with Rice's coaches to change his mechanics during the offseason, which resulted in improved fastball velocity: from 86 miles per hour (138 km/h) before the changes to 90 to 94 miles per hour (145–151 km/h) after. However, he did not make the Owls' starting rotation due to the inconsistency of his off-speed pitches. Converted into a relief pitcher for his senior season, Cingrani tied the school record with 12 saves. He also had a 4–2 win–loss record, a 1.74 ERA and struck out 66 batters while walking only 10 in 57 innings pitched.

== Professional career ==
=== Cincinnati Reds ===
The Cincinnati Reds selected Cingrani in the third round with the 114th selection of the 2011 Major League Baseball draft. He began his professional career with the Billings Mustangs of the Rookie-level Pioneer League, pitching in their starting rotation. He posted a 1.75 ERA in 13 games started.

Cingrani began the 2012 season with the Bakersfield Blaze of the Class A-Advanced California League and received a mid-season promotion to the Pensacola Blue Wahoos of the Class AA Southern League. He led all of minor league baseball with a 1.73 ERA. The Reds promoted Cingrani to the major leagues on September 4, 2012. He made his major league debut on September 9, throwing three innings in relief.

After starter Johnny Cueto was placed on the disabled list, Cingrani was called up by the Reds on April 18, 2013. In July, Cingrani bounced between Cincinnati and the Arizona League (AZL) Reds. He was optioned to the AZL Reds on July 17, recalled on July 23, optioned on July 24, and recalled on July 28. He did not appear in any games for the AZL Reds during this period.

During spring training in 2015, the Reds announced that Cingrani would serve as a relief pitcher during the season.

The next two seasons, Cingrani pitched to ERAs of 5.67 and 4.14 respectively. The 2017 season did not start any better for Cingrani, posting a 5.40 ERA while playing for the Reds.

=== Los Angeles Dodgers ===
Cingrani was traded to the Los Angeles Dodgers on July 31, 2017, for outfielder Scott Van Slyke and minor league catcher Hendrik Clementina.

Cingrani pitched in 19 1/3 innings in 22 games for the Dodgers during the 2017 season, posting a 2.79 ERA. In the postseason, he made two appearances in each of the NLDS and NLCS, giving up no runs and allowing only a single and a hit by pitch. He appeared in three games during the 2017 World Series, allowing one run to score on two hits with two strikeouts in three innings. After the season, he signed a one-year, $2.3 million, contract with the Dodgers for 2018, to avoid salary arbitration. On May 4, 2018, against the San Diego Padres at Estadio de Béisbol Monterrey, Cingrani was one of four pitchers involved in a combined no-hitter as the Dodgers won 4–0. Cingrani was limited to just 30 appearances on the season, posting a record of 1–2 with an ERA of 4.76. In the second half of 2018, Cingrani suffered a shoulder injury that kept him out for the rest of the season. In March 2019, he suffered a recurrence of the injury and the Dodgers shut him down for spring training. On May 4, he started a rehab assignment with the High-A Rancho Cucamonga Quakes team. On May 8, his rehab assignment was moved to Triple-A Oklahoma City. In June 2019, Cingrani underwent arthroscopic surgery to fix a left labrum tear and was ruled out for the season.

=== St. Louis Cardinals ===
On July 31, 2019, the Dodgers traded Cingrani and Jeffry Abreu to the St. Louis Cardinals for Jedd Gyorko, international cap space, and cash. On October 31, 2019, Cingrani became a free agent.

=== Lexington Legends ===
On May 13, 2021, Cingrani signed with the Lexington Legends of the Atlantic League of Professional Baseball. In 8 innings of relief in 8 games, he went 1–0 with a stellar 1.13 ERA with 14 strikeouts and 2 saves.

=== Chicago Cubs ===
On June 28, 2021, Cingrani's contract was purchased by the Chicago Cubs organization. Cingrani appeared in 12 games for the Triple-A Iowa Cubs, posting a 3.60 ERA with 15 strikeouts. On August 25, the Cubs released Cingrani.

== See also ==
- List of Major League Baseball single-inning strikeout leaders
- List of Major League Baseball no-hitters

Awards and achievements
| Preceded by Sean Manaea | No-hit game May 4, 2018 (with Buehler, García & Liberatore) | Succeeded by James Paxton |
