= Michael Bowden (baseball) =

American baseball pitcher (born 1986)

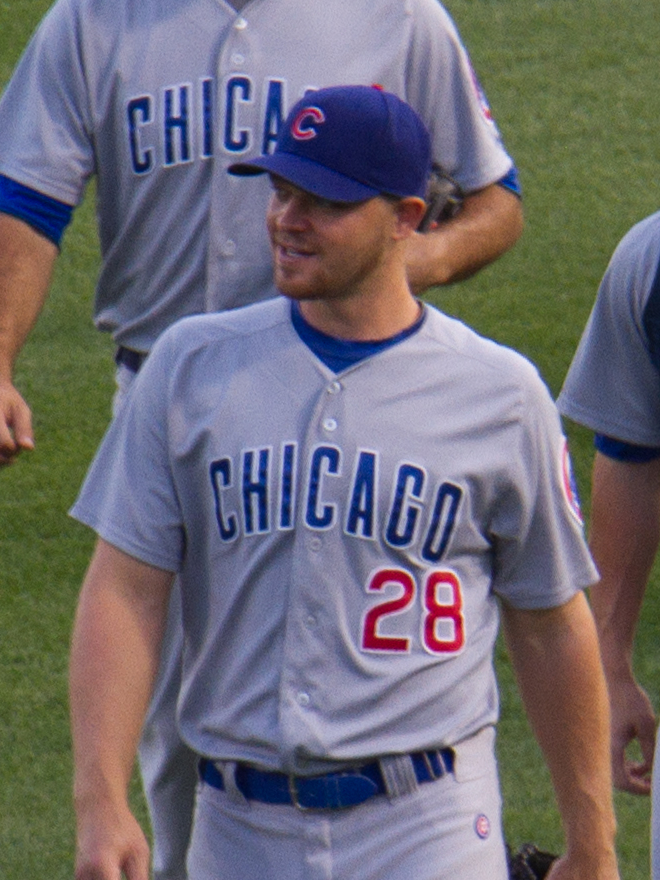
- Bowden with the Chicago Cubs in 2012
- Pitcher
- Born: September 9, 1986 (age 39); Winfield, Illinois, U.S.
- Batted: Right Threw: Right

Professional debut
- MLB: August 30, 2008, for the Boston Red Sox
- NPB: March 28, 2014, for the Saitama Seibu Lions
- KBO: April 6, 2016, for the Doosan Bears

Last appearance
- MLB: September 3, 2013, for the Chicago Cubs
- NPB: August 6, 2014, for the Saitama Seibu Lions
- KBO: October 1, 2017, for the Doosan Bears

MLB statistics
- Win–loss record: 3–5
- Earned run average: 4.51
- Strikeouts: 100

NPB statistics
- Win–loss record: 2–1
- Earned run average: 4.50
- Strikeouts: 30

KBO statistics
- Win–loss record: 21–12
- Earned run average: 4.07
- Strikeouts: 211
- Stats at Baseball Reference

Teams
- Boston Red Sox (2008–2012); Chicago Cubs (2012–2013); Saitama Seibu Lions (2014); Doosan Bears (2016–2017)

Career highlights and awards
- KBO: Pitched a no-hitter on June 30, 2016; Korean Series champion (2016); KBO Strikeout leader (2016)

Michael Matthew Bowden (born September 9, 1986) is an American former professional baseball pitcher. He played in Major League Baseball (MLB) with the Boston Red Sox and Chicago Cubs, in Nippon Professional Baseball (NPB) with the Saitama Seibu Lions, and in the KBO League for the Doosan Bears. He attended high school at Waubonsie Valley High School in Aurora, Illinois. He was selected by the Boston Red Sox in the first round of the 2005 MLB draft.

== Career ==
=== Boston Red Sox ===
Bowden began his professional career with the Gulf Coast League Red Sox in 2005, and advanced to the Greenville Drive the following season, also playing one game with the Wilmington Blue Rocks.

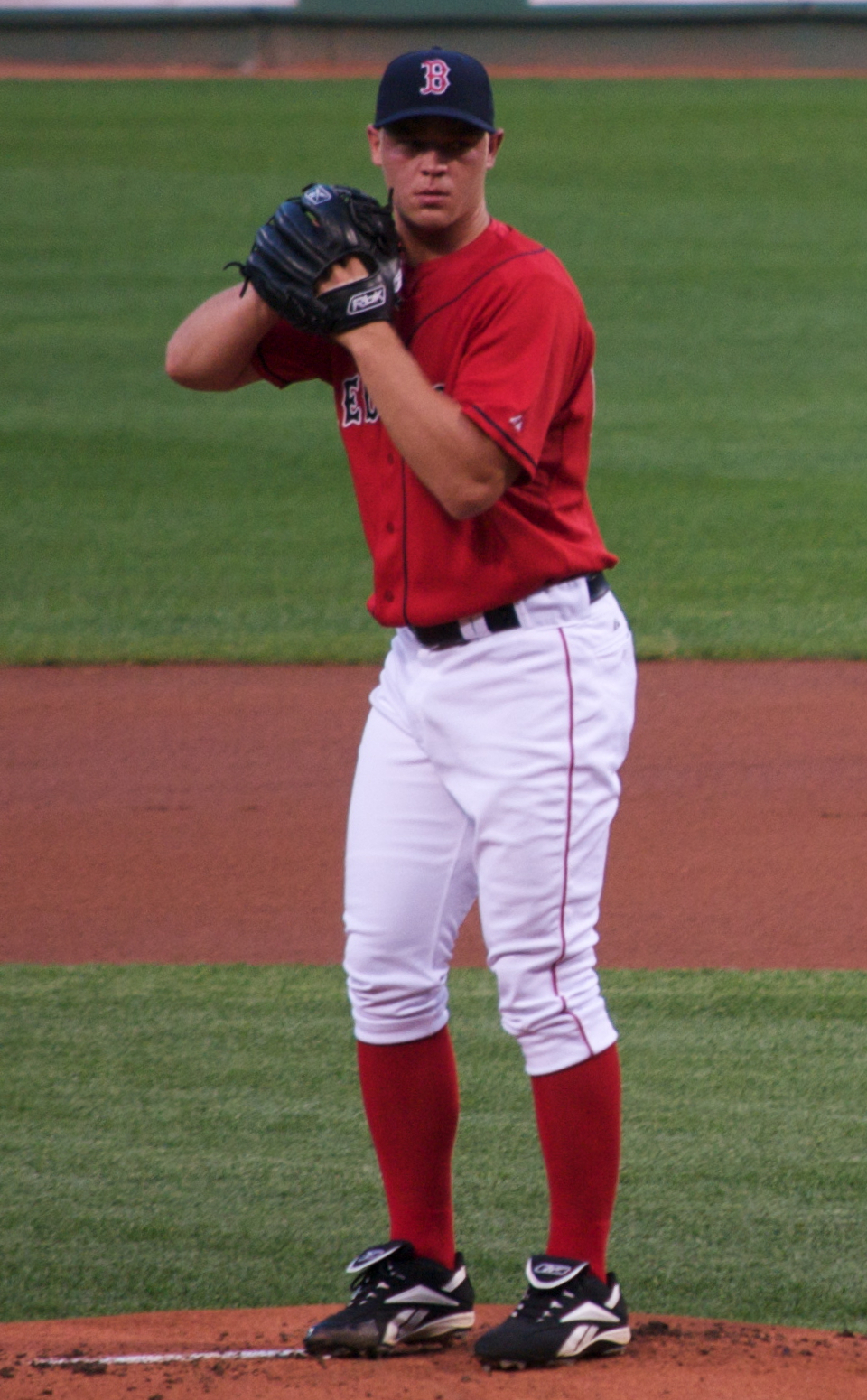
Bowden pitching for the Boston Red Sox in 2008

Bowden began the 2008 season with the Sea Dogs and was promoted to the Pawtucket Red Sox, the Triple-A affiliate of the Boston Red Sox, on July 18, 2008. On August 30, Bowden made his first major league start against the Chicago White Sox. He received the decision in a five-inning start, giving up seven hits and two runs in an 8–2 win. On April 26, 2009, Bowden was called up to bolster the bullpen after a night where the Red Sox bullpen got overworked. He later worked two perfect innings against the New York Yankees.

Bowden was recalled July 18, 2010 after spending the beginning of the season in Pawtucket. After three relief appearances, he was optioned back five days later to make room for Josh Beckett, who was coming off the disabled list. On August 14, 2010, Bowden was once again recalled, and then optioned back on August 28 to make room for Hideki Okajima.

In 2011, Bowden began the season with Pawtucket, for whom he pitched in 14 games with a 1.59 ERA. He was recalled to the Red Sox on May 17 when Daisuke Matsuzaka was placed on the 15-day disabled list with an elbow injury. Bowden was recalled on August 27, to replace Scott Atchison. On April 15, 2012, Bowden was designated for assignment.

=== Chicago Cubs ===
On April 21, 2012, Bowden was traded to the Chicago Cubs along with a player to be named later for Marlon Byrd. On April 14, 2013, Bowden, along with Edwin Jackson, broke the record for most wild pitches in an inning, with 5. He was designated for assignment on May 21, 2013. He returned to the Cubs when his contract was selected on July 11, 2013. He was designated for assignment again on September 4, 2013, and became a free agent on October 1.

=== Saitama Seibu Lions ===
Bowden signed a contract with the Seibu Lions of Nippon Professional Baseball for the 2014 season. He developed a split-finger fastball while playing for the Seibu Lions.

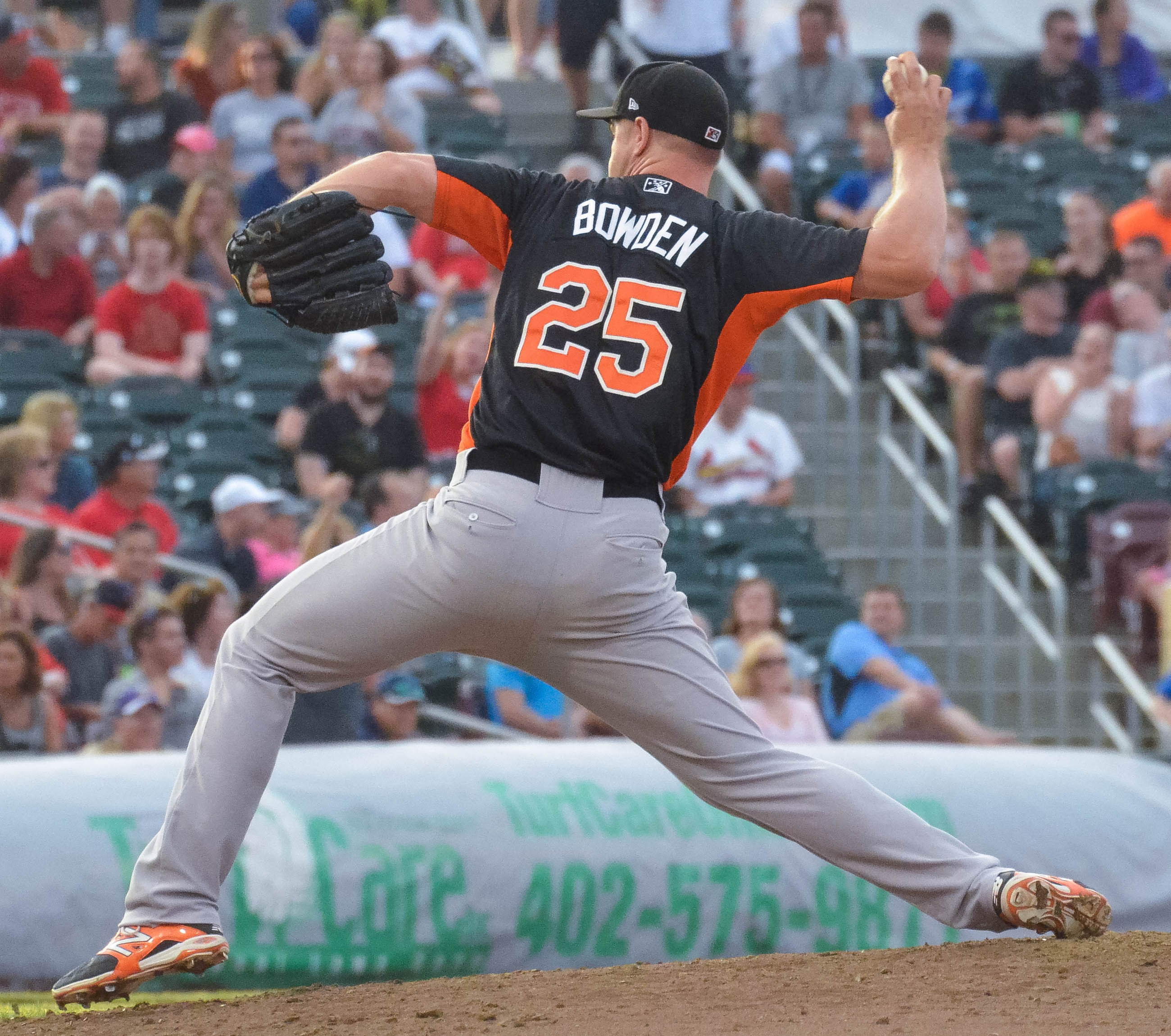
Bowden, during his tenure with the Norfolk Tides, at 2015 Triple-A All-Star Game

=== Cincinnati Reds ===
On December 24, 2014, Bowden signed a minor league contract with the Cincinnati Reds organization. On December 29, he was assigned to the Triple-A Louisville Bats.

=== Baltimore Orioles ===
On April 4, 2015, Bowden was traded to the Baltimore Orioles in exchange for cash considerations. He was immediately assigned to the Triple-A Norfolk Tides.

=== Minnesota Twins ===
Bowden signed a minor league contract with the Minnesota Twins on July 25, 2015. He elected free agency on November 6.

=== Doosan Bears ===
Bowden signed a one-year contract worth $650,000 with the Doosan Bears in the Korea Baseball Organization in November 2015. On June 30, 2016, Bowden pitched a complete game no-hitter against the NC Dinos. On December 12, 2016, Bowden re-signed his contract worth $1.1 mil with the Bears for the 2017 season. On November 25, 2017, Bowden announced that he would not be returning to the Bears for the 2018 season.

=== Los Angeles Dodgers ===
On March 4, 2019, Bowden signed a minor league contract with the Los Angeles Dodgers. He made one start for the AAA Oklahoma City Dodgers and four starts for the AA Tulsa Drillers, with a 6.97 ERA before he was released on June 3.

=== Pericos de Puebla ===
On June 29, 2019, Bowden signed with the Pericos de Puebla of the Mexican League. He was released on July 3, 2019. In 1 start he went 3 innings with a 9.00 era and 1 strikeout.

=== High Point Rockers ===
On July 13, 2019, Bowden signed with the High Point Rockers of the Atlantic League of Professional Baseball. He was released on September 11, 2019. In 9 starts 43 innings he went 2–4 with a 2.93 era and 53 strikeouts.

=== Chicago Dogs ===
On March 4, 2021, Bowden signed with the Chicago Dogs of the American Association of Professional Baseball. In 2021, Bowden recorded a 7–1 record and 2.92 ERA in 12 appearances with the Dogs. On June 16, 2022, Bowden was released by the Dogs.
