= 2013 San Diego Padres season =

2013 San Diego Padres
- League: National League
- Division: West
- Ballpark: Petco Park
- City: San Diego, California
- Record: 76–86 (.469)
- Divisional place: 3rd
- Owners: Ron Fowler
- General managers: Josh Byrnes
- Managers: Bud Black
- Television: Fox Sports San Diego (Dick Enberg, Mark Grant, Tony Gwynn, Mike Pomeranz, Mark Sweeney); Cablemas (Spanish)
- Radio: XX Sports Radio (Ted Leitner, Jerry Coleman, Bob Scanlan, Andy Masur); XEMO-AM (Spanish) (Eduardo Otega, Juan Angel Avila)

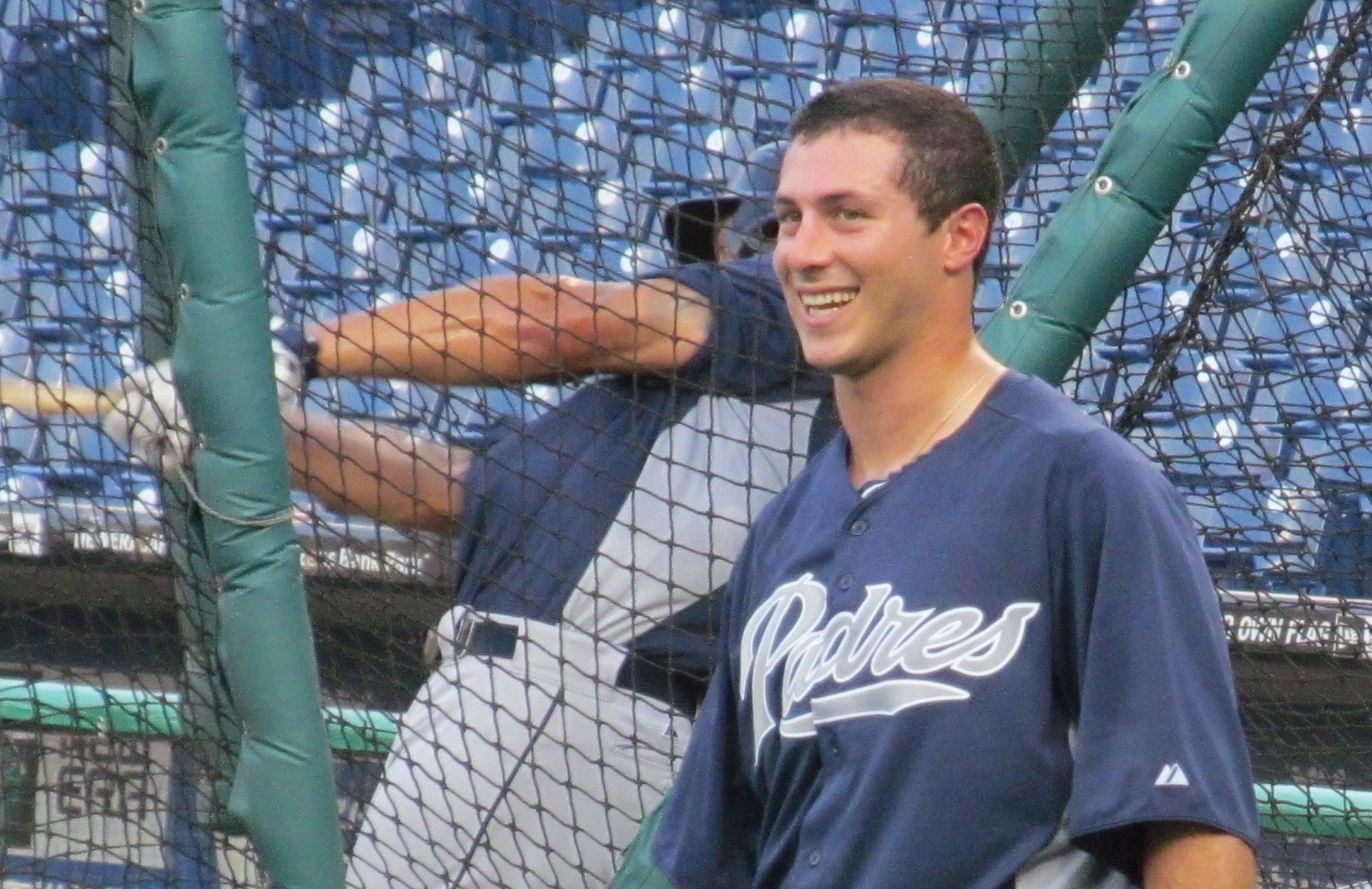
Tommy Medica during batting practice in Philadelphia 2013

The 2013 San Diego Padres season was their 45th season in MLB, and their ninth at Petco Park.

The Padres started the season on April 1 against the New York Mets. The Padres matched their record from the previous year of 76–86.

== Offseason and spring training ==
On January 30, 2013, 2012 Gold Glove and Silver Slugger third baseman Chase Headley signed a one-year contract worth $8.575 million with San Diego. On March 17, 2013, during spring training, he fractured the tip of his left thumb when it got caught under the second base bag while he was sliding feet-first to break up a double play. He started the season on the disabled list, and returned exactly a month after the injury on April 17.

The Padres finished in eleventh place at the end of spring training, eleven games behind first place Kansas City Royals, with a 16-20 record (10-9 home / 6-11 away) and .444 percentage in the Cactus League.

== Regular season ==
The Padres began the season with a 5–15 record, but then went 30–19 to move a game above .500 (35–34) for the first time since ending the 2010 season at 90–72.

Rookie second baseman Jedd Gyorko finished the season as the team leader in both home runs (HR) (23) and runs batted in (RBI) (63). His HR total led all MLB rookies that season, and he was the first rookie second baseman in MLB history to lead his team in RBIs. Additionally, he became just the second rookie to lead the Padres in either category since Nate Colbert in San Diego's inaugural season in 1969.

== Season standings ==
=== National League West ===
NL West
Team	W	L	Pct.	GB	Home	Road
Los Angeles Dodgers	92	70	.568	—	47‍–‍34	45‍–‍36
Arizona Diamondbacks	81	81	.500	11	45‍–‍36	36‍–‍45
San Diego Padres	76	86	.469	16	45‍–‍36	31‍–‍50
San Francisco Giants	76	86	.469	16	42‍–‍40	34‍–‍46
Colorado Rockies	74	88	.457	18	45‍–‍36	29‍–‍52

=== National League Wild Card ===
Division winners
Team	W	L	Pct.
St. Louis Cardinals	97	65	.599
Atlanta Braves	96	66	.593
Los Angeles Dodgers	92	70	.568

Wild Card teams (Top 2 teams qualify for postseason)
Team	W	L	Pct.	GB
Pittsburgh Pirates	94	68	.580	+4
Cincinnati Reds	90	72	.556	—
Washington Nationals	86	76	.531	4
Arizona Diamondbacks	81	81	.500	9
San Francisco Giants	76	86	.469	14
San Diego Padres	76	86	.469	14
Colorado Rockies	74	88	.457	16
New York Mets	74	88	.457	16
Milwaukee Brewers	74	88	.457	16
Philadelphia Phillies	73	89	.451	17
Chicago Cubs	66	96	.407	24
Miami Marlins	62	100	.383	28

2013 National League record Source: MLB Standings Grid – 2013
Team	AZ	ATL	CHC	CIN	COL	LAD	MIA	MIL	NYM	PHI	PIT	SD	SF	STL	WSH	AL
Arizona	—	2–4	4–3	3–4	12–7	10–9	4–2	6–1	3–4	3–4	3–3	7–12	7–12	4–3	2–4	11–9
Atlanta	4–2	—	5–1	4–3	6–1	5–2	13–6	2–4	10–9	11–8	4–3	1–5	3–4	4–3	13–6	11–9
Chicago	3–4	1–5	—	5–14	3–3	1–6	4–3	6–13	3–3	3–3	7–12	3–4	4–3	7–12	3–4	13–7
Cincinnati	4–3	3–4	14–5	—	2–4	4–3	6–1	10–9	4–2	4–2	8–11	3–3	6–1	8–11	3–4	11–9
Colorado	7–12	1–6	3–3	4–2	—	10–9	3–4	4–2	3–4	3–4	4–2	12–7	9–10	3–4	3–4	5–15
Los Angeles	9–10	2–5	6–1	3–4	9–10	—	5–2	4–2	5–1	5–2	4–2	11–8	8–11	4–3	5–1	12–8
Miami	2–4	6–13	3–4	1–6	4–3	2–5	—	1–5	11–8	7–12	2–4	3–4	4–3	2–4	5–14	9–11
Milwaukee	1–6	4–2	13–6	9–10	2–4	2–4	5–1	—	4–3	5–2	7–12	3–4	5–2	5–14	3–4	6–14
New York	4–3	9–10	3–3	2–4	4–3	1–5	8–11	3–4	—	10–9	2–5	4–3	4–2	2–5	7–12	11–9
Philadelphia	4–3	8–11	3–3	2–4	4–3	2–5	12–7	2–5	9–10	—	3–4	4–2	3–3	2–5	8–11	7–13
Pittsburgh	3–3	3–4	12–7	11–8	2–4	2–4	4–2	12–7	5–2	4–3	—	3–4	4–3	10–9	4–3	15–5
San Diego	12–7	5–1	4–3	3–3	7–12	8–11	4–3	4–3	3–4	2–4	4–3	—	8–11	2–4	2–5	8–12
San Francisco	12–7	4–3	3–4	1–6	10–9	11–8	3–4	2–5	2–4	3–3	3–4	11–8	—	2–4	3–3	6–14
St. Louis	3–4	3–4	12–7	11–8	4–3	3–4	4–2	14–5	5–2	5–2	9–10	4–2	4–2	—	6–0	10–10
Washington	4–2	6–13	4–3	4–3	4–3	1–5	14–5	4–3	12–7	11–8	3–4	5–2	3–3	0–6	—	11–9

=== Game log ===
Legend
	Padres win
	Padres loss
	Postponement
**Bold**	Padres team member

2013 Game Log (76-86)
April (10–16)

#	Date	Opponent	Score	Win	Loss	Save	Attendance	Record	Box
1	April 1	@ Mets	2–11	Niese (1–0)	**Vólquez** (0–1)		41,053	0–1	Box
2	April 3	@ Mets	4–8	Harvey (1–0)	**Richard** (0–1)		22,239	0–2	Box
3	April 4	@ Mets	2–1	**Stults** (1–0)	Gee (0–1)	**Street** (1)	21,519	1–2	Box
4	April 5	@ Rockies	2–5	Francis (1–0)	**Marquis** (0–1)	Betancourt (2)	49,077	1–3	Box
5	April 6	@ Rockies	3–6	Garland (1–0)	**Ross** (0–1)	Betancourt (3)	31,133	1–4	Box
6	April 7	@ Rockies	1–9	Chacín (1–0)	**Vólquez** (0–2)		31,060	1–5	Box
7	April 9	Dodgers	9–3	**Gregerson** (1–0)	Belisario (0–1)		44,436	2–5	Box
8	April 10	Dodgers	3–4	Billingsley (1–0)	**Stults** (1–1)	League (3)	22,843	2–6	Box
9	April 11	Dodgers	2–3	Guerrier (1–0)	**Gregerson** (1–1)	Jansen (1)	24,610	2–7	Box
10	April 12	Rockies	5–7	Brothers (1–0)	**Street** (0–1)	Betancourt (4)	21,814	2–8	Box
11	April 13	Rockies	5–9	Chacín (2–0)	**Vólquez** (0–3)		29,523	2–9	Box
12	April 14	Rockies	1–2	de la Rosa (1–1)	**Thayer** (0–1)	Betancourt (5)	21,337	2–10	Box
13	April 15	@ Dodgers	6–3	**Stults** (2–1)	Belisario (0–2)	**Street** (2)	52,136	3–10	Box
14	April 16	@ Dodgers	9–2	**Marquis** (1–1)	Capuano (0–1)		35,898	4–10	Box
15	April 17	@ Dodgers	7–2	**Brach** (1–0)	Kershaw (2–2)		52,393	5–10	Box
16	April 19	@ Giants	2–3	Casilla (2–1)	**Gregerson** (1–2)		41,559	5–11	Box
17	April 20	@ Giants	0–2	Lincecum (2–0)	**Cashner** (0–1)	Romo (8)	41,995	5–12	Box
18	April 21	@ Giants	0–5	Zito (3–1)	**Stults** (2–2)		42,747	5–13	Box
19	April 22	Brewers	1–7	Lohse (1–1)	**Marquis** (1–2)		18,643	5–14	Box
20	April 23	Brewers	3–6	Gallardo (2–1)	**Richard** (0–2)	Henderson (5)	19,560	5–15	Box
21	April 24	Brewers	2–1	**Vólquez** (1–3)	Estrada (2–1)	**Street** (3)	17,205	6–15	Box
22	April 26	Giants	2–1	**Cashner** (1–1)	Lincecum (2–1)	**Street** (4)	34,929	7–15	Box
23	April 27	Giants	8–7	**Thatcher** (1–0)	Romo (1–2)		38,823	8–15	Box
24	April 28	Giants	6–4	**Marquis** (2–2)	Vogelsong (1–2)	**Street** (5)	33,722	9–15	Box
25	April 29	@ Cubs	3–5	Bowden (1–1)	**Richard** (0–3)	Gregg (4)	32,169	9–16	Box
26	April 30	@ Cubs	13–7	**Vólquez** (2–3)	Jackson (0–4)		31,303	10–16	Box

May (15–13)

#	Date	Opponent	Score	Win	Loss	Save	Attendance	Record	Box
27	May 1	@ Cubs	2–6	Feldman (2–3)	**Cashner** (1–2)		34,832	10–17	Box
28	May 2	@ Cubs	4–2	**Thatcher** (2–0)	Wood (2–2)	**Street** (6)	32,865	11–17	Box
29	May 3	Diamondbacks	7–6	**Marquis** (3–2)	Miley (2–1)	**Street** (7)	31,223	12–17	Box
30	May 4	Diamondbacks	1–8	Corbin (4–0)	**Richard** (0–4)		31,336	12–18	Box
31	May 5	Diamondbacks	5–1	**Vólquez** (3–3)	Kennedy (1–3)		29,101	13–18	Box
32	May 6	Marlins	5–0	**Cashner** (2–2)	LeBlanc (0–5)		14,596	14–18	Box
33	May 7	Marlins	5–1	**Stults** (3–2)	Sanabia (2–5)		16,263	15–18	Box
34	May 8	Marlins	1–0	**Marquis** (4–2)	Nolasco (2–4)	**Street** (8)	16,730	16–18	Box
35	May 10	@ Rays	3–6	McGee (1–2)	**Thayer** (0–2)	Rodney (5)	12,424	16–19	Box
36	May 11	@ Rays	7–8	Ramos (1–0)	**Street** (0–2)		18,587	16–20	Box
37	May 12	@ Rays	2–4	Hernández (2–4)	**Stults** (3–3)	Rodney (6)	17,396	16–21	Box
38	May 14	@ Orioles	3–2	**Gregerson** (2–2)	Johnson (1–3)	**Street** (9)	19,096	17–21	Box
39	May 15	@ Orioles	8–4	**Marquis** (5–2)	García (0–2)		32,418	18–21	Box
40	May 16	Nationals	2–6	Strasburg (2–5)	**Vólquez** (3–4)		24,234	18–22	Box
41	May 17	Nationals	5–6 (10)	Soriano (1–1)	**Street** (0–3)	Storen (1)	29,898	18–23	Box
42	May 18	Nationals	2–1	**Stults** (4–3)	Zimmermann (7–2)	**Street** (10)	33,646	19–23	Box
43	May 19	Nationals	13–4	**Cashner** (3–2)	Haren (4–5)		27,080	20–23	Box
44	May 20	Cardinals	4–2	**Marquis** (6–2)	Miller (5–3)	**Street** (11)	18,763	21–23	Box
45	May 21	Cardinals	2–10	Wainwright (6–3)	**Vólquez** (3–5)		18,702	21–24	Box
46	May 22	Cardinals	3–5	Lyons (1–0)	**Smith** (0–1)		18,683	21–25	Box
47	May 24	@ Diamondbacks	2–5	McCarthy (2–3)	**Stults** (4–4)	Bell (7)	24,043	21–26	Box
48	May 25	@ Diamondbacks	10–4	**Cashner** (4–2)	Miley (3–4)		26,628	22–26	Box
49	May 26	@ Diamondbacks	5–6	Corbin (8–0)	**Layne** (0–1)	Bell (8)	27,639	22–27	Box
50	May 27	@ Mariners	0–9	Harang (2–5)	**Richard** (0–5)		18,942	22–28	Box
51	May 28	@ Mariners	6–1	**Vólquez** (4–5)	Maurer (2–7)		11,911	23–28	Box
52	May 29	Mariners	3–2 (10)	**Gregerson** (3–2)	Medina (1–1)		19,882	24–28	Box
53	May 30	Mariners	1–7	Hernández (6–4)	**Cashner** (4–3)		18,809	24–29	Box
54	May 31	Blue Jays	4–3 (17)	**Richard** (1–5)	Redmond (0–1)		24,219	25–29	Box

June (15–13)

#	Date	Opponent	Score	Win	Loss	Save	Attendance	Record	Box
55	June 1	Blue Jays	4–3	**Erlin** (1–0)	Buehrle (2–4)	**Gregerson** (1)	40,403	26–29	Box
56	June 2	Blue Jays	4–7 (11)	Janssen (1–0)	**Boxberger** (0–1)	Loup (2)	20,384	26–30	Box
57	June 3	@ Dodgers	1–2	Fife (1–0)	**Stults** (4–5)	League (12)	37,055	26–31	Box
58	June 4	@ Dodgers	7–9	Howell (2–0)	**Ross** (0–2)	League (13)	37,544	26–32	Box
59	June 5	@ Dodgers	6–2	**Marquis** (7–2)	Kershaw (5–4)		40,040	27–32	Box
60	June 6	@ Rockies	6–5	**Gregerson** (4–2)	Corpas (0–1)	**Boxberger** (1)	29,840	28–32	Box
61	June 7	@ Rockies	9–10	Belisle (4–2)	**Thatcher** (2–1)		30,477	28–33	Box
62	June 8	@ Rockies	4–2	**Stults** (5–5)	Francis (2–4)	**Gregerson** (2)	34,590	29–33	Box
63	June 9	@ Rockies	7–8 (10)	Brothers (2–0)	**Ross** (0–3)		33,668	29–34	Box
64	June 10	Braves	7–6	**Marquis** (8–2)	Teherán (4–3)	**Thayer** (1)	21,192	30–34	Box
65	June 11	Braves	3–2	**Cashner** (5–3)	Hudson (4–6)	**Gregerson** (3)	22,330	31–34	Box
66	June 12	Braves	5–3	**Vólquez** (5–5)	Maholm (7–5)	**Vincent** (1)	22,316	32–34	Box
67	June 14	Diamondbacks	2–1	**Stults** (6–5)	Cahill (3–8)		23,364	33–34	Box
68	June 15	Diamondbacks	6–4	**Marquis** (9–2)	Miley (4–6)	**Street** (12)	29,756	34–34	Box
69	June 16	Diamondbacks	4–1	**Richard** (2–5)	Hernandez (2–4)	**Street** (13)	27,943	35–34	Box
70	June 17	@ Giants	5–3 (13)	**Vincent** (1–0)	Mijares (0–1)	**Street** (14)	41,981	36–34	Box
71	June 18	@ Giants	4–5	Machi (2–0)	**Thayer** (0–3)	Romo (17)	41,884	36–35	Box
72	June 19	@ Giants	2–4	Bumgarner (7–4)	**Gregerson** (4–3)	Romo (18)	41,866	36–36	Box
73	June 20	Dodgers	6–3	**Vincent** (2–0)	Guerrier (2–3)		30,656	37–36	Box
74	June 21	Dodgers	5–2	**Stauffer** (1–0)	Kershaw (5–5)	**Street** (15)	31,855	38–36	Box
75	June 22	Dodgers	1–6	Greinke (4–2)	**Vólquez** (5–6)		43,267	38–37	Box
76	June 23	Dodgers	1–3	League (3–3)	**Street** (0–4)	Jansen (4)	31,098	38–38	Box
77	June 24	Phillies	4–3 (10)	**Thatcher** (3–1)	De Fratus (2–1)		26,265	39–38	Box
78	June 25	Phillies	2–6	Kendrick (7–4)	**Marquis** (9–3)		24,695	39–39	Box
79	June 26	Phillies	5–7 (13)	Savery (1–0)	**Layne** (0–2)	Papelbon (15)	25,610	39–40	Box
80	June 28	@ Marlins	9–2	**Vólquez** (6–6)	Nolasco (4–8)		18,347	40–40	Box
81	June 29	@ Marlins	1–7	Turner (2–0)	**Stults** (6–6)		19,266	40–41	Box
82	June 30	@ Marlins	2–6	Cishek (2–4)	**Ross** (0–4)		15,929	40–42	Box

July (10–17)

#	Date	Opponent	Score	Win	Loss	Save	Attendance	Record	Box
83	July 1	@ Marlins	0–4	Fernández (5–4)	**Marquis** (9–4)	Cishek (15)	14,669	40–43	Box
84	July 2	@ Red Sox	1–4	Lackey (6–5)	**Erlin** (1–1)	Uehara (5)	36,498	40–44	Box
85	July 3	@ Red Sox	1–2	Uehara (2–0)	**Gregerson** (4–4)		36,911	40–45	Box
86	July 4	@ Red Sox	2–8	Webster (1–2)	**Stults** (6–7)		37,607	40–46	Box
87	July 5	@ Nationals	5–8	Gonzalez (6–3)	**Cashner** (5–4)	Soriano (23)	33,979	40–47	Box
88	July 6	@ Nationals	4–5	Ohlendorf (2–0)	**Vincent** (2–1)	Soriano (24)	33,314	40–48	Box
89	July 7	@ Nationals	7–11	Strasburg (5–6)	**Erlin** (1–2)		31,483	40–49	Box
90	July 8	Rockies	2–4	Chatwood (5–2)	**Vólquez** (6–7)	Betancourt (12)	20,400	40–50	Box
91	July 9	Rockies	2–1	**Stults** (7–7)	Chacín (8–4)		22,733	41–50	Box
92	July 10	Rockies	4–5	de la Rosa (9–5)	**Cashner** (5–5)	Betancourt (13)	19,411	41–51	Box
93	July 11	Giants	2–4	Bumgarner (10–5)	**Gregerson** (4–5)	Romo (21)	31,976	41–52	Box
94	July 12	Giants	1–10	Gaudin (3–1)	**O'Sullivan** (0–1)		42,361	41–53	Box
95	July 13	Giants	0–9	Lincecum (5–9)	**Vólquez** (6–8)		40,342	41–54	Box
96	July 14	Giants	10–1	**Stults** (8–7)	Zito (4–7)		33,243	42–54	Box
–	July 16	**2013 Major League Baseball All-Star Game at Citi Field in Queens, New York**							
97	July 19	@ Cardinals	6–9	Westbrook (6–4)	**Marquis** (9–5)	Mujica (27)	43,929	42–55	Box
98	July 20	@ Cardinals	5–3	**Vólquez** (7–8)	Lynn (11–5)	**Street** (16)	45,288	43–55	Box
99	July 21	@ Cardinals	2–3	Wainwright (13–5)	**Stults** (8–8)	Mujica (28)	44,033	43–56	Box
100	July 22	@ Brewers	5–3	**Cashner** (6–5)	Gorzelanny (1–4)	**Street** (17)	30,348	44–56	Box
101	July 23	@ Brewers	6–2	**Ross** (1–4)	Hand (0–2)		28,242	45–56	Box
102	July 24	@ Brewers	1–3	Lohse (7–7)	**O'Sullivan** (0–2)	Henderson (11)	25,551	45–57	Box
103	July 25	@ Brewers	10–8	**Vólquez** (8–8)	Gallardo (8–9)	**Street** (18)	34,372	46–57	Box
104	July 26	@ Diamondbacks	0–10	Delgado (3–3)	**Stults** (8–9)		22,279	46–58	Box
105	July 27	@ Diamondbacks	12–3	**Cashner** (7–5)	Skaggs (2–3)		30,033	47–58	Box
106	July 28	@ Diamondbacks	1–0	**Ross** (2–4)	Corbin (12–2)	**Street** (19)	24,864	48–58	Box
107	July 29	Reds	2–1	**Gregerson** (5–5)	Chapman (3–4)		24,050	49–58	Box
108	July 30	Reds	4–2	**Thayer** (1–3)	Parra (1–2)	**Street** (20)	29,207	50–58	Box
109	July 31	Reds	1–4	Bailey (6–10)	**Stults** (8–10)	Chapman (25)	26,450	50–59	Box

August (10–16)

#	Date	Opponent	Score	Win	Loss	Save	Attendance	Record	Box
110	August 2	Yankees	7–2	**Cashner** (8–5)	Sabathia (9–10)		44,124	51–59	Box
111	August 3	Yankees	0–3	Nova (5–4)	**Ross** (2–5)	Rivera (35)	44,184	51–60	Box
112	August 4	Yankees	6–3	**Kennedy** (4–8)	Hughes (4–10)	**Street** (21)	43,504	52–60	Box
113	August 6	Orioles	1–4	Norris (8–9)	**Vólquez** (8–9)	Johnson (39)	29,415	52–61	Box
114	August 7	Orioles	3–10	Rodríguez (2–1)	**Gregerson** (5–6)		21,206	52–62	Box
115	August 9	@ Reds	2–7	Arroyo (10–9)	**Cashner** (8–6)		30,288	52–63	Box
116	August 10	@ Reds	3–1	**Ross** (3–5)	Cingrani (5–2)	**Street** (22)	34,777	53–63	Box
117	August 11	@ Reds	2–3 (13)	LeCure (2–1)	**Stauffer** (1–1)		38,567	53–64	Box
118	August 12	@ Rockies	2–14	Chacín (11–6)	**Vólquez** (8–10)		30,986	53–65	Box
119	August 13	@ Rockies	7–5	**Stauffer** (2–1)	Manship (0–2)	**Street** (23)	30,366	54–65	Box
120	August 14	@ Rockies	2–4	de la Rosa (12–6)	**Cashner** (8–7)	Brothers (11)	30,099	54–66	Box
121	August 15	Mets	1–4	Atchison (3–1)	**Gregerson** (5–7)	Germen (1)	21,812	54–67	Box
122	August 16	Mets	2–5	Niese (5–6)	**Kennedy** (4–9)	Hawkins (4)	25,604	54–68	Box
123	August 17	Mets	8–2	**Vólquez** (9–10)	Aardsma (2–2)		36,974	55–68	Box
124	August 18	Mets	4–3	**Street** (1–4)	Feliciano (0–2)		24,704	56–68	Box
125	August 19	Pirates	1–3	Liriano (14–5)	**Cashner** (8–8)	Melancon (8)	24,850	56–69	Box
126	August 20	Pirates	1–8	Burnett (6–8)	**Ross** (3–6)		21,381	56–70	Box
127	August 21	Pirates	2–1	**Kennedy** (5–9)	Cole (6–6)	**Street** (24)	19,126	57–70	Box
128	August 23	Cubs	8–6	**Vincent** (3–1)	Russell (1–5)	**Street** (25)	23,561	58–70	Box
129	August 24	Cubs	2–3	Samardzija (8–11)	**Stults** (8–11)	Gregg (26)	30,870	58–71	Box
130	August 25	Cubs	3–2 (15)	**Thayer** (2–3)	Rondón (2–1)		22,762	59–71	Box
131	August 26	@ Diamondbacks	1–6	McCarthy (3–8)	**Ross** (3–7)		16,871	59–72	Box
132	August 27	@ Diamondbacks	9–10 (10)	Bell (5–2)	**Thayer** (2–4)		19,807	59–73	Box
133	August 28	@ Diamondbacks	5–1	**Erlin** (2–2)	Miley (9–9)		20,578	60–73	Box
134	August 30	@ Dodgers	2–9	Ryu (13–5)	**Stults** (8–12)		51,769	60–74	Box
135	August 31	@ Dodgers	1–2	Wilson (1–0)	**Vincent** (3–2)	Jansen (23)	53,121	60–75	Box

September (16-11)

#	Date	Opponent	Score	Win	Loss	Save	Attendance	Record	Box
136	September 1	@ Dodgers	1–2	Greinke (14–3)	**Thayer** (2–5)	Jansen (24)	52,168	60–76	Box
137	September 2	Giants	4–1	**Kennedy** (6–9)	Zito (4–11)	**Street** (26)	25,430	61–76	Box
138	September 3	Giants	3–2	**Stauffer** (3–1)	Dunning (0–2)	**Street** (27)	19,889	62–76	Box
139	September 4	Giants	5–13	Lincecum (9–13)	**Stults** (8–13)		15,762	62–77	Box
140	September 6	Rockies	4–3	**Street** (2–4)	Brothers (2–1)		21,476	63–77	Box
141	September 7	Rockies	2–1	**Gregerson** (6–7)	Belisle (5–6)	**Street** (28)	25,272	64–77	Box
142	September 8	Rockies	5–2	**Vincent** (4–2)	Oswalt (0–5)	**Street** (29)	18,656	65–77	Box
143	September 10	@ Phillies	8–2	**Cashner** (9–8)	Cloyd (2–4)		29,242	66–77	Box
144	September 11	@ Phillies	2–4	Lee (13–6)	**Vincent** (4–3)	Papelbon (26)	30,351	66–78	Box
145	September 12	@ Phillies	5–10	De Fratus (3–3)	**Ross** (3–8)		29,986	66–79	Box
146	September 13	@ Braves	4–3	**Vincent** (5–3)	Walden (4–3)	**Street** (30)	34,112	67–79	Box
147	September 14	@ Braves	1–2	Medlen (14–12)	**Erlin** (2–3)	Kimbrel (47)	40,153	67–80	Box
148	September 15	@ Braves	4–0	**Smith** (1–1)	Teherán (12–8)		36,125	68–80	Box
149	September 16	@ Pirates	2–0	**Cashner** (10–8)	Burnett (8–11)		20,633	69–80	Box
150	September 17	@ Pirates	5–2	**Stults** (9–13)	Jeff Locke (10–6)	**Gregerson** (4)	22,520	70–80	Box
151	September 18	@ Pirates	3–2	**Thayer** (3–5)	Melancon (2–2)	**Street** (31)	27,640	71–80	Box
152	September 19	@ Pirates	1–10	Cole (9–7)	**Kennedy** (6–10)		26,242	71–81	Box
153	September 20	Dodgers	2–0	**Erlin** (3–3)	Vólquez (9–12)	**Street** (32)	34,986	72–81	Box
154	September 21	Dodgers	0–4	Kershaw (15–9)	**Smith** (1–2)		40,572	72–82	Box
155	September 22	Dodgers	0–1	Howell (4–1)	**Cashner** (10–9)	Jansen (27)	32,988	72–83	Box
156	September 23	Diamondbacks	4–1	**Stults** (10–13)	McCarthy (5–10)	**Street** (33)	15,869	73–83	Box
157	September 24	Diamondbacks	1–2 (12)	Collmenter (5–4)	**Gregerson** (6–8)	Ziegler (12)	18,562	73–84	Box
158	September 25	Diamondbacks	12–2	**Kennedy** (7–10)	Delgado (5–7)		29,528	74–84	Box
159	September 26	Diamondbacks	3–2 (11)	**Vincent** (6–3)	Collmenter (5–5)		21,393	75–84	Box
160	September 27	@ Giants	3–7	Vogelsong (4–6)	**Smith** (1–3)		41,103	75–85	Box
161	September 28	@ Giants	9–3	**Stults** (11–13)	Petit (4–1)		41,201	76–85	Box
162	September 29	@ Giants	6–7	Romo (5–8)	**Street** (2–5)		41,495	76–86	Box

== Roster ==
2013 San Diego Padres
Roster
Pitchers: 45 Anthony Bass; 29 Brad Boxberger; 58 Brad Brach; 34 Andrew Cashner; 41 Robbie Erlin; 57 Luke Gregerson; 56 Colt Hynes; 22 Ian Kennedy; 40 Tom Layne; 21 Jason Marquis; 39 Miles Mikolas; 59 Sean O'Sullivan; 33 Clayton Richard; 38 Tyson Ross; 26 Burch Smith; 46 Tim Stauffer; 16 Huston Street; 53 Eric Stults; 54 Joe Thatcher; 55 Dale Thayer; 50 Nick Vincent; 37 Edinson Vólquez; 56 Thad Weber	Catchers: 8 John Baker; 12 Yasmani Grandal; 4 Nick Hundley; 44 René Rivera; 8 Chris Robinson; Infielders: 23 Yonder Alonso; 2 Everth Cabrera; 3 Ronny Cedeño; 3 Pedro Ciriaco; 11 Logan Forsythe; 15 Jesús Guzmán; 9 Jedd Gyorko; 7 Chase Headley; 54 Tommy Medica; 1 Cody Ransom	Outfielders: 5 Alexi Amarista; 88 Kyle Blanks; 1 Jaff Decker; 13 Chris Denorfia; 27 Reymond Fuentes; 14 Mark Kotsay; 24 Cameron Maybin; 18 Carlos Quentin; 25 Will Venable	Manager: 20 Bud Black; Coaches: 36 Darren Balsley (pitching); 81 Griffin Benedict (bullpen catcher); 47 Willie Blair (bullpen); 80 Justin Hatcher (bullpen catcher); 30 Glenn Hoffman (third base); 28 Phil Plantier (hitting); 32 Alonzo Powell (assistant hitting); 17 Rick Renteria (bench); 10 Dave Roberts (first base)

== Player stats ==
=== Batting ===
Note: G = Games played; AB = At bats; R = Runs; H = Hits; 2B = Doubles; 3B = Triples; HR = Home runs; RBI = Runs batted in; SB = Stolen bases; BB = Walks; AVG = Batting average; SLG = Slugging average

Player	G	AB	R	H	2B	3B	HR	RBI	SB	BB	AVG	SLG
Chase Headley	141	520	59	130	35	2	13	50	8	67	.250	.400
Jedd Gyorko	125	486	62	121	26	0	23	63	1	33	.249	.444
Will Venable	151	481	64	129	22	8	22	53	22	29	.268	.484
Chris Denorfia	144	473	67	132	21	2	10	47	11	42	.279	.395
Everth Cabrera	95	381	54	108	15	5	4	31	37	41	.283	.381
Nick Hundley	114	373	35	87	19	0	13	44	1	26	.233	.389
Alexi Amarista	146	368	35	87	14	4	5	32	4	22	.236	.337
Yonder Alonso	97	334	34	94	11	0	6	45	6	32	.281	.368
Jesús Guzmán	126	288	33	65	17	0	9	35	3	27	.226	.378
Kyle Blanks	88	280	31	68	14	0	8	35	1	21	.243	.379
Carlos Quentin	82	276	42	76	21	0	13	44	0	31	.275	.493
Logan Forsythe	75	220	22	47	6	1	6	19	6	19	.214	.332
Mark Kotsay	104	155	8	30	2	0	1	12	0	13	.194	.226
Ronny Cedeño	38	123	12	33	2	2	2	9	3	8	.268	.366
Yasmani Grandal	28	88	13	19	8	0	1	9	0	18	.216	.341
Tommy Medica	19	69	9	20	2	0	3	10	0	10	.290	.449
René Rivera	23	67	4	17	3	1	0	7	0	2	.254	.328
Pedro Ciriaco	23	63	5	15	1	1	1	4	6	3	.238	.333
Cameron Maybin	14	51	7	8	1	0	1	5	4	4	.157	.235
John Baker	16	40	0	6	0	0	0	2	0	6	.150	.150
Rey Fuentes	23	33	4	5	0	0	0	1	3	3	.152	.152
Jaff Decker	13	26	3	4	0	0	1	2	0	3	.154	.269
Chris Robinson	8	12	1	2	0	0	1	3	0	0	.167	.417
Cody Ransom	5	11	0	0	0	0	0	0	0	0	.000	.000
Pitcher totals	162	299	14	46	6	0	3	16	2	7	.154	.204
Team totals	162	5517	618	1349	246	26	146	578	118	467	.245	.378

=== Pitching ===
Note: W = Wins; L = Losses; ERA = Earned run average; G = Games pitched; GS = Games started; SV = Saves; IP = Innings pitched; H = Hits allowed; R = Runs allowed; ER = Earned runs allowed; BB = Walks allowed; SO = Strikeouts

Player	W	L	ERA	G	GS	SV	IP	H	R	ER	BB	SO
Eric Stults	11	13	3.93	33	33	0	203.2	219	97	89	40	131
Andrew Cashner	10	9	3.09	31	26	0	175.0	151	68	60	47	128
Edinson Vólquez	9	10	6.01	27	27	0	142.1	168	100	95	69	116
Tyson Ross	3	8	3.17	35	16	0	125.0	100	51	44	44	119
Jason Marquis	9	5	4.05	20	20	0	117.2	111	61	53	68	72
Tim Stauffer	3	1	3.75	43	0	0	69.2	59	29	29	20	64
Luke Gregerson	6	8	2.71	73	0	4	66.1	49	24	20	18	64
Dale Thayer	3	5	3.32	69	0	1	65.0	59	25	24	22	64
Ian Kennedy	4	2	4.24	10	10	0	57.1	52	29	27	25	55
Huston Street	2	5	2.70	58	0	33	56.2	44	17	17	14	46
Robbie Erlin	3	3	4.12	11	9	0	54.2	53	26	25	15	40
Clayton Richard	2	5	7.01	12	11	0	52.2	65	44	41	21	24
Nick Vincent	6	3	2.14	45	0	1	46.1	33	11	11	11	49
Anthony Bass	0	0	5.36	24	0	0	42.0	51	26	25	20	31
Burch Smith	1	3	6.44	10	7	0	36.1	39	26	26	21	46
Brad Brach	1	0	3.19	33	0	0	31.0	36	15	11	19	31
Joe Thatcher	3	1	2.10	50	0	0	30.0	28	7	7	4	29
Sean O'Sullivan	0	2	3.96	7	3	0	25.0	31	12	11	14	12
Brad Boxberger	0	1	2.86	18	0	1	22.0	19	9	7	13	24
Colt Hynes	0	0	9.00	22	0	0	17.0	25	17	17	9	13
Thad Weber	0	0	2.00	3	0	0	9.0	5	2	2	5	6
Tommy Layne	0	2	2.08	14	0	0	8.2	10	4	2	5	6
Miles Mikolas	0	0	0.00	2	0	0	1.2	0	0	0	1	1
Team totals	76	86	3.98	162	162	40	1455.0	1407	700	643	525	1171

== Farm system ==
Level	Team	League	Manager
AAA	Tucson Padres	Pacific Coast League	Pat Murphy
AA	San Antonio Missions	Texas League	Rich Dauer
A	Lake Elsinore Storm	California League	Shawn Wooten
A	Fort Wayne TinCaps	Midwest League	José Valentín
A-Short Season	Eugene Emeralds	Northwest League	Jim Gabella
Rookie	AZL Padres	Arizona League	Michael Collins

LEAGUE CHAMPIONS: San Antonio
