= 2013 Colorado Rockies season =

2013 Colorado Rockies
- League: National League
- Division: West
- Ballpark: Coors Field
- City: Denver, Colorado
- Record: 74–88 (.457)
- Divisional place: 5th
- Owners: Charles & Richard Monfort
- General manager: Dan O'Dowd
- Manager: Walt Weiss
- Television: Root Sports Rocky Mountain (Drew Goodman, George Frazier, Jeff Huson)
- Radio: KOA (English) (Jack Corrigan, Jerry Schemmel); KNRV (Spanish) (Tony Guevara)
- Stats: ESPN.com; Baseball Reference

The 2013 Colorado Rockies season was the franchise's 21st in Major League Baseball. The season marked the Rockies' 18th season of playing their home games at Coors Field. It was Todd Helton's 17th and final season with the Rockies and Walt Weiss' first season as manager.

== Offseason ==
- November 20, 2012: Matt Reynolds was traded by the Colorado Rockies to the Arizona Diamondbacks for Ryan Wheeler.
- December 4, 2012: Alex White was traded by the Colorado Rockies with Alex Gillingham (minors) to the Houston Astros for Wilton López and a player to be named later. The Houston Astros sent Jose Monzon (minors) (May 1, 2013) to the Colorado Rockies to complete the trade.
- January 24, 2013: Yorvit Torrealba was signed as a free agent by the Colorado Rockies.
- March 24, 2013: Jon Garland was signed a free agent by the Colorado Rockies.

== Regular season ==
=== Season standings ===
==== National League West ====
NL West
| Team | W | L | Pct. | GB | Home | Road |
|---|---|---|---|---|---|---|
| Los Angeles Dodgers | 92 | 70 | .568 | — | 47‍–‍34 | 45‍–‍36 |
| Arizona Diamondbacks | 81 | 81 | .500 | 11 | 45‍–‍36 | 36‍–‍45 |
| San Diego Padres | 76 | 86 | .469 | 16 | 45‍–‍36 | 31‍–‍50 |
| San Francisco Giants | 76 | 86 | .469 | 16 | 42‍–‍40 | 34‍–‍46 |
| Colorado Rockies | 74 | 88 | .457 | 18 | 45‍–‍36 | 29‍–‍52 |

==== National League Wild Card ====
Division winners
| Team | W | L | Pct. |
|---|---|---|---|
| St. Louis Cardinals | 97 | 65 | .599 |
| Atlanta Braves | 96 | 66 | .593 |
| Los Angeles Dodgers | 92 | 70 | .568 |

Wild Card teams (Top 2 teams qualify for postseason)
| Team | W | L | Pct. | GB |
|---|---|---|---|---|
| Pittsburgh Pirates | 94 | 68 | .580 | +4 |
| Cincinnati Reds | 90 | 72 | .556 | — |
| Washington Nationals | 86 | 76 | .531 | 4 |
| Arizona Diamondbacks | 81 | 81 | .500 | 9 |
| San Francisco Giants | 76 | 86 | .469 | 14 |
| San Diego Padres | 76 | 86 | .469 | 14 |
| Colorado Rockies | 74 | 88 | .457 | 16 |
| New York Mets | 74 | 88 | .457 | 16 |
| Milwaukee Brewers | 74 | 88 | .457 | 16 |
| Philadelphia Phillies | 73 | 89 | .451 | 17 |
| Chicago Cubs | 66 | 96 | .407 | 24 |
| Miami Marlins | 62 | 100 | .383 | 28 |

=== Record vs. opponents ===
2013 National League record Source: MLB Standings Grid – 2013
| Team | AZ | ATL | CHC | CIN | COL | LAD | MIA | MIL | NYM | PHI | PIT | SD | SF | STL | WSH | AL |
|---|---|---|---|---|---|---|---|---|---|---|---|---|---|---|---|---|
| Arizona | — | 2–4 | 4–3 | 3–4 | 12–7 | 10–9 | 4–2 | 6–1 | 3–4 | 3–4 | 3–3 | 7–12 | 7–12 | 4–3 | 2–4 | 11–9 |
| Atlanta | 4–2 | — | 5–1 | 4–3 | 6–1 | 5–2 | 13–6 | 2–4 | 10–9 | 11–8 | 4–3 | 1–5 | 3–4 | 4–3 | 13–6 | 11–9 |
| Chicago | 3–4 | 1–5 | — | 5–14 | 3–3 | 1–6 | 4–3 | 6–13 | 3–3 | 3–3 | 7–12 | 3–4 | 4–3 | 7–12 | 3–4 | 13–7 |
| Cincinnati | 4–3 | 3–4 | 14–5 | — | 2–4 | 4–3 | 6–1 | 10–9 | 4–2 | 4–2 | 8–11 | 3–3 | 6–1 | 8–11 | 3–4 | 11–9 |
| Colorado | 7–12 | 1–6 | 3–3 | 4–2 | — | 10–9 | 3–4 | 4–2 | 3–4 | 3–4 | 4–2 | 12–7 | 9–10 | 3–4 | 3–4 | 5–15 |
| Los Angeles | 9–10 | 2–5 | 6–1 | 3–4 | 9–10 | — | 5–2 | 4–2 | 5–1 | 5–2 | 4–2 | 11–8 | 8–11 | 4–3 | 5–1 | 12–8 |
| Miami | 2–4 | 6–13 | 3–4 | 1–6 | 4–3 | 2–5 | — | 1–5 | 11–8 | 7–12 | 2–4 | 3–4 | 4–3 | 2–4 | 5–14 | 9–11 |
| Milwaukee | 1–6 | 4–2 | 13–6 | 9–10 | 2–4 | 2–4 | 5–1 | — | 4–3 | 5–2 | 7–12 | 3–4 | 5–2 | 5–14 | 3–4 | 6–14 |
| New York | 4–3 | 9–10 | 3–3 | 2–4 | 4–3 | 1–5 | 8–11 | 3–4 | — | 10–9 | 2–5 | 4–3 | 4–2 | 2–5 | 7–12 | 11–9 |
| Philadelphia | 4–3 | 8–11 | 3–3 | 2–4 | 4–3 | 2–5 | 12–7 | 2–5 | 9–10 | — | 3–4 | 4–2 | 3–3 | 2–5 | 8–11 | 7–13 |
| Pittsburgh | 3–3 | 3–4 | 12–7 | 11–8 | 2–4 | 2–4 | 4–2 | 12–7 | 5–2 | 4–3 | — | 3–4 | 4–3 | 10–9 | 4–3 | 15–5 |
| San Diego | 12–7 | 5–1 | 4–3 | 3–3 | 7–12 | 8–11 | 4–3 | 4–3 | 3–4 | 2–4 | 4–3 | — | 8–11 | 2–4 | 2–5 | 8–12 |
| San Francisco | 12–7 | 4–3 | 3–4 | 1–6 | 10–9 | 11–8 | 3–4 | 2–5 | 2–4 | 3–3 | 3–4 | 11–8 | — | 2–4 | 3–3 | 6–14 |
| St. Louis | 3–4 | 3–4 | 12–7 | 11–8 | 4–3 | 3–4 | 4–2 | 14–5 | 5–2 | 5–2 | 9–10 | 4–2 | 4–2 | — | 6–0 | 10–10 |
| Washington | 4–2 | 6–13 | 4–3 | 4–3 | 4–3 | 1–5 | 14–5 | 4–3 | 12–7 | 11–8 | 3–4 | 5–2 | 3–3 | 0–6 | — | 11–9 |

=== Transactions ===
- May 1, 2013: Chris Nelson was traded by the Colorado Rockies to the New York Yankees for a player to be named later. The New York Yankees sent Yoely Bello (minors) (September 11, 2013) to the Colorado Rockies to complete the trade.
- May 2, 2013: Roy Oswalt was signed as a free agent by the Colorado Rockies.
- June 10, 2013: Jon Garland was released by the Colorado Rockies.
- June 18, 2013: Eric Young, Jr. was traded by the Colorado Rockies to the New York Mets for Collin McHugh.
- July 9, 2013: Mitchell Boggs was purchased by the Colorado Rockies from the St. Louis Cardinals.

=== Major League Debuts ===
- Batters
  - Nolan Arenado (Apr 28)
  - Corey Dickerson (Jun 22)
- Pitchers
  - Chad Bettis (Aug 1)

=== Roster ===
2013 Colorado Rockies
**Roster**
| **Pitchers**: 34 Matt Belisle; 63 Rafael Betancourt; 35 Chad Bettis; 41 Mitchell Boggs; 49 Rex Brothers; 45 Jhoulys Chacín; 32 Tyler Chatwood; 60 Manuel Corpas; 29 Jorge de la Rosa; 61 Edgmer Escalona; 26 Jeff Francis; 27 Jon Garland; 56 Logan Kensing; 59 Wilton López; 50 Jeff Manship; 43 Collin McHugh; 44,12 Juan Nicasio; 44 Roy Oswalt; 0 Adam Ottavino; 88 Josh Outman; 13 Drew Pomeranz; 62 Rob Scahill; 31 Chris Volstad | **Catchers**: 20 Wilin Rosario; 8 Yorvit Torrealba; **Infielders**: 28 Nolan Arenado; 16 Reid Brignac; 17 Todd Helton; 18 Jonathan Herrera; 9 DJ LeMahieu; 4 Chris Nelson; 15 Jordan Pacheco; 14 Josh Rutledge; 2 Troy Tulowitzki; 12,4 Ryan Wheeler; **Outfielders**: 19 Charlie Blackmon; 21 Tyler Colvin; 3 Michael Cuddyer; 23 Charlie Culberson; 6 Corey Dickerson; 24 Dexter Fowler; 5 Carlos González; 1 Eric Young, Jr. | **Manager**: 22 Walt Weiss; **Coaches**: 10 Dante Bichette (hitting); 9 Vinny Castilla (special asst.); 39 Stu Cole (third base); 38 Rene Lachemann (first base); 40 Bo McLaughlin (bullpen); 11 Tom Runnells (bench); 58 Jerry Weinstein (catching); 52 Jim Wright (pitching) |

=== Game log ===
Legend
| | Rockies win |
| | Rockies loss |
| | Postponement |
| **Bold** | Rockies team member |

2013 Game Log
April (16–11)

| # | Date | Opponent | Score | Win | Loss | Save | Attendance | Record |
|---|---|---|---|---|---|---|---|---|
| 1 | April 1 | @ Brewers | 5–4 (10) | Henderson (1–0) | **Ottavino** (0–1) | | 45,781 | 0–1 |
| 2 | April 2 | @ Brewers | 8–4 | **Escalona** (1–0) | Gonzalez (0–1) | **Betancourt** (1) | 24,753 | 1–1 |
| 3 | April 3 | @ Brewers | 7–3 | **Nicasio** (1–0) | Peralta (0–1) | | 25,766 | 2–1 |
| 4 | April 5 | Padres | 5–2 | **Francis** (1–0) | Marquis (0–1) | **Betancourt** (2) | 49,077 | 3–1 |
| 5 | April 6 | Padres | 6–3 | **Garland** (1–0) | Ross (0–1) | **Betancourt** (3) | 31,133 | 4–1 |
| 6 | April 7 | Padres | 9–1 | **Chacín** (1–0) | Vólquez (0–2) | | 31,060 | 5–1 |
| 7 | April 8 | @ Giants | 4–2 | Bumgarner (2–0) | **de la Rosa** (0–1) | Romo (4) | 41,133 | 5–2 |
| 8 | April 9 | @ Giants | 9–6 | Casilla (1–0) | **Belisle** (0–1) | Romo (5) | 41,910 | 5–3 |
| 9 | April 10 | @ Giants | 10–0 | Zito (2–0) | **Francis** (1–1) | | 41,606 | 5–4 |
| 10 | April 12 | @ Padres | 7–5 | **Brothers** (1–0) | Street (0–1) | **Betancourt** (4) | 21,814 | 6–4 |
| 11 | April 13 | @ Padres | 9–5 | **Chacín** (2–0) | Vólquez (0–3) | | 29,523 | 7–4 |
| 12 | April 14 | @ Padres | 2–1 | **de la Rosa** (1–1) | Thayer (0–1) | **Betancourt** (5) | 21,337 | 8–4 |
| – | April 15 | Mets | Postponed (snow) Rescheduled for April 16 | | | | | |
| 13 | April 16 | Mets | 8–4 | **Nicasio** (2–0) | Gee (0–3) | | 21,510 | 9–4 |
| 14 | April 16 | Mets | 9–8 (10) | **Betancourt** (1–0) | Burke (0–1) | | 20,239 | 10–4 |
| – | April 17 | Mets | Postponed (snow) Rescheduled for June 27 | | | | | |
| 15 | April 18 | Mets | 11–3 | **Garland** (2–0) | Niese (2–1) | | 18,341 | 11–4 |
| 16 | April 19 | Diamondbacks | 3–1 | **Chacín** (3–0) | Kennedy (1–2) | **Betancourt** (6) | 23,445 | 12–4 |
| 17 | April 20 | Diamondbacks | 4–3 | **de la Rosa** (2–1) | Cahill (0–3) | **Betancourt** (7) | 30,380 | 13–4 |
| 18 | April 21 | Diamondbacks | 5–4 | Bell (2–0) | **López** (0–1) | Putz (3) | 42,507 | 13–5 |
| – | April 22 | Braves | Postponed (snow) Rescheduled for April 23 | | | | | |
| 19 | April 23 | Braves | 4–3 | Minor (3–1) | **Francis** (1–2) | Kimbrel (8) | 19,124 | 13–6 |
| 20 | April 23 | Braves | 10–2 | Teherán (1–0) | **Garland** (2–1) | | 21,724 | 13–7 |
| 21 | April 24 | Braves | 6–5 (12) | **Belisle** (1–1) | Ayala (1–1) | | 35,234 | 14–7 |
| 22 | April 25 | @ Diamondbacks | 3–2 | Cahill (1–3) | **de la Rosa** (2–2) | Putz (4) | 24,532 | 14–8 |
| 23 | April 26 | @ Diamondbacks | 6–3 | **Nicasio** (3–0) | McCarthy (0–3) | **Betancourt** (8) | 28,801 | 15–8 |
| 24 | April 27 | @ Diamondbacks | 3–2 (10) | Putz (2–0) | **Escalona** (1–1) | | 31,019 | 15–9 |
| 25 | April 28 | @ Diamondbacks | 4–2 | Corbin (3–0) | **Garland** (2–2) | Putz (5) | 24,852 | 15–10 |
| 26 | April 29 | @ Dodgers | 12–2 | **Chatwood** (1–0) | Lilly (0–1) | | 31,570 | 16–10 |
| 27 | April 30 | @ Dodgers | 6–2 | Ryu (3–1) | **de la Rosa** (2–3) | | 47,602 | 16–11 |

May (12–16)

| # | Date | Opponent | Score | Win | Loss | Save | Attendance | Record |
|---|---|---|---|---|---|---|---|---|
| 28 | May 1 | @ Dodgers | 7–3 | **Outman** (1–0) | Beckett (0–4) | | 32,848 | 17–11 |
| 29 | May 3 | Rays | 7–4 (10) | Farnsworth (1–0) | **Belisle** (1–2) | Rodney (4) | 30,255 | 17–12 |
| 30 | May 4 | Rays | 9–3 | **Garland** (3–2) | Price (1–3) | | 29,099 | 18–12 |
| 31 | May 5 | Rays | 8–3 | Cobb (4–2) | **Chacín** (3–1) | | 39,220 | 18–13 |
| 32 | May 7 | Yankees | 2–0 | **de la Rosa** (3–3) | Kuroda (4–2) | **Betancourt** (9) | 41,595 | 19–13 |
| 33 | May 8 | Yankees | 3–2 | Robertson (2–0) | **Betancourt** (1–1) | Rivera (12) | 40,148 | 19–14 |
| 34 | May 9 | Yankees | 3–1 | Warren (1–0) | **Francis** (1–3) | Rivera (13) | 40,972 | 19–15 |
| 35 | May 10 | @ Cardinals | 3–0 | Miller (5–2) | **Garland** (3–3) | | 37,800 | 19–16 |
| 36 | May 11 | @ Cardinals | 3–0 | Wainwright (5–2) | **Chacín** (3–2) | | 43,050 | 19–17 |
| 37 | May 12 | @ Cardinals | 8–2 | **de la Rosa** (4–3) | García (4–2) | | 40,881 | 20–17 |
| 38 | May 13 | @ Cubs | 9–1 | Wood (4–2) | **Nicasio** (3–1) | | 35,080 | 20–18 |
| 39 | May 14 | @ Cubs | 9–4 | **Francis** (2–3) | Villanueva (1–3) | | 38,123 | 21–18 |
| 40 | May 15 | @ Cubs | 6–3 | Samardzija (2–5) | **Garland** (3–4) | | 38,083 | 21–19 |
| 41 | May 16 | Giants | 8–6 | Cain (3–2) | **Chacín** (3–3) | Romo (13) | 33,128 | 21–20 |
| 42 | May 17 | Giants | 10–9 | **de la Rosa** (5–3) | Bumgarner (4–2) | **Betancourt** (10) | 43,365 | 22–20 |
| 43 | May 18 | Giants | 10–2 | **Chatwood** (2–0) | Lincecum (3–3) | | 41,412 | 23–20 |
| 44 | May 19 | Giants | 5–0 | **Nicasio** (4–1) | Zito (3–3) | | 47,494 | 24–20 |
| 45 | May 20 | Diamondbacks | 5–1 | Corbin (7–0) | **Garland** (3–5) | | 23,053 | 24–21 |
| 46 | May 21 | Diamondbacks | 5–4 (10) | **López** (1–1) | Reynolds (0–2) | | 27,096 | 25–21 |
| 47 | May 22 | Diamondbacks | 4–1 | **de la Rosa** (6–3) | Cahill (3–5) | **Brothers** (1) | 31,763 | 26–21 |
| 48 | May 24 | @ Giants | 5–0 | **Chatwood** (3–0) | Lincecum (3–4) | | 41,881 | 27–21 |
| 49 | May 25 | @ Giants | 6–5 (10) | Romo (3–2) | **Betancourt** (1–2) | | 41,784 | 27–22 |
| 50 | May 26 | @ Giants | 7–3 | Cain (4–2) | **Garland** (3–6) | | 42,597 | 27–23 |
| 51 | May 27 | @ Astros | 3–2 (12) | Clemens (2–2) | **López** (1–2) | | 16,044 | 27–24 |
| 52 | May 28 | @ Astros | 2–1 | **Belisle** (2–2) | Veras (0–4) | **Betancourt** (11) | 11,974 | 28–24 |
| 53 | May 29 | Astros | 6–3 | Clemens (3–2) | **Escalona** (1–2) | | 26,881 | 28–25 |
| 54 | May 30 | Astros | 7–5 | Harrell (4–6) | **Nicasio** (4–2) | Ambriz (1) | 26,239 | 28–26 |
| 55 | May 31 | Dodgers | 7–5 (10) | League (1–2) | **Betancourt** (1–3) | Belisario (1) | 37,923 | 28–27 |

June (13–15)

| # | Date | Opponent | Score | Win | Loss | Save | Attendance | Record |
|---|---|---|---|---|---|---|---|---|
| 56 | June 1 | Dodgers | 7–6 (10) | **Belisle** (3–2) | Guerrier (1–2) | | 36,703 | 29–27 |
| 57 | June 2 | Dodgers | 7–2 | **de la Rosa** (7–3) | Magill (0–1) | | 41,536 | 30–27 |
| 58 | June 3 | @ Reds | 3–0 | Arroyo (6–5) | **Chatwood** (3–1) | Chapman (15) | 18,498 | 30–28 |
| 59 | June 4 | @ Reds | 5–4 | **Outman** (2–0) | LeCure (1–1) | **Brothers** (2) | 27,031 | 31–28 |
| 60 | June 5 | @ Reds | 12–4 | **Garland** (4–6) | Villarreal (0–1) | | 26,665 | 32–28 |
| 61 | June 6 | Padres | 6–5 (12) | Gregerson (4–2) | **Corpas** (0–1) | Boxberger (1) | 29,840 | 32–29 |
| 62 | June 7 | Padres | 10–9 | **Belisle** (4–2) | Thatcher (2–1) | | 30,477 | 33–29 |
| 63 | June 8 | Padres | 4–2 | Stults (5–5) | **Francis** (2–4) | Gregerson (2) | 34,590 | 33–30 |
| 64 | June 9 | Padres | 8–7 (10) | **Brothers** (2–0) | Ross (0–3) | | 33,668 | 34–30 |
| 65 | June 11 | Nationals | 8–3 | **Chacín** (4–3) | Haren (4–8) | | 33,736 | 35–30 |
| 66 | June 12 | Nationals | 5–1 | Ohlendorf (1–0) | **de la Rosa** (7–4) | | 30,304 | 35–31 |
| 67 | June 13 | Nationals | 5–4 | Stammen (4–2) | **Belisle** (4–3) | Soriano (17) | 37,017 | 35–32 |
| 68 | June 14 | Phillies | 8–7 | Stutes (2–0) | **López** (1–3) | Papelbon (13) | 36,114 | 35–33 |
| 69 | June 15 | Phillies | 10–5 | **Chatwood** (4–1) | Pettibone (3–3) | | 35,516 | 36–33 |
| 70 | June 16 | Phillies | 5–2 | **Chacín** (5–3) | Hamels (2–10) | **Brothers** (3) | 45,186 | 37–33 |
| 71 | June 17 | @ Blue Jays | 2–0 | Cecil (3–0) | **Belisle** (4–4) | Janssen (15) | 20,946 | 37–34 |
| 72 | June 18 | @ Blue Jays | 8–3 | Rogers (3–2) | **Francis** (2–5) | | 22,852 | 37–35 |
| 73 | June 19 | @ Blue Jays | 5–2 | Buehrle (4–4) | **Nicasio** (4–3) | Janssen (16) | 27,235 | 37–36 |
| 74 | June 20 | @ Nationals | 5–1 | Zimmermann (10–3) | **Oswalt** (0–1) | | 31,927 | 37–37 |
| 75 | June 21 | @ Nationals | 2–1 | Strasburg (4–6) | **Corpas** (0–2) | Soriano (19) | 34,917 | 37–38 |
| 76 | June 22 | @ Nationals | 7–1 | **Chacín** (6–3) | Haren (4–9) | | 35,787 | 38–38 |
| 77 | June 23 | @ Nationals | 7–6 | **de la Rosa** (8–4) | Detwiler (2–6) | **Brothers** (4) | 39,307 | 39–38 |
| 78 | June 25 | @ Red Sox | 11–4 | Dempster (5–8) | **Nicasio** (4–4) | | 36,286 | 39–39 |
| 79 | June 26 | @ Red Sox | 5–3 | Lackey (5–5) | **Oswalt** (0–2) | Uehara (2) | 34,632 | 39–40 |
| 80 | June 27 | Mets | 3–2 | Hawkins (3–1) | **Belisle** (4–5) | Parnell (14) | 34,387 | 39–41 |
| 81 | June 28 | Giants | 4–1 | **Chacín** (7–3) | Zito (4–6) | | 38,428 | 40–41 |
| 82 | June 29 | Giants | 2–1 | **Betancourt** (2–3) | Affeldt (1–4) | | 44,612 | 41–41 |
| 83 | June 30 | Giants | 5–2 | Bumgarner (8–5) | **Pomeranz** (0–1) | Romo (19) | 41,845 | 41–42 |

July (10–16)

| # | Date | Opponent | Score | Win | Loss | Save | Attendance | Record |
|---|---|---|---|---|---|---|---|---|
| 84 | July 2 | Dodgers | 8–0 | Kershaw (7–5) | **Oswalt** (0–3) | | 37,419 | 41–43 |
| 85 | July 3 | Dodgers | 10–8 | Greinke (6–2) | **Chatwood** (4–2) | Jansen (8) | 48,628 | 41–44 |
| 86 | July 4 | Dodgers | 9–5 | **Chacín** (8–3) | Capuano (2–6) | | 48,794 | 42–44 |
| 87 | July 5 | @ Diamondbacks | 5–0 | Skaggs (2–1) | **de la Rosa** (8–5) | | 45,505 | 42–45 |
| 88 | July 6 | @ Diamondbacks | 11–1 | Miley (5–7) | **Pomeranz** (0–2) | | 22,395 | 42–46 |
| 89 | July 7 | @ Diamondbacks | 6–1 | Corbin (10–1) | **Oswalt** (0–4) | | 22,090 | 42–47 |
| 90 | July 8 | @ Padres | 4–2 | **Chatwood** (5–2) | Vólquez (6–7) | **Betancourt** (12) | 20,400 | 43–47 |
| 91 | July 9 | @ Padres | 2–1 | Stults (7–7) | **Chacín** (8–4) | | 22,733 | 43–48 |
| 92 | July 10 | @ Padres | 5–4 | **de la Rosa** (9–5) | Cashner (5–5) | **Betancourt** (13) | 19,411 | 44–48 |
| 93 | July 11 | @ Dodgers | 6–1 | Capuano (3–6) | **Pomeranz** (0–3) | | 52,740 | 44–49 |
| 94 | July 12 | @ Dodgers | 3–0 | **Nicasio** (5–4) | Kershaw (8–6) | **Betancourt** (14) | 50,796 | 45–49 |
| 95 | July 13 | @ Dodgers | 1–0 | Greinke (8–2) | **Chatwood** (5–3) | | 51,992 | 45–50 |
| 96 | July 14 | @ Dodgers | 3–1 | **Chacín** (9–4) | Nolasco (6–9) | **Betancourt** (15) | 51,402 | 46–50 |
| 97 | July 19 | Cubs | 3–1 | Samardzija (6–9) | **Escalona** (1–3) | Gregg (18) | 43,976 | 46–51 |
| 98 | July 20 | Cubs | 9–3 | **Nicasio** (6–4) | Villanueva (2–6) | | 45,616 | 47–51 |
| 99 | July 21 | Cubs | 4–3 | **Chatwood** (6–3) | Jackson (6–11) | **Brothers** (5) | 43,108 | 48–51 |
| 100 | July 22 | Marlins | 3–1 | Koehler (2–5) | **Pomeranz** (0–4) | Cishek (18) | 31,913 | 48–52 |
| 101 | July 23 | Marlins | 4–2 | Fernández (6–5) | **Chacín** (9–5) | Cishek (19) | 34,223 | 48–53 |
| 102 | July 24 | Marlins | 2–1 | **de la Rosa** (10–5) | Turner (3–3) | **Brothers** (6) | 30,900 | 49–53 |
| 103 | July 25 | Marlins | 5–3 | Jennings (1–1) | **Ottavino** (0–2) | Cishek (20) | 33,165 | 49–54 |
| 104 | July 26 | Brewers | 8–3 | **Chatwood** (7–3) | Peralta (7–10) | | 32,740 | 50–54 |
| 105 | July 27 | Brewers | 7–5 | Gorzelanny (2–4) | **McHugh** (0–2) | Henderson (12) | 38,012 | 50–55 |
| 106 | July 28 | Brewers | 6–5 | **Belisle** (5–5) | Axford (4–4) | **Brothers** (7) | 33,237 | 51–55 |
| 107 | July 29 | @ Braves | 9–8 (10) | Downs (3–3) | **Escalona** (1–4) | | 31,218 | 51–56 |
| 108 | July 30 | @ Braves | 11–3 | Wood (1–2) | **Nicasio** (6–5) | | 28,107 | 51–57 |
| 109 | July 31 | @ Braves | 9–0 | Minor (11–5) | **Chatwood** (7–4) | | 22,097 | 51–58 |

August (13–15)

| # | Date | Opponent | Score | Win | Loss | Save | Attendance | Record |
|---|---|---|---|---|---|---|---|---|
| 110 | August 1 | @ Braves | 11–2 | Teherán (8–5) | **Bettis** (0–1) | | 30,069 | 51–59 |
| 111 | August 2 | @ Pirates | 4–2 | **Chacín** (10–5) | Cole (5–5) | **Brothers** (8) | 37,487 | 52–59 |
| 112 | August 3 | @ Pirates | 5–2 | Liriano (12–4) | **de la Rosa** (10–6) | Melancon (6) | 38,424 | 52–60 |
| 113 | August 4 | @ Pirates | 5–1 | Burnett (5–7) | **Nicasio** (6–6) | | 37,980 | 52–61 |
| 114 | August 6 | @ Mets | 3–2 | Atchison (2–0) | **López** (1–4) | Hawkins (1) | 27,198 | 52–62 |
| 115 | August 7 | @ Mets | 5–0 | Harvey (9–3) | **Chacín** (10–6) | | 27,581 | 52–63 |
| 116 | August 8 | @ Mets | 2–1 | Gee (8–8) | **Manship** (0–1) | Hawkins (2) | 26,618 | 52–64 |
| 117 | August 9 | Pirates | 10–1 | **de la Rosa** (11–6) | Liriano (12–5) | | 37,444 | 53–64 |
| 118 | August 10 | Pirates | 6–4 | **López** (2–4) | Burnett (5–8) | **Brothers** (9) | 40,728 | 54–64 |
| 119 | August 11 | Pirates | 3–2 | **Corpas** (1–2) | Morris (5–5) | **Brothers** (10) | 44,657 | 55–64 |
| 120 | August 12 | Padres | 14–2 | **Chacín** (11–6) | Vólquez (8–10) | | 30,986 | 56–64 |
| 121 | August 13 | Padres | 7–5 | Stauffer (2–1) | **Manship** (0–2) | Street (23) | 30,366 | 56–65 |
| 122 | August 14 | Padres | 4–2 | **de la Rosa** (12–6) | Cashner (8–7) | **Brothers** (11) | 30,099 | 57–65 |
| 123 | August 16 | @ Orioles | 6–3 | **Nicasio** (7–6) | Chen (6–6) | | 31,438 | 58–65 |
| 124 | August 17 | @ Orioles | 8–4 | Norris (9–10) | **Bettis** (0–2) | | 31,089 | 58–66 |
| 125 | August 18 | @ Orioles | 7–2 | Feldman (10–9) | **Chacín** (11–7) | | 22,238 | 58–67 |
| 126 | August 19 | @ Phillies | 5–4 | Martin (2–2) | **Manship** (0–3) | Papelbon (21) | 35,269 | 58–68 |
| 127 | August 20 | @ Phillies | 5–3 | **de la Rosa** (13–6) | Cloyd (2–3) | **Betancourt** (16) | 34,018 | 59–68 |
| 128 | August 21 | @ Phillies | 4–3 | Diekman (1–3) | **Betancourt** (2–4) | | 36,578 | 59–69 |
| 129 | August 22 | @ Phillies | 5–4 | Jiménez (1–0) | **Betancourt** (2–5) | | 31,619 | 59–70 |
| 130 | August 23 | @ Marlins | 3–2 | **Chacín** (12–7) | Qualls (4–2) | **Brothers** (12) | 19,253 | 60–70 |
| 131 | August 24 | @ Marlins | 3–0 | Fernández (10–5) | **Manship** (0–4) | Cishek (28) | 23,333 | 60–71 |
| 132 | August 25 | @ Marlins | 4–3 | **de la Rosa** (14–6) | Turner (3–5) | **Brothers** (13) | 20,191 | 61–71 |
| 133 | August 26 | Giants | 6–1 | **Nicasio** (8–6) | Zito (4–10) | | 30,364 | 62–71 |
| 134 | August 27 | Giants | 5–3 | Petit (1–0) | **Bettis** (0–3) | Romo (32) | 26,601 | 62–72 |
| 135 | August 28 | Giants | 5–4 | **Chacín** (13–7) | Bumgarner (11–9) | **Brothers** (14) | 27,268 | 63–72 |
| 136 | August 30 | Reds | 9–6 | **de la Rosa** (15–6) | Arroyo (13–10) | | 29,415 | 64–72 |
| 137 | August 31 | Reds | 8–3 | Reynolds (1–2) | **Nicasio** (8–7) | | 37,616 | 64–73 |

September (10–15)

| # | Date | Opponent | Score | Win | Loss | Save | Attendance | Record |
|---|---|---|---|---|---|---|---|---|
| 138 | September 1 | Reds | 7–4 | **Ottavino** (1–2) | Leake (11–6) | | 30,594 | 65–73 |
| 139 | September 2 | Dodgers | 10–8 | Kershaw (14–8) | **Manship** (0–5) | Jansen (25) | 36,822 | 65–74 |
| 140 | September 3 | Dodgers | 7–4 | Nolasco (12–9) | **Chacín** (13–8) | Withrow (1) | 25,807 | 65–75 |
| 141 | September 4 | Dodgers | 7–5 | **de la Rosa** (16–6) | Vólquez (9–11) | **Brothers** (15) | 28,439 | 66–75 |
| 142 | September 6 | @ Padres | 4–3 | Street (2–4) | **Brothers** (2–1) | | 21,476 | 66–76 |
| 143 | September 7 | @ Padres | 2–1 | Gregerson (6–7) | **Belisle** (5–6) | Street (28) | 25,272 | 66–77 |
| 144 | September 8 | @ Padres | 5–2 | Vincent (4–2) | **Oswalt** (0–5) | Street (29) | 18,656 | 66–78 |
| 145 | September 9 | @ Giants | 3–2 (10) | Casilla (6–2) | **Ottavino** (1–3) | | 41,078 | 66–79 |
| 146 | September 10 | @ Giants | 9–8 | **López** (3–4) | Romo (4–7) | **Brothers** (16) | 41,171 | 67–79 |
| 147 | September 11 | @ Giants | 4–3 | Moscoso (2–2) | **Belisle** (5–7) | Casilla (2) | 41,128 | 67–80 |
| 148 | September 13 | @ Diamondbacks | 7–5 | **Outman** (3–0) | Harris (3–1) | **Brothers** (17) | 31,713 | 68–80 |
| 149 | September 14 | @ Diamondbacks | 9–2 | Miley (10–10) | **Oswalt** (0–6) | | 32,237 | 68–81 |
| 150 | September 15 | @ Diamondbacks | 8–2 | Delgado (5–6) | **Chacín** (13–9) | | 26,845 | 68–82 |
| 151 | September 16 | Cardinals | 6–2 | **Bettis** (1–3) | Rosenthal (2–4) | | 31,117 | 69–82 |
| 152 | September 17 | Cardinals | 11–4 | Kelly (9–4) | **Nicasio** (8–8) | | 27,107 | 69–83 |
| 153 | September 18 | Cardinals | 4–3 | Wainwright (17–9) | **Chatwood** (7–5) | Mujica (37) | 26,955 | 69–84 |
| 154 | September 19 | Cardinals | 7–6 (15) | **Scahill** (1–0) | Salas (0–3) | | 33,258 | 70–84 |
| 155 | September 20 | Diamondbacks | 9–4 | **Chacín** (14–9) | Sipp (3–2) | | 38,247 | 71–84 |
| 156 | September 21 | Diamondbacks | 7–2 | Cahill (8–10) | **McHugh** (0–3) | | 36,005 | 71–85 |
| 157 | September 22 | Diamondbacks | 13–9 | Harris (4–1) | **Nicasio** (8–9) | | 43,736 | 71–86 |
| 158 | September 24 | Red Sox | 8–3 | **Chatwood** (8–5) | Lackey (10–13) | | 32,315 | 72–86 |
| 159 | September 25 | Red Sox | 15–5 | Peavy (12–5) | **Chacín** (14–10) | | 48,775 | 72–87 |
| 160 | September 27 | @ Dodgers | 11–0 | Kershaw (16–9) | **McHugh** (0–4) | | 52,367 | 72–88 |
| 161 | September 28 | @ Dodgers | 1–0 | **Nicasio** (9–9) | Greinke (15–4) | **Brothers** (18) | 52,879 | 73–88 |
| 162 | September 29 | @ Dodgers | 2–1 | **Francis** (3–5) | Ryu (14–8) | **Brothers** (19) | 52,396 | 74–88 |

== Player stats ==
| = Indicates team leader |

=== Batting ===
==== Starters by position ====
Note: Pos = Position; G = Games played; AB = At bats; H = Hits; Avg. = Batting average; HR = Home runs; RBI = Runs batted in

| Pos | Player | G | AB | H | Avg. | HR | RBI |
|---|---|---|---|---|---|---|---|
| C | Wilin Rosario | 121 | 449 | 131 | .292 | 21 | 79 |
| 1B | Todd Helton | 124 | 397 | 99 | .249 | 15 | 61 |
| 2B | DJ LeMahieu | 109 | 404 | 113 | .280 | 2 | 28 |
| SS | Troy Tulowitzki | 126 | 446 | 139 | .312 | 25 | 82 |
| 3B | Nolan Arenado | 133 | 486 | 130 | .267 | 10 | 52 |
| LF | Carlos González | 110 | 391 | 118 | .302 | 26 | 70 |
| CF | Dexter Fowler | 119 | 415 | 109 | .263 | 12 | 42 |
| RF | Michael Cuddyer | 130 | 489 | 162 | .331 | 20 | 84 |

==== Other batters ====
Note: G = Games played; AB = At bats; H = Hits; Avg. = Batting average; HR = Home runs; RBI = Runs batted in

| Player | G | AB | H | Avg. | HR | RBI |
|---|---|---|---|---|---|---|
| Josh Rutledge | 88 | 285 | 67 | .235 | 7 | 19 |
| Jordan Pacheco | 95 | 247 | 59 | .239 | 1 | 22 |
| Charlie Blackmon | 82 | 246 | 76 | .309 | 6 | 22 |
| Jonathan Herrera | 81 | 195 | 57 | .292 | 1 | 16 |
| Corey Dickerson | 69 | 194 | 51 | .263 | 5 | 17 |
| Yorvit Torrealba | 61 | 179 | 43 | .240 | 0 | 16 |
| Eric Young, Jr. | 57 | 165 | 40 | .242 | 1 | 6 |
| Charlie Culberson | 47 | 99 | 29 | .293 | 2 | 12 |
| Tyler Colvin | 27 | 75 | 12 | .160 | 3 | 10 |
| Chris Nelson | 21 | 66 | 16 | .242 | 0 | 4 |
| Reid Brignac | 29 | 48 | 12 | .250 | 1 | 6 |
| Ryan Wheeler | 28 | 41 | 9 | .220 | 0 | 7 |

=== Pitching ===
==== Starting pitchers ====
Note: G = Games pitched; IP = Innings pitched; W = Wins; L = Losses; ERA = Earned run average; SO = Strikeouts

| Player | G | IP | W | L | ERA | SO |
|---|---|---|---|---|---|---|
| Jhoulys Chacín | 31 | 197.1 | 14 | 10 | 3.47 | 126 |
| Jorge De La Rosa | 30 | 167.2 | 16 | 6 | 3.49 | 112 |
| Juan Nicasio | 31 | 157.2 | 9 | 9 | 5.14 | 119 |
| Tyler Chatwood | 20 | 111.1 | 8 | 5 | 3.15 | 66 |
| Jon Garland | 12 | 68.0 | 4 | 6 | 5.82 | 32 |
| Collin McHugh | 4 | 19.0 | 0 | 3 | 9.95 | 8 |

==== Other pitchers ====
Note: G = Games pitched; IP = Innings pitched; W = Wins; L = Losses; ERA = Earned run average; SO = Strikeouts

| Player | G | IP | W | L | ERA | SO |
|---|---|---|---|---|---|---|
| Jeff Francis | 23 | 70.1 | 3 | 5 | 6.27 | 63 |
| Chad Bettis | 16 | 44.2 | 1 | 3 | 5.64 | 30 |
| Roy Oswalt | 9 | 32.1 | 0 | 6 | 8.63 | 34 |
| Jeff Manship | 11 | 30.2 | 0 | 5 | 7.04 | 18 |
| Drew Pomeranz | 8 | 21.2 | 0 | 4 | 6.23 | 19 |

==== Relief pitchers ====
Note: G = Games pitched; W = Wins; L = Losses; SV = Saves; ERA = Earned run average; SO = Strikeouts

| Player | G | W | L | SV | ERA | SO |
|---|---|---|---|---|---|---|
| Rex Brothers | 72 | 2 | 1 | 19 | 1.74 | 76 |
| Wilton López | 75 | 3 | 4 | 0 | 4.06 | 48 |
| Matt Belisle | 72 | 5 | 7 | 0 | 4.32 | 62 |
| Josh Outman | 61 | 3 | 0 | 0 | 4.33 | 53 |
| Adam Ottavino | 51 | 1 | 3 | 0 | 2.64 | 78 |
| Edgmer Escalona | 37 | 1 | 4 | 0 | 5.67 | 34 |
| Rafael Betancourt | 32 | 2 | 5 | 16 | 4.08 | 27 |
| Manny Corpas | 31 | 1 | 2 | 0 | 4.54 | 30 |
| Rob Scahill | 23 | 1 | 0 | 0 | 5.13 | 20 |
| Mitchell Boggs | 9 | 0 | 0 | 0 | 3.12 | 5 |
| Chris Volstad | 6 | 0 | 0 | 0 | 10.80 | 3 |
| Logan Kensing | 1 | 0 | 0 | 0 | 0.00 | 1 |

== Farm system ==
| Level | Team | League | Manager |
|---|---|---|---|
| AAA | Colorado Springs Sky Sox | Pacific Coast League | Glenallen Hill |
| AA | Tulsa Drillers | Texas League | Kevin Riggs |
| A | Modesto Nuts | California League | Lenn Sakata and Fred Nelson |
| A | Asheville Tourists | South Atlantic League | Fred Ocasio |
| A-Short Season | Tri-City Dust Devils | Northwest League | Drew Saylor |
| Rookie | Grand Junction Rockies | Pioneer League | Anthony Sanders |

Records
| Preceded by 2012 | Colorado Rockies seasons 2013 | Succeeded by 2014 |
