= 2013 Arizona Diamondbacks season =

2013 Arizona Diamondbacks
- League: National League
- Division: West
- Ballpark: Chase Field
- City: Phoenix, Arizona
- Record: 81–81 (.500)
- Divisional place: 2nd
- Owners: Ken Kendrick
- General managers: Kevin Towers
- Managers: Kirk Gibson
- Television: Fox Sports Arizona (Steve Berthiaume, Bob Brenly, Greg Schulte)
- Radio: KTAR (620 AM) (Greg Schulte, Tom Candiotti, Jeff Munn); KSUN (Spanish) (Oscar Soria, Miguel Quintana
- Stats: ESPN.com; Baseball Reference

The Arizona Diamondbacks' 2013 season, was the franchise's 16th season in Major League Baseball and also their 16th season at Chase Field.

The Diamondbacks played 25 extra inning games during the season, the most of any MLB team in 2013.

== Regular season ==
=== Season standings ===
==== National League West ====
NL West
Team	W	L	Pct.	GB	Home	Road
Los Angeles Dodgers	92	70	.568	—	47‍–‍34	45‍–‍36
Arizona Diamondbacks	81	81	.500	11	45‍–‍36	36‍–‍45
San Diego Padres	76	86	.469	16	45‍–‍36	31‍–‍50
San Francisco Giants	76	86	.469	16	42‍–‍40	34‍–‍46
Colorado Rockies	74	88	.457	18	45‍–‍36	29‍–‍52

==== National League Divisional Winners ====
Division winners
Team	W	L	Pct.
St. Louis Cardinals	97	65	.599
Atlanta Braves	96	66	.593
Los Angeles Dodgers	92	70	.568

Wild Card teams (Top 2 teams qualify for postseason)
Team	W	L	Pct.	GB
Pittsburgh Pirates	94	68	.580	+4
Cincinnati Reds	90	72	.556	—
Washington Nationals	86	76	.531	4
Arizona Diamondbacks	81	81	.500	9
San Francisco Giants	76	86	.469	14
San Diego Padres	76	86	.469	14
Colorado Rockies	74	88	.457	16
New York Mets	74	88	.457	16
Milwaukee Brewers	74	88	.457	16
Philadelphia Phillies	73	89	.451	17
Chicago Cubs	66	96	.407	24
Miami Marlins	62	100	.383	28

=== Record vs. opponents ===
2013 National League record Source: MLB Standings Grid – 2013
Team	AZ	ATL	CHC	CIN	COL	LAD	MIA	MIL	NYM	PHI	PIT	SD	SF	STL	WSH	AL
Arizona	—	2–4	4–3	3–4	12–7	10–9	4–2	6–1	3–4	3–4	3–3	7–12	7–12	4–3	2–4	11–9
Atlanta	4–2	—	5–1	4–3	6–1	5–2	13–6	2–4	10–9	11–8	4–3	1–5	3–4	4–3	13–6	11–9
Chicago	3–4	1–5	—	5–14	3–3	1–6	4–3	6–13	3–3	3–3	7–12	3–4	4–3	7–12	3–4	13–7
Cincinnati	4–3	3–4	14–5	—	2–4	4–3	6–1	10–9	4–2	4–2	8–11	3–3	6–1	8–11	3–4	11–9
Colorado	7–12	1–6	3–3	4–2	—	10–9	3–4	4–2	3–4	3–4	4–2	12–7	9–10	3–4	3–4	5–15
Los Angeles	9–10	2–5	6–1	3–4	9–10	—	5–2	4–2	5–1	5–2	4–2	11–8	8–11	4–3	5–1	12–8
Miami	2–4	6–13	3–4	1–6	4–3	2–5	—	1–5	11–8	7–12	2–4	3–4	4–3	2–4	5–14	9–11
Milwaukee	1–6	4–2	13–6	9–10	2–4	2–4	5–1	—	4–3	5–2	7–12	3–4	5–2	5–14	3–4	6–14
New York	4–3	9–10	3–3	2–4	4–3	1–5	8–11	3–4	—	10–9	2–5	4–3	4–2	2–5	7–12	11–9
Philadelphia	4–3	8–11	3–3	2–4	4–3	2–5	12–7	2–5	9–10	—	3–4	4–2	3–3	2–5	8–11	7–13
Pittsburgh	3–3	3–4	12–7	11–8	2–4	2–4	4–2	12–7	5–2	4–3	—	3–4	4–3	10–9	4–3	15–5
San Diego	12–7	5–1	4–3	3–3	7–12	8–11	4–3	4–3	3–4	2–4	4–3	—	8–11	2–4	2–5	8–12
San Francisco	12–7	4–3	3–4	1–6	10–9	11–8	3–4	2–5	2–4	3–3	3–4	11–8	—	2–4	3–3	6–14
St. Louis	3–4	3–4	12–7	11–8	4–3	3–4	4–2	14–5	5–2	5–2	9–10	4–2	4–2	—	6–0	10–10
Washington	4–2	6–13	4–3	4–3	4–3	1–5	14–5	4–3	12–7	11–8	3–4	5–2	3–3	0–6	—	11–9

=== Game log ===
Legend
Diamondbacks Win	Diamondbacks Loss	Game postponed	**Bold** – Diamondbacks Player

2013 Game Log (81–81)
April (15–12)

#	Date	Opponent	Score	Win	Loss	Save	Attendance	Record
1	April 1	Cardinals	6–2	**Kennedy** (1–0)	Wainwright (0–1)		48,033	1–0
2	April 2	Cardinals	1–6	García (1–0)	**Cahill** (0–1)		28,387	1–1
3	April 3	Cardinals	10–9 (16)	**Collmenter** (1–0)	Salas (0–1)		26,896	2–1
4	April 5	@ Brewers	3–1	**Miley** (1–0)	Badenhop (0–1)	**Putz** (1)	24,623	3–1
5	April 6	@ Brewers	9–2	**Corbin** (1–0)	Fiers (0–1)		30,115	4–1
6	April 7	@ Brewers	8–7 (11)	**Sipp** (1–0)	Axford (0–1)	**Bell** (1)	37,733	5–1
7	April 8	Pirates	3–5	Gómez (1–0)	**Cahill** (0–1)	Grilli (2)	21,392	5–2
8	April 9	Pirates	5–6	McDonald (1–0)	**McCarthy** (0–1)	Grilli (3)	19,872	5–3
9	April 10	Pirates	10–2	**Miley** (2–0)	Sánchez (0–2)		17,769	6–3
10	April 12	Dodgers	3–0	**Corbin** (2–0)	Kershaw (2–1)	**Putz** (2)	29,520	7–3
11	April 13	Dodgers	5–7	Ryu (2–1)	**Kennedy** (1–1)	League (4)	37,214	7–4
12	April 14	Dodgers	1–0	**Putz** (1–0)	Beckett (0–2)		32,313	8–4
13	April 16	@ Yankees	2–4	Nova (1–1)	**McCarthy** (0–2)	Rivera (3)	34,107	8–5
14	April 17	@ Yankees	3–4	Sabathia (3–1)	**Hernandez** (0–1)	Rivera (4)	34,369	8–6
15	April 18	@ Yankees	6–2 (12)	**Bell** (1–0)	Phelps (0–1)		36,033	9–6
16	April 19	@ Rockies	1–3	Chacin (3–0)	**Kennedy** (1–2)	Betancourt (6)	23,445	9–7
17	April 20	@ Rockies	3–4	de la Rosa (2–1)	**Cahill** (0–3)	Betancourt (7)	30,380	9–8
18	April 21	@ Rockies	5–4	**Bell** (2–0)	López (0–1)	**Putz** (3)	42,507	10–8
19	April 22	@ Giants	4–5	Romo (1–1)	**Sipp** (2–0)		41,294	10–9
20	April 23	@ Giants	6–4 (11)	**Ziegler** (1–0)	Casilla (2–2)	**Reynolds** (1)	41,955	11–9
21	April 24	@ Giants	3–2 (10)	**Hernandez** (1–1)	Gaudin (0–1)	**Reynolds** (2)	41,756	12–9
22	April 25	Rockies	3–2	**Cahill** (1–3)	de la Rosa (2–2)	**Putz** (4)	24,532	13–9
23	April 26	Rockies	3–6	Nicasio (3–0)	**McCarthy** (0–3)	Betancourt (8)	28,801	13–10
24	April 27	Rockies	3–2 (10)	**Putz** (2–0)	Escalona (1–1)		31,019	14–10
25	April 28	Rockies	4–2	**Corbin** (3–0)	Garland (2–2)	**Putz** (5)	24,852	15–10
26	April 29	Giants	4–6	Machi (1–0)	**Ziegler** (1–1)	Romo (9)	18,036	15–11
27	April 30	Giants	1–2	Rosario (1–0)	**Putz** (2–1)	Romo (10)	20,319	15–12

May (15–12)

#	Date	Opponent	Score	Win	Loss	Save	Attendance	Record
28	May 1	Giants	6–9	Kontos (2–1)	**Hernandez** (1–2)	Romo (11)	21,177	15–13
29	May 3	@ Padres	6–7	Marquis (3–2)	**Miley** (2–1)	Street (7)	31,223	15–14
30	May 4	@ Padres	8–1	**Corbin** (4–0)	Richard (0–4)		31,336	16–14
31	May 5	@ Padres	1–5	Volquez (3–3)	**Kennedy** (1–3)		29,101	16–15
32	May 6	@ Dodgers	9–2	**Cahill** (2–3)	Capuano (0–2)		30,981	17–15
33	May 7	@ Dodgers	5–3	**Hernandez** (2–2)	League (0–2)	**Bell** (2)	33,611	18–15
34	May 8	@ Dodgers	3–2	**Miley** (3–1)	Jansen (1–1)	**Bell** (3)	31,512	19–15
35	May 9	Phillies	2–1	**Corbin** (5–0)	Hamels (1–5)	**Bell** (4)	20,002	20–15
36	May 10	Phillies	3–2	**Sipp** (2–1)	Adams (1–3)	**Hernandez** (1)	31,900	21–15
37	May 11	Phillies	1–3	Lee (4–2)	**Cahill** (2–4)	Papelbon (6)	28,113	21–16
38	May 12	Phillies	2–4 (10)	De Fratus (1–0)	**Reynolds** (0–1)	Papelbon (7)	32,785	21–17
39	May 13	Braves	1–10	Minor (5–2)	**Miley** (3–2)		25,052	21–18
40	May 14	Braves	2–0	**Corbin** (6–0)	Teherán (2–1)	**Bell** (5)	30,150	22–18
41	May 15	Braves	5–3	**Kennedy** (2–3)	Hudson (4–3)	**Bell** (6)	23,524	23–18
42	May 17	@ Marlins	9–2	**Cahill** (3–4)	Slowey (1–4)		13,444	24–18
43	May 18	@ Marlins	1–0	**McCarthy** (1–3)	Koehler (0–2)		18,786	25–18
44	May 19	@ Marlins	1–2	Nolasco (3–5)	**Miley** (3–3)	Dunn (1)	20,206	25–19
45	May 20	@ Rockies	5–1	**Corbin** (7–0)	Garland (3–5)		23,053	26–19 Archived March 4, 2016, at the Wayback Machine
46	May 21	@ Rockies	4–5 (10)	López (1–1)	**Reynolds** (0–2)		27,096	26–20 Archived March 4, 2016, at the Wayback Machine
47	May 22	@ Rockies	1–4	de la Rosa (6–3)	**Cahill** (3–5)	Brothers (1)	31,763	26–21 Archived March 3, 2016, at the Wayback Machine
48	May 24	Padres	5–2	**McCarthy** (2–3)	Stults (4–4)	**Bell** (7)	24,043	27–21
49	May 25	Padres	4–10	Cashner (4–2)	**Miley** (3–4)		26,628	27–22
50	May 26	Padres	6–5	**Corbin** (8–0)	Layne (0–1)	**Bell** (8)	27,639	28–22
51	May 27	Rangers	5–3	**Skaggs** (1–0)	Perez (0–1)	**Bell** (9)	30,638	29–22
52	May 27	Rangers	5–4	**Ziegler** (2–1)	Frasor (0–1)		23,622	30–22
-	May 29	@ Rangers	Postponed (rain) Rescheduled for August 1					
53	May 30	@ Rangers	5–9	Grimm (5–3)	**McCarthy** (2–4)		30,896	30–23
54	May 31	@ Cubs	2–7	Garza (1–0)	**Miley** (3–5)		24,645	30–24

June (12–15)

#	Date	Opponent	Score	Win	Loss	Save	Attendance	Record
55	June 1	@ Cubs	12–4	**Kennedy** (3–3)	Mármol (2–3)		31,465	31–24
56	June 2	@ Cubs	8–4	**Corbin** (9–0)	Jackson (1–8)		29,667	32–24
57	June 3	@ Cardinals	1–7	Lynn (8–1)	**Cahill** (3–6)		38,042	32–25
58	June 4	@ Cardinals	7–6 (14)	**Collmenter** (2–0)	Marte (0–1)	**Bell** (10)	39,222	33–25
59	June 5	@ Cardinals	10–3	**Miley** (4–5)	Kelly (0–3)		40,792	34–25
60	June 6	@ Cardinals	8–12	Miller (7–3)	**Kennedy** (3–4)	Mujica (18)	43,798	34–26
61	June 7	Giants	3–1	**Ziegler** (3–1)	Affeldt (1–2)	**Bell** (11)	37,542	35–26
62	June 8	Giants	5–10	Bumgarner (5–4)	**Cahill** (3–7)		44,574	35–27
63	June 9	Giants	2–6	Gaudin (2–1)	**Skaggs** (1–1)		38,222	35–28
64	June 10	@ Dodgers	5–4	**Sipp** (3–1)	League (2–3)	**Bell** (12)	38,275	36–28
65	June 11	@ Dodgers	3–5	Guerrier (2–2)	**Hernandez** (2–3)	Jansen (3)	42,844	36–29
66	June 12	@ Dodgers	8–6 (12)	**Collmenter** (3–0)	Belisario (3–5)		41,927	37–29
67	June 14	@ Padres	1–2	Stults (2–5)	**Cahill** (3–8)		23,364	37–30
68	June 15	@ Padres	4–6	Marquis (9–2)	**Miley** (4–6)	Street (12)	29,756	37–31
69	June 16	@ Padres	1–4	Richard (2–5)	**Hernandez** (2–4)	Street (13)	27,943	37–32
70	June 17	Marlins	2–3	Dunn (2–1)	**Bell** (2–1)	Cishek (10)	19,354	37–33
71	June 18	Marlins	3–2	**Hernandez** (3–4)	Qualls (2–1)		21,067	38–33
72	June 19	Marlins	3–1	**Hernandez** (4–4)	Fernández (4–4)	**Bell** (13)	26,867	39–33
73	June 21	Reds	11–5	**Harris** (1–0)	Cueto (4–1)		27,819	40–33
74	June 22	Reds	4–3	**Ziegler** (4–1)	Chapman (3–3)		30,567	41–33
75	June 23	Reds	2–4	Latos (7–1)	**Delgado** (0–1)	Chapman (19)	30,723	41–34
76	June 25	@ Nationals	5–7	Gonzalez (4–3)	**Cahill** (3–9)	Soriano (20)	30,287	41–35
77	June 26	@ Nationals	2–3	Zimmermann (11–3)	**Miley** (4–7)	Soriano (21)	31,172	41–36
78	June 27	@ Nationals	3–2 (11)	**Collmenter** (4–0)	Stammen (4–3)	**Bell** (14)	32,948	42–36
79	June 28	@ Braves	0–3	Teherán (6–4)	**Delgado** (0–2)	Kimbrel (23)	48,282	42–37
80	June 29	@ Braves	5–11	Walden (3–1)	**Hernandez** (4–5)		39,180	42–38
81	June 30	@ Braves	2–6	Maholm (9–6)	**Cahill** (3–10)		34,574	42–39

July (13–13)

#	Date	Opponent	Score	Win	Loss	Save	Attendance	Record
82	July 1	@ Mets	4–5 (13)	Aardsma (1–0)	**Collmenter** (4–1)		22,240	42–40
83	July 2	@ Mets	1–9	Hefner (3–6)	**Corbin** (9–1)		21,500	42–41
84	July 3	@ Mets	5–3	**Delgado** (1–2)	Harvey (7–2)	**Bell** (15)	41,257	43–41
85	July 4	@ Mets	5–4 (15)	**Roe** (1–0)	Rice (3–5)	**Ziegler** (1)	24,224	44–41
86	July 5	Rockies	5–0	**Skaggs** (2–1)	de la Rosa (8–5)		45,505	45–41
87	July 6	Rockies	11–1	**Miley** (5–7)	Pomeranz (0–2)		22,395	46–41
88	July 7	Rockies	6–1	**Corbin** (10–1)	Oswalt (0–4)		22,090	47–41
89	July 8	Dodgers	1–6	Greinke (7–2)	**Delgado** (1–3)		22,614	47–42
90	July 9	Dodgers	1–6	Nolasco (6–8)	**Kennedy** (3–5)		23,409	47–43
91	July 10	Dodgers	5–7 (14)	Jansen (3–3)	**Collmenter** (4–2)		24,466	47–44
92	July 11	Brewers	5–3	**Miley** (6–7)	Henderson (3–3)	**Ziegler** (2)	17,531	48–44
93	July 12	Brewers	2–1	**Corbin** (11–1)	Gorzelanny (1–3)	**Hernandez** (2)	19,681	49–44
94	July 13	Brewers	5–4	**Harris** (2–0)	Lohse (5–7)	**Ziegler** (3)	33,566	50–44
95	July 14	Brewers	1–5	Peralta (7–9)	**Kennedy** (3–6)		25,057	50–45
96	July 19	@ Giants	0–2	Gaudin (4–1)	**Kennedy** (3–7)	Romo (22)	41,924	50–46
97	July 20	@ Giants	3–4	Cain (6–6)	**Miley** (6–8)	Romo (23)	41,742	50–47
98	July 21	@ Giants	3–1	**Delgado** (2–3)	Bumgarner (10–6)	**Ziegler** (4)	41,949	51–47
99	July 22	Cubs	2–4	Rusin (1–0)	**Skaggs** (2–2)	Gregg (19)	21,288	51–48
100	July 23	Cubs	10–4	**Corbin** (12–1)	Wood (6–7)		21,278	52–48
101	July 24	Cubs	6–7 (12)	Rondon (2–0)	**Hernandez** (4–6)		21,141	52–49
102	July 25	Cubs	3–1	**Miley** (7–8)	Villanueva (2–7)	**Ziegler** (5)	23,341	53–49
103	July 26	Padres	10–0	**Delgado** (3–3)	Stults (8–9)		22,249	54–49
104	July 27	Padres	3–12	Cashner (7–5)	**Skaggs** (2–3)		30,033	54–50
105	July 28	Padres	0–1	Ross (2–4)	**Corbin** (12–2)	Street (19)	24,864	54–51
106	July 30	@ Rays	2–5	Hernández (6–11)	**Kennedy** (3–8)		17,402	54–52
107	July 31	@ Rays	7–0	**Miley** (8–8)	Hellickson (10–4)		25,095	55–52

August (14–13)

#	Date	Opponent	Score	Win	Loss	Save	Attendance	Record
108	August 1	@ Rangers	1–7	Darvish (10–5)	**Spruill** (0–1)		41,569	55–53
109	August 2	@ Red Sox	7–6	**Delgado** (4–3)	Beato (1–1)	**Ziegler** (6)	37,652	56–53
110	August 3	@ Red Sox	2–5	Peavy (9–4)	**Corbin** (12–3)	Uehara (10)	37,941	56–54
111	August 4	@ Red Sox	0–4	Doubront (8–5)	**McCarthy** (2–5)		37,611	56–55
112	August 6	Rays	6–1	**Miley** (9–8)	Hellickson (10–5)		19,458	57–55
113	August 7	Rays	9–8	**Putz** (3–1)	Peralta (1–5)	**Ziegler** (7)	18,733	58–55
114	August 9	Mets	5–4	**Ziegler** (5–1)	Atchison (2–1)		25,187	59–55
115	August 10	Mets	1–4	Wheeler (5–2)	**McCarthy** (2–6)	Hawkins (3)	42,450	59–56
116	August 11	Mets	5–9	Niese (4–6)	**Spruill** (0–2)		28,260	59–57
117	August 12	Orioles	7–6	**Ziegler** (6–1)	O'Day (5–2)		18,889	60–57
118	August 13	Orioles	4–3 (11)	**Bell** (3–1)	McFarland (1–1)		20,036	61–57
119	August 14	Orioles	5–4 (14)	**Bell** (4–1)	Norris (8–10)		19,568	62–57
120	August 16	@ Pirates	2–6	Cole (6–5)	**McCarthy** (2–7)		39,091	62–58
121	August 17	@ Pirates	15–5	**Cahill** (4–10)	Locke (9–4)		37,982	63–58
122	August 18	@ Pirates	4–2 (16)	**Ziegler** (7–1)	Johnson (0–1)	**Putz** (6)	37,518	64–58
123	August 19	@ Reds	3–5	Arroyo (12–9)	**Delgado** (4–4)	Chapman (31)	20,349	64–59
124	August 20	@ Reds	5–2	**Corbin** (13–3)	Cingrani (6–3)		20,092	65–59
125	August 21	@ Reds	7–10	Leake (11–5)	**McCarthy** (2–8)	Chapman (32)	23,297	65–60
126	August 22	@ Reds	1–2	Latos (13–4)	**De La Rosa** (0–1)	LeCure (1)	21,166	65–61
127	August 23	@ Phillies	3–4	Papelbon (4–1)	**Bell** (4–2)		32,619	65–62
128	August 24	@ Phillies	12–7 (18)	**Cahill** (5–10)	Wells (0–1)		34,637	66–62
129	August 25	@ Phillies	5–9	Halladay (3–4)	**Corbin** (13–4)		36,128	66–63
130	August 26	Padres	6–1	**McCarthy** (3–8)	Ross (3–7)		16,871	67–63
131	August 27	Padres	10–9 (10)	**Bell** (5–2)	Thayer (2–4)		19,807	68–63
132	August 28	Padres	1–5	Erlin (2–2)	**Miley** (9–9)		20,578	68–64
133	August 30	Giants	0–1	Lincecum (8–13)	**Delgado** (4–5)	Romo (33)	24,380	68–65
134	August 31	Giants	4–3	**Ziegler** (8–1)	Rosario (3–2)		36,091	69–65

September (12–16)

#	Date	Opponent	Score	Win	Loss	Save	Attendance	Record
135	September 1	Giants	2–8	Petit (2–0)	**Corbin** (13–5)		33,422	69–66
136	September 2	Blue Jays	1–4	Rogers (4–7)	**McCarthy** (3–9)	Janssen (27)	21,014	69–67
137	September 3	Blue Jays	4–10	Redmond (3–2)	**Miley** (9-10)		19,100	69–68
138	September 4	Blue Jays	4–3 (10)	**Harris** (3–0)	Pérez (0-1)		16,154	70–68
139	September 5	@ Giants	4–2	**Cahill** (6-10)	Vogelsong (3–5)	**Ziegler** (8)	41,193	71–68
140	September 6	@ Giants	0–3	Petit (3–0)	**Corbin** (13–6)		41,180	71–69
141	September 7	@ Giants	2–1	**McCarthy** (4–9)	Cain (8–9)	**Ziegler** (9)	41,076	72–69
142	September 8	@ Giants	2–3 (11)	López (3–2)	**Thatcher** (3–2)		41,050	72–70
143	September 9	@ Dodgers	1–8	Nolasco (13–9)	**Delgado** (4–6)		52,410	72–71
144	September 10	@ Dodgers	3–5 (11)	Withrow (3–0)	**Collmenter** (4–3)		41,867	72–72
145	September 11	@ Dodgers	4–1	**Corbin** (14–6)	Ryu (13–6)	**Ziegler** (10)	40,818	73–72
146	September 13	Rockies	5–7	Outman (3–0)	**Harris** (3-1)	Brothers (17)	31,713	73–73
147	September 14	Rockies	9–2	**Miley** (10-10)	Oswalt (0–6)		32,237	74–73
148	September 15	Rockies	8–2	**Delgado** (5–6)	Chacín (13–9)		26,845	75–73
149	September 16	Dodgers	2-1	**Cahill** (7-10)	Ryu (13–7)	**Ziegler** (11)	24,933	76–73
150	September 17	Dodgers	3–9	Greinke (15–3)	**Corbin** (14–7)		26,304	76–74
151	September 18	Dodgers	9–4	**McCarthy** (5–9)	Fife (4–4)		27,305	77–74
152	September 19	Dodgers	6–7	Howell (3-1)	**Collmenter** (4–4)	Jansen (26)	22,763	77–75
153	September 20	@ Rockies	4–9	Chacín (14–9)	**Sipp** (3–2)		38,247	77–76
154	September 21	@ Rockies	7–2	**Cahill** (8-10)	McHugh (0–3)		36,005	78–76
155	September 22	@ Rockies	13–9	**Harris** (4-1)	Nicasio (8–9)		43,736	79–76
156	September 23	@ Padres	1–4	Stults (10-13)	**McCarthy** (5-10)	Street (33)	15,869	79–77
157	September 24	@ Padres	2-1 (12)	**Collmenter** (5–4)	Gregerson (6–8)	**Ziegler** (12)	18,562	80–77
158	September 25	@ Padres	2-12	Kennedy (7-10)	**Delgado** (5–7)		29,528	80–78
159	September 26	@ Padres	2–3 (11)	Vincent (6–3)	**Collmenter** (5–5)		21,393	80–79
160	September 27	Nationals	4–8	Strasburg (8–9)	**Corbin** (14–8)		31,037	80–80
161	September 28	Nationals	0–2	Haren (10-14)	**McCarthy** (5-11)	Soriano (43)	29,673	80–81
162	September 29	Nationals	3–2	**Hernandez** (5–6)	Mattheus (0–2)	**Ziegler** (13)	30,420	81–81

=== Roster ===
2013 Arizona Diamondbacks
**Roster**
**Pitchers**: 21 Heath Bell; 77 Charles Brewer; 35 Trevor Cahill; 55 Josh Collmenter; 46 Patrick Corbin; 56 Eury De La Rosa; 48 Randall Delgado; 38 Will Harris; 30 David Hernandez; 33 David Holmberg; 31 Ian Kennedy; 43 Matt Langwell; 32 Brandon McCarthy; 36 Wade Miley; 47 Joe Patterson; 40 J. J. Putz; 45 Matt Reynolds; 34 Chaz Roe; 49 Tony Sipp; 37 Tyler Skaggs; 52 Zeke Spruill; 57 Joe Thatcher; 29 Brad Ziegler	**Catchers**: 54 Tuffy Gosewisch; 26 Miguel Montero; 27 Wil Nieves; **Infielders**: 18 Willie Bloomquist; 12 Eric Chavez; 24 Matt Davidson; 44 Paul Goldschmidt; 1 Didi Gregorius; 2 Aaron Hill; 22 Eric Hinske; 16 Chris Owings; 4 Cliff Pennington; 14 Martín Prado; 10 Josh Wilson	**Outfielders**: 19 Tony Campana; 6 Adam Eaton; 13 Jason Kubel; 17 Alfredo Marte; 8 Gerardo Parra; 11 A. J. Pollock; 7 Cody Ross	**Manager**: 23 Kirk Gibson; **Coaches**: 25 Don Baylor (hitting); 82 Jeff Motuzas (bullpen catcher); 50 Charles Nagy (pitching); 5 Steve Sax (first base); 53 Glenn Sherlock (bullpen); 3 Alan Trammell (bench); 15 Turner Ward (assistant hitting); 9 Matt Williams (third base)

=== Opening day lineup ===
- C – Miguel Montero
- P – Ian Kennedy
- 1B – Paul Goldschmidt
- 2B – Aaron Hill
- 3B – Martín Prado
- SS – Cliff Pennington
- LF – Jason Kubel
- CF – A. J. Pollock
- RF – Gerardo Parra

== Player stats ==
Note: Team leaders in batting and pitching categories are in bold.

=== Batting ===
Note: G = Games played; AB = At bats; R = Runs scored; H = Hits; 2B = Doubles; 3B = Triples; HR = Home runs; RBI = Runs batted in; AVG = Batting average; SB = Stolen bases

Player	G	AB	R	H	2B	3B	HR	RBI	AVG	SB
Martin Prado	155	**609**	70	172	36	2	14	82	.282	3
Paul Goldschmidt	**160**	602	**103**	**182**	36	3	**36**	**125**	**.302**	**15**
Gerardo Parra	156	601	79	161	**43**	4	10	48	.268	10
A.J. Pollock	137	443	64	119	28	**5**	8	38	.269	12
Miguel Montero	116	413	44	95	14	0	11	42	.230	0
Didi Gregorius	103	357	47	90	16	3	7	28	.252	0
Aaron Hill	87	327	45	95	21	1	11	41	.291	1
Cody Ross	94	317	33	88	17	1	8	38	.278	3
Cliff Pennington	96	269	25	65	13	1	1	18	.242	2
Adam Eaton	66	250	40	63	10	4	3	22	.252	5
Jason Kubel	89	241	21	53	8	1	5	32	.220	0
Eric Chavez	80	228	28	64	14	2	9	44	.281	1
Wil Nieves	71	195	16	58	11	0	1	22	.297	0
Willie Bloomquist	48	139	16	44	5	1	0	14	.317	0
Matt Davidson	31	76	8	18	6	0	3	12	.237	0
Josh Wilson	30	60	9	12	1	1	1	4	.200	0
Chris Owings	20	55	5	16	5	0	0	5	.291	2
Eric Hinske	52	52	2	9	3	0	1	6	.173	0
Tony Campana	29	46	10	12	0	1	0	0	.261	8
Tuffy Gosewisch	14	45	1	8	2	0	0	3	.178	0
Alfredo Marte	22	43	4	8	3	0	0	4	.186	0
Pitcher Totals	162	308	15	36	10	1	1	19	.117	0
**Team totals**	**162**	**5676**	**685**	**1468**	**302**	**31**	**130**	**647**	**.259**	**62**

=== Pitching ===
Note: W = Wins; L = Losses; ERA = Earned run average; G = Games pitched; GS = Games started; SV = Saves; IP = Innings pitched; H = Hits allowed; R = Runs allowed; ER = Earned runs allowed; BB = Walks allowed; K = Strikeouts

Player	W	L	ERA	G	GS	SV	IP	H	R	ER	BB	K
Patrick Corbin	**14**	8	**3.41**	32	32	0	**208.1**	189	81	79	54	**178**
Wade Miley	10	10	3.55	33	**33**	0	202.2	**201**	**88**	**80**	**66**	147
Trevor Cahill	8	10	3.99	26	25	0	146.2	143	70	65	65	102
Brandon McCarthy	5	**11**	4.53	22	22	0	135.0	161	71	68	21	76
Ian Kennedy	3	8	5.23	21	21	0	124.0	128	79	72	48	108
Randall Delgado	5	7	4.26	20	19	0	116.1	116	59	55	23	79
Josh Collmenter	5	5	3.13	49	0	0	92.0	79	34	32	33	85
Brad Ziegler	8	1	2.22	**78**	0	13	73.0	61	20	18	22	44
Heath Bell	5	2	4.11	69	0	**15**	65.2	74	30	30	16	72
David Hernandez	5	6	4.48	62	0	2	62.1	50	33	31	24	60
Will Harris	4	1	2.91	61	0	0	52.2	50	17	17	15	53
Tyler Skaggs	2	3	5.12	7	7	0	38.2	38	23	22	15	36
Tony Sipp	3	2	4.78	56	0	0	37.2	35	22	20	22	42
J.J. Putz	3	1	2.36	40	0	6	34.1	26	9	9	17	38
Matt Reynolds	0	2	1.98	30	0	2	27.1	25	7	6	5	23
Chaz Roe	1	0	4.03	21	0	0	22.1	18	10	10	13	24
Eury De La Rosa	0	1	7.36	19	0	0	14.2	13	13	12	5	16
Zeke Spruill	0	2	5.56	6	2	0	11.1	17	11	7	5	9
Joe Thatcher	0	1	6.75	22	0	0	9.1	12	7	7	6	7
Matt Langwell	0	0	5.19	8	0	0	8.2	8	5	5	5	6
Charles Brewer	0	0	3.00	4	0	0	6.0	8	2	2	2	5
David Holmberg	0	0	7.36	1	1	0	3.2	6	3	3	3	0
Joe Paterson	0	0	3.86	2	0	0	2.1	2	1	1	0	2
**Team totals**	**81**	**81**	**3.92**	**162**	**162**	**38**	**1495.0**	**1460**	**695**	**651**	**485**	**1218**

== Farm system ==
Level	Team	League	Manager
AAA	Reno Aces	Pacific Coast League	Brett Butler
AA	Mobile BayBears	Southern League	Andy Green
A	Visalia Rawhide	California League	Bill Plummer
A	South Bend Silver Hawks	Midwest League	Mark Haley
A-Short Season	Hillsboro Hops	Northwest League	Audo Vicente
Rookie	AZL Diamondbacks	Arizona League	Luis Urueta
Rookie	Missoula Osprey	Pioneer League	Robby Hammock
