= Colt Hynes =

American baseball player (born 1985)

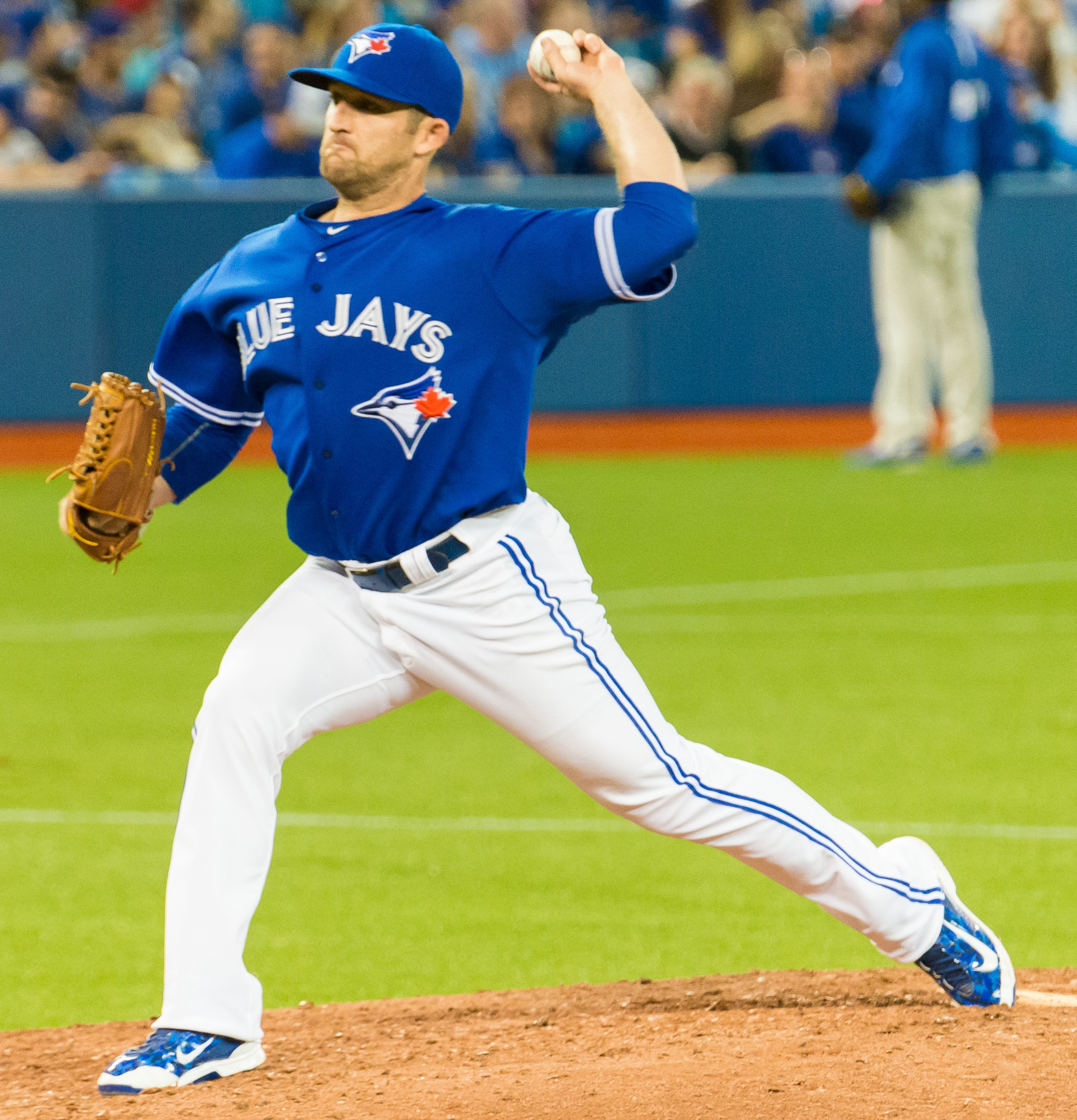
- Colt Hynes pitching on his final MLB appearance game with the Toronto Blue Jays on April 18, 2015
- Pitcher
- Born: June 28, 1985 (age 40); Oklahoma City, Oklahoma, U.S.
- Batted: Left Threw: Left

MLB debut
- July 14, 2013, for the San Diego Padres

Last MLB appearance
- April 18, 2015, for the Toronto Blue Jays

MLB statistics
- Win–loss record: 0–0
- Earned run average: 8.55
- Strikeouts: 17
- Stats at Baseball Reference

Teams
- San Diego Padres (2013); Toronto Blue Jays (2015)

Joshua Colt Hynes (born June 28, 1985) is an American former professional baseball pitcher. He played in Major League Baseball (MLB) for the San Diego Padres and Toronto Blue Jays.

== Early career ==
Hynes graduated Weatherford High School in 2003. He was an All-District selection in his senior year.

He spent two years at North Central Texas College in Gainesville, Texas. In his freshman season, 2004, he helped North Central Texas to an NJCAA Regional appearance. Hynes went 8–3 with a 2.96 ERA and 49 strikeouts. In his sophomore season, Hynes went 6–3 with a 2.70 ERA and 70 strikeouts. He was selected to the All-Conference team in both of his years at North Central Texas.

Hynes played two seasons at Texas Tech University where, in his first season, he went 5–3 with a team-low 2.93 ERA. His two saves were good enough for second place on the team. He saw time as both a reliever and a starter. In 2006, he played collegiate summer baseball with the Brewster Whitecaps of the Cape Cod Baseball League.

== Professional career ==
=== San Diego Padres ===
In 2007, Hynes began his professional career with the Low–A Eugene Emeralds of the Northwest League. He had a 3–2 record with a 1.54 ERA, four saves, and 50 strikeouts in 411/3 innings pitched. His 30 games were all in relief.

Hynes was promoted to the Single–A Fort Wayne Wizards of the Midwest League in 2008. He went 0–2 with a 4.60 ERA and 38 strikeouts in 32 games.

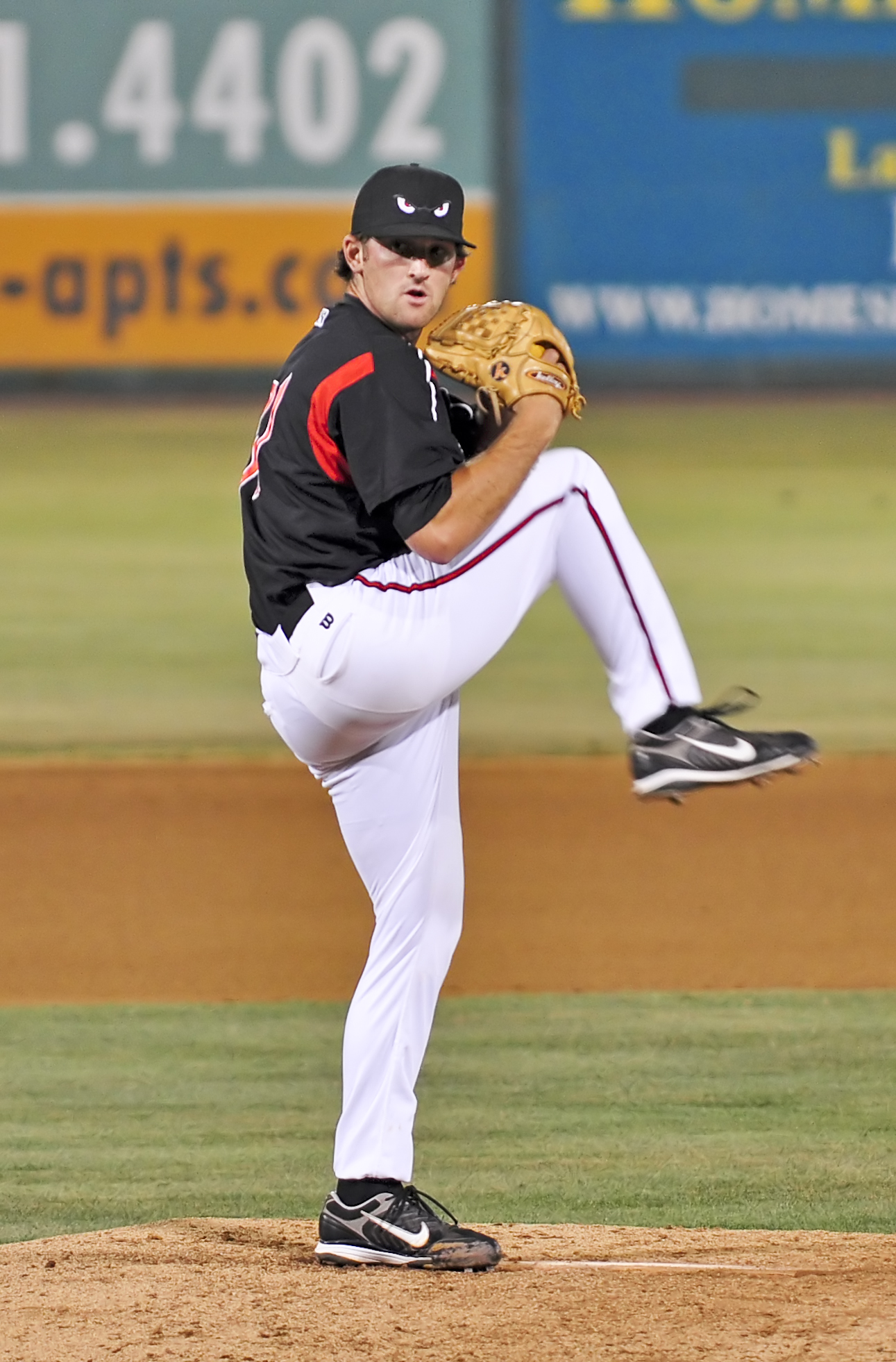
Hynes pitching for the Lake Elsinore Storm in 2009

In 2009, Hynes split the season between the Single–A Fort Wayne Wizards and the High–A Lake Elsinore Storm of the California League. He put together a 2–0 record with a 1.62 ERA in 13 games with Fort Wayne before his promotion to Lake Elsinore. With the Storm, he went 3–3 with a 2.90 ERA giving him a combined record of 5–3 with a 2.62 ERA, two saves, and 61 strikeouts in 752/3 innings pitched.

Hynes made his MLB debut with the Padres on July 14, 2013, pitching the ninth inning of a 10–1 victory against the San Francisco Giants. He appeared in six games for the Padres and was 1–1 with an 11.12 ERA in 52/3 innings. He was designated for assignment on October 25, 2013.

=== Los Angeles Dodgers ===
Hynes was traded to the Cleveland Indians for cash considerations on October 31, 2013. They designated him for assignment on March 30, 2014, and he was traded to the Los Angeles Dodgers for Duke von Schamann on April 6. He was assigned to the Triple-A Albuquerque Isotopes. The Dodgers designated him for assignment on August 10.

=== Toronto Blue Jays ===
On August 13, 2014, Hynes was claimed off waivers by the Toronto Blue Jays and assigned to the Triple-A Buffalo Bisons. He was invited to 2015 spring training, and pitched 12 shutout innings allowing only 3 hits and 2 walks, while striking out 11. His strong performance earned him a role in the bullpen to open the 2015 season. He was optioned Buffalo on April 19. On September 1, Hynes was designated for assignment. He elected free agency on November 6.

On February 12, 2016, Hynes agreed to a minor league contract with the Blue Jays. He started the season with the Double-A New Hampshire Fisher Cats, was promoted to the Buffalo Bisons on April 23, and returned to New Hampshire on April 25.

=== Cleveland Indians ===
On August 4, 2016, Hynes signed a minor league contract with the Cleveland Indians and was assigned to the Triple-A Columbus Clippers.

=== Oakland Athletics ===
On August 31, 2016, Hynes was traded to the Oakland Athletics for Coco Crisp. He was assigned to the Triple-A Nashville Sounds on September 3. Hynes did not appear for the organization before electing free agency following the season on November 7.

=== Los Angeles Dodgers ===
Hynes signed a minor league contract with the Dodgers on February 20, 2017. They assigned him to the Double-A Tulsa Drillers of the Texas League to start the 2017 season. He appeared in 23 games for Tulsa (with four starts) and additional three games for the Oklahoma City Dodgers and was 6–1 with a 3.90 ERA between the two teams. On November 3, 2017, Hynes resigned a minor league deal with the Dodgers, however he was released on February 14, 2018.

=== Retirement ===
On March 10, 2018, Hynes retired from baseball to join the Dodgers' front office as a minor league rehabilitation coordinator.
