= Nick Vincent (baseball) =

American baseball player (born 1986)

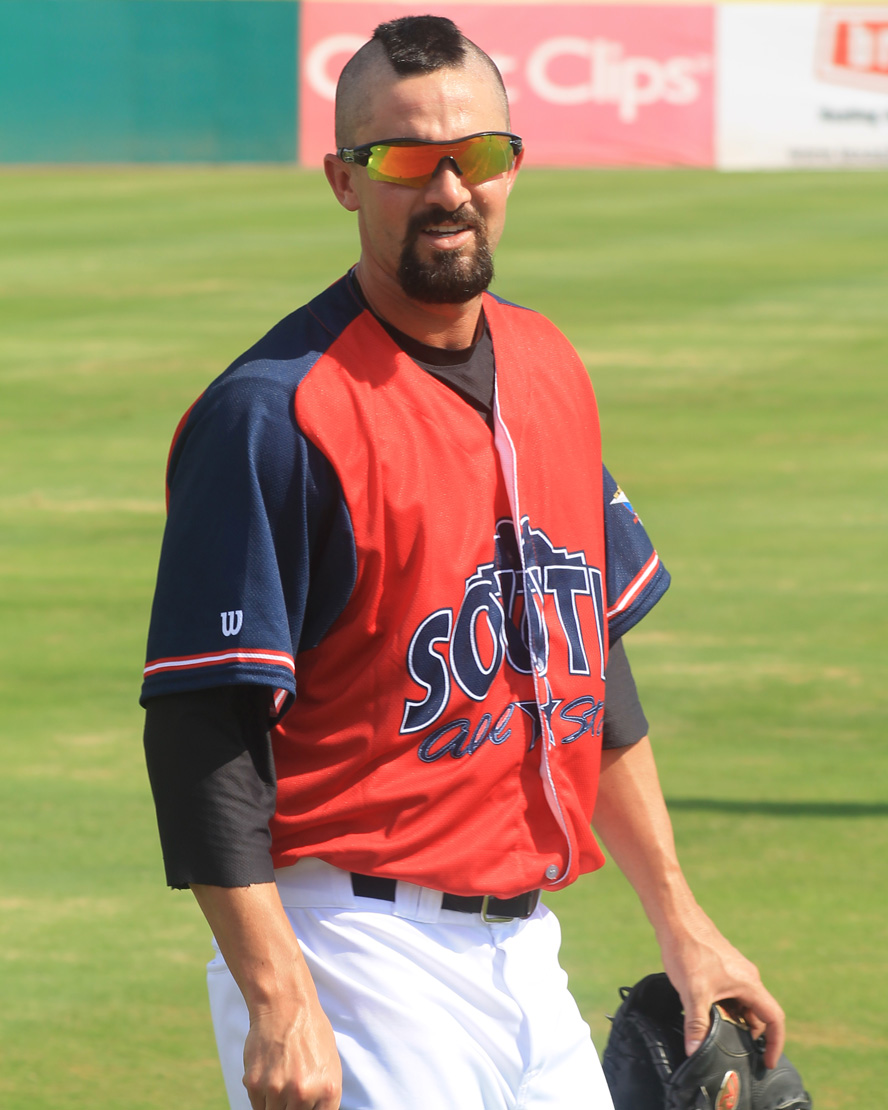
- Vincent in 2011
- Pitcher
- Born: July 12, 1986 (age 40); Poway, California, U.S.
- Batted: Right Threw: Right

MLB debut
- June 26, 2012, for the San Diego Padres

Last MLB appearance
- October 3, 2021, for the Minnesota Twins

MLB statistics
- Win–loss record: 22–23
- Earned run average: 3.30
- Strikeouts: 405
- Stats at Baseball Reference

Teams
- San Diego Padres (2012–2015); Seattle Mariners (2016–2018); San Francisco Giants (2019); Philadelphia Phillies (2019); Miami Marlins (2020); Minnesota Twins (2021)

Nicholas James Vincent (born July 12, 1986) is an American former professional baseball pitcher. He played in Major League Baseball (MLB) for the San Diego Padres, Seattle Mariners, San Francisco Giants, Philadelphia Phillies, Miami Marlins, Minnesota Twins and Atlanta Braves. Vincent was drafted by the Padres in the 18th round of the 2008 Major League Baseball draft, and made his major league debut in 2012.

== High school and college ==
Vincent was born in Poway, California, to Randy and Jill Vincent. He attended Ramona High School (Class of 2004) in Ramona, California, a town in the foothills northeast of San Diego. In 2004 he was 6-6 with a 2.73 ERA, and was named Valley League Pitcher of the Year.

He played college baseball at Palomar College, a junior college, and California State University, Long Beach, where he majored in criminal justice. As a freshman at Palomar in 16 games (15 starts) he was 9-2 with a 1.51 ERA in 101 innings. As a sophomore at Palomar he was 6-3 in 14 starts over 97.1 innings, with a 2.96 ERA. He was named first team All-Pacific Coast League in 2006 and 2007 for Palomar. As a junior at Long Beach State he switched to the bullpen, and in 26 games was 4-0 with two saves and a 1.76 ERA and 33 strikeouts in 30.2 innings.

== Professional career ==
=== San Diego Padres ===
Vincent was drafted by the San Diego Padres in the 18th round (555th overall) of the 2008 Major League Baseball draft. He spent 2009 and 2010 pitching out of the bullpen with the High-A Lake Elsinore Storm of the California League. In 2009 he was second in the league in appearances, with 59. In 2010, Vincent posted a 1.87 earned run average (ERA) in 81 2/3 innings with 76 strikeouts.

He spent 2011 with the Double-A San Antonio Missions, posting a 2.27 ERA, 89 strikeouts, and held opponents to a .196 batting average in 79 1/3 innings over 66 games (leading the league) as a reliever, and was named a Texas League mid-season All Star. The Padres added Vincent to their 40-man roster after the 2011 season.

Vincent suffered a severe high ankle sprain in spring training of 2012, and opened the season on the disabled list before joining the Triple-A Tucson Padres in May. He was first promoted to the big leagues on May 18, 2012, but did not make it into a game before being optioned back to Tucson on May 26. Vincent wasn't throwing well in Tucson and in early June was sent down to San Antonio, where he had a 1.86 ERA in 9 outings. He was then recalled directly to the Padres and made his MLB debut on June 26, 2012, pitching 2 scoreless innings against the Houston Astros. Vincent earned his first big league win two days later, pitching in relief. He was sent back to Tucson on July 5 after allowing runs in back-to-back appearances, but returned on July 16. Vincent pitched scoreless relief in 3 games before being optioned to Tucson on July 22 when Eric Stults came off the disabled list. He came back to San Diego for the remainder of the season on August 18. For the 2012 Padres Vincent was 2-0 in 26 1/3 innings pitched over 27 relief appearances, with a 1.71 ERA and 28 strikeouts.

Vincent was sidelined by inflamed tendons in his forearm in spring training of 2013 and began the season with the Tucson Padres. He was called up on May 30 when Anthony Bass was sent to Triple-A. Vincent pitched four scoreless innings in two appearances before being sent back to Tucson. He returned again on June 11 when Burch Smith was sent down and remained with the Padres for the rest of the season. In 2013 Vincent was 6-3 with one save and pitched in a total of 46 1/3 innings in 45 games with the big league club, posting a 2.14 ERA and 49 strikeouts.

The Padres broke 2014 training camp with Vincent in their bullpen; he had a stretch of 20 consecutive batters retired in April. Vincent was with the Major League club all year except for a six-week trip to the disabled list with shoulder fatigue in June and July. He finished 2014 with a record of 1-2, and with a 3.60 ERA and 62 strikeouts in 55 innings over 63 relief appearances. He stranded 42 of 48 inherited runners (85.7%), the fifth-best rate among National League relievers.

Vincent also began 2015 with the Major League club, but was optioned to Triple-A El Paso on April 10 after the Padres bullpen was used extensively in the first week of the season and required fresh arms. He had two more stints with the Padres in May and June before being called up again on September 1 when rosters expanded. With El Paso in 2015, he was 5-3 with a 3.04 ERA, and had 68 strikeouts in 50.1 innings for a 12.16 strikeouts per 9.0 innings pitched ratio, the highest rate of any Triple-A pitcher in 2015. Vincent finished 2015 with a record of 0-1 and a 2.35 ERA, and 22 strikeouts in 23 innings over 26 relief appearances with the Major League club.

=== Seattle Mariners ===
Vincent was traded to the Seattle Mariners for a player to be named later on March 30, 2016. In his first season with Seattle, in 2016 he went 4-4 with three saves in 60 games with a 3.73 ERA, and struck out 65 in 60 1/3 innings.

In 2017, Vincent appeared in 69 games, recording a record of 3-3 with a 3.20 ERA in 64 2/3 innings, as he had 29 holds (second-most in the major leagues, and the second-most in team history). In 2018, he appeared in 62 games (one start), collecting a record of 4-4 with a 3.99 ERA and 56 strikeouts in 56 1/3 innings. On November 2, 2018, Vincent elected to become a free agent after clearing waivers and being outrighted off the Mariner's 40-man roster.

=== San Francisco Giants ===
On February 21, 2019, Vincent signed a minor league contract with the San Francisco Giants. On July 28, he was designated for assignment. Vincent was released on August 2. With the Giants in 2019 he was 0-2 with a 5.58 ERA over 18 appearances (one start), with 30 strikeouts in 30 2/3 innings.

=== Philadelphia Phillies ===
On August 10, 2019, Vincent signed a minor league contract with the Philadelphia Phillies. He was assigned to the Triple-A Lehigh Valley IronPigs, with whom he was 0-0 with a 1.46 ERA, as in 10 relief appearances he pitched 12 1/3 innings in which he walked one and struck out 13 batters. On September 1, the Phillies selected Vincent's contract. With the Phillies in 2019 he was 1-2 with a 1.93 ERA, as in 14 relief appearances he pitched 14 innings and struck out 17 batters.

=== San Francisco Giants (second stint) ===
On January 31, 2020, Vincent signed a minor league contract with the San Francisco Giants organization. Vincent was released by the Giants on June 26.

=== Miami Marlins ===
On June 29, 2020, Vincent signed with the Miami Marlins organization. On August 3, Vincent was selected to the active roster. In 2020, Vincent pitched to a 4.43 ERA with 17 strikeouts in 22 1/3 innings of work across 21 games.

=== Texas Rangers ===
On February 3, 2021, Vincent signed a minor league contract with the Texas Rangers organization and was invited to Spring Training. On March 26, Vincent was released by the Rangers. On March 28, Vincent re-signed with the Rangers on a new minor league contract. Vincent recorded a 4.11 ERA in 15 games for the Triple-A Round Rock Express before being released by the organization on June 22.

=== Minnesota Twins ===
On June 23, 2021, Vincent signed a minor league contract with the Minnesota Twins organization and was assigned to the Triple-A St. Paul Saints. On August 10, the Twins selected Vincent's contract. Vincent appeared in 2 games for the Twins, giving up 1 run with 4 strikeouts in 4 1/3 innings pitched. On August 18, Vincent was designated for assignment by the Twins. On August 20, Vincent cleared waivers and was assigned outright to the Triple-A St. Paul Saints. Vincent was re-selected to the active roster on September 17. Vincent was outrighted off of the 40-man roster on October 8.

=== Atlanta Braves ===
On March 20, 2022, Vincent signed a minor league deal with the Atlanta Braves. He was released on June 20, 2022.

=== Detroit Tigers ===
On July 8, 2022, Vincent signed a minor league contract with the Detroit Tigers. In 28 appearances for the Triple-A Toledo Mud Hens, he posted a 5-0 record and 0.61 ERA with 28 strikeouts and 5 saves across 29 2/3 innings pitched. Vincent elected free agency following the season on November 10.

== Personal life ==
Vincent plays as much golf as possible during the off-season and is a regular at the San Vicente Golf Resort in Ramona.

Vincent and his wife, Jackie, have one daughter, Hazel, who was born in October 2017.
