= Eric Stults =

American baseball player (born 1979)

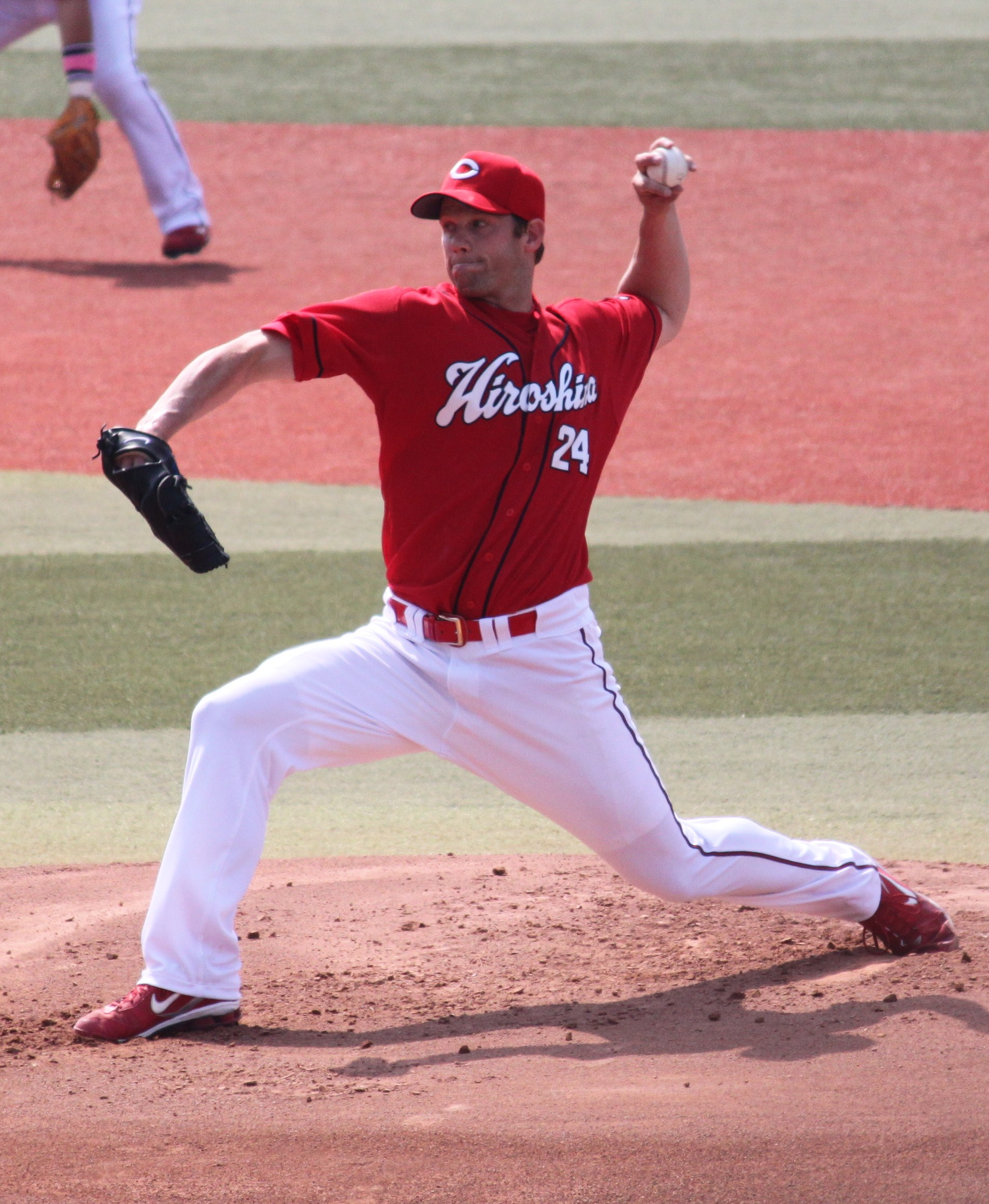
- Stults with the Hiroshima Toyo Carp in 2010
- Pitcher
- Born: December 9, 1979 (age 46); Argos, Indiana, U.S.
- Batted: Left Threw: Left

Professional debut
- MLB: September 5, 2006, for the Los Angeles Dodgers
- NPB: April 23, 2010, for the Hiroshima Toyo Carp

Last appearance
- MLB: May 26, 2015, for the Atlanta Braves
- NPB: September 18, 2010, for the Hiroshima Toyo Carp

MLB statistics
- Win–loss record: 36–48
- Earned run average: 4.24
- Strikeouts: 433

NPB statistics
- Win–loss record: 6–10
- Earned run average: 5.07
- Strikeouts: 87
- Stats at Baseball Reference

Teams
- Los Angeles Dodgers (2006–2009); Hiroshima Toyo Carp (2010); Colorado Rockies (2011); Chicago White Sox (2012); San Diego Padres (2012–2014); Atlanta Braves (2015)

Eric William Stults (born December 9, 1979) is an American former professional baseball pitcher. He played in Major League Baseball (MLB) for the Los Angeles Dodgers, Colorado Rockies, Chicago White Sox, San Diego Padres, and Atlanta Braves, and in Nippon Professional Baseball (NPB) for the Hiroshima Toyo Carp.

== College career ==
Stults played for Bethel College in Mishawaka, Indiana. Stults pitched and played center field for Bethel, which won the 2002 National Christian College Athletic Association Division I championship, posting a 10–1 record that season, and also played basketball at Bethel.

== Professional career ==
=== Los Angeles Dodgers ===
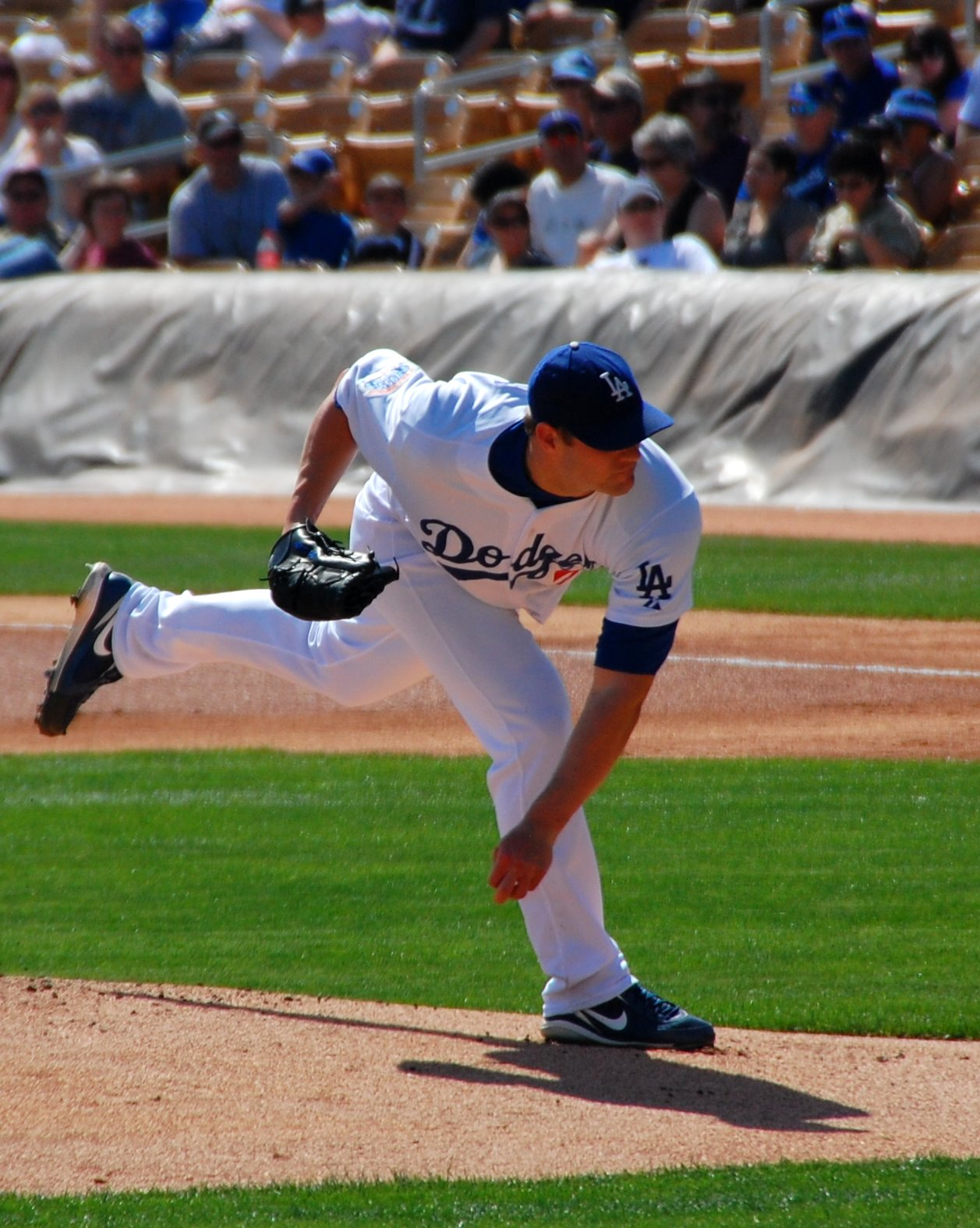
Stults with the Los Angeles Dodgers in 2010

Stults was selected by the Los Angeles Dodgers in the 15th round of the 2002 Major League Baseball draft.

In 2002, he pitched for the Vero Beach Dodgers and had a record of 3–1 with an ERA of 3.00 in 13 appearances (6 starts). In 2003, he was 3–4 with a 4.97 ERA in 7 starts for the Jacksonville Suns. In 2004, he pitched for the Columbus Catfish of the South Atlantic League and had a record of 1–2, ERA of 2.49 in 12 appearances. He also pitched in 7 games for Vero Beach that year. In 2005, he alternated between Jacksonville and the Las Vegas 51s, he was 4–3, 3.31 in 12 starts for Jacksonville and 3–7, 6.58 in 14 starts for Las Vegas. In 2006, with Las Vegas he was 10–11 with a 4.23 ERA in 26 starts.

Stults made his Major League Baseball debut with the Dodgers on September 5, 2006, against the Milwaukee Brewers at Miller Park in Milwaukee. He pitched three innings and gave up three earned runs. He earned his first Major League victory on September 10 at Shea Stadium as he held the New York Mets to just one run and two hits over 6.0 innings and 86 pitches, walking two and struck out three in the Dodgers' 9–1 win.

In 2007, he returned to the starting rotation with the Las Vegas 51s. He was called up by the Dodgers to start the game against the Colorado Rockies on August 17, and struck out 9 batters en route to his first victory in 2007 after having thrown 7 innings and giving up only 2 runs, 2 hits, and a walk.

After an inconsistent stay in the majors in 2007, Stults was a long shot to make the Dodgers in spring training 2008 and was sent to Triple-A Las Vegas. He was called up and made his first start with the Dodgers on June 19, 2008, replacing injured Dodger ace Brad Penny in the starting rotation after Penny was placed on the disabled list.

On June 25, 2008, Stults pitched his first Major League shutout, as well as complete game—as the Dodgers blanked the visiting Chicago White Sox, 5–0.

Early in the 2009 season, Stults replaced injured starting pitcher Hiroki Kuroda. He made the best start of his career against the San Francisco Giants on May 9, 2009. At Dodger Stadium Stults threw a complete-game shutout, throwing 123 pitches. He struck out 5, walked none, and allowed only four hits.

On May 15, 2009, Stults injured his thumb while making a toss on a bunt attempt by the Florida Marlins' Hanley Ramírez. Stults would make 2 more starts before going on the disabled list. On July 1, Stults was optioned to the Triple-A Albuquerque Isotopes. He pitched well with the Isotopes, before getting called up to make a spot start on August 9 against the Atlanta Braves. Stults was optioned back to Albuquerque on August 13 and finished the season there.

=== Hiroshima Toyo Carp ===
On March 30, 2010, Stults was sold to the Hiroshima Toyo Carp of Nippon Professional Baseball. He was 6–10 with a 5.07 ERA in 21 starts in Japan.

=== Colorado Rockies ===
On November 24, 2010, Stults signed a minor league contract with the Colorado Rockies. He had his contract purchased on July 3, 2011. He appeared in six games for Colorado, recording a 6.00 ERA in 12 innings, before being designated for assignment on July 25. He cleared waivers and was outrighted to Triple-A Colorado Springs Sky Sox on July 27. He elected free agency on November 2.

=== Chicago White Sox ===
On December 1, 2011, he signed a minor league contract with an invite to spring training. Stults was called up on May 7, 2012. He made two appearances for the White Sox before being designated for assignment on May 15.

=== San Diego Padres ===
On May 17, 2012, Stults was claimed off waivers by the San Diego Padres. He made his first start on May 19. Stults went on the disabled list on June 6 with a strained left lat after compiling a 3.19 ERA in four starts, and he returned to the Padres on July 22 after making rehab starts with the Tucson Padres. After pitching out of the bullpen, he rejoined the starting rotation on August 6. He finished the season with an 8–3 record and 2.91 ERA in 20 games and 15 starts.

Stults had 33 starts for the Padres in 2013, going 11–13 with a 3.93 ERA, striking out 131 in 203.2 innings. He led the team in wins, losses, complete games (2), innings pitched and strikeouts. After the season, Stults re-signed with San Diego to a one-year deal worth $2.75 million. Stults was designated for assignment by the Padres on November 3, 2014. He cleared waivers and elected free agency following the season.

=== Atlanta Braves ===
On January 29, 2015, Stults signed a minor league deal with the Atlanta Braves. The team announced that Stults had made the Opening Day roster on April 4. Stults struggled to a 1–4 record and 5.36 ERA before he was replaced in the rotation by Williams Pérez on May 20. Due to Alex Wood's illness, Stults made one final start for the team just two days later against the Milwaukee Brewers. He pitched 3 2/3 innings, yielding three hits, five walks, and seven runs.

=== Los Angeles Dodgers (second stint) ===
On May 27, 2015, he was traded to the Los Angeles Dodgers (with Alberto Callaspo, Ian Thomas and Juan Jaime) in exchange for Juan Uribe and Chris Withrow. The Dodgers promptly designated him for assignment. He cleared waivers and accepted an outright assignment to the Double-A Tulsa Drillers on May 30. Stults made eight starts (and two relief appearances) for Tulsa and six starts for the Triple-A Oklahoma City Dodgers and was 6–5 with a 3.30 ERA. He elected free agency on October 13.

== Pitching style ==
Stults threw three pitches regularly and two infrequently. His most common pitch was a four-seam fastball averaging about 87-90 mph, followed by a changeup (79–81) and slider (80–84). Less commonly, he threw a slow curveball (average about 70 mph), and rarely, a two-seam fastball. To right-handers, Stults mainly threw a combination of fastballs and changeups, with occasional sliders. When facing left-handers, he replaced the slider with a changeup.

== Personal life ==
He and his wife Stephanie have two daughters, Madeline and Hallie, and a son, Luke.
