= 2013 Washington Nationals season =

2013 Washington Nationals
- League: National League
- Division: East
- Ballpark: Nationals Park
- City: Washington, D.C.
- Record: 86–76 (.531)
- Divisional place: 2nd
- Owners: Lerner Enterprises
- General managers: Mike Rizzo
- Managers: Davey Johnson
- Television: MASN; WUSA (Bob Carpenter, FP Santangelo)
- Radio: WJFK 106.7 FM; Washington Nationals Radio Network (Charlie Slowes, Dave Jageler)

The 2013 Washington Nationals season was the Nationals' ninth season for the baseball franchise of Major League Baseball in the District of Columbia, the sixth season at Nationals Park, and the 45th since the original team was started in Montreal, Quebec, Canada.

The Nationals finished the year second place in the National League East with an 86–76 record, but were unable to return to the postseason after their division-winning 2012 campaign. The 2013 season was also the last with manager Davey Johnson, who retired following the end of the season.

== Offseason ==
On November 29, 2012, the Nationals traded minor-leaguer Alex Meyer to the Minnesota Twins for Denard Span.

On January 16, 2013, Washington took part in a three-team trade in which the Oakland Athletics sent A. J. Cole, Blake Treinen, and a player to be named later to the Nationals, the Nationals sent Michael Morse to the Seattle Mariners, and the Mariners sent John Jaso to the Athletics. The Athletics sent minor-leaguer Ian Krol to the Nationals on March 20, 2013, to complete the trade.

== Spring training ==
The Nationals held their 2013 spring training in Viera, Florida, with home games played at Space Coast Stadium.

== Season standings ==
=== National League East ===
NL East
Team	W	L	Pct.	GB	Home	Road
Atlanta Braves	96	66	.593	—	56‍–‍25	40‍–‍41
Washington Nationals	86	76	.531	10	47‍–‍34	39‍–‍42
New York Mets	74	88	.457	22	33‍–‍48	41‍–‍40
Philadelphia Phillies	73	89	.451	23	43‍–‍38	30‍–‍51
Miami Marlins	62	100	.383	34	36‍–‍45	26‍–‍55

=== National League Wild Card ===
Division winners
Team	W	L	Pct.
St. Louis Cardinals	97	65	.599
Atlanta Braves	96	66	.593
Los Angeles Dodgers	92	70	.568

Wild Card teams (Top 2 teams qualify for postseason)
Team	W	L	Pct.	GB
Pittsburgh Pirates	94	68	.580	+4
Cincinnati Reds	90	72	.556	—
Washington Nationals	86	76	.531	4
Arizona Diamondbacks	81	81	.500	9
San Francisco Giants	76	86	.469	14
San Diego Padres	76	86	.469	14
Colorado Rockies	74	88	.457	16
New York Mets	74	88	.457	16
Milwaukee Brewers	74	88	.457	16
Philadelphia Phillies	73	89	.451	17
Chicago Cubs	66	96	.407	24
Miami Marlins	62	100	.383	28

== Record vs. opponents ==
2013 National League record Source: MLB Standings Grid – 2013
Team	AZ	ATL	CHC	CIN	COL	LAD	MIA	MIL	NYM	PHI	PIT	SD	SF	STL	WSH	AL
Arizona	—	2–4	4–3	3–4	12–7	10–9	4–2	6–1	3–4	3–4	3–3	7–12	7–12	4–3	2–4	11–9
Atlanta	4–2	—	5–1	4–3	6–1	5–2	13–6	2–4	10–9	11–8	4–3	1–5	3–4	4–3	13–6	11–9
Chicago	3–4	1–5	—	5–14	3–3	1–6	4–3	6–13	3–3	3–3	7–12	3–4	4–3	7–12	3–4	13–7
Cincinnati	4–3	3–4	14–5	—	2–4	4–3	6–1	10–9	4–2	4–2	8–11	3–3	6–1	8–11	3–4	11–9
Colorado	7–12	1–6	3–3	4–2	—	10–9	3–4	4–2	3–4	3–4	4–2	12–7	9–10	3–4	3–4	5–15
Los Angeles	9–10	2–5	6–1	3–4	9–10	—	5–2	4–2	5–1	5–2	4–2	11–8	8–11	4–3	5–1	12–8
Miami	2–4	6–13	3–4	1–6	4–3	2–5	—	1–5	11–8	7–12	2–4	3–4	4–3	2–4	5–14	9–11
Milwaukee	1–6	4–2	13–6	9–10	2–4	2–4	5–1	—	4–3	5–2	7–12	3–4	5–2	5–14	3–4	6–14
New York	4–3	9–10	3–3	2–4	4–3	1–5	8–11	3–4	—	10–9	2–5	4–3	4–2	2–5	7–12	11–9
Philadelphia	4–3	8–11	3–3	2–4	4–3	2–5	12–7	2–5	9–10	—	3–4	4–2	3–3	2–5	8–11	7–13
Pittsburgh	3–3	3–4	12–7	11–8	2–4	2–4	4–2	12–7	5–2	4–3	—	3–4	4–3	10–9	4–3	15–5
San Diego	12–7	5–1	4–3	3–3	7–12	8–11	4–3	4–3	3–4	2–4	4–3	—	8–11	2–4	2–5	8–12
San Francisco	12–7	4–3	3–4	1–6	10–9	11–8	3–4	2–5	2–4	3–3	3–4	11–8	—	2–4	3–3	6–14
St. Louis	3–4	3–4	12–7	11–8	4–3	3–4	4–2	14–5	5–2	5–2	9–10	4–2	4–2	—	6–0	10–10
Washington	4–2	6–13	4–3	4–3	4–3	1–5	14–5	4–3	12–7	11–8	3–4	5–2	3–3	0–6	—	11–9

=== Opening Day lineup ===
Opening Day Starters
Name	Position
Denard Span	Center fielder
Jayson Werth	Right fielder
Bryce Harper	Left fielder
Ryan Zimmerman	Third baseman
Adam LaRoche	First baseman
Ian Desmond	Shortstop
Danny Espinosa	Second baseman
Wilson Ramos	Catcher
Stephen Strasburg	Starting pitcher

=== Notable transactions ===
- June 11, 2013: The Nationals traded Henry Rodriguez to the Chicago Cubs for minor-leaguer Ian Dickson.
- July 8, 2013: The Nationals traded minor-leaguer Ivan Pineyro and a player to be named later to the Chicago Cubs for Scott Hairston, cash, and a player to be named later.
- July 10, 2013: The Nationals traded a player to be named later to the Pittsburgh Pirates for Brian Jeroloman. Late in the day, the Nationals sent Brian Bocock to the Pirates to complete the trade.
- August 19, 2013: The Nationals purchased David DeJesus from the Chicago Cubs.
- August 23, 2013: The Nationals traded Kurt Suzuki to the Oakland Athletics for minor-leaguer Dakota Bacus and traded David DeJesus to the Tampa Bay Rays for a player to be named later; the Rays sent minor-leaguer Matthew Spann to the Nationals on September 19, 2013, to complete the trade.

=== Major league debuts ===
- Erik Davis (June 2, 2013)
- Taylor Jordan (June 29, 2013)
- Nate Karns (May 28, 2013)
- Jeff Kobernus (May 25, 2013)
- Ian Krol (June 5, 2013)
- Anthony Rendon (April 21, 2013)
- Tanner Roark (August 7, 2013)
- Zach Walters (September 6, 2013)

=== Culture and entertainment ===
In January 2013 the Nationals announced that they would add a fifth Racing President to the Presidents Race that took place during every home game. The new president, William Howard Taft ("Bill"), joined the original four Racing Presidents – George Washington ("George"), Thomas Jefferson ("Tom"), Abraham Lincoln ("Abe"), and Theodore Roosevelt ("Teddy") – all of whom had raced since 2006. The addition of Bill honored the real President Taft, who started the tradition of the presidential ceremonial first pitch in 1910 at a Washington Senators game at Griffith Stadium in Washington, D.C., and also is widely credited with having accidentally created the seventh-inning stretch while attending a game. Bill debuted in the Opening Day Presidents Race on April 1, 2013, and won his first race on May 11, going on to win 11 races before the season ended.

=== Attendance ===
The Nationals drew 2,652,422 fans at Nationals Park in 2013. Only the 2,731,993 they drew in their first season in Washington in 2005 exceeded it, and it placed them sixth in attendance for the season among the 15 National League teams, their highest attendance ranking for a single season at the time. Their highest attendance at a home game was on April 1, when they drew 45,274 for a game against the Miami Marlins on Opening Day, while their lowest was 24,394 for a game against the Marlins on August 28. Their average home attendance was 32,746 per game, second-highest since their arrival in Washington.

=== Game log ===
Legend
	Nationals win
	Nationals loss
	Postponement
**Bold**	Nationals team member

2013 game log
April (13–14)

#	Date	Opponent	Score	Win	Loss	Save	Attendance	Record
1	April 1	Marlins	2 – 0	**Strasburg** (1-0)	Nolasco (0-1)	**Soriano** (1)	45,274	1-0
2	April 3	Marlins	3 – 0	**González** (1-0)	Slowey (0-1)	**Soriano** (2)	26,269	2-0
3	April 4	Marlins	6 – 1	**Zimmermann** (1-0)	LeBlanc (0-1)		25,123	3-0
4	April 5	@ Reds	15 – 0	Bailey (1-0)	**Haren** (0-1)		28,102	3-1
5	April 6	@ Reds	7 – 6 (11)	**Stammen** (1-0)	Hoover (0-2)		34,762	4-1
6	April 7	@ Reds	6 – 3	Cueto (1-0)	**Strasburg** (1-1)	Chapman (2)	32,514	4-2
7	April 9	White Sox	8 – 7	**Stammen** (2-0)	Peavy (1-1)	**Soriano** (3)	24,412	5-2
8	April 10	White Sox	5 – 2	**Zimmermann** (2-0)	Floyd (0-2)	**Soriano** (4)	24,586	6-2
9	April 11	White Sox	7 – 4	**Haren** (1-1)	Axelrod (0-1)	**Soriano** (5)	24,785	7-2
10	April 12	Braves	6 – 4 (10)	O'Flaherty (2-0)	**Stammen** (2-1)	Kimbrel (5)	33,130	7-3
11	April 13	Braves	3 – 1	Hudson (2-0)	**Strasburg** (1-2)	Kimbrel (6)	41,992	7-4
12	April 14	Braves	9 – 0	Maholm (3-0)	**González** (1-1)		39,389	7-5
13	April 15	@ Marlins	10 – 3	**Zimmermann** (3-0)	LeBlanc (0-3)		15,933	8-5
14	April 16	@ Marlins	8 – 2	Sanabia (2-1)	**Haren** (1-2)		16,200	8-6
15	April 17	@ Marlins	6 – 1	**Detwiler** (1-0)	Nolasco (0-2)		22,302	9-6
16	April 19	@ Mets	7 – 1	Harvey (4-0)	**Strasburg** (1-3)		26,675	9-7
17	April 20	@ Mets	7 – 6	**Clippard** (1-0)	Edgin (0-1)	**Soriano** (6)	24,325	10-7
18	April 21	@ Mets	2 – 0	Gee (1-3)	**Zimmermann** (3-1)	Parnell (2)	26,225	10-8
19	April 22	Cardinals	3 – 2	Miller (3-1)	**Haren** (1-3)	Mujica (2)	27,263	10-9
20	April 23	Cardinals	2 – 0	Wainwright (4-1)	**Detwiler** (1-1)	Mujica (3)	29,986	10-10
21	April 24	Cardinals	4 – 2	García (2-1)	**Strasburg** (1-4)	Mujica (4)	33,694	10-11
22	April 25	Reds	8 – 1	**González** (2-1)	Arroyo (2-2)		24,748	11-11
23	April 26	Reds	1 – 0	**Zimmermann** (4-1)	Bailey (1-2)		32,995	12-11
24	April 27	Reds	6 – 3	**Haren** (2-3)	Leake (1-1)	**Soriano** (7)	38,903	13-11
25	April 28	Reds	5 – 2	Cingrani (2-0)	**Detwiler** (1-2)	Chapman (5)	36,457	13-12
26	April 29	@ Braves	3 – 2	Walden (1-0)	**Clippard** (1-1)	Kimbrel (9)	22,870	13-13
27	April 30	@ Braves	8 – 1	Hudson (3-1)	**González** (2-2)		19,243	13-14

May (15–13)

#	Date	Opponent	Score	Win	Loss	Save	Attendance	Record
28	May 1	@ Braves	2 – 0	**Zimmermann** (5-1)	Maholm (3-3)	**Soriano** (8)	22,460	14-14
29	May 2	@ Braves	3 – 1	**Haren** (3-3)	Medlen (1-4)	**Soriano** (9)	19,806	15-14
30	May 3	@ Pirates	3 – 1	Burnett (3-2)	**Detwiler** (1-3)	Grilli (12)	26,404	15-15
31	May 4	@ Pirates	5 – 4	**Clippard** (2-1)	Watson (1-1)	**Soriano** (10)	29,975	16-15
32	May 5	@ Pirates	6 – 2	**González** (3-2)	Rodríguez (2-2)		24,186	17-15
–	May 7	Tigers	Postponed (rain) Rescheduled for May 9					
33	May 8	Tigers	3 – 1	**Zimmermann** (6-1)	Sánchez (3-3)	**Soriano** (11)	34,893	18-15
34	May 9	Tigers	5 – 4	**Haren** (4-3)	Fister (4-1)	**Soriano** (12)	28,742	19-15
35	May 10	Cubs	7 – 3	**Detwiler** (2-3)	Samardzija (1-5)		37,191	20-15
36	May 11	Cubs	8 – 2	Jackson (1-5)	**Strasburg** (1-5)		37,116	20-16
37	May 12	Cubs	2 – 1	Russell (1-0)	**Soriano** (0-1)	Gregg (6)	38,788	20-17
38	May 13	@ Dodgers	6 – 2	**Zimmermann** (7-1)	Beckett (0-5)		32,337	21-17
39	May 14	@ Dodgers	2 – 0	Kershaw (4-2)	**Haren** (4-4)	Jansen (2)	51,729	21-18
40	May 15	@ Dodgers	3 – 1	Greinke (2-0)	**Detwiler** (2-4)	League (9)	36,721	21-19
41	May 16	@ Padres	6 – 2	**Strasburg** (2-5)	Vólquez (3-4)		24,234	22-19
42	May 17	@ Padres	6 – 5 (10)	**Soriano** (1-1)	Street (0-3)	**Storen** (1)	29,898	23-19
43	May 18	@ Padres	2 – 1	Stults (4-3)	**Zimmermann** (7-2)	Street (10)	33,646	23-20
44	May 19	@ Padres	13 – 4	Cashner (3-2)	**Haren** (4-5)		27,080	23-21
45	May 20	@ Giants	8 – 0	Vogelsong (2-4)	**Duke** (0-1)		41,963	23-22
46	May 21	@ Giants	4 – 2 (10)	Affeldt (1-0)	**Maya** (0-1)		41,642	23-23
47	May 22	@ Giants	2 – 1 (10)	**Clippard** (3-1)	Affeldt (1-1)	**Soriano** (13)	41,175	24-23
48	May 24	Phillies	5 – 2	**Zimmermann** (8-2)	Kendrick (4-3)	**Soriano** (14)	28,980	25-23
49	May 25	Phillies	5 – 3	Durbin (1-0)	**Storen** (0-1)	Papelbon (9)	38,012	25-24
50	May 26	Phillies	6 – 1	**Strasburg** (3-5)	Hamels (1-8)		39,033	26-24
51	May 27	Orioles	6 – 2	Hammel (7-2)	**González** (3-3)		41,260	26-25
52	May 28	Orioles	9 – 3	**Duke** (1-1)	Gausman (0-2)		35,664	27-25
53	May 29	@ Orioles	9 – 6	Johnson (1-1)	**Zimmermann** (8-3)	Johnson (16)	39,129	27-26
54	May 30	@ Orioles	2 – 0	García (2-2)	**Haren** (4-6)	Johnson (17)	30,665	27-27
55	May 31	@ Braves	3 – 2	**Stammen** (3-1)	Teherán (3-2)	**Soriano** (15)	36,650	28-27

June (13–13)

#	Date	Opponent	Score	Win	Loss	Save	Attendance	Record
56	June 1	@ Braves	2 – 1 (10)	Walden (2-1)	**Rodríguez** (0-1)		46,910	28-28
57	June 2	@ Braves	6 – 3	Maholm (7-4)	**Karns** (0-1)	Kimbrel (17)	30,134	28-29
58	June 4	Mets	3 – 2	**Clippard** (4-1)	Parnell (4-2)		31,473	29-29
59	June 5	Mets	10 – 1	Gee (4-6)	**Haren** (4-7)		36,155	29-30
–	June 6	Mets	Postponed (rain) Rescheduled for July 26 as part of a doubleheader					
–	June 7	Twins	Postponed (rain) Rescheduled for June 9 as part of a doubleheader					
60	June 8	Twins	4 – 3 (11)	Roenicke (2-1)	**Stammen** (3-2)	Perkins (13)	41,587	29-31
61	June 9 (1)	Twins	7 – 0	**Zimmermann** (9-3)	Diamond (4-5)		38,516	30-31
62	June 9 (2)	Twins	5 – 4	**Clippard** (5-1)	Swarzak (1-2)	**Soriano** (16)	27,949	31-31
63	June 11	@ Rockies	8 – 3	Chacín (4-3)	**Haren** (4-8)		33,736	31-32
64	June 12	@ Rockies	5 – 1	**Ohlendorf** (1-0)	de la Rosa (7-4)		30,304	32-32
65	June 13	@ Rockies	5 – 4	**Stammen** (4-2)	Bélisle (4-3)	**Soriano** (17)	37,017	33-32
66	June 14	@ Indians	2 – 1	Smith (3-0)	**Abad** (0-1)		30,824	33-33
67	June 15	@ Indians	7 – 6	**Storen** (1-1)	Pestano (1-2)	**Soriano** (18)	33,307	34-33
68	June 16	@ Indians	2 – 0	Kluber (5-4)	**Strasburg** (3-6)	Pestano (1)	21,845	34-34
69	June 17	@ Phillies	5 – 4	Papelbon (1-0)	**Abad** (0-2)		44,990	34-35
70	June 18	@ Phillies	4 – 2	Lee (9-2)	**Detwiler** (2-5)	Papelbon (14)	38,188	34-36
71	June 19	@ Phillies	6 – 2 (11)	**Storen** (2-1)	Stutes (2-1)		39,594	35-36
72	June 20	Rockies	5 – 1	**Zimmermann** (10-3)	Oswalt (0-1)		31,927	36-36
73	June 21	Rockies	2 – 1	**Strasburg** (4-6)	Corpas (0-2)	**Soriano** (19)	34,917	37-36
74	June 22	Rockies	7 – 1	Chacín (6-3)	**Haren** (4-9)		35,787	37-37
75	June 23	Rockies	7 – 6	de la Rosa (8-4)	**Detwiler** (2-6)	Brothers (4)	39,307	37-38
76	June 25	Diamondbacks	7 – 5	**González** (4-3)	Cahill (3-9)	**Soriano** (20)	30,287	38-38
77	June 26	Diamondbacks	3 – 2	**Zimmermann** (11-3)	Miley (4-7)	**Soriano** (21)	31,172	39-38
78	June 27	Diamondbacks	3 – 2 (11)	Collmenter (4-0)	**Stammen** (4-3)	Bell (14)	32,948	39-39
79	June 28	@ Mets	6 – 4	**Clippard** (6-1)	Parnell (5-4)	**Storen** (2)	28,363	40-39
80	June 29	@ Mets	5 – 1	Gee (6-7)	**Jordan** (0-1)		26,426	40-40
81	June 30	@ Mets	13 – 2	**González** (5-3)	Wheeler (1-1)		33,366	41-40

July (11–16)

#	Date	Opponent	Score	Win	Loss	Save	Attendance	Record
82	July 1	Brewers	10 – 5	**Zimmermann** (12-3)	Gallardo (6-8)		24,889	42-40
83	July 2	Brewers	4 – 0	Henderson (3-2)	**Storen** (2-2)		24,897	42-41
84	July 3	Brewers	4 – 1	Lohse (4-6)	**Detwiler** (2-7)	Rodríguez (7)	28,920	42-42
85	July 4	Brewers	8 – 5	**Storen** (3-2)	Gorzelanny (1-1)	**Soriano** (22)	33,221	43-42
86	July 5	Padres	8 – 5	**González** (6-3)	Cashner (5-4)	**Soriano** (23)	33,979	44-42
87	July 6	Padres	5 – 4	**Ohlendorf** (2-0)	Vincent (2-1)	**Soriano** (24)	33,314	45-42
88	July 7	Padres	11 – 7	**Strasburg** (5-6)	Erlin (1-2)		31,483	46-42
89	July 8	@ Phillies	3 – 2	Lannan (2-3)	**Haren** (4-10)	Papelbon (19)	33,061	46-43
90	July 9	@ Phillies	4 – 2	Hamels (4-11)	**Jordan** (0-2)	Bastardo (2)	33,502	46-44
91	July 10	@ Phillies	5 – 1	**González** (7-3)	Lee (10-3)		34,513	47-44
92	July 11	@ Phillies	3 – 1	Kendrick (8-6)	**Zimmermann** (12-4)	Papelbon (20)	40,086	47-45
93	July 12	@ Marlins	8 – 3	Eovaldi (2-0)	**Strasburg** (5-7)		16,861	47-46
94	July 13	@ Marlins	2 – 1 (10)	Cishek (3-4)	**Stammen** (4-4)		20,057	47-47
95	July 14	@ Marlins	5 – 2 (10)	**Stammen** (5-4)	Cishek (3-5)	**Soriano** (25)	19,766	48-47
**All–Star Break (July 15–18)**
96	July 19	Dodgers	3 – 2	Belisario (4-5)	**Soriano** (1-2)	Jansen (10)	39,146	48-48
97	July 20	Dodgers	3 – 1 (10)	Withrow (1-0)	**Stammen** (5-5)	Jansen (11)	41,816	48-49
98	July 21	Dodgers	9 – 2	Kershaw (9-6)	**Zimmermann** (12-5)		34,758	48-50
99	July 22	Pirates	6 – 5	Morton (2-2)	**Haren** (4-11)	Mazzaro (1)	29,200	48-51
100	July 23	Pirates	5 – 1	Cole (5-3)	**Jordan** (0-3)		32,976	48-52
101	July 24	Pirates	4 – 2	Liriano (10-4)	**Strasburg** (5-8)	Melançon (3)	33,636	48-53
102	July 25	Pirates	9 – 7	**Krol** (1-0)	Morris (4-4)		38,862	49-53
103	July 26 (1)	Mets	11 – 0	Mejía (1-0)	**Zimmermann** (12-6)		33,858	49-54
104	July 26 (2)	Mets	2 – 1	**Soriano** (2-2)	Hawkins (3-2)		33,689	50-54
105	July 27	Mets	4 – 1	**Haren** (5-11)	Gee (7-8)	**Soriano** (26)	37,464	51-54
106	July 28	Mets	14 – 1	**Jordan** (1-3)	Torres (1-2)		31,467	52-54
107	July 30	@ Tigers	5 – 1	Sánchez (9-7)	**Strasburg** (5-9)		41,880	52-55
108	July 31	@ Tigers	11 – 1	Verlander (11-8)	**González** (7-4)		40,894	52-56

August (16–11)

#	Date	Opponent	Score	Win	Loss	Save	Attendance	Record
109	August 2	@ Brewers	4 – 1	**Zimmermann** (13-6)	Fígaro (1-3)	**Soriano** (27)	34,824	53-56
110	August 3	@ Brewers	3 – 0	**Haren** (6-11)	Hand (0-3)	**Soriano** (28)	35,690	54-56
111	August 4	@ Brewers	8 – 5	Axford (5-4)	**Abad** (0-3)	Henderson (15)	35,055	54-57
112	August 5	Braves	3 – 2	Carpenter (3-0)	**Clippard** (6-2)	Walden (1)	33,002	54-58
113	August 6	Braves	2 – 1	Teherán (9-5)	**González** (7-5)	Kimbrel (35)	30,875	54-59
114	August 7	Braves	6 – 3	Medlen (9-10)	**Mattheus** (0-1)	Kimbrel (36)	29,114	54-60
115	August 9	Phillies	9 – 2	**Haren** (7-11)	Lannan (3-5)		27,831	55-60
116	August 10	Phillies	8 – 5	**Roark** (1-0)	Diekman (0-3)	**Soriano** (29)	32,676	56-60
117	August 11	Phillies	6 – 0	**Strasburg** (6-9)	Kendrick (10-9)		32,355	57-60
118	August 13	Giants	4 – 2	**Roark** (2-0)	Moscoso (1-1)	**Soriano** (30)	27,304	58-60
119	August 14	Giants	6 – 5	**Zimmermann** (14-6)	Lincecum (6-12)	**Soriano** (31)	30,657	59-60
120	August 15	Giants	4 – 3	López (2-2)	**Soriano** (2-3)	Romo (29)	36,719	59-61
121	August 16	@ Braves	3 – 2 (10)	Downs (4-3)	**Krol** (1-1)		35,663	59-62
122	August 17	@ Braves	8 – 7 (15)	**Stammen** (6-5)	Medlen (10-11)	**Haren** (1)	40,866	60-62
123	August 18	@ Braves	2 – 1	Teherán (10-6)	**González** (7-6)	Kimbrel (39)	27,221	60-63
124	August 19	@ Cubs	11 – 1	Samardzija (7-11)	**Zimmermann** (14-7)		31,290	60-64
125	August 20	@ Cubs	4 – 2	**Haren** (8-11)	Rusin (2-3)	**Soriano** (32)	30,975	61-64
126	August 21	@ Cubs	11 – 6	**Roark** (3-0)	Russell (1-4)		31,936	62-64
127	August 22	@ Cubs	5 – 4 (13)	**Stammen** (7-5)	Bowden (1-3)	**Storen** (3)	29,393	63-64
128	August 23	@ Royals	11 – 10	**Roark** (4-0)	Chen (5-2)	**Soriano** (33)	28,733	64-64
129	August 24	@ Royals	7 – 2	**Zimmermann** (15-7)	Davis (6-10)		28,023	65-64
130	August 25	@ Royals	6 – 4	Herrera (5-6)	**Stammen** (7-6)	Holland (35)	19,661	65-65
131	August 27	Marlins	2 – 1	**Ohlendorf** (3-0)	Eovaldi (2-5)	**Soriano** (34)	24,616	66-65
132	August 28	Marlins	4 – 3	**Storen** (4-2)	Dunn (3-4)	**Soriano** (35)	24,394	67-65
133	August 29	Marlins	9 – 0	**González** (8-6)	Koehler (3-9)		27,374	68-65
134	August 30	Mets	3 – 2	Gee (10-9)	**Zimmermann** (15-8)	Hawkins (6)	35,008	68-66
135	August 31	Mets	11 – 3	Wheeler (7-3)	**Haren** (8-12)		34,481	68-67

September (18–9)

#	Date	Opponent	Score	Win	Loss	Save	Attendance	Record
136	September 1	Mets	6 – 5	**Davis** (1-0)	Germen (1-2)	**Soriano** (36)	28,995	69-67
137	September 2	@ Phillies	3 – 2	Rosenberg (2-0)	**Clippard** (6-3)	Papelbon (24)	30,248	69-68
138	September 3	@ Phillies	9 – 6	**González** (9-6)	Martin (2-4)	**Soriano** (37)	28,826	70-68
139	September 4	@ Phillies	3 – 2	**Zimmermann** (16-8)	Diekman (1-4)	**Soriano** (38)	31,495	71-68
140	September 6	@ Marlins	7 – 0	Fernández (11-6)	**Haren** (8-13)		25,118	71-69
141	September 7	@ Marlins	9 – 2	**Roark** (5-0)	Eovaldi (3-6)		28,336	72-69
142	September 8	@ Marlins	6 – 4	**Strasburg** (7-9)	Turner (3-6)	**Soriano** (39)	18,990	73-69
143	September 9	@ Mets	9 – 0	**González** (10-6)	Torres (3-4)		20,174	74-69
144	September 10	@ Mets	6 – 3	**Zimmermann** (17-8)	Gee (11-10)	**Soriano** (40)	20,307	75-69
145	September 11	@ Mets	3 – 0	**Haren** (9-13)	Wheeler (7-5)	**Soriano** (41)	20,151	76-69
146	September 12	@ Mets	7 – 2	**Roark** (6-0)	Harang (5-12)		20,484	77-69
147	September 13	Phillies	6 – 1	**Ohlendorf** (4-0)	Kendrick (10-13)		31,325	78-69
148	September 14	Phillies	5 – 4	Hamels (8-13)	**González** (10-7)	Papelbon (27)	33,972	78-70
149	September 15	Phillies	11 – 2	**Zimmermann** (18-8)	Cloyd (2-5)		33,746	79-70
–	September 16	Braves	Postponed (Washington Navy Yard shooting) Rescheduled for September 17 as part of a doubleheader					
150	September 17 (1)	Braves	6 – 5	**Krol** (2-1)	Kimbrel (3-3)		25,066	80-70
151	September 17 (2)	Braves	4 – 0	**Roark** (7-0)	García (4-7)		28,369	81-70
152	September 18	Braves	5 – 2	Loe (2-3)	**Ohlendorf** (4-1)	Kimbrel (48)	30,636	81-71
153	September 19	Marlins	3 – 2	**González** (11-7)	Álvarez (4-5)	**Soriano** (42)	25,945	82-71
154	September 20	Marlins	8 – 0	**Zimmermann** (19-8)	Turner (3-8)		34,752	83-71
–	September 21	Marlins	Postponed (rain) Rescheduled for September 22 as part of a doubleheader					
155	September 22 (1)	Marlins	4 – 2	Koehler (4-10)	**Haren** (9-14)	Cishek (32)	35,101	83-72
156	September 22 (2)	Marlins	5 – 4	**Soriano** (3-3)	Dyson (0-2)		34,824	84-72
157	September 23	@ Cardinals	4 – 3	Wainwright (18-9)	**Roark** (7-1)	Rosenthal (1)	39,783	84-73
158	September 24	@ Cardinals	2 – 0	Wacha (4-1)	**González** (11-8)	Rosenthal (2)	38,940	84-74
159	September 25	@ Cardinals	4 – 1	Miller (15-9)	**Zimmermann** (19-9)	Rosenthal (3)	40,597	84-75
160	September 27	@ Diamondbacks	8 – 4	**Strasburg** (8-9)	Corbin (14-8)		31,037	85-75
161	September 28	@ Diamondbacks	2 – 0	**Haren** (10-14)	McCarthy (5-11)	**Soriano** (43)	29,673	86-75
162	September 29	@ Diamondbacks	3 – 2	Hernández (5-6)	**Mattheus** (0-2)	Ziegler (13)	30,420	86-76

== Roster ==
2013 Washington Nationals
Roster
Pitchers: 58 Fernando Abad; 64 Xavier Cedeño; 36 Tyler Clippard; 51 Erik Davis; 48 Ross Detwiler; 30 Zach Duke; 47 Gio González; 15 Dan Haren; 38 Taylor Jordan; 57 Nate Karns; 46 Ian Krol; 52 Ryan Mattheus; 31 Yunesky Maya; 43 Ross Ohlendorf; 59 Tanner Roark; 63 Henry Rodríguez; 29 Rafael Soriano; 35 Craig Stammen; 22 Drew Storen; 37 Stephen Strasburg; 27 Jordan Zimmermann	Catchers: 41 Sandy León; 40 Wilson Ramos; 23 Jhonatan Solano; 24 Kurt Suzuki; Infielders: 20 Ian Desmond; 8 Danny Espinosa; 25 Adam LaRoche; 1 Steve Lombardozzi Jr.; 14 Chris Marrero; 6 Anthony Rendon; 18 Chad Tracy; 4 Zach Walters; 11 Ryan Zimmerman	Outfielders: 33 Roger Bernadina; 10 Corey Brown; 4 David DeJesus; 7 Scott Hairston; 34 Bryce Harper; 26 Jeff Kobernus; 12 Tyler Moore; 3 Eury Pérez; 2 Denard Span; 28 Jayson Werth	Manager: 5 Davey Johnson; Coaches: 4 Rick Eckstein (hitting) (Fired on July 22, 2013); 44 Trent Jewett (third base); 53 Randy Knorr (bench); 9 Jim Lett (bullpen); 54 Steve McCatty (pitching); 39 Rick Schu (hitting) (Hired on July 22, 2013); 32 Tony Tarasco (first base)

== Statistics ==
Both tables are sortable.

=== Batting ===
Note: POS = Position; G = Games played; AB = At bats; R = Runs scored; H = Hits; 2B = Doubles; 3B = Triples; HR = Home runs; RBI = Runs batted in; AVG = Batting average; SB = Stolen bases

Complete offensive statistics can be found here.

POS	Player	G	AB	R	H	2B	3B	HR	RBI	AVG	SB
P	Fernando Abad	39	0	0	0	0	0	0	0	–	0
OF	Roger Bernadina	85	152	18	27	6	1	2	6	.178	3
OF	Corey Brown	14	12	2	2	1	0	1	1	.167	1
P	Xavier Cedeño	11	0	0	0	0	0	0	0	–	0
P	Tyler Clippard	72	0	0	0	0	0	0	0	–	0
P	Erik Davis	10	0	0	0	0	0	0	0	–	0
OF	David DeJesus	3	3	0	0	0	0	0	0	.000	0
SS	Ian Desmond	158	600	77	168	38	3	20	80	.280	21
P	Ross Detwiler	13	22	1	2	0	0	0	0	.091	0
P	Zach Duke	12	1	0	1	0	0	0	0	1.000	0
2B	Danny Espinosa	44	158	11	25	9	0	3	12	.158	1
P	Gio Gonzalez	32	56	2	5	1	0	1	1	.089	0
OF	Scott Hairston	33	58	5	13	3	0	2	7	.224	0
P	Dan Haren	31	47	2	8	3	0	0	2	.170	0
LF	Bryce Harper	118	424	71	116	24	3	20	58	.274	11
P	Taylor Jordan	9	14	0	2	0	0	0	0	.143	0
P	Nathan Karns	3	3	0	0	0	0	0	0	.000	0
OF	Jeff Kobernus	24	30	8	5	0	0	1	1	.167	3
P	Ian Krol	32	0	0	0	0	0	0	0	–	0
1B	Adam LaRoche	152	511	70	121	19	3	20	62	.237	4
C	Sandy León	2	1	0	0	0	0	0	0	.000	0
UT	Steve Lombardozzi Jr.	118	290	25	75	15	1	2	22	.259	4
UT	Chris Marrero	8	16	0	2	0	0	0	1	.125	0
P	Ryan Mattheus	37	0	0	0	0	0	0	0	–	0
P	Yunesky Maya	1	0	0	0	0	0	0	0	–	0
LF	Tyler Moore	63	167	16	37	9	0	4	21	.222	0
P	Ross Ohlendorf	16	15	0	0	0	0	0	1	.000	0
OF	Eury Pérez	9	8	1	1	0	0	0	0	.125	1
C	Wilson Ramos	78	287	29	78	9	0	16	59	.272	0
2B	Anthony Rendon	98	351	42	93	23	1	7	35	.265	1
P	Tanner Roark	14	14	0	4	1	0	0	1	.286	0
P	Henry Rodriguez	17	0	0	0	0	0	0	0	–	0
C	Jhonatan Solano	24	48	2	7	2	0	0	2	.146	0
P	Rafael Soriano	68	0	0	0	0	0	0	0	–	0
CF	Denard Span	153	610	75	170	28	11	4	47	.279	20
P	Craig Stammen	55	5	0	0	0	0	0	0	.000	0
P	Drew Storen	68	0	0	0	0	0	0	0	–	0
P	Stephen Strasburg	30	49	2	7	2	0	0	2	.143	0
C	Kurt Suzuki	79	252	19	56	11	1	3	25	.222	2
UT	Chad Tracy	92	129	6	26	4	0	4	11	.202	0
IF	Zach Walters	8	8	2	3	0	1	0	1	.375	0
RF	Jayson Werth	129	462	84	147	24	0	25	82	.318	10
3B	Ryan Zimmerman	147	568	84	156	26	2	26	79	.275	6
P	Jordan Zimmermann	32	65	4	8	1	0	0	2	.123	0
	Team totals	162	5436	656	1365	259	27	161	621	.251	88

=== Pitching ===
Note: POS = Position; G = Games pitched; GS = Games started; IP = Innings pitched; H = Hits allowed; W = Wins; L = Losses; SV = Saves; HLD = Holds; ERA = Earned run average; SO= Strikeouts; WHIP = Walks and hits per inning pitched

Complete pitching statistics can be found here.

POS	Player	G	GS	IP	H	W	L	SV	HLD	ERA	SO	WHIP
RP	Fernando Abad	39	0	37.2	42	0	3	0	2	3.35	32	1.38
	Xavier Cedeño	11	0	6.0	5	0	0	0	2	1.50	6	1.00
RP	Tyler Clippard	72	0	71.0	37	6	3	0	33	2.41	73	0.86
	Erik Davis	10	0	8.2	10	1	0	0	0	3.12	12	1.27
SP	Ross Detwiler	13	13	71.1	92	2	7	0	0	4.04	39	1.49
	Zach Duke	12	1	20.2	31	1	1	0	0	8.71	11	1.89
SP	Gio Gonzalez	32	32	195.2	169	11	8	0	0	3.36	192	1.25
SP	Dan Haren	31	30	169.2	179	10	14	1	0	4.67	151	1.24
	Taylor Jordan	9	9	51.2	59	1	3	0	0	3.66	29	1.35
	Nathan Karns	3	3	12.0	17	0	1	0	0	7.50	11	1.92
	Ian Krol	32	0	27.1	28	2	1	0	2	3.95	22	1.32
RP	Ryan Mattheus	37	0	35.1	52	0	2	0	6	6.37	22	1.90
	Yunesky Maya	1	0	0.1	2	0	1	0	0	54.00	0	6.00
	Ross Ohlendorf	16	7	60.1	56	4	1	0	1	3.28	45	1.16
	Tanner Roark	14	5	53.2	38	7	1	0	1	1.51	40	0.91
RP	Henry Rodriguez	17	0	18.0	14	0	1	0	1	4.00	11	1.67
CL	Rafael Soriano	68	0	66.2	65	3	3	43	0	3.11	51	1.23
RP	Craig Stammen	55	0	81.2	78	7	6	0	7	2.76	79	1.29
RP	Drew Storen	68	0	61.2	65	4	2	3	24	4.52	58	1.36
SP	Stephen Strasburg	30	30	183.0	136	8	9	0	0	3.00	191	1.05
SP	Jordan Zimmermann	32	32	213.1	192	19	9	0	0	3.25	161	1.09
	Team totals	162	162	1445.2	1367	86	76	47	79	3.59	1236	1.23

=== Team leaders ===
Qualifying players only.

==== Batting ====
Stat	Player	Total
Avg.	Jayson Werth	.318
HR	Ryan Zimmerman	26
RBI	Jayson Werth	82
R	Jayson Werth; Ryan Zimmerman	84; 84
H	Denard Span	170
SB	Ian Desmond	21

==== Pitching ====
Stat	Player	Total
W	Jordan Zimmermann	19
L	Dan Haren	14
ERA	Stephen Strasburg	3.00
SO	Gio González	192
SV	Rafael Soriano	43
IP	Jordan Zimmermann	213.1

== Awards and honors ==
=== All-Stars ===
- Bryce Harper, OF
- Jordan Zimmermann, P

Jordan Zimmermann did not appear in the 2013 Major League Baseball All-Star Game due to injury.

=== Annual awards ===
- Silver Slugger: Ian Desmond, SS

Ian Desmond became the second Washington Nationals player to win two Silver Slugger Awards. The first was third baseman Ryan Zimmermann, who won Silver Slugger Awards in 2009 and 2010.

== Farm system ==
Level	Team	League	Manager
AAA	Syracuse Chiefs	International League	Tony Beasley
AA	Harrisburg Senators	Eastern League	Matthew LeCroy
A	Potomac Nationals	Carolina League	Brian Daubach
A	Hagerstown Suns	South Atlantic League	Tripp Keister
A-Short Season	Auburn Doubledays	New York–Penn League	Gary Cathcart
Rookie	GCL Nationals	Gulf Coast League	Patrick Anderson

LEAGUE CHAMPIONS: GCL Nationals
