= 2013 Atlanta Braves season =

2013 Atlanta Braves
- National League East champions
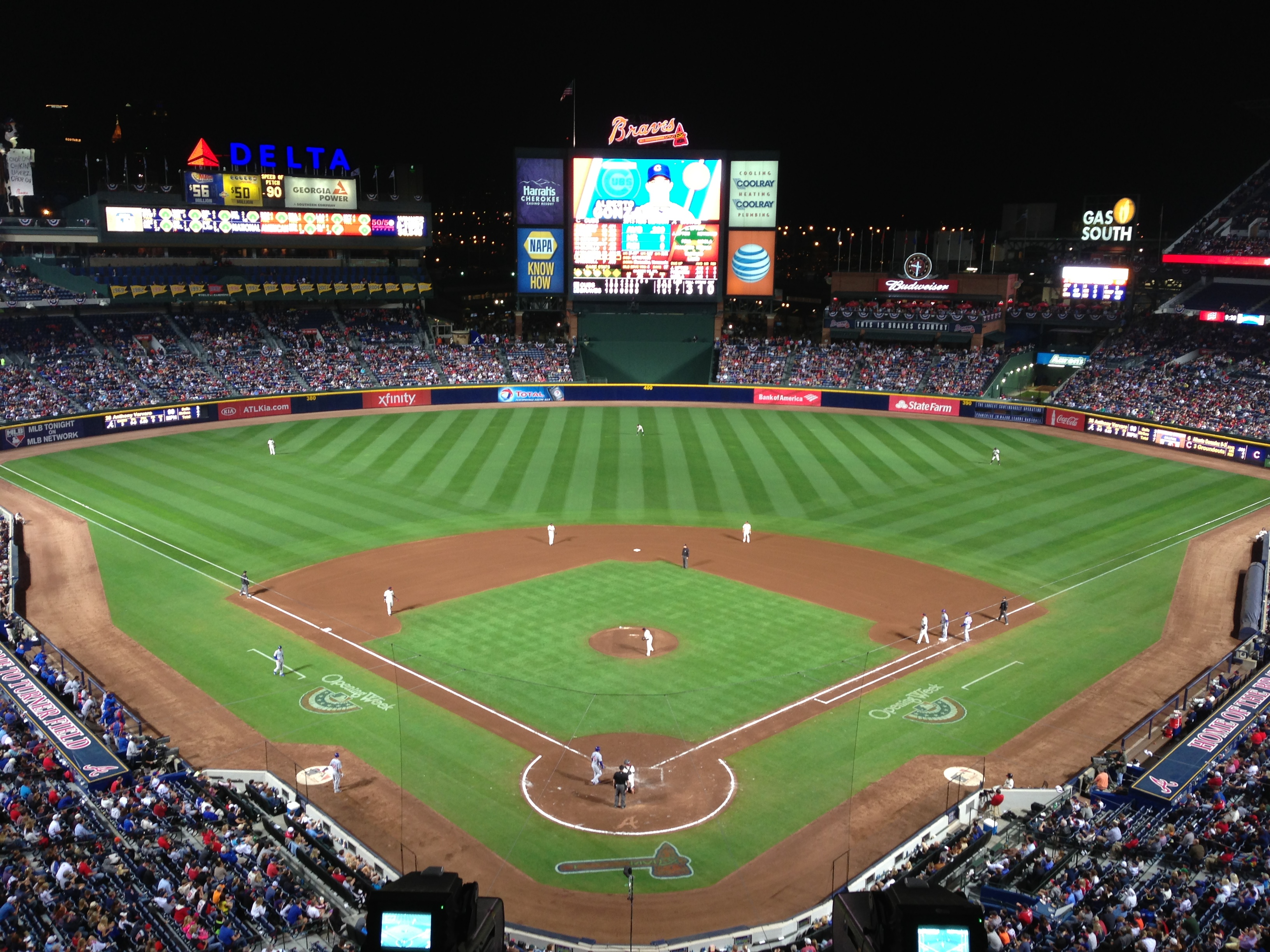
- The Braves during a home game in April 2013
- League: National League
- Division: East
- Ballpark: Turner Field
- City: Atlanta, Georgia
- Record: 96–66 (.593)
- Divisional place: 1st
- Owners: Liberty Media/John Malone
- General managers: Frank Wren
- Managers: Fredi González
- Television: SportSouth; Fox Sports South (Chip Caray, Joe Simpson, Tom Glavine, Dale Murphy, Elizabeth Moreau)
- Radio: WCNN; WNNX; Atlanta Braves Radio Network (Jim Powell, Don Sutton, Mark Lemke, Pete Manzano, Fernando Palacios)

The 2013 Atlanta Braves season was the Braves' 17th season of home games at Turner Field, 48th season in Atlanta, and 143rd season overall. The Atlanta Braves were the 2013 National League Eastern division champions with a record of 96–66. The Braves won their first game of the season (7–5) against the Philadelphia Phillies on April 1. They finished the season in first place in the National League East, but lost to the Los Angeles Dodgers in the NLDS. This was also the Braves first division title since the "Baby Braves" in 2005.

== Offseason ==
The Braves began the offseason with some major holes to fill. The Braves were losing future Hall of Famer Chipper Jones to retirement, and centerfielder and lead-off man Michael Bourn was lost to free agency. The idea going into the offseason was to get a center fielder and either a third baseman or left fielder, with Martín Prado playing either third base or left field depending which way they decided to go.

The Braves signed B. J. Upton to a 5-year $75.25 million contract very early in the offseason, filling the need in centerfield. In January, they then acquired B.J.'s brother Justin Upton, a left fielder from the Diamondbacks, along with third baseman Chris Johnson, in exchange for Prado, Randall Delgado, and three minor league prospects.

The Braves also traded Tommy Hanson to the Angels for relief pitcher Jordan Walden, signed back-up infielder Ramiro Pena, and signed Gerald Laird to replace back-up catcher David Ross, who signed with the Red Sox as a free agent. They also brought back a former teammate by claiming outfielder Jordan Schafer off waivers from the Houston Astros.

=== Offseason subtractions and additions ===
| Subtractions | Additions |
|---|---|
| RHS Tommy Hanson (traded to Angels); RHS Jair Jurrjens (signed with Orioles); RHR Peter Moylan (signed with Dodgers); RHS Randall Delgado (traded to D'Backs); RHR Chad Durbin (signed with Phillies); C David Ross (signed with Red Sox); C J. C. Boscán (signed with Cubs); 1B/OF Eric Hinske (signed with D'Backs); 1B Lyle Overbay (Signed with Yankees); 3B Chipper Jones (Retired); INF Jeff Baker (signed with Rangers); INF/OF Martín Prado (traded to D'Backs); OF Michael Bourn (signed with Indians); OF Matt Diaz (signed with Marlins) | RHR Jordan Walden (acquired in trade with Angels); C Gerald Laird (signed as free agent); 3B Chris Johnson (acquired in trade with D'Backs); INF Ramiro Pena (signed as free agent); INF Blake DeWitt (signed as free agent); OF B. J. Upton (signed as free agent); OF Justin Upton (acquired in trade from D'Backs); OF Jordan Schafer (claimed off waivers) |

- On November 16, 2012, the Atlanta Braves signed free agent C Gerald Laird to a two-year deal worth $3M.
- On November 29, the Braves signed free agent CF B.J. Upton to a five-year deal worth $75.25M.
- On November 30, the Braves traded RHP Tommy Hanson to the Los Angeles Angels for RHP Jordan Walden.
- On December 6, the Braves signed free agent LF Reed Johnson to a one-year deal worth $1.6M with the possibility to earn $150k in incentives, as well as a 2014 club option worth $1.6M or a $150K buyout.
- On December 7, the Braves signed free agent SS Ramiro Peña to a one-year deal.
- On January 24, 2013, the Atlanta Braves traded 3B Martín Prado, RHP Randall Delgado, RHP Zeke Spruill, SS Nick Ahmed and 3B Brandon Drury to the Arizona Diamondbacks for LF Justin Upton and 3B Chris Johnson.

== Notable moments ==
- On April 6, down 5–4 in the ninth Melvin Upton Jr. (then known as B.J. Upton) hit a solo home run off of Carlos Mármol to tie the game at 5–5. His brother Justin came up 3rd in the inning and he hit the walk-off home run to dead center and the Braves won 6–5.
- On April 23 against the Colorado Rockies, the Upton brothers hit back-to-back home runs, the first to do so since 1938.
- On May 21 down 4–3 in the bottom of the 9th inning, Evan Gattis hit a two-out, solo homerun to tie the game. In the 10th inning, Freddie Freeman hit a bloop single scoring Jason Heyward from second base to win the game.
- On June 1 against the Nationals, with the game tied at 1–1 in the 9th inning, the Nationals had runners at 3rd and 2nd with no outs and Craig Kimbrel pitching. Kimbrel came through, though. Ian Desmond struck out looking, Roger Bernadina hit a chopper to third, Chris Johnson fielded and threw Ryan Zimmerman out at home. Finally, Danny Espinosa flew out to Justin Upton to end the inning. In the bottom of the 10th, Melvin Upton Jr. singled and Jordan Schafer scored just ahead of Bernadina's throw for the win.
- On June 4 against the Pirates, Andrelton Simmons hit a walk off triple in the 10th inning off of Mark Melancon for the 5-4 win.
- On June 17 Dillon Gee took a shutout into the 9th inning. Looking for his first career complete game shutout, Freddie Freeman ruined the shutout bid with a walk off two-run home run with one out to win the game 2–1.
- On July 29 the Braves beat the Rockies 9–8 in an epic game. The Rockies beat up Brandon Beachy who was making his first start since July 2012 due to Tommy John surgery. Down 5–0 in the bottom of the 3rd, the Braves struck for 6 runs to take a 6–5 lead. The Rockies scored two more in the fourth to retake the lead. In the Bottom of the 5th the Braves retook the lead at 8–7 on a Dan Uggla RBI double and a Joey Terdoslavich RBI single. In the top of the 9th the Rockies rallied to tie the game when Carlos González hit an RBI single off of Jordan Walden to score Dexter Fowler. With the bases loaded newly acquired reliever Scott Downs threw one pitch to Todd Helton. He hit a line-drive right back to Downs who speared it to end the inning. In the bottom of the 10th, Andrelton Simmons hit a triple scoring Dan Uggla for a 10–9 Braves win.
- On August 16 Justin Upton hit a walk off homerun in the bottom of the 10th off of current Brave Ian Krol to win the game 3–2. It was his 23rd home run.
- On August 28 against the Indians with the game tied at 2–2 in the bottom of the 9th inning Schafer stood at 2nd and Freeman at 1st with Chris Johnson at the plate. He hit the walk off single on a 2–2 count to score Schafer and win the game 3–2.
- On August 31 Melvin Upton Jr. went 4 for 6 with the walk off single in the bottom of the 11th to win the game 5–4. He struck out in his first two at-bats before getting hits in the next four.
- On September 14 Craig Kimbrel broke his personal single-season saves record of 46 with his 47th in a 2–1 win over the Padres.
- On September 22 the Braves clinched the NL East with the Nationals loss to the Marlins. The Braves beat the Cubs that day 5–2. It was their first NL East title since 2005.
- On September 24 Andrelton Simmons hit the walk off single with two outs in the bottom of 9th over Carlos Gómez to score Justin Upton and win the game 3–2.
- The Braves lead the league with 24 wins in their last at-bat. They led the National League with 44 come-from-behind wins.
- With the Braves opening day win they shared a tie with the Nationals for first place. The Braves shared at least a tie of first place every day from April 7 on and with their win over the Nationals on April 13 had sole possession of first place in the NL East for the rest of the season. On top of that, the Braves overall record was never at or under .500 at any point in the season.
- The Braves lead the majors in team ERA at 3.18. Their bullpen lead the majors in bullpen ERA at 2.46 while their starters were at 3.51.
- The Atlanta Braves won their 10th straight game with a 6–3 victory over the Kansas City Royals on April 16, their longest winning streak since the club won 15 straight between April 15 – May 2, 2000. With a 12–1 record up to that point, the Braves were off to their best start since they began the 1982 season 13–1. They also outhomered opponents 25–7 and outscored opponents 68–25 for the best run differential in the majors. After the Braves and Royals had a day off on April 15, players, managers and coaches for both teams wore No. 42 on their jerseys to honor Jackie Robinson on April 16. Like many teams, the Braves also held a moment of silence before the game for victims of the Boston Marathon bombing.
- With Wade Davis pitching 7 scoreless innings, the Royals beat the Braves 1–0 on April 17 to end Atlanta's 10-game winning streak. Atlanta's 10-game winning streak, was one of only five such stretches within the first 13 games of a season since 1900. (2013 Braves 10 / 1982 Braves 13 / 1962 Pirates 10 / 1955 Dodgers 10 / 1938 Giants 11)
- On April 26, against the Detroit Tigers, Tiger pitcher Aníbal Sánchez struck out 17 Atlanta Braves' batters, setting a franchise record previously set by Tigers' left-hander Mickey Lolich in 1972.
- On April 30, Braves pitcher Tim Hudson became the 113th major league pitcher to reach 200 wins. Hudson also went two for three in the game, hitting a home run and a double as the Braves beat the Washington Nationals 8–1.
- On June 5, Julio Teherán pitched into the eighth inning with two outs without giving up a hit to the Pittsburgh Pirates. Teherán gave up the first (and only) hit of the game to Pirates pinch hitter Brandon Inge.
- On July 24, Tim Hudson was pitching a 4-hit shutout against the New York Mets when Eric Young, Jr. accidentally stepped on Hudson's ankle, resulting in a right ankle fracture that ended Hudson's 2013 season.
- From July 26 – August 9 the Braves won 14 straight games (including four consecutive series sweeps) and were one game away from tying the franchise record of 15 set in 2000; the winning streak was snapped after a 1-0 loss to the Miami Marlins on August 10.

Opening Day Starting Lineup
| Name | Position |
|---|---|
| Andrelton Simmons | Shortstop |
| Jason Heyward | Right fielder |
| Justin Upton | Left fielder |
| Freddie Freeman | First baseman |
| B. J. Upton | Center fielder |
| Dan Uggla | Second baseman |
| Chris Johnson | Third baseman |
| Gerald Laird | Catcher |
| Tim Hudson | Starting pitcher |

=== Awards ===
All-Stars

- Craig Kimbrel
- Freddie Freeman (winner of All-Star Final Vote)
- Brian McCann (replaced Freeman on the roster due to injury.)

NL Player of the Month

- Justin Upton (April)

NL Rookie of the Month

- Evan Gattis (April)
- Evan Gattis (May)

NL Player of the Week

- Tim Hudson (April 29 – May 5)
- Brian McCann (with Homer Bailey; July 1–7)
- Andrelton Simmons- 2013 Gold Glove [Shortstop]

== Season standings ==
=== National League East ===
NL East
| Team | W | L | Pct. | GB | Home | Road |
|---|---|---|---|---|---|---|
| Atlanta Braves | 96 | 66 | .593 | — | 56‍–‍25 | 40‍–‍41 |
| Washington Nationals | 86 | 76 | .531 | 10 | 47‍–‍34 | 39‍–‍42 |
| New York Mets | 74 | 88 | .457 | 22 | 33‍–‍48 | 41‍–‍40 |
| Philadelphia Phillies | 73 | 89 | .451 | 23 | 43‍–‍38 | 30‍–‍51 |
| Miami Marlins | 62 | 100 | .383 | 34 | 36‍–‍45 | 26‍–‍55 |

=== National League division champions ===
Division winners
| Team | W | L | Pct. |
|---|---|---|---|
| St. Louis Cardinals | 97 | 65 | .599 |
| Atlanta Braves | 96 | 66 | .593 |
| Los Angeles Dodgers | 92 | 70 | .568 |

Wild Card teams (Top 2 teams qualify for postseason)
| Team | W | L | Pct. | GB |
|---|---|---|---|---|
| Pittsburgh Pirates | 94 | 68 | .580 | +4 |
| Cincinnati Reds | 90 | 72 | .556 | — |
| Washington Nationals | 86 | 76 | .531 | 4 |
| Arizona Diamondbacks | 81 | 81 | .500 | 9 |
| San Francisco Giants | 76 | 86 | .469 | 14 |
| San Diego Padres | 76 | 86 | .469 | 14 |
| Colorado Rockies | 74 | 88 | .457 | 16 |
| New York Mets | 74 | 88 | .457 | 16 |
| Milwaukee Brewers | 74 | 88 | .457 | 16 |
| Philadelphia Phillies | 73 | 89 | .451 | 17 |
| Chicago Cubs | 66 | 96 | .407 | 24 |
| Miami Marlins | 62 | 100 | .383 | 28 |

=== Record vs. opponents ===
2013 National League record Source: MLB Standings Grid – 2013
| Team | AZ | ATL | CHC | CIN | COL | LAD | MIA | MIL | NYM | PHI | PIT | SD | SF | STL | WSH | AL |
|---|---|---|---|---|---|---|---|---|---|---|---|---|---|---|---|---|
| Arizona | — | 2–4 | 4–3 | 3–4 | 12–7 | 10–9 | 4–2 | 6–1 | 3–4 | 3–4 | 3–3 | 7–12 | 7–12 | 4–3 | 2–4 | 11–9 |
| Atlanta | 4–2 | — | 5–1 | 4–3 | 6–1 | 5–2 | 13–6 | 2–4 | 10–9 | 11–8 | 4–3 | 1–5 | 3–4 | 4–3 | 13–6 | 11–9 |
| Chicago | 3–4 | 1–5 | — | 5–14 | 3–3 | 1–6 | 4–3 | 6–13 | 3–3 | 3–3 | 7–12 | 3–4 | 4–3 | 7–12 | 3–4 | 13–7 |
| Cincinnati | 4–3 | 3–4 | 14–5 | — | 2–4 | 4–3 | 6–1 | 10–9 | 4–2 | 4–2 | 8–11 | 3–3 | 6–1 | 8–11 | 3–4 | 11–9 |
| Colorado | 7–12 | 1–6 | 3–3 | 4–2 | — | 10–9 | 3–4 | 4–2 | 3–4 | 3–4 | 4–2 | 12–7 | 9–10 | 3–4 | 3–4 | 5–15 |
| Los Angeles | 9–10 | 2–5 | 6–1 | 3–4 | 9–10 | — | 5–2 | 4–2 | 5–1 | 5–2 | 4–2 | 11–8 | 8–11 | 4–3 | 5–1 | 12–8 |
| Miami | 2–4 | 6–13 | 3–4 | 1–6 | 4–3 | 2–5 | — | 1–5 | 11–8 | 7–12 | 2–4 | 3–4 | 4–3 | 2–4 | 5–14 | 9–11 |
| Milwaukee | 1–6 | 4–2 | 13–6 | 9–10 | 2–4 | 2–4 | 5–1 | — | 4–3 | 5–2 | 7–12 | 3–4 | 5–2 | 5–14 | 3–4 | 6–14 |
| New York | 4–3 | 9–10 | 3–3 | 2–4 | 4–3 | 1–5 | 8–11 | 3–4 | — | 10–9 | 2–5 | 4–3 | 4–2 | 2–5 | 7–12 | 11–9 |
| Philadelphia | 4–3 | 8–11 | 3–3 | 2–4 | 4–3 | 2–5 | 12–7 | 2–5 | 9–10 | — | 3–4 | 4–2 | 3–3 | 2–5 | 8–11 | 7–13 |
| Pittsburgh | 3–3 | 3–4 | 12–7 | 11–8 | 2–4 | 2–4 | 4–2 | 12–7 | 5–2 | 4–3 | — | 3–4 | 4–3 | 10–9 | 4–3 | 15–5 |
| San Diego | 12–7 | 5–1 | 4–3 | 3–3 | 7–12 | 8–11 | 4–3 | 4–3 | 3–4 | 2–4 | 4–3 | — | 8–11 | 2–4 | 2–5 | 8–12 |
| San Francisco | 12–7 | 4–3 | 3–4 | 1–6 | 10–9 | 11–8 | 3–4 | 2–5 | 2–4 | 3–3 | 3–4 | 11–8 | — | 2–4 | 3–3 | 6–14 |
| St. Louis | 3–4 | 3–4 | 12–7 | 11–8 | 4–3 | 3–4 | 4–2 | 14–5 | 5–2 | 5–2 | 9–10 | 4–2 | 4–2 | — | 6–0 | 10–10 |
| Washington | 4–2 | 6–13 | 4–3 | 4–3 | 4–3 | 1–5 | 14–5 | 4–3 | 12–7 | 11–8 | 3–4 | 5–2 | 3–3 | 0–6 | — | 11–9 |

=== Game log ===
Legend
| Braves Win | Braves Loss | Game postponed |

2013 Regular Season Game Log (96–66)
April (17–9)

| # | Date | Opponent | Score | Win | Loss | Save | Attendance | Time | Record | Streak |
|---|---|---|---|---|---|---|---|---|---|---|
| 1 | April 1 | Phillies | 7–5 | Avilán (1–0) | Hamels (0–1) | Kimbrel (1) | 51,456 | 2:56 | 1–0 | W1 |
| 2 | April 3 | Phillies | 9–2 | Maholm (1–0) | Halladay (0–1) | | 24,289 | 3:18 | 2–0 | W2 |
| 3 | April 4 | Phillies | 0–2 | Lee (1–0) | Medlen (0–1) | Papelbon (1) | 18,295 | 2:33 | 2–1 | L1 |
| 4 | April 5 | Cubs | 4–1 | Minor (1–0) | Feldman (0–1) | Kimbrel (2) | 33,433 | 2:36 | 3–1 | W1 |
| 5 | April 6 | Cubs | 6–5 | O'Flaherty (1–0) | Mármol (0–1) | | 38,498 | 3:12 | 4–1 | W2 |
| 6 | April 7 | Cubs | 5–1 | Hudson (1–0) | Samardzija (1–1) | | 45,800 | 2:50 | 5–1 | W3 |
| 7 | April 8 | @ Marlins | 2–0 | Maholm (2–0) | Slowey (0–2) | Kimbrel (3) | 34,439 | 2:33 | 6–1 | W4 |
| 8 | April 9 | @ Marlins | 3–2 | Medlen (1–1) | LeBlanc (0–2) | Kimbrel (4) | 14,222 | 2:33 | 7–1 | W5 |
| 9 | April 10 | @ Marlins | 8–0 | Minor (2–0) | Sanabia (1–1) | | 13,810 | 2:48 | 8–1 | W6 |
| 10 | April 12 | @ Nationals | 6–4 (10) | O'Flaherty (2–0) | Stammen (2–1) | Kimbrel (5) | 33,130 | 3:29 | 9–1 | W7 |
| 11 | April 13 | @ Nationals | 3–1 | Hudson (2–0) | Strasburg (1–2) | Kimbrel (6) | 41,992 | 2:42 | 10–1 | W8 |
| 12 | April 14 | @ Nationals | 9–0 | Maholm (3–0) | González (1–1) | | 39,389 | 2:44 | 11–1 | W9 |
| 13 | April 16 | Royals | 6–3 | O'Flaherty (3–0) | Herrera (1–1) | | 26,400 | 2:36 | 12–1 | W10 |
| 14 | April 17 | Royals | 0–1 | Davis (2–0) | Minor (2–1) | Holland (3) | 23,018 | 2:30 | 12–2 | L1 |
| 15 | April 18 | @ Pirates | 6–4 | Varvaro (1–0) | Hughes (1–1) | Kimbrel (7) | 11,288 | 3:15 | 13–2 | W1 |
| 16 | April 19 | @ Pirates | 0–6 | Rodríguez (2–0) | Hudson (2–1) | | 18,705 | 2:40 | 13–3 | L1 |
| 17 | April 20 | @ Pirates | 1–3 | McDonald (2–2) | Maholm (3–1) | Grilli (6) | 29,313 | 2:30 | 13–4 | L2 |
| 18 | April 21 | @ Pirates | 2–4 | Wilson (1–0) | Medlen (1–2) | Grilli (7) | 20,873 | 3:30 | 13–5 | L3 |
| 19 | April 23 | @ Rockies | 4–3 | Minor (3–1) | Francis (1–2) | Kimbrel (8) | 19,124 | 2:37 | 14–5 | W1 |
| 20 | April 23 | @ Rockies | 10–2 | Teherán (1–0) | Garland (2–0) | | 21,724 | 2:51 | 15–5 | W2 |
| 21 | April 24 | @ Rockies | 5–6 (12) | Belisle (1–1) | Ayala (1–1) | | 35,234 | 3:48 | 15–6 | L1 |
| 22 | April 26 | @ Tigers | 0–10 | Sánchez (3–1) | Maholm (3–2) | | 35,161 | 2:41 | 15–7 | L2 |
| 23 | April 27 | @ Tigers | 4–7 | Porcello (1–2) | Medlen (1–3) | Valverde (2) | 42,881 | 2:55 | 15–8 | L3 |
| 24 | April 28 | @ Tigers | 3–8 | Fister (40) | Minor (3–2) | | 33,469 | 2:40 | 15–9 | L4 |
| 25 | April 29 | Nationals | 3–2 | Walden (1–0) | Clippard (1–1) | Kimbrel (9) | 22,870 | 2:52 | 16–9 | W1 |
| 26 | April 30 | Nationals | 8–1 | Hudson (3–1) | González (2–2) | | 19,243 | 2:32 | 17–9 | W2 |

May (15–13)

| # | Date | Opponent | Score | Win | Loss | Save | Attendance | Time | Record | Streak |
|---|---|---|---|---|---|---|---|---|---|---|
| 27 | May 1 | Nationals | 0–2 | Zimmermann (5–1) | Maholm (3–3) | Soriano (8) | 22,460 | 2:15 | 17–10 | L1 |
| 28 | May 2 | Nationals | 1–3 | Haren (3–3) | Medlen (1–4) | Soriano (9) | 19,806 | 2:26 | 17–11 | L2 |
| 29 | May 3 | Mets | 5–7 (10) | Parnell (2–0) | Walden (1–1) | Familia (1) | 30,871 | 3:29 | 17–12 | L3 |
| – | May 4 | Mets | Postponed (rain). Makeup Date June 18. | | | | | | | |
| 30 | May 5 | Mets | 9–4 | Hudson (4–1) | Niese (2–3) | | 32,849 | 3:05 | 18–12 | W1 |
| 31 | May 6 | @ Reds | 7–4 | Maholm (4–2) | Arroyo (2–4) | Kimbrel (10) | 19,308 | 3:21 | 19–12 | W2 |
| 32 | May 7 | @ Reds | 4–5 | Broxton (1–1) | Kimbrel (0–1) | | 25,730 | 2:50 | 19–13 | L1 |
| 33 | May 8 | @ Reds | 7–2 | Minor (4–2) | Leake (2–2) | | 32,640 | 3:04 | 20–13 | W1 |
| 34 | May 9 | @ Giants | 6–3 | Teherán (2–0) | Vogelsong (1–3) | Kimbrel (11) | 41,635 | 3:06 | 21–13 | W2 |
| 35 | May 10 | @ Giants | 2–8 | Cain (2–2) | Hudson (4–2) | | 41,387 | 2:39 | 21–14 | L1 |
| 36 | May 11 | @ Giants | 1–10 | Bumgarner (4–1) | Maholm (4–4) | | 41,530 | 3:03 | 21–15 | L2 |
| 37 | May 12 | @ Giants | 1–5 | Lincecum (3–2) | Medlen (1–4) | | 42,231 | 2:57 | 21–16 | L3 |
| 38 | May 13 | @ Diamondbacks | 10–1 | Minor (5–2) | Miley (3–2) | | 25,052 | 3:02 | 22–16 | W1 |
| 39 | May 14 | @ Diamondbacks | 0–2 | Corbin (6–0) | Teherán (2–1) | Bell (5) | 30,150 | 2:48 | 22–17 | L1 |
| 40 | May 15 | @ Diamondbacks | 3–5 | Kennedy (2–3) | Hudson (4–3) | Bell (6) | 23,524 | 3:00 | 22–18 | L2 |
| 41 | May 17 | Dodgers | 8–5 | Maholm (4–4) | Rodriguez (0–2) | Kimbrel (12) | 43,238 | 2:53 | 23–18 | W1 |
| 42 | May 18 | Dodgers | 3–1 | Gearrin (1–0) | Jansen (1–2) | Kimbrel (13) | 38,615 | 2:40 | 24–18 | W2 |
| 43 | May 19 | Dodgers | 5–2 | Avilán (2–0) | Jansen (1–3) | Kimbrel (14) | 43,118 | 3:21 | 25–18 | W3 |
| 44 | May 20 | Twins | 5–1 | Teherán (3–1) | Correia (4–4) | Gearrin (1) | 20,173 | 2:43 | 26–18 | W4 |
| 45 | May 21 | Twins | 5–4 (10) | Kimbrel (1–1) | Duensing (0–1) | | 28,663 | 3:25 | 27–18 | W5 |
| 46 | May 22 | Twins | 8–3 | Maholm (6–4) | Worley (1–5) | | 27,798 | 2:58 | 28–18 | W6 |
| 47 | May 24 | @ Mets | 7–5 (10) | Varvaro (2–0) | Lyon (1–2) | Kimbrel (15) | 32,325 | 3:52 | 29–18 | W7 |
| 48 | May 25 | @ Mets | 6–0 | Minor (6–2) | Gee (2–6) | | 27,622 | 3:07 | 30–18 | W8 |
| 49 | May 26 | @ Mets | 2–4 | Hawkins (1–0) | Gearrin (1–1) | Parnell (7) | 27,296 | 2:47 | 30–19 | L1 |
| 50 | May 27 | @ Blue Jays | 3–9 | Buehrle (2–3) | Hudson (4–4) | | 22,808 | 2:41 | 30–20 | L2 |
| 51 | May 28 | @ Blue Jays | 7–6 (10) | Gearrin (2–1) | Weber (0–1) | Kimbrel (16) | 45,224 | 3:18 | 31–20 | W1 |
| 52 | May 29 | Blue Jays | 0–3 | Pérez (1–0) | Medlen (1–6) | Janssen (11) | 22,489 | 2:55 | 31–21 | L1 |
| 53 | May 30 | Blue Jays | 11–3 | Minor (7–2) | Dickey (4–7) | | 29,967 | 2:31 | 32–21 | W1 |
| 54 | May 31 | Nationals | 2–3 | Stammen (3–1) | Teherán (3–2) | Soriano (15) | 36,350 | 2:59 | 32–22 | L1 |

June (16–12)

| # | Date | Opponent | Score | Win | Loss | Save | Attendance | Time | Record | Streak |
|---|---|---|---|---|---|---|---|---|---|---|
| 55 | June 1 | Nationals | 2–1 (10) | Walden (2–1) | Rodríguez (0–1) | | 46,910 | 3:07 | 33–22 | W1 |
| 56 | June 2 | Nationals | 6–3 | Maholm (7–4) | Karns (0–1) | Kimbrel (17) | 30,134 | 2:58 | 34–22 | W2 |
| 57 | June 3 | Pirates | 7–2 | Medlen (2–6) | Burnett (3–6) | | 19,526 | 3:05 | 35–22 | W3 |
| 58 | June 4 | Pirates | 5–4 (10) | Varvaro (3–0) | Melancon (1–1) | | 28,681 | 3:44 | 36–22 | W4 |
| 59 | June 5 | Pirates | 5–0 | Teherán (4–2) | Rodríguez (6–4) | | 28,703 | 2:54 | 37–22 | W5 |
| 60 | June 6 | @ Dodgers | 0–5 | Greinke (3–1) | Hudson (4–5) | | 44,196 | 2:36 | 37–23 | L1 |
| 61 | June 7 | @ Dodgers | 1–2 (10) | League (2–2) | Varvaro (3–1) | | 47,164 | 3:01 | 37–24 | L2 |
| 62 | June 8 | @ Dodgers | 2–1 | Medlen (3–6) | Fife (1–1) | Kimbrel (18) | 52,716 | 3:06 | 38–24 | W1 |
| 63 | June 9 | @ Dodgers | 8–1 | Minor (8–2) | Magill (0–2) | | 39,028 | 3:08 | 39–24 | W2 |
| 64 | June 10 | @ Padres | 6–7 | Marquis (8–2) | Teherán (4–3) | Thayer (1) | 21,192 | 2:31 | 39–25 | L1 |
| 65 | June 11 | @ Padres | 2–3 | Cashner (5–3) | Hudson (4–6) | Gregerson (3) | 22,330 | 2:33 | 39–26 | L2 |
| 66 | June 12 | @ Padres | 3–5 | Vólquez (5–5) | Maholm (7–5) | Vincent (1) | 22,316 | 2:54 | 39–27 | L3 |
| 67 | June 14 | Giants | 0–6 | Bumgarner (6–4) | Medlen (3–7) | | 45,833 | 2:44 | 39–28 | L4 |
| 68 | June 15 | Giants | 6–5 | Kimbrel (2–1) | Romo (3–3) | | 47,178 | 3:10 | 40–28 | W1 |
| 69 | June 16 | Giants | 3–0 | Teherán (5–3) | Lincecum (4–7) | Kimbrel (19) | 33,681 | 2:54 | 41–28 | W2 |
| 70 | June 17 | Mets | 2–1 | Carpenter (1–0) | Gee (5–7) | | 22,048 | 2:29 | 42–28 | W3 |
| 71 | June 18 | Mets | 3–4 | Harvey (6–1) | Wood (0–1) | Parnell (10) | 21,857 | 3:13 | 42–29 | L1 |
| 72 | June 18 | Mets | 1–6 | Wheeler (1–0) | Maholm (7–6) | | 21,073 | 3:24 | 42–30 | L2 |
| 73 | June 19 | Mets | 5–3 | Medlen (4–7) | Marcum (0–9) | Kimbrel (20) | 21,852 | 3:00 | 43–30 | W1 |
| 74 | June 20 | Mets | 3–4 | Hawkins (2–0) | Minor (8–3) | Parnell (11) | 33,824 | 3:10 | 43–31 | L1 |
| 75 | June 21 | @ Brewers | 0–2 | Peralta (5–8) | Teherán (5–4) | Henderson (10) | 32,594 | 2:49 | 43–32 | L2 |
| 76 | June 22 | @ Brewers | 0–2 | Badenhop (1–3) | Hudson (4–7) | Rodríguez (6) | 41,974 | 2:47 | 43–33 | L3 |
| 77 | June 23 | @ Brewers | 7–4 | Maholm (8–6) | Fígaro (1–2) | Kimbrel (21) | 41,221 | 3:22 | 44–33 | W1 |
| 78 | June 25 | @ Royals | 4–3 | Medlen (5–7) | Collins (2–2) | Kimbrel (22) | 29,947 | 2:59 | 45–33 | W2 |
| 79 | June 26 | @ Royals | 3–4 (10) | Crow (4–3) | Wood (0–2) | | 22,207 | 3:08 | 45–34 | L1 |
| 80 | June 28 | Diamondbacks | 3–0 | Teherán (5–4) | Delgado (0–2) | Kimbrel (23) | 48,282 | 3:00 | 46–34 | W1 |
| 81 | June 29 | Diamondbacks | 11–5 | Walden (3–1) | Hernandez (4–5) | | 39,180 | 3:46 | 47–34 | W2 |
| 82 | June 30 | Diamondbacks | 6–2 | Maholm (9–6) | Cahill (3–10) | | 34,574 | 3:01 | 48–34 | W3 |

July (15–11)

| # | Date | Opponent | Score | Win | Loss | Save | Attendance | Time | Record | Streak |
|---|---|---|---|---|---|---|---|---|---|---|
| 83 | July 2 | Marlins | 11–3 | Medlen (6–7) | Jennings (0–1) | | 28,045 | 3:05 | 49–34 | W4 |
| 84 | July 3 | Marlins | 3–6 | Nolasco (5–8) | Minor (8–4) | Cishek (16) | 26,129 | 2:46 | 49–35 | L1 |
| 85 | July 4 | Marlins | 3–4 | Ramos (3–2) | Kimbrel (2–2) | Cishek (17) | 35,465 | 3:28 | 49–36 | L2 |
| 86 | July 5 | @ Phillies | 4–5 | Lee (10–2) | Maholm (9–6) | Papelbon (18) | 42,044 | 2:47 | 49–37 | L3 |
| 87 | July 6 | @ Phillies | 13–4 | Hudson (5–7) | Kendrick (7–6) | | 37,044 | 3:22 | 50–37 | W1 |
| 88 | July 7 | @ Phillies | 3–7 | Pettibone (5–3) | Medlen (6–8) | | 38,148 | 3:13 | 50–38 | L1 |
| 89 | July 8 | @ Marlins | 7–1 (14) | Carpenter (2–0) | Hatcher (0–1) | | 15,705 | 4:14 | 51–38 | W1 |
| 90 | July 9 | @ Marlins | 6–4 | Teherán (7–4) | Álvarez (0–1) | Kimbrel (24) | 17,399 | 3:12 | 52–38 | W2 |
| 91 | July 10 | @ Marlins | 2–6 | Turner (3–1) | Maholm (9–8) | | 23,921 | 2:58 | 52–39 | L1 |
| 92 | July 11 | Reds | 6–5 | Hudson (6–7) | Latos (8–3) | Kimbrel (25) | 40,186 | 3:07 | 53–39 | W1 |
| 93 | July 12 | Reds | 2–4 | Arroyo (8–7) | Medlen (6–9) | Chapman (21) | 43,275 | 3:03 | 53–40 | L1 |
| 94 | July 13 | Reds | 5–2 | Minor (9–4) | Bailey (5–8) | Kimbrel (26) | 46,946 | 2:40 | 54–40 | W1 |
| 95 | July 14 | Reds | 4–8 | Ondrusek (3–0) | Teherán (7–5) | | 29,846 | 3:22 | 54–41 | L1 |
| – | July 16 | All-Star Game | AL 3–0 NL | Sale | Corbin | Nathan | 45,186 | 3:06 | Citi Field | |
| 96 | July 19 | @ White Sox | 6–4 | Hudson (7–7) | Danks (2–7) | Kimbrel (27) | 25,613 | 2:51 | 55–41 | W1 |
| 97 | July 20 | @ White Sox | 6–10 | Peavy (7–4) | Maholm (9–9) | | 27,294 | 3:10 | 55–42 | L1 |
| 98 | July 21 | @ White Sox | 1–3 | Quintana (5–2) | Minor (9–5) | Reed (25) | 27,729 | 2:37 | 55–43 | L2 |
| 99 | July 22 | @ Mets | 2–1 | Walden (4–1) | Parnell (5–5) | Kimbrel (28) | 25,111 | 3:03 | 56–43 | W1 |
| 100 | July 23 | @ Mets | 1–4 | Torres (1–1) | Medlen (6–10) | Parnell (19) | 24,355 | 2:54 | 56–44 | L1 |
| 101 | July 24 | @ Mets | 8–2 | Hudson (8–7) | Hefner (4–8) | | 28,194 | 3:03 | 57–44 | W1 |
| 102 | July 25 | @ Mets | 4–7 | Wheeler (4–1) | Loe (1–2) | Parnell (20) | 35,793 | 3:27 | 57–45 | L1 |
| 103 | July 26 | Cardinals | 4–1 | Minor (10–5) | Wainwright (13–6) | Kimbrel (29) | 50,124 | 2:33 | 58–45 | W1 |
| 104 | July 27 | Cardinals | 2–0 | Avilán (3–0) | Choate (1–1) | Kimbrel (30) | 48,312 | 2:31 | 59–45 | W2 |
| 105 | July 28 | Cardinals | 5–2 | Medlen (7–10) | Miller (10–7) | Kimbrel (31) | 34,478 | 2:58 | 60–45 | W3 |
| 106 | July 29 | Rockies | 9–8 (10) | Downs (3–3) | Escalona (1–4) | | 31,218 | 3:46 | 61–45 | W4 |
| 107 | July 30 | Rockies | 11–3 | Wood (1–2) | Nicasio (6–5) | | 28,107 | 2:49 | 62–45 | W5 |
| 108 | July 31 | Rockies | 9–0 | Minor (11–5) | Chatwood (7–4) | | 22,097 | 3:00 | 63–45 | W6 |

August (20–7)

| # | Date | Opponent | Score | Win | Loss | Save | Attendance | Time | Record | Streak |
|---|---|---|---|---|---|---|---|---|---|---|
| 109 | August 1 | Rockies | 11–2 | Teherán (8–5) | Bettis (0–1) | | 30,069 | 3:15 | 64–45 | W7 |
| 110 | August 2 | @ Phillies | 6–4 | Medlen (8–10) | Martin (0–1) | Kimbrel (32) | 35,087 | 3:10 | 65–45 | W8 |
| 111 | August 3 | @ Phillies | 5–4 (12) | Avilán (4–0) | Diekman (0–2) | Kimbrel (33) | 41,161 | 4:10 | 66–45 | W9 |
| 112 | August 4 | @ Phillies | 4–1 | Wood (2–2) | Lee (10–5) | Kimbrel (34) | 37,235 | 3:12 | 67–45 | W10 |
| 113 | August 5 | @ Nationals | 3–2 | Carpenter (3–0) | Clippard (6–2) | Walden (1) | 33,002 | 2:55 | 68–45 | W11 |
| 114 | August 6 | @ Nationals | 2–1 | Teherán (9–5) | González (7–5) | Kimbrel (35) | 30,875 | 2:53 | 69–45 | W12 |
| 115 | August 7 | @ Nationals | 6–3 | Medlen (9–10) | Mattheus (0–1) | Kimbrel (36) | 29,114 | 3:21 | 70–45 | W13 |
| 116 | August 9 | Marlins | 5–0 | Beachy (1–0) | Turner (3–4) | | 37,424 | 2:26 | 71–45 | W14 |
| 117 | August 10 | Marlins | 0–1 | Dunn (3–3) | Walden (4–2) | Cishek (24) | 42,177 | 2:30 | 71–46 | L1 |
| 118 | August 11 | Marlins | 9–4 | Minor (12–5) | Jennings (1–3) | | 32,881 | 3:06 | 72–46 | W1 |
| 119 | August 12 | Phillies | 1–5 | Hamels (5–13) | Teherán (9–6) | | 20,676 | 2:45 | 72–47 | L1 |
| 120 | August 13 | Phillies | 3–1 | Medlen (10–10) | Martin (1–2) | Kimbrel (37) | 21,697 | 2:28 | 73–47 | W1 |
| 121 | August 14 | Phillies | 6–3 | Beachy (2–0) | Lannan (3–6) | Kimbrel (38) | 18,638 | 2:50 | 74–47 | W2 |
| 122 | August 16 | Nationals | 3–2 (10) | Downs (4–3) | Krol (1–1) | | 35,663 | 3:11 | 75–47 | W3 |
| 123 | August 17 | Nationals | 7–8 (15) | Stammen (6–5) | Medlen (10–11) | Haren (1) | 40,866 | 5:29 | 75–48 | L1 |
| 124 | August 18 | Nationals | 2–1 | Teherán (10–6) | González (7–6) | Kimbrel (39) | 27,221 | 2:53 | 76–48 | W1 |
| 125 | August 20 | @ Mets | 3–5 | Wheeler (6–2) | Beachy (2–1) | Hawkins (5) | 25,863 | 3:05 | 76–49 | L1 |
| 126 | August 21 | @ Mets | 4–1 (10) | Avilán (5–0) | Atchison (3–2) | Kimbrel (40) | 22,935 | 3:05 | 77–49 | W1 |
| 127 | August 22 | @ Cardinals | 2–6 | Kelly (5–3) | Maholm (9–10) | | 37,363 | 2:56 | 77–50 | L1 |
| 128 | August 23 | @ Cardinals | 1–3 | Wainwright (15–7) | Medlen (10–12) | | 41,134 | 2:31 | 77–51 | L2 |
| 129 | August 24 | @ Cardinals | 2–6 | Miller (12–8) | Teherán (10–7) | Mujica (34) | 43,633 | 2:59 | 77–52 | L3 |
| 130 | August 25 | @ Cardinals | 5–2 | Minor (13–5) | Lynn (13–8) | Kimbrel (41) | 44,009 | 2:41 | 78–52 | W1 |
| 131 | August 27 | Indians | 2–0 | Wood (3–2) | Salazar (1–2) | Kimbrel (42) | 21,400 | 2:41 | 79–52 | W2 |
| 132 | August 28 | Indians | 3–2 | Kimbrel (3–2) | Smith (5–2) | | 20,804 | 3:03 | 80–52 | W3 |
| 133 | August 29 | Indians | 3–1 | Medlen (11–12) | Jiménez (9–9) | Kimbrel (43) | 22,081 | 2:42 | 81–52 | W4 |
| 134 | August 30 | Marlins | 2–1 | Teherán (11–7) | Fernández (10–6) | Varvaro (1) | 28,255 | 2:52 | 82–52 | W5 |
| 135 | August 31 | Marlins | 5–4 (11) | Ayala (2–1) | Webb (1–5) | | 32,727 | 3:59 | 83–52 | W6 |

September (13–14)

| # | Date | Opponent | Score | Win | Loss | Save | Attendance | Time | Record | Streak |
|---|---|---|---|---|---|---|---|---|---|---|
| 136 | September 1 | Marlins | 0–7 | Eovaldi (3–5) | Wood (3–3) | | 38,441 | 2:44 | 83–53 | L1 |
| 137 | September 2 | Mets | 13–5 | Maholm (10–10) | Matsuzaka (0–3) | | 26,530 | 3:41 | 84–53 | W1 |
| 138 | September 3 | Mets | 3–1 | Medlen (12–12) | Torres (3–3) | Kimbrel (44) | 21,221 | 2:42 | 85–53 | W2 |
| 139 | September 4 | Mets | 2–5 | Gee (11–9) | Loe (1–3) | Hawkins (7) | 22,946 | 3:01 | 85–54 | L1 |
| 140 | September 6 | @ Phillies | 1–2 | Lee (12–6) | Minor (13–6) | Papelbon (25) | 37,088 | 2:14 | 85–55 | L2 |
| 141 | September 7 | @ Phillies | 5–6 | Papelbon (5–1) | García (3–6) | | 36,330 | 3:18 | 85–56 | L3 |
| 142 | September 8 | @ Phillies | 2–3 | Hamels (7–13) | Carpenter (3–1) | Rosenberg (1) | 38,706 | 2:28 | 85–57 | L4 |
| 143 | September 9 | @ Marlins | 5–2 | Medlen (13–12) | Álvarez (3–4) | Kimbrel (45) | 18,503 | 2:46 | 86–57 | W1 |
| 144 | September 10 | @ Marlins | 4–3 | Teherán (12–7) | Koehler (3–10) | Kimbrel (46) | 19,095 | 3:13 | 87–57 | W2 |
| 145 | September 11 | @ Marlins | 2–5 | Fernández (12–6) | Minor (13–7) | | 25,111 | 2:42 | 87–58 | L1 |
| 146 | September 12 | @ Marlins | 6–1 | García (4–6) | Flynn (0–1) | | 15,274 | 2:36 | 88–58 | W1 |
| 147 | September 13 | Padres | 3–4 | Vincent (5–3) | Walden (4–3) | Street (30) | 34,112 | 3:00 | 88–59 | L1 |
| 148 | September 14 | Padres | 2–1 | Medlen (14–12) | Erlin (2–3) | Kimbrel (47) | 40,153 | 2:48 | 89–59 | W1 |
| 149 | September 15 | Padres | 0-4 | Smith (1–1) | Teherán (12–8) | | 36,125 | 2:57 | 89-60 | L1 |
| – | September 16 | @ Nationals | Postponed (Washington Navy Yard shooting). Rescheduled for September 17. | | | | | | | |
| 150 | September 17 | @ Nationals | 5-6 | Krol (2–1) | Kimbrel (3–3) | | 25,066 | 3:03 | 89-61 | L2 |
| 151 | September 17 | @ Nationals | 0-4 | Roark (7–0) | García (4–7) | | 28,369 | 2:25 | 89-62 | L3 |
| 152 | September 18 | @ Nationals | 5-2 | Loe (2–3) | Ohlendorf (4–1) | Kimbrel (48) | 30,636 | 3:20 | 90-62 | W1 |
| 153 | September 20 | @ Cubs | 9-5 | Carpenter (4–1) | Gregg (2–5) | | 29,539 | 3:15 | 91-62 | W2 |
| 154 | September 21 | @ Cubs | 1–3 | Villanueva (7–8) | Downs (4–4) | Strop (1) | 34,612 | 2:42 | 91–63 | L1 |
| 155 | September 22 | @ Cubs | 5–2 | Teherán (13–8) | Jackson (8–17) | Kimbrel (49) | 30,515 | 3:18 | 92–63 | W1 |
| 156 | September 23 | Brewers | 0-5 | Estrada (7–4) | Minor (13–8) | | 19,893 | 2:29 | 92-64 | L1 |
| 157 | September 24 | Brewers | 3-2 | Kimbrel (4–3) | Hand (0–5) | | 22,605 | 2:32 | 93-64 | W1 |
| 158 | September 25 | Brewers | 0–4 | Lohse (11–10) | Maholm (10–11) | | 19,558 | 2:31 | 93–65 | L1 |
| 159 | September 26 | Phillies | 7–1 | Hale (1–0) | Cloyd (2–7) | | 27,858 | 3:04 | 94–65 | W1 |
| 160 | September 27 | Phillies | 1–0 | Medlen (15–12) | Lee (14–8) | Kimbrel (50) | 38,711 | 2:07 | 95–65 | W2 |
| 161 | September 28 | Phillies | 4–5 | García (1–1) | Minor (13–9) | | 38,171 | 3:31 | 95–66 | L1 |
| 162 | September 29 | Phillies | 12–5 | Teherán (14–8) | Miner (0–2) | | 42,194 | 3:27 | 96–66 | W1 |

== Roster ==
2013 Atlanta Braves
Roster
| Pitchers: 43 Luis Avilán; 48,20 Luis Ayala; 37 Brandon Beachy; 48 David Carpenter; 32 Scott Downs; 50 Freddy García; 53 Cory Gearrin; 62 David Hale; 15 Tim Hudson; 46 Craig Kimbrel; 40 Kameron Loe; 28 Paul Maholm; 50 Cristhian Martínez; 54 Kris Medlen; 36 Mike Minor; 34 Eric O'Flaherty; 57 Cory Rasmus; 49 Julio Teherán; 38 Anthony Varvaro; 52 Jordan Walden; 58 Alex Wood | Catchers: 11 Gerald Laird; 16 Brian McCann; Infielders: 32 Blake DeWitt; 25 Juan Francisco; 5 Freddie Freeman; 59 Phil Gosselin; 4 Paul Janish; 23 Chris Johnson; 30 Elliot Johnson; 1 Tyler Pastornicky; 14 Ramiro Peña; 19 Andrelton Simmons; 26 Dan Uggla | Outfielders: 13 José Constanza; 30,59,57 Todd Cunningham; 24 Evan Gattis; 22 Jason Heyward; 7 Reed Johnson; 17 Jordan Schafer; 25 Joey Terdoslavich; 2 B. J. Upton; 8 Justin Upton; Other batters: 61 Christian Bethancourt | Manager: 33 Fredi González; Coaches: 55 Alan Butts (bullpen catcher); 56 Scott Fletcher (assistant hitting); 45 Roger McDowell (pitching); 9 Terry Pendleton (first base); 12 Eddie Pérez (bullpen); 51 Brian Snitker (third base); 18 Carlos Tosca (bench); 27 Greg Walker (hitting) |

=== Opening day lineup ===
- C – Gerald Laird
- P – Tim Hudson
- 1B – Freddie Freeman
- 2B – Dan Uggla
- 3B – Chris Johnson
- SS – Andrelton Simmons
- LF – Justin Upton
- CF – B. J. Upton
- RF – Jason Heyward

== Post-season ==
=== Division Series ===
==== Game 1, October 3 ====
8:07 p.m. (EDT) at Turner Field in Atlanta

| Team | 1 | 2 | 3 | 4 | 5 | 6 | 7 | 8 | 9 | R | H | E |
|---|---|---|---|---|---|---|---|---|---|---|---|---|
| Los Angeles | 0 | 2 | 2 | 1 | 0 | 1 | 0 | 0 | 0 | 6 | 11 | 0 |
| Atlanta | 0 | 0 | 0 | 1 | 0 | 0 | 0 | 0 | 0 | 1 | 5 | 0 |
WP: Clayton Kershaw (1–0) LP: Kris Medlen (0–1); Home runs: LAD: Adrián González (1); ATL: None

Braves ace Kris Medlen struck out the side in the first inning, getting Carl Crawford looking and Mark Ellis and Hanley Ramírez swinging, throwing Turner Field into a frenzy. That would be the highlight of the night for the Braves as Medlen fell apart after the first and Clayton Kershaw dominated the strikeout-prone Braves racking up 12 while allowing only one run and hurling a complete-game. The Braves went down in order in the first. Kershaw struck out Jason Heyward and their leading offensive power Freddie Freeman to end the first. In the second inning the Dodgers got going. After an Adrián González line out controversial, rookie phenom Yasiel Puig singled followed by a single from Juan Uribe putting runners at 3rd and 1st. Skip Schumaker then hit a sac-fly to Jason Heyward scoring Puig and Uribe tagging to 2nd base with two outs. Next, Catcher A.J. Ellis smashed a double, scoring Uribe. Kershaw grounded out to first to end the top half of the second inning. Evan Gattis (the Braves feel-good story of 2013) led-off the bottom half of the 2nd with a single. Unfortunately, after a Brian McCann fly-out, surprise slugger Chris Johnson, who finished second in the National League Batting Race, flew out to Puig. This time Gattis came too far off first base and he was thrown out for an inning-ending double play. The situation only got worse in the third inning for the Braves. Crawford hit an infield single and advanced to second. It looked like the Braves might escape unscathed after getting Ellis and Ramírez to pop out. However, on the first pitch of his at-bat, Adrián González hammered a two-run homerun, extending the Dodgers lead to 4-0 and basically ending the game. Kershaw kept the Braves quiet in the third inning, while Mark Ellis drove in A.J. Ellis who hit his second double, making the score 5-0. Finally, the Braves broke through against Kershaw in the bottom of the fourth inning. After Justin Upton grounded out to Kershaw for the second time, Freeman singled and Gattis walked. McCann filed out, but Chris Johnson, who finished third in the league in batting average with runners in scoring position and two outs, singled scoring Freeman for their only run of the game. Andrelton Simmons struck out next to end the inning. After a González lead-off single and Puig hit-by-pitch, Braves manager Fredi González pulled Medlen for break out, lefty Luis Avilán. After a sacrifice bunt by Uribe and intentional walk of Schumaker, Avilán struck out A.J. Ellis and Clayton Kershaw to end the threat. However, Kershaw struck out the side in the bottom half of the fifth inning. Getting Elliot Johnson and B.J. Upton (pinch-hitting for Avilán) looking and Jason Heyward swinging. Jordan Walden relieved Avilán in the sixth inning. Crawford grounded out to lead-off the inning, but Mark Ellis singled and Hanley Ramírez doubled to score Ellis, to close the scoring at 6-1. Kershaw shut down Atlanta over the next three innings. With the win the Dodgers took a 1-0 series lead.

==== Game 2, October 4 ====
6:07 p.m. (EDT) at Turner Field in Atlanta

| Team | 1 | 2 | 3 | 4 | 5 | 6 | 7 | 8 | 9 | R | H | E |
|---|---|---|---|---|---|---|---|---|---|---|---|---|
| Los Angeles | 1 | 0 | 0 | 0 | 0 | 0 | 0 | 2 | 0 | 3 | 10 | 0 |
| Atlanta | 0 | 1 | 0 | 1 | 0 | 0 | 2 | 0 | 0 | 4 | 6 | 0 |
WP: Mike Minor (1–0) LP: Zack Greinke (0–1) Sv: Craig Kimbrel (1); Home runs: LAD: Hanley Ramírez (1); ATL: None

==== Game 3, October 6 ====
8:07 p.m. (EDT) at Dodger Stadium in Los Angeles

| Team | 1 | 2 | 3 | 4 | 5 | 6 | 7 | 8 | 9 | R | H | E |
|---|---|---|---|---|---|---|---|---|---|---|---|---|
| Atlanta | 2 | 0 | 2 | 0 | 0 | 0 | 0 | 0 | 2 | 6 | 10 | 2 |
| Los Angeles | 0 | 4 | 2 | 4 | 0 | 0 | 0 | 3 | X | 13 | 14 | 0 |
WP: Chris Capuano (1–0) LP: Julio Teherán (0–1); Home runs: ATL: Jason Heyward (1); LAD: Carl Crawford (1), Juan Uribe (1)

==== Game 4, October 7 ====
9:37 p.m. (EDT) at Dodger Stadium in Los Angeles

| Team | 1 | 2 | 3 | 4 | 5 | 6 | 7 | 8 | 9 | R | H | E |
|---|---|---|---|---|---|---|---|---|---|---|---|---|
| Atlanta | 0 | 0 | 0 | 2 | 0 | 0 | 1 | 0 | 0 | 3 | 7 | 0 |
| Los Angeles | 1 | 0 | 1 | 0 | 0 | 0 | 0 | 2 | X | 4 | 11 | 2 |
WP: Brian Wilson (1–0) LP: David Carpenter (0–1) Sv: Kenley Jansen (1); Home runs: ATL: None; LAD: Carl Crawford 2 (3), Juan Uribe (2)

== Player statistics ==
Statistics updated after game on September 29, 2013.
† denotes player is on 15-day disabled list.
‡ denotes player is on 60-day disabled list.
* denotes player is active, but on the inactive roster.
x denotes player was traded mid-season and is no longer in the organization.

=== Batting ===
Note: G = Games played; AB = At bats; R = Runs scored; H = Hits; 2B = Doubles; 3B = Triples; HR = Home runs; RBI = Runs batted in; TB = Total bases; BB = Walks; K = Strikeouts; SB = Stolen bases; AVG = Batting average; OBP = On base percentage; SLG = Slugging percentage

| Player | G | AB | R | H | 2B | 3B | HR | RBI | TB | BB | K | SB | AVG | OBP | SLG |
|---|---|---|---|---|---|---|---|---|---|---|---|---|---|---|---|
| Andrelton Simmons | 157 | 606 | 76 | 150 | 27 | 6 | 17 | 59 | 240 | 40 | 55 | 6 | .248 | .296 | .396 |
| Justin Upton | 149 | 558 | 94 | 147 | 27 | 2 | 27 | 70 | 259 | 75 | 161 | 8 | .263 | .354 | .464 |
| Freddie Freeman | 147 | 551 | 89 | 176 | 27 | 2 | 23 | 109 | 276 | 66 | 121 | 1 | .319 | .396 | .501 |
| Chris Johnson | 142 | 514 | 54 | 165 | 34 | 0 | 12 | 68 | 235 | 29 | 116 | 0 | .321 | .358 | .457 |
| Dan Uggla | 136 | 448 | 60 | 80 | 10 | 3 | 22 | 55 | 162 | 77 | 171 | 2 | .179 | .309 | .362 |
| B. J. Upton | 126 | 391 | 30 | 72 | 14 | 0 | 9 | 26 | 113 | 44 | 151 | 12 | .184 | .268 | .289 |
| Jason Heyward † | 104 | 382 | 67 | 97 | 22 | 1 | 14 | 38 | 163 | 48 | 73 | 2 | .254 | .349 | .427 |
| Brian McCann | 102 | 356 | 43 | 91 | 13 | 0 | 20 | 57 | 164 | 39 | 66 | 0 | .256 | .336 | .461 |
| Evan Gattis | 105 | 354 | 44 | 86 | 21 | 0 | 21 | 65 | 170 | 21 | 81 | 0 | .243 | .291 | .480 |
| Jordan Schafer | 94 | 231 | 32 | 57 | 8 | 3 | 3 | 21 | 80 | 29 | 73 | 22 | .247 | .331 | .346 |
| Reed Johnson † | 74 | 123 | 13 | 30 | 7 | 1 | 1 | 11 | 42 | 6 | 32 | 0 | .244 | .311 | .341 |
| Luis Avilán | 70 | 1 | 0 | 0 | 0 | 0 | 0 | 0 | 0 | 0 | 0 | 0 | .000 | .000 | .000 |
| Anthony Varvaro | 59 | 1 | 0 | 0 | 0 | 0 | 0 | 0 | 0 | 0 | 1 | 0 | .000 | .000 | .000 |
| Ramiro Peña ‡ | 50 | 97 | 14 | 27 | 5 | 1 | 3 | 12 | 43 | 8 | 18 | 0 | .278 | .330 | .443 |
| David Carpenter | 55 | 3 | 0 | 0 | 0 | 0 | 0 | 0 | 0 | 0 | 1 | 0 | .000 | .000 | .000 |
| Joey Terdoslavich | 55 | 79 | 11 | 17 | 4 | 0 | 0 | 4 | 21 | 12 | 24 | 1 | .215 | .315 | .266 |
| Gerald Laird | 47 | 121 | 12 | 34 | 8 | 0 | 1 | 13 | 45 | 14 | 23 | 1 | .281 | .367 | .372 |
| Paul Janish | 52 | 41 | 7 | 7 | 2 | 0 | 0 | 2 | 9 | 3 | 11 | 0 | .171 | .222 | .220 |
| Juan Francisco x | 35 | 108 | 10 | 26 | 2 | 0 | 5 | 16 | 43 | 7 | 43 | 0 | .241 | .287 | .398 |
| Kris Medlen | 30 | 55 | 3 | 9 | 2 | 0 | 1 | 4 | 14 | 3 | 23 | 1 | .164 | .217 | .255 |
| Mike Minor | 29 | 61 | 3 | 10 | 1 | 0 | 1 | 6 | 14 | 2 | 25 | 0 | .164 | .190 | .230 |
| Julio Teherán | 30 | 58 | 1 | 13 | 3 | 0 | 0 | 2 | 16 | 2 | 16 | 0 | .224 | .250 | .276 |
| Alex Wood | 24 | 21 | 1 | 0 | 0 | 0 | 0 | 0 | 0 | 0 | 15 | 0 | .000 | .000 | .000 |
| Paul Maholm | 23 | 52 | 2 | 7 | 2 | 0 | 0 | 2 | 9 | 1 | 25 | 0 | .135 | .151 | .173 |
| Tim Hudson † | 19 | 38 | 2 | 6 | 1 | 0 | 1 | 3 | 10 | 4 | 14 | 0 | .158 | .238 | .263 |
| Tyler Pastornicky † | 20 | 30 | 5 | 9 | 1 | 0 | 0 | 0 | 10 | 1 | 0 | 0 | .300 | .323 | .333 |
| José Constanza | 21 | 31 | 2 | 8 | 0 | 0 | 0 | 3 | 8 | 0 | 5 | 0 | .258 | .258 | .258 |
| Elliot Johnson | 32 | 92 | 8 | 24 | 5 | 2 | 0 | 10 | 33 | 8 | 18 | 8 | .261 | .317 | .359 |
| Todd Cunningham * | 8 | 8 | 2 | 2 | 0 | 0 | 0 | 0 | 2 | 0 | 3 | 0 | .250 | .250 | .250 |
| Brandon Beachy † | 5 | 8 | 1 | 1 | 0 | 0 | 0 | 0 | 1 | 1 | 3 | 0 | .125 | .222 | .125 |
| Phil Gosselin * | 4 | 6 | 2 | 2 | 0 | 0 | 0 | 0 | 2 | 1 | 2 | 0 | .333 | .429 | .333 |
| Blake DeWitt x | 4 | 3 | 0 | 1 | 1 | 0 | 0 | 0 | 2 | 0 | 0 | 0 | .333 | .333 | .667 |
| Kameron Loe | 9 | 1 | 0 | 0 | 0 | 0 | 0 | 0 | 0 | 0 | 0 | 0 | .000 | .000 | .000 |
| Freddy García | 6 | 8 | 0 | 0 | 0 | 0 | 0 | 0 | 0 | 0 | 5 | 0 | .000 | .000 | .000 |
| Team totals | 162 | 5441 | 688 | 1354 | 247 | 21 | 181 | 656 | 2186 | 542 | 1384 | 64 | .249 | .321 | .402 |

=== Pitching ===
==== Starting pitchers ====
Note: G = Games pitched; GS = Games started; QS = Quality starts; W = Wins; L = Losses; SV = Saves; HLD = Holds; IP = Innings pitched; H = Hits allowed; ER = Earned runs allowed; HR = Home runs allowed; BB = Walks allowed; K = Strikeouts; ERA = Earned run average

| R | Player | G | GS | QS | W | L | SV | HLD | IP | H | ER | HR | BB | K | ERA |
|---|---|---|---|---|---|---|---|---|---|---|---|---|---|---|---|
| 1 | Mike Minor | 32 | 32 | 23 | 13 | 9 | 0 | 0 | 204.2 | 177 | 73 | 22 | 46 | 181 | 3.21 |
| 2 | Kris Medlen | 32 | 31 | 22 | 15 | 12 | 0 | 1 | 197.0 | 194 | 68 | 18 | 47 | 157 | 3.11 |
| 3 | Julio Teherán | 30 | 30 | 18 | 14 | 8 | 0 | 0 | 185.2 | 173 | 66 | 22 | 45 | 170 | 3.20 |
| 4 | Paul Maholm | 26 | 26 | 13 | 10 | 11 | 0 | 0 | 153.2 | 169 | 75 | 17 | 47 | 105 | 4.41 |
| 5 | Tim Hudson ‡ | 21 | 21 | 13 | 8 | 7 | 0 | 0 | 131.1 | 120 | 58 | 10 | 36 | 95 | 3.97 |
| - | Brandon Beachy † | 5 | 5 | 4 | 2 | 1 | 0 | 0 | 30.0 | 27 | 15 | 5 | 4 | 23 | 4.50 |
| - | David Hale | 2 | 2 | 1 | 1 | 0 | 0 | 0 | 11.0 | 11 | 1 | 0 | 1 | 14 | 0.82 |

==== Relief pitchers ====
Note: G = Games pitched; GS = Games started; QS = Quality starts; W = Wins; L = Losses; SV = Saves; HLD = Holds; IP = Innings pitched; H = Hits allowed; ER = Earned runs allowed; HR = Home runs allowed; BB = Walks allowed; K = Strikeouts; ERA = Earned run average

| Player | G | GS | QS | W | L | SV | HLD | IP | H | ER | HR | BB | K | ERA |
|---|---|---|---|---|---|---|---|---|---|---|---|---|---|---|
| Luis Avilán | 75 | 0 | 0 | 5 | 0 | 0 | 27 | 65.0 | 40 | 11 | 1 | 22 | 38 | 1.52 |
| Craig Kimbrel | 68 | 0 | 0 | 4 | 3 | 50 | 0 | 67.0 | 39 | 9 | 4 | 20 | 98 | 1.21 |
| Anthony Varvaro | 62 | 0 | 0 | 3 | 1 | 1 | 6 | 73.1 | 68 | 23 | 3 | 25 | 43 | 2.82 |
| Jordan Walden | 50 | 0 | 0 | 4 | 3 | 1 | 14 | 47.0 | 39 | 18 | 4 | 14 | 54 | 3.45 |
| David Carpenter | 56 | 0 | 0 | 4 | 1 | 0 | 12 | 65.2 | 45 | 13 | 5 | 20 | 74 | 1.78 |
| Cory Gearrin * | 37 | 0 | 0 | 2 | 1 | 1 | 1 | 31.0 | 30 | 13 | 2 | 16 | 23 | 3.77 |
| Alex Wood | 31 | 11 | 5 | 3 | 3 | 0 | 1 | 77.2 | 76 | 27 | 3 | 27 | 77 | 3.13 |
| Luis Ayala | 37 | 0 | 0 | 1 | 1 | 0 | 10 | 23.2 | 23 | 6 | 1 | 11 | 15 | 2.28 |
| Eric O'Flaherty ‡ | 19 | 0 | 0 | 1 | 1 | 0 | 12 | 31.0 | 34 | 10 | 1 | 13 | 20 | 2.90 |
| Scott Downs | 25 | 0 | 0 | 2 | 1 | 0 | 8 | 14.0 | 19 | 6 | 0 | 8 | 15 | 3.86 |
| Kameron Loe | 9 | 1 | 0 | 1 | 2 | 0 | 0 | 11.2 | 17 | 8 | 2 | 5 | 8 | 6.17 |
| Cory Rasmus x | 3 | 0 | 0 | 0 | 0 | 0 | 0 | 6.2 | 8 | 6 | 4 | 3 | 6 | 8.10 |
| Freddy García | 6 | 3 | 3 | 1 | 2 | 0 | 0 | 27.1 | 23 | 5 | 2 | 5 | 20 | 1.65 |
| Cristhian Martínez ‡ | 2 | 0 | 0 | 0 | 0 | 0 | 0 | 2.1 | 5 | 2 | 0 | 0 | 0 | 7.71 |
| Team Pitching Totals | 162 | 162 | 102 | 96 | 66 | 53 | 91 | 1450.1 | 1326 | 512 | 127 | 409 | 1232 | 3.18 |

== Farm system ==
| Level | Team | League | Manager |
|---|---|---|---|
| AAA | Gwinnett Braves | International League | Randy Ready |
| AA | Mississippi Braves | Southern League | Aaron Holbert |
| A | Lynchburg Hillcats | Carolina League | Luis Salazar |
| A | Rome Braves | South Atlantic League | Randy Ingle |
| Rookie | Danville Braves | Appalachian League | Jonathan Schuerholz |
| Rookie | GCL Braves | Gulf Coast League | Rocket Wheeler |
