= Yunesky Maya =

Cuban baseball player (born 1981)

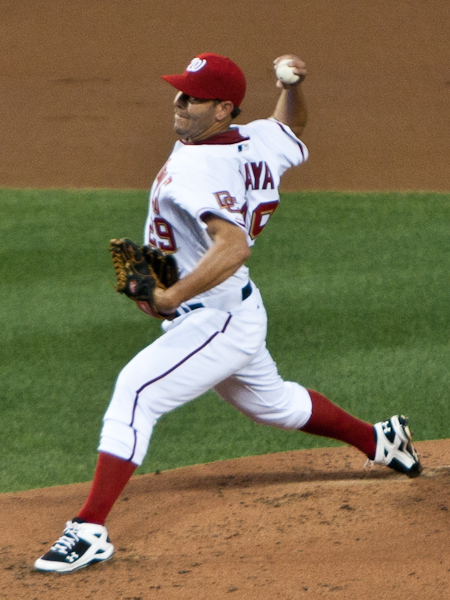
- Maya with the Washington Nationals
- Pitcher
- Born: August 28, 1981 (age 45); Pinar del Río, Cuba
- Batted: Right Threw: Right

Professional debut
- MLB: September 7, 2010, for the Washington Nationals
- KBO: August 1, 2014, for the Doosan Bears

Last appearance
- MLB: May 21, 2013, for the Washington Nationals
- KBO: June 12, 2015, for the Doosan Bears

MLB statistics
- Win–loss record: 1–5
- Earned run average: 5.80
- Strikeouts: 27

KBO statistics
- Win–loss record: 4-9
- Earned run average: 6.58
- Strikeouts: 116
- Stats at Baseball Reference

Teams
- Washington Nationals (2010–2011, 2013); Doosan Bears (2014–2015)

Career highlights and awards
- KBO: Pitched a no-hitter on April 9, 2015
Medals
Men's baseball
Representing Cuba
World Baseball Classic
Silver medal – second place	2006 San Diego	Team
Pan American Games
Gold medal – first place	2007 Rio de Janeiro	Team
Baseball World Cup
Gold medal – first place	2005 Rotterdam	Team
Silver medal – second place	2007 Taipei	Team
Intercontinental Cup
Gold medal – first place	2006 Taichung	Team
Central American and Caribbean Games
Gold medal – first place	2006 Cartagena	Team

Yunesky Maya Mendizula (born August 28, 1981) is a Cuban-born former professional baseball pitcher. He has previously played in Major League Baseball (MLB) for the Washington Nationals, and in the KBO League for the Doosan Bears. He has also played for the Pinar del Río of the Cuban National Series. He was part of the Cuban national baseball team at the 2006 and 2009 World Baseball Classic.

== Playing career ==
=== Cuba ===
Maya led the Cuban National Series with a 1.61 earned run average (ERA) in 2004–05, and followed that up with a 7–9 record and a 3.79 ERA in 2005–06.

In the 2008–2009 Cuban National Series Season Maya finished with a 13–4 record and seven complete games, and finished second amongst League Leaders in ERA with 2.22 ERA. He was also second in strikeouts with 119, behind Aroldis Chapman who had 130 (after the season, Chapman defected and signed with the Cincinnati Reds). With this performance, Maya won Cuba's equivalent of the Cy Young Award. During six Cuban National Series seasons, Maya accumulated a record of 48–29 and an ERA of 2.51.

In Summer 2009, Maya was expelled from the Cuban national baseball team; the official newspaper Granma referred to "grave problems of indiscipline", presumably following a failed attempt to leave the country without permission. In September 2009, Maya successfully fled Cuba. After living in the Dominican Republic for about nine months, the United States Department of Treasury authorized Maya to sign with a Major League Baseball team.

=== Washington Nationals ===
On July 31, 2010, Maya signed with the Washington Nationals. Maya zoomed through the Nationals minor league system, making only five starts, before getting the call to the majors when rosters expanded in September. In the minors, he started two games for the Gulf Coast League Nationals; one game for the Potomac Nationals; and two games for the Syracuse Chiefs, combining for 21 1/3 innings pitched and an overall ERA of 3.38 ERA. He pitched five inning in his first major league start was on September 7, 2010, against the New York Mets (which also saw the big league debut of Met Dillon Gee). After a rough start (allowing a three-run homer in the first inning to Ike Davis), he retired 11 of the last 12 batters he faced. Maya made five starts for Washington during his rookie campaign, posting an 0-3 record and 5.88 ERA with 12 strikeouts over 26 innings of work.

On May 29, 2011, Maya was recalled by the Nationals to take the rotation spot of Tom Gorzelanny, who was placed on the disabled list. Collin Balester was optioned to Triple-A Syracuse to clear roster space. He made 10 appearances (five starts) for Washington during the year, registering a 1-1 record and 5.23 ERA with 15 strikeouts across 32 2/3 innings pitched.

Maya spent the entirety of the 2012 campaign with Syracuse, compiling an 11-10 record and 3.88 ERA with 89 strikeouts on 167 innings pitched across 28 starts. After one appearance for Washington in 2013, Maya was designated for assignment following the promotion of Jeff Kobernus on May 25, 2013. He cleared waivers and was sent outright to Syracuse on May 27. Maya was released by the Nationals organization on November 18.

=== Atlanta Braves ===
On December 11, 2013, Maya signed a minor league contract with the Atlanta Braves. He made 17 appearances (14 starts) for the Triple-A Gwinnett Braves, posting a 3-3 record and 2.63 ERA with 64 strikeouts across 85 2/3 innings pitched. On July 11, 2014, Maya was released by the Braves organization.

=== Doosan Bears ===
On July 25, 2014, Maya signed with the Doosan Bears of the KBO League on a one-year, $175,000 contract, replacing Chris Volstad in their starting rotation. Maya pitched to a 2-4 record and a 4.86 ERA in 11 games started for the Bears, who brought him back for the 2015 season. On April 9, 2015, Maya no-hit the Nexen Heroes at home in a 1-0 victory, the 12th no-hitter in the 33-year history of the KBO. He threw 136 pitches and struck out 8 batters in his effort. On June 16, Maya was released by the Bears after the team signed Anthony Swarzak. He had struggled to a 8.17 ERA since hurling his no-hitter.

=== Los Angeles Angels ===
On February 2, 2016, Maya signed a minor league contract with the Los Angeles Angels. Maya made six starts split between the Triple-A Salt Lake Bees and rookie–level Arizona League Angels, posting an aggregate 2–3 record and 5.68 ERA with 15 strikeouts. He elected free agency following the season on November 7.

=== Rieleros De Aguascalientes ===
On June 18, 2018, Maya signed with the Rieleros de Aguascalientes of the Mexican League. In four starts for Aguascalientes, he posted a 1-1 record and 7.13 ERA with eight strikeouts across 17 2/3 innings pitched. Maya was released by the Piratas on August 1.

=== Saraperos de Saltillo ===
On March 1, 2019, Maya signed with the Saraperos de Saltillo of the Mexican League. He was released on April 13, after making two starts for the team, in which he struggled to an 0-1 record and 15.63 ERA with four strikeouts over 6 1/3 innings.

=== Diablos Rojos del México ===
On December 14, 2022, Maya signed with the Diablos Rojos del México of the Mexican Baseball League. In 13 games (12 starts) for México, he recorded a 3.71 ERA with 42 strikeouts over 63 innings of work.

=== Guerreros de Oaxaca ===
On July 19, 2023, Maya was loaned to the Guerreros de Oaxaca of the Mexican League. In 4 starts for Oaxaca, Maya posted a 2–1 record and 6.05 ERA with 10 strikeouts across 19 1/3 innings pitched.

=== Piratas de Campeche ===
On February 13, 2024, Maya signed with the Piratas de Campeche of the Mexican League. In 15 starts for Campeche, he posted a 5–7 record and 4.48 ERA with 49 strikeouts across 74 1/3 innings pitched.

Maya made 15 appearances (eight starts) for the Piratas in 2025, compiling a 1-4 record and 5.92 ERA with 26 strikeouts across 51 2/3 innings pitched. On September 25, 2025, Maya was released by Campeche.

== Coaching career ==
On April 14, 2026, Maya was hired as a coach for the Algodoneros de Unión Laguna of the Mexican League. On June 27, Maya, along with manager Fernando Tatís and bench coach Hiram Bocachica, was dismissed following a 26–34 start that left the team in seventh place in the North Zone.

== See also ==
- List of baseball players who defected from Cuba
