= Taylor Jordan =

American baseball player (born 1989)

- Pitcher
- Born: January 17, 1989 (age 37); Merritt Island, Florida, U.S.
- Batted: Right Threw: Right

Professional debut
- MLB: June 29, 2013, for the Washington Nationals
- CPBL: August 26, 2018, for the Fubon Guardians

Last appearance
- MLB: July 18, 2015, for the Washington Nationals
- CPBL: October 5, 2018, for the Fubon Guardians

MLB statistics
- Win–loss record: 1–8
- Earned run average: 4.48
- Strikeouts: 57

CPBL statistics
- Win–loss record: 2–5
- Earned run average: 5.97
- Strikeouts: 31
- Stats at Baseball Reference

Teams
- Washington Nationals (2013–2015); Fubon Guardians (2018)

Taylor Jordan (born January 17, 1989) is an American former professional baseball pitcher. He played for the Washington Nationals of Major League Baseball (MLB) and the Fubon Guardians of the Chinese Professional Baseball League (CPBL).

== Professional career ==
Jordan was drafted by the Cincinnati Reds in the 18th round of the 2007 Major League Baseball draft out Merritt Island High School in Merritt Island, Florida, but did not sign.

=== Washington Nationals ===
He was then drafted by the Washington Nationals in the ninth round of the 2009 Major League Baseball draft out of Brevard Community College.

He made his professional debut for the Gulf Coast League Nationals in 2009. During the 2010 season he appeared for the Vermont Lake Monsters of the short-season New York–Penn League and the Hagerstown Suns of the South Atlantic League. In 2011, Jordan played for Hagerstown and the New York–Penn League's Auburn Doubledays, before ending the season early and undergoing Tommy John surgery. He split time between Hagerstown and Auburn again in 2012 after his surgery.

Jordan began the 2013 season with the Potomac Nationals of the Carolina League. He was promoted to the Double-A Harrisburg Senators after making six starts for Potomac in which he had a 2–1 record and a 1.24 ERA.

Jordan's contract was selected from Harrisburg on June 29, 2013 and he made his major league debut the same day against the New York Mets. At the time of his promotion, Jordan had made eight starts for Harrisburg and compiled a 7–0 record with a 0.83 ERA.

In 9 starts for the Nationals, Jordan recorded 1 win and 3 losses with an ERA of 3.66.

Jordan opened the season as the Nationals fifth starter in 2014. He was the pitcher who allowed Angels' slugger Albert Pujols's 500th career home run on April 22. He went on to start in 5 games but was inconsistent, going 0-3 with an ERA of 5.61. He was sent down to AAA, where he would start 6 games before being shut down due to an elbow injury.

In 2016, Jordan began the season with the Syracuse Chiefs and made 3 starts, going 0-0 with a 1.72 ERA. The Nationals announced that Jordan would undergo a second Tommy John surgery and would miss the remainder of the 2016 season.

On June 28, 2016, Jordan was released by the Nationals.

=== Sioux City Explorers ===
On March 19, 2018, Jordan signed with the Sioux City Explorers of the independent American Association. He pitched to a 3.29 ERA and 1.20 WHIP over 15 starts and 95.2 innings.

=== Fubon Guardians ===
On August 8, 2018, Jordan was signed by the Fubon Guardians of the Chinese Professional Baseball League (CPBL). He became a free agent following the 2018 season.

=== Return to Sioux City ===
On April 3, 2019, Jordan signed with the Sioux City Explorers of the American Association. Jordan was released by Sioux City on March 13, 2020. In 20 starts and 124.1 innings he went 6-10 with a 4.49 ERA with 95 strikeouts and threw 2 complete game shutouts.

== Pitching style ==
Jordan's repertoire consists of a four-seam fastball at 92–95 mph, a sinker at 91–94 mph, a slider at 82–86 mph, and a changeup at 82–85 mph. He throws mainly sinkers and changeups against left-handed hitters and throws mostly four-seamers, sinkers, and sliders against righties.
