= Erik Davis (baseball) =

American baseball player (born 1986)

- Pitcher
- Born: October 8, 1986 (age 39); San Jose, California
- Batted: Right Threw: Right

MLB debut
- June 2, 2013, for the Washington Nationals

Last MLB appearance
- September 22, 2013, for the Washington Nationals

MLB statistics
- Win–loss record: 1–0
- Earned run average: 3.12
- Strikeouts: 12
- Stats at Baseball Reference

Teams
- Washington Nationals (2013)

Erik Randall Davis (born October 8, 1986) is an American former professional baseball pitcher. He played one year in Major League Baseball (MLB) with the Washington Nationals in 2013.

== Career ==
=== Amateur ===
Davis attended Mountain View High School in Mountain View, California, and Stanford University. In 2006 and 2007, he played collegiate summer baseball with the Brewster Whitecaps of the Cape Cod Baseball League.

=== San Diego Padres ===
The San Diego Padres selected Davis in the 13th round of the 2008 Major League Baseball draft.

=== Washington Nationals ===
On March 28, 2011, the Padres traded Davis and cash considerations to the Washington Nationals in exchange for Alberto González. Davis started the 2013 season with the Triple–A Syracuse Chiefs. The Nationals promoted him to the major leagues for the first time on June 2, 2013. He was optioned back to Syracuse on June 13, and recalled on June 29. Davis was optioned back to Syracuse on July 1 when Bryce Harper was activated from the disabled list. He was recalled again when rosters expanded on September 1.

Davis was placed on the 60–day disabled list with an elbow strain on February 13, 2014. He would miss the remainder of the season. In 2015, Davis split time between Double–A and Triple–A.

Davis was designated for assignment following the signing of Daniel Murphy on January 6, 2016. He cleared waivers and was sent outright to Triple–A Syracuse on January 14. In 45 appearances out of the bullpen for Syracuse, Davis compiled a 7–5 record and 4.13 ERA with 64 strikeouts across 52 1/3 innings pitched. He elected free agency following the season on November 7.

=== Arizona Diamondbacks ===
On November 17, 2016, Davis signed a minor league contract with the Arizona Diamondbacks. In 2017, he made 53 appearances for the Triple–A Reno Aces, posting an 8–2 record and 4.38 ERA with 72 strikeouts and 3 saves in 63 2/3 innings pitched. He elected free agency following the season on November 6, 2017.

=== Milwaukee Brewers ===
On December 18, 2017, Davis signed a minor league contract with the Milwaukee Brewers organization. In 49 relief outings for the Triple–A Colorado Springs Sky Sox, he posted a 4–6 record and 3.99 ERA with 56 strikeouts across 65 1/3 innings pitched. Davis elected free agency following the season on November 2, 2018.

== Repertoire ==
Davis's pitch repertoire consists of a four-seam fastball (94 mph), curveball (78 mph), and changeup (85 mph).
