= Dillon Gee =

American baseball player (born 1986)

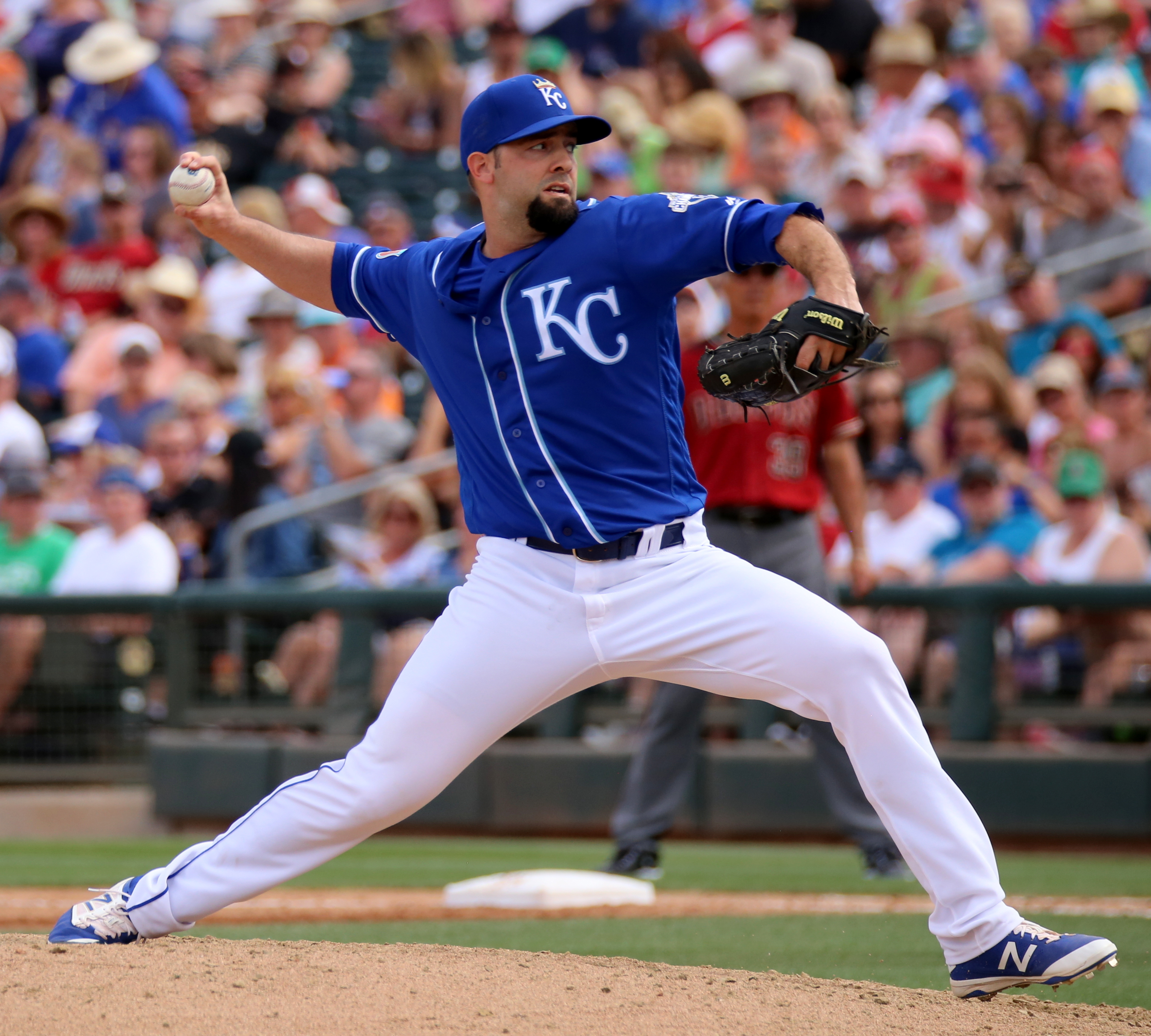
- Gee with the Kansas City Royals in 2016
- Pitcher
- Born: April 28, 1986 (age 40); Cleburne, Texas, U.S.
- Batted: Right Threw: Right

Professional debut
- MLB: September 7, 2010, for the New York Mets
- NPB: March 31, 2018, for the Chunichi Dragons

Last appearance
- MLB: September 30, 2017, for the Minnesota Twins
- NPB: April 21, 2018, for the Chunichi Dragons

MLB statistics
- Win–loss record: 51–48
- Earned run average: 4.09
- Strikeouts: 619

NPB statistics
- Win–loss record: 0–3
- Earned run average: 4.00
- Strikeouts: 16
- Stats at Baseball Reference

Teams
- New York Mets (2010–2015); Kansas City Royals (2016); Texas Rangers (2017); Minnesota Twins (2017); Chunichi Dragons (2018)

Dillon Kyle Gee (born April 28, 1986) is an American former professional baseball pitcher. He played in Major League Baseball (MLB) for the New York Mets, Kansas City Royals, Texas Rangers and Minnesota Twins. In addition, Gee pitched for the Chunichi Dragons of Nippon Professional Baseball (NPB).

== Early life ==
Dillon Gee was born on April 28, 1986, in Cleburne, Texas, the second son of Kevin, a Fort Worth Fire Department fireman, and Kelly Gee. His brother Jared is five years his senior.

Gee played baseball at Cleburne High School in Cleburne. In his first start in his senior year, Gee pitched a no-hitter, falling one out short of a perfect game. He later threw a second no-hitter, finishing the year as the team's Most Valuable Player and earning first team all-state and all-district honors. As a batter, he hit .443 with six home runs and 46 RBI in his senior year. He also played for the school's golf team.

== Collegiate career ==
In 2005, Gee attended the University of Texas at Arlington and played baseball for the Mavericks. At UT Arlington, Gee helped the Mavericks to a berth in the 2006 NCAA tournament. He ranks second on the school's career list with 298.1 innings pitched and was a two-time honorable mention All-Southland Conference recipient (2005 and 2006).

== Professional career ==
=== New York Mets ===
==== 2007–2009 ====
Gee was drafted by the New York Mets in the 21st round of the Major League Baseball draft and began his professional career with the Class-A Brooklyn Cyclones of the New York–Penn League. He initially worked mostly out of the bullpen, yet by season's end, Gee was starting and amassed a 3–1 record with a 2.28 ERA as a starter. In 2008, Gee had a break out year with the Class-A St. Lucie Mets of the Florida State League (FSL), winning the Sterling Award and being named to the FSL All-Star team. Later in 2008, Gee was promoted to the Class-AA Binghamton Mets of the Eastern League, where he went 2–0 with a 1.33 ERA in four games. In 2009, Gee started the season with the Class-AAA Buffalo Bisons of the International League, yet was shut down May 25 due to a torn labrum in his right shoulder.

==== 2010 ====
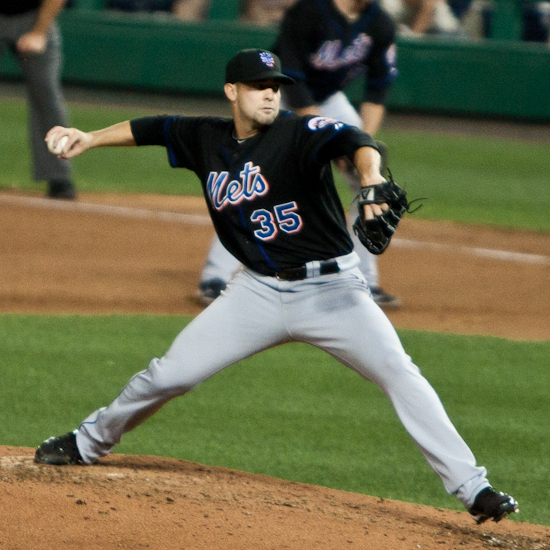
Gee pitching for the New York Mets in his debut

In 2010, Gee had a bounce back season and recouped his health after his season-ending injury in 2009. He went 13–8 for Buffalo, and led Class-AAA with 165 strikeouts in 161 1/3 innings, yet he gave up more than a hit per inning and finished with a 4.96 ERA. Nonetheless, Gee made his major league debut with the Mets on September 7, marking the first time in Mets history that two starting pitchers made their major league debuts in the same game, as Gee faced rookie Yunesky Maya of the Washington Nationals. Gee also became the first Mets pitcher to record an RBI in his major league debut. He pitched brilliantly in his debut, taking a no-hit bid into the sixth inning when Willie Harris broke it up with a lead off home run. Gee finished allowing only two hits and one run in seven innings. Gee stayed with Mets until the end of the season, compiling a 2–2 record with a 2.18 ERA in five starts.

==== 2011 ====
The Mets recalled Gee to the major leagues on April 17, from the Buffalo Bisons, where he went 1–1 with a 4.63 ERA in two starts. Gee then went on to go 7–0 with a 2.86 ERA in his first nine games as a starting pitcher. Gee was off to the best start by a New York Mets rookie to open a season in franchise history, exceeding Jon Matlack's 6–0 start in 1972. He ended the season at 13–6 with a 4.43 ERA in 30 games.

==== 2012 ====
Gee broke camp with the Mets as their fifth starter. To begin the season, Gee had a rough stretch posting 5.65 ERA through his first seven starts. In that stretch, Gee surrendered a career-high 12 hits in his start against the San Francisco Giants on April 23. Gee then went on to win consecutive games against the Toronto Blue Jays and San Diego Padres; in the latter, he posted a career-high nine strikeouts over seven innings. On June 20, Gee matched his career high in strikeouts against the Baltimore Orioles and improved to 5–5 on the season. Gee ended the first half of the season at 6–7 with a 4.10 ERA in 17 starts and was scheduled to open the team's second half in Atlanta. But on July 10, Gee was indefinitely placed on the disabled list after a clot in the artery of his right shoulder was discovered. He decided to undergo surgery at Barnes-Jewish Hospital in St. Louis, to address the issue. The surgery shut him down for the rest of the season. Gee finished the season at 6–7 with a 4.10 ERA in 109 2/3 innings pitched, with 97 strikeouts and 29 bases on balls.

==== 2013 ====
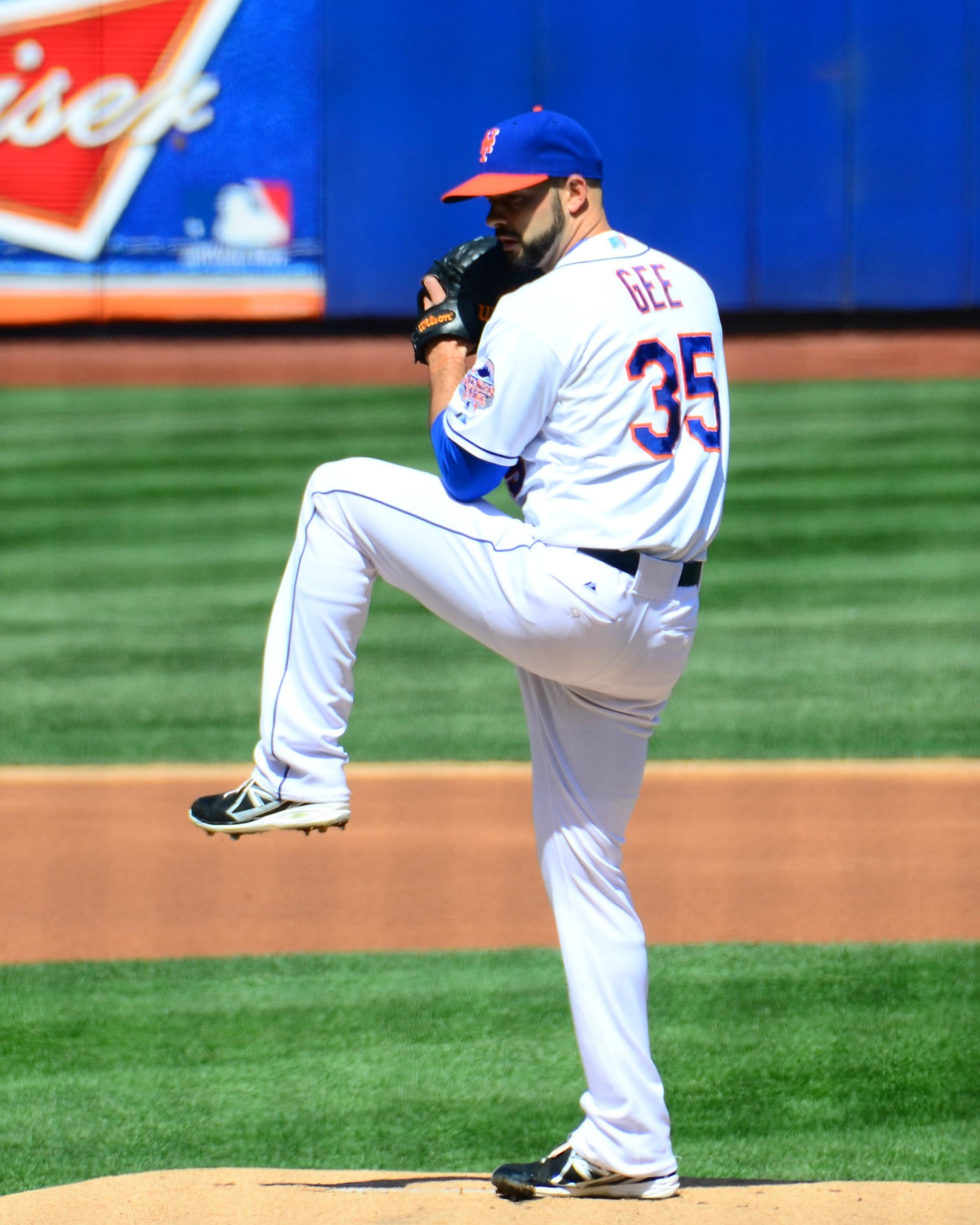
Gee with the Mets in 2013

On May 30, 2013, Gee recorded a career-high 12 strikeouts in a game which led to the Mets sweeping the Subway Series against the New York Yankees for the first time ever. On June 17, 2013, Gee hurled 8 1/3 shutout innings against the Atlanta Braves before allowing a 2-run walk-off home run to Freddie Freeman.

After a horrible start to the season, Gee bounced back to become the team's second-best starter, behind Matt Harvey. Gee was the only member of the Mets' Opening Day rotation to last the entire season. In 32 starts in 2013, he went 12–11 with a 3.62 ERA and 16 quality starts, striking out 142 in 199 innings.

==== 2014 ====
Gee was named the Mets' opening day starter at Citi Field for 2014. He had eight starts and went 3–1 with a 2.73 ERA, before being placed on the disabled list with a strained right latissimus dorsi on May 15. After six weeks on the disabled list, Gee made his first start on July 9, against the Atlanta Braves at home, going seven innings and giving up one run on six hits to earn the win.

==== 2015 ====
During spring training, Gee was preparing to accept a role in the Mets' bullpen when it was announced that starting pitcher Zack Wheeler would miss the entire 2015 season due to injury. Gee therefore began the 2015 season in the Mets' starting rotation. On May 8, Gee was placed on the disabled list with a groin strain and was replaced in the rotation by top prospect Noah Syndergaard. He was eventually returned to the active roster on June 3, at which point the Mets announced plans to use a six-man starting rotation. However, after one poor start, the Mets announced plans to return Gee to the bullpen. A frustrated Gee told the media, "I'm almost at the point now where I just don't even care anymore. I mean, I'm kind of just over it all." Gee was designated for assignment by the Mets on June 15. On June 21 Gee was sent to the Las Vegas 51s.

On October 7, 2015, Gee opted out of his contract, making him a free agent. In 2015, Gee went 0–3 in eight games, seven of which he started, with a 5.90 ERA. In the minors with the 51s, Gee went 8–3 with a 4.58 ERA in 14 starts.

=== Kansas City Royals ===
On December 14, 2015, Gee signed a minor league deal with the Kansas City Royals. He had his contract selected to the major league roster on March 15, 2016. He elected free agency after being outrighted on November 8, 2016.

=== Texas Rangers ===
On January 17, 2017, Gee signed a minor league deal with the Texas Rangers. He elected free agency on June 18, 2017.

=== Minnesota Twins ===
On June 22, 2017, Gee signed a minor league contract with the Minnesota Twins. On June 23, Gee's contract was selected by the Twins. He became a free agent following the season.

=== Chunichi Dragons ===
On January 4, 2018, it was announced that Gee had signed a one-year contract with the Chunichi Dragons of Nippon Professional Baseball worth JP¥120 million (US$1.06 million). He became a free agent following the season.

=== Retirement ===
Gee announced his retirement from baseball on January 28, 2019.

== Personal life ==
Gee is married to Kari Ann and his hobbies include hunting and golf. On November 16, 2013, Dillon's wife gave birth to their first child, named Hudson Kyle.
