= Jeff Kobernus =

American baseball player (born 1988)

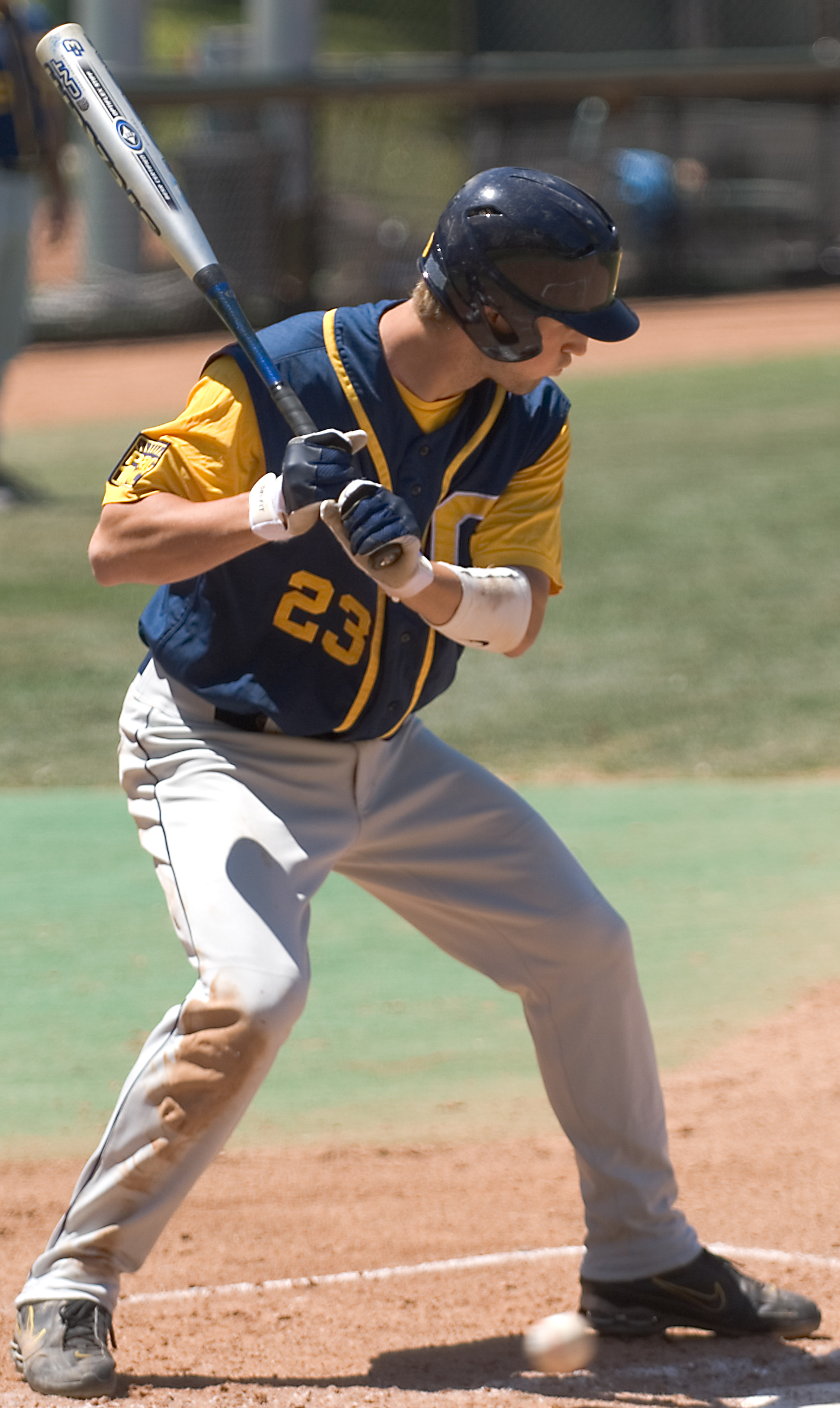
- Kobernus with Cal in 2007
- Outfielder / Second baseman
- Born: June 30, 1988 (age 38); San Leandro, California, U.S.
- Batted: Right Threw: Right

MLB debut
- May 25, 2013, for the Washington Nationals

Last MLB appearance
- September 28, 2014, for the Washington Nationals

MLB statistics
- Batting average: .139
- Home runs: 1
- Runs batted in: 1
- Stolen bases: 3
- Stats at Baseball Reference

Teams
- Washington Nationals (2013–2014)

Jeffrey Gilbert Kobernus (born June 30, 1988) is an American former professional baseball second baseman. He played in Major League Baseball (MLB) for the Washington Nationals.

== Career ==
=== Amateur ===
Kobernus attended Bishop O'Dowd High School in Oakland, California and the University of California, Berkeley, where he played college baseball for the Cal Golden Bears baseball team. In 2008, he played collegiate summer baseball with the Cotuit Kettleers of the Cape Cod Baseball League.

=== Washington Nationals ===
The Washington Nationals drafted Kobernus in the second round, with the 50th overall selection, of the 2009 MLB draft. After the 2012 season, the Boston Red Sox selected Kobernus in the Rule 5 draft and traded him to the Detroit Tigers. Kobernus competed for a spot with the Tigers as a left fielder but was returned to the Nationals during spring training.

Kobernus was called up to the Nationals from the Syracuse Chiefs of the Triple-A International League on May 25, 2013. He made his major league debut that day as a pinch runner. He hit his only MLB home run on June 18, as a pinch hitter against the Philadelphia Phillies. He played in 15 games, starting only six of them, before he was sent back to the minors in at the end of June. He returned to the Nationals in September, playing 9 games, six of them as a pinch runner. He finished 2013 with a .167 batting average with the home run his lone extra base hit and RBI. He stole three bases but was caught stealing twice. After another season in the minors, Kobernus appeared in 4 games for the Nationals in 2014, now as a second baseman. He batted 0-for-6 with one walk.

The Nationals released Kobernus during spring training in 2015. He played for three minor league teams in the San Francisco Giants organization in 2015, batting a combined .231/.288/.276.

=== Lancaster Barnstormers ===
On March 15, 2016, Kobernus signed with the Lancaster Barnstormers of the Atlantic League of Professional Baseball. Bench coach and baseball operations manager Ross Peeples said in a press release: "He is a guy the Nationals moved from second base to the outfield, and he wants to go back to his original position". In 55 appearances for Lancaster, Kobernus batted .295/.313/.335 with one home run, 22 RBI, and 22 stolen bases.

Kobernus played in only seven games for the Barnstormers in 2017, going 9-for-29 (.310) with two stolen bases.

=== Seattle Mariners ===
On May 18, 2017, Kobernus signed a minor league contract with the Seattle Mariners. He played for the Double-A Arkansas Travelers. He was released on August 13 after batting .222 with 4 doubles in 44 games.

== See also ==
- Rule 5 draft results
