= 2013 San Francisco Giants season =

2013 San Francisco Giants
- League: National League
- Division: West
- Ballpark: AT&T Park
- City: San Francisco, California
- Record: 76–86 (.469)
- Divisional place: 4th
- Owners: Larry Baer (managing general partner)
- General managers: Brian Sabean
- Managers: Bruce Bochy
- Television: KNTV (NBC Bay Area 11) (Jon Miller, Mike Krukow, Duane Kuiper); CSN Bay Area (Duane Kuiper, Mike Krukow, Dave Flemming, Jon Miller)
- Radio: KNBR (680 AM) (Jon Miller, Dave Flemming, Duane Kuiper, Mike Krukow); KTRB (860 AM, Spanish) (Erwin Higueros, Tito Fuentes)
- Stats: ESPN.com; Baseball Reference

The 2013 San Francisco Giants season was the Giants' 131st year in Major League Baseball, their 56th year in San Francisco since their move from New York following the 1957 season, and their 14th at AT&T Park. They entered the season as the defending World Series champions.

== Season standings ==
=== National League West ===
NL West
Team	W	L	Pct.	GB	Home	Road
Los Angeles Dodgers	92	70	.568	—	47‍–‍34	45‍–‍36
Arizona Diamondbacks	81	81	.500	11	45‍–‍36	36‍–‍45
San Diego Padres	76	86	.469	16	45‍–‍36	31‍–‍50
San Francisco Giants	76	86	.469	16	42‍–‍40	34‍–‍46
Colorado Rockies	74	88	.457	18	45‍–‍36	29‍–‍52

=== National League Wild Card ===
Division winners
Team	W	L	Pct.
St. Louis Cardinals	97	65	.599
Atlanta Braves	96	66	.593
Los Angeles Dodgers	92	70	.568

Wild Card teams (Top 2 teams qualify for postseason)
Team	W	L	Pct.	GB
Pittsburgh Pirates	94	68	.580	+4
Cincinnati Reds	90	72	.556	—
Washington Nationals	86	76	.531	4
Arizona Diamondbacks	81	81	.500	9
San Francisco Giants	76	86	.469	14
San Diego Padres	76	86	.469	14
Colorado Rockies	74	88	.457	16
New York Mets	74	88	.457	16
Milwaukee Brewers	74	88	.457	16
Philadelphia Phillies	73	89	.451	17
Chicago Cubs	66	96	.407	24
Miami Marlins	62	100	.383	28

== Record vs. opponents ==
2013 National League record Source: MLB Standings Grid – 2013
Team	AZ	ATL	CHC	CIN	COL	LAD	MIA	MIL	NYM	PHI	PIT	SD	SF	STL	WSH	AL
Arizona	—	2–4	4–3	3–4	12–7	10–9	4–2	6–1	3–4	3–4	3–3	7–12	7–12	4–3	2–4	11–9
Atlanta	4–2	—	5–1	4–3	6–1	5–2	13–6	2–4	10–9	11–8	4–3	1–5	3–4	4–3	13–6	11–9
Chicago	3–4	1–5	—	5–14	3–3	1–6	4–3	6–13	3–3	3–3	7–12	3–4	4–3	7–12	3–4	13–7
Cincinnati	4–3	3–4	14–5	—	2–4	4–3	6–1	10–9	4–2	4–2	8–11	3–3	6–1	8–11	3–4	11–9
Colorado	7–12	1–6	3–3	4–2	—	10–9	3–4	4–2	3–4	3–4	4–2	12–7	9–10	3–4	3–4	5–15
Los Angeles	9–10	2–5	6–1	3–4	9–10	—	5–2	4–2	5–1	5–2	4–2	11–8	8–11	4–3	5–1	12–8
Miami	2–4	6–13	3–4	1–6	4–3	2–5	—	1–5	11–8	7–12	2–4	3–4	4–3	2–4	5–14	9–11
Milwaukee	1–6	4–2	13–6	9–10	2–4	2–4	5–1	—	4–3	5–2	7–12	3–4	5–2	5–14	3–4	6–14
New York	4–3	9–10	3–3	2–4	4–3	1–5	8–11	3–4	—	10–9	2–5	4–3	4–2	2–5	7–12	11–9
Philadelphia	4–3	8–11	3–3	2–4	4–3	2–5	12–7	2–5	9–10	—	3–4	4–2	3–3	2–5	8–11	7–13
Pittsburgh	3–3	3–4	12–7	11–8	2–4	2–4	4–2	12–7	5–2	4–3	—	3–4	4–3	10–9	4–3	15–5
San Diego	12–7	5–1	4–3	3–3	7–12	8–11	4–3	4–3	3–4	2–4	4–3	—	8–11	2–4	2–5	8–12
San Francisco	12–7	4–3	3–4	1–6	10–9	11–8	3–4	2–5	2–4	3–3	3–4	11–8	—	2–4	3–3	6–14
St. Louis	3–4	3–4	12–7	11–8	4–3	3–4	4–2	14–5	5–2	5–2	9–10	4–2	4–2	—	6–0	10–10
Washington	4–2	6–13	4–3	4–3	4–3	1–5	14–5	4–3	12–7	11–8	3–4	5–2	3–3	0–6	—	11–9

== Events ==
- November 1, 2012: The Giants decline to exercise a club option on IF Aubrey Huff and allow him to become a free agent.
- November 14, 2012: The Giants re-sign LHP Jeremy Affeldt to a three-year contract.
- November 30, 2012: The Giants tender contracts to arbitration-eligible players IF Joaquín Árias, OF Gregor Blanco, RHP Santiago Casilla, LHP José Mijares, OF Hunter Pence, C Buster Posey and RHP Sergio Romo. Injured RHP Brian Wilson is non-tendered and becomes a free agent.
- December 3, 2012: The Giants re-sign free agent OF Ángel Pagán to a four-year contract.
- December 4, 2012: The Giants re-sign free agent IF Marco Scutaro to a three-year contract.
- December 13, 2012: Free agent and former Giant OF Andrés Torres signs with the team on a one-year contract.
- January 17–18, 2013: The Giants avoid arbitration with José Mijares, Buster Posey, Hunter Pence, and Gregor Blanco by signing to one-year deals.
- January 25, 2013: The Giants claim INF Tony Abreu off waivers from Kansas City Royals.
- February 5, 2013: The Giants avoid arbitration with RHP Sergio Romo by agreeing to a two-year contract.
- March 29, 2013: The Giants and C Buster Posey come to terms on an 8-year contract with club option.
- March 31, 2013: Spring training concludes with newcomers RHP Chad Gaudin, IF Nick Noonan, and C Guillermo Quiróz added to the 25-man roster.
- May 20, 2013: RHP Ryan Vogelsong dislocates and fractures the pinky on his right hand while batting.
- May 25, 2013: OF Ángel Pagán hits an inside-the-park walk-off home run in the bottom of the 10th inning to beat the Colorado Rockies 6–5. Pagan is the first MLB player to complete this feat since Rey Sanchez for the Tampa Bay Rays on June 11, 2004, in a 10th-inning victory over the same Colorado Rockies. Pagan is also the first Giants player to do this since Bill Terry did it on August 24, 1931, when the New York Giants defeated the Chicago Cubs 2–1.
- June 25, 2013: OF Ángel Pagán undergoes surgery on a torn tendon in his left hamstring, sidelining him for approximately 12 weeks.
- July 2, 2013: The Giants are no-hit by Homer Bailey at Great American Ball Park in a 3–0 loss to the Cincinnati Reds.
- July 9, 2013: The Giants sign OF Jeff Francoeur to a minor-league deal, his contract was purchased four days later.
- July 13, 2013: RHP Tim Lincecum pitches the 15th no-hitter in Giants history at Petco Park against the San Diego Padres, the first of his career. Lincecum made 148 pitches, the second highest number of pitches in a no-hitter in MLB history, striking out 13 Padres.
- July 16, 2013: The 84th MLB All-Star Game takes place with LHP Madison Bumgarner, RHP Sergio Romo and IF Marco Scutaro being selected to their first All-Star rosters, and C Buster Posey to his second.
- August 22, 2013: RHP Matt Cain is struck with a batted ball while pitching, resulting in his being placed on the disabled list for the first time in his career.
- September 3, 2013: Highly regarded prospect RHP Heath Hembree makes his major league debut in a game at Petco Park.
- September 6, 2013: RHP Yusmeiro Petit pitches a one-hit shutout against the Arizona Diamondbacks. Petit was just one strike away from pitching a perfect game before pinch-hitter Eric Chavez singled.
- September 11, 2013: With a victory by the Reds in Cincinnati, the Giants are mathematically eliminated from postseason contention, thus becoming the 13th consecutive team to fail to defend their World Championship.
- September 28, 2013: It is reported that the Giants and OF Hunter Pence have agreed to a 5-year contract extension.
- September 29, 2013: As the regular season concludes, Hunter Pence becomes the first Giant of the San Francisco era to start all 162 games in a season.
- October 22, 2013: RHP Tim Lincecum agrees to a new 2-year contract, avoiding free agency.

== Game log and schedule ==
All schedule and scores taken from MLB.com.

Legend
	Giants win
	Giants loss
	Postponement
**Bold**	Giants team member

2013 Game Log
April (15–12)

#	Date	Opponent	Score	Win	Loss	Save	Attendance	Record
1	April 1	@ Dodgers	0–4	Clayton Kershaw (1–0)	**George Kontos** (0–1)		53,138	0–1
2	April 2	@ Dodgers	3–0	**Madison Bumgarner** (1–0)	Hyun-Jin Ryu (0–1)	**Sergio Romo** (1)	45,431	1–1
3	April 3	@ Dodgers	5–3	**Tim Lincecum** (1–0)	Josh Beckett (0–1)	**Sergio Romo** (2)	52,906	2–1
4	April 5	Cardinals	1–0	**Barry Zito** (1–0)	Jake Westbrook (0–1)	**Sergio Romo** (3)	41,581	3–1
5	April 6	Cardinals	3–6	Shelby Miller (1–0)	**Ryan Vogelsong** (0–1)	Mitchell Boggs (1)	41,402	3–2
6	April 7	Cardinals	3–14	Adam Wainwright (1–1)	**Matt Cain** (0–1)		42,201	3–3
7	April 8	Rockies	4–2	**Madison Bumgarner** (2–0)	Jorge de la Rosa (0–1)	**Sergio Romo** (4)	41,133	4–3
8	April 9	Rockies	9–6	**Santiago Casilla** (1–0)	Matt Belisle (0–1)	**Sergio Romo** (5)	41,910	5–3
9	April 10	Rockies	10–0	**Barry Zito** (2–0)	Jeff Francis (1–1)		41,606	6–3
10	April 11	@ Cubs	7–6	**Ryan Vogelsong** (1–1)	Scott Feldman (0–2)	**Sergio Romo** (6)	25,460	7–3
11	April 12	@ Cubs	3–4	Kyuji Fujikawa (1–0)	**Sergio Romo** (0–1)		30,996	7–4
12	April 13	@ Cubs	3–2	**Madison Bumgarner** (3–0)	Jeff Samardzija (1–2)	**Santiago Casilla** (1)	34,778	8–4
13	April 14	@ Cubs	10–7 (10)	**George Kontos** (1–1)	Shawn Camp (0–1)	**Sergio Romo** (7)	33,326	9–4
14	April 16	@ Brewers	8–10	Brandon Kintzler (2–0)	**Barry Zito** (2–1)	Jim Henderson (2)	29,075	9–5
15	April 17	@ Brewers	3–4	Jim Henderson (2–0)	**Santiago Casilla** (1–1)		29,362	9–6
16	April 18	@ Brewers	2–7	Yovani Gallardo (1–1)	**Matt Cain** (0–2)		29,161	9–7
17	April 19	Padres	3–2	**Santiago Casilla** (2–1)	Luke Gregerson (1–2)		41,559	10–7
18	April 20	Padres	2–0	**Tim Lincecum** (2–0)	Andrew Cashner (0–1)	**Sergio Romo** (8)	41,995	11–7
19	April 21	Padres	5–0	**Barry Zito** (3–1)	Eric Stults (2–2)		42,747	12–7
20	April 22	Diamondbacks	5–4	**Sergio Romo** (1–1)	Tony Sipp (1–1)		41,294	13–7
21	April 23	Diamondbacks	4–6 (11)	Brad Ziegler (1–0)	**Santiago Casilla** (2–2)	Matt Reynolds (1)	41,955	13–8
22	April 24	Diamondbacks	2–3 (10)	David Hernandez (1–1)	**Chad Gaudin** (0–1)	Matt Reynolds (2)	41,756	13–9
23	April 26	@ Padres	1–2	Andrew Cashner (1–1)	**Tim Lincecum** (2–1)	Huston Street (4)	34,929	13–10
24	April 27	@ Padres	7–8 (12)	Joe Thatcher (1–0)	**Sergio Romo** (1–2)		38,823	13–11
25	April 28	@ Padres	4–6	Jason Marquis (2–2)	**Ryan Vogelsong** (1–2)	Huston Street (5)	33,722	13–12
26	April 29	@ Diamondbacks	6–4	**Jean Machi** (1–0)	Brad Ziegler (1–1)	**Sergio Romo** (9)	18,036	14–12
27	April 30	@ Diamondbacks	2–1	**Sandy Rosario** (1–0)	J. J. Putz (1–1)	**Sergio Romo** (10)	20,319	15–12

May (14–13)

#	Date	Opponent	Score	Win	Loss	Save	Attendance	Record
28	May 1	@ Diamondbacks	9–6	**George Kontos** (2–1)	David Hernandez (1–2)	**Sergio Romo** (11)	21,277	16–12
29	May 3	Dodgers	2–1	**Sergio Romo** (2–2)	Ronald Belisario (2–3)		42,113	17–12
30	May 4	Dodgers	10–9 (10)	**Santiago Casilla** (3–2)	Brandon League (0–1)		41,171	18–12
31	May 5	Dodgers	4–3	**Matt Cain** (1–2)	Hyun-Jin Ryu (3–2)	**Sergio Romo** (12)	41,140	19–12
32	May 6	Phillies	2–6	Cliff Lee (3–2)	**Madison Bumgarner** (3–1)		41,171	19–13
33	May 7	Phillies	2–6	Kyle Kendrick (4–1)	**Tim Lincecum** (2–2)		41,226	19–14
34	May 8	Phillies	4–3 (10)	**Javier López** (1–0)	Antonio Bastardo (1–1)		41,048	20–14
35	May 9	Braves	3–6	Julio Teherán (2–0)	**Ryan Vogelsong** (1–3)	Craig Kimbrel (11)	41,365	20–15
36	May 10	Braves	8–2	**Matt Cain** (2–2)	Tim Hudson (4–2)		41,387	21–15
37	May 11	Braves	10–1	**Madison Bumgarner** (4–1)	Paul Maholm (4–4)		41,530	22–15
38	May 12	Braves	5–1	**Tim Lincecum** (3–2)	Kris Medlen (1–5)		42,231	23–15
39	May 14	@ Blue Jays	6–10	R. A. Dickey (3–5)	**Barry Zito** (3–2)		31,753	23–16
40	May 15	@ Blue Jays	3–11	Ramón Ortiz (1–1)	**Ryan Vogelsong** (1–4)		32,863	23–17
41	May 16	@ Rockies	8–6	**Matt Cain** (3–2)	Jhoulys Chacín (3–3)	**Sergio Romo** (13)	33,128	24–17
42	May 17	@ Rockies	9–10	Jorge de la Rosa (5–3)	**Madison Bumgarner** (4–2)	Rafael Betancourt (10)	43,365	24–18
43	May 18	@ Rockies	2–10	Tyler Chatwood (2–0)	**Tim Lincecum** (3–3)		41,412	24–19
44	May 19	@ Rockies	0–5	Juan Nicasio (4–1)	**Barry Zito** (3–3)		47,494	24–20
45	May 20	Nationals	8–0	**Ryan Vogelsong** (2–4)	Zach Duke (0–1)		41,963	25–20
46	May 21	Nationals	4–2 (10)	**Jeremy Affeldt** (1–0)	Yunesky Maya (0–1)		41,642	26–20
47	May 22	Nationals	1–2 (10)	Tyler Clippard (3–1)	**Jeremy Affeldt** (1–1)	Rafael Soriano (13)	41,175	26–21
48	May 24	Rockies	0–5	Tyler Chatwood (3–0)	**Tim Lincecum** (3–4)		41,881	26–22
49	May 25	Rockies	6–5 (10)	**Sergio Romo** (3–2)	Rafael Betancourt (1–2)		41,784	27–22
50	May 26	Rockies	7–3	**Matt Cain** (4–2)	Jon Garland (3–6)		42,597	28–22
51	May 27	@ Athletics	1–4	Dan Straily (3–2)	**Madison Bumgarner** (4–3)	Grant Balfour (11)	36,067	28–23
52	May 28	@ Athletics	3–6	Jarrod Parker (3–6)	**Michael Kickham** (0–1)		35,067	28–24
53	May 29	Athletics	6–9	Tommy Milone (5–5)	**Tim Lincecum** (3–5)	Grant Balfour (12)	41,512	28–25
54	May 30	Athletics	5–2	**Barry Zito** (4–3)	A.J. Griffin (5–4)	**Sergio Romo** (14)	41,250	29–25
55	May 31	@ Cardinals	Game Postponed (rain) (to be made up as a doubleheader on 6/1)					

June (10–17)

#	Date	Opponent	Score	Win	Loss	Save	Attendance	Record
55	June 1	@ Cardinals	0–8	Shelby Miller (6–3)	**Matt Cain** (4–3)		42,359	29–26
56	June 1	@ Cardinals	1–7	Adam Wainwright (8–3)	**Madison Bumgarner** (4–4)		42,175	29–27
57	June 2	@ Cardinals	4–2	**Chad Gaudin** (1–1)	Tyler Lyons (2–1)	**Sergio Romo** (15)	43,817	30–27
58	June 4	Blue Jays	2–1	**Tim Lincecum** (4–5)	Josh Johnson (0–2)	**Sergio Romo** (16)	41,981	31–27
59	June 5	Blue Jays	0–4	R. A. Dickey (5–7)	**Barry Zito** (4–4)	Casey Janssen (12)	41,559	31–28
60	June 7	@ Diamondbacks	1–3	Brad Ziegler (3–1)	**Jeremy Affeldt** (1–2)	Heath Bell (11)	37,542	31–29
61	June 8	@ Diamondbacks	10–5	**Madison Bumgarner** (5–4)	Trevor Cahill (3–7)		44,574	32–29
62	June 9	@ Diamondbacks	6–2	**Chad Gaudin** (2–1)	Tyler Skaggs (1–1)		38,222	33–29
63	June 11	@ Pirates	2–8	Gerrit Cole (1–0)	**Tim Lincecum** (4–6)		30,614	33–30
64	June 12	@ Pirates	8–12	Francisco Liriano (5–2)	**Barry Zito** (4–5)		19,966	33–31
65	June 13	@ Pirates	10–0	**Matt Cain** (5–3)	Charlie Morton (0–1)		22,532	34–31
66	June 14	@ Braves	6–0	**Madison Bumgarner** (6–4)	Kris Medlen (3–7)		45,833	35–31
67	June 15	@ Braves	5–6	Craig Kimbrel (2–1)	**Sergio Romo** (3–3)		47,178	35–32
68	June 16	@ Braves	0–3	Julio Teherán (5–3)	**Tim Lincecum** (4–7)	Craig Kimbrel (19)	33,681	35–33
69	June 17	Padres	3–5 (13)	Nick Vincent (1–0)	**José Mijares** (0–1)	Huston Street (14)	41,981	35–34
70	June 18	Padres	5–4	**Jean Machi** (2–0)	Dale Thayer (0–3)	**Sergio Romo** (17)	41,884	36–34
71	June 19	Padres	4–2	**Madison Bumgarner** (7–4)	Luke Gregerson (4–3)	**Sergio Romo** (18)	41,866	37–34
72	June 20	Marlins	1–2	Tom Koehler (1–5)	**Jeremy Affeldt** (1–3)	Steve Cishek (11)	41,290	37–35
73	June 21	Marlins	3–6	A.J. Ramos (1–2)	**Jake Dunning** (0–1)	Steve Cishek (12)	41,490	37–36
74	June 22	Marlins	2–1 (11)	**Sandy Rosario** (2–0)	Mike Dunn (2–2)		41,683	38–36
75	June 23	Marlins	2–7	Nate Eovaldi (1–0)	**Matt Cain** (5–4)		41,697	38–37
76	June 24	@ Dodgers	1–3	Paco Rodriguez (2–2)	**Madison Bumgarner** (7–5)	Kenley Jansen (5)	40,994	38–38
77	June 25	@ Dodgers	5–6	Stephen Fife (2–2)	**Michael Kickham** (0–2)	Paco Rodriguez (1)	47,193	38–39
78	June 26	@ Dodgers	2–4	Clayton Kershaw (6–5)	**Tim Lincecum** (4–8)	Kenley Jansen (6)	41,721	38–40
79	June 28	@ Rockies	1–4	Jhoulys Chacín (7–3)	**Barry Zito** (4–6)		38,428	38–41
80	June 29	@ Rockies	1–2	Rafael Betancourt (2–3)	**Jeremy Affeldt** (1–4)		44,612	38–42
81	June 30	@ Rockies	5–2	**Madison Bumgarner** (8–5)	Drew Pomeranz (0–1)	**Sergio Romo** (19)	41,845	39–42

July (8–17)

#	Date	Opponent	Score	Win	Loss	Save	Attendance	Record
82	July 1	@ Reds	1–8 (6)	Bronson Arroyo (7–6)	**Michael Kickham** (0–3)		30,702	39–43
83	July 2	@ Reds	0–3	Homer Bailey (5–6)	**Tim Lincecum** (4–9)		27,509	39–44
84	July 3	@ Reds	2–3 (11)	J.J. Hoover (2–5)	**Javier López** (1–1)		40,757	39–45
--	July 4	@ Reds	PPD, RAIN; rescheduled for July 23 at AT&T Park					
85	July 5	Dodgers	2–10	Hyun-Jin Ryu (7–3)	**Matt Cain** (5–5)		41,911	39–46
86	July 6	Dodgers	4–2	**Madison Bumgarner** (9–5)	Stephen Fife (3–3)	**Sergio Romo** (20)	41,638	40–46
87	July 7	Dodgers	1–4	Clayton Kershaw (8–5)	**Sergio Romo** (3–4)	Kenley Jansen (9)	41,094	40–47
88	July 8	Mets	3–4 (16)	Josh Edgin (1–1)	**George Kontos** (2–2)	Bobby Parnell (16)	41,497	40–48
89	July 9	Mets	6–10	Scott Rice (4–5)	**José Mijares** (0–2)		41,534	40–49
90	July 10	Mets	2–7	Zack Wheeler (3–1)	**Matt Cain** (5–6)		41,679	40–50
91	July 11	@ Padres	4–2	**Madison Bumgarner** (10–5)	Luke Gregerson (4–5)	**Sergio Romo** (21)	31,976	41–50
92	July 12	@ Padres	10–1	**Chad Gaudin** (3–1)	Sean O'Sullivan (0–1)		42,361	42–50
93	July 13	@ Padres	9–0	**Tim Lincecum** (5–9)	Edinson Vólquez (6–8)		40,342	43–50
94	July 14	@ Padres	1–10	Eric Stults (8–7)	**Barry Zito** (4–7)		33,243	43–51
95	July 19	Diamondbacks	2–0	**Chad Gaudin** (4–1)	Ian Kennedy (3–7)	**Sergio Romo** (22)	41,924	44–51
96	July 20	Diamondbacks	4–3	**Matt Cain** (6–6)	Wade Miley (6–8)	**Sergio Romo** (23)	41,742	45–51
97	July 21	Diamondbacks	1–3	Randall Delgado (2–3)	**Madison Bumgarner** (10–6)	Brad Ziegler (4)	41,949	45–52
98	July 22	Reds	0–11	Bronson Arroyo (9–7)	**Tim Lincecum** (5–10)		41,797	45–53
100	July 23	Reds	3–9	Tony Cingrani (4–1)	**Eric Surkamp** (0–1)			45–54
101	July 23	@ Reds (Note: At AT&T Park. The Giants wore their road uniforms and batted first in each inning. However, this counted as a home game for statistical purposes.)	5–3	**Santiago Casilla** (4–2)	Greg Reynolds (0–1)	**Sergio Romo** (24)	42,310	46–54
101	July 24	Reds	3–8	Mike Leake (10–4)	**Chad Gaudin** (4–2)		41,512	46–55
102	July 26	Cubs	2–3	Matt Guerrier (4–4)	**Sergio Romo** (3–5)	Kevin Gregg (20)	41,797	46–56
103	July 27	Cubs	0–1	Pedro Strop (1–3)	**Sergio Romo** (3–6)	Kevin Gregg (21)	41,953	46–57
104	July 28	Cubs	1–2	Travis Wood (7–7)	**Tim Lincecum** (5–11)	Kevin Gregg (22)	41,608	46–58
105	July 30	@ Phillies	3–7	John Lannan (3–4)	**Barry Zito** (4–8)		36,492	46–59
106	July 31	@ Phillies	9–2	**Chad Gaudin** (5–2)	Kyle Kendrick (9–8)		34,067	47–59

August (13–16)

#	Date	Opponent	Score	Win	Loss	Save	Attendance	Record
107	August 1	@ Phillies	2–1	**Matt Cain** (7–6)	Jonathan Papelbon (2–1)	**Sergio Romo** (25)	33,645	48–59
108	August 2	@ Rays	4–1	**Madison Bumgarner** (11–6)	Chris Archer (6–4)	**Sergio Romo** (26)	20,144	49–59
109	August 3	@ Rays	1–2 (10)	Fernando Rodney (4–2)	**Jean Machi** (2–1)		31,969	49–60
110	August 4	@ Rays	3–4	Alex Torres (4–0)	**José Mijares** (0–3)	Fernando Rodney (27)	34,078	49–61
111	August 5	Brewers	4–2	**Santiago Casilla** (5–2)	John Axford (5–5)	**Sergio Romo** (27)	42,217	50–61
112	August 6	Brewers	1–3	Wily Peralta (8–11)	**Matt Cain** (7–7)	Jim Henderson (16)	41,426	50–62
113	August 7	Brewers	1–6	Alfredo Fígaro (2–3)	**Madison Bumgarner** (11–7)		41,416	50–63
114	August 8	Brewers	4–1	**Tim Lincecum** (6–11)	Donovan Hand (0–4)		41,219	51–63
115	August 9	Orioles	2–5 (10)	Jim Johnson (3–7)	**Javier López** (1–2)	Tommy Hunter (3)	41,434	51–64
116	August 10	Orioles	3–2	**Guillermo Moscoso** (1–0)	Wei-Yin Chen (6–5)	**Sergio Romo** (28)	41,315	52–64
117	August 11	Orioles	2–10	Troy Patton (2–0)	**Matt Cain** (7–8)		41,622	52–65
118	August 13	@ Nationals	2–4	Tanner Roark (1–0)	**Guillermo Moscoso** (1–1)	Rafael Soriano (30)	27,304	52–66
119	August 14	@ Nationals	5–6	Jordan Zimmermann (14–6)	**Tim Lincecum** (6–12)	Rafael Soriano (31)	30,657	52–67
120	August 15	@ Nationals	4–3	**Javier López** (2–2)	Rafael Soriano (2–3)	**Sergio Romo** (29)	36,719	53–67
121	August 16	@ Marlins	14–10	**Sandy Rosario** (3–0)	Nate Eovaldi (2–3)		26,166	54–67
122	August 17	@ Marlins	6–4	**Matt Cain** (8–8)	Henderson Álvarez (2–2)	**Sergio Romo** (30)	24,653	55–67
123	August 18	@ Marlins	5–6	Chad Qualls (4–1)	**Sandy Rosario** (3–1)	Steve Cishek (27)	23,113	55–68
124	August 19	Red Sox	0–7	Jon Lester (11–7)	**Tim Lincecum** (6–13)		41,585	55–69
125	August 20	Red Sox	3–2	**Sergio Romo** (4–6)	Franklin Morales (2–1)		41,551	56–69
126	August 21	Red Sox	1–12	Félix Doubront (9–6)	**Barry Zito** (4–9)		41,532	56–70
127	August 22	Pirates	5–10	Jeanmar Gómez (3–0)	**Guillermo Moscoso** (1–2)		41,733	56–71
128	August 23	Pirates	1–3	Charlie Morton (5–3)	**Madison Bumgarner** (11–8)	Mark Melancon (9)	41,583	56–72
129	August 24	Pirates	6–3	**Tim Lincecum** (7–13)	Francisco Liriano (14–6)	**Sergio Romo** (31)	42,059	57–72
130	August 25	Pirates	4–0	**Ryan Vogelsong** (3–4)	A. J. Burnett (6–9)		41,815	58–72
131	August 26	@ Rockies	1–6	Juan Nicasio (8–6)	**Barry Zito** (4–10)		30,364	58–73
132	August 27	@ Rockies	5–3	**Yusmeiro Petit** (1–0)	Chad Bettis (0–3)	**Sergio Romo** (32)	26,601	59–73
133	August 28	@ Rockies	4–5	Jhoulys Chacín (13–7)	**Madison Bumgarner** (11–9)	Rex Brothers (14)	27,268	59–74
134	August 30	@ Diamondbacks	1–0	**Tim Lincecum** (8–13)	Randall Delgado (4–5)	**Sergio Romo** (33)	24,380	60–74
135	August 31	@ Diamondbacks	3–4	Brad Ziegler (8–1)	**Sandy Rosario** (3–2)		36,091	60–75

September (16–11)

#	Date	Opponent	Score	Win	Loss	Save	Attendance	Record
136	September 1	@ Diamondbacks	8–2	**Yusmeiro Petit** (2–0)	Patrick Corbin (13–5)		33,422	61–75
137	September 2	@ Padres	1–4	Ian Kennedy (6–9)	**Barry Zito** (4–11)	Huston Street (26)	25,430	61–76
138	September 3	@ Padres	2–3	Tim Stauffer (3–1)	**Jake Dunning** (0–2)	Huston Street (27)	19,889	61–77
139	September 4	@ Padres	13–5	**Tim Lincecum** (9–13)	Eric Stults (8–13)		15,762	62–77
140	September 5	Diamondbacks	2–4	Trevor Cahill (6–10)	**Ryan Vogelsong** (3–5)	Brad Ziegler (8)	41,193	62–78
141	September 6	Diamondbacks	3–0	**Yusmeiro Petit** (3–0)	Patrick Corbin (13–6)		41,180	63–78
142	September 7	Diamondbacks	1–2	Brandon McCarthy (4–9)	**Matt Cain** (8–9)	Brad Ziegler (9)	41,076	63–79
143	September 8	Diamondbacks	3–2 (11)	**Javier López** (3–2)	Joe Thatcher (3–2)		41,050	64–79
144	September 9	Rockies	3–2 (10)	**Santiago Casilla** (6–2)	Adam Ottavino (1–3)		41,078	65–79
145	September 10	Rockies	8–9	Wilton López (3–4)	**Sergio Romo** (4–7)	Rex Brothers (16)	41,171	65–80
146	September 11	Rockies	4–3	**Guillermo Moscoso** (2–2)	Matt Belisle (5–7)	**Santiago Casilla** (2)	41,128	66–80
147	September 12	@ Dodgers	2–3 (10)	Brian Wilson (2–1)	**Jeremy Affeldt** (1–5)		53,393	66–81
148	September 13	@ Dodgers	4–2	**Madison Bumgarner** (12–9)	Clayton Kershaw (14–9)	**Sergio Romo** (34)	52,650	67–81
149	September 14	@ Dodgers	19–3	**Tim Lincecum** (10–13)	Ricky Nolasco (13–10)		53,062	68–81
150	September 15	@ Dodgers	4–3	**Jean Machi** (3–1)	Paco Rodriguez (3–3)	**Sergio Romo** (35)	47,302	69–81
151	September 17	@ Mets	8–5	**Yusmeiro Petit** (4–0)	Sean Henn (0–1)		24,343	70–81
152	September 18	@ Mets	4–5	Vic Black (2–0)	**Sergio Romo** (4–8)		23,698	70–82
153	September 19	@ Mets	2–1	**Madison Bumgarner** (13–9)	Jon Niese (7–8)	**Javier López** (1)	22,897	71–82
154	September 20	@ Yankees	1–5	CC Sabathia (14–13)	**Tim Lincecum** (10–14)		41,734	71–83
155	September 21	@ Yankees	0–6	Iván Nova (9–5)	**Ryan Vogelsong** (3–6)		42,420	71–84
156	September 22	@ Yankees	2–1	**Javier López** (4–2)	Andy Pettitte (10–11)	**Sergio Romo** (36)	49,197	72–84
157	September 24	Dodgers	1–2	Hyun-Jin Ryu (14–7)	**Matt Cain** (8–10)	Kenley Jansen (28)	41,625	72–85
158	September 25	Dodgers	6–4	**Barry Zito** (5–11)	Ricky Nolasco (13–11)	**Sergio Romo** (37)	41,377	73–85
159	September 26	Dodgers	3–2	**Santiago Casilla** (7–2)	Paco Rodriguez (3–4)	**Sergio Romo** (38)	41,221	74–85
160	September 27	Padres	7–3	**Ryan Vogelsong** (4–6)	Burch Smith (1–3)		41,103	75–85
161	September 28	Padres	3–9	Eric Stults (11–13)	**Yusmeiro Petit** (4–1)		41,201	75–86
162	September 29	Padres	7–6	**Sergio Romo** (5–8)	Huston Street (2–5)		41,495	76–86

== Roster ==
2013 San Francisco Giants
Roster
Pitchers: 41 Jeremy Affeldt; 40 Madison Bumgarner; 18 Matt Cain; 46 Santiago Casilla; 51 Jake Dunning; 57 Chad Gaudin; 38 Heath Hembree; 59 Mike Kickham; 70 George Kontos; 55 Tim Lincecum; 49 Javier López; 63 Jean Machi; 50 José Mijares; 34 Guillermo Moscoso; 52 Yusmeiro Petit; 52 Ramón Ramírez; 54 Sergio Romo; 43 Sandy Rosario; 47 Eric Surkamp; 32 Ryan Vogelsong; 75 Barry Zito	Catchers: 12 Johnny Monell; 28 Buster Posey; 12 Guillermo Quiróz; 29 Héctor Sánchez; Infielders: 10 Tony Abreu; 53 Ehíré Adríanza; 13 Joaquín Árias; 9 Brandon Belt; 35 Brandon Crawford; 21 Nick Noonan; 6 Brett Pill; 48 Pablo Sandoval; 19 Marco Scutaro	Outfielders: 7 Gregor Blanco; 23 Jeff Francoeur; 22 Cole Gillespie; 22 Roger Kieschnick; 16 Ángel Pagán; 14 Francisco Peguero; 8 Hunter Pence; 2 Juan Pérez; 37 Kensuke Tanaka; 56 Andrés Torres	Manager: 15 Bruce Bochy; Coaches: 1 Tim Flannery (third base); 26 Mark Gardner (bullpen); 58 Bill Hayes (bullpen catcher); 39 Roberto Kelly (first base); 5 Joe Lefebvre (assistant hitting); 31 Hensley Meulens (hitting); 33 Dave Righetti (pitching); 17 Ron Wotus (bench)

== Batting ==
Stats in bold are team leaders. Individual pitchers batting are not included in the list.

Note: G = Games played; AB = At bats; R = Runs scored; H = Hits; 2B = Doubles; 3B = Triples; HR = Home runs; RBI = Runs batted in; AVG = Batting average; OBP = On-base percentage; SLG = Slugging percentage; OPS = On-base + Slugging percentage SB = Stolen bases

Player	G	AB	R	H	2B	3B	HR	RBI	AVG	OBP	SLG	OPS	SB
Hunter Pence	**162**	**629**	**91**	**178**	35	5	**27**	**99**	.283	.339	**.483**	.822	**22**
Pablo Sandoval	141	525	52	146	27	2	14	79	.278	.341	.417	.758	0
Buster Posey	148	520	61	153	34	1	15	72	.294	**.371**	.450	.821	2
Brandon Belt	150	509	76	147	**39**	4	17	67	.289	.360	.481	**.841**	5
Brandon Crawford	149	499	52	124	24	3	9	43	.248	.311	.363	.674	1
Marco Scutaro	127	488	57	145	23	3	2	31	**.297**	.357	.369	.726	2
Gregor Blanco	141	452	50	120	17	**6**	3	41	.265	.341	.350	.690	14
Ángel Pagán	71	280	44	79	16	3	5	30	.282	.334	.414	.749	9
Andrés Torres	103	272	33	68	17	1	2	21	.250	.302	.342	.644	4
Joaquín Árias	102	225	17	61	9	2	1	19	.271	.284	.342	.627	1
Tony Abreu	53	138	21	37	12	3	2	14	.268	.301	.442	.743	0
Héctor Sánchez	63	129	8	32	4	0	3	19	.248	.300	.349	.649	0
Nick Noonan	62	105	12	23	2	0	0	5	.219	.261	.238	.499	0
Juan Pérez	34	89	8	23	5	0	1	8	.258	.302	.348	.650	2
Guillermo Quiróz	43	86	5	16	7	0	1	6	.186	.237	.302	.539	0
Brett Pill	43	85	11	19	4	0	3	12	.224	.272	.376	.648	0
Roger Kieschnick	38	64	6	17	0	1	0	5	.202	.295	.226	.521	0
Jeff Francoeur	22	62	1	12	2	0	0	4	.194	.206	.226	.432	1
Kensuke Tanaka	15	30	4	8	0	0	0	2	.267	.353	.267	.620	2
Francisco Peguero	18	29	4	6	1	0	1	1	.207	.233	.345	.578	2
Ehíré Adríanza	9	18	3	4	1	0	1	3	.222	.263	.444	.708	0
Cole Gillespie	3	9	0	0	0	0	0	0	.000	.100	.000	.100	0
Johnny Monell	8	8	2	1	0	0	0	1	.125	.222	.125	.347	0
Pitcher totals	162	281	11	27	1	1	0	14	.096	.144	.107	.251	0
**Team totals**	**162**	**5552**	**629**	**1446**	**280**	**35**	**107**	**596**	**.260**	**.320**	**.381**	**.702**	**67**

== Pitching ==
Note: W = Wins; L = Losses; ERA = Earned run average; G = Games pitched; GS = Games started; SV = Saves; IP = Innings pitched; H = Hits allowed; ER = Earned runs allowed; HR = Home runs allowed; BB = Walks allowed; K = Strikeouts

Player	W	L	ERA	G	GS	SV	IP	H	ER	HR	BB	K
Madison Bumgarner	13	9	2.77	31	31	0	201.1	146	62	15	62	199
Tim Lincecum	10	14	4.37	32	32	0	197.2	184	96	21	76	193
Matt Cain	8	10	4.00	30	30	0	184.1	158	82	23	55	158
Barry Zito	5	11	5.74	30	25	0	133.1	173	85	19	54	86
Ryan Vogelsong	4	6	5.73	19	19	0	103.2	124	66	15	38	67
Chad Gaudin	5	2	3.06	30	12	0	97.0	81	33	6	40	88
Sergio Romo	5	8	2.54	65	0	38	60.1	53	17	5	12	58
George Kontos	2	2	4.39	52	0	0	55.1	60	27	7	18	47
Jean Machi	3	1	2.38	51	0	0	53.0	46	14	2	12	51
Santiago Casilla	7	2	2.16	57	0	2	50.0	39	12	2	25	38
José Mijares	0	3	4.22	60	0	0	49.0	67	23	3	20	54
Yusmeiro Petit	4	1	3.56	8	7	0	48.0	46	19	4	11	47
Sandy Rosario	3	2	3.02	43	0	0	41.2	38	14	1	20	24
Javier López	4	2	1.83	69	0	1	39.1	30	8	1	12	37
Jeremy Affeldt	1	5	3.74	39	0	0	33.2	27	14	2	17	21
Guillermo Moscoso	2	2	5.10	13	2	0	30.0	20	17	5	21	31
Michael Kickham	0	3	10.16	12	3	0	28.1	46	32	8	10	29
Jake Dunning	0	2	2.84	29	0	0	25.1	20	8	2	11	16
Heath Hembree	0	0	0.00	9	0	0	7.2	4	0	0	2	12
Ramón Ramírez	0	0	11.12	6	0	0	5.2	9	7	2	5	0
Eric Surkamp	0	1	23.63	1	1	0	2.2	9	7	2	0	0
Team totals	76	86	4.00	162	162	41	1447.1	1380	643	145	521	1256

== Farm system ==
Level	Team	League	Manager
AAA	Fresno Grizzlies	Pacific Coast League	Bob Mariano
AA	Richmond Flying Squirrels	Eastern League	Dave Machemer
A	San Jose Giants	California League	Andy Skeels
A	Augusta GreenJackets	South Atlantic League	Mike Goff
A-Short Season	Salem-Keizer Volcanoes	Northwest League	Gary Davenport
Rookie	AZL Giants	Arizona League	Derin McMains and Nestor Rojas

LEAGUE CHAMPIONS: AZL Giants
