= Dream House for Medically Fragile Children =

American non-profit organization

Dream House For Medically Fragile Children
- Type: Private
- Founded: 2001
- Founder: Laura O. Moore
- Headquarters: Lilburn, Georgia, United States
- Website: www.dreamhouseforkids.org

Dream House For Medically Fragile Children was a Georgia-based organization dedicated to providing financial support and homes to children with severe health issues. It is a tax-exempt 501(c)(3) charitable nonprofit. The organization was founded by Laura O. Moore, a pediatric nurse. The organization eventually served "children [who] had been abandoned by their families because they didn't have the means to properly care for the child. In other instances, the child had been taken from the parents or caregivers because of abuse or neglect." Children could stabilize and improve with good care, and then returning them to their families, placing them in foster homes and/or obtaining adoption would be possible.

== History ==
In the fall of 2001, Laura O. Moore founded the organization as The Dream House for Kids, a non-profit organization dedicated to moving medically fragile children out of institutions and to educate these children's families, caregivers, and communities about issues that affect them. Moore was trained as a pediatric intensive care nurse.

In December 2002 the organization was renamed the Dream House For Medically Fragile Children.

Laura Moore and her husband took in Katie as a foster child in 2004.

The organization expanded in 2004, hiring a separate Executive Director, allowing the founder to serve in other ways.

=== "Person of the Week" ===
During 2008, ABC News with Charles Gibson regularly ran a segment named "Person of the Week" that highlighted extraordinary persons. ABC News had noticed the story of Laura Moore and the Dream House in People magazine.

Laura Moore as "ABC Person of the Week" became a segment on nationwide news. Gibson called the house an "oasis in rural Georgia ..." (1:15 on). Laura had by then found homes for 12 children.

=== Care and closure ===
The organization ran an actual transitional housing facility in a large house, but it was forced to close the house in 2011 for financial reasons, leading to some of its wards being replaced into state custody. During the course of its existence, the Dream House had about 100 residents.

The organization had served about 1,000 children, of which about 100 had actually lived in the house for some period. Those were the most dire cases, of orphans and those whose families could not adequately handle their care.

The house served as a "live-in transition home for children dependent on equipment, medication or constant nursing care to survive, many of which are orphans or wards of the state" and was "essentially rescuing them from living in the hospital as they awaited a caring foster family."

According to the organization, ninety percent of children served were served via weekend programs training and assisting families, and other non-residential care.

In the financial statements for the year ending June 30, 2014, the board of directors stated that with regret the organization was to close down in August.

== Programs ==
The organization runs three programs: a "Weekend Retreat" respite program that "offers an opportunity where the children can feel at home, while their families can receive a much-needed break from the stress and exhaustion that comes from providing constant, around the clock care", a "Family for Keeps®" education and skills training program that "provides tailored instruction that teaches foster, adoptive and biological families, social work professionals and other caregivers how to provide safe and effective care for medically fragile children at home," and a "Bridging the Gap" program that is intended "to help foster, adoptive and biological families acquire health care supplies, home modifications, and equipment necessary to provide safe and accessible homes for their medically fragile children."

== Development ==
The nonprofit benefited from a 2007 fundraiser headlined by Atlanta Braves baseball player Jeff Francoeur, involving Delta Air Lines' frequent flyer program, SkyMiles, donating the value of 25,000 Skymiles for each homerun hit by Francoeur during the season.

In 2007, Moore was named a Volvo For Life Award category winner, garnering a $50,000 donation by Volvo to the charity.

In 2007, Moore was named Gwinnett Magazine's Woman of the Year.

In 2008, for her work in the nonprofit, founder Moore was named a finalist in the Health-Care Innovation section of the 2008 Atlanta Business Chronicle's "Health-Care Heroes Awards".

By 2008, the organization had 18 staff, had raised more than $3 million, and had served 900 children throughout Georgia.

Laura Moore was covered in People and named ABC Person of the Week on the ABC News program in 2008.

Its required filing for 2012 shows that the organization achieved revenues over one million dollars in 2010–2011, and had assets of $585,000 and net assets of 210,000 as of June 30, 2012. The report also states that the program would in the future change its program goal towards its weekend program.

The organization was to hold an inaugural Valentine's dinner and dance as a fundraiser in Duluth, Georgia, a suburb of Atlanta, on February 8, 2014.

== Laura O. Moore ==
Laura O. Moore grew up in Texas and Georgia. She attended Auburn University and then became a nurse in Atlanta. She was married in 1984. She worked as a pediatric nurse for 23 years. She founded the Dream House charity in 2001.
