= Jake Dunning =

American baseball player (born 1988)

- Pitcher
- Born: August 12, 1988 (age 37); Fort Stewart, Georgia, U.S.
- Batted: Right Threw: Right

MLB debut
- June 16, 2013, for the San Francisco Giants

Last MLB appearance
- May 5, 2014, for the San Francisco Giants

MLB statistics
- Win–loss record: 0–2
- Earned run average: 2.77
- Strikeouts: 16
- Stats at Baseball Reference

Teams
- San Francisco Giants (2013–2014)

Jake Austin Dunning (born August 12, 1988) is an American former professional baseball pitcher. He played in Major League Baseball (MLB) for the San Francisco Giants. He is the older brother of Dane Dunning.

== Career ==
=== Amateur ===
Dunning attended Indiana University, where he played college baseball for the Indiana Hoosiers baseball team. In 2009, he played collegiate summer baseball with the Hyannis Mets of the Cape Cod Baseball League.

=== San Francisco Giants ===
The San Francisco Giants drafted Dunning in the 33rd round, with the 987th overall selection, of the 2009 Major League Baseball draft. On November 20, 2012, the Giants added Dunning to their 40-man roster to protect him from the Rule 5 draft. He was promoted to the major leagues for the first time on June 14, 2013. Dunning made his MLB debut on June 16, against the Atlanta Braves. He dedicated his first major league performance to his parents, John and Misu Dunning.

Dunning is the only MLB pitcher to give up two grand slams at Oracle Park (known as AT&T Park at the time), both of them coming during the 2013 season. They were the only two home runs hit against him during his 30-game major league career.

On May 5, 2014, Dunning allowed runners to score on two consecutive wild pitches in a game against the Pittsburgh Pirates, his only appearance of the year. He was designated for assignment by the Giants on June 21, and sent outright to the Triple–A Fresno Grizzlies on June 28.

Dunning spent the 2016 campaign with the Triple–A Sacramento River Cats, recording a 4.85 ERA with 43 strikeouts across 59 1/3 innings pitched. He elected free agency following the season on November 7, 2016.

=== Chicago White Sox ===
On February 25, 2017, Dunning signed a minor league contract with the Chicago White Sox. He made 14 appearances (one start) split between the Double-A Birmingham Barons and Triple-A Charlotte Knights, but struggled to an 8.39 ERA and 2-1 record with 23 strikeouts across 24 2/3 innings pitched. Dunning was released by the White Sox organization on June 28.

=== Long Island Ducks ===
On July 14, 2017, Dunning signed with the Long Island Ducks of the Atlantic League of Professional Baseball. In 14 appearances (seven starts), he posted a 2-3 record and 3.65 ERA with 43 strikeouts across 49 1/3 innings pitched.

Dunning made 19 appearances (four starts) for Long Island in 2018, but struggled to a 1-3 record and 7.96 ERA with 19 strikeouts across 31 2/3 innings of work. Dunning announced his retirement on July 12, 2018.

== See also ==
- Lists of Major League Baseball players
