= Héctor Olivera (baseball) =

Cuban baseball player (born 1985)

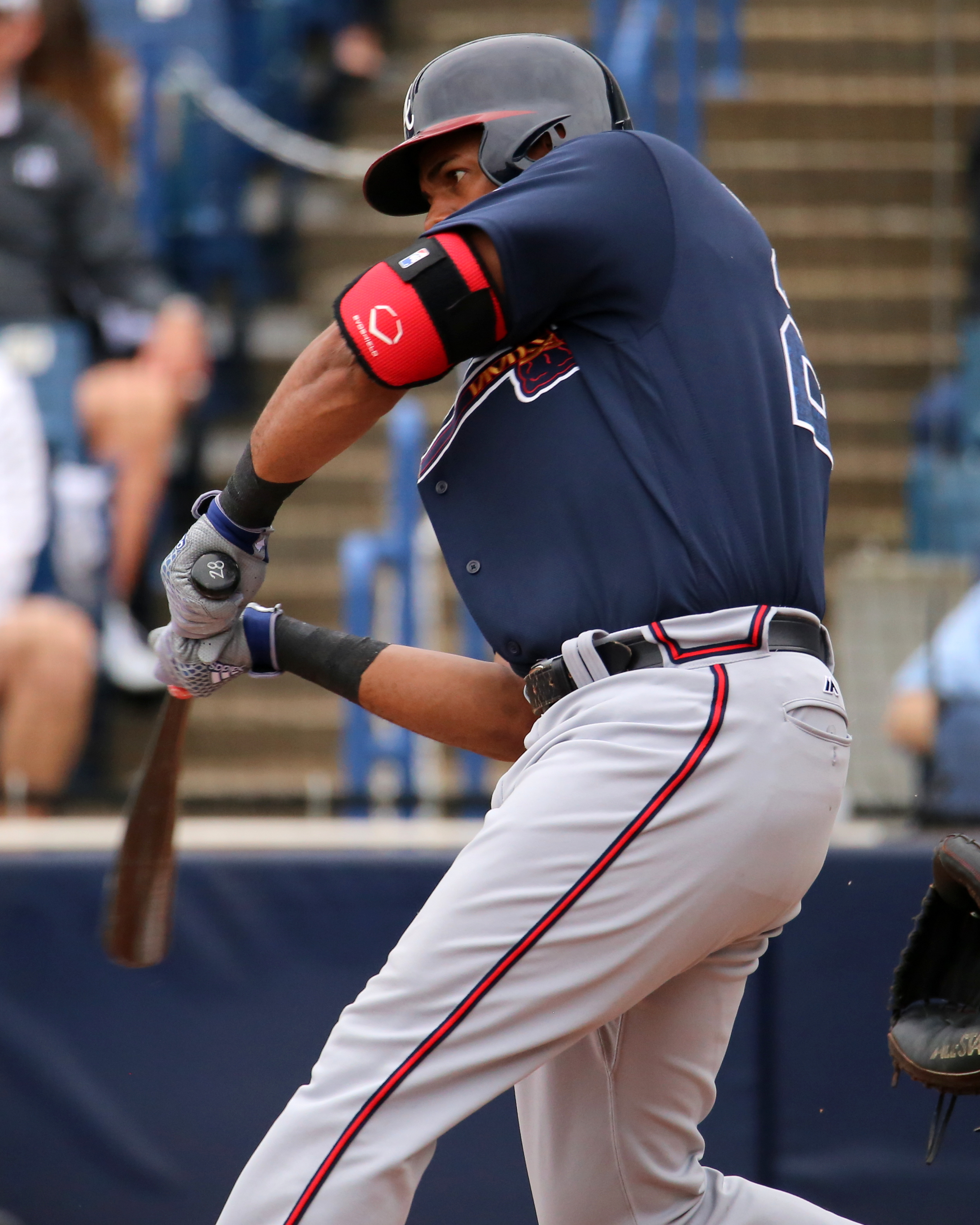
- Olivera with the Atlanta Braves
- Third baseman / Outfielder
- Born: April 5, 1985 (age 41); Santiago de Cuba, Cuba
- Batted: Right Threw: Right

MLB debut
- September 1, 2015, for the Atlanta Braves

Last MLB appearance
- April 11, 2016, for the Atlanta Braves

MLB statistics
- Batting average: .245
- Home runs: 2
- Runs batted in: 13
- Stats at Baseball Reference

Teams
- Atlanta Braves (2015–2016)
Medals
Men's baseball
Representing Cuba
Summer Olympics
Silver medal – second place	2008 Beijing	National team
Baseball World Cup
Silver medal – second place	2007 Taipei	National team
Silver medal – second place	2009 Nettuno	National team
Intercontinental Cup
Gold medal – first place	2010 Taichung	National team
Pan American Games
Bronze medal – third place	2011 Guadalajara	National team

Héctor Olivera Amaro (born April 5, 1985) is a Cuban former professional baseball left fielder. He was part of the Cuban team that won a silver medal at the 2008 Summer Olympics. He has played in Major League Baseball (MLB) for the Atlanta Braves.

== Career ==
=== Cuban career ===
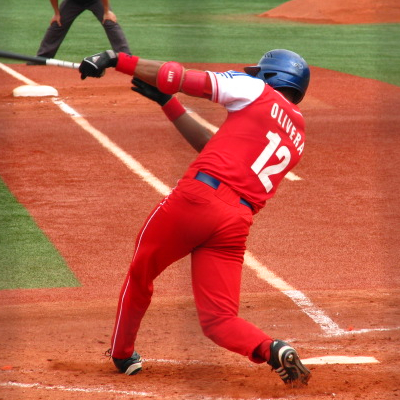
Olivera batting for the Cuba national team in 2010 World University Baseball Championship

Olivera played for the Santiago de Cuba team in the Cuban National Series from 2003 through 2014 and hit .323 with 96 home runs and 433 runs batted in for them. He missed the entire 2012–13 season due to a blood disorder, which also limited him defensively during the 2013–14 season.

In addition, he played for the Cuba national baseball team at the 2008 Beijing Olympics, 2007 and 2009 Baseball World Cups, the 2010 Intercontinental Cup, the 2011 Pan American Games and the 2009 World Baseball Classic.

=== Defection from Cuba ===
Olivera defected from Cuba in September 2014 to pursue a career in Major League Baseball, establishing his residence in Haiti. His potential drew many scouts to his showcase in the Dominican Republic, where he was said to be in good physical condition with a quick bat and above-average power.

=== Los Angeles Dodgers ===
On March 24, 2015, he agreed to sign with the Los Angeles Dodgers for six years and $62.5 million, including a $28 million signing bonus. His contract also reportedly included a clause that would allow the Dodgers to add on a seventh year for $1 million if Olivera required Tommy John surgery. This clause was the result of several MRIs that showed Olivera had a minor UCL tear.

Olivera worked out at the Dodgers training facility in the Dominican Republic while waiting for his visa to travel to the United States to be approved, which finally happened on May 11, 2015. He passed his physical on May 19 and officially signed his contract. The physical also revealed that, contrary to previous reports, he did not need elbow surgery. The team announced that Olivera would spend several weeks at their spring training facility in Arizona before joining a minor league team. On June 3, he was assigned to the Double-A Tulsa Drillers of the Texas League to begin his professional baseball career. He made his debut with the Drillers the next day and had one hit in four at-bats with two walks in a game against the Midland RockHounds. This was his first game action since the 2013-14 Cuban season and manager Razor Shines said, "For a guy that hasn't played in that long, his at-bats were really good." In six games for the Drillers, Olivera batted .318 and hit a grand slam. He was promoted to the Triple-A Oklahoma City Dodgers on June 12. His advancement was hampered by a hamstring injury on June 20.

=== Atlanta Braves ===
On July 30, 2015, in a three-team trade, the Atlanta Braves acquired Olivera, Paco Rodriguez, minor-league pitcher Zachary Bird and a competitive balance draft pick for the 2016 MLB draft, while the Dodgers acquired Mat Latos, Michael Morse, Bronson Arroyo, Alex Wood, Jim Johnson, Luis Avilán and José Peraza, and the Miami Marlins acquired minor-league pitchers Victor Araujo, Jeff Brigham and Kevin Guzman. He was called up to the majors for the first time on September 1, 2015. Six days later, Olivera hit his first major league home run in a game against the Philadelphia Phillies. In the off-season, Olivera played in the Liga de Béisbol Profesional Roberto Clemente based in Puerto Rico, where he began a transition to left field. The Braves continued starting Olivera in left field during spring training.

On April 13, 2016, Olivera was arrested outside Washington, D.C., after a domestic dispute. Although convicted of misdemeanor assault and battery and sentenced to a 90-day prison term, he was released after serving 10 days. He was subsequently placed on the MLB restricted list, and in his absence, the Braves recalled Daniel Castro from Triple-A Gwinnett as an infielder replacement.

On May 26, 2016, Olivera was ultimately suspended for 82 games without pay for violating MLB's off-the-field personal conduct policy that consists of domestic violence and other known violations, meaning that Olivera would not be eligible to play until August 1. The suspension applied retroactively on April 30, and Olivera decided not to appeal it.

=== San Diego Padres ===
On July 30, 2016, the Braves traded Olivera to the San Diego Padres in exchange for Matt Kemp and cash considerations. Upon the completion of his MLB suspension, the Padres designated Olivera for assignment on August 2. On August 9, 2016, Olivera was released.

=== Sugar Land Skeeters ===
On May 30, 2017, Olivera signed with the Sugar Land Skeeters of the Atlantic League of Professional Baseball. On November 1, 2017, he became a free agent and retired from professional baseball at age 32. In 45 games he hit .289/.322/.376 with 2 home runs and 15 RBIs.

== See also ==
- List of baseball players who defected from Cuba
