= Joaquín Arias (baseball) =

Dominican baseball player (born 1984)

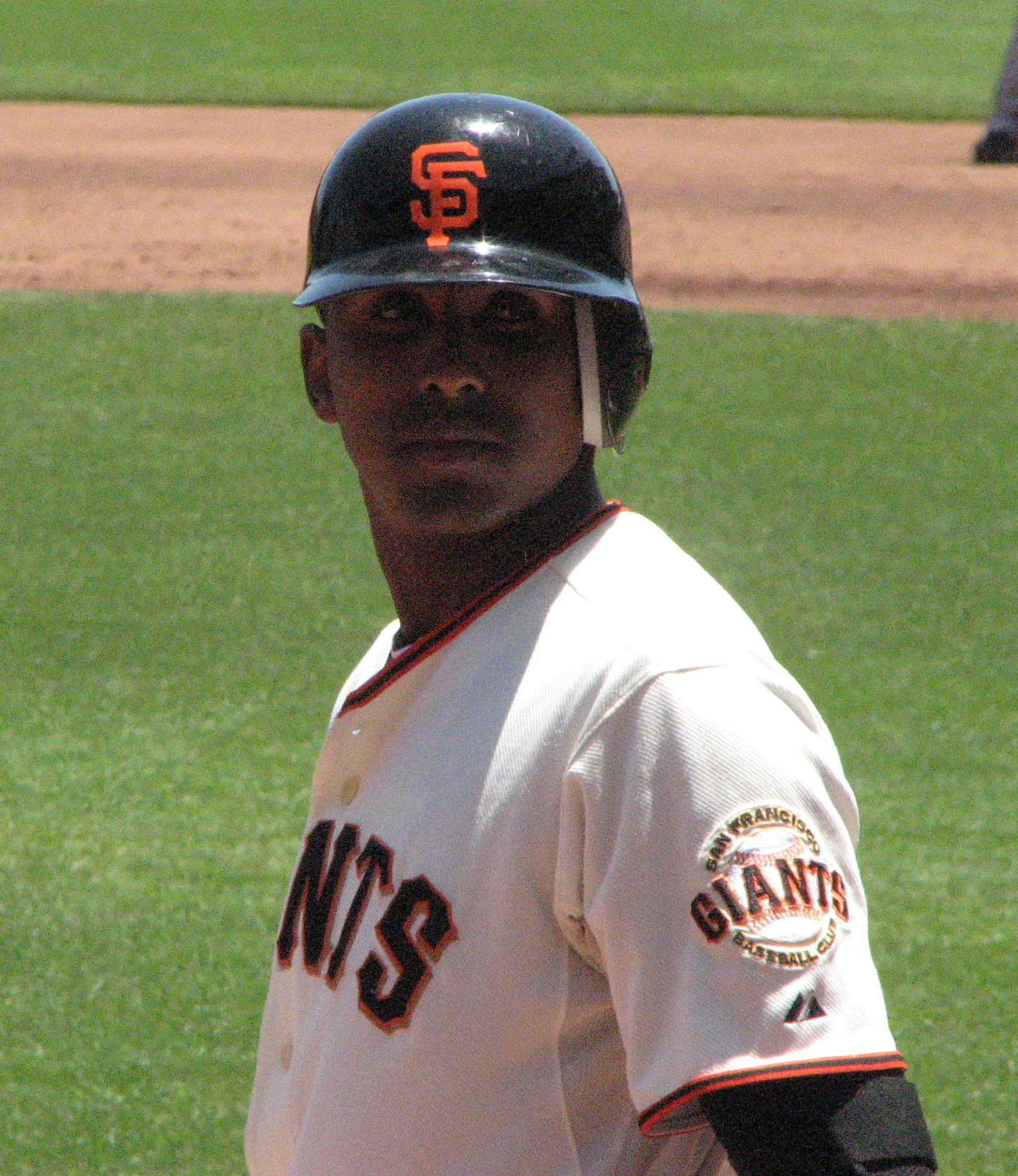
- Árias with the San Francisco Giants
- Infielder
- Born: September 21, 1984 (age 41); Santo Domingo, Dominican Republic
- Batted: Right Threw: Right

MLB debut
- September 13, 2006, for the Texas Rangers

Last MLB appearance
- July 24, 2015, for the San Francisco Giants

MLB statistics
- Batting average: .265
- Home runs: 7
- Runs batted in: 95
- Stats at Baseball Reference

Teams
- Texas Rangers (2006, 2008–2010); New York Mets (2010); San Francisco Giants (2012–2015)

Career highlights and awards
- 2× World Series champion (2012, 2014)

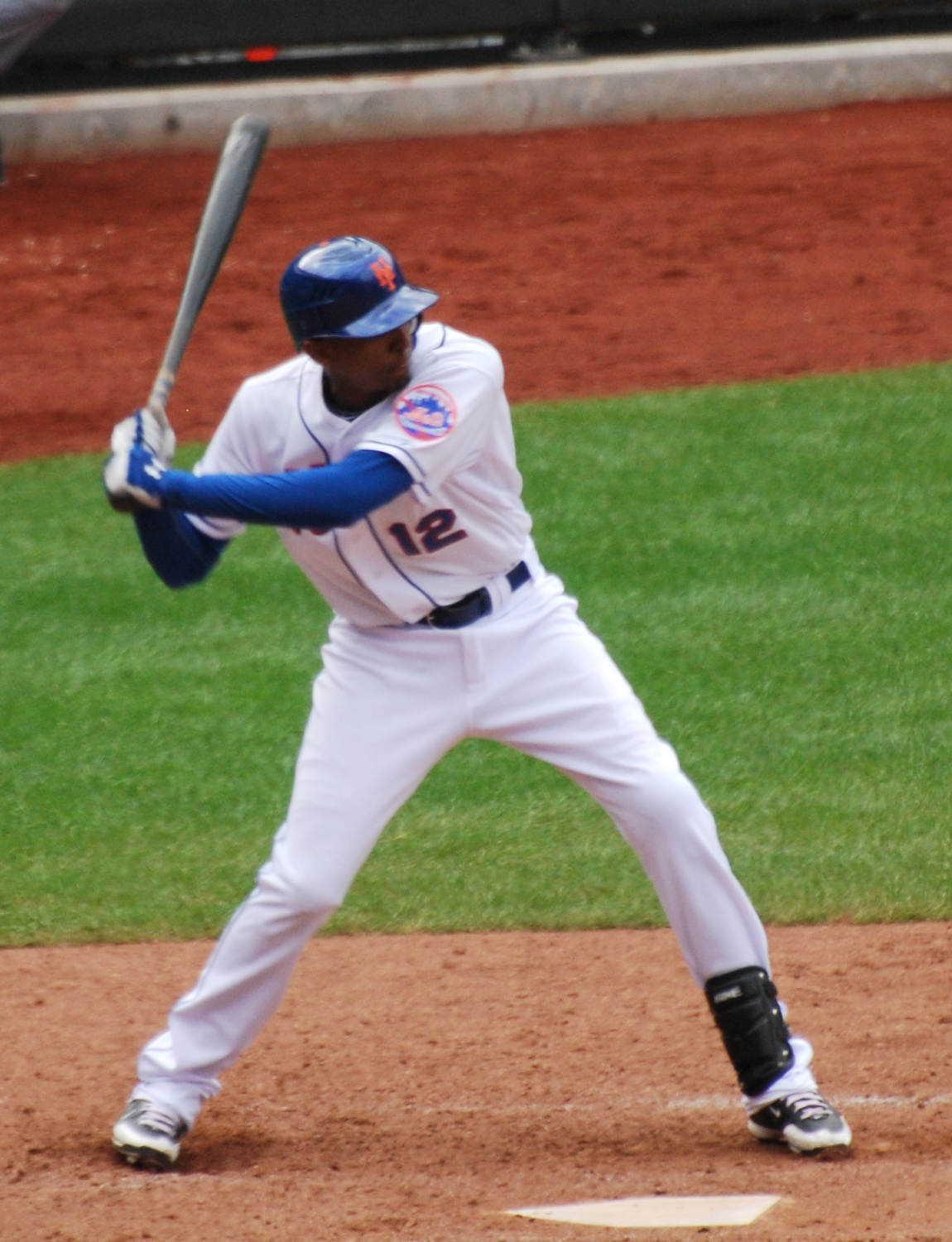
Arias batting for the New York Mets in 2010.

Joaquín Arias (born September 21, 1984) is a Dominican former professional baseball infielder. He played in Major League Baseball (MLB) for the Texas Rangers, New York Mets, and San Francisco Giants.

== Early life ==
Arias was born on 21 September 1984, in Santo Domingo, Dominican Republic.

== Professional career ==
=== New York Yankees ===
Arias signed with the New York Yankees as an international free agent on 12 July 2001. He made his professional debut in 2002 with the rookie-level Gulf Coast League Yankees, hitting .300 with 21 RBI across 57 games. Arias batted .266/.306/.343 with three home runs, 48 RBI, and 12 stolen bases for the Battle Creek Yankees of the Single-A Midwest League in 2003.

=== Texas Rangers ===
The Texas Rangers acquired Arias on 23 March 2004, completing a trade made 36 days earlier on 16 February that sent Alex Rodriguez to the New York Yankees for Alfonso Soriano. Among five Yankees prospects offered to the Rangers, Arias was selected over Robinson Canó because he was a more polished defender and two years younger.

==== Major leagues ====
Arias made his Major League debut with the Rangers on 13 September 2006, drawing a walk against the Detroit Tigers. He made six appearances for Texas during his rookie campaign, going 6-for-11 (.545) with one RBI and one walk.

Arias missed the majority of the 2007 campaign after undergoing arthroscopic right shoulder surgery. He made 32 appearances for the Rangers during the 2008 season, batting .291/.345/.409 with nine RBI and four stolen bases. Arias played in only three games for Texas in 2009, going hitless in eight at-bats.

Arias made 50 appearances for the Rangers in 2010, slashing .276/.290/.347 with nine RBI and one stolen base. Arias was designated for assignment following the promotion of Alex Cora on 24 August 2010

=== New York Mets ===
On 31 August 2010, Arias was traded to the New York Mets in exchange for Jeff Francoeur. Arias made 22 appearances down the stretch for New York, hitting .200/.250/.233 with four RBI.

=== Kansas City Royals ===
On 4 November 2010, Arias was claimed off waivers by the Kansas City Royals, but the Royals designated Arias for assignment on 19 December to make room on the 40-man roster for the prospects acquired in the Zack Greinke trade. He cleared waivers and was sent outright to the Triple-A Omaha Storm Chasers on 22 December. Arias played in 69 games for Omaha in 2011, hitting .232/.272/.353 with three home runs, 25 RBI, and seven stolen bases.

=== San Francisco Giants ===
The San Francisco Giants signed Arias to a minor league contract on 15 December 2011. After spending the 2012 Spring training with the Giants, he was assigned to Fresno Grizzlies, Giants' Triple-A affiliate, on 5 April. He played 18 games for the Grizzlies, hitting .400 with 2 home runs and 17 runs batted in (RBIs). The Giants called up Arias on 25 April.

==== 2012 ====
Arias hit his first major-league home run in his 331st career major-league at-bat on 22 May 2012. The two-run homer off Milwaukee Brewers starting pitcher Shaun Marcum gave San Francisco a 4–0 lead in the 4th inning of a game the Giants would go on to win by a score of 6–4. On 13 June 2012, playing third base, Arias fielded a tricky grounder by Jason Castro, who was pinch-hitting for Xavier Cedeño. Arias, stumbling backwards as he gloved the ball, quickly threw the baseball to first base for the final out of Matt Cain's perfect game. On 22 August 2012, he accumulated a single-game career high of five RBIs. In total, Arias appeared in 112 games of the 2012 regular season, batting .270 with 5 home runs and 34 RBI. He was also hit by pitches a team-high 5 times.

The Giants finished the 2012 season as World Series Champions. During the postseason Arias appeared in 12 games, all of them as a mid- to late-inning replacement. On 10 October, during the Division Series against the Cincinnati Reds, Arias entered the game in the fourth inning and had two hits in three times at bat. Both hits were doubles, after both of which Arias eventually scored runs in a game the Giants won 8–3. Overall for the postseason, Arias went 3-for-8 (.375) with three runs scored.

==== 2013 ====
On 24 June 2013, Arias left a game against the Los Angeles Dodgers in the second inning with a left hamstring injury after scoring from first base on a double by Andrés Torres. The injury only sidelined Arias for a little over a week and he took the field for the Giants against the Cincinnati Reds on 3 July. However, his return proved to be short-lived when he required an emergency appendectomy late on the night of 7 July. The following day the Giants placed him on the 15-day disabled list. He was re-activated and returned to the team on 26 July. Arias started 47 games, appeared in 102 games, batting .271 with 19 RBI.

==== 2014 ====
On 23 January 2014, Arias and the Giants agreed on a two-year, $2.6-million contract. Arias appeared in 107 games, batting .254 with 15 RBI. In the 2014 postseason, Arias appeared in 8 games, batting 2-for-4 with one RBI and two runs scored, as the Giants won the 2014 World Series over the Kansas City Royals.

==== 2015 ====
On 28 April 2015, Arias hit 3-for-3 off Clayton Kershaw, becoming the first Giant get three hits off Kershaw in one game. Arias appeared in 40 games, batting .207, before being designated for assignment on 27 July. Árias cleared waivers and was assigned to the Triple-A Sacramento River Cats on 4 August.

=== Arizona Diamondbacks ===
On 13 December 2015, Arias signed a minor league contract with the Arizona Diamondbacks organization. He was released by Arizona prior to the start of the season on 31 March 2016.
