= Jeff Francoeur =

American baseball player (born 1984)

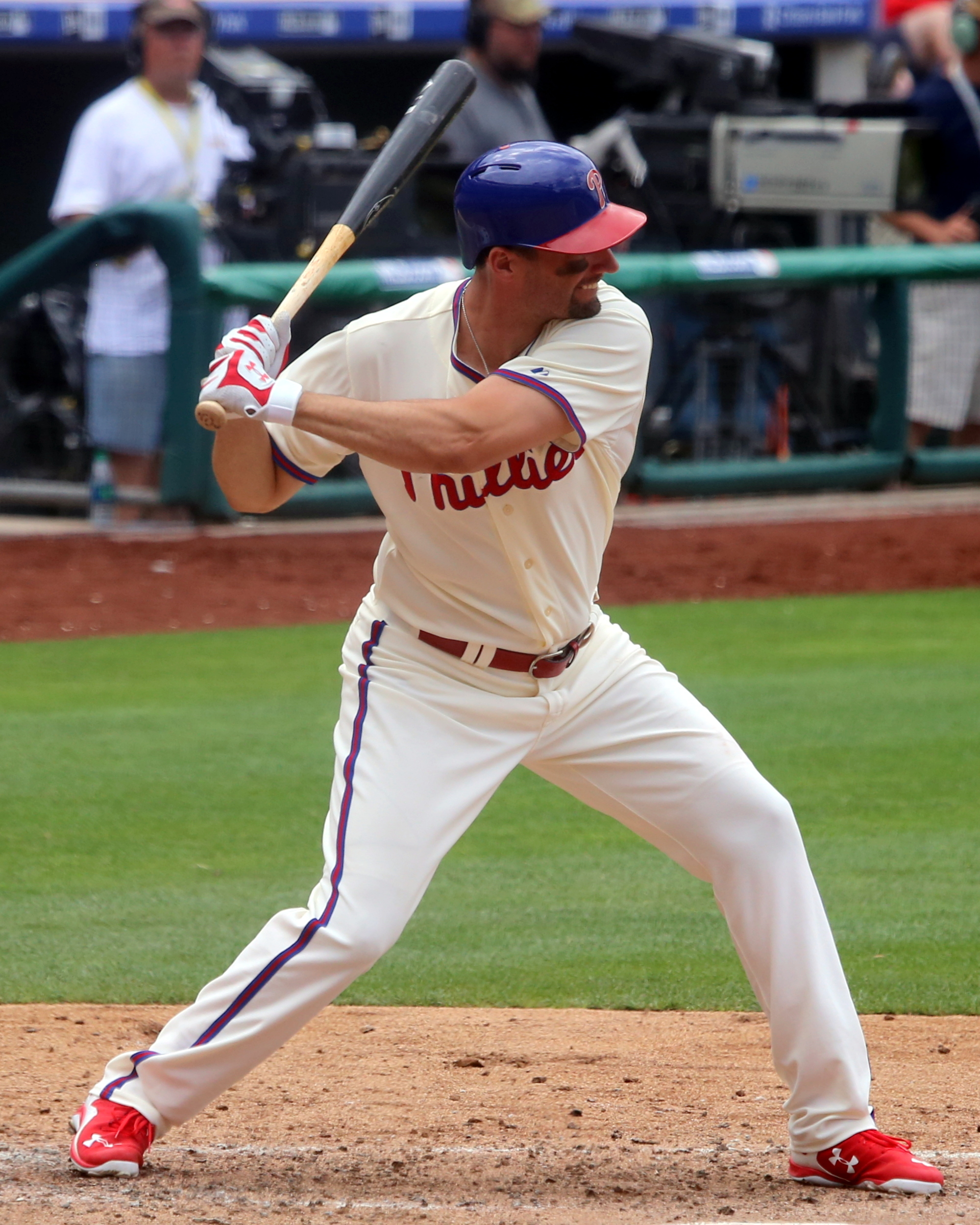
- Francoeur with the Philadelphia Phillies
- Right fielder
- Born: January 8, 1984 (age 42); Atlanta, Georgia, U.S.
- Batted: Right Threw: Right

MLB debut
- July 7, 2005, for the Atlanta Braves

Last MLB appearance
- October 2, 2016, for the Miami Marlins

MLB statistics
- Batting average: .261
- Home runs: 160
- Runs batted in: 698
- Stats at Baseball Reference

Teams
- Atlanta Braves (2005–2009); New York Mets (2009–2010); Texas Rangers (2010); Kansas City Royals (2011–2013); San Francisco Giants (2013); San Diego Padres (2014); Philadelphia Phillies (2015); Atlanta Braves (2016); Miami Marlins (2016)

Career highlights and awards
- Gold Glove Award (2007)

Jeffrey Braden Francoeur (/fræŋˈkʊər/; born January 8, 1984), nicknamed "Frenchy", is an American former professional baseball right fielder, who played in Major League Baseball (MLB) for the Atlanta Braves, New York Mets, Texas Rangers, Kansas City Royals, San Francisco Giants, San Diego Padres, Philadelphia Phillies, and Miami Marlins. When his playing days ended, he became a broadcaster; Francoeur is currently one of the lead television analysts for Atlanta Braves games, as well as doing various work for TBS. He also hosts The Pure Athlete Podcast, a podcast that serves as a resource for coaches, parents, and kids going through the process of youth athletics.

A mid-season call-up for the Braves in 2005, he played in slightly fewer than half of his team's games that year and finished the season with impressive enough statistics to finish third in Rookie of the Year voting and a Sports Illustrated cover story declaring him "The Natural". While he never again had similarly strong statistics, he continued to have a productive career, playing for 11 more seasons as a journeyman outfielder for seven more teams before retiring after a short stint with the Marlins in 2016. Throughout his career, Francoeur was noted for his strong throwing arm in the outfield and his free-swinging tendencies in the batter's box. He won a Gold Glove Award in 2007.

== Early life ==
Francoeur graduated from Parkview High School in Lilburn, Georgia in 2002. He lettered in both baseball and football. He led Parkview to the Georgia 5A high school football championships in 2000 and 2001 as a wide receiver and defensive back. Francoeur was offered a scholarship to play wide receiver for the Clemson Tigers, before turning that down and getting drafted in the first round (23rd overall) of the 2002 MLB draft. He also led Parkview to two state titles in baseball in 2001 and 2002. Francoeur was inducted with the inaugural class of the Georgia High School Football Hall of Fame in October 2022.

== Professional career ==
=== Draft and minor leagues ===
Francoeur was selected by the Braves in the first round of the June 2002 MLB draft. A 4-star defensive back committed to Clemson, he chose to forego college to play baseball. After the draft, Francoeur was assigned to the team's advanced Rookie League club in Danville, Virginia, where he played 38 games and hit .327 with 8 home runs and 31 RBIs. Francoeur advanced steadily through the Braves minor league system, playing for Rome (Low A) in 2003, Myrtle Beach (High A) and Greenville (former AA) in 2004, and Mississippi (AA) in 2005.

Francoeur was a member of the Rome Braves inaugural season team which went on to win the 2003 South Atlantic League Championship. He led that team in home runs with 14.

In 2004, Francoeur was named the top prospect in the Braves organization by Baseball America. He was a member of the Carolina League regular season and postseason All-Star team. In 2005, he was selected to play in the All-Star Futures Game before getting called up by Atlanta.

=== Atlanta Braves (2005–2009) ===
Francoeur was promoted by Atlanta on July 6, 2005. He was part of a group of rookie players, nicknamed the "Baby Braves", that Atlanta called up from its minor league system during the 2005 season.

Francoeur made his MLB debut the following day when he started in right field against the Chicago Cubs in the second game of a doubleheader. In the bottom of the eighth inning he hit a 3-run homer to center field, his first Major League hit. Francoeur is famous for his promise at the very beginning of his career: he made the cover of the edition of August 26, 2005 of Sports Illustrated, who dubbed him "The Natural" after he hit .360 with a 1.067 OPS in his first 37 games. Francoeur finished the season batting .300/.336/.549 in 67 games, with 14 home runs, and 44 RBIs. During his rookie season he garnered a reputation as a free swinging fastball hitter, with his first walk not coming until his 128th plate appearance. On defense, Francoeur became known for having a strong and accurate arm, finishing the season with 13 outfield assists (third overall in MLB) despite playing less than half the season. He finished third in the National League Rookie of the Year voting while garnering the most second place votes.

Francoeur hit .260 with 29 homers and 103 RBIs in his first full season in the majors. He also became just the fourth Brave to play in all 162 games of a season, joining Félix Millán, Dale Murphy, and Andruw Jones. Francoeur was ejected for the first time in his career on July 16, 2006. On May 13, 2006, Francoeur hit a walk-off grand slam off Chad Cordero of the Washington Nationals, the first walk-off home run and grand slam of his career.

In his second full season in 2007, Francoeur batted .293, with 19 homers, and 105 RBIs. Francoeur also displayed talent on the defensive side of the field, leading the league in outfield assists with 19 while earning his first career Gold Glove. Francoeur played in all 162 games for the second consecutive season. He was ejected for the second time in his career on July 16, 2007, exactly one year to the day of his first ejection.

On April 12, 2008, Francoeur went 3 for 5 against the Washington Nationals including two home runs and a career high seven RBIs. He compiled a streak of 370 consecutive games played before sitting out the second game of a doubleheader, on May 20, 2008. On May 22, 2008, Francoeur went 3 for 4 against the New York Mets with an RBI triple, an RBI single, and a two-run home run, finishing a double short of a cycle.

After weeks of being mired in the worst slump of his career, Braves management optioned Francoeur to Double-A Mississippi on July 4, 2008, to work with his old hitting coach Phillip Wellman and refine his swing away from the pressurized major league setting. Francoeur had posted a line of .234/.287/.374 to that point of the season. Francoeur was recalled on July 7, 2008, after only three days in the minors because of the rash of injuries suffered by the Braves over the holiday weekend. His slump continued after his return to the majors; Francoeur posted a .234/.300/.324 line through September 10.

=== New York Mets (2009–2010) ===
On July 10, 2009, Francoeur was traded to the New York Mets for outfielder Ryan Church.

Francoeur made his Mets debut on July 11, 2009, and notched two RBIs in his first at bat. He finished the day going 2–4 with two RBIs, a strikeout, and was caught stealing once. On July 20, Francoeur hit his first home run as a Met off Washington Nationals pitcher Logan Kensing, during the ninth inning of that game.

On August 23, 2009, Francoeur became the second player in major league history (after Homer Summa in 1927) to hit into a game-ending unassisted triple play. He hit a line drive directly to Eric Bruntlett, second baseman for the Philadelphia Phillies. Francoeur re-signed with the Mets for 2010.

After being the Mets' starting right fielder for the first half of the 2010 season, Francoeur was replaced by Ángel Pagán to make room for the return of Carlos Beltrán in the second half.

=== Texas Rangers (2010) ===
On August 31, 2010, Francoeur was traded by the Mets to the Texas Rangers for infielder Joaquín Arias. Francoeur was utilized primarily for defensive purposes on the 2010 AL Champions. In the 2010 World Series against the San Francisco Giants he went hitless in 6 World Series at-bats.

=== Kansas City Royals (2011–2013) ===
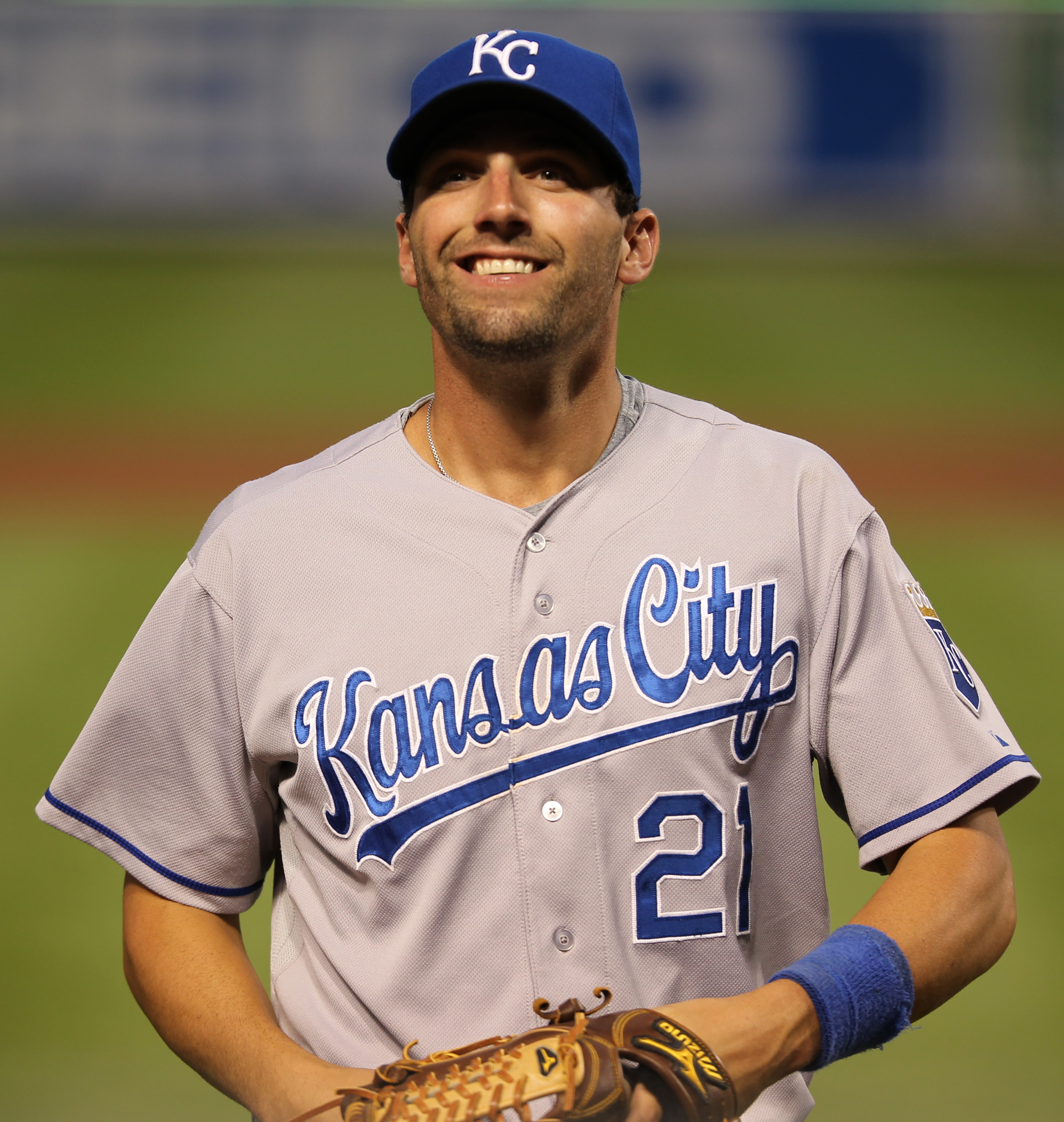
Francoeur during his tenure with the Kansas City Royals in 2011

On December 8, 2010, Francoeur signed a one-year deal with the Kansas City Royals worth $2.5 million which included a mutual option for the 2012 season.

On August 18, 2011, Francoeur agreed to a two-year extension with the Royals worth $13.5 million. He was designated for assignment on June 30, 2013 after hitting .208/.249/.322 in 59 games with the Royals.

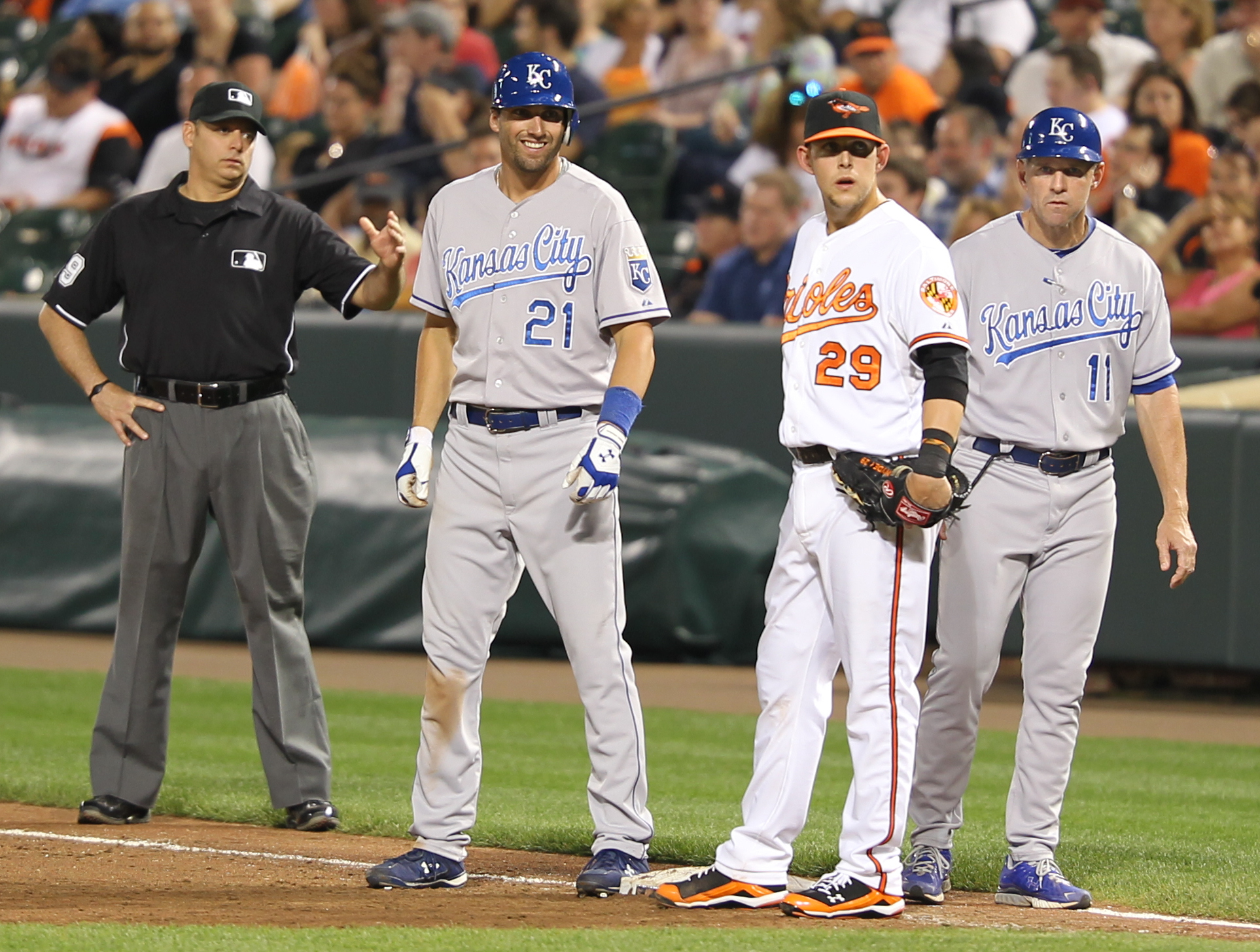
Jeff Francoeur, Brandon Snyder, Doug Sisson

=== San Francisco Giants (2013) ===
Francoeur was signed to a minor league contract by the Giants, on July 9, 2013. On July 13, his contract was purchased from the Fresno Grizzlies. Francoeur was designated for assignment on August 20, and released on August 22. In 22 games for the Giants, he recorded 12 hits, 4 RBIs, batting only .194.

=== Cleveland Indians ===
Francoeur signed a minor league deal with the Cleveland Indians on January 6, 2014. The organization released Francoeur on March 22, 2014.

=== San Diego Padres (2014) ===
Francoeur signed a minor league deal with the San Diego Padres, on March 26, 2014. He was assigned to the Triple-A El Paso Chihuahuas and hit the first home run in team history on April 3, 2014. They considered converting him into a pitcher, and he spent part of his time in the minors pitching. However, they decided to keep him as an outfielder in the end. He was called up and was in the starting lineup on July 23. On August 11, Francoeur was designated for assignment. He cleared waivers and was outrighted back to the Chihuahuas. Francoeur elected free agency in October 2014.

In March 2014, after he was released by the Cleveland Indians, Francoeur signed with the San Diego Padres and was sent to the El Paso Chihuahuas in Triple A. Francoeur's new teammates played an elaborate month-long prank on him by convincing him that pitcher Jorge Reyes was deaf. Reyes cooperated with the prank, maintaining the appearance of being deaf by not speaking or listening to music. Chihuahuas first baseman/outfielder Cody Decker made a short film about the prank.

=== Philadelphia Phillies (2015) ===
On November 13, 2014, Francoeur signed a minor league contract with the Philadelphia Phillies. On June 16, 2015, Francoeur was used as a relief pitcher in a 19–3 loss to the Baltimore Orioles, throwing the only scoreless inning of the game. However, he surrendered two runs in the next inning. In July, he began to have success both off the bench and in the starting lineup, including a stretch during which he hit three home runs in eight games. Although he expressed a desire to remain with the Phillies through the 2015 season and perhaps even beyond, his play indicated he might be moved near the trading deadline to bolster a contending team's outfield. However, he was not moved at the trade deadline. Ultimately, he finished the season with a .258 batting average, 13 home runs, and 45 RBIs.

=== Second stint with the Braves (2016) ===
On February 22, 2016, Francoeur agreed to a minor-league deal with the Braves, with an invitation to spring training. On March 29, the Braves purchased Francoeur's contract.

=== Miami Marlins (2016) ===
Francoeur was traded to the Miami Marlins on August 24, 2016, in a three-team deal that included the Texas Rangers. The Braves got minor league utility player Dylan Moore from the Rangers and minor league catcher Matt Foley from the Marlins.

== Broadcasting career ==
On May 12, 2017, it was announced that Francoeur would become a color analyst for select Atlanta Braves baseball games broadcast on Fox Sports South and Fox Sports Southeast. On November 29, 2018, the Braves announced that Jeff Francoeur would replace Joe Simpson as their lead television analyst. In September 2019, it was announced that he had been hired by TBS to work as an analyst for the network's NL Wild Card Game, NLDS (Washington vs. Los Angeles alongside Ernie Johnson Jr.) and National League Championship Series (NLCS) alongside Brian Anderson and Ron Darling. He repeated this role in 2020 for American League playoff games, as TBS had the AL contract that year.

== International career ==
Along with former Braves teammate Chipper Jones, Francoeur played on the USA team in the first ever World Baseball Classic, in March 2006. In six at bats, he hit a double, and scored one run.

== Personal life ==
Francoeur comes from a family of teachers. His parents, David and Karen, are both retired teachers. Francoeur's father, who is of French-Canadian heritage, is from Springfield, Massachusetts; his mother is from Green Bay, Wisconsin. His sister Heather (Francoeur) Karvis used to teach English and co-coached the girls' basketball team at St. Pius X Catholic High School in Atlanta with Josh Geffner. She now teaches and coaches the varsity girls basketball team at The Westminster Schools in Atlanta. His brother David Francoeur, Jr. teaches special education at Parkview High School in Lilburn, Georgia. In 2007, on SportSouth the "Big Braves Summer" promos, Francoeur revealed that his profession of choice (were he not a baseball player) would be coaching high school football.

While in third grade, he met his future wife, Catie McCoy. They started dating as seniors in high school, and married on November 3, 2007. They have four children: Emma Cate, Brayden, Eleanor, and Camden.

Francoeur lived with teammate Brian McCann in Lawrenceville, Georgia for their first two years in the majors, and he had his own fan club at Turner Field called "Francoeur's Franks."

In 2007, Francoeur participated in a fundraiser for the Atlanta-based charity with his friend Carl Schuster Dream House for Medically Fragile Children in which Delta Air Lines donated the value of 25,000 SkyMiles (frequent flyer miles) for each home run hit by Francoeur during the season.

Francoeur is a vocal and outspoken born-again Christian. On the strap of his left batting glove, Francoeur has the phrase "Joshua 1:9" written, referencing the Bible verse.

In 2022, Francoeur began hosting The Pure Athlete Podcast, a podcast that serves as a resource for youth sports coaches, parents, and athletes.
