= Lists of Major League Baseball players =

This list consists of players who have appeared in Major League Baseball. Note that the list also includes players who appeared in the National Association of Professional Base Ball Players, which is not universally considered a major league.

The list is broken down into a page of each letter to reduce the size. Some letters are also broken down further for the same reason.

== See also ==
- List of 19th-century baseball players
- List of baseball players who have played in the Caribbean Series
- List of Major League Baseball replacement players
- Lists of Negro league baseball players
- List of first black Major League Baseball players
- List of Jewish Major League Baseball players
- List of second-generation Major League Baseball players
- Lists of major league players by national origin
- Current MLB rosters
- MLB All-Time rosters
