= Mike Kickham =

American baseball player (born 1988)

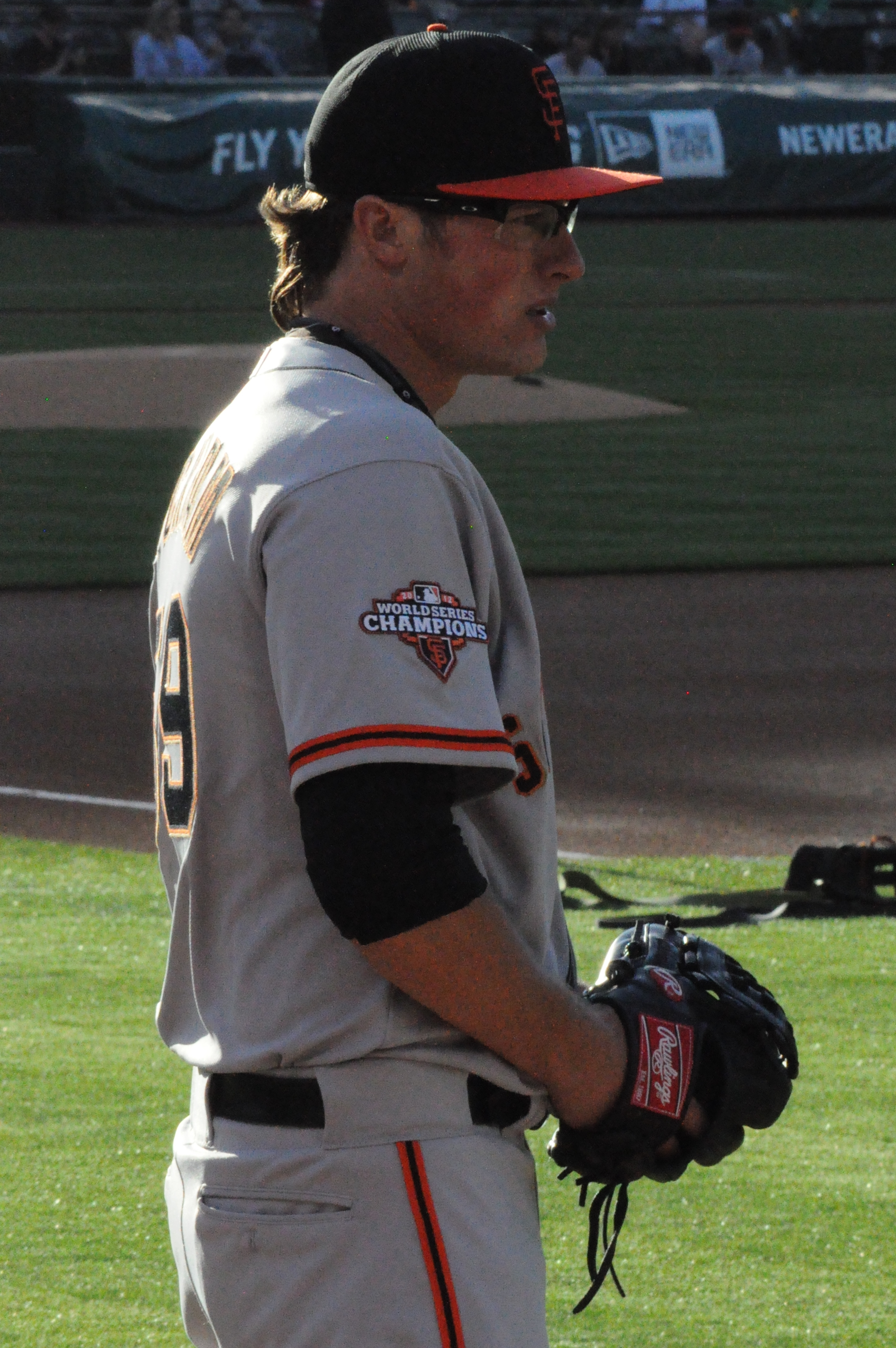
- Kickham with the San Francisco Giants

Free agent
- Pitcher
- Born: December 12, 1988 (age 37); St. Louis, Missouri, U.S.
- Bats: Left Throws: Left

MLB debut
- May 28, 2013, for the San Francisco Giants

MLB statistics (through 2021 season)
- Win–loss record: 1–4
- Earned run average: 10.10
- Strikeouts: 49
- Stats at Baseball Reference

Teams
- San Francisco Giants (2013–2014); Boston Red Sox (2020); Los Angeles Dodgers (2021)

Michael Joseph Kickham (born December 12, 1988) is an American professional baseball pitcher who is a free agent. He has previously played in Major League Baseball (MLB) for the San Francisco Giants, Boston Red Sox, and Los Angeles Dodgers. Listed at 6 feet 4 inches (1.93 m) and 220 pounds (100 kg), he throws and bats left-handed.

== Amateur career ==
Kickham attended Glendale High School in Springfield, Missouri, and played for the school's baseball team. His senior season as a Falcon, he posted a 1.16 ERA with 65 strikeouts. He also hit for a .390 batting average as an outfielder. Kickham earned all-conference status at both positions.

Kickham spent 2009 at Crowder College, where he went 3–3 with a 5.62 ERA. He struck out 47 batters in 41 innings. After Crowder, Kickham transferred to Missouri State University, where he was enrolled in premedical studies and studied biology. For the Missouri State Bears baseball team, Kickham had a 4–9 record with a 5.25 ERA and 103 strikeouts, in 96 innings spanning 15 games.

== Professional career ==
=== San Francisco Giants ===
The San Francisco Giants selected Kickham in the sixth round, with the 198th overall pick, of the 2010 MLB draft. After spending 2010 with the rookie league squad, he spent 2011 with the Augusta Greenjackets. In 2012, he was promoted to the Double-A Richmond Flying Squirrels, where he posted an 11–10 record and a 3.05 earned run average (ERA) in 28 games.

After two months with the Triple-A Fresno Grizzlies, the Giants promoted Kickham to the majors on May 26, 2013. Kickham made his debut in a start against the Oakland Athletics, pitching 2 1/3 innings while allowing four runs on four hits and four walks; the Giants failed to come back, and Kickham suffered the loss. With the Giants in 2013, Kickham made a total of 12 appearances (three starts), accruing an 0–3 record with 10.16 ERA and 29 strikeouts in 28 1/3 innings pitched. In 2014, Kickham appeared in two games for the Giants, both in relief, allowing five runs in two innings pitched for a 22.50 ERA. Overall, Kickham registered a 10.98 ERA for the Giants in a total of 14 appearances spanning 30 1/3 innings pitched.

=== Seattle Mariners ===
On December 23, 2014, Kickham was claimed off waivers by the Chicago Cubs. The Cubs then designated him for assignment on January 9.

Kickham was traded to the Seattle Mariners on January 14, 2015, in exchange for minor league pitcher Lars Huijer. In 5 starts for the Triple-A Tacoma Rainiers, he struggled to an 0-2 record and 7.29 ERA with 12 strikeouts over 21 innings of work. Kickham was designated for assignment by the Mariners on May 4, when they re-added left-handed reliever Joe Beimel to the active roster.

=== Texas Rangers ===
Kickham was claimed off waivers by the Texas Rangers on May 5, 2015. He made 7 appearances for the Triple-A Round Rock Express, posting a 1-0 record and 6.00 ERA with 4 strikeouts over 6 innings of work. Kickham was released by the Rangers on June 11.

Kickham signed with the Bridgeport Bluefish of the Atlantic League of Professional Baseball on July 24, 2015. However, he was released on July 28, without making an appearance for the club.

=== San Francisco Giants (second stint) ===
Kickham signed a minor league contract with the San Francisco Giants on January 18, 2016. In 6 appearances for the Double-A Richmond Flying Squirrels, he struggled to an 0-1 record and 6.75 ERA with 7 strikeouts across 10 2/3 innings pitched. Kickham was released by the Giants organization on May 30.

=== Kansas City T-Bones ===
Kickham signed with the Kansas City T-Bones of the American Association of Independent Professional Baseball on June 26, 2016. In 14 starts for Kansas City, Kickham compiled a 3-5 record and 2.83 ERA with 73 strikeouts across 86 innings pitched.

=== Miami Marlins ===
On February 9, 2017, Kickham's contract was sold to the Miami Marlins organization. In 27 games (25 starts) split between the Triple–A New Orleans Baby Cakes and Double–A Jacksonville Jumbo Shrimp, he posted a cumulative 8–10 record and 3.65 ERA with 119 strikeouts in 145 2/3 innings pitched. He elected free agency following the season on November 6.

On January 13, 2018, Kickham re-signed with Miami on a minor league contract. In 20 games split between New Orleans, Jacksonville, and the rookie–level Gulf Coast League Marlins, he accumulated a 3.64 ERA with 38 strikeouts in 42.0 innings of work. He elected free agency on November 2.

On November 16, 2018, Kickham again re-signed with Miami to a new minor league contract, and was invited to spring training. He appeared in 31 contests (13 starts) for New Orleans, registering a 5–5 record and 4.27 ERA with 84 strikeouts in 86 1/3 innings pitched. Kickham elected free agency after the year on November 4, 2019.

=== Boston Red Sox ===
On December 20, 2019, the Boston Red Sox signed Kickham to a minor league deal and invited him to spring training. His contract was selected on August 31, 2020. He made his first appearance with the Red Sox on September 2, against the Atlanta Braves. Kickham recorded his first MLB win on September 5, when he pitched two innings of scoreless relief and the Red Sox came back to defeat the Toronto Blue Jays with two ninth-inning runs. Overall with the 2020 Red Sox, Kickham appeared in five games (two starts), compiling a 1–1 record with 8.31 ERA and 16 strikeouts in 13 innings pitched. On October 26, Kickham was outrighted off of the 40-man roster and elected free agency.

=== Los Angeles Dodgers ===
On January 8, 2021, the Los Angeles Dodgers organization signed Kickham to a minor league contract. On May 2, Kickham was selected to the 40-man roster and added to the Dodgers' active roster. He pitched two innings for the Dodgers that night against the Milwaukee Brewers and allowed three runs on five hits. Kickham was designated for assignment the following day. On May 5, Kickham was outrighted to Triple-A. He spent the rest of the season with the Triple–A Oklahoma City Dodgers, where he had a 6.51 ERA in 20 appearances. Kickham elected free agency on October 14.

=== Mariachis de Guadalajara ===
On February 15, 2022, Kickham signed with the Algodoneros de Unión Laguna of the Mexican League. However, he was released on April 15, prior to the start of the LMB season. On April 27, Kickham signed with the Mariachis de Guadalajara of the Mexican League. He made two appearances, giving up 5 earned runs in 2.1 innings pitched. Kickham was released on May 2.

=== Florence Y'alls ===
On March 13, 2023, Kickham signed with the Florence Y'alls of the Frontier League. In 7 starts for Florence, he struggled to a 9.12 ERA with 21 strikeouts in 25 2/3 innings of work. On June 20, Kickham was released by the Y'alls.

=== Lexington Counter Clocks ===
On June 25, 2023, Kickham signed with the Lexington Counter Clocks of the Atlantic League of Professional Baseball. In 15 starts for the Counter Clocks, he struggled to a 1–7 record and 7.08 ERA with 55 strikeouts across 67 1/3 innings of work. On February 27, 2024, Kickham was released by Lexington.

=== Hagerstown Flying Boxcars ===
On March 14, 2024, Kickham signed with the Hagerstown Flying Boxcars of the Atlantic League of Professional Baseball. In 25 starts for Hagerstown, he posted a 7–4 record and 5.69 ERA with 100 strikeouts across 118 2/3 innings pitched.

On March 8, 2025, Kickham re-signed with the Boxcars for a second season. On June 14, Kickham pitched a no-hitter in a 1–0 win against the Staten Island FerryHawks. In 17 starts for the Boxcars, he compiled a 4-8 record and 4.57 ERA with 98 strikeouts across 102 1/3 innings pitched.

=== York Revolution ===
On August 1, 2025, Kickham was traded to the York Revolution in exchange for Marty Costes. In eight starts for the Revolution, he posted a 7-0 record and 3.94 ERA with 47 strikeouts across 45 2/3 innings pitched. With York, Kickham won the Atlantic League championship.

=== Acereros de Monclova ===
On December 23, 2025, Kickham signed with the Acereros de Monclova of the Mexican League. He did not make the team and was released prior to the start of the season.

== Scouting report ==
Kickham throws four pitches: a fastball at 91–95 miles per hour (146–153 km/h), a slider, a changeup, and an occasional curveball.
