= Paco Rodriguez =

American baseball player (born 1991)

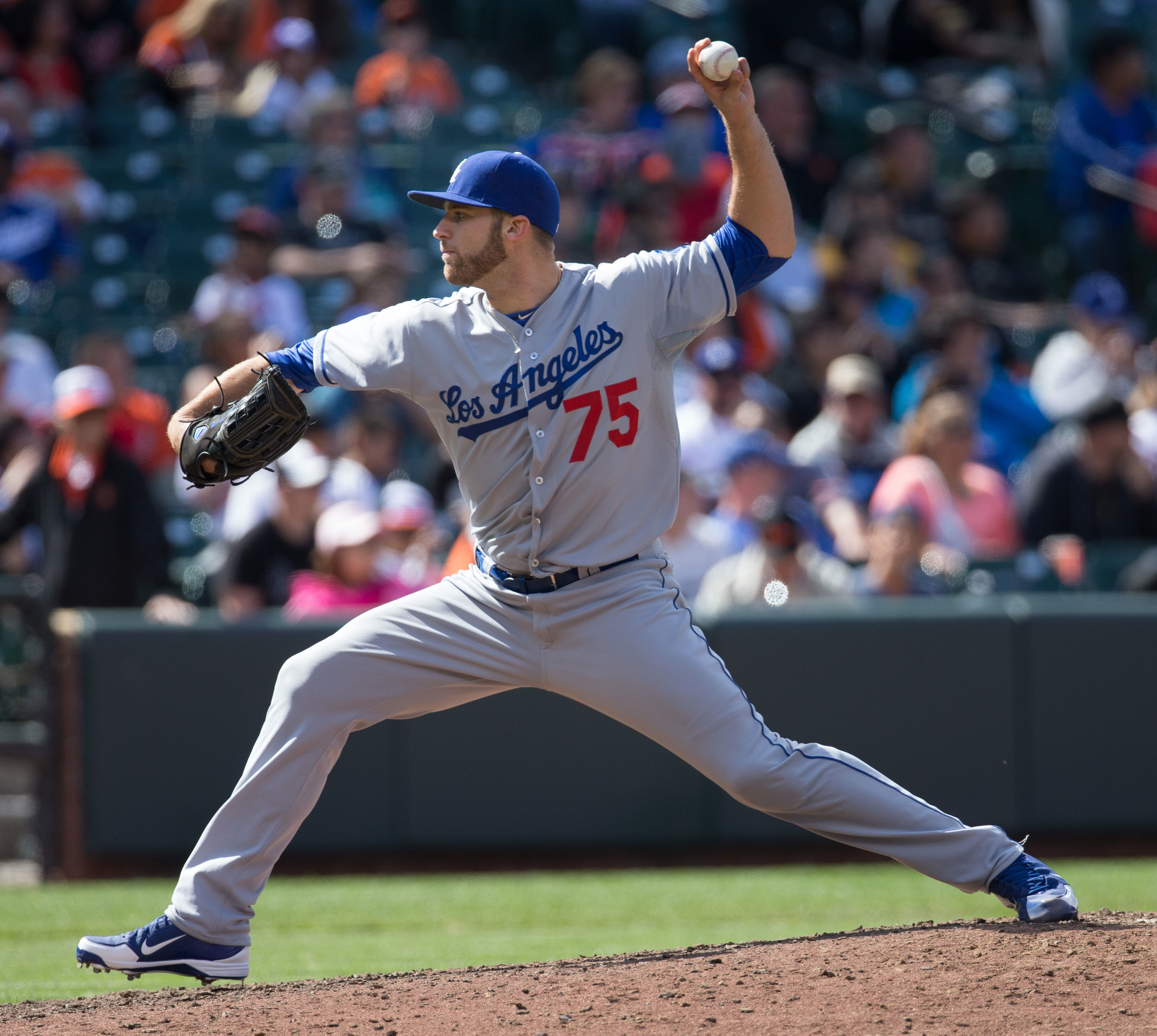
- Rodriguez with the Los Angeles Dodgers
- Relief pitcher
- Born: April 16, 1991 (age 35); Miami, Florida, U.S.
- Batted: Left Threw: Left

MLB debut
- September 9, 2012, for the Los Angeles Dodgers

Last MLB appearance
- May 29, 2015, for the Los Angeles Dodgers

MLB statistics
- Win–loss record: 4–5
- Earned run average: 2.53
- Strikeouts: 91
- Stats at Baseball Reference

Teams
- Los Angeles Dodgers (2012–2015)

Steven Francis "Paco" Rodríguez (born April 16, 1991) is an American former professional baseball pitcher. Prior to playing professionally, Rodriguez attended the University of Florida, where he played college baseball for the Florida Gators. He played in Major League Baseball (MLB) for the Los Angeles Dodgers from 2012 to 2015.

== Amateur career ==
Rodriguez is of Cuban descent. His parents met and married in Spain after defecting from their home country separately. They then moved to the Dominican Republic, Canada, and New Jersey before living in the Miami, Florida area, where their son was born on April 16, 1991. Rodriguez has an older sister and a younger sister who graduated from Brown University. He attended Gulliver Preparatory School in Miami, Florida, where he was named to Class 3A All-State and the Miami Herald All-Dade Team. The Houston Astros selected Rodriguez in the 48th round of the 2009 Major League Baseball draft after his high school graduation, but he did not sign.

Rodriguez enrolled at the University of Florida, in order to play college baseball for the Florida Gators baseball team in the Southeastern Conference (SEC). For the Gators, Rodriguez served as the team's closer. His career earned run average (ERA) at Florida (2.19) in 86 appearances is the lowest since the introduction of aluminum bats in 1974. He was an All-SEC selection in 2012. Rodriguez helped lead the Gators to the College World Series in three consecutive years.

== Professional career ==
=== Los Angeles Dodgers ===
The Los Angeles Dodgers selected Rodriguez in the second round of the 2012 Major League Baseball draft. Draft experts suggested that he would be one of the first players from the draft to reach the majors. After signing with the Dodgers, he was assigned to the Great Lakes Loons of the Class A Midwest League. After six appearances with the Loons, he was promoted to the Chattanooga Lookouts of the Class AA Southern League, where he pitched in 15 games with a 1.32 ERA.

The Dodgers promoted Rodriguez to the major leagues on September 5, 2012, and became the first 2012 draftee to reach the majors. He made his debut in a game on September 9 against the San Francisco Giants and retired the one batter he faced. He appeared in 11 games for the Dodgers in 2012, as a left-handed specialist, and allowed only one run to score in 6.2 innings.

Rodriguez started the 2013 season on the Dodgers' major league roster. After a rocky April, he became a trusted member of the Dodgers' bullpen, though he faltered in September and October under the heavy workload of an MLB season. From May through August, his ERA was 1.31 in 52 appearances. His season totals were a record of 3-4 with a 2.32 ERA in 76 games.

Rodriguez spent most of 2014 with the AAA Albuquerque Isotopes, but had four separate brief stints with the Dodgers. In July, Rodriguez strained an upper back muscle. In 32 games with the Isotopes, he was 2–3 with a 4.40 ERA and in 19 games for the Dodgers, he was 1–0 with a 3.86 ERA.

In May 2015, Rodriguez was added to the disabled list and underwent a bone spur removal surgery in July.

=== Atlanta Braves ===
On July 30, 2015, in a three-team trade, the Atlanta Braves acquired Rodriguez, Héctor Olivera, minor league pitcher Zachary Bird, and a competitive balance draft pick for the 2016 MLB draft, while the Dodgers acquired Mat Latos, Michael Morse, Bronson Arroyo, Alex Wood, Jim Johnson, Luis Avilán, and José Peraza, and the Miami Marlins acquired minor league pitchers Victor Araujo, Jeff Brigham, and Kevin Guzman. Though he was expected to recover sufficiently from multiple injuries by September and make his first appearances for the Braves, Rodriguez did not pitch at the major league level for the rest of the 2015 season, and underwent Tommy John surgery in September. On December 2, 2016, Rodriguez and the Braves avoided salary arbitration by agreeing to a one-year, $637,500 contract for the 2017 season. Rodriguez was released from his contract with the Braves on March 28, 2017.

=== Baltimore Orioles ===
On July 10, 2017, Rodriguez signed a minor league deal with the Baltimore Orioles. He made 9 appearances for the rookie–level Gulf Coast League Orioles, registering a 7.50 ERA with 10 strikeouts in 12.0 innings of work. He elected free agency following the season on November 6.

=== Minnesota Twins ===
Rodriguez signed with the Sugar Land Skeeters of the Atlantic League of Professional Baseball for the 2018 season. After one appearance for the Skeeters he signed a minor league contract with the Minnesota Twins. He was released by the organization on August 2, 2018.

=== Sugar Land Skeeters ===
On August 10, 2018, Rodriguez re-signed with the Sugar Land Skeeters of the Atlantic League of Professional Baseball. He became a free agent following the 2018 season. In 3 games 2.1 innings of relief he went 0-1 with a 15.43 ERA with 4 strikeouts.

=== San Diego Padres ===
On February 18, 2019, Rodriguez signed a minor league contract with the San Diego Padres organization. In 28 games split between the Double–A Amarillo Sod Poodles and Triple–A El Paso Chihuahuas, he compiled a 4–1 record and 3.35 ERA with 43 strikeouts across 48 1/3 innings pitched. Rodriguez elected free agency following the season on November 4.

== Pitching style ==
Rodriguez has an unusual and deceptive delivery in which, from the batter's perspective, he hides the ball behind his head before slinging it towards the plate.
