= Sandy Rosario =

Dominican baseball player

- Pitcher
- Born: August 22, 1985 (age 40); Salcedo, Dominican Republic
- Batted: Right Threw: Right

MLB debut
- September 23, 2010, for the Florida Marlins

Last appearance
- September 17, 2013, for the San Francisco Giants

MLB statistics
- Win–loss record: 3–2
- Earned run average: 4.93
- Strikeouts: 28
- Stats at Baseball Reference

Teams
- Florida/Miami Marlins (2010–2012); San Francisco Giants (2013)

Sandy Rosario (born August 22, 1985) is a Dominican former professional baseball pitcher. He played in Major League Baseball (MLB) for the Florida/Miami Marlins from 2010 to 2012 and San Francisco Giants in 2013.

== Career ==
=== Florida Marlins ===
Rosario signed as an international free agent with the Florida Marlins in 2004. He was called up to the major leagues for the first time on September 19, 2010, after winning the Southern League championship with the Jacksonville Suns. In his MLB debut on September 23, against the Milwaukee Brewers, the first and third pitches that Rosario threw were hit for home runs. He only gave up one more home run in his MLB career.

The Marlins promoted Rosario again in September 2011. He made four relief appearances, yielding one run over 3 2/3 innings, striking out two and walking two.

Rosario started the 2012 season with the Triple-A New Orleans Zephyrs and later pitched in four games for Miami, yielding six runs in three innings over four relief appearances. He was sent back down to the minors.

Rosario was claimed off waivers by several teams after the 2012 season, not lasting on a roster long enough to appear for a team. The Boston Red Sox claimed him on waivers on October 17. On November 20, Boston designated Rosario and four others for assignment. On November 28, he was traded to the Oakland Athletics. On November 10, the Red Sox again claimed him off waivers. Two days later, his trip on the waiver wire continued when he was claimed by the Chicago Cubs on December 12.

=== San Francisco Giants ===
On December 20, 2012, Rosario was claimed off waivers yet again, this time by the San Francisco Giants. He was an emotional pitcher on the mound for the Giants. He pitched in 43 games for the Giants in 2013, his final season in MLB. He became a free agent on December 2, 2013 after being non-tendered by the Giants. He re-signed with the Giants in January 2014. He pitched in the Giants' minor league system in 2014.

=== Delfines del Carmen ===
On February 20, 2015, Rosario signed with the Delfines del Carmen of the Mexican Baseball League. He was released on May 12.
