= Nick Noonan =

American baseball player (born 1989)

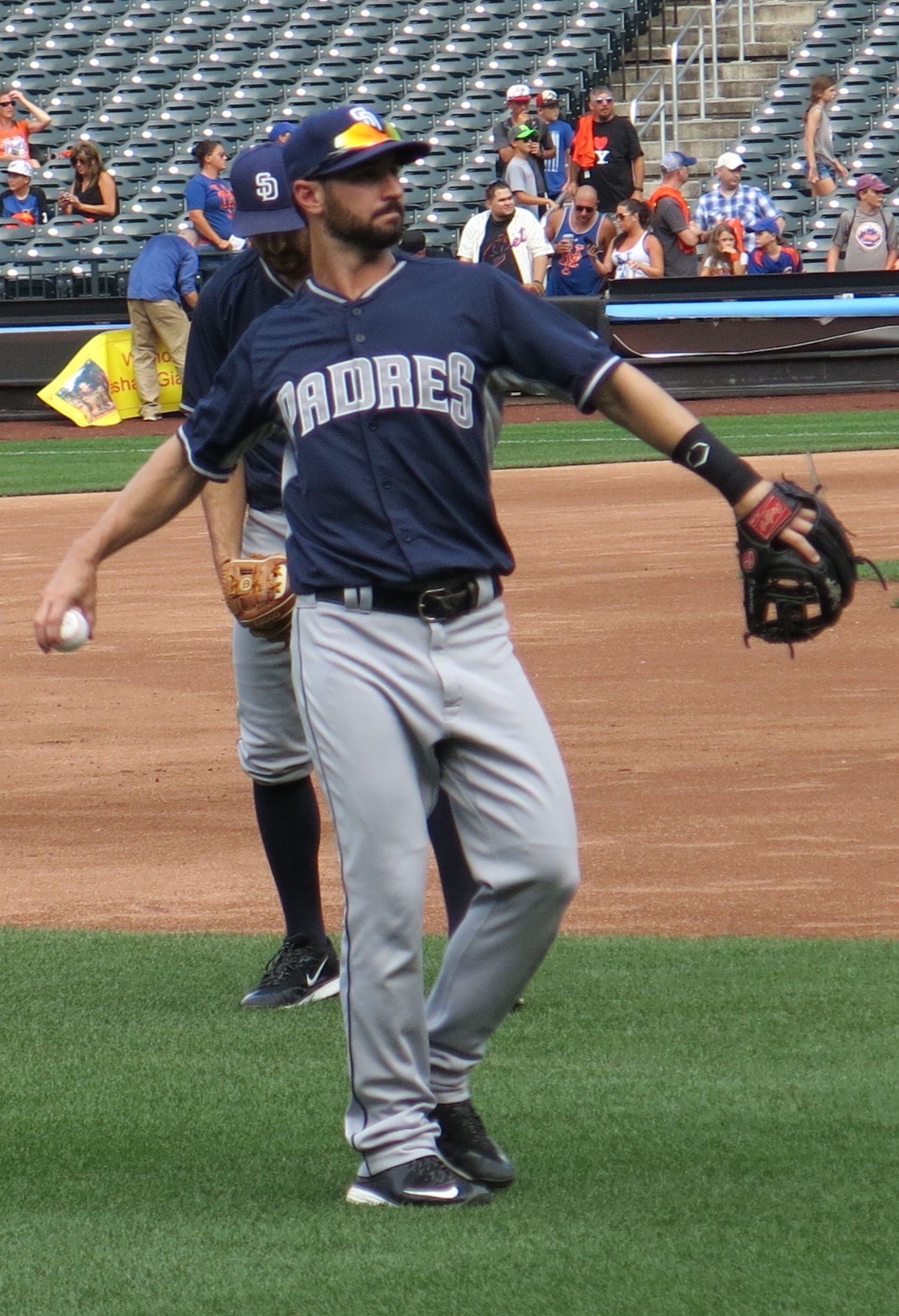
- Noonan with the Padres in 2016
- Infielder
- Born: May 4, 1989 (age 37); Poway, California, U.S.
- Batted: Left Threw: Right

MLB debut
- April 3, 2013, for the San Francisco Giants

Last MLB appearance
- August 19, 2016, for the San Diego Padres

MLB statistics
- Batting average: .193
- Home runs: 1
- Runs batted in: 9
- Stats at Baseball Reference

Teams
- San Francisco Giants (2013, 2015); San Diego Padres (2016)

Nicholas Murphy Noonan (born May 4, 1989) is an American former professional baseball infielder. He played in Major League Baseball (MLB) for the San Francisco Giants and the San Diego Padres.

== Career ==
=== San Francisco Giants ===
Noonan attended Francis W. Parker School in San Diego, California. He was named to the Aflac All-American West team. The Giants selected Noonan with their first round pick, 32nd overall, of the 2007 MLB draft. He signed for $1 million, bypassing a commitment to attend Clemson University.

After the 2012 season, the Giants added Noonan to their 40-man roster.

Noonan was added to the Giants' Opening Day 25-man roster just prior to the 2013 season. He had his first MLB at bat on April 3, 2013 against the Los Angeles Dodgers in Dodger Stadium. In the top of the 9th inning, he grounded out to the 2nd baseman to end the inning. Noonan would go on to hit for an average of .219 in a limited number of plate appearances (111) in 62 games.

Noonan was designated for assignment by San Francisco on July 25, 2014, without having appeared for the team on the year. He cleared waivers and was sent outright to the Triple-A Fresno Grizzlies on August 3.

=== New York Yankees ===
On December 15, 2014, Noonan signed a minor league contract with the New York Yankees. In 67 appearances for the Triple-A Scranton/Wilkes-Barre RailRiders, he batted .262/.308/.328 with one home run, 26 RBI, and one stolen base. Noonan was released by the Yankees organization on July 20, 2015.

=== San Francisco Giants (second stint) ===
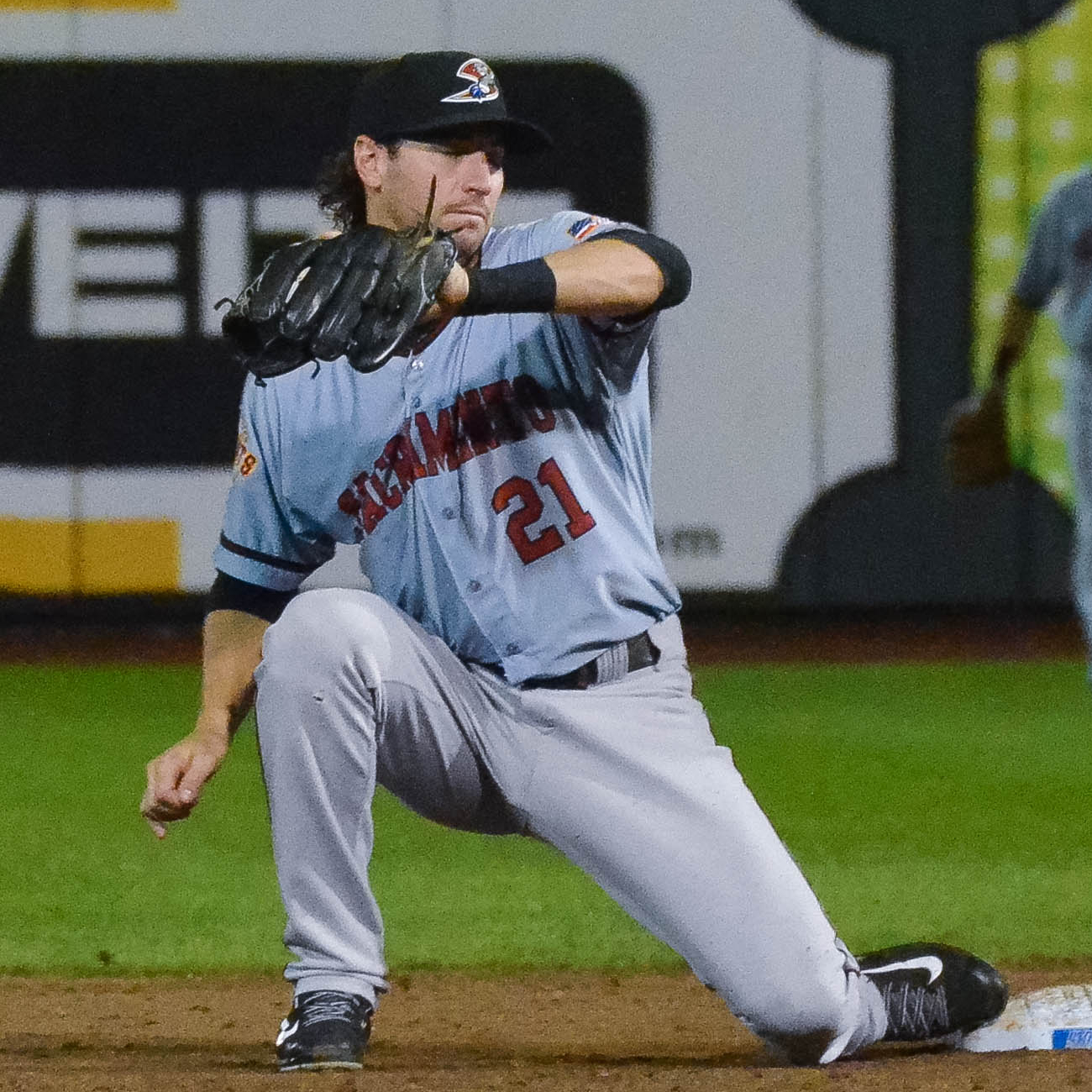
Noonan with the Sacramento River Cats in 2015

On August 6, 2015, Noonan signed a minor league contract with the San Francisco Giants organization. On September 1, the Giants selected Noonan's contract, adding him to their active roster. Noonan hit his first major league home run on September 30. In 14 appearances for San Francisco, he went 2-for-22 (.091) with one home run and three RBI. On October 15, Noonan was removed from the 40-man roster and sent outright to the Triple-A Sacramento River Cats; he subsequently rejected the assignment and elected free agency.

=== San Diego Padres ===
On February 8, 2016, Noonan signed a minor league contract with the San Diego Padres organization. After playing for the Triple-A El Paso Chihuahuas, the Padres promoted Noonan to the major leagues on August 10, fulfilling his childhood dream to play for the Padres. In seven appearances for San Diego, he went 3-for-18 (.167) with one RBI. Noonan was designated for assignment by the Padres on September 21. He cleared waivers and was sent outright to El Paso on September 28.

=== Milwaukee Brewers ===
On February 14, 2017, Noonan signed a minor league contract with the Milwaukee Brewers organization. Noonan was assigned to the Triple-A Colorado Springs Sky Sox to begin the regular season.

=== Miami Marlins ===
On May 11, 2017, Noonan was traded to the Miami Marlins in exchange for cash considerations; the move was made following injuries to Martín Prado, Adeiny Hechavarría, and Miguel Rojas. Noonan played in 23 games with the Triple-A New Orleans Baby Cakes, hitting .156/.241/.221 with one home run, eight RBI, and two stolen bases.

=== Milwaukee Brewers (second stint) ===
On June 16, 2017, Noonan was traded back to the Milwaukee Brewers organization. In 62 total appearances for the Triple–A Colorado Springs SkySox, he batted .304/.343/.419 with two home runs and 30 RBI. Noonan elected free agency following the season on November 6.

=== Texas Rangers ===
On February 7, 2018, Noonan signed a minor league contract with the Oakland Athletics that included an invitation to spring training. He was released by Oakland prior to the start of the season on March 30.

On April 14, 2018, Noonan signed a minor league contract with the Texas Rangers. He spent the majority of the season in Triple–A, and also made appearances for the rookie–level Arizona League Rangers and Double–A Frisco RoughRiders. In 75 games for the Triple–A Round Rock Express, Noonan hit .256/.297/.363 with four home runs and 32 RBI. He elected free agency following the season on November 2.
