= 2013 Philadelphia Phillies season =

2013 Philadelphia Phillies
- League: National League
- Division: East
- Ballpark: Citizens Bank Park
- City: Philadelphia
- Record: 73–89 (.451)
- Divisional place: 4th
- Owners: Bill Giles; David Montgomery
- General managers: Rubén Amaro, Jr.
- Managers: Charlie Manuel (through August 16); Ryne Sandberg (interim: August 16 – September 29)
- Television: Comcast SportsNet Philadelphia; Comcast Network Philadelphia; PHL17 (MyNetworkTV) (Tom McCarthy, Chris Wheeler, Gary Matthews)
- Radio: Phillies Radio Network; WPHT 1210 AM & WIP 94.1 FM (English) (Scott Franzke, Larry Andersen, Jim Jackson); WTTM (Spanish) (Danny Martinez, Bill Kulik, Rickie Ricardo)
- Stats: ESPN.com; Baseball Reference

The 2013 Philadelphia Phillies season was the 131st season in the history of the franchise. The Phillies played their first game of the season against the Atlanta Braves on April 1. The Phillies finished with a record of 73–89, clinching their first losing season since 2002.

== Offseason transactions ==
- December 6, 2012: Acquired Ben Revere from Minnesota Twins for Vance Worley and Trevor May.
- December 9, 2012: Acquired Michael Young from Texas Rangers for pitcher Josh Lindblom and minor league pitcher Lisalverto Bonilla.
- December 15, 2012: Signed Mike Adams to a two-year deal.
- December 15, 2012: Signed John Lannan to a one-year deal.
- January 22, 2013: Signed Delmon Young to a one-year deal.
- January 29, 2013: Signed Chad Durbin to a one-year deal.

== Season notes ==
On April 5, the Kansas City Royals beat the Philadelphia Phillies 13–4, spoiling their home opener with a sellout crowd of 45,307 at Citizens Bank Park. The interleague matchup was a rare one between teams who first met in the 1980 World Series, as the Royals previously only visited Philadelphia in 2004. Hall of Famers Mike Schmidt and George Brett, rivals when the Phillies beat the Royals to win their first championship 33 years earlier, threw out the first pitches (along with SNL's Joe Piscopo).

On August 16, 2013, the Phillies fired manager Charlie Manuel replacing him with third base coach Ryne Sandberg on an interim basis. At the time, the Phillies were 53–67, and Manuel had exactly 1,000 wins with the Phillies, a milestone he achieved on August 12. The league and fan base mostly expressed sadness and gratitude to Manuel for his tenure. Several Phillies veterans, including Chase Utley and Cole Hamels, expressed regret and guilt feeling their lack of production led to Manuel's firing; they viewed Manuel as a fatherly figure. Sandberg commented the next day, "It was a roller coaster of a day emotionally. It affected me and I think it affects the players." Manuel received significant accolades within the media for his class in handling the situation, while the Phillies organization, namely general manager Rubén Amaro, Jr., were criticized within the media for firing Manuel at that point in the season, as well as for not having better players.

== Season standings ==
=== National League East ===
NL East
Team	W	L	Pct.	GB	Home	Road
Atlanta Braves	96	66	.593	—	56‍–‍25	40‍–‍41
Washington Nationals	86	76	.531	10	47‍–‍34	39‍–‍42
New York Mets	74	88	.457	22	33‍–‍48	41‍–‍40
Philadelphia Phillies	73	89	.451	23	43‍–‍38	30‍–‍51
Miami Marlins	62	100	.383	34	36‍–‍45	26‍–‍55

=== National League Wild Card ===
Division winners
Team	W	L	Pct.
St. Louis Cardinals	97	65	.599
Atlanta Braves	96	66	.593
Los Angeles Dodgers	92	70	.568

Wild Card teams (Top 2 teams qualify for postseason)
Team	W	L	Pct.	GB
Pittsburgh Pirates	94	68	.580	+4
Cincinnati Reds	90	72	.556	—
Washington Nationals	86	76	.531	4
Arizona Diamondbacks	81	81	.500	9
San Francisco Giants	76	86	.469	14
San Diego Padres	76	86	.469	14
Colorado Rockies	74	88	.457	16
New York Mets	74	88	.457	16
Milwaukee Brewers	74	88	.457	16
Philadelphia Phillies	73	89	.451	17
Chicago Cubs	66	96	.407	24
Miami Marlins	62	100	.383	28

== Record vs. opponents ==
2013 National League record Source: MLB Standings Grid – 2013
Team	AZ	ATL	CHC	CIN	COL	LAD	MIA	MIL	NYM	PHI	PIT	SD	SF	STL	WSH	AL
Arizona	—	2–4	4–3	3–4	12–7	10–9	4–2	6–1	3–4	3–4	3–3	7–12	7–12	4–3	2–4	11–9
Atlanta	4–2	—	5–1	4–3	6–1	5–2	13–6	2–4	10–9	11–8	4–3	1–5	3–4	4–3	13–6	11–9
Chicago	3–4	1–5	—	5–14	3–3	1–6	4–3	6–13	3–3	3–3	7–12	3–4	4–3	7–12	3–4	13–7
Cincinnati	4–3	3–4	14–5	—	2–4	4–3	6–1	10–9	4–2	4–2	8–11	3–3	6–1	8–11	3–4	11–9
Colorado	7–12	1–6	3–3	4–2	—	10–9	3–4	4–2	3–4	3–4	4–2	12–7	9–10	3–4	3–4	5–15
Los Angeles	9–10	2–5	6–1	3–4	9–10	—	5–2	4–2	5–1	5–2	4–2	11–8	8–11	4–3	5–1	12–8
Miami	2–4	6–13	3–4	1–6	4–3	2–5	—	1–5	11–8	7–12	2–4	3–4	4–3	2–4	5–14	9–11
Milwaukee	1–6	4–2	13–6	9–10	2–4	2–4	5–1	—	4–3	5–2	7–12	3–4	5–2	5–14	3–4	6–14
New York	4–3	9–10	3–3	2–4	4–3	1–5	8–11	3–4	—	10–9	2–5	4–3	4–2	2–5	7–12	11–9
Philadelphia	4–3	8–11	3–3	2–4	4–3	2–5	12–7	2–5	9–10	—	3–4	4–2	3–3	2–5	8–11	7–13
Pittsburgh	3–3	3–4	12–7	11–8	2–4	2–4	4–2	12–7	5–2	4–3	—	3–4	4–3	10–9	4–3	15–5
San Diego	12–7	5–1	4–3	3–3	7–12	8–11	4–3	4–3	3–4	2–4	4–3	—	8–11	2–4	2–5	8–12
San Francisco	12–7	4–3	3–4	1–6	10–9	11–8	3–4	2–5	2–4	3–3	3–4	11–8	—	2–4	3–3	6–14
St. Louis	3–4	3–4	12–7	11–8	4–3	3–4	4–2	14–5	5–2	5–2	9–10	4–2	4–2	—	6–0	10–10
Washington	4–2	6–13	4–3	4–3	4–3	1–5	14–5	4–3	12–7	11–8	3–4	5–2	3–3	0–6	—	11–9

== Game log ==
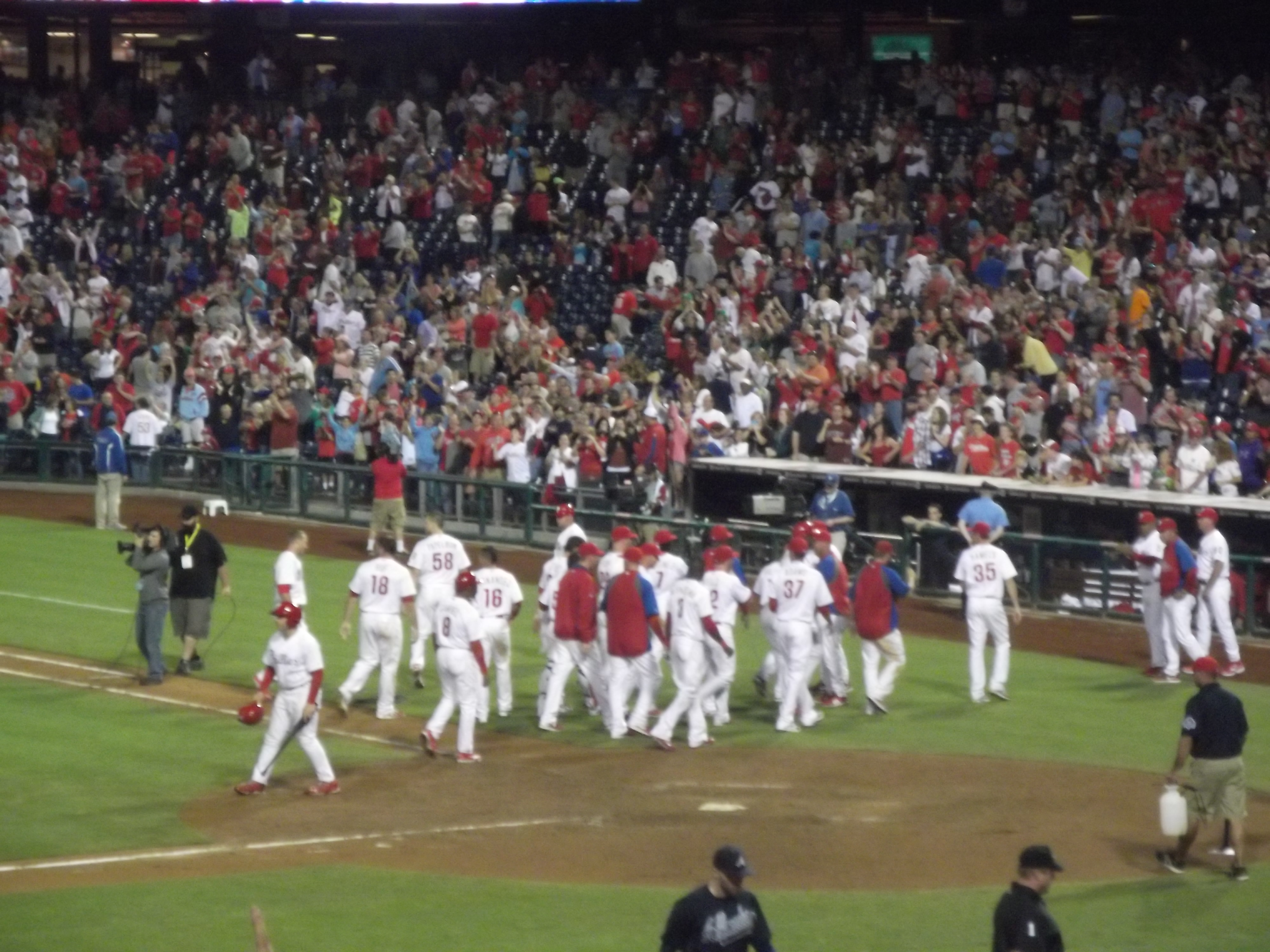
The Phillies celebrate after Freddy Galvis hits a walk-off home run on September 7, 2013

Legend
	Phillies win
	Phillies loss
	Postponement
**Bold**	Phillies team member

2013 Game Log
Overall Record: 73–89
April (12–15)

#	Date	Opponent	Score	Win	Loss	Save	Attendance	Record
1	April 1	@ Braves	5–7	Luis Avilán (1–0)	**Cole Hamels** (0–1)	Craig Kimbrel (1)	51,456	0–1
2	April 3	@ Braves	2–9	Paul Maholm (1–0)	**Roy Halladay** (0–1)	None	24,289	0–2
3	April 4	@ Braves	2–0	**Cliff Lee** (1–0)	Kris Medlen (0–1)	**Jonathan Papelbon** (1)	18,295	1–2
4	April 5	Royals	4–13	Bruce Chen (1–0)	**Kyle Kendrick** (0–1)	None	45,307	1–3
5	April 6	Royals	4–3	**Antonio Bastardo** (1–0)	Greg Holland (0–1)	None	39,475	2–3
6	April 7	Royals	8–9	James Shields (1–1)	**Cole Hamels** (0–2)	Kelvin Herrera (1)	39,451	2–4
7	April 8	Mets	2–7	Matt Harvey (2–0)	**Roy Halladay** (0–2)	None	35,393	2–5
8	April 9	Mets	8–3	**Cliff Lee** (2–0)	Dillon Gee (0–2)	None	38,305	3–5
9	April 10	Mets	7–3	**Kyle Kendrick** (1–1)	Jeremy Hefner (0–2)	None	38,715	4–5
10	April 12	@ Marlins	3–1 (10)	**Phillippe Aumont** (1–0)	Jon Rauch (0–1)	**Jonathan Papelbon** (2)	17,923	5–5
11	April 13	@ Marlins	1–2	Steve Cishek (1–1)	**Phillippe Aumont** (1–1)	None	20,037	5–6
12	April 14	@ Marlins	2–1	**Roy Halladay** (1–2)	Jon Rauch (0–2)	**Jonathan Papelbon** (3)	21,412	6–6
13	April 15	@ Reds	2–4	Bronson Arroyo (2–1)	**Jeremy Horst** (0–1)	Aroldis Chapman (3)	17,345	6–7
14	April 16	@ Reds	0–1^{^{[a]}}	Aroldis Chapman (2–0)	**Phillippe Aumont** (1–2)	None	15,544	6–8
15	April 17	@ Reds	2–11	Mike Leake (1–0)	**John Lannan** (0–1)	None	16,467	6–9
16	April 18	Cardinals	3–4	Adam Wainwright (3–1)	**Mike Adams** (0–1)	Edward Mujica (1)	34,256	6–10
17	April 19	Cardinals	8–2 (7)	**Roy Halladay** (2–2)	Jaime García (1–1)	None	34,092	7–10
18	April 20	Cardinals	0–5	Lance Lynn (3–0)	**Cliff Lee** (2–1)	None	41,050	7–11
19	April 21	Cardinals	7–3	**Mike Adams** (1–1)	Mitchell Boggs (0–2)	None	35,115	8–11
20	April 22	Pirates	3–2	**Raúl Valdés** (1–0)	Jared Hughes (1–2)	**Jonathan Papelbon** (4)	35,385	9–11
21	April 23	Pirates	0–2	Jeff Locke (2–1)	**Cole Hamels** (0–3)	Jason Grilli (8)	31,002	9–12
22	April 24	Pirates	3–5	Vin Mazzaro (1–0)	**Mike Adams** (1–2)	Jason Grilli (9)	32,158	9–13
23	April 25	Pirates	4–6	Justin Wilson (2–0)	**Phillippe Aumont** (1–3)	Tony Watson (1)	33,443	9–14
24	April 26	@ Mets	4–0	**Kyle Kendrick** (2–1)	Dillon Gee (1–4)	None	21,582	10–14
25	April 27	@ Mets	9–4	**Jonathan Pettibone** (1–0)	Shaun Marcum (0–1)	None	29,248	11–14
26	April 28	@ Mets	5–1	**Cole Hamels** (1–3)	Jon Niese (2–2)	None	28,990	12–14
27	April 30	@ Indians	2–14	Zach McAllister (2–3)	**Roy Halladay** (2–3)	None	10,841	12–15

May (14–14)

#	Date	Opponent	Score	Win	Loss	Save	Attendance	Record
28	May 1	@ Indians	0–6	Trevor Bauer (1–1)	**Cliff Lee** (2–2)	None	12,730	12–16
29	May 2	Marlins	7–2	**Kyle Kendrick** (3–1)	Alex Sanabia (2–4)	None	36,978	13–16
30	May 3	Marlins	4–1	**Jonathan Pettibone** (2–0)	Ricky Nolasco (2–3)	**Jonathan Papelbon** (5)	36,292	14–16
31	May 4	Marlins	0–2	José Fernández (1–2)	**Cole Hamels** (1–4)	Steve Cishek (4)	40,091	14–17
32	May 5	Marlins	2–14	Kevin Slowey (1–2)	**Roy Halladay** (2–4)	None	45,276	14–18
33	May 6	@ Giants	6–2	**Cliff Lee** (3–2)	Madison Bumgarner (3–1)	None	41,171	15–18
34	May 7	@ Giants	6–2	**Kyle Kendrick** (4–1)	Tim Lincecum (2–3)	None	41,226	16–18
35	May 8	@ Giants	3–4 (10)	Javier López (1–0)	**Antonio Bastardo** (1–1)	None	41,048	16–19
36	May 9	@ Diamondbacks	1–2	Patrick Corbin (5–0)	**Cole Hamels** (1–5)	Heath Bell (4)	20,002	16–20
37	May 10	@ Diamondbacks	2–3	Tony Sipp (2–1)	**Mike Adams** (1–3)	David Hernandez (1)	31,900	16–21
38	May 11	@ Diamondbacks	3–1	**Cliff Lee** (4–2)	Trevor Cahill (2–4)	**Jonathan Papelbon** (6)	28,113	17–21
39	May 12	@ Diamondbacks	4–2 (10)	**Justin De Fratus** (1–0)	Matt Reynolds (0–1)	**Jonathan Papelbon** (7)	32,785	18–21
40	May 14	Indians	6–2	**Jonathan Pettibone** (3–0)	Scott Kazmir (2–2)	None	39,689	19–21
41	May 15	Indians	4–10	Corey Kluber (3–2)	**Cole Hamels** (1–6)	None	38,440	19–22
42	May 17	Reds	5–3	**Justin De Fratus** (2–0)	Sean Marshall (0–1)	**Jonathan Papelbon** (8)	43,129	20–22
43	May 18	Reds	0–10	Bronson Arroyo (4–4)	**Kyle Kendrick** (4–2)	None	41,817	20–23
44	May 19	Reds	3–2	**Antonio Bastardo** (2–1)	Aroldis Chapman (3–2)	None	41,009	21–23
45	May 20	@ Marlins	1–5	Alex Sanabia (3–6)	**Cole Hamels** (1–7)	None	13,231	21–24
46	May 21	@ Marlins	7–3	**Tyler Cloyd** (1–0)	Duane Below (0–1)	None	13,996	22–24
47	May 22	@ Marlins	3–0	**Cliff Lee** (5–2)	Kevin Slowey (1–5)	None	15,520	23–24
48	May 24	@ Nationals	2–5	Jordan Zimmermann (8–2)	**Kyle Kendrick** (4–3)	Rafael Soriano (14)	28,980	23–25
49	May 25	@ Nationals	5–3	**Chad Durbin** (1–0)	Drew Storen (0–1)	**Jonathan Papelbon** (9)	38,012	24–25
50	May 26	@ Nationals	1–6	Stephen Strasburg (3–5)	**Cole Hamels** (1–8)	None	39,033	24–26
51	May 27	@ Red Sox	3–9	Alfredo Aceves (2–1)	**Tyler Cloyd** (1–1)	None	33,627	24–27
52	May 28	@ Red Sox	3–1	**Cliff Lee** (6–2)	Ryan Dempster (2–6)	**Jonathan Papelbon** (10)	33,643	25–27
53	May 29	Red Sox	4–3	**Kyle Kendrick** (5–3)	John Lackey (3–5)	**Jonathan Papelbon** (11)	38,831	26–27
54	May 30	Red Sox	2–9	Franklin Morales (1–0)	**Jonathan Pettibone** (3–1)	None	40,083	26–28
55	May 31	Brewers	5–8	Yovani Gallardo (4–5)	**Cole Hamels** (1–9)	Francisco Rogríguez (2)	37,420	26–29

June (13–15)

#	Date	Opponent	Score	Win	Loss	Save	Attendance	Record
56	June 1	Brewers	3–4	Wily Peralta (4–6)	**Tyler Cloyd** (1–2)	Francisco Rogríguez (3)	41,114	26–30
57	June 2	Brewers	7–5	**Cliff Lee** (7–2)	Michael Fiers (1–4)	**Antonio Bastardo** (1)	40,613	27–30
58	June 3	Marlins	7–2	**Kyle Kendrick** (6–3)	Tom Koehler (0–4)	None	35,087	28–30
59	June 4	Marlins	7–3 (11)	**Michael Stutes** (1–0)	Edgar Olmos (0–1)	None	38,932	29–30
60	June 5	Marlins	6–1	**Cole Hamels** (2–9)	A. J. Ramos (0–2)	None	38,643	30–30
61	June 6	@ Brewers	5–1	**Tyler Cloyd** (2–2)	Wily Peralta (4–7)	None	21,581	31–30
62	June 7	@ Brewers	4–5	Francisco Rodríguez (1–0)	**Jeremy Horst** (0–2)	None	31,417	31–31
63	June 8	@ Brewers	3–4	Tyler Thornburg (1–0)	**Kyle Kendrick** (6–4)	Francisco Rodríguez (4)	38,267	31–32
64	June 9	@ Brewers	1–9	Kyle Lohse (2–6)	**Jonathan Pettibone** (3–2)	None	38,300	31–33
65	June 11	@ Twins	2–3	Brian Duensing (1–1)	**Mike Adams** (1–4)	Glen Perkins (14)	30,104	31–34
66	June 12	@ Twins	3–4	Brian Duensing (2–1)	**Antonio Bastardo** (2–2)	Glen Perkins (15)	28,910	31–35
67	June 13	@ Twins	3–2	**Cliff Lee** (8–2)	Jared Burton (0–4)	**Jonathan Papelbon** (12)	28,519	32–35
68	June 14	@ Rockies	8–7	**Michael Stutes** (2–0)	Wilton López (1–3)	**Jonathan Papelbon** (13)	36,114	33–35
69	June 15	@ Rockies	5–10	Tyler Chatwood (4–1)	**Jonathan Pettibone** (3–3)	None	35,516	33–36
70	June 16	@ Rockies	2–5	Jhoulys Chacín (5–3)	**Cole Hamels** (2–10)	Rex Brothers (3)	45,186	33–37
71	June 17	Nationals	5–4	**Jonathan Papelbon** (1–0)	Fernando Abad (0–2)	None	44,990	34–37
72	June 18	Nationals	4–2	**Cliff Lee** (9–2)	Ross Detwiler (2–5)	**Jonathan Papelbon** (14)	38,188	35–37
73	June 19	Nationals	2–6	Drew Storen (2–1)	**Michael Stutes** (2–1)	None	39,594	35–38
74	June 21	Mets	3–4	Jeremy Hefner (2–6)	**Cole Hamels** (2–11)	Bobby Parnell (12)	40,062	35–39
75	June 22	Mets	8–7	**Jonathan Papelbon** (2–0)	Carlos Torres (0–1)	None	45,725	36–39
76	June 23	Mets	0–8	Matt Harvey (7–1)	**John Lannan** (0–2)	None	44,951	36–40
77	June 24	@ Padres	3–4 (10)	Joe Thatcher (3–1)	**Justin De Fratus** (2–1)	None	26,265	36–41
78	June 25	@ Padres	6–2	**Kyle Kendrick** (7–4)	Jason Marquis (9–3)	None	24,695	37–41
79	June 26	@ Padres	7–5 (13)	**Joe Savery** (1–0)	Tommy Layne (0–2)	**Jonathan Papelbon** (15)	25,610	38–41
80	June 27	@ Dodgers	4–6	Zack Greinke (5–2)	**Justin De Fratus** (2–2)	Kenley Jansen (7)	51,037	38–42
81	June 28	@ Dodgers	16–1	**John Lannan** (1–2)	Chris Capuano (2–5)	None	48,828	39–42
82	June 29	@ Dodgers	3–4	Kenley Jansen (2–3)	**Justin De Fratus** (2–3)	None	52,455	39–43
83	June 30	@ Dodgers	1–6	Stephen Fife (3–2)	**Kyle Kendrick** (7–5)	None	42,405	39–44

July (11–13)

#	Date	Opponent	Score	Win	Loss	Save	Attendance	Record
84	July 2	@ Pirates	3–1	**Jonathan Pettibone** (4–3)	Brandon Cumpton (0–1)	**Jonathan Papelbon** (16)	30,301	40–44
85	July 3	@ Pirates	5–6	Jeff Locke (8–1)	**John Lannan** (1–3)	Jason Grilli (28)	33,197	40–45
86	July 4	@ Pirates	6–4	**Cole Hamels** (3–11)	Gerrit Cole (4–1)	**Jonathan Papelbon** (17)	35,328	41–45
87	July 5	Braves	5–4	**Cliff Lee** (10–2)	Paul Maholm (9–7)	**Jonathan Papelbon** (18)	42,044	42–45
88	July 6	Braves	4–13	Tim Hudson (5–7)	**Kyle Kendrick** (7–6)	None	37,044	42–46
89	July 7	Braves	7–3	**Jonathan Pettibone** (5–3)	Kris Medlen (6–8)	None	38,148	43–46
90	July 8	Nationals	3–2	**John Lannan** (2–3)	Dan Haren (4–10)	**Jonathan Papelbon** (19)	33,061	44–46
91	July 9	Nationals	4–2	**Cole Hamels** (4–11)	Taylor Jordan (0–2)	**Antonio Bastardo** (2)	33,502	45–46
92	July 10	Nationals	1–5	Gio González (7–3)	**Cliff Lee** (10–3)	None	34,513	45–47
93	July 11	Nationals	3–1	**Kyle Kendrick** (8–6)	Jordan Zimmermann (12–4)	**Jonathan Papelbon** (20)	40,086	46–47
–	July 12	White Sox	Postponed (rain); Makeup: July 13					
94	July 13 (1)	White Sox	4–5 (11)	Ramón Troncoso (1–2)	**J. C. Ramírez** (0–1)	Addison Reed (24)	41,562	46–48
95	July 13 (2)	White Sox	2–1 (13)	**Joe Savery** (2–0)	Simón Castro (0–1)	None	43,249	47–48
96	July 14	White Sox	4–3 (10)	**Antonio Bastardo** (3–2)	David Purcey (0–1)	None	40,151	48–48
–	July 16	**2013 Major League Baseball All-Star Game at Citi Field in Queens, New York**						
97	July 19	@ Mets	13–8	**Kyle Kendrick** (9–6)	Jeremy Hefner (4–7)	None	35,021	49–48
98	July 20	@ Mets	4–5	Gonzalez Germen (1–1)	**Cole Hamels** (4–12)	Bobby Parnell (18)	26,722	49–49
99	July 21	@ Mets	0–5	Matt Harvey (8–2)	**Cliff Lee** (10–4)	None	32,127	49–50
100	July 23	@ Cardinals	1–4	Shelby Miller (10–6)	**Jonathan Pettibone** (5–4)	Edward Mujica (29)	44,780	49–51
101	July 24	@ Cardinals	3–11	Jake Westbrook (7–4)	**John Lannan** (2–4)	None	44,317	49–52
102	July 25	@ Cardinals	1–3	Lance Lynn (12–5)	**Kyle Kendrick** (9–7)	Edward Mujica (30)	45,567	49–53
103	July 26	@ Tigers	1–2	Doug Fister (9–5)	**Cole Hamels** (4–13)	Joaquín Benoit (10)	42,317	49–54
104	July 27	@ Tigers	0–10	Max Scherzer (15–1)	**Raúl Valdés** (1–1)	None	41,970	49–55
105	July 28	@ Tigers	4–12	Rick Porcello (8–6)	**Jake Diekman** (0–1)	None	41,326	49–56
106	July 30	Giants	7–3	**John Lannan** (3–4)	Barry Zito (4–8)	None	36,492	50–56
107	July 31	Giants	2–9	Chad Gaudin (5–2)	**Kyle Kendrick** (9–8)	None	34,067	50–57

August (12–17)

#	Date	Opponent	Score	Win	Loss	Save	Attendance	Record
108	August 1	Giants	1–2	Matt Cain (7–6)	**Jonathan Papelbon** (2–1)	Sergio Romo (25)	33,645	50–58
109	August 2	Braves	4–6	Kris Medlen (8–10)	**Ethan Martin** (0–1)	Craig Kimbrel (32)	35,087	50–59
110	August 3	Braves	4–5 (12)	Luis Avilán (4–0)	**Jake Diekman** (0–2)	Craig Kimbrel (33)	41,161	50–60
111	August 4	Braves	1–4	Alex Wood (2–2)	**Cliff Lee** (10–5)	Craig Kimbrel (34)	37,235	50–61
112	August 6	Cubs	9–8	**Kyle Kendrick** (10–8)	Edwin Jackson (7–12)	None	36,841	51–61
113	August 7	Cubs	2–5	Pedro Strop (2–4)	**Luis García** (0–1)	Kevin Gregg (23)	36,171	51–62
114	August 8	Cubs	12–1	**Ethan Martin** (1–1)	Jeff Samardzija (6–11)	None	42,510	52–62
115	August 9	@ Nationals	2–9	Dan Haren (7–11)	**John Lannan** (3–5)	None	27,831	52–63
116	August 10	@ Nationals	5–8	Tanner Roark (1–0)	**Jake Diekman** (0–3)	Rafael Soriano (29)	32,676	52–64
117	August 11	@ Nationals	0–6	Stephen Strasburg (6–9)	**Kyle Kendrick** (10–9)	None	32,355	52–65
118	August 12	@ Braves	5–1	**Cole Hamels** (5–13)	Julio Teherán (9–6)	None	20,676	53–65
119	August 13	@ Braves	1–3	Kris Medlen (10–10)	**Ethan Martin** (1–2)	Craig Kimbrel (37)	21,697	53–66
120	August 14	@ Braves	3–6	Brandon Beachy (2–0)	**John Lannan** (3–6)	Craig Kimbrel (38)	18,638	53–67
121	August 16	Dodgers	0–4	Zack Greinke (11–3)	**Cliff Lee** (10–6)	None	36,964	53–68
122	August 17	Dodgers	0–5	Clayton Kershaw (12–7)	**Kyle Kendrick** (10–10)	None	42,082	53–69
123	August 18	Dodgers	3–2	**Jonathan Papelbon** (3–1)	Brandon League (6–4)	None	40,336	54–69
124	August 19	Rockies	5–4	**Ethan Martin** (2–2)	Jeff Manship (0–3)	**Jonathan Papelbon** (21)	35,269	55–69
125	August 20	Rockies	3–5	Jorge de la Rosa (13–6)	**Tyler Cloyd** (2–3)	Rafael Betancourt (16)	34,018	55–70
126	August 21	Rockies	4–3	**Jake Diekman** (1–3)	Rafael Betancourt (2–4)	None	36,578	56–70
127	August 22	Rockies	5–4	**César Jiménez** (1–0)	Rafael Betancourt (2–5)	None	31,619	57–70
128	August 23	Diamondbacks	4–3	**Jonathan Papelbon** (4–1)	Heath Bell (4–2)	None	32,619	58–70
129	August 24	Diamondbacks	7–12 (18)	Trevor Cahill (5–10)	**Casper Wells** (0–1)	None	34,637	58–71
130	August 25	Diamondbacks	9–5	**Roy Halladay** (3–4)	Patrick Corbin (13–4)	None	36,128	59–71
131	August 26	@ Mets	2–1	**Cliff Lee** (11–6)	Zack Wheeler (6–3)	**Jonathan Papelbon** (22)	25,784	60–71
132	August 27	@ Mets	0–5	Jon Niese (6–6)	**Kyle Kendrick** (10–11)	None	25,700	60–72
133	August 28	@ Mets	6–2	**Cole Hamels** (6–13)	Daisuke Matsuzaka (0–2)	None	24,447	61–72
134	August 29	@ Mets	3–11	Carlos Torres (3–2)	**Ethan Martin** (2–3)	None	22,008	61–73
135	August 30	@ Cubs	6–5	**B. J. Rosenberg** (1–0)	Kevin Gregg (2–4)	**Jonathan Papelbon** (23)	27,763	62–73
136	August 31	@ Cubs	3–4	Carlos Villanueva (3–8)	**Zach Miner** (0–1)	Kevin Gregg (28)	36,410	62–74

September (11–15)

#	Date	Opponent	Score	Win	Loss	Save	Attendance	Record
137	September 1	@ Cubs	1–7	Jake Arrieta (3–3)	**Kyle Kendrick** (10–12)	None	31,859	62–75
138	September 2	Nationals	3–2	**B. J. Rosenberg** (2–0)	Tyler Clippard (6–3)	**Jonathan Papelbon** (24)	30,248	63–75
139	September 3	Nationals	6–9	Gio González (9–6)	**Ethan Martin** (2–4)	Rafael Soriano (37)	28,826	63–76
140	September 4	Nationals	2–3	Jordan Zimmermann (16–8)	**Jake Diekman** (1–4)	Rafael Soriano (38)	31,495	63–77
141	September 6	Braves	2–1	**Cliff Lee** (12–6)	Mike Minor (13–6)	**Jonathan Papelbon** (25)	37,088	64–77
142	September 7	Braves	6–5	**Jonathan Papelbon** (5–1)	Freddy García (3–6)	None	36,330	65–77
143	September 8	Braves	3–2	**Cole Hamels** (7–13)	David Carpenter (3–1)	**B. J. Rosenberg** (1)	38,706	66–77
144	September 10	Padres	2–8	Andrew Cashner (9–8)	**Tyler Cloyd** (2–4)	None	29,242	66–78
145	September 11	Padres	4–2	**Cliff Lee** (13–6)	Nick Vincent (4–3)	**Jonathan Papelbon** (26)	30,351	67–78
146	September 12	Padres	10–5	**Justin De Fratus** (3–3)	Tyson Ross (3–8)	None	29,986	68–78
147	September 13	@ Nationals	1–6	Ross Ohlendorf (4–0)	**Kyle Kendrick** (10–13)	None	31,325	68–79
148	September 14	@ Nationals	5–4	**Cole Hamels** (8–13)	Gio González (10–7)	**Jonathan Papelbon** (27)	33,972	69–79
149	September 15	@ Nationals	2–11	Jordan Zimmermann (18–8)	**Tyler Cloyd** (2–5)	None	33,746	69–80
150	September 16	Marlins	12–2	**Cliff Lee** (14–6)	Sam Dyson (0–1)	None	31,266	70–80
151	September 17	Marlins	6–4	**Roy Halladay** (4–4)	Brian Flynn (0–2)	**Jonathan Papelbon** (28)	28,872	71–80
152	September 18	Marlins	3–4 (10)	Brad Hand (1–1)	**César Jiménez** (1–1)	Steve Cishek (31)	28,908	71–81
153	September 20	Mets	4–6	Daisuke Matsuzaka (2–3)	**Cole Hamels** (8–14)	LaTroy Hawkins (11)	33,117	71–82
154	September 21	Mets	4–5 (7)	Dillon Gee (12–10)	**Tyler Cloyd** (2–6)	None	36,650	71–83
155	September 22	Mets	3–4	Carlos Torres (4–5)	**Cliff Lee** (14–7)	LaTroy Hawkins (12)	44,398	71–84
156	September 23	@ Marlins	0–4	Nathan Eovaldi (4–6)	**Roy Halladay** (4–5)	None	18,627	71–85
157	September 24	@ Marlins	2–1	**Michael Stutes** (3–1)	Henderson Álvarez (4–6)	**Jonathan Papelbon** (29)	19,375	72–85
158	September 25	@ Marlins	2–3	Chad Qualls (5–2)	**Ethan Martin** (2–5)	Steve Cishek (33)	19,180	72–86
159	September 26	@ Braves	1–7	David Hale (1–0)	**Tyler Cloyd** (2–7)	None	27,858	72–87
160	September 27	@ Braves	0–1	Kris Medlen (15–12)	**Cliff Lee** (14–8)	Craig Kimbrel (50)	38,711	72–88
161	September 28	@ Braves	5–4	**Luis García** (1–1)	Mike Minor (13–9)	None	38,171	73–88
162	September 29	@ Braves	5–12	Julio Teherán (14–8)	**Zach Miner** (0–2)	None	42,194	73–89

^{^[a]}The game was suspended at 0–0 during the middle of the ninth inning due to heavy rain, and continued at 5:30 p.m. on April 17, prior to the start of the game scheduled for that day.

== Roster ==
All players who made an appearance for the Phillies during 2013 are included.

2013 Philadelphia Phillies
Roster
Pitchers: 37 Mike Adams; 48 Phillippe Aumont; 59 Antonio Bastardo; 50 Tyler Cloyd; 79 Justin De Fratus; 63 Jake Diekman; 45 Chad Durbin; 57 Luis García; 34 Roy Halladay; 35 Cole Hamels; 47 Jeremy Horst; 56 César Jiménez; 38 Kyle Kendrick; 27 John Lannan; 33 Cliff Lee; 49 Ethan Martin; 45 Zach Miner; 58 Jonathan Papelbon; 44 Jonathan Pettibone; 66 J. C. Ramírez; 67 Mauricio Robles; 53 B. J. Rosenberg; 55 Joe Savery; 40 Michael Stutes; 46 Raúl Valdés	Catchers: 31 Erik Kratz; 39 Steven Lerud; 12 Humberto Quintero; 51 Carlos Ruiz; 29 Cameron Rupp; Infielders: 25 Cody Asche; 28 Kevin Frandsen; 13 Freddy Galvis; 6 Ryan Howard; 4 John McDonald; 12 Pete Orr; 11 Jimmy Rollins; 26 Chase Utley; 10 Michael Young	Outfielders: 3 Roger Bernadina; 9 Domonic Brown; 16 Ezequiel Carrera; 16 César Hernández; 7 Michael Martínez; 15 John Mayberry, Jr.; 19 Laynce Nix; 2 Ben Revere; 18 Darin Ruf; 43 Steve Susdorf; 22 Casper Wells; 3 Delmon Young	Manager: 41 Charlie Manuel; 23 Ryne Sandberg; Coaches: 17 Mick Billmeyer (catching); 30 Rich Dubee (pitching); 5 Steve Henderson (hitting); 21 Wally Joyner (assistant hitting) (first base); 54 Rod Nichols (bullpen); 23 Ryne Sandberg (third base); 8 Juan Samuel (first base)(third base); 81 Jesús Tiamo (bullpen catcher)

== Player stats ==
=== Batting ===
Note: G = Games played; AB = At bats; R = Runs; H = Hits; 2B = Doubles; 3B = Triples; HR = Home runs; RBI = Runs batted in; SB = Stolen bases; BB = Walks; AVG = Batting average; SLG = Slugging average

Player	G	AB	R	H	2B	3B	HR	RBI	SB	BB	AVG	SLG
Jimmy Rollins	160	600	65	151	36	2	6	39	22	59	.252	.348
Domonic Brown	139	496	65	135	21	4	27	83	8	39	.272	.494
Chase Utley	131	476	73	135	25	6	18	69	8	45	.284	.475
Michael Young	126	408	49	129	24	4	8	42	1	42	.276	.395
John Mayberry Jr.	134	353	47	80	23	1	11	39	5	27	.227	.391
Ben Revere	88	315	37	96	9	3	0	17	22	16	.305	.352
Carlos Ruiz	92	310	30	83	16	0	5	37	1	18	.268	.368
Ryan Howard	80	286	34	76	20	2	11	43	0	23	.266	.465
Delmon Young	80	272	22	71	13	0	8	31	0	14	.261	.397
Kevin Frandsen	119	252	27	59	10	1	5	26	1	12	.234	.341
Darin Ruf	73	251	36	62	11	0	14	30	0	33	.247	.458
Freddy Galvis	70	205	13	48	5	4	6	19	1	13	.234	.385
Erik Kratz	68	197	21	42	7	0	9	26	0	18	.213	.386
Cody Asche	50	162	18	38	8	1	5	22	1	15	.235	.389
Laynce Nix	81	128	11	23	4	0	2	7	1	8	.180	.258
César Hernández	34	121	17	35	5	0	0	10	0	9	.289	.331
Roger Bernadina	27	75	8	14	4	1	2	5	1	4	.187	.347
Humberto Quintero	24	64	3	16	4	0	2	9	0	3	.250	.406
Michael Martínez	29	40	5	7	0	0	0	3	1	0	.175	.175
Casper Wells	12	24	2	1	1	0	0	0	0	2	.042	.083
John McDonald	21	23	5	4	0	0	1	3	0	1	.174	.304
Pete Orr	15	20	1	4	0	0	0	0	0	2	.200	.200
Ezequiel Carrera	13	13	2	1	0	0	0	0	0	1	.077	.077
Cameron Rupp	4	13	1	4	1	0	0	2	0	1	.308	.385
Steve Susdorf	3	7	1	1	1	0	0	0	0	0	.143	.286
Steven Lerud	6	5	0	0	0	0	0	0	0	0	.000	.000
Pitcher totals	162	280	17	40	7	3	0	16	0	12	.143	.189
Team totals	162	5456	610	1355	255	32	140	578	73	417	.248	.384

=== Pitching ===
Note: W = Wins; L = Losses; ERA = Earned run average; G = Games pitched; GS = Games started; SV = Saves; IP = Innings pitched; H = Hits allowed; R = Runs allowed; ER = Earned runs allowed; BB = Walks allowed; SO = Strikeouts

Player	W	L	ERA	G	GS	SV	IP	H	R	ER	BB	SO
Cliff Lee	14	8	2.87	31	31	0	222.2	193	77	71	32	222
Cole Hamels	8	14	3.60	33	33	0	220.0	205	94	88	50	202
Kyle Kendrick	10	13	4.70	30	30	0	182.0	207	104	95	47	110
Jonathan Pettibone	5	4	4.04	18	18	0	100.1	109	50	45	38	66
John Lannan	3	6	5.33	14	14	0	74.1	86	48	44	27	38
Roy Halladay	4	5	6.82	13	13	0	62.0	55	48	47	36	51
Jonathan Papelbon	5	1	2.92	61	0	29	61.2	59	23	20	11	57
Tyler Cloyd	2	7	6.56	13	11	0	60.1	83	45	44	25	41
Justin De Fratus	3	3	3.86	58	0	0	46.2	45	21	20	25	42
Antonio Bastardo	3	2	2.32	48	0	2	42.2	33	12	11	21	47
Ethan Martin	2	5	6.08	15	8	0	40.0	42	27	27	26	47
Jake Diekman	1	4	2.58	45	0	0	38.1	34	15	11	16	41
Raúl Valdés	1	1	7.46	17	1	0	35.0	42	29	29	8	37
Luis García	1	1	3.73	24	0	0	31.1	27	15	13	23	23
Zach Miner	0	2	4.40	16	3	0	28.2	33	14	14	17	20
Jeremy Horst	0	2	6.23	28	0	0	26.0	35	19	18	12	21
Mike Adams	1	4	3.96	28	0	0	25.0	23	11	11	11	23
J. C. Ramírez	0	1	7.50	18	0	0	24.0	30	22	20	15	16
Joe Savery	2	0	3.15	18	0	0	20.0	15	11	7	11	14
B.J. Rosenberg	2	0	4.58	22	0	1	19.2	20	10	10	9	19
Phillippe Aumont	1	3	4.19	22	0	0	19.1	24	11	9	13	19
Michael Stutes	3	1	4.58	16	0	0	17.2	14	11	9	8	9
César Jiménez	1	1	3.71	19	0	0	17.0	14	7	7	10	11
Chad Durbin	1	0	9.00	16	0	0	16.0	25	17	16	9	16
Mauricio Robles	0	0	1.93	3	0	0	4.2	7	3	1	3	6
Casper Wells	0	1	67.50	1	0	0	0.2	3	5	5	3	0
John McDonald	0	0	0.00	1	0	0	0.1	2	0	0	0	1
Team totals	73	89	4.32	162	162	32	1436.1	1465	749	689	506	1199

== Farm system ==
Level	Team	League	Manager
AAA	Lehigh Valley IronPigs	International League	Dave Brundage
AA	Reading Fightin Phils	Eastern League	Dusty Wathan
A	Clearwater Threshers	Florida State League	Chris Truby
A	Lakewood BlueClaws	South Atlantic League	Mickey Morandini
A-Short Season	Williamsport Crosscutters	New York–Penn League	Nelson Prada
Rookie	GCL Phillies	Gulf Coast League	Roly de Armas
