= Jonathan Pettibone =

American baseball player (born 1990)

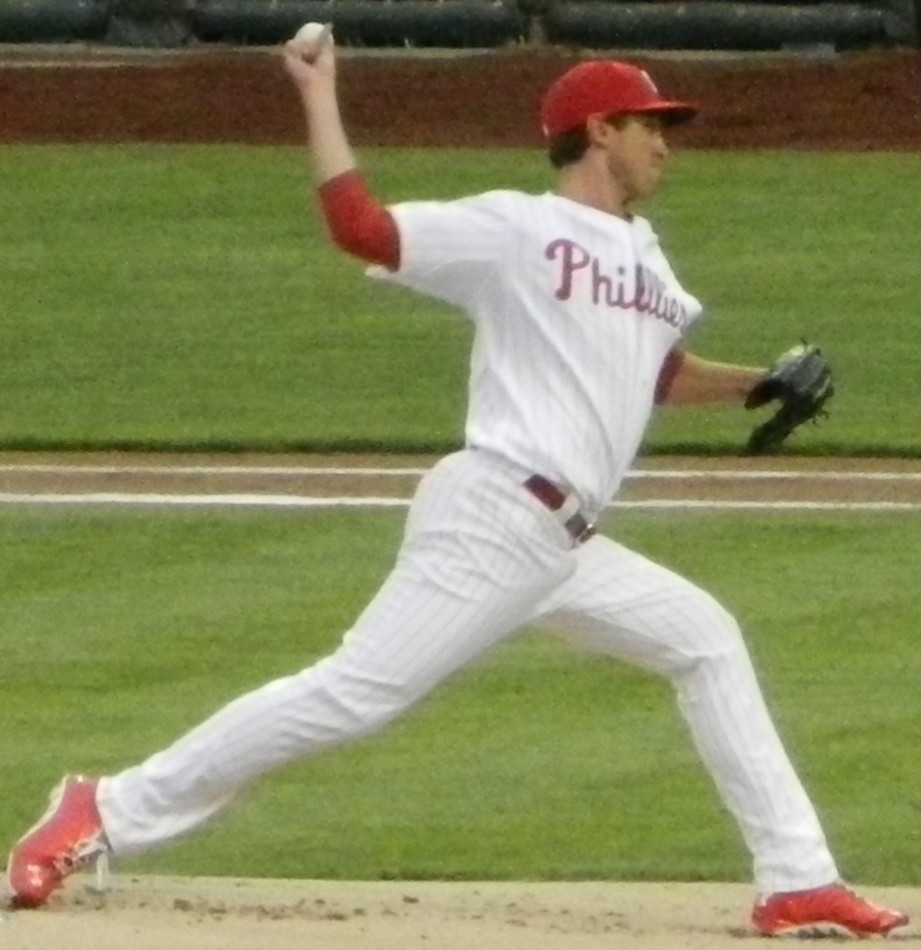
- Pettibone pitching on his Major League debut game
- Starting pitcher
- Born: July 19, 1990 (age 36); Yorba Linda, California, U.S.
- Batted: Left Threw: Right

MLB debut
- April 22, 2013, for the Philadelphia Phillies

Last MLB appearance
- April 18, 2014, for the Philadelphia Phillies

MLB statistics
- Win–loss record: 5–5
- Earned run average: 4.45
- Strikeouts: 72
- Stats at Baseball Reference

Teams
- Philadelphia Phillies (2013–2014)

Harry Jonathan Pettibone (born July 19, 1990) is an American former professional baseball pitcher. He played in Major League Baseball (MLB) for the Philadelphia Phillies. His father, Jay, was a starting pitcher for the Minnesota Twins.

After signing with the Phillies in 2008, Pettibone methodically progressed through their farm system, generally spending about one season at each level until 2012, when he advanced to the Triple-A Lehigh Valley IronPigs after having spent the majority of that season with the Double-A Reading Fightin Phils. Early in 2013, the Phillies promoted him to the major league club, and he made 18 starts with the Phillies before inflaming his rotator cuff, for which the Phillies precautionarily did not use him for the remainder of the season. Pettibone began the 2014 season competing for a spot in the back of the Phillies starting rotation, making two starts, but was ineffective, and was sent back to the minor leagues, where he sustained a SLAP tear, and was placed on the disabled list.

== Early life ==
Pettibone was born July 19, 1990, in Placentia, California, and grew up predominantly in Yorba Linda, California. He has two siblings; his father, Jay, played six seasons of professional baseball, including four appearances with the Minnesota Twins. The younger Pettibone attended Esperanza High School in Anaheim, California, and played baseball and basketball there prior to graduating in 2008. After graduation, he planned to play college baseball for the University of Southern California Trojans; however, the Phillies subsequently drafted Pettibone, leaving him to decide between playing college or professional baseball. In an effort to sway him to join the Phillies, scout Darrell Conner had Phillies pitchers Cole Hamels and Kyle Kendrick call Pettibone to share their experiences in deciding when to sign a professional contract, and ultimately, Pettibone agreed to a contract with the Phillies that included a US$500,000 signing bonus.

== Professional career ==
=== Minor leagues (2008–2012) ===
Pettibone was selected in the third round (110th overall) of the 2008 Major League Baseball draft by the Philadelphia Phillies. That year, he started his professional career as a member of the Gulf Coast League Phillies, with whom he made only one appearance, allowing two unearned runs in one inning, and thus receiving the loss. At the conclusion of the season, he participated in the Florida Instructional League (FIL). In 2009, he played for the Williamsport Crosscutters of the New York–Penn League (Single-A short season). In June, he made three starts and compiled an 0.56 earned run average (ERA) in them, which helped him earn NY-Penn player of the week honors for June 22–28. Overall, he went 2–4 in nine games (eight starts) with a 5.35 ERA and thirty-six strikeouts in 35 1/3 innings, and again participated in the FIL at the end of the season.

Pettibone's steady advancement through the minor league system continued in 2010, when he pitched with the Lakewood BlueClaws of the South Atlantic League (Single-A). With Lakewood, he allowed three or fewer earned runs in all but four of his 23 starts, and had a particularly strong second half of the season, posting a 2.41 ERA. Cumulatively, Pettibone finished ninth in the league with a 3.49 ERA, posted a win–loss record of 8–6, and threw a total of 131 1/3 innings. He pitched for the Clearwater Threshers of the Florida State League (Single-A advanced) the next year, and had a strong season, leading the league in innings pitched (161 1/3, tying for second place in starts (27), and finishing with the fifth-best ERA (2.96). Pettibone also was named a league all star, and the Phillies' minor league pitcher of the week in late April. At the conclusion of the season, Baseball America rated him the Phillies' fourth-best prospect. Pettibone split 2012 between the Double-A Reading Fightin Phils (Eastern League) and the Triple-A Lehigh Valley IronPigs (International League), earning a promotion to the latter in July. He posted an aggregate ERA of 3.10, to complement his 13–8 record in 159 2/3 innings pitched. Again, Baseball America ranked Pettibone as the Phillies' fourth-best prospect at the conclusion of the season, his last spent solely in the minor leagues.

=== Philadelphia Phillies (2013–2014) ===
==== 2013 season ====
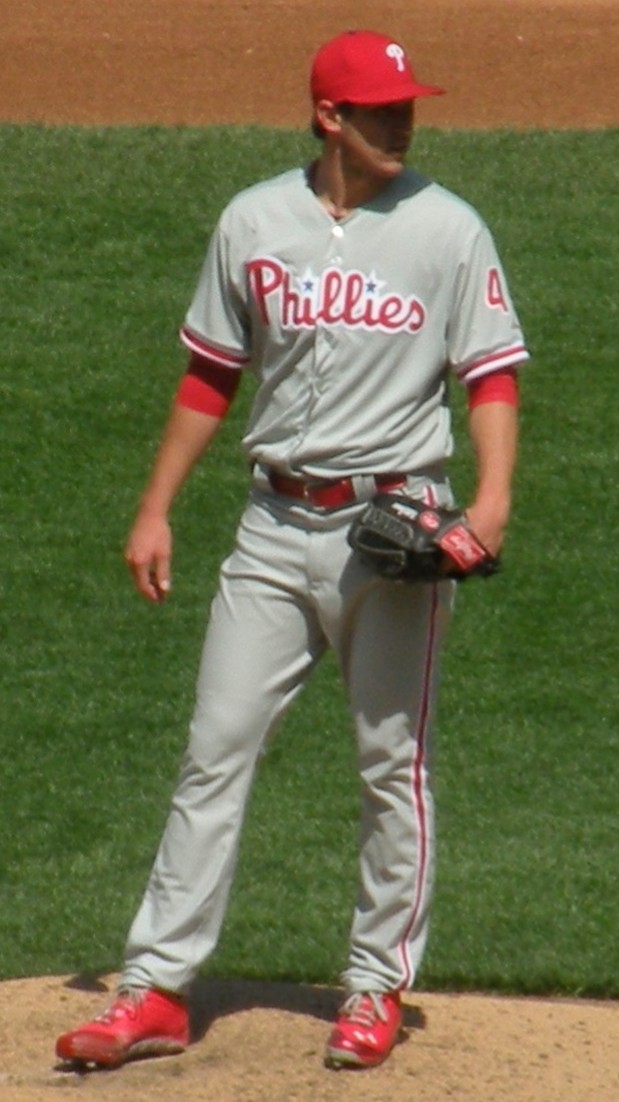
Pettibone pitching for the Philadelphia Phillies in 2013

Entering the Phillies' 2013 season, despite Pettibone's quick ascension through the minor leagues and strong performance late in 2012 for the Triple-A IronPigs, he was considered to be behind Tyler Cloyd, Adam Morgan, and Ethan Martin on the organizational depth chart for starting pitchers. Pettibone began the year with Lehigh Valley, and despite a 7.71 ERA in his first three starts, the Phillies called him up to make his major league debut, admittedly "sooner than ... anticipated", according to Pettibone. He made that debut on April 22, 2013, starting for the Phillies at Citizens Bank Park against the Pittsburgh Pirates, pitching 5 1/3 innings, striking out six, while reaching base on a walk and scoring a run for Philadelphia; he earned a no decision in the Phillies' 3–2 defeat of the Pittsburgh Pirates. He remained in the starting rotation for the next several months, but in July, the Phillies ended his season due to an inflamed rotator cuff. In total, his numbers were commensurate with those he posted in the minor leagues – 18 starts, 5–4 record, 4.04 ERA, 100 1/3 innings pitched.

==== 2014 season ====
Although to remain a viable candidate to pitch in the Phillies rotation he needed to regain complete health, Pettibone began the 2014 Phillies season's spring training with more shoulder discomfort. Although the issue was not structural according to an MRI, it was disconcerting to the Phillies, as he was a young pitcher. Ultimately, the discomfort kept him from remaining a competitor for a spot in the back of the Phillies' rotation, and he began the season in the minor leagues. However, he was the first pitcher to be called up from the minor leagues to make a start for the Phillies in 2014, serving as a spot starter while Cole Hamels recovered from injury. He made two starts before being demoted back to the minor leagues. His injury woes subsequently continued; he was diagnosed with a SLAP tear, and though he declined surgery, he received a cortisone injection and was placed on the disabled list to rest. Todd Zolecki, the Phillies beat writer for MLB.com, noted, "Pettibone’s shoulder is a legitimate concern because this is the third time he has had to stop pitching in less than a year because of it. He finished last season on the disabled list before falling behind schedule in Spring Training because of shoulder pain." On June 18, 2014, he underwent season-ending surgery performed by Dr. James Andrews to repair his SLAP tear.

==== 2015 season ====
Pettibone began the 2015 season on the 15-day disabled list to continue recovery from his shoulder surgery. Spending the whole year on the disabled list, Pettibone was activated on October 7; he was subsequently removed from the 40–man roster and sent outright to Triple–A Lehigh Valley. He elected free agency on November 6.

=== Chicago Cubs ===
On January 28, 2016, Pettibone signed a minor league contract with the Chicago Cubs. An invitation to spring training was also included. He was released without appearing for the organization on April 19.

=== New Britain Bees ===
On March 24, 2017, Pettibone signed with the New Britain Bees of the Atlantic League of Professional Baseball. He made 23 starts for the Bees, posting a 2–8 record and 5.35 ERA with 63 strikeouts across 102 2/3 innings pitched.

Pettibone made 2 starts for New Britain in 2018, struggling to an 0–1 record and 8.10 ERA with 2 strikeouts over 6 2/3 innings of work. He was released by the Bees on May 10, 2018.

== Scouting report ==
Although Pettibone was not projected to have the highest potential of any Phillies pitching prospect, some talent evaluators thought he had the highest floor (i.e., the worst-case scenario in terms of his development), and these evaluations were confirmed by his rookie season. As such, he projected to be a decent back-of-the-rotation starter. He throws three pitches, including a fastball that, while predominantly around 90 miles per hour (140 km/h), can reach 95 miles per hour (153 km/h). Secondarily, he throws a changeup, which Eric Longenhagen called his "best offering" because it "features good fade and arm speed." When he first reached the major leagues, scouts thought he threw either curveball and slider, but upon reaching the major leagues, they determined he threw both a slider and a cutter, which move similarly and can "induce weak contact and maybe miss some bats if it's thrown in the right spot." Ultimately, Pettibone's long-term effectiveness hinges on whether he could remain healthy.

== See also ==
- List of second-generation Major League Baseball players
