= Steve Susdorf =

American baseball player (born 1986)

- Outfielder
- Born: March 28, 1986 (age 40); Santa Clarita, California, U.S.
- Batted: Left Threw: Left

MLB debut
- July 25, 2013, for the Philadelphia Phillies

Last appearance
- July 28, 2013, for the Philadelphia Phillies

MLB statistics
- Batting average: .143
- Hits: 1
- Home runs: 0
- Runs batted in: 0
- Stats at Baseball Reference

Teams
- Philadelphia Phillies (2013)

Stephen James Susdorf (born March 28, 1986), is an American former professional baseball outfielder, who played in Major League Baseball (MLB) for the Philadelphia Phillies briefly, in 2013. He batted and threw left-handed.

== Career ==
=== Minor League career ===
Susdorf was drafted in the 27th round of the 2007 MLB draft by the Detroit Tigers, but he did not sign, instead returning to Fresno State for his senior season. The 2008 Fresno State Bulldogs won the College World Series, and Susdorf was drafted in the 19th round of the 2008 MLB draft by the Philadelphia Phillies. Susdorf was assigned to Short Season Williamsport, but also played 2 games for Single-A Lakewood. In 50 total games, he hit .295 with 5 HR and 35 RBI.

Susdorf began 2009 with Lakewood, but after about a month, he was promoted to A-Advanced Clearwater. After a month and a half with Clearwater, he was promoted to the Double-A Reading Phillies. In 85 total games, he hit .324 with 7 HR and 44 RBI. After the season, Susdorf played with the Scottsdale Scorpions of the Arizona Fall League.

Susdorf spent 2010 with Clearwater, where in 128 games, he hit .278 with 11 HR and 77 RBI. Susdorf began the 2011 season with Reading, but his season came to a close at the end of July, after he dislocated his left shoulder and later required surgery to repair his right knee while trying to beat a grounder. Susdorf began the 2012 season with Reading, but was promoted to the Triple-A Lehigh Valley IronPigs in mid-May. In 117 total games, he hit .286 with 2 HR and 41 RBI.

Susdorf began the 2013 season with Lehigh Valley, but after 70 games, he was promoted to Philadelphia. At the time, he was hitting .335 with 1 HR and 25 RBI and 8 SB.

=== Major League career ===
==== Philadelphia Phillies ====
On July 25, 2013, Susdorf was called up by the Phillies to replace Domonic Brown, who was placed on the 7-day disabled list with a concussion. He made his major league debut that day as a pinch-hitter, grounding into a double play. His first hit, a double off Rick Porcello of the Detroit Tigers, came in his first start. On July 30, Susdorf was designated for assignment to make room for Cody Asche. On July 10, 2014, the Phillies released him from their Triple–A affiliate.
