= Kris Medlen =

American baseball player (born 1985)

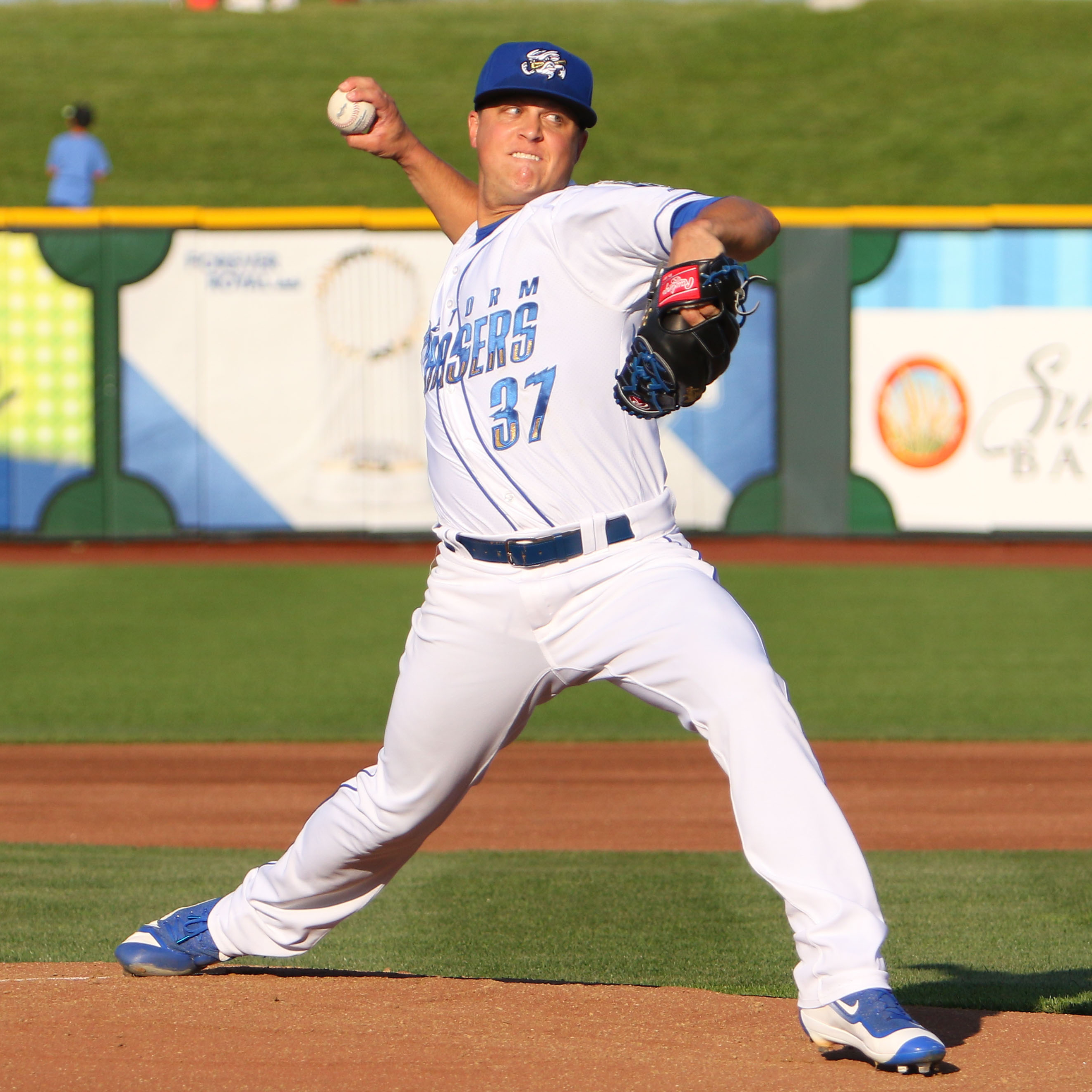
- Medlen with the Omaha Storm Chasers in 2016
- Pitcher
- Born: October 7, 1985 (age 41); Artesia, California, U.S.
- Batted: Switch Threw: Right

MLB debut
- May 21, 2009, for the Atlanta Braves

Last MLB appearance
- May 4, 2018, for the Arizona Diamondbacks

MLB statistics
- Win–loss record: 41–26
- Earned run average: 3.33
- Strikeouts: 496
- Stats at Baseball Reference

Teams
- Atlanta Braves (2009–2013); Kansas City Royals (2015–2016); Arizona Diamondbacks (2018)

Career highlights and awards
- World Series champion (2015)

Kristopher Allen Medlen (born October 7, 1985) is an American former professional baseball pitcher. He played in Major League Baseball (MLB) for the Atlanta Braves, Kansas City Royals and Arizona Diamondbacks. As of 2023, Medlen works for Bally Sports South where he serves as an on-air analyst for Atlanta Braves baseball telecasts.

== College ==
Medlen graduated from Gahr High School in Cerritos, California in 2003. He attended El Camino College his freshman year and hit .296 with 18 RBI's as an infielder. As a pitcher, Medlen posted a 2.84 ERA with 17 K's in 19 innings of work, leading the team with 4 saves. Medlen redshirted the next year, before transferring to Santa Ana College.

At Santa Ana, Medlen played as the starting shortstop and hit .332 with 10 HR's and 42 RBI. He also served as the team's closer, posting a 2.23 ERA with 16 saves, striking out 57 in 44.1 innings pitched.

== Professional career ==
=== Atlanta Braves ===
==== 2006 Draft ====
Medlen was drafted by the Atlanta Braves in the 10th round of the 2006 Major League Baseball draft. The Braves saw promise for Medlen as a relief pitcher, and drafted him with the intention of using him in the bullpen.

=== Minor league career ===
Medlen played his first professional baseball game on June 22, 2006, for the Danville Braves of the Appalachian League. He appeared in 20 games for Danville, and pitched a total of 22 innings, being credited with 1 win, no losses, and 10 saves. In those 22 innings, Medlen allowed 14 hits and only 1 earned run. He struck out 36 batters, and allowed only 2 walks. His ERA was 0.41 and his WHIP was 0.727.

Medlen played for three of the Braves minor league teams during 2007, progressing from the Rome Braves (single A, South Atlantic League), to the Myrtle Beach Pelicans (high A, Carolina League) and ending the season with the Mississippi Braves (AA, Southern League).

His statistics for these three teams were as follows: For the Rome Braves, Medlen appeared in 17 games, logging 20.2 innings, with 33 strike-outs and 3 walks; he had an ERA of 0.87 and a WHIP of 0.774. For the Myrtle Beach Braves, Medlen appeared in 18 games, pitching 24 innings, with 28 strike-outs and 9 walks (2 of them intentional); he had an ERA of 1.12 and a WHIP of 1.230. For the Mississippi Braves, Medlen appeared in only 3 games, for a total of 2.1 innings. He had 2 strike-outs and 2 walks, allowing 4 hits and 3 earned runs (for an ERA of 11.57 and a WHIP of 2.571).

Medlen spent the entire 2008 season with the Mississippi Braves of the Southern League. He made 19 relief appearances from April 5 to June 1, and got his first start on June 5, 2012, against the Mobile BayBears (an Arizona Diamondbacks affiliate). He recorded 10 strike-outs in two of his starts, in a 7.0 inning start against the Pensacola Blue Wahoos (on July 7, 2008), a game in which he allowed 4 hits and 1 walk, but also allowed 3 runs, and in a 6.0 inning start against the Carolina Mudcats (on August 22, 2008), a game in which he allowed 3 hits and 1 walk, but no runs. For the season, Medlen started 17 games, with 6 wins and 5 losses.

Medlen was named Southern League pitcher of the week on July 14, 2008, after the week in which he had 10 strike-outs against the Blue Wahoos and a win against the Chattanooga Lookouts, in which he allowed 5 hits, 1 walk and 1 run over 6 innings, while striking out 6 batters.

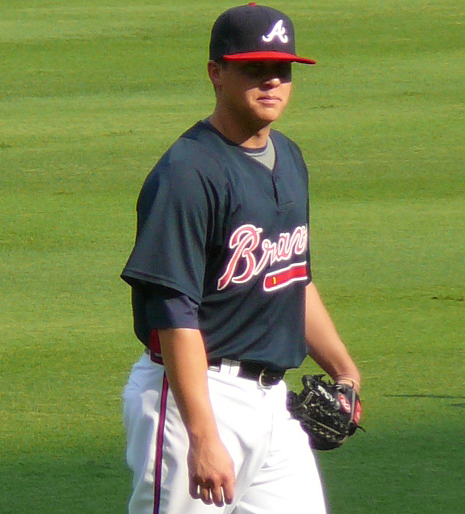
Medlen during his tenure with the Atlanta Braves in 2009

=== Major leagues ===
==== 2009 season ====
Medlen began his major league career as a starter, making his debut on May 21, 2009, pitching just 3.0 innings, giving up 5 earned runs on 3 hits against the Colorado Rockies. Medlen earned his first major league win on May 31, 2009, against the Arizona Diamondbacks pitching 6 innings and giving up only 1 earned run. Medlen went to the Braves bull pen, to make room for rookie starting pitcher Tommy Hanson, and Medlen made his first appearance as a relief pitcher on June 9, 2009, when he pitched scoreless 13th, 14th and 15th innings to get a win against the Pittsburgh Pirates. For the 2009 season, Medlen pitched a total of 67.2 innings, gave up 65 hits and 30 walks, while striking out 72. His record was 3 wins and 5 losses, with an ERA of 4.26.

==== 2010 season ====
On August 5, 2010, Medlen was placed on the 15-day disabled list with a partially torn ulnar collateral ligament tear in his right elbow. It was announced by the Atlanta Braves that he would require Tommy John surgery to repair the damage, ending his season.

==== 2011 season ====
Medlen spent much of the 2011 season rehabbing following the surgery. He was activated from the 60-day disabled list on September 24, 2011, and pitched in only two games.

==== 2012 season ====
Medlen began the 2012 major league season as a reliever for the Atlanta Braves, typically pitching middle innings before the Braves set-up man and closer came on for the 8th and 9th innings. He was sent down to the Braves AAA team (the Gwinnett Braves), for the purpose of "stretching him out" to return to the majors as a starter. He started only three games for the Gwinnett Braves, pitching 2.1, 5.0 and 6.0 innings and having a record of two losses and one "no decision". He returned to Atlanta on June 18, 2012, and made 16 appearances in relief, from June 18, 2012, through July 25, 2012.

Medlen got his first start of the 2012 season, on July 31, 2012, against the Miami Marlins, allowing 4 hits and 1 earned run and recording the win in a 7–1 game. After an August 5 "no decision" against the Houston Astros (which the Braves won by a 6–1 score), Medlen won five consecutive games in dominating style. On August 11, 2012, in a 9–3 win against the Mets at Citi Field, Medlen pitched 6.1 innings, allowing 5 hits and 1 walk, while striking out 7.

Medlen recorded his first complete game shut-out on August 16, 2012, with a 6–0 victory over the San Diego Padres, in which allowed 5 hits and struck out 6, allowing no walks. Perhaps the most important win of Medlen's professional career came on August 22, at Washington, with the Braves ending a four-game losing streak that had included two games against the Division-leading Nationals. Medlen pitched 7 innings, allowing 7 hits and 1 walk, while striking out 7. The win allowed the Braves to remain six games behind the Nationals. With the win over the Nationals, Medlen also broke a franchise record with the Braves winning the 16th consecutive game that Medlen had started. Medlen's fourth win in the month of August 2012 came at San Diego, on August 28, with Medlen pitching 8 shut-out innings. Medlen allowed 5 singles, but picked off two of these runners, and no runner moved beyond first base. He struck out 9 Padres, and allowed no walks. Once again, the win by Medlen allowed the Braves to avoid being swept in a three-game series. With this game, Medlen extended his streak of scoreless innings to 28-1/3.

On September 3, 2012, Medlen faced the Colorado Rockies at Turner Field, and got the win in dominant fashion. Medlen pitched a complete game, allowing five hits and no walks while striking out a career-best 12 batters. He threw 111 pitches, with 88 of them being strikes. Medlen's streak of consecutive scoreless innings came to an end (at 34 2/3 innings) in the 7th inning when Carlos Gonzalez scored on an error by Paul Janish. This was the longest streak of consecutive scoreless innings for a Braves pitcher since Greg Maddux in 2000.

On September 8, 2012, Medlen faced the New York Mets at Citi Field, and recorded his 8th win of the season. Medlen had completed 6 innings, allowing 4 hits and 2 earned runs, when the game was delayed because of rain. Medlen did not return after the 75-minute delay, but got credit for the win in the 11–3 victory for the Braves. When he allowed an earned run in the 4th inning, his streak of consecutive innings without an earned run ended at 40 1/3 innings. This streak had started at Citi Field on August 11. His streak of innings without allowing a home run ended at 53 innings, when Cedeno hit a home run in the 5th innings.

On September 14, 2012, Medlen got the start against the first-place Washington Nationals, at Turner Field, and pitched 7.0 innings, leaving with the score tied at 1–1. In his 7 innings, Medlen allowed 5 hits and 1 walk, while recording 13 strike-outs, a career high. The Braves went on to win the game 2–1, with a run in the bottom of the ninth, winning their 20th consecutive game that Medlen had started. This 20 game streak was a franchise record for the Braves and tied a major record set by the New York Yankees and Roger Clemens in 2001. Medlen had 8 called third strikes in the game, the most of any major league pitcher in 2012 and the most for any Braves pitcher since Greg Maddux in 2000.

On September 19, 2012, in Atlanta, Medlen pitched 8 scoreless innings, in a game that Atlanta won, 3–0. Medlen allowed 4 hits and 1 walk, while striking out 6 Marlins. In the 1st and 5th innings, Marlin runners reached third base with only one out, but a strike-out followed by a ground-out and a pop-out followed by a grounder preserved the scoreless game for Medlen. With this win, the Braves had won 21 consecutive games started by Medlen, the most in major league baseball since the Yankees won 22 consecutive games started by Whitey Ford from 1950 through 1953, a span interrupted by his service during the Korean War. On September 30, 2012, Medlen led the Braves to their 23rd consecutive victory in games that he started, as they beat the Mets, 6–2. Medlen pitched 6 Innings, allowing 3 hits, 1 walk and 1 unearned run, while striking out 4. This established a new major league record in that category, according to mlb.com.

Medlen started against the St. Louis Cardinals in the MLB's first ever single-game wild card playoff. Medlen pitched 6.1 innings and allowed 5 runs, only 2 earned, on 3 hits. He gave up a home run and was credited with the loss in this game. After Medlen's exit, the Braves' Andrelton Simmons hit an outfield fly on which left field umpire Sam Holbrook called an infield fly rule, causing a 19 minute delay as fans threw debris onto the field.

===== Honors =====
On September 4, 2012, Medlen was named National League "Pitcher of the Month" for August 2012. In an article discussing the award, Atlanta Journal-Constitution writer David O'Brien pointed out that many commentators have been comparing Kris Medlen to the Braves' legendary pitcher, Greg Maddux. Medlen repeated as National League "Pitcher of the Month" for September, becoming the first Braves pitcher to win this back-to-back since Greg Maddux, in June and July 2001.

==== 2013 season ====
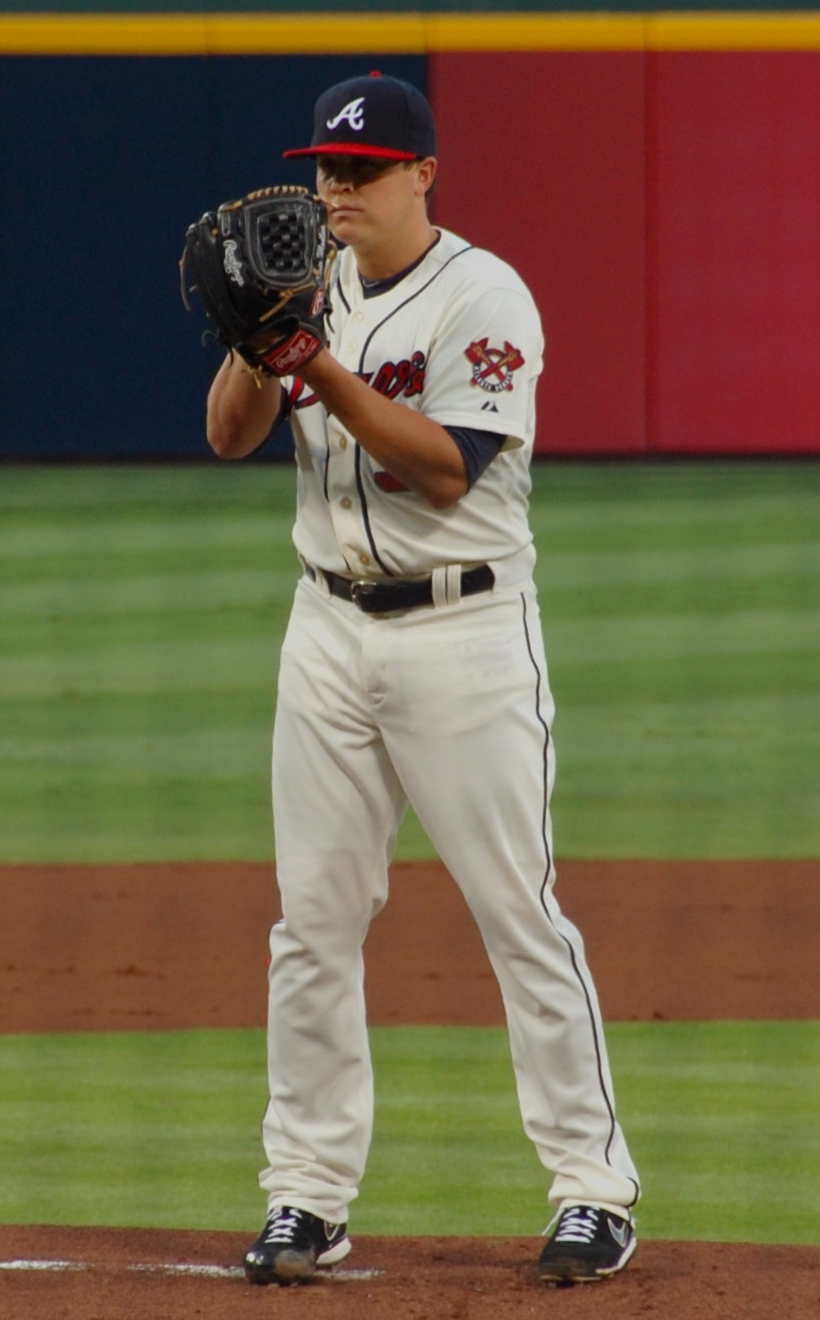
Medlen with the Atlanta Braves in 2013

On June 8, 2013, Medlen hit his first career home run. In 2013, he went 15–12 with a 3.11 ERA in 32 games (31 starts). In his only postseason appearance in 2013, he pitched 4 innings, and gave up 5 earned runs on 9 hits with a home run. He was credited with the loss, bringing his postseason win–loss record to 0–2.

==== 2014 season ====
On March 9, 2014, Medlen left a Spring training game due to a sore right elbow. The following day, he had MRIs which tested positive that there was ligament damage in the elbow. Trying to avoid surgery, he sought a second opinion with Dr. James Andrews. However, Dr. Andrews looked at Medlen's test results, and could only confirm Medlen's worst fears; Medlen needed a second Tommy John surgery, and as a result, Medlen missed the entire 2014 season.

Medlen became a free agent on December 2, 2014, after he was non-tendered by the Braves.

=== Kansas City Royals ===
On December 18, 2014, he signed a two-year deal (with a mutual option for a third year) with the Kansas City Royals for a guaranteed $8.5 million. He started the 2015 season on the 60-day disabled list to continue recovering from his second Tommy John surgery and made his first appearance for the Royals on July 20, 2015, against the Pirates. He made his first start for the Royals on Monday, August 24, 2015, against the Baltimore Orioles. He made 15 appearances (8 starts) in 2015 with a 6–2 record and a 4.01 ERA. He was also part of the Royals postseason run as the team won the 2015 World Series over the New York Mets, their first championship in 30 years.

On May 12, 2016, Medlen was placed on the 15-day disabled list due to right rotator cuff inflammation. The Royals declined Medlen's 2017 option on November 4, making him a free agent.

=== Atlanta Braves (second stint) ===
On January 24, 2017, Medlen signed a minor league contract with the Atlanta Braves. After not pitching a game in spring training, Medlen was released by the Braves. He re–signed with the team on a new minor league contract on April 1. In 20 starts split between the Triple–A Gwinnett Braves, Double–A Mississippi Braves, and High–A Florida Fire Frogs, Medlen accumulated a 5–8 record and 4.95 ERA with 98 strikeouts in 116 1/3 innings of work. He elected free agency following the season on November 6.

=== Arizona Diamondbacks ===
On January 22, 2018, Medlen signed a minor league contract with the Arizona Diamondbacks. He had his contract selected to the major league roster on May 4. After making just one start in the majors and pitching mostly for the Reno Aces, Medlen retired from professional baseball on May 27, 2018.

== Pitching style ==
Medlen mostly throws four pitches. He leads with a two-seam fastball in the 89–93 mph range, and he also has a four-seam fastball in that range. His off-speed pitches are a curveball (77–80) and changeup (80–83), which are used primarily against right-handers and left-handers, respectively. Lastly, Medlen throws a handful of sliders.

Medlen's highly effective changeup has a career whiff rate of 44%, among the highest rates for starting pitchers in the big leagues. Hitters in the 2012 season hit only .098 against the pitch.

== Personal ==
Medlen met his wife Nicki through former minor league teammate Ryne Reynoso, and married her in 2012. They have two children.

Medlen is a spokesman for the Rally Foundation.
