= Cody Asche =

American baseball player and coach (born 1990)

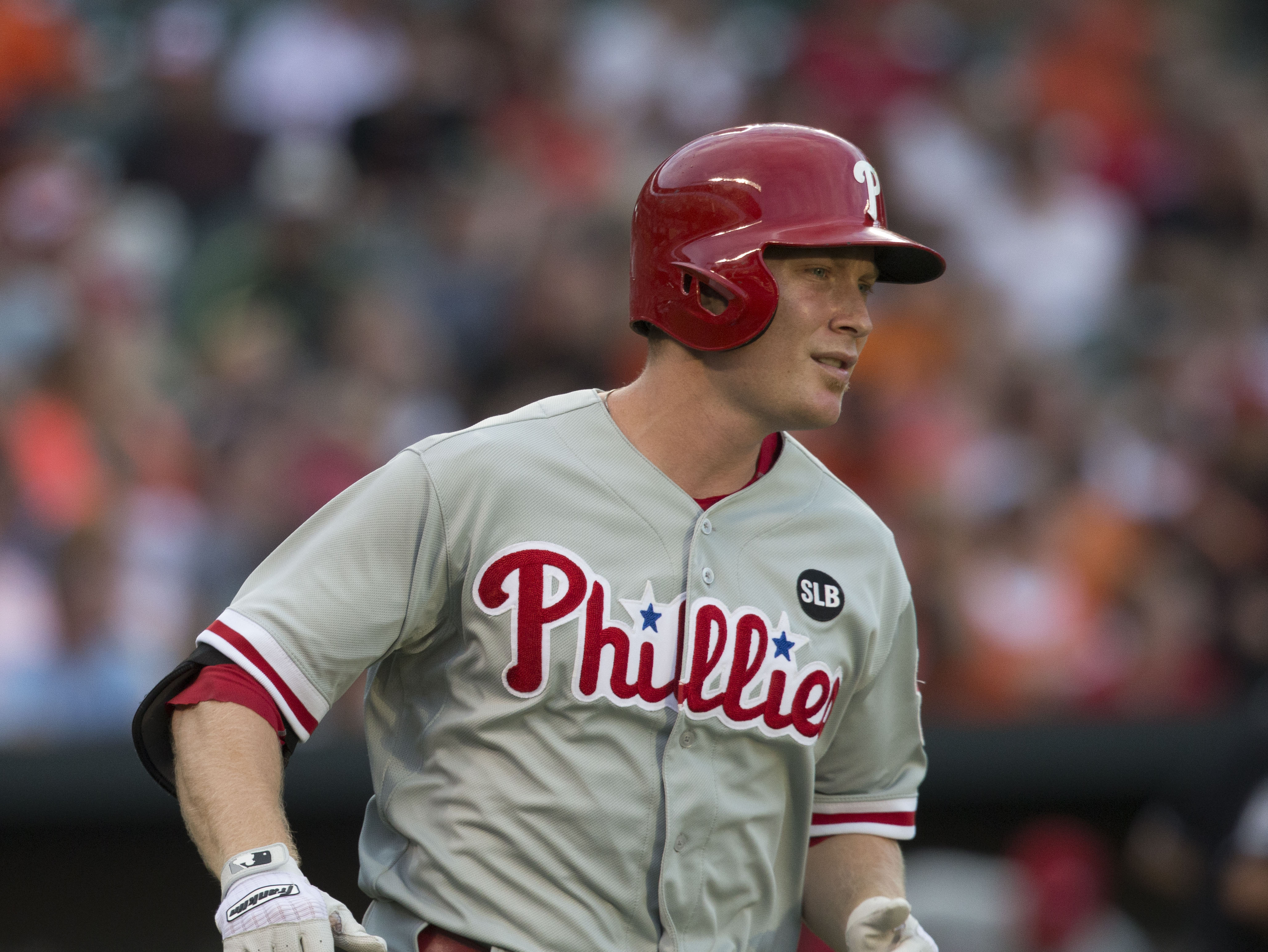
- Asche with the Phillies in 2015

Detroit Tigers – No. 92
- Coach
- Born: June 30, 1990 (age 36); St. Charles, Missouri, U.S.
- Batted: Left Threw: Right

MLB debut
- July 30, 2013, for the Philadelphia Phillies

Last MLB appearance
- May 12, 2017, for the Chicago White Sox

MLB statistics
- Batting average: .234
- Home runs: 32
- Runs batted in: 129
- Stats at Baseball Reference

Teams
- As player: Philadelphia Phillies (2013–2016); Chicago White Sox (2017); As coach: Baltimore Orioles (2023–2025); Detroit Tigers (2026–present)

Cody James Asche (/ˈæʃiː/ ASH-ee; born June 30, 1990) is an American former professional baseball player—as third baseman and left fielder—and coach who currently serves as the assistant hitting coach for the Detroit Tigers of Major League Baseball (MLB). He played in MLB for the Philadelphia Phillies and Chicago White Sox.

After growing up in O'Fallon, Missouri, Asche attended the University of Nebraska, where he played college baseball for the Nebraska Cornhuskers, majored in economics, and achieved recognition for both his athletic and academic performance.

His pro baseball career began when Asche was chosen as the fourth round selection of the Phillies in the 2011 draft. He quickly progressed through the minor league system, briefly dabbling at second base before predominantly sticking to third base and left field. At both positions, minor league scouts regarded his defensive ability as sub-optimal. His career with the Phillies ended in 2016, and he played one additional season in the Chicago White Sox organization before bouncing around several minor league organizations. Since 2022, he has worked as a coach with the Baltimore Orioles organization.

== Early life ==
Asche was born on June 30, 1990, in St. Charles, Missouri, to Todd and Julie Asche; he has a brother named Tyler. He grew up playing baseball, which he started playing with his father and brother in the yard around age five, and football, but he quit playing football in his freshman year of high school. He attended Fort Zumwalt West High School in O'Fallon, Missouri. Playing for the school's baseball team, he had a .425 batting average across his career and batted .512 in his senior season. He then enrolled at the University of Nebraska, where he played college baseball for the Nebraska Cornhuskers. In 2011, Asche's junior year, he had a .327 batting average. His 12 home runs led the Big 12 Conference, while his 56 runs batted in (RBIs) placed him second in the conference. He was named a second-team All-American. While at Nebraska, he majored in economics and maintained a grade point average (GPA) of 3.407. Because of his strong grades, he earned placement on the Big 12 Conference Commissioner's Honor Roll, a distinction bestowed upon student-athletes that achieve a GPA of 3.0 or greater, for five of his college semesters.

== Professional career ==
=== Philadelphia Phillies ===
==== Minor leagues ====
The Phillies drafted Asche in the fourth round, with the 151st overall selection, of the 2011 MLB draft. In 2011, the Phillies moved him to second base for his professional debut the Williamsport Crosscutters of the Low–A New York–Penn League. He struggled there, posting a batting average of just .192. After the season, he was moved back to third base. In 2012, he hit .349 with the Clearwater Threshers of the High–A Florida State League, and was promoted to the Reading Phillies of the Double–A Eastern League, where he batted .300. Using his combined stats from all levels during the 2012 season, he led all Phillies minor leaguers with a .324 batting average, and 168 hits; his efforts earned him two Phillies Minor League Player of the Week selections (one in May and one in August), and a Minor League Player of the Month selection in May. The Phillies assigned Asche to the Peoria Javelinas in the Arizona Fall League after the season for further development, and he played in the league's all-star game and led the league in doubles with 11.

Keith Law, a minor league talent evaluator for ESPN, derided Asche as a prospect both offensively and defensively, noting that he likely would not be much of a power hitter and was a questionable defender. Nevertheless, Baseball America rated Asche as the Phillies' seventh-best prospect after the 2012 season. After the 2012 season, another analyst wrote that Asche had an "average" body for a baseball player, commented that while he had limited power potential, he could be a solid contact hitter because of quick hands and "incredibly sound" hitting mechanics, but was a "terrible" defender with a "fringy arm". Subsequently, however, he improved defensively to become "passable". In 2013, Asche played for the Lehigh Valley IronPigs of the Triple–A International League (IL). He was named to the IL team in the Triple-A All-Star Game. After batting .295 with 15 home runs and 68 RBIs for Lehigh Valley, and being named their Player of the Month for July, the Phillies promoted Asche to the major leagues on July 30. One writer found it "mildly surprising" that the Phillies called up Asche rather than Maikel Franco, a fellow third base prospect who most thought had far more potential than Asche.

==== Major leagues ====
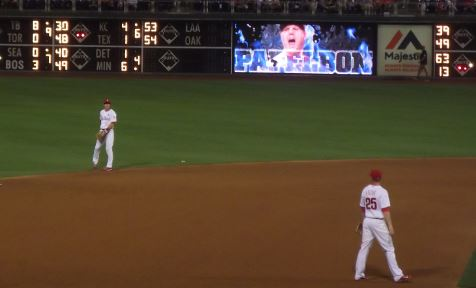
Asche (right) has drawn comparisons to fellow infielder Chase Utley (left)

==== 2013 ====
Although Asche was a non-roster invitee to major league spring training, the Phillies called up Asche to give him "an extended look" at the third base position, particularly in comparison to Franco. On July 30, 2013, Asche was called up by the Phillies, who quickly installed him as the team's starting third baseman. Upon his call-up, some scouts and coaches compared him to Chase Utley, particularly his demeanor. Asche hoped to emulate Utley, noting, "I can only hope someday I can be compared to that guy." As a hitter, he is better as a contact hitter than a power hitter; defensively, he made improvements, which (at the time) brought him accolades from then-Phillies manager Ryne Sandberg.

On August 8, Asche went 3-for-5 with a double, a home run and two RBI. He had a two-run home run to right field in the fourth inning to give the Phillies a nine-run lead. It was the first home run of his big league career. On September 6, 2013, Asche hit a game-winning two-run homer to lead the Phillies over the first-place Atlanta Braves. Asche concluded the 2013 season with a .235 batting average, 5 home runs, and 22 RBI at the major league level.

==== 2014 ====
Entering the 2014 season, most writers thought he had earned the starting third baseman's job. Bill Baer, a writer for ESPN, NBC Sports, and Baseball Prospectus, noted that not only had Asche earned a starting spot, but that his 2013 success helped the development of the team at large. He explained,

"Last year, the Phillies went into the off-season looking at a weak free agent market for third basemen and no realistic internal options. The Phillies opted to trade for Michael Young, which did not pan out. Considering the way Asche has played in a month-plus, the Phillies don’t have to worry about third base at all this off-season. Even better is that Maikel Franco will get a chance to prove himself at the Triple-A level over an entire season. Had Asche not been an option, the Phillies may have gone with another stopgap solution, and that could have motivated the Phillies to rush Franco along faster than necessary," – Bill Baer

Phillies manager Ryne Sandberg also called Asche the leading candidate for the job, noting that he would be the Phillies first homegrown third baseman since Scott Rolen. Most were optimistic on Asche's development, though noted he is another left-handed hitter in a lineup dominated by lefties, featuring only one-to-two righties. The Phillies ultimately demoted Franco, and Asche was named the opening day starter at third base.

Asche began the 2014 successfully; on opening day, he went three-for-four at the plate (3 hits in 4 at bats), scored four runs, had a double, home run, and two RBI. However, over the first month of the season, he struggled, which led to frequent replacement in the lineup by either Freddy Galvis or Jayson Nix, particularly against left-handed pitchers. None of the trio produced offensively, which led to suggestions within the media the Phillies should promote Franco. On May 6, however, he had four hits in four at bats, including a game-tying grand slam in a game against the Toronto Blue Jays, though the Phillies ultimately lost in extra innings. He struggled mightily in the field on May 13, committing three total errors, two of which occurred in an inning during which the Angels scored four unearned runs. However, after that series, Asche bounced back against the Reds in a three-game series during which he went 7 for 12 with six RBI and three extra base hits, including a three-run home run. On May 25, he was placed on the disabled list as a precaution due to a strained left hamstring. As the season progressed, Asche was the regular starter, and ultimately, he described his season as "satisfactory", with room for improvement, while Crashburn Alley's Michael Baumann called Asche's season "encouraging and disappointing at the same time."

==== 2015 ====
Asche began the 2015 season among the team's hottest hitters, and a mainstay in the lineup as the team's starting third baseman. However, in late April, he began working on skills as an outfielder, ostensibly in preparation for the arrival of minor league prospect Maikel Franco, regarded as a stronger defensive third baseman. In fact, the Phillies optioned Asche back to Triple-A on May 12 to accelerate his development as a left fielder, as Franco was hitting very well in the minor leagues, and could be ready for a promotion. Although surprised and disappointed by the move, Asche sought to trust the organization and play wherever it needed him. Ultimately, Asche struggled to find playing time during the remainder of the season, although MLB.com writer Todd Zolecki said that Asche would be given an opportunity in 2016 as the Phillies like his makeup, but the burden will be on him to produce results to justify the playing time, given the amelioration of other options at his positions.

==== 2016 ====
Asche struggled to establish himself throughout the 2016 season, and ultimately the emergence of Franco at third base forced Asche permanently into the outfield, where he struggled to produce after returning from an oblique injury that sidelined him until June. He stayed with the major league team from June 2 through August 9, but was optioned to Lehigh Valley upon the return of Peter Bourjos. In the minor leagues, he hit .302, earning a September call-up, but he did not earn significant playing time throughout the remainder of the season, and ultimately, his season ended with a "disappointing" stat line of a .213 batting average with four home runs and 13 RBI in 71 games. The Phillies designated Asche for assignment on December 2, 2016, following the waiver claim of David Rollins, and he became a free agent.

=== Chicago White Sox ===
On January 6, 2017, Asche signed a minor league contract with the Chicago White Sox. During April and May of the 2017 season, Asche appeared in 19 MLB games with Chicago, batting 6-for-57 (.105) with one home run and four RBI. He was outrighted to the Triple–A Charlotte Knights on May 16, where he batted .292 in 87 games, with 14 home runs and 57 RBI. He became a free agent after the season.

=== New York Yankees ===
On December 14, 2017, Asche signed a minor league contract with the Kansas City Royals that included an invitation to spring training. On April 4, 2018, the Royals traded Asche to the New York Yankees for a player to be named later or cash considerations. He was assigned to the Triple–A Scranton/Wilkes-Barre RailRiders, where he batted .169 in 16 games. He was released by the organization on May 1.

=== New York Mets ===
The New York Mets signed Asche to a minor league deal on May 3, 2018, and assigned him to the Triple-A Las Vegas 51s. In 89 games with Las Vegas, Asche batted .230 with 10 home runs and 38 RBI. He became a free agent after the season on November 2.

=== Sugar Land Skeeters ===
On February 6, 2019, Asche signed a minor league deal with the Los Angeles Dodgers. After being released at the end of spring training, on April 15, 2019, Asche signed with the Sugar Land Skeeters of the Atlantic League of Professional Baseball. In 6 games, he went 5–for–20 (.250) with one home run, three RBI, and one stolen base.

=== Boston Red Sox ===
On May 3, 2019, Asche's contract was purchased by the Boston Red Sox; he was subsequently assigned to the Double–A Portland Sea Dogs. In 23 games for Portland, he slashed .208/.363/.292 with one home run, eight RBI, and three stolen bases. Asche elected free agency following the season on November 4.

On December 20, 2019, Asche signed a minor league contract with the Minnesota Twins. He did not play in a game in 2020 due to the cancellation of the minor league season because of the COVID-19 pandemic. Asche became a free agent on November 2, 2020.

== Coaching career ==
On March 31, 2021, it was announced that Asche was hired as the hitting coach for the Clearwater Threshers, the Low-A affiliate of the Philadelphia Phillies.

Asche joined the Baltimore Orioles as the organization’s upper–level hitting coordinator beginning with the 2022 season. He was promoted to manager Brandon Hyde's coaching staff as its offensive strategy coach for the 2023 season on November 8, 2022. On November 5, 2024, the Orioles named Asche their hitting coach for the 2025 season.

Asche departed the Orioles on November 4, 2025, to become the assistant hitting coach for the Detroit Tigers.

== Player profile ==
=== Batting ===
When Asche reached the major leagues, he was regarded as having decent potential at the plate, perhaps comparable to Mariners' third baseman Kyle Seager. While he hit for power in the minor leagues, his big league power was expected to be adequate, perhaps averaging 12–14 home runs per season. Baseball Prospect Nation reported that he "gets pull happy when he sells out for power and ultimately swings too hard at times." Like most left-handed hitters, Asche performed better against right-handed pitchers than left-handed pitchers, hitting .238 off the former and .219 off the latter in the major leagues during 2013. FanGraphs columnist Michael Barr summarized Asche's offensive potential by writing, "He's certainly not going to be a world beater, but having double digit home run and speed potential while hitting something in the .275 range is likely the kind of hitter than many of you could use at third base."

=== Fielding ===
Though as a minor league prospect, analysts derided his defensive potential, with one calling him "terrible", he progressively improved. Late in 2013, Sandberg commented on his defensive improvement: "I see tremendous progress on his footwork out there, his reads on balls, his quickness, his reacting to the hops and getting the hop he wants. It looks like he's really worked on his glove play, just using the glove along with his strong accurate arm. It's a very true ball that he throws over there. It's got a lot on it. I've seen a lot of improving developments since I saw him in mid-February. He's come a long way."

=== Playing style ===
"Cody has many positives: Natural athletic ability, great hands, good arm, good instincts, and great fundamentals as a hitter. What he lacks, from my perspective at this point, is confidence, experience and tenacity. With experience the other two should follow."

— Hall of Fame third baseman Mike Schmidt, a former member of the Phillies, in an article in Phillies magazine, August 2014

Former Phillies' bench coach Larry Bowa said, "(Asche) reminds me of a younger Chase Utley, he gets real mad when he misses a ball, he wants to make every play, he wants to go out and work, you can't hit enough groundballs to him ... he's got a great attitude ... that kind of energy can invigorate a ball club." Marcus Hayes, a writer for the Philadelphia Daily News concurred with Bowa's comparison of Asche to Utley, calling their similarities "eerie", and writing, "Already, Asche's solution to failure is to ignore fatigue; to work harder; to improve at all costs. His objective is not necessarily to hit home runs, or to hit a big payday, but, rather, to make sure he can beat out a ground ball in late September. Sound familiar?" Sal Rende, the hitting coach for the Phillies' AAA affiliate, noted that Asche also has solid intangibles, including makeup and work ethic, garnering yet another comparison to Utley. For his part, Asche said that while he appreciates the comparison, he wants to be his own player. Asche's determination and work ethic contributed to his fast ascent through the Phillies minor league system. He is a perfectionist, who recalled a game in which he made three fielding errors as his most memorable game with the big league Phillies.

== Personal life ==
Asche is married to Angela Albers, whom he presumably met in college at Nebraska. He is a fan of football and an ardent supporter of the Nebraska Cornhuskers; he routinely drives six hours to attend their home football games. He also "appreciates the speed and violence of hockey"; conversely, he does not like basketball. During the offseason, he resides in O'Fallon, Missouri, which is barely over 10 miles (16 km) from his birthplace of St. Charles, Missouri. According to his MLB.com biography, his hobbies include golfing, fishing, and completing crossword puzzles. In an interview, Asche said his favorite television show was Parks and Recreation, and his favorite food was chicken parmesan. He is close to his family, and noted that he started playing baseball around age five or six, with his first experience being playing in the back yard with his father and brother. When he was first called up to the major leagues, he noted, "Emotions were crazy. Trying to hold back tears seeing your parents in the stands for the first time was tough, then playing on top of that made it a little crazy to start. But that is all part of it. I think the phone call I got to make to my parents the day I was called up was the most memorable part ..."
