= Ryne Sandberg =

American baseball player and manager (1959–2025)

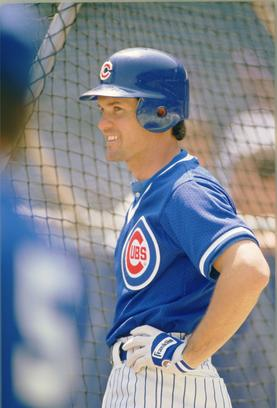
- Sandberg with the Chicago Cubs in 1990
- Second baseman / Manager
- Born: September 18, 1959; Spokane, Washington, U.S.
- Died: July 28, 2025 (aged 65); Lake Bluff, Illinois, U.S.
- Batted: Right Threw: Right

MLB debut
- September 2, 1981, for the Philadelphia Phillies

Last MLB appearance
- September 28, 1997, for the Chicago Cubs

MLB statistics
- Batting average: .285
- Hits: 2,386
- Home runs: 282
- Runs batted in: 1,061
- Managerial record: 119–159
- Winning %: .428
- Stats at Baseball Reference
- Managerial record at Baseball Reference

Teams
- As player: Philadelphia Phillies (1981); Chicago Cubs (1982–1994, 1996–1997); As manager: Philadelphia Phillies (2013–2015); As coach: Philadelphia Phillies (2013)

Career highlights and awards
- 10× All-Star (1984–1993); NL MVP (1984); 9× Gold Glove Award (1983–1991); 7× Silver Slugger Award (1984, 1985, 1988–1992); NL home run leader (1990); Chicago Cubs No. 23 retired; Chicago Cubs Hall of Fame

Member of the National

Baseball Hall of Fame
- Induction: 2005
- Vote: 76.2% (third ballot)

Ryne Dee Sandberg (September 18, 1959 – July 28, 2025), nicknamed "Ryno", was an American professional baseball player, coach and manager. He played 16 seasons in Major League Baseball (MLB) as a shortstop for the Philadelphia Phillies (1981) and a second baseman for the Chicago Cubs (1982–1994, 1996–1997).

After a slow start to his career, Sandberg made a name for himself on June 23, 1984, having a career game including two home runs in what colloquially became known as the "Sandberg Game". After that, Sandberg established himself as a perennial All-Star and Gold Glove candidate, making 10 consecutive All-Star appearances and winning nine consecutive Gold Gloves from 1983 to 1991. His career .989 fielding percentage was a major-league record at second base when he retired in 1997. He is tied with Jose Altuve for the most Silver Slugger Awards for a second baseman with seven. In 2005, Sandberg was elected to the National Baseball Hall of Fame.

After his playing career, Sandberg coached in the minor leagues for the Cubs and Phillies organizations. After briefly serving as a base coach for the Phillies, he became the manager of the Phillies in the middle of the 2013 season, serving in the role until his resignation in the middle of the 2015 season.

== Early life ==
Ryne Dee Sandberg was born on September 18, 1959, in Spokane, Washington, to Elizabeth, a nurse, and Derwent D. "Sandy" Sandberg, a mortician. He was named for relief pitcher Ryne Duren.

Sandberg was a three-sport star at North Central High School and graduated in 1978. In the fall of 1977, he was named to Parade's High School All-America football team, one of eight quarterbacks listed and one of two players from Washington. The school's baseball field was named in his honor in 1985 as "Ryne Sandberg Field," and his varsity number was retired in both football and baseball.

Sandberg was recruited to play quarterback at NCAA Division I colleges, and eventually signed a letter of intent with Washington State University in Pullman.

== Professional career ==
=== Draft and minor leagues ===
Sandberg opted not to attend after being selected in the 20th round of the 1978 baseball amateur draft by the Philadelphia Phillies.

Sandberg was reportedly drafted after Bill Harper and Wilbur "Moose" Johnson, both Philadelphia Phillies scouts, persuaded Phillies director of scouting Dallas Green to draft Sandberg, despite his college football commitment. After the Phillies drafted Sandberg, Harper reportedly met with Sandberg, his parents, and brother Del at their home. "His parents, particularly his mother, were very concerned about Ryne going to college and getting an education," Harper recalled. Sandberg reportedly received a $20,000 bonus, accepting the offer after taking a walk with his brother during the meeting.

In 1978, at age 18, Sandberg began his professional career with the Helena Phillies in the rookie-level Pioneer League. In his first professional season, Sandberg played exclusively at shortstop and hit .311 with a .390 OBP, one home run, 15 stolen bases, and 23 runs batted in (RBIs) in 56 games. Among his teammates at Helena were George Bell, a future MVP, and Bob Dernier, who later formed the "Daily Double" with Sandberg in Chicago. The three advanced through the Phillies system as teammates.

Playing shortstop in 1979, Sandberg played for the Class A Spartanburg Phillies in the Western Carolinas League. In 138 games, he hit .247 with seven triples, four home runs, 21 stolen bases, and 47 RBIs. Sandberg played for the Class AA Reading Phillies of the Eastern League in 1980. With Reading, Sandberg hit .310, with a .403 OBP, 12 triples, 32 stolen bases, 11 home runs, and 79 RBIs. Playing in 129 games for Reading, he drew 73 bases on balls against 72 strikeouts. In the field, he played 120 games at shortstop and four at third base. Sandberg was selected to the Eastern League All-Star team.

Advancing to the Class AAA level Oklahoma City 89ers in 1981, Sandberg played 133 games before being called up by the Philadelphia Phillies. With Oklahoma City, he remained primarily at shortstop, while playing 17 games at second base. Sandberg hit .293, with a .352 OBP, 32 stolen bases, 9 home runs, and 62 RBIs.

=== Philadelphia Phillies (1981) ===
Sandberg made his major-league debut as a shortstop for the Phillies in 1981. Playing in 13 games, Sandberg had one hit in six at-bats for a .167 batting average during his brief stint with the team. The one hit occurred at Wrigley Field using a bat borrowed from starting shortstop Larry Bowa.

The Phillies soon concluded that Sandberg was not a successor to Bowa at shortstop. While Sandberg had played both second and third base in the minor leagues, he was blocked from those positions by Manny Trillo and Mike Schmidt. He was traded along with Bowa to the Cubs for shortstop Iván DeJesús prior to the 1982 season. The trade came about after negotiations for a new contract between Bowa and the Phillies broke down. Cubs general manager Dallas Green wanted a young prospect to go along with the aging Bowa. Green had been instrumental in the drafting of Sandberg in 1978, while working in the Phillies front office. The two remained close over the years.

Years later, Phillies general manager Paul Owens said that he had not wanted to trade Sandberg, but Green and the Cubs were not interested in any of the other prospects he offered. Owens then went back to his scouts, who said Sandberg would not be any more than a utility infielder. However, Sandberg had hit over .290 in the minors two years in a row. The trade is now considered one of the best (if not the best) in recent Cubs history. At the same time, it is considered one of the worst trades in Phillies history. While DeJesús helped the Phillies infield on their way to the 1983 World Series, he lasted only three years in Philadelphia.

=== Chicago Cubs (1982–1994, 1996–1997) ===
==== 1982–1983 ====
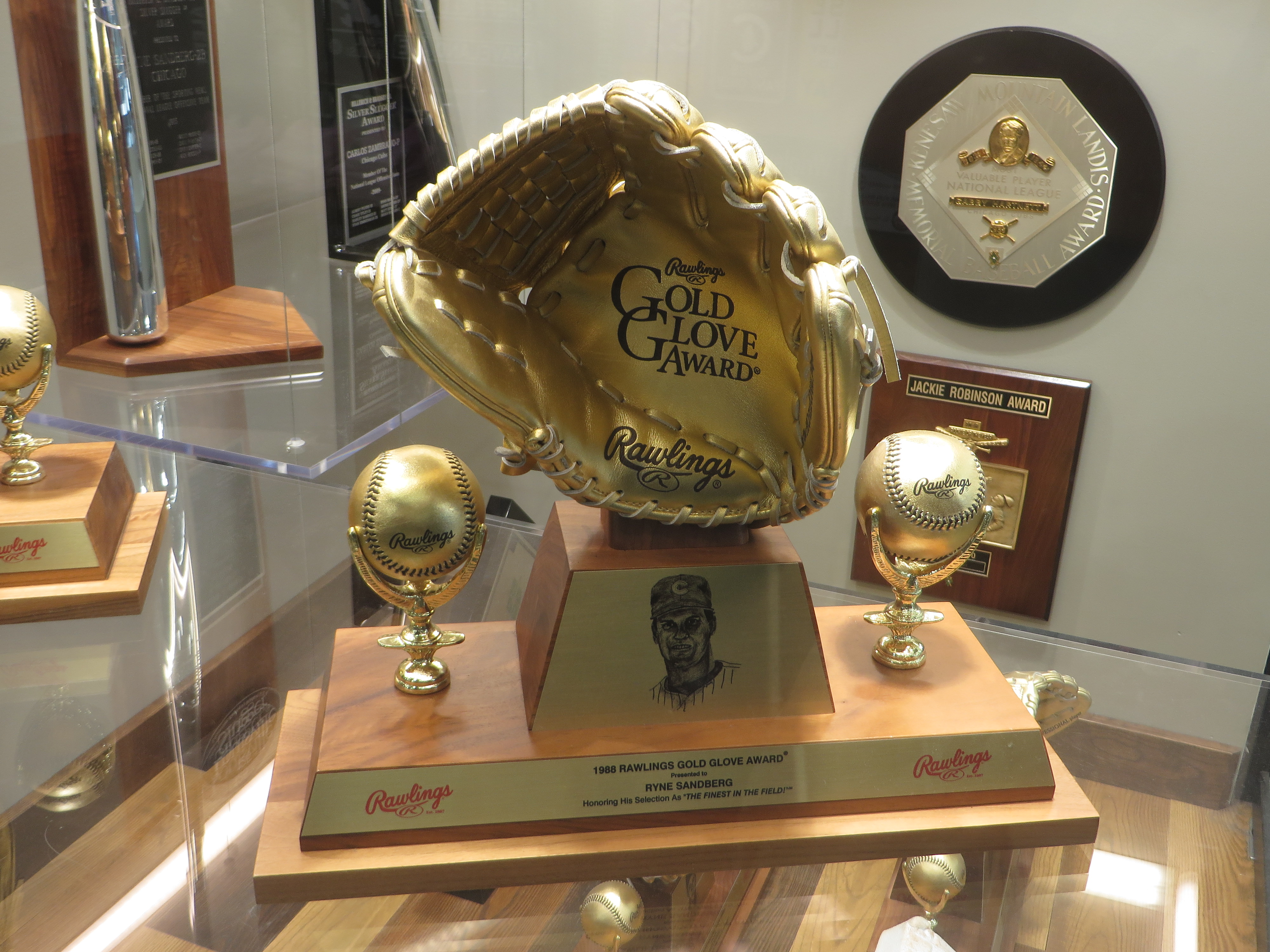
1988 Gold Glove Award trophy, received by Sandberg

The Cubs installed Sandberg as their third baseman, before shifting him to second base late in the season with the call-up of rookie third baseman Pat Tabler. Despite never having played third base before, he made just 11 errors in 140 games, and with 172 hits at a .271 batting average, he finished sixth in Rookie of the Year voting.

After the Cubs acquired veteran Ron Cey following the 1982 season, they moved Sandberg to second base full-time. Sandberg had 165 hits at a .261 average, to go along with 30 steals. He won the Gold Glove Award for second base, the first of nine consecutive such awards, becoming only the third National League player to win a Gold Glove in their first season at a new position.

==== 1984 ====
Sandberg emerged with a breakout season in 1984, in which he batted .314 with 200 hits, 114 runs, 36 doubles, 19 triples, 19 home runs, and 84 RBIs. Bob Dernier was the leadoff hitter and Gold Glove center fielder for the Cubs in 1984, while Sandberg batted second. The pair was dubbed "the Daily Double" by Cubs announcer Harry Caray. In 1984, Sandberg's runs and triples totals led the National League. He was one triple and one home run shy of being the first player in MLB history to collect 200 hits, 20 doubles, 20 triples, 20 home runs, and 20 stolen bases in the same season, and led the Cubs to the National League's Eastern Division title for their first playoff appearance since 1945. The Cubs went on to lose in the National League Championship Series, 3–2 to the San Diego Padres. He was named the National League Most Valuable Player after receiving 22 out of 24 first place votes, the first Cub to do so since Ernie Banks' back-to-back honors in 1958 and 1959, and the first for a second baseman since Joe Morgan in 1976.

==== The Sandberg Game ====
In an NBC national telecast of a Cardinals–Cubs game on June 23, 1984, the Cubs trailed 9–8 in the ninth inning against future Hall of Fame closer Bruce Sutter, who would save a league-leading 45 games that season. Sandberg slugged a solo home run to left field, tying the game. After the Cardinals scored two runs in the top of the 10th inning, Sandberg hit a two-run homer against Sutter in the 10th inning to again tie the game. Cubs radio announcer Harry Caray described the home run:

There's a drive, way back! Might be outta here! It is! It is! He did it again! He did it again! The game is tied! The game is tied! Holy Cow! Listen to this crowd, everybody's gone bananas! What would the odds be if I told you that twice Sandberg would hit home runs off Bruce Sutter?

Following the home run, NBC play-by-play announcer Bob Costas said: "Do you believe it?". The Cubs won the game in the 11th inning on an RBI single by Dave Owen. Cardinals manager Whitey Herzog later remarked: "Ryne Sandberg is the best baseball player I've ever seen, as far as I'm concerned." The game, commonly known as the Sandberg Game, is also memorable because the Cardinals' Willie McGee hit for the cycle.

==== 1985 ====
In 1985, Sandberg batted .305 with 26 home runs, 83 RBIs, 113 runs scored, and a career-high 54 stolen bases, joining the 20–50 club with his combination of power and speed.

==== 1990 ====
In 1990, Sandberg led the National League in home runs with 40, becoming only the third second baseman to reach that mark; Rogers Hornsby and Davey Johnson hit 42, and no American League second baseman had reached 40 until Brian Dozier in 2016. Sandberg also batted in 100 runs, despite batting second in the order. His batting average did not suffer from his new level of power, as he finished at .306 for the season.

Sandberg played 123 straight games at second base without an error, which was then a major league record. This record was later broken in 2007 by Luis Castillo of the Minnesota Twins. Sandberg played in front of his hometown fans in the 1990 MLB All-Star Game, which was held at Wrigley Field, home of the Cubs. Sandberg won the Home Run Derby with three home runs over the left-field bleachers. Not until the Cincinnati Reds' Todd Frazier in 2015 did another player win the Home Run Derby in his own home stadium.

==== 1991 ====
In 1991, Sandberg batted .291 with 26 home runs and batted in 100 runs for the second consecutive season. He also won his ninth consecutive Gold Glove at second base, breaking a tie he had shared with Bill Mazeroski and Frank White for most Gold Gloves at that position. (Roberto Alomar later surpassed Sandberg, with ten.)

==== 1992 ====
On March 2, 1992, Sandberg became the highest-paid player in baseball at the time, signing a $28.4 million ($65.2 million today) four-year extension worth $7.1 million ($16.3 million today) a season. He earned a spot on the NL All-Star roster and an NL Silver Slugger Award at second base with a .304 batting average, 26 home runs, 100 runs, and 87 RBIs.

==== 1994 ====
Sandberg, a notoriously slow early-season starter, found himself struggling even more so than usual early in the 1994 season. With his average at a career low .238 and having recorded only 53 hits in 57 games, Sandberg decided to step away from baseball, and on June 13, 1994, he announced his retirement.

==== 1996–1997 ====
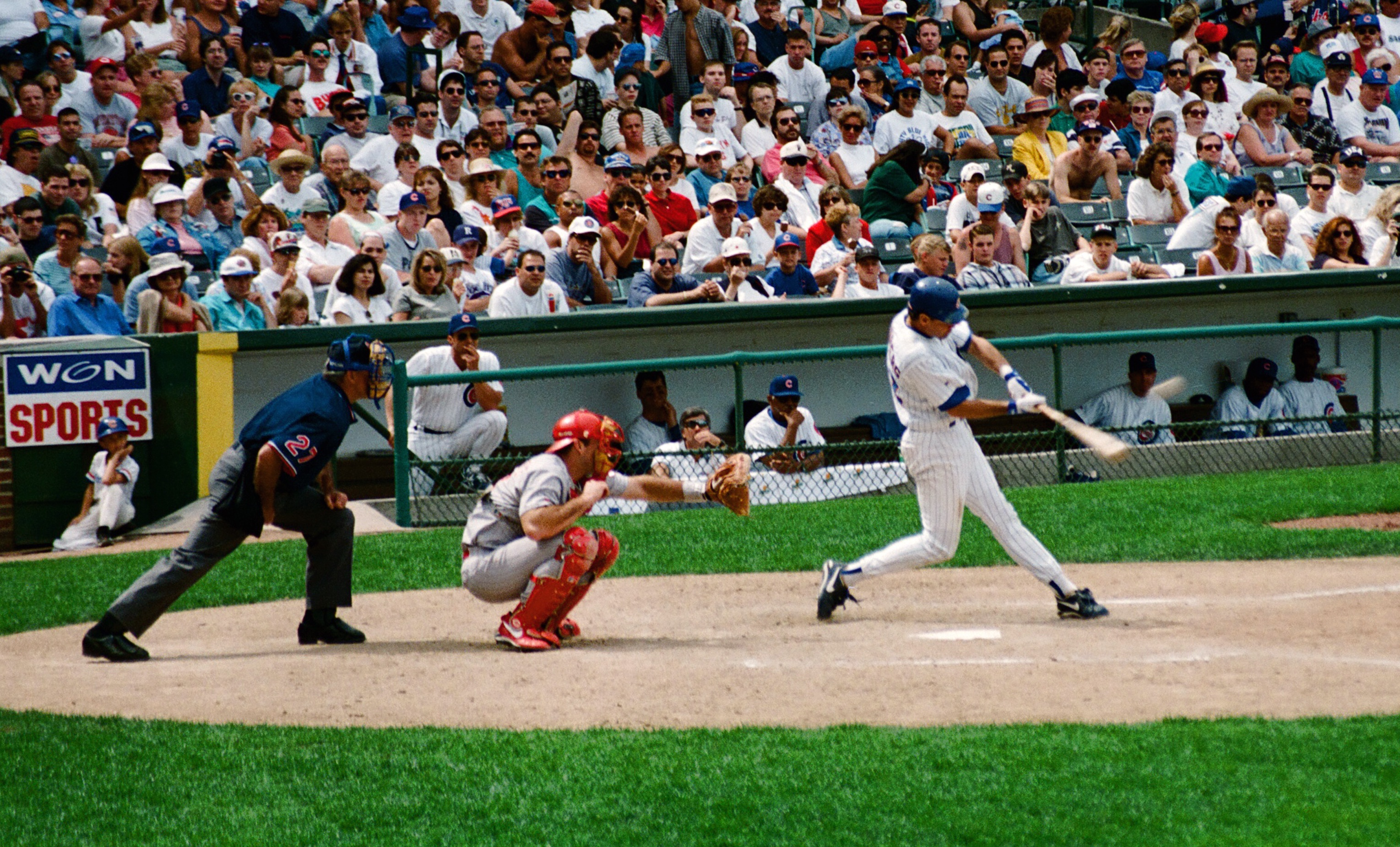
Sandberg hits a double at Wrigley Field, 1996

Sandberg returned to the Chicago Cubs for the 1996 season, and re-signed with the Cubs for 1997.

In his final season on April 26, Sandberg hit his 267th home run to pass Joe Morgan and set a new record for home runs by a second baseman.

Sandberg's final game at Wrigley Field and final career hit were on September 21, 1997. Sandberg retired with a career batting average of .285, and a record 277 home runs as a second baseman; this record was surpassed in 2004 by Jeff Kent.

== Post-playing career ==
Initially, Sandberg kept a low profile after retiring. In 2005, though, Sandberg accepted his first marketing deal since his retirement, agreeing to be spokesman for National City Bank. He also appeared on ESPN Radio 1000 as an analyst during the 2004 baseball season.

=== National Baseball Hall of Fame candidacy and induction ===
Sandberg first appeared on the National Baseball Hall of Fame ballot for its 2003 round of voting; he secured 49.2% of the vote, short of the 75% required for induction. He climbed to 61.1% in 2004, before being elected in his third year on the ballot, with 76.2% of BBWAA writers backing his candidacy.

Sandberg delivered his induction speech at the National Baseball Hall of Fame and Museum in August 2005. He spoke of the importance of playing baseball in the right way, saying "learning how to bunt, hit and run and turning two is more important than knowing where to find the little red light [on] the dugout camera," and the importance of respect for your team, while advocating for the election of former Cubs teammate Andre Dawson and Ron Santo. Dawson went on to be elected by the voters in 2010, while Santo was enshrined by the Veterans' Committee in 2012.

=== Number retirement ===
Ryne Sandberg's number 23 was retired by the Chicago Cubs in 2005.

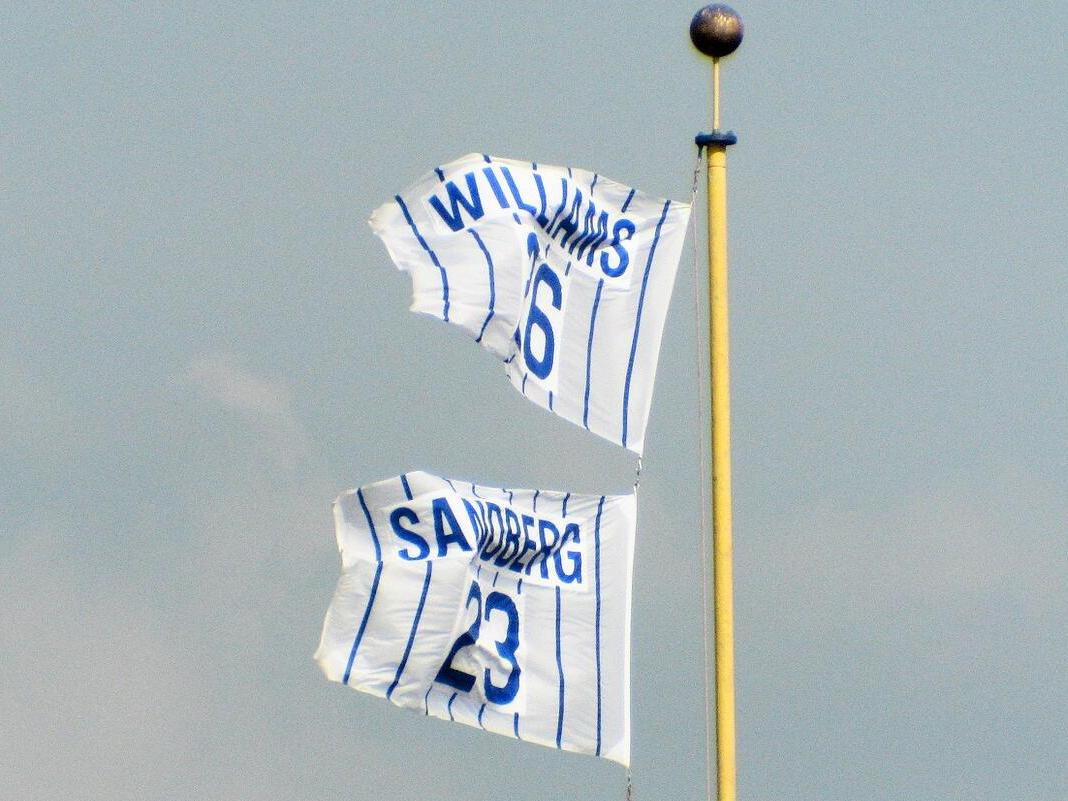
Retired number at Wrigley Field

After his Hall of Fame induction, Sandberg had his number 23 retired in a ceremony at Wrigley Field on August 28, 2005. He became only the fourth Chicago Cub to have his number retired, following Ernie Banks (#14), Billy Williams (#26), and Ron Santo (#10).

== Managerial and coaching career ==
Sandberg spent seven years as a spring training instructor for the Cubs.

=== 2007–2010 ===
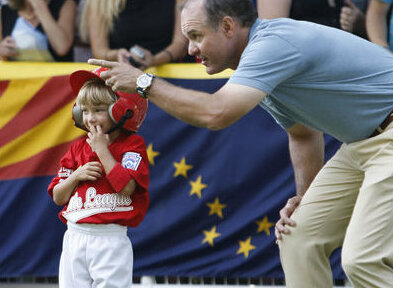
Ryne Sandberg with a tee ball player in 2008

On December 5, 2006, Sandberg was named manager of the Cubs' Class-A Peoria Chiefs in the Midwest League. In December 2008, Sandberg was promoted to manager of the Class Double-A Team Tennessee Smokies in the Southern League. In December 2009, he was again promoted, to manager of the Triple-A Iowa Cubs. Upon leading Iowa to an 82–62 record, the Pacific Coast League named him its 2010 Manager of the Year.

Sandberg said that his ideal job was to manage the Chicago Cubs. Former manager Lou Piniella suggested that Sandberg, as manager of the Cubs' top minor-league affiliate, would be in the mix to replace him when he retired after the 2010 season, but the position was given to interim manager Mike Quade.

=== 2011–2015 ===
On November 15, 2010, Sandberg left the Cubs organization and returned to his original organization as manager of the Phillies' top minor-league affiliate, the Lehigh Valley IronPigs.

He led the IronPigs to their first-ever playoff appearance and the International League championship series. Baseball America named him its 2011 Minor League Manager of the Year.

After the 2012 season, Sandberg was promoted to third-base coach and infield instructor of the Philadelphia Phillies. He was promoted to interim manager of the Phillies after they fired Charlie Manuel on August 16, 2013. Sandberg earned his first win as a manager against the Los Angeles Dodgers on Sunday August 18, 2013.

=== Philadelphia Phillies (2013–2015) ===
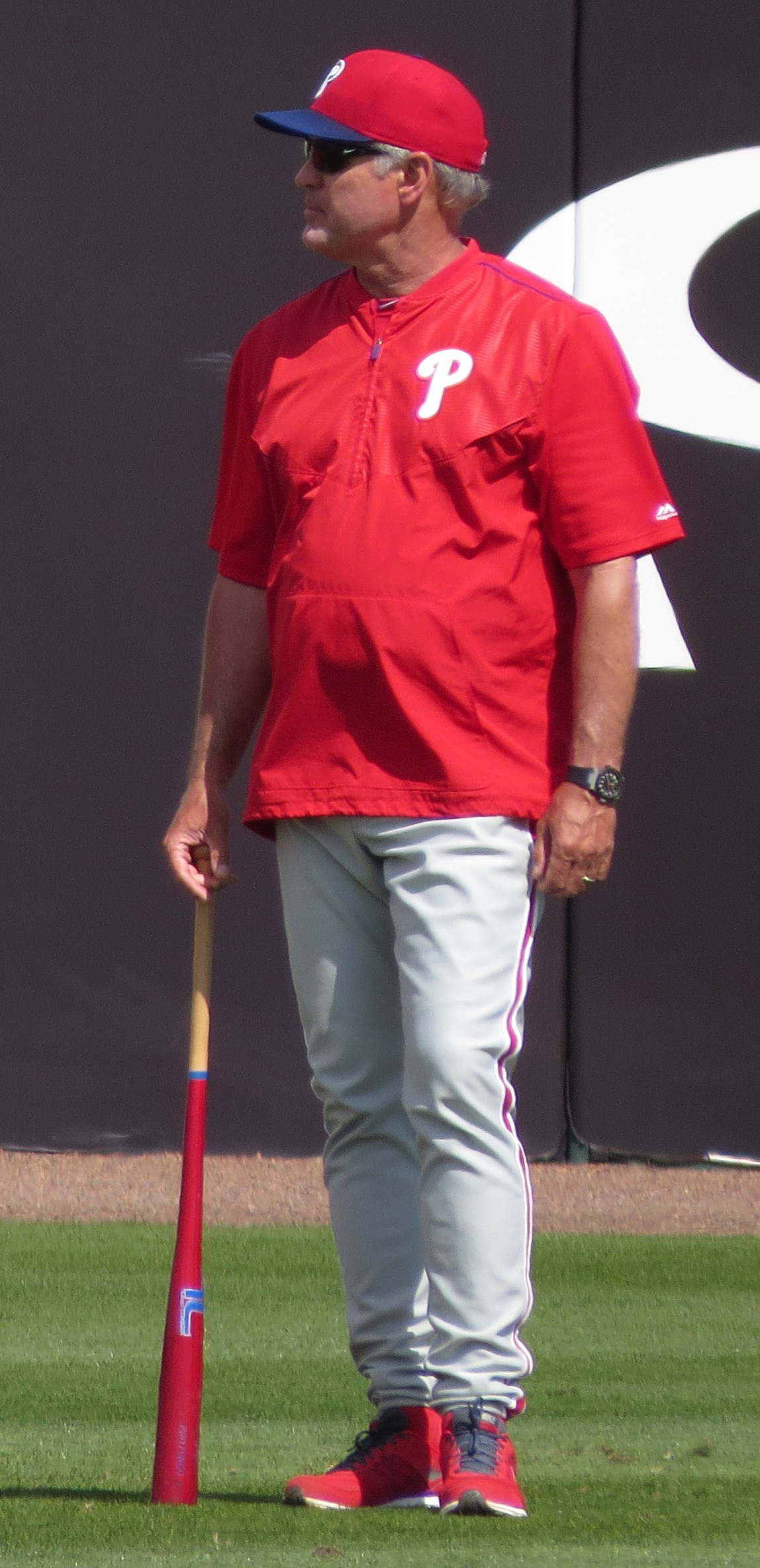
Sandberg during his managing tenure with the Philadelphia Phillies in 2015 spring training

On September 22, 2013, the interim tag was removed, and Sandberg was named manager. He was given a three-year contract, with a club option for 2017. He became the third player to manage a team full-time after being inducted into the Hall of Fame as a player, following Ted Williams and Frank Robinson.

Sandberg resigned from the position of Phillies manager on June 26, 2015, with his team in last place in the National League East Division at a record of 26–48, the worst record in MLB. Sandberg ended his managerial tenure with a record of 119–159.

=== Cubs ambassador ===
In 2016, Sandberg joined the Cubs organization as a goodwill ambassador. In this position, he made public appearances at Cubs-related events, and attended Cubs games to meet and greet fans; he was an occasional color commentator for the team's telecasts on Marquee Sports Network.

== Managerial record ==
Team	Year	Regular season					Postseason			
Team	Year	Games	Won	Lost	Win %	Finish	Won	Lost	Win %	Result
PHI	2013	42	20	22	.476	4th in NL East	–	–	–	
PHI	2014	162	73	89	.451	5th in NL East	–	–	–	
PHI	2015	74	26	48	.351	Resigned	–	–	–	
Total		278	119	159	.428		–	–	–	

== Personal life ==
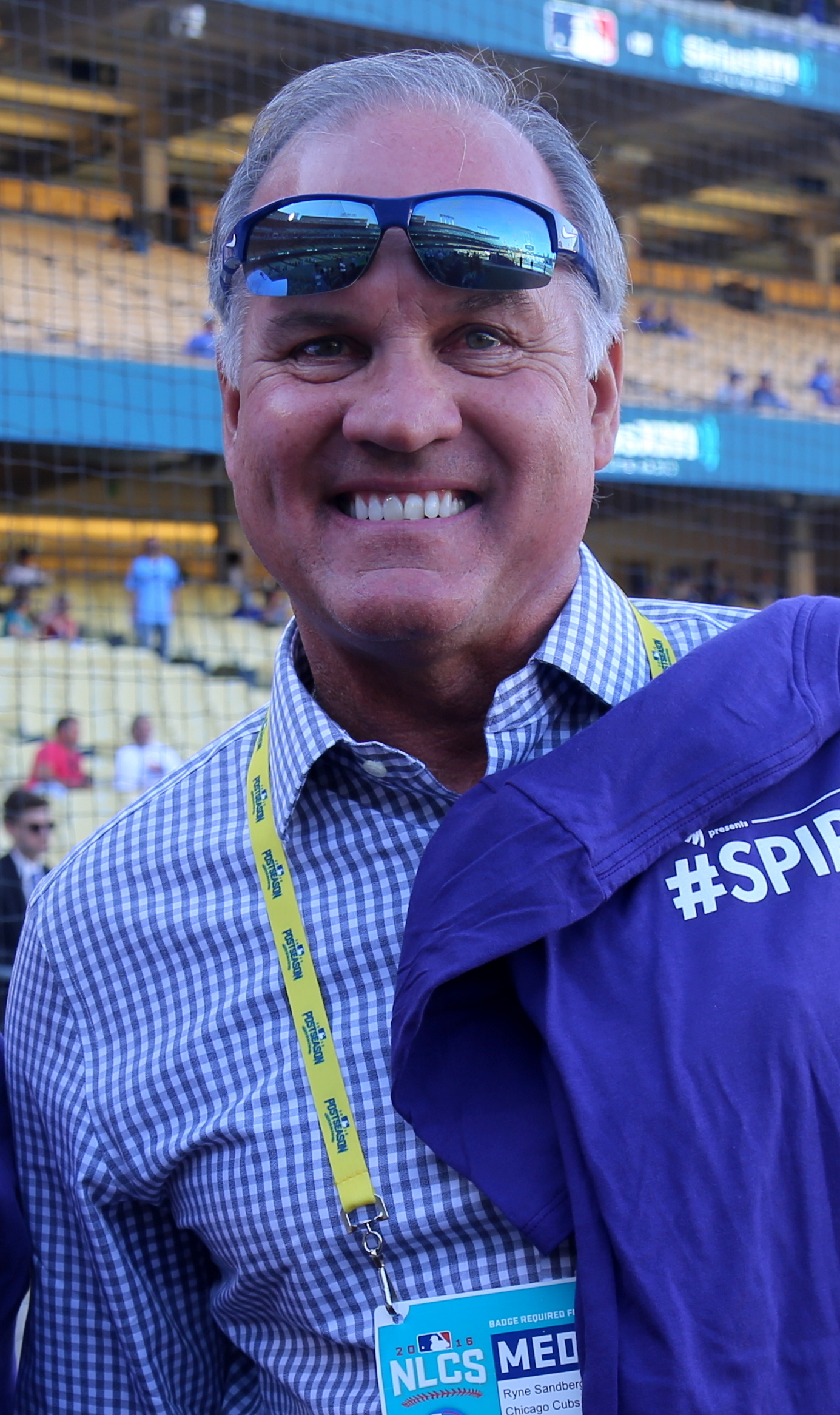
Sandberg in 2016

Sandberg married his high school sweetheart, Cindy White, and they had two children, Lindsey and Justin. They divorced in July 1995. Sandberg married Margaret Koehnemann in August 1995. She has three children from her former marriage. Ryne's nephew, Jared Sandberg, was a third baseman for the Tampa Bay Rays from 2001 to 2003.

=== Illness and death ===
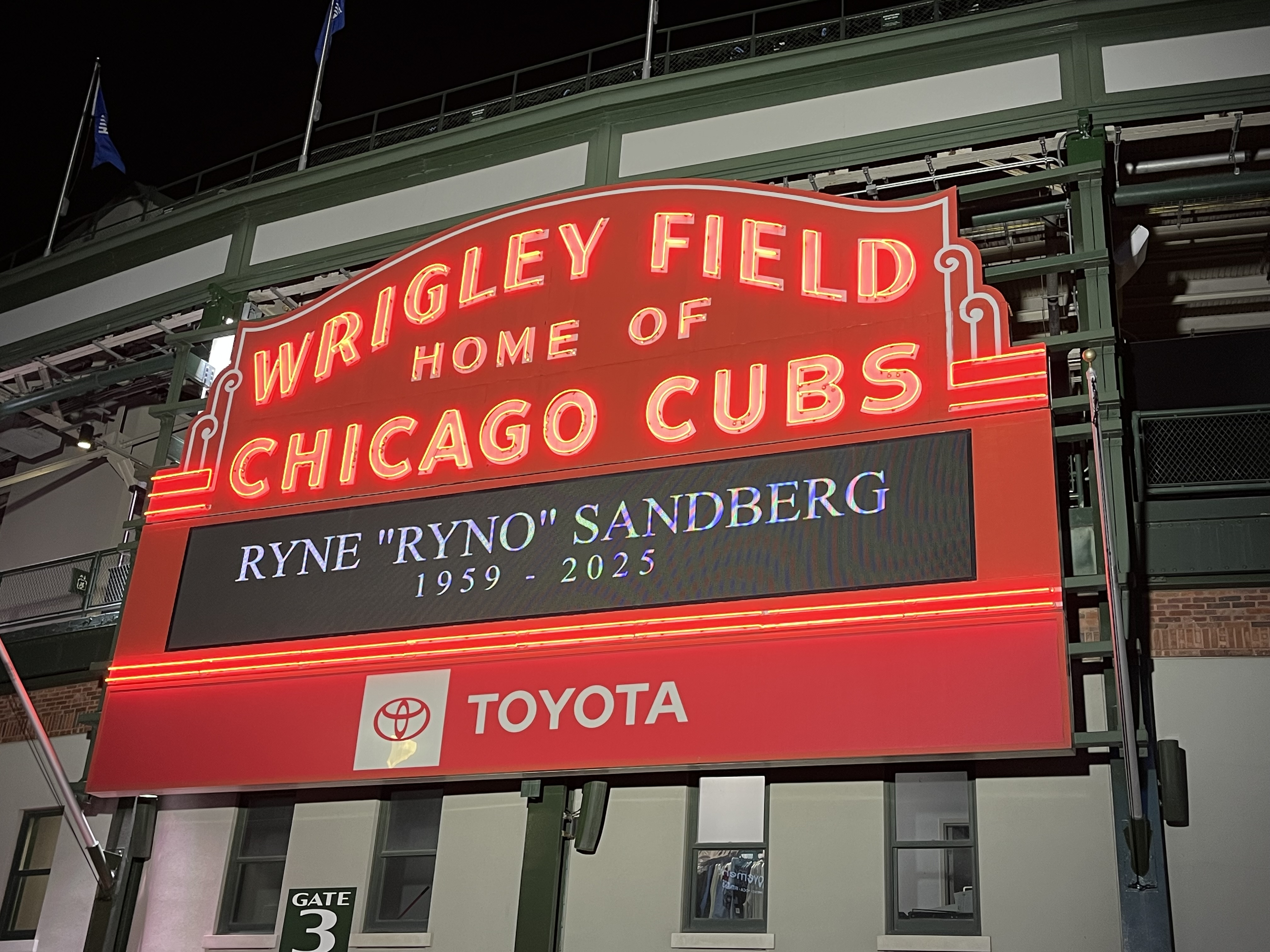
Sandberg honored on the famous Wrigley Field marquee the night of his death

In January 2024, Sandberg announced that he had begun treatment for metastatic prostate cancer. After months of intensive chemotherapy and radiation treatments, he was declared cancer-free in August 2024, but on December 10, 2024, Sandberg announced that the cancer had returned and spread to other organs.

He died at his home in Lake Bluff, Illinois, on July 28, 2025, at the age of 65.

On August 2, 2025, every Cubs player and manager Craig Counsell wore number 23 to honor Sandberg.

=== Charity foundations ===
Sandberg and Margaret founded Ryno Kid Care to assist in the lives of children with serious illnesses. The organization provided anything from "big brothers" (mentors and older companions) to a home-cooked meal. Ryno Kid Care also provided massage therapists and clowns dressed up as doctors and nurses to brighten the children's day. Ryno Kid Care's mission was "dedicated to enhancing the lives of children with serious medical conditions and their families, by providing supportive, compassionate and meaningful programming." Ryno Kid Care is no longer in operation.

=== Awards ===
Sandberg was inducted as a laureate of The Lincoln Academy of Illinois and awarded the Order of Lincoln (the state's highest honor) by the governor of Illinois in 2017.

He was honored by a statue which was dedicated in 2024. The bronze sculpture is located at Gallagher Way, a park outside of Wrigley Field. His baseball achievements are listed and the text of his Hall of Fame plaque is part of the sculpture.

== See also ==
- List of athletes who came out of retirement
- List of Major League Baseball annual home run leaders
- List of Major League Baseball annual runs scored leaders
- List of Major League Baseball annual triples leaders
- List of Major League Baseball career home run leaders
- List of Major League Baseball career hits leaders
- List of Major League Baseball career doubles leaders
- List of Major League Baseball career runs scored leaders
- List of Major League Baseball career runs batted in leaders
- List of Major League Baseball career stolen bases leaders

Preceded by Hubie Brooks	Topps Rookie All-Star Third Baseman; 1982	Succeeded by Nick Esasky
Preceded by Leon Durham; Andre Dawson	National League Player of the Month; June 1984; June 1990	Succeeded by José Cruz; Barry Bonds
