= Ethan Martin =

American baseball player (born 1989)

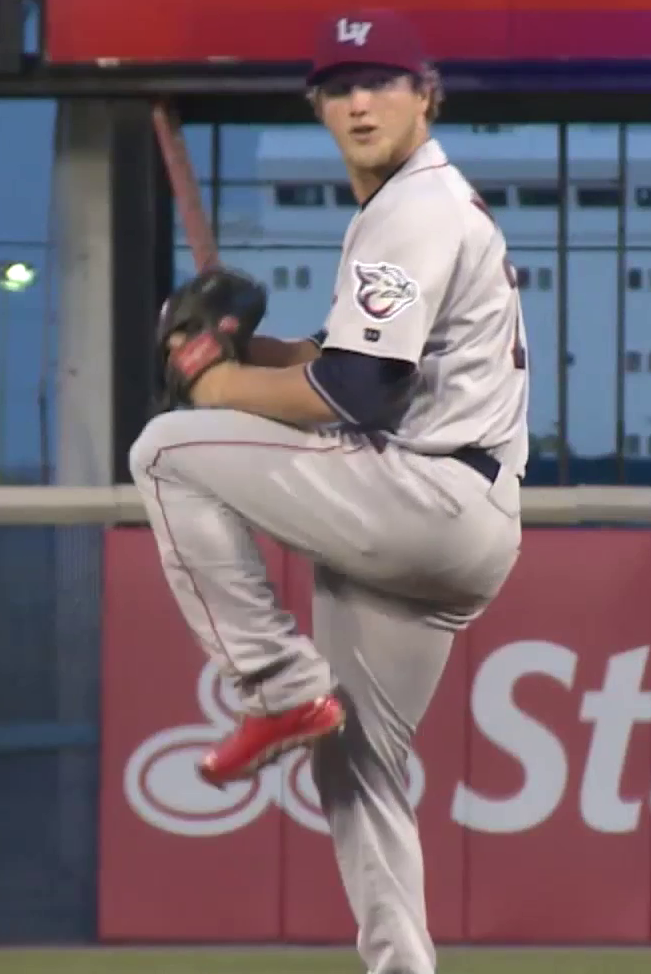
- Martin with the Lehigh Valley IronPigs in 2013
- Pitcher
- Born: June 6, 1989 (age 37); Athens, Georgia, U.S.
- Batted: Right Threw: Right

MLB debut
- August 2, 2013, for the Philadelphia Phillies

Last MLB appearance
- June 7, 2014, for the Philadelphia Phillies

MLB statistics
- Win–loss record: 2–5
- Earned run average: 5.93
- Strikeouts: 51
- Stats at Baseball Reference

Teams
- Philadelphia Phillies (2013–2014)

Ethan Cash Martin (born June 6, 1989) is an American former professional baseball pitcher. He played in Major League Baseball (MLB) for the Philadelphia Phillies in 2013 and 2014.

== Professional career ==
=== Los Angeles Dodgers ===
Martin was drafted in the 1st round of the 2008 MLB draft by the Los Angeles Dodgers. He began his career with the Great Lakes Loons in 2009, when he was 6-8 with a 3.87 ERA in 27 games (19 starts). In 2010 with the Inland Empire 66ers of San Bernardino he was 9-14 with a 6.35 ERA in 25 appearances (22 starts). He began 2011 in the starting rotation for the Rancho Cucamonga Quakes but was moved to the bullpen in midseason and then promoted to Double-A with the Chattanooga Lookouts. Combined he was 9-7 with a 5.95 ERA in 37 appearances (12 starts) in 2011. In 2012 with the Lookouts, he was 8-6 with a 3.58 ERA and selected to the mid-season Southern League all-star team.

=== Philadelphia Phillies ===
On July 31, 2012, the Dodgers traded Martin to the Philadelphia Phillies along with fellow right-handed pitcher Josh Lindblom for outfielder Shane Victorino.

After being the "workhorse" of the Triple-A Lehigh Valley IronPigs, Martin was called up to the major leagues to make his debut against the Atlanta Braves on August 2, 2013. He allowed 6 runs in 4 1/3 innings to take the loss in his debut. Martin earned his first Major League victory on August 8, 2013 with a 12-1 victory over the Cubs. He allowed one run over 5 innings. After seven starts in which he amassed a 2–4 record with a 6.90 ERA, Martin was sent to the bullpen. At that time, Phillies veteran pitcher Roy Halladay gave him a baseball card that showed the 2000 season in which Halladay posted a 10.64 ERA, encouraging Martin to understand even the best pitchers have rough spots.

Entering spring training in 2014, Martin was in major league camp, and was expected to compete for a spot on the major league roster, either as a starter or a reliever. However, he left his first spring training appearance due to discomfort in his throwing shoulder. While his fastball averaged 93.2 miles per hour (150.0 km/h) in 2013, it reached only 85 miles per hour (137 km/h) during the appearance. He was outrighted off the 40-man roster on June 29, 2015. On December 11, 2015 Martin signed with the Braves, but he was released on March 29, 2016. He has not pitched professionally since.
