= Tyler Cloyd =

American baseball player (born 1987)

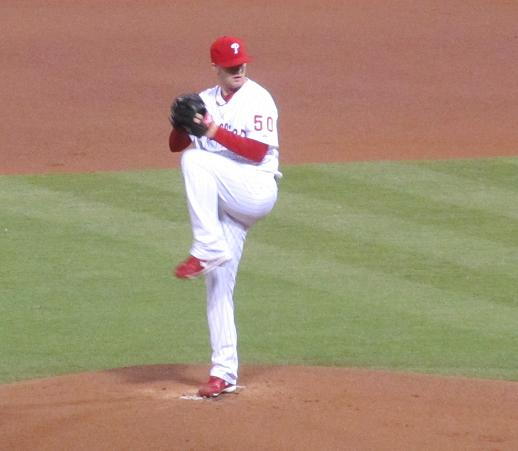
- Cloyd with the Philadelphia Phillies
- Pitcher
- Born: May 16, 1987 (age 39); Bellevue, Nebraska, U.S.
- Batted: Right Threw: Right

Professional debut
- MLB: August 29, 2012, for the Philadelphia Phillies
- KBO: April 3, 2015, for the Samsung Lions

Last appearance
- MLB: June 6, 2018, for the Miami Marlins
- KBO: September 30, 2015, for the Samsung Lions

MLB statistics
- Win–loss record: 5–9
- Earned run average: 6.35
- Strikeouts: 85

KBO statistics
- Win–loss record: 11–11
- Earned run average: 5.19
- Strikeouts: 123
- Stats at Baseball Reference

Teams
- Philadelphia Phillies (2012–2013); Samsung Lions (2015); Seattle Mariners (2017); Miami Marlins (2018)

Tyler James Cloyd (born May 16, 1987) is an American former professional baseball pitcher. He played in Major League Baseball (MLB) for the Philadelphia Phillies, Seattle Mariners, and Miami Marlins, and in the KBO League for the Samsung Lions.

== Baseball career ==
Cloyd attended the University of Nebraska at Omaha, where he played college baseball for the Nebraska–Omaha Mavericks.

=== Philadelphia Phillies ===
The Phillies drafted Cloyd in the 18th round of the 2008 Major League Baseball draft. Though he was expected to begin the 2012 season with the Reading Phillies of the Class AA Eastern League, he was instead assigned to the Lehigh Valley IronPigs of the Class AAA International League due to the suspension of another pitcher. He pitched in the Triple-A All-Star Game and was named the International League Most Valuable Pitcher in 2012.

Cloyd made his major-league debut on August 29, 2012, replacing Cole Hamels, who was ill. Cloyd pitched six innings, allowing three runs on seven hits. Cloyd got his first MLB win vs. the Reds, giving up 1 run in 7 innings. Cloyd made 11 starts and 2 relief appearances for the Phillies in 2013, going 2–7 with a 6.56 ERA.

=== Cleveland Indians ===
On October 2, 2013, Cloyd was designated for assignment and claimed by the Cleveland Indians. To make room on the 40-man roster, lefty Clay Rapada was designated for assignment. The Indians then designated him for assignment on November 25. On December 2, Cloyd was non-tendered by the Indians, making him a free agent. He was re-signed to a minor league deal on December 13. On July 30, 2014, Cloyd threw a no hitter for the Columbus Clippers of the International League in a 13–0 win against the Louisville Bats.

The Indians released Cloyd on January 6, 2015.

=== Samsung Lions ===
On January 8, 2015, Cloyd signed with the Samsung Lions of the KBO League. Cloyd made 28 starts for the Lions, compiling an 11-11 record and 5.19 ERA with 123 strikeouts across 159 2/3 innings pitched.

=== New York Yankees ===
On February 1, 2016, Cloyd signed a minor league contract with the New York Yankees. He made 4 appearances (3 starts) for the Triple–A Scranton/Wilkes-Barre RailRiders, logging a 1.37 ERA with 17 strikeouts across 19 2/3 innings. In May 2016, Cloyd underwent Tommy John surgery and missed the remainder of the season. He elected free agency following the season on November 7.

=== Somerset Patriots ===
On April 7, 2017, Cloyd signed with the Somerset Patriots of the Atlantic League of Professional Baseball. In three appearances for Somerset, Cloyd recorded a 1.50 ERA with 16 strikeouts over 12 innings of work.

=== Seattle Mariners ===
On May 11, 2017, Cloyd had his contract purchased by the Seattle Mariners and was assigned to the Triple-A Tacoma Rainiers. He was called up on June 2, but did not pitch until he appeared in relief against the Toronto Blue Jays on June 9. On June 21, Cloyd was designated for assignment. He spent the remainder of the year with Tacoma, registering a 5.67 ERA with 48 strikeouts across 19 games (14 starts). Cloyd elected free agency following the season on November 6.

=== Miami Marlins ===
On January 12, 2018, Cloyd signed a minor league deal with the Miami Marlins. He had his contract purchased on April 8. In seven appearances for the Marlins, Cloyd struggled to an 8.66 ERA with 13 strikeouts across 17 2/3 innings pitched. He was removed from the 40–man roster and sent outright to the Triple–A New Orleans Baby Cakes on October 12. Cloyd rejected the assignment and elected free agency the same day.

=== Somerset Patriots (second stint) ===
On February 11, 2019, Cloyd signed a minor league contract with the Tampa Bay Rays that included an invite to Spring Training. He was released by the Rays organization on March 26.

On April 9, 2019, Cloyd signed with the Somerset Patriots of the Atlantic League of Professional Baseball.

=== Seattle Mariners (second stint) ===
On April 19, 2019, Cloyd's contract was purchased by the Seattle Mariners, and he was assigned to the Triple-A Tacoma Rainiers. In 15 games (13 starts) for the Rainiers, he compiled a 2–8 record and 7.43 ERA with 69 strikeouts across 66 2/3 innings pitched. Cloyd was released by the Mariners organization on July 15.

=== Somerset Patriots (third stint) ===
On July 21, 2019, Cloyd signed with the Somerset Patriots of the Atlantic League of Professional Baseball. In 15 appearances (seven starts) for Somerset, he posted a 1-3 record and 3.48 ERA with 39 strikeouts and two saves across 44 innings of work. Cloyd became a free agent following the season.

On February 19, 2020, Cloyd signed with the Sioux City Explorers of the American Association of Independent Professional Baseball. However, the team was not selected by the league to compete in the condensed 2020 season due to the COVID-19 pandemic. Cloyd was not chosen by another team in the dispersal draft, and therefore became a free agent.

== Personal life ==
Cloyd is a native of Bellevue, Nebraska. He and his wife Tonya married in 2010 and have four children (two daughters and two sons).
