= 2013 Miami Marlins season =

2013 Miami Marlins
- League: National League
- Division: East
- Ballpark: Marlins Park
- City: Miami, Florida
- Record: 62–100 (.383)
- Divisional place: 5th
- Owners: Jeffrey Loria
- President of baseball operations: Larry Beinfest
- General managers: Michael Hill
- Managers: Mike Redmond
- Television: Fox Sports Florida; Sun Sports (English: Rich Waltz, Tommy Hutton, Craig Minervini, Frank Forte, Allison Williams) (Spanish: Raul Striker Jr., Cookie Rojas)
- Radio: Miami Marlins Radio Network (English) (Dave Van Horne, Glenn Geffner); WAQI (Spanish) (Felo Ramírez, Luis Quintana)

The Miami Marlins' 2013 season was the 21st season for the Major League Baseball franchise, and the second as the "Miami" Marlins. The Marlins finished the season with a 62–100 record, their second worst record as an MLB franchise, and failed to make the playoffs for the tenth consecutive season.

== Season standings ==
=== National League East ===
NL East
Team	W	L	Pct.	GB	Home	Road
Atlanta Braves	96	66	.593	—	56‍–‍25	40‍–‍41
Washington Nationals	86	76	.531	10	47‍–‍34	39‍–‍42
New York Mets	74	88	.457	22	33‍–‍48	41‍–‍40
Philadelphia Phillies	73	89	.451	23	43‍–‍38	30‍–‍51
Miami Marlins	62	100	.383	34	36‍–‍45	26‍–‍55

=== National League Wild Card ===
Division winners
Team	W	L	Pct.
St. Louis Cardinals	97	65	.599
Atlanta Braves	96	66	.593
Los Angeles Dodgers	92	70	.568

Wild Card teams (Top 2 teams qualify for postseason)
Team	W	L	Pct.	GB
Pittsburgh Pirates	94	68	.580	+4
Cincinnati Reds	90	72	.556	—
Washington Nationals	86	76	.531	4
Arizona Diamondbacks	81	81	.500	9
San Francisco Giants	76	86	.469	14
San Diego Padres	76	86	.469	14
Colorado Rockies	74	88	.457	16
New York Mets	74	88	.457	16
Milwaukee Brewers	74	88	.457	16
Philadelphia Phillies	73	89	.451	17
Chicago Cubs	66	96	.407	24
Miami Marlins	62	100	.383	28

== Record vs. opponents ==
2013 National League record Source: MLB Standings Grid – 2013
Team	AZ	ATL	CHC	CIN	COL	LAD	MIA	MIL	NYM	PHI	PIT	SD	SF	STL	WSH	AL
Arizona	—	2–4	4–3	3–4	12–7	10–9	4–2	6–1	3–4	3–4	3–3	7–12	7–12	4–3	2–4	11–9
Atlanta	4–2	—	5–1	4–3	6–1	5–2	13–6	2–4	10–9	11–8	4–3	1–5	3–4	4–3	13–6	11–9
Chicago	3–4	1–5	—	5–14	3–3	1–6	4–3	6–13	3–3	3–3	7–12	3–4	4–3	7–12	3–4	13–7
Cincinnati	4–3	3–4	14–5	—	2–4	4–3	6–1	10–9	4–2	4–2	8–11	3–3	6–1	8–11	3–4	11–9
Colorado	7–12	1–6	3–3	4–2	—	10–9	3–4	4–2	3–4	3–4	4–2	12–7	9–10	3–4	3–4	5–15
Los Angeles	9–10	2–5	6–1	3–4	9–10	—	5–2	4–2	5–1	5–2	4–2	11–8	8–11	4–3	5–1	12–8
Miami	2–4	6–13	3–4	1–6	4–3	2–5	—	1–5	11–8	7–12	2–4	3–4	4–3	2–4	5–14	9–11
Milwaukee	1–6	4–2	13–6	9–10	2–4	2–4	5–1	—	4–3	5–2	7–12	3–4	5–2	5–14	3–4	6–14
New York	4–3	9–10	3–3	2–4	4–3	1–5	8–11	3–4	—	10–9	2–5	4–3	4–2	2–5	7–12	11–9
Philadelphia	4–3	8–11	3–3	2–4	4–3	2–5	12–7	2–5	9–10	—	3–4	4–2	3–3	2–5	8–11	7–13
Pittsburgh	3–3	3–4	12–7	11–8	2–4	2–4	4–2	12–7	5–2	4–3	—	3–4	4–3	10–9	4–3	15–5
San Diego	12–7	5–1	4–3	3–3	7–12	8–11	4–3	4–3	3–4	2–4	4–3	—	8–11	2–4	2–5	8–12
San Francisco	12–7	4–3	3–4	1–6	10–9	11–8	3–4	2–5	2–4	3–3	3–4	11–8	—	2–4	3–3	6–14
St. Louis	3–4	3–4	12–7	11–8	4–3	3–4	4–2	14–5	5–2	5–2	9–10	4–2	4–2	—	6–0	10–10
Washington	4–2	6–13	4–3	4–3	4–3	1–5	14–5	4–3	12–7	11–8	3–4	5–2	3–3	0–6	—	11–9

== Game log ==
Legend
	Marlins win
	Marlins loss
	Postponement
**Bold**	Marlins team member

2013 game log
April (8–19)

#	Date	Opponent	Score	Win	Loss	Save	Attendance	Record	Box/Streak
1	April 1	@ Nationals	0–2	Strasburg (1–0)	**Nolasco** (0–1)	Soriano (1)	45,274	0–1	L1
2	April 3	@ Nationals	0–3	González (1–0)	**Slowey** (0–1)	Soriano (2)	26,269	0–2	L2
3	April 4	@ Nationals	1–6	Zimmermann (1–0)	**LeBlanc** (0–1)		25,123	0–3	L3
4	April 5	@ Mets	7–5	**Sanabia** (1–0)	Hefner (0–1)		24,935	1–3	W1
5	April 6	@ Mets	3–7	Lyon (1–0)	**Webb** (0–1)		28,474	1–4	L1
6	April 7	@ Mets	3–4	Rice (1–0)	**Cishek** (0–1)		29,780	1–5	L2
7	April 8	Braves	0–2	Maholm (2–0)	**Slowey** (0–2)	Kimbrel (3)	34,439	1–6	L3
8	April 9	Braves	2–3	Medlen (1–1)	**LeBlanc** (0–2)	Kimbrel (4)	14,222	1–7	L4
9	April 10	Braves	0–8	Minor (2–0)	**Sanabia** (1–1)		13,810	1–8	L5
10	April 12	Phillies	1–3	Aumont (1–0)	**Rauch** (0–1)	Papelbon (2)	17,923	1–9	L6
11	April 13	Phillies	2–1	**Cishek** (1–1)	Aumont (1–1)		20,037	2–9	W1
12	April 14	Phillies	1–2	Halladay (1–2)	**Rauch** (0–2)	Papelbon (2)	21,412	2–10	L1
13	April 15	Nationals	3–10	Zimmermann (3–0)	**LeBlanc** (0–3)		15,933	2–11	L2
14	April 16	Nationals	8–2	**Sanabia** (2–1)	Haren (1–2)		16,200	3–11	W1
15	April 17	Nationals	1–6	Detwiler (1–0)	**Nolasco** (0–2)		22,302	3–12	L1
16	April 18	@ Reds	1–11	Cingrani (1–0)	**Fernández** (0–1)		14,916	3–13	L2
17	April 19	@ Reds	2–1	**Dunn** (1–0)	Chapman (2–1)	**Cishek** (1)	26,112	4–13	W1
18	April 20	@ Reds	2–3 (13)	Simón (1–1)	**Cishek** (1–2)		35,645	4–14	L1
19	April 21	@ Reds	6–10	Ondrusek (1–0)	**Sanabia** (2–2)		28,882	4–15	L2
20	April 23	@ Twins	3–4	Correia (2–1)	**Fernández** (0–2)	Perkins (6)	25,716	4–16	L3
21	April 23	@ Twins	8–5	**Nolasco** (1–2)	Pelfrey (2–2)	**Cishek** (2)	23,300	5–16	W1
22	April 25	Cubs	3–4	Camp (1–1)	**Cishek** (1–3)	Mármol (2)	15,394	5–17	L1
23	April 26	Cubs	2–4	Feldman (1–3)	**LeBlanc** (0–4)	Gregg (2)	16,017	5–18	L2
24	April 27	Cubs	2–3	Wood (2–1)	**Sanabia** (2–3)	Gregg (3)	27,519	5–19	L3
25	April 28	Cubs	6–4	**Nolasco** (2–2)	Villanueva (1–1)	**Cishek** (3)	19,817	6–19	W1
26	April 29	Mets	4–3	**Rauch** (1–2)	Marcum (0–2)		15,605	7–19	W2
27	April 30	Mets	2–1	**Webb** (1–1)	Hefner (0–3)		15,018	8–19	W3

May (6–22)

#	Date	Opponent	Score	Win	Loss	Save	Attendance	Record	Box
28	May 1	Mets	6–7	Gee (2–4)	**Ramos** (0–1)	Parnell (3)	16,188	8–20	L1
29	May 2	@ Phillies	2–7	Kendrick (3–1)	**Sanabia** (2–4)		36,978	8–21	L2
30	May 3	@ Phillies	1–4	Pettibone (2–0)	**Nolasco** (2–3)	Papelbon (5)	36,292	8–22	L3
31	May 4	@ Phillies	2–0	**Fernández** (1–2)	Hamels (1–4)	**Cishek** (4)	40,091	9–22	W1
32	May 5	@ Phillies	14–2	**Slowey** (1–2)	Halladay (2–4)		45,276	10–22	W2
33	May 6	@ Padres	0–5	Cashner (2–2)	**LeBlanc** (0–5)		14,596	10–23	L1
34	May 7	@ Padres	1–5	Stults (3–2)	**Sanabia** (2–5)		16,263	10–24	L2
35	May 8	@ Padres	0–1	Marquis (4–2)	**Nolasco** (2–4)	Street (8)	16,730	10–25	L3
36	May 10	@ Dodgers	5–4	**Fernández** (2–2)	Belisario (2–4)	**Cishek** (5)	41,721	11–25	W1
37	May 11	@ Dodgers	1–7	Ryu (4–2)	**Slowey** (1–3)		42,208	11–26	L1
38	May 12	@ Dodgers	3–5	Capuano (1–2)	**Koehler** (0–1)		43,959	11–27	L2
39	May 14	Reds	2–6	Bailey (2–3)	**Nolasco** (2–5)		14,694	11–28	L3
40	May 15	Reds	0–4	Leake (3–2)	**Sanabia** (2–6)		14,866	11–29	L4
41	May 16	Reds	3–5	Chapman (3–1)	**Cishek** (1–4)	Hoover (3)	16,680	11–30	L5
42	May 17	Diamondbacks	2–9	Cahill (3–4)	**Slowey** (1–4)		13,444	11–31	L6
43	May 18	Diamondbacks	0–1	McCarthy (1–3)	**Koehler** (0–2)		18,786	11–32	L7
44	May 19	Diamondbacks	2–1	**Nolasco** (3–5)	Miley (3–3)	**Dunn** (1)	20,206	12–32	W1
45	May 20	Phillies	5–1	**Sanabia** (3–6)	Hamels (1–7)		13,231	13–32	W2
46	May 21	Phillies	3–7	Cloyd (1–0)	**Below** (0–1)		13,996	13–33	L1
47	May 22	Phillies	0–3	Lee (5–2)	**Slowey** (1–5)		15,520	13–34	L2
48	May 24	@ White Sox	3–4 (11)	Jones (1–4)	**Webb** (1–2)		20,393	13–35	L3
49	May 25	@ White Sox	1–2	Peavy (6–2)	**Webb** (1–3)		23,705	13–36	L4
50	May 26	@ White Sox	3–5	Axelrod (3–3)	**Sanabia** (3–7)	Reed (17)	25,464	13–37	L5
51	May 27	@ Rays	6–10	McGee (2–2)	**Fernández** (2–3)		13,025	13–38	L6
52	May 28	@ Rays	6–7	Rodney (2–2)	**Dunn** (1–1)		13,876	13–39	L7
53	May 29	Rays	1–3	Hernández (3–5)	**Koehler** (0–3)	Rodney (10)	16,671	13–40	L8
54	May 30	Rays	2–5	Colomé (1–0)	**Nolasco** (3–6)	Rodney (11)	23,199	13–41	L9
55	May 31	Mets	5–1	**Turner** (1–0)	Marcum (0–6)		16,493	14–41	W1

June (15–10)

#	Date	Opponent	Score	Win	Loss	Save	Attendance	Record	Box
56	June 1	Mets	8–1	**Fernández** (3–3)	McHugh (0–1)		16,283	15–41	W2
57	June 2	Mets	11–6	**LeBlanc** (1–5)	Rice (3–4)		18,434	16–41	W3
58	June 3	@ Phillies	2–7	Kendrick (6–3)	**Koehler** (0–4)		35,087	16–42	L1
59	June 4	@ Phillies	3–7	Stutes (1–0)	**Olmos** (0–1)		38,932	16–43	L2
60	June 5	@ Phillies	1–6	Hamels (2–9)	**Ramos** (0–2)		38,643	16–44	L3
–	June 7	@ Mets	Postponed (rain); Rescheduled as traditional doubleheader on September 14						
61	June 8	@ Mets	2–1 (20)	**Slowey** (2–5)	Marcum (0–7)	**Cishek** (6)	20,338	17–44	W1
62	June 9	@ Mets	8–4 (10)	**Qualls** (1–0)	Parnell (4–3)		21,747	18–44	W2
63	June 10	Brewers	1–6	Gallardo (5–6)	**Nolasco** (3–7)		13,259	18–45	L1
64	June 11	Brewers	5–4	**Qualls** (2–0)	Henderson (2–2)	**Cishek** (7)	13,110	19–45	W1
65	June 12	Brewers	1–10	Figaro (1–0)	**Slowey** (2–6)		13,468	19–46	L1
66	June 14	Cardinals	5–4	**Fernández** (4–3)	Westbrook (2–2)	**Cishek** (8)	15,403	20–46	W1
67	June 15	Cardinals	7–13	Lynn (9–1)	**Koehler** (0–5)		16,098	20–47	L1
68	June 16	Cardinals	7–2	**Nolasco** (4–7)	Lyons (2–3)	**Cishek** (9)	18,468	21–47	W1
69	June 17	@ Diamondbacks	3–2	**Dunn** (2–1)	Bell (2–1)	**Cishek** (10)	19,354	22–47	W2
70	June 18	@ Diamondbacks	2–3	Hernandez (3–4)	**Qualls** (2–1)		21,067	22–48	L1
71	June 19	@ Diamondbacks	1–3	Hernandez (4–4)	**Fernández** (4–4)	Bell (13)	26,867	22–49	L2
72	June 20	@ Giants	2–1	**Koehler** (1–5)	Affeldt (1–3)	**Cishek** (11)	41,290	23–49	W1
73	June 21	@ Giants	6–3	**Ramos** (1–2)	Dunning (0–1)	**Cishek** (12)	41,490	24–49	W2
74	June 22	@ Giants	1–2 (11)	Rosario (2–0)	**Dunn** (2–2)		41,683	24–50	L1
75	June 23	@ Giants	7–2	**Eovaldi** (1–0)	Cain (5–4)		41,697	25–50	W1
76	June 25	Twins	4–2	**Ramos** (2–2)	Correia (6–5)	**Cishek** (13)	14,581	26–50	W2
77	June 26	Twins	5–3	**Slowey** (3–6)	Diamond (5–7)	**Cishek** (14)	15,318	27–50	W3
78	June 28	Padres	2–9	Vólquez (6–6)	**Nolasco** (4–8)		18,347	27–51	L1
79	June 29	Padres	7–1	**Turner** (2–0)	Stults (6–6)		19,266	28–51	W1
80	June 30	Padres	6–2	**Cishek** (2–4)	Ross (0–4)		15,929	29–51	W2

July (12–14)

#	Date	Opponent	Score	Win	Loss	Save	Attendance	Record	Box
81	July 1	Padres	4–0	**Fernández** (5–4)	Marquis (9–4)	**Cishek** (15)	14,669	30–51	W3
82	July 2	@ Braves	3–11	Medlen (6–7)	**Jennings** (0–1)		28,045	30–52	L1
83	July 3	@ Braves	6–3	**Nolasco** (5–8)	Minor (8–4)	**Cishek** (16)	26,129	31–52	W1
84	July 4	@ Braves	4–3	**Ramos** (3–2)	Kimbrel (2–2)	**Cishek** (17)	35,465	32–52	W2
85	July 5	@ Cardinals	1–4	Westbrook (5–3)	**Turner** (2–1)	Mujica (22)	46,177	32–53	L1
86	July 6	@ Cardinals	4–5	Mujica (1–1)	**Ramos** (3–3)		45,475	32–54	L2
87	July 7	@ Cardinals	2–3	Lynn (11–3)	**Fernández** (5–5)	Mujica (23)	43,741	32–55	L3
88	July 8	Braves	1–7 (14)	Carpenter (2–0)	**Hatcher** (0–1)		15,745	32–56	L4
89	July 9	Braves	4–6	Teherán (7–4)	**Álvarez** (0–1)	Kimbrel (24)	17,399	32–57	L5
90	July 10	Braves	6–2	**Turner** (3–1)	Maholm (9–8)		23,921	33–57	W1
91	July 12	Nationals	8–3	**Eovaldi** (2–0)	Strasburg (5–7)		16,861	34–57	W2
92	July 13	Nationals	2–1 (10)	**Cishek** (3–4)	Stammen (4–4)		20,057	35–57	W3
93	July 14	Nationals	2–5 (10)	Stammen (5–4)	**Cishek** (3–5)	Soriano (25)	19,766	35–58	L1
–	July 16	**2013 Major League Baseball All-Star Game at Citi Field in Queens, New York**							
94	July 19	@ Brewers	0–2	Lohse (6–7)	**Turner** (3–2)	Rodríguez (10)	30,316	35–59	L2
95	July 20	@ Brewers	0–6	Gallardo (8–8)	**Eovaldi** (2–1)		37,446	35–60	L3
96	July 21	@ Brewers	0–1 (13)	Axford (4–3)	**Webb** (1–4)		30,073	35–61	L4
97	July 22	@ Rockies	3–1	**Koehler** (2–5)	Pomeranz (0–4)	**Cishek** (18)	31,913	36–61	W1
98	July 23	@ Rockies	4–2	**Fernández** (6–5)	Chacín (9–5)	**Cishek** (19)	34,223	37–61	W2
99	July 24	@ Rockies	1–2	De la Rosa (10–5)	**Turner** (3–3)	Brothers (6)	30,900	37–62	L1
100	July 25	@ Rockies	5–3	**Jennings** (1–1)	Ottavino (0–2)	**Cishek** (20)	33,165	38–62	W1
101	July 26	Pirates	2–0	**Álvarez** (1–1)	Locke (9–3)	**Cishek** (21)	18,718	39–62	W2
102	July 27	Pirates	4–7	Morton (3–2)	**Koehler** (2–6)	Melancon (4)	22,410	39–63	L1
103	July 28	Pirates	3–2	**Fernández** (7–5)	Cole (5–4)	**Cishek** (22)	24,207	40–63	W1
104	July 29	Mets	5–6	Aardsma (2–0)	**Ramos** (3–4)	Parnell (21)	19,343	40–64	L1
105	July 30	Mets	2–4 (10)	Atchison (1–0)	**Cishek** (3–6)	Parnell (22)	23,408	40–65	L2
106	July 31	Mets	3–2	**Álvarez** (2–1)	Mejía (1–1)	**Dunn** (2)	18,714	41–65	W1

August (8–20)

#	Date	Opponent	Score	Win	Loss	Save	Attendance	Record	Box
107	August 1	Mets	3–0	**Koehler** (3–6)	Harvey (8–3)	**Cishek** (23)	25,916	42–65	W2
108	August 2	Indians	10–0	**Fernández** (8–5)	Jiménez (8–6)		17,731	43–65	W3
109	August 3	Indians	3–4	Allen (5–1)	**Jennings** (1–2)	Perez (16)	22,997	43–66	L1
110	August 4	Indians	0–2	Kazmir (7–4)	**Eovaldi** (2–2)	Perez (17)	25,077	43–67	L2
111	August 6	@ Pirates	3–4	Morris (5–4)	**Dunn** (2–3)		27,907	43–68	L3
112	August 7	@ Pirates	2–4	Morton (4–3)	**Koehler** (3–7)	Melancon (7)	28,173	43–69	L4
113	August 8	@ Pirates	4–5 (10)	Hughes (2–2)	**Ames** (0–1)		33,646	43–70	L5
114	August 9	@ Braves	0–5	Beachy (1–0)	**Turner** (3–4)		37,424	43–71	L6
115	August 10	@ Braves	1–0	**Dunn** (3–3)	Walden (4–2)	**Cishek** (24)	42,177	44–71	W1
116	August 11	@ Braves	4–9	Minor (12–5)	**Jennings** (1–3)		32,881	44–72	L1
117	August 12	@ Royals	2–6	Davis (6–9)	**Koehler** (3–8)		15,956	44–73	L2
118	August 13	@ Royals	1–0 (10)	**Qualls** (3–1)	Herrera (4–6)	**Cishek** (25)	21,094	45–73	W1
119	August 14	@ Royals	5–2	**Jennings** (2–3)	Collins (2–6)	**Cishek** (26)	17,760	46–73	W2
120	August 16	Giants	10–14	Rosario (3–0)	**Eovaldi** (2–3)		26,166	46–74	L1
121	August 17	Giants	4–6	Cain (8–8)	**Álvarez** (2–2)	Romo (30)	24,653	46–75	L2
122	August 18	Giants	6–5	**Qualls** (4–1)	Rosario (3–1)	**Cishek** (27)	23,113	47–75	W1
123	August 19	Dodgers	6–2	**Fernández** (9–5)	Ryu (12–4)		27,127	48–75	W2
124	August 20	Dodgers	4–6	Withrow (2–0)	**Jennings** (2–4)	Jansen (20)	25,690	48–76	L1
125	August 21	Dodgers	1–4	Greinke (12–3)	**Eovaldi** (2–4)	Jansen (21)	24,996	48–77	L2
126	August 22	Dodgers	0–6	Kershaw (13–7)	**Álvarez** (2–3)		25,609	48–78	L3
127	August 23	Rockies	2–3	Chacín (12–7)	**Qualls** (4–2)	Brothers (12)	19,253	48–79	L4
128	August 24	Rockies	3–0	**Fernández** (10–5)	Manship (0–4)	**Cishek** (28)	23,333	49–79	W1
129	August 25	Rockies	3–4	de la Rosa (14–6)	**Turner** (3–5)	Brothers (13)	20,191	49–80	L1
130	August 27	@ Nationals	1–2	Ohlendorf (3–0)	**Eovaldi** (2–5)	Soriano (34)	24,616	49–81	L2
131	August 28	@ Nationals	3–4	Storen (4–2)	**Dunn** (3–4)	Soriano (35)	24,394	49–82	L3
132	August 29	@ Nationals	0–9	Gonzalez (8–6)	**Koehler** (3–9)		27,374	49–83	L4
133	August 30	@ Braves	1–2	Teherán (11–7)	**Fernández** (10–6)	Varvaro (1)	28,255	49–84	L5
134	August 31	@ Braves	4–5 (11)	Ayala (2–1)	**Webb** (1–5)		32,727	49–85	L6

September (13–15)

#	Date	Opponent	Score	Win	Loss	Save	Attendance	Record	Box
135	September 1	@ Braves	7–0	**Eovaldi** (3–5)	Wood (3–3)		38,441	50–85	W1
136	September 2	@ Cubs	4–3	**Álvarez** (3–3)	Wood (8–11)	**Cishek** (29)	26,978	51–85	W2
137	September 3	@ Cubs	6–2	**Webb** (2–5)	Jackson (7–15)		30,024	52–85	W3
138	September 4	@ Cubs	7–9	Villanueva (4–8)	**Webb** (2–6)	Gregg (29)	20,696	52–86	L1
139	September 6	Nationals	7–0	**Fernández** (11–6)	Haren (8–13)		25,118	53–86	W1
140	September 7	Nationals	2–9	Roark (5–0)	**Eovaldi** (3–6)		28,336	53–87	L1
141	September 8	Nationals	4–6	Strasburg (7–9)	**Turner** (3–6)	Soriano (39)	18,990	53–88	L2
142	September 9	Braves	2–5	Medlen (13–12)	**Álvarez** (3–4)	Kimbrel (45)	18,503	53–89	L3
143	September 10	Braves	3–4	Teherán (12–7)	**Koehler** (3–10)	Kimbrel (46)	19,095	53–90	L4
144	September 11	Braves	5–2	**Fernández** (12–6)	Minor (13–7)		25,111	54–90	W1
145	September 12	Braves	1–6	García (4–6)	**Flynn** (0–1)		15,274	54–91	L1
146	September 13	@ Mets	3–4	Niese (7–7)	**Hand** (0–1)	Hawkins (9)	20,562	54–92	L2
147	September 14 (1)	@ Mets	3–0	**Álvarez** (4–4)	Torres (3–5)	**Cishek** (30)	see 2nd game	55–92	W1
148	September 14 (2)	@ Mets	1–3	Matsuzaka (1–3)	**Turner** (3–7)	Hawkins (10)	25,175	55–93	L1
149	September 15	@ Mets	0–1	Black (1–0)	**Phillips** (0–1)		25,165	55–94	L2
150	September 16	@ Phillies	2–12	Lee (14–6)	**Dyson** (0–1)		31,266	55–95	L3
151	September 17	@ Phillies	4–6	Halladay (4–4)	**Flynn** (0–2)	Papelbon (28)	28,872	55–96	L4
152	September 18	@ Phillies	4–3 (10)	**Hand** (1–1)	Jiménez (1–1)	**Cishek** (31)	28,908	56–96	W1
153	September 19	@ Nationals	2–3	Gonzalez (11–7)	**Álvarez** (4–5)	Soriano (42)	25,945	56–97	L1
154	September 20	@ Nationals	0–8	Zimmermann (19–8)	**Turner** (3–8)		34,752	56–98	L2
–	September 21	@ Nationals	Postponed (rain); Rescheduled as day-night doubleheader on September 22						
155	September 22 (1)	@ Nationals	4–2	**Koehler** (4–10)	Haren (9–14)	**Cishek** (32)	35,101	57–98	W1
156	September 22 (2)	@ Nationals	4–5	Soriano (3–3)	**Dyson** (0–2)		34,824	57–99	L1
157	September 23	Phillies	4–0	**Eovaldi** (4–6)	Halladay (4–5)		18,627	58–99	W1
158	September 24	Phillies	1–2	Stutes (3–1)	**Álvarez** (4–6)	Papelbon (29)	19,375	58–100	L1
159	September 25	Phillies	3–2	**Qualls** (5–2)	Martin (2–5)	**Cishek** (33)	19,180	59–100	W1
160	September 27	Tigers	3–2	**Koehler** (5–10)	Álvarez (1–5)	**Cishek** (34)	26,992	60–100	W2
161	September 28	Tigers	2–1 (10)	**Cishek** (4–6)	Reed (0–1)		28,750	61–100	W3
162	September 29	Tigers	1–0	**Álvarez** (5–6)	Putkonen (1–3)		28,315	62–100	W4

== Roster ==
2013 Miami Marlins
Roster
Pitchers: 37 Henderson Álvarez; 57 Steve Ames; 64 Duane Below; 49 Arquímedes Caminero; 31 Steve Cishek; 40 Mike Dunn; 36 Sam Dyson; 24 Nathan Eovaldi; 16 José Fernández; 35 Brian Flynn; 52 Brad Hand; 39 Chris Hatcher; 43 Dan Jennings; 34 Tom Koehler; 23 Wade LeBlanc; 73 John Maine; 47 Ricky Nolasco; 67 Edgar Olmos; 56 Zach Phillips; 50 Chad Qualls; 44 A. J. Ramos; 60 Jon Rauch; 28 Alex Sanabia; 45 Kevin Slowey; 33 Jacob Turner; 58 Ryan Webb	Catchers: 19 Rob Brantly; 46 Koyie Hill; 6 Jeff Mathis; 21 Miguel Olivo; 53 Kyle Skipworth; Infielders: 51 Derek Dietrich; 29 Greg Dobbs; 22 Nick Green; 3 Adeiny Hechavarria; 18 Casey Kotchman; 59 Ed Lucas; 25 Joe Mahoney; 5 Logan Morrison; 30 Plácido Polanco; 17 Donovan Solano; 13 Chris Valaika; 12 Gil Velazquez	Outfielders: 8 Chris Coghlan; 32 Matt Diaz; 26 Austin Kearns; 23 Jake Marisnick; 48 Marcell Ozuna; 9 Juan Pierre; 20 Justin Ruggiano; 27 Giancarlo Stanton; 21 Christian Yelich; Other batters: 54 Jordan Brown	Manager: 11 Mike Redmond; Coaches: 38 Reid Cornelius (bullpen); 4 Joey Espada (third base); 55 Chuck Hernandez (pitching); 7 Perry Hill (first base); 41 Rob Leary (bench); 10 Tino Martinez (hitting); 47 John Pierson (hitting); 75 Jeff Urgelles (bullpen catcher)

== 2013 player stats ==
=== Batting ===
Note: G = Games played; AB = At bats; R = Runs scored; H = Hits; 2B = Doubles; 3B = Triples; HR = Home runs; RBI = Runs batted in; AVG = Batting average; SB = Stolen bases

Player	G	AB	R	H	2B	3B	HR	RBI	AVG	SB
Henderson Álvarez, P	17	30	2	9	3	0	1	6	.300	0
Rob Brantly, C	67	223	11	47	9	0	1	18	.211	0
Jordan Brown, LF	14	15	0	3	1	0	0	5	.200	0
Chris Coghlan, OF	70	195	10	50	10	3	1	10	.256	2
Derek Dietrich, 2B	57	215	32	46	10	2	9	23	.214	1
Matt Diaz, LF	10	18	1	3	1	0	0	1	.167	0
Greg Dobbs, 1B	114	237	21	54	11	0	2	22	.228	1
Sam Dyson, P	5	1	0	0	0	0	0	0	.000	0
Nathan Eovaldi, P	18	31	1	2	0	0	0	1	.065	0
José Fernández, P	25	50	5	11	1	1	1	5	.220	0
Brian Flynn, P	4	5	0	2	0	0	0	0	.400	0
Nick Green, 2B	18	55	4	13	2	0	1	6	.236	0
Brad Hand, P	7	4	0	0	0	0	0	0	.000	0
Adeiny Hechavarria, SS	148	543	30	123	14	8	3	42	.227	11
Koyie Hill, C	18	58	3	9	2	0	0	0	.155	0
Austin Kearns, RF	19	27	3	5	0	0	0	0	.185	0
Tom Koehler, P	27	39	1	3	0	0	0	0	.077	0
Casey Kotchman, 1B	6	20	0	0	0	0	0	1	.000	0
Wade LeBlanc, P	12	12	1	2	0	0	0	0	.167	0
Ed Lucas, 3B	94	351	43	90	14	1	4	28	.256	1
Joe Mahoney, 1B	9	29	2	8	1	0	1	4	.276	0
Jake Marisnick, CF	40	109	6	20	2	1	1	5	.183	3
Jeff Mathis, C	73	232	14	42	7	1	5	29	.181	0
Logan Morrison, 1B	85	293	32	71	13	4	6	36	.242	0
Ricky Nolasco, P	16	30	1	3	1	0	0	0	.100	0
Miguel Olivo, C	33	74	5	15	2	0	4	9	.203	0
Marcell Ozuna, RF, CF	70	275	31	73	17	4	3	32	.265	5
Juan Pierre, LF	113	308	36	76	11	2	1	8	.247	23
Plácido Polanco, 3B	118	377	33	98	13	0	1	23	.260	2
Justin Ruggiano, CF	128	424	49	94	18	1	18	50	.222	15
Alex Sanabia, P	9	16	1	1	0	0	0	0	.063	0
Kyle Skipworth, C	4	3	0	0	0	0	0	0	.000	0
Kevin Slowey, P	19	21	1	1	0	0	0	0	.048	0
Donovan Solano, 2B	102	361	33	90	13	1	3	34	.249	3
Giancarlo Stanton, RF	116	425	62	106	26	0	24	62	.249	1
Jacob Turner, P	19	35	0	3	0	1	0	0	.086	0
Chris Valaika, 3B	22	64	4	14	5	0	1	9	.219	0
Gil Velazquez, 3B	1	1	0	0	0	0	0	0	.000	0
Ryan Webb, P	61	3	1	1	0	0	0	0	.333	0
Christian Yelich, OF	62	240	34	69	12	1	4	16	.288	10
Team totals	162	5449	513	1257	219	31	95	485	.231	78

=== Pitching ===
Note: W = Wins; L = Losses; ERA = Earned run average; G = Games pitched; GS = Games started; SV = Saves; IP = Innings pitched; H = Hits allowed; R = Runs allowed; ER = Earned runs allowed; BB = Walks allowed; K = Strikeouts

Player	W	L	ERA	G	GS	SV	IP	H	R	ER	BB	K
Henderson Álvarez	5	6	3.59	17	17	0	102.2	90	42	41	27	57
Steve Ames	0	1	4.50	4	0	0	4.0	6	2	2	2	4
Duane Below	0	1	10.12	2	0	0	2.2	6	3	3	2	2
Arquimedes Caminero	0	0	2.77	13	0	0	13.0	10	4	4	3	12
Steve Cishek	4	6	2.33	69	0	34	69.2	53	19	18	22	74
Mike Dunn	3	4	2.66	75	0	2	67.2	53	21	20	28	72
Sam Dyson	0	2	9.00	5	1	0	11.0	16	12	11	5	5
Nathan Eovaldi	4	6	3.39	18	18	0	106.1	100	44	40	40	78
José Fernández	12	6	2.19	28	28	0	172.2	111	47	42	58	187
Brian Flynn	0	2	8.50	4	4	0	18.0	27	17	17	13	15
Brad Hand	1	1	3.05	7	2	0	20.2	13	7	7	8	15
Chris Hatcher	0	1	12.46	7	0	0	8.2	13	13	12	4	7
Dan Jennings	2	4	3.76	47	0	0	40.2	39	17	17	16	38
Tom Koehler	5	10	4.41	29	23	0	143.0	140	72	70	54	92
Wade LeBlanc	1	5	5.18	13	7	0	48.2	63	30	28	15	31
John Maine	0	0	12.27	4	0	0	7.1	15	10	10	5	7
Ricky Nolasco	5	8	3.85	18	18	0	112.1	112	50	48	25	90
Edgar Olmos	0	1	7.20	5	0	0	5.0	7	9	4	3	2
Zach Phillips	0	1	5.40	3	0	0	1.2	3	1	1	3	1
Chad Qualls	5	2	2.61	66	0	0	62.0	57	18	18	19	49
A. J. Ramos	3	4	3.15	68	0	0	80.0	58	32	28	43	86
Jon Rauch	1	2	7.56	15	0	0	16.2	23	14	14	7	15
Alex Sanabia	3	7	4.88	10	10	0	55.1	69	33	30	25	31
Kevin Slowey	3	6	4.11	20	14	0	92.0	106	44	42	18	76
Jacob Turner	3	8	3.74	20	20	0	118.0	116	55	49	54	77
Ryan Webb	2	6	2.91	66	0	0	80.1	70	30	26	27	54
Team totals	62	100	3.71	162	162	36	1460.0	1376	646	602	526	1177

== Farm system ==
Level	Team	League	Manager
AAA	New Orleans Zephyrs	Pacific Coast League	Ron Hassey
AA	Jacksonville Suns	Southern League	Andy Barkett
A	Jupiter Hammerheads	Florida State League	Andy Haines
A	Greensboro Grasshoppers	South Atlantic League	Jorge Hernández
A-Short Season	Batavia Muckdogs	New York–Penn League	Ángel Espada
Rookie	GCL Marlins	Gulf Coast League	Julio Garcia
