= Mike Dunn (baseball) =

American baseball pitcher (born 1985)

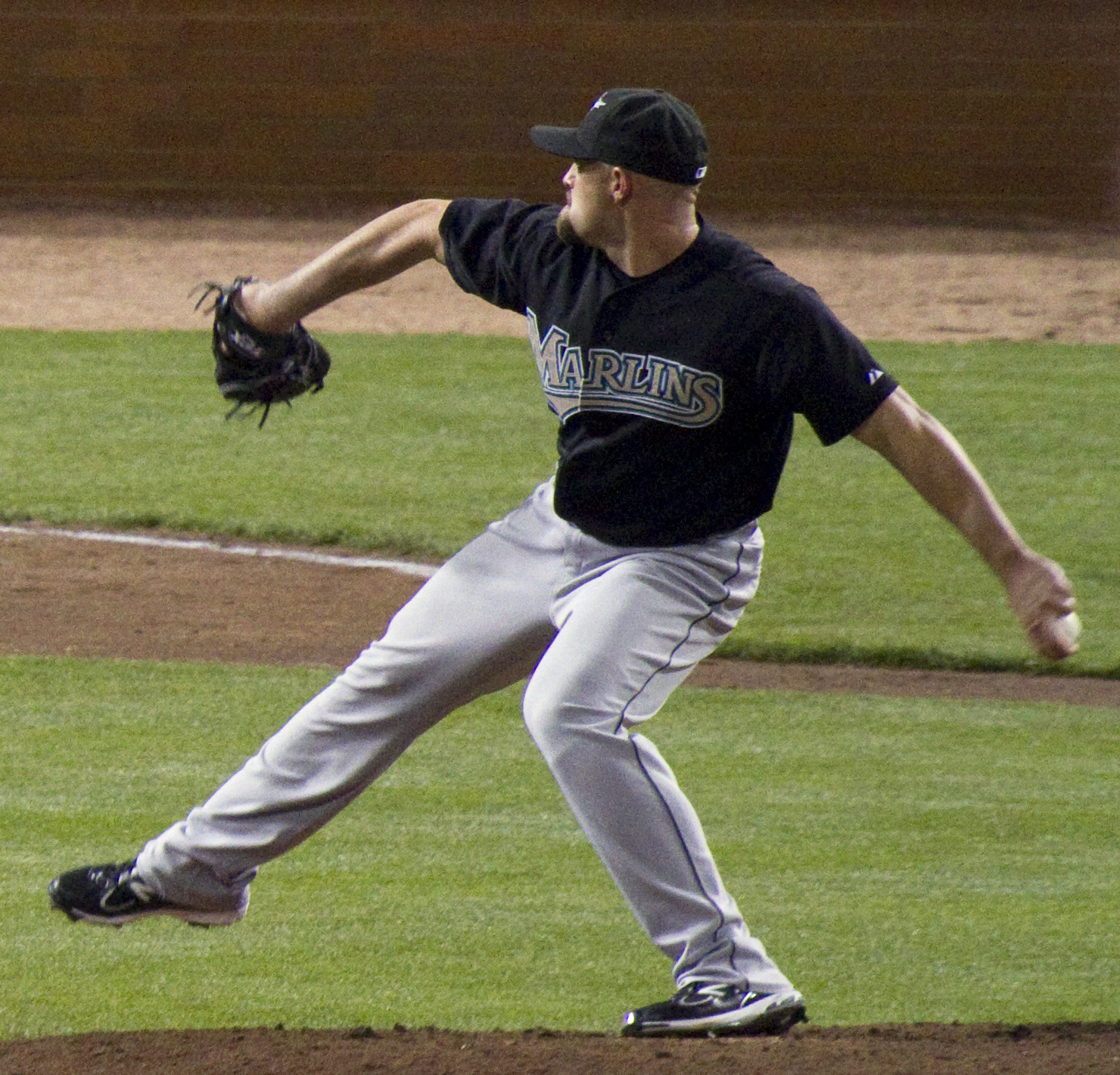
- Dunn with the Florida Marlins in 2011
- Pitcher
- Born: May 23, 1985 (age 41); Farmington, New Mexico, U.S.
- Batted: Left Threw: Left

MLB debut
- September 4, 2009, for the New York Yankees

Last MLB appearance
- June 14, 2019, for the Colorado Rockies

MLB statistics
- Win–loss record: 34–26
- Earned run average: 4.00
- Strikeouts: 473
- Stats at Baseball Reference

Teams
- New York Yankees (2009); Atlanta Braves (2010); Florida / Miami Marlins (2011–2016); Colorado Rockies (2017–2019)

Michael Glen Dunn (born May 23, 1985) is an American former professional baseball pitcher. He played in Major League Baseball (MLB) for the New York Yankees, Atlanta Braves, Florida / Miami Marlins, and Colorado Rockies.

== Career ==
Dunn grew up in Farmington, New Mexico, near the four corners. For his senior year of high school, he transferred to Cimarron-Memorial High School in Las Vegas so more scouts could see him play. He was drafted by the Houston Astros in 14th round (419th overall) of the 2003 Major League Baseball draft, but did not sign.

Dunn attended the College of Southern Nevada from 2003 to 2005. His uniform number was retired in 2011.

=== New York Yankees ===
He was drafted by the New York Yankees in the 33rd round (999th overall) of the 2004 Major League Baseball draft and signed.

Dunn was initially an outfielder, but the Yankees converted him into a pitcher. He made his minor league debut in 2006, pitching for both the GCL Yankees and the Staten Island Yankees. Dunn spent the entire 2007 season with the Charleston RiverDogs, going 12–5 with a 3.42 ERA.

Dunn spent the majority of the 2008 season in single A, playing for the Tampa Yankees, going 4–7 in 30 games. He also played in 1 game in 2008 with the Trenton Thunder Double-A team.

Dunn was added to the Yankees' 40-man roster following the 2008 season to protect him from the Rule 5 draft. He pitched to a 3.71 ERA in 53.1 innings for Trenton and was a Mid-Season All-Star. After reaching Triple-A, he held a 2.25 ERA in 12 games for the Scranton/Wilkes-Barre Yankees.

On September 1, Dunn was called up for the first time. He made his major league debut on September 4, against the Toronto Blue Jays, and pitched in three other games before the end of the year. Dunn pitched in the Arizona Fall League for the Surprise Rafters after the season. He was included in the AFL Rising Stars Game after striking out 20 batters in 10.1 innings.

=== Atlanta Braves ===
On December 22, 2009, the New York Yankees traded Dunn, OF Melky Cabrera and pitching prospect Arodys Vizcaíno to re-acquire Javier Vázquez from the Braves with LHP Boone Logan.

He started the season with the Gwinnett Braves in Triple-A, pitching to a 1.05 ERA with 56 strikeouts and seven saves in 42.2 innings before being called up on July 15 when left-handed reliever Eric O'Flaherty was placed on the disabled list. He allowed no runs in 11 games but was optioned when O'Flaherty returned on August 20. Dunn was recalled again when rosters expanded on September 1. He allowed four runs on 11 hits and six walks while striking 19 in 10.2 innings to close out the season.

=== Florida/Miami Marlins ===
On November 16, 2010, Dunn was traded to the Florida Marlins with Omar Infante for Dan Uggla. He made the Marlins opening day roster to start the 2011 season. Dunn compiled a 3.43 ERA with 68 strikeouts in 63 innings.

Dunn was included on the opening day roster in 2012, the team's first season in Miami. After allowing six earned runs on eight hits and six walks, he was option to Triple-A New Orleans to make room for Dan Jennings on the active roster. He returned on May 11, but was sent down again on May 24 after only four appearances. He was called up again on June 21, and pitched to a 3.48 ERA in 33.2 innings through the remainder of the season.

In 2013, Dunn was on the Marlins' opening day roster. He stayed with the team all year and compiled a 2.66 ERA in 67.2 innings. Dunn also made the team out of spring training in 2014. By mid-August, he led the team in wins with 10. In September, Dunn was recognized for his work with the media and local community when he received the Good Guy Award from the Baseball Writers Association of America. He closed out the year pitching to a 3.36 ERA in 57 innings.

On February 8, 2015, Dunn and the Marlins agreed to a $5.8 million, two-year contract. That year, he pitched to a 4.50 ERA in 54 innings. Dunn started the 2016 on the disabled list with a forearm strain. He returned to the Marlins on May 31. Dunn pitched to a 3.40 ERA in 42.1 innings through the end of the season.

=== Colorado Rockies ===
On December 15, 2016, Dunn signed a three-year, $19 million contract with the Colorado Rockies. He had a strong start to the 2017 season, pitching to a 1.17 ERA in 7.2 innings before hitting the disabled list with back spasms on April 26. He returned on May 3 and compiled a 5.06 ERA in his 58 outings after returning from injury. By mid-August, Dunn was relegated to mop-up duty and was left off the Rockies' playoff roster. On September 25, 2017, Dunn made his 500th appearance in a 5–4 loss to the Miami Marlins. In his first season in Colorado, he pitched in 68 games, managing a 4.47 ERA in 50 1/3 innings.

Dunn started the 2018 season with a 9.00 ERA in 16 innings through June 7. He then hit the disabled list with a shoulder strain. Dunn returned on June 27 and pitched in two games before returning to the disabled list on July 7 with a AC joint strain. He underwent season-ending surgery.

In 2019, Dunn pitched to a 5.19 ERA through 27 games to start the season. He was placed on the injured list with elbow inflammation on June 6. He was activated on June 13 and then allowed four runs on four hits in his first game back on June 14. On June 19, the Rockies designated Dunn for assignment. He was 1–0 with a 7.13 ERA in 28 games. He was released on June 21.

=== Retirement ===
On February 4, 2020, Dunn announced his retirement. He retired in order to spend more time with his family. Since retiring, Dunn has gone on to serve as an assistant coach with the College of Southern Nevada baseball team.
