= Jacob Turner =

American baseball player (born 1991)

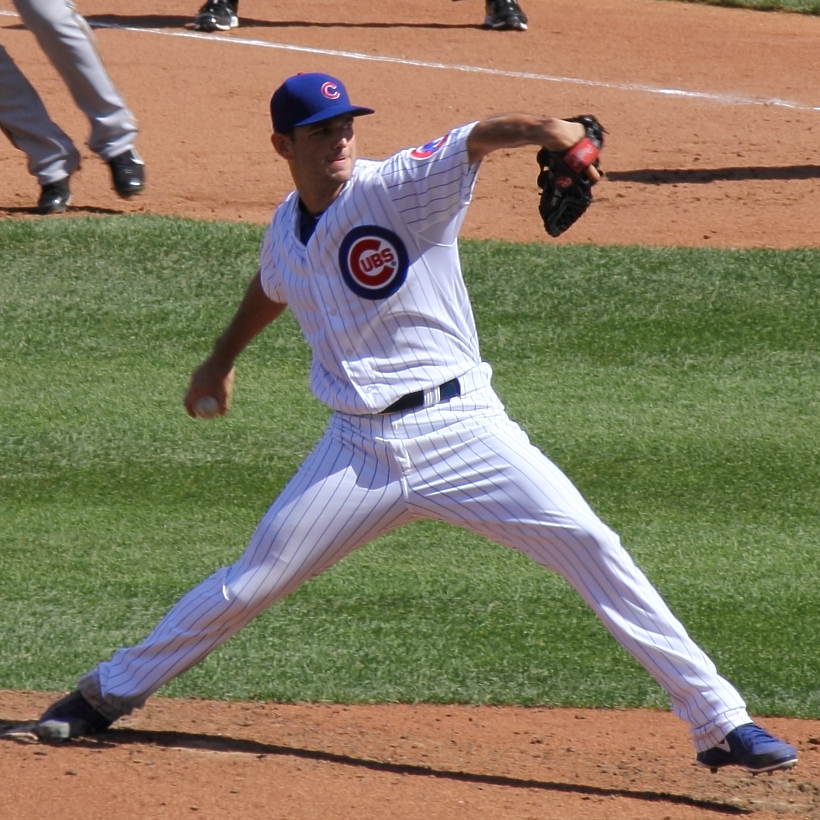
- Turner with the Chicago Cubs
- Pitcher
- Born: May 21, 1991 (age 35); St. Charles, Missouri, U.S.
- Batted: Right Threw: Right

Professional debut
- MLB: July 30, 2011, for the Detroit Tigers
- KBO: March 24, 2019, for the Kia Tigers

Last appearance
- MLB: August 7, 2018, for the Detroit Tigers
- KBO: July 27, 2019, for the Kia Tigers

MLB statistics
- Win–loss record: 14–31
- Earned run average: 5.37
- Strikeouts: 236

KBO statistics
- Win–loss record: 4–10
- Earned run average: 5.56
- Strikeouts: 95
- Stats at Baseball Reference

Teams
- Detroit Tigers (2011–2012); Miami Marlins (2012–2014); Chicago Cubs (2014); Chicago White Sox (2016); Washington Nationals (2017); Miami Marlins (2018); Detroit Tigers (2018); Kia Tigers (2019)
Medals
Men's baseball
Representing United States
World Junior Baseball Championship
Silver medal – second place	2008 Edmonton	Team

Jacob Edward Turner (born May 21, 1991) is an American former professional baseball pitcher. He played in Major League Baseball (MLB) for the Detroit Tigers, Miami Marlins, Chicago Cubs, Chicago White Sox, and Washington Nationals. He also played in the KBO League for the Kia Tigers.

== High school career ==
During his career playing for Westminster Christian Academy in Town and Country, Missouri, Turner compiled a win–loss record of 20–4 as well as two saves and 187 strikeouts. Turner, who could throw 91 miles per hour (146 km/h) during his freshman year in high school, reached 98 miles per hour (158 km/h) in his senior year. He worked with former Major League Baseball (MLB) pitcher Todd Worrell, and also received coaching from former MLB catcher Mike Matheny while at Westminster.

Before the 2009 MLB Draft, Turner committed to play college baseball for North Carolina under head coach Mike Fox.

== Professional career ==
=== Detroit Tigers ===
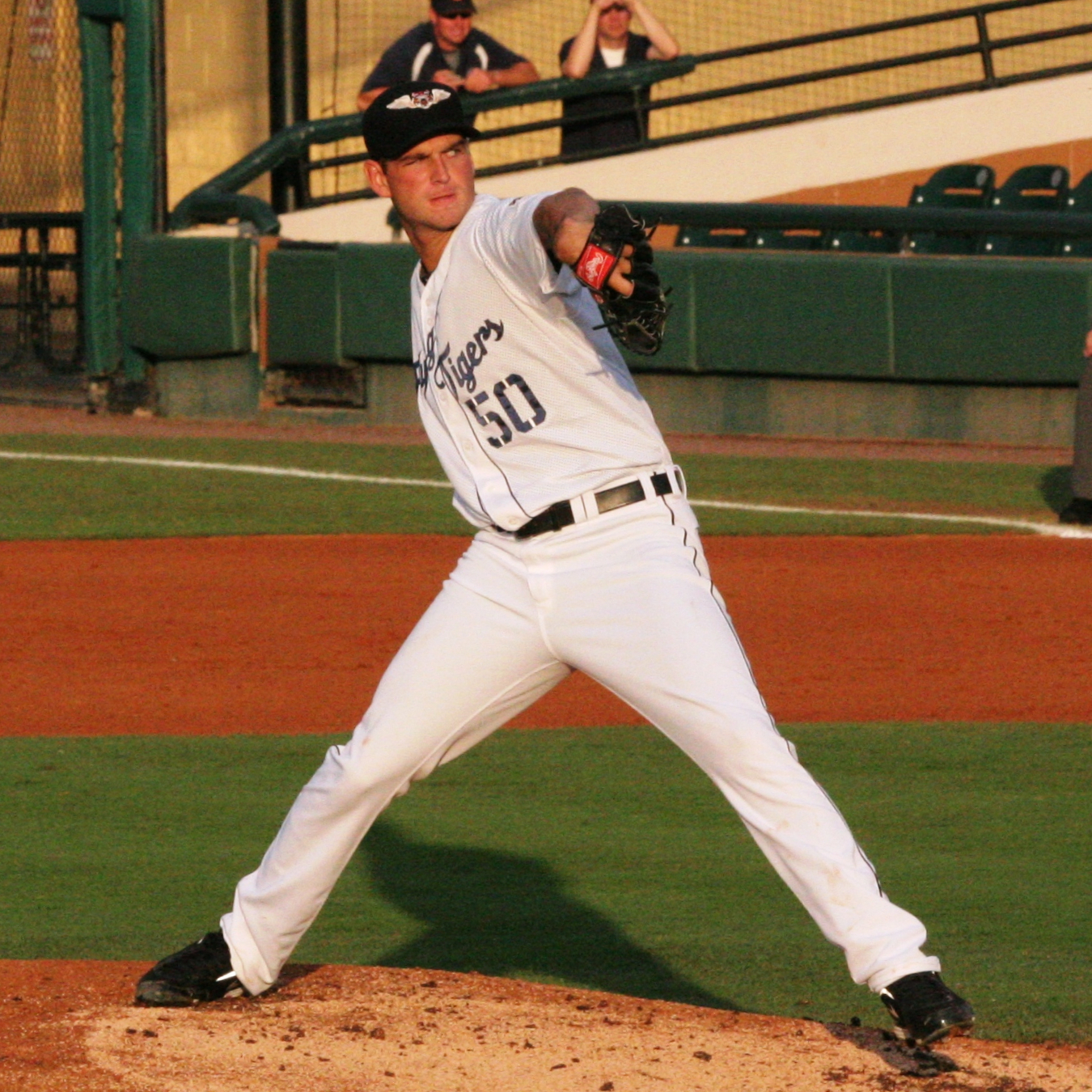
Turner pitching for the Lakeland Flying Tigers in 2012

Turner was drafted ninth overall, in the first round of 2009 Major League Baseball draft by the Detroit Tigers. Turner signed a major-league contract with the Tigers for a guaranteed $5.5 million, with the potential to reach $7 million. Turner was represented by sports agent Scott Boras. He was placed on the Detroit Tigers 40-man roster in November 2009.

Prior to the 2010 season, Turner was named the 26th best prospect in baseball according to Baseball America. The same publication listed Turner as the No. 1 prospect in the Tigers system.

Turner began his career with the Tigers' minor league A-level affiliate West Michigan Whitecaps. On June 23, 2010, Turner was promoted to the Tigers' high A affiliate, the Lakeland Flying Tigers.

Turner began the 2011 season at the Tigers' Double-A affiliate, the Erie SeaWolves. He was named the No. 1 Tigers prospect by Baseball America, who also stated he had the best curveball and changeup in the system. Overall, Turner was listed as the 21st-best prospect in baseball by Baseball America, and the 15th best by MLB.com On July 30, 2011, Turner was recalled to replace Charlie Furbush, who was traded to the Seattle Mariners. He was sent down to the minor leagues after his debut, but brought back up to the major-league club when rosters expanded to 40 players on September 1.

=== Miami Marlins ===
On July 23, 2012, the Tigers traded Turner, Rob Brantly, and Brian Flynn to the Miami Marlins for Aníbal Sánchez and Omar Infante. During the rest of the 2012 season, Turner compiled a 1–4 record with a 3.38 ERA, 0.98 WHIP and 29 strikeouts in seven starts (42.2 innings).

Turner posted a 3.74 ERA in 20 starts for the 2013 Marlins, but only went 3–8 as his team finished dead last in runs scored that season. After pitching to a 4–7 record and a 5.97 ERA in 20 games in 2014, he was designated for assignment on August 5, 2014.

=== Chicago Cubs ===
On August 8, 2014, the Chicago Cubs acquired Turner from the Marlins for two minor league relief pitchers. He pitched in eight games with the Cubs, with a 2–4 record and 6.49 ERA.

Turner was diagnosed with a flexor strain and bone bruise on March 10, 2015, and placed on the disabled list six days later. He was moved to the 60-day disabled list on April 19.

=== Chicago White Sox ===
On October 27, 2015, Turner was claimed off waivers by the Chicago White Sox. On December 2, they did not tender him a contract for the 2016 season, making him a free agent. Two days later, he re-signed with the White Sox on a one-year contract for $1.5 million. He was sent outright to Triple-A on March 28. After left handed starter Carlos Rodon landed on the disabled list, the White Sox called up Turner to take his spot in the rotation on July 17. After allowing 12 runs in 2 starts for Chicago, Turner was sent to the bullpen. He was removed from the 40–man roster and sent outright to the Triple–A Charlotte Knights on October 5. Turner elected free agency following the season on November 7.

=== Washington Nationals ===
On December 13, 2016, Turner signed a minor league contract that included an invitation to spring training with the Washington Nationals. He did not make the Opening Day roster but had his contract purchased from the Class-AAA Syracuse Chiefs of the International League for a spot start against the Colorado Rockies on April 24. Turner remained with the team, transitioning to a bullpen role. He earned his first win with the Nationals on May 3, pitching four scoreless innings in relief against the Arizona Diamondbacks.

The Nationals designated Turner for assignment on July 1, 2017, after he gave up five runs in 3 2/3 innings against the St. Louis Cardinals in relief. In total, Turner posted a 5.08 ERA in his first stint with the Nationals, striking out just over five batters per nine innings. After Turner was outrighted to Syracuse, he joined the pitching rotation there until the Nationals again selected his contract July 17, 2017, to serve as a long relief option while they awaited the activation of newly acquired relievers Sean Doolittle and Ryan Madson. He was called up again, on July 17, 2017, to provide pitching depth. He was once again DFA'd on July 18, 2017, without making an appearance for the team. He cleared waivers and was sent outright to Triple-A Syracuse Chiefs the next day. He elected free agency following the season on October 16.

=== Miami Marlins (second stint) ===
On December 19, 2017, Turner signed a minor league contract with the Miami Marlins. The deal included an invitation to spring training. His contract was purchased by the Marlins on March 29, 2018, and he was assigned to the Opening Day roster. He was designated for assignment on April 8, 2018. Turner cleared waivers and was outrighted to Triple-A New Orleans Baby Cakes. He was released from the organization on June 2, 2018.

=== Detroit Tigers (second stint) ===
On June 5, 2018, Turner signed a minor league contract with the Detroit Tigers. Turner's minor league contract was purchased by the Tigers on August 7, 2018, when he started in place of Mike Fiers, who had been traded to the Oakland Athletics the day before. In his first start for the Tigers, he allowed seven runs, five of which were earned-runs, on six hits in just one inning. He was designated for assignment by the Tigers on August 10. After clearing waivers, Turner was sent outright to the Toledo Mud Hens on August 13, 2018. The Tigers had intended to purchase Turner's minor league contract six days later and have him start on August 19, 2018, due to injuries but MLB rules state a player has to wait ten days after being designated for assignment before being called up. He declared free agency on October 3, 2018.

=== Kia Tigers ===
On November 18, 2018, Turner signed with the Kia Tigers of the KBO League. He became a free agent following the 2019 season.

== Pitching style ==
Turner threw four main pitches: a four-seam fastball (90–93 mph), a sinking two-seam fastball (89–93), a curveball (78–80) and a slider (84–86). He also used a rare changeup (85–87), almost exclusively against left-handed hitters. He often relied upon the curveball with two strikes in the count.
