= Omar Infante =

Venezuelan baseball player (born 1981)

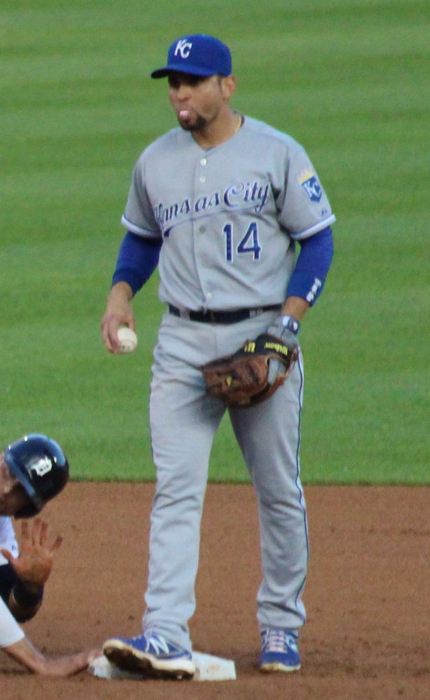
- Infante with the Kansas City Royals in 2014
- Second baseman
- Born: December 26, 1981 (age 44); Puerto la Cruz, Anzoátegui, Venezuela
- Batted: Right Threw: Right

MLB debut
- September 7, 2002, for the Detroit Tigers

Last MLB appearance
- June 6, 2016, for the Kansas City Royals

MLB statistics
- Batting average: .271
- Home runs: 82
- Runs batted in: 542
- Stats at Baseball Reference

Teams
- Detroit Tigers (2002–2007); Atlanta Braves (2008–2010); Florida / Miami Marlins (2011–2012); Detroit Tigers (2012–2013); Kansas City Royals (2014–2016)

Career highlights and awards
- All-Star (2010)

Omar Rafael Infante (born December 26, 1981) is a Venezuelan former professional baseball second baseman. He played in Major League Baseball (MLB) for the Detroit Tigers, Atlanta Braves, Miami Marlins, and Kansas City Royals. He was an All-Star in 2010, and won a World Series in 2015. While primarily a second baseman, he has experience at every position except for pitcher, catcher, and first base.

== Career ==
=== Detroit Tigers ===
Infante made his major league debut with the Detroit Tigers on September 7, 2002, and entered the 2003 season as the starting shortstop for the Detroit Tigers. Ramón Santiago, considered a better glove-man started the season at second base. Considered two of the Tigers better prospects, both proved overmatched; Infante hit .222 with no home runs and eight RBIs in over 200 at-bats.

In 2004, Infante lost any chance to claim the starting shortstop role when the Tigers acquired Carlos Guillén, who went on to be an All-Star that year (Santiago had been included in the trade for Guillén). With Guillén at shortstop and free agent acquisition Fernando Viña at second base, Infante was likely to spend much of the season in the minors. Then he received an opportunity in mid-May to play every day at second base when Viña was sidelined for the year by a hamstring injury. He responded by playing solid defense and hitting .264 with 16 home runs and 55 RBIs in 142 games.

Infante's rebound in 2004 fueled speculation that he may one day become a star at second base. In 2005, however, he regressed, and the Tigers sought his replacement. In June of that year, the Tigers traded for Plácido Polanco, who had been filling a utility role with the Philadelphia Phillies. Polanco became the starting second baseman, and Infante moved to the bench.

Following his move to the bench, Infante played seven different positions during the 2007 season.

=== Chicago Cubs ===
On November 12, 2007, Infante was traded to the Chicago Cubs for Jacque Jones. On December 4, 2007, Infante was traded again, this time along with Will Ohman to the Atlanta Braves for José Ascanio. A Cub for less than a month during the off-season, Infante never appeared in a game.

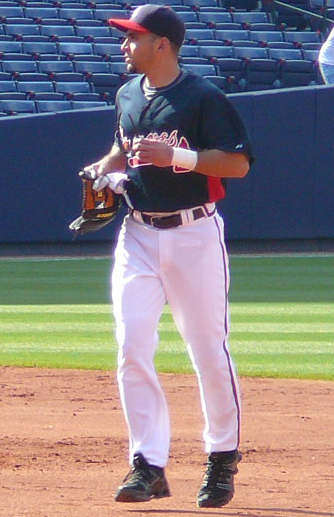
Infante with the Atlanta Braves in 2008

=== Atlanta Braves ===
On January 12, 2009, Infante signed a two-year contract worth $4.3 million with the Atlanta Braves.

National League manager Charlie Manuel selected Infante to the 2010 National League All-Star Team, earning Infante his first selection after proving to be one of the most valuable utility men in the National League. Infante was one of six Braves on the All-Star team.

=== Florida/Miami Marlins ===
After the 2010 season, Infante and reliever Michael Dunn were traded to the Florida Marlins for second baseman Dan Uggla. On September 27, 2011, it was announced that Infante and the Marlins had agreed on a two-year extension, worth around $8 million.

In 2011, Infante lead the Majors in fielding assists.

On June 21, 2012, Infante played in his 1000th game against the Boston Red Sox at Fenway Park.

=== Detroit Tigers (second stint) ===
Infante and Aníbal Sánchez were traded by the Marlins to the Detroit Tigers, on July 23, 2012, in exchange for Jacob Turner, Rob Brantly, and Brian Flynn.

In Game 4 of the 2012 World Series on October 28, 2012, Infante suffered a broken left hand after being hit by a pitch.

Infante had a stellar 2013 season for the Tigers, despite spending over a month on the disabled list with a lower leg injury. He hit .318, his highest batting average since his career best .321 in 2010 with the Braves along with 10 home runs and 51 RBI. He also posted the highest slugging percentage of his career (.450).

=== Kansas City Royals ===
On December 16, 2013, Infante signed a four-year, $30.25 million contract with the Kansas City Royals, with a club option for 2018.

Infante recorded a career-high 66 RBIs in 2014. After struggling in the ALDS, in Game 2 of the 2014 World Series, Infante hit a 2-run home run against the San Francisco Giants in the bottom of the 6th inning in a 5-run inning to lift the Royals past the Giants in a 7–2 victory.

During the 2015 season, Infante took part in many defensive gems while teaming with Gold Glove shortstop Alcides Escobar, and also experienced an offensive highlight by knocking in a career-high seven runs against the Cleveland Indians on September 18, 2015. But Infante lost his starting job for the latter part of the 2015 season after the Royals acquired Ben Zobrist before the trade deadline. Infante won his first championship, but played only sparingly as the Royals won the ALDS, the ALCS, and the World Series in 2015.

After hitting just .238 in parts of three injury-riddled seasons with the Royals, Infante was designated for assignment on June 15, 2016. He was second in the all-star ballot at the time of his release. He cleared waivers and became a free agent on June 23.

=== Atlanta Braves (second stint) ===
On June 30, 2016, Infante agreed to a minor league deal with the Atlanta Braves organization. He was released by the Braves on August 16.

=== Detroit Tigers (third stint) ===
On December 9, 2016, the Detroit Tigers signed Infante to a minor league contract, and he was invited to spring training. Infante spent the 2017 season with the Triple–A Toledo Mud Hens, playing in 123 games and hitting .282/.315/.364 with 3 home runs and 37 RBI. He elected free agency following the season on November 6.

== See also ==
- List of Major League Baseball players from Venezuela
