= Kyle Skipworth =

American baseball player (born 1990)

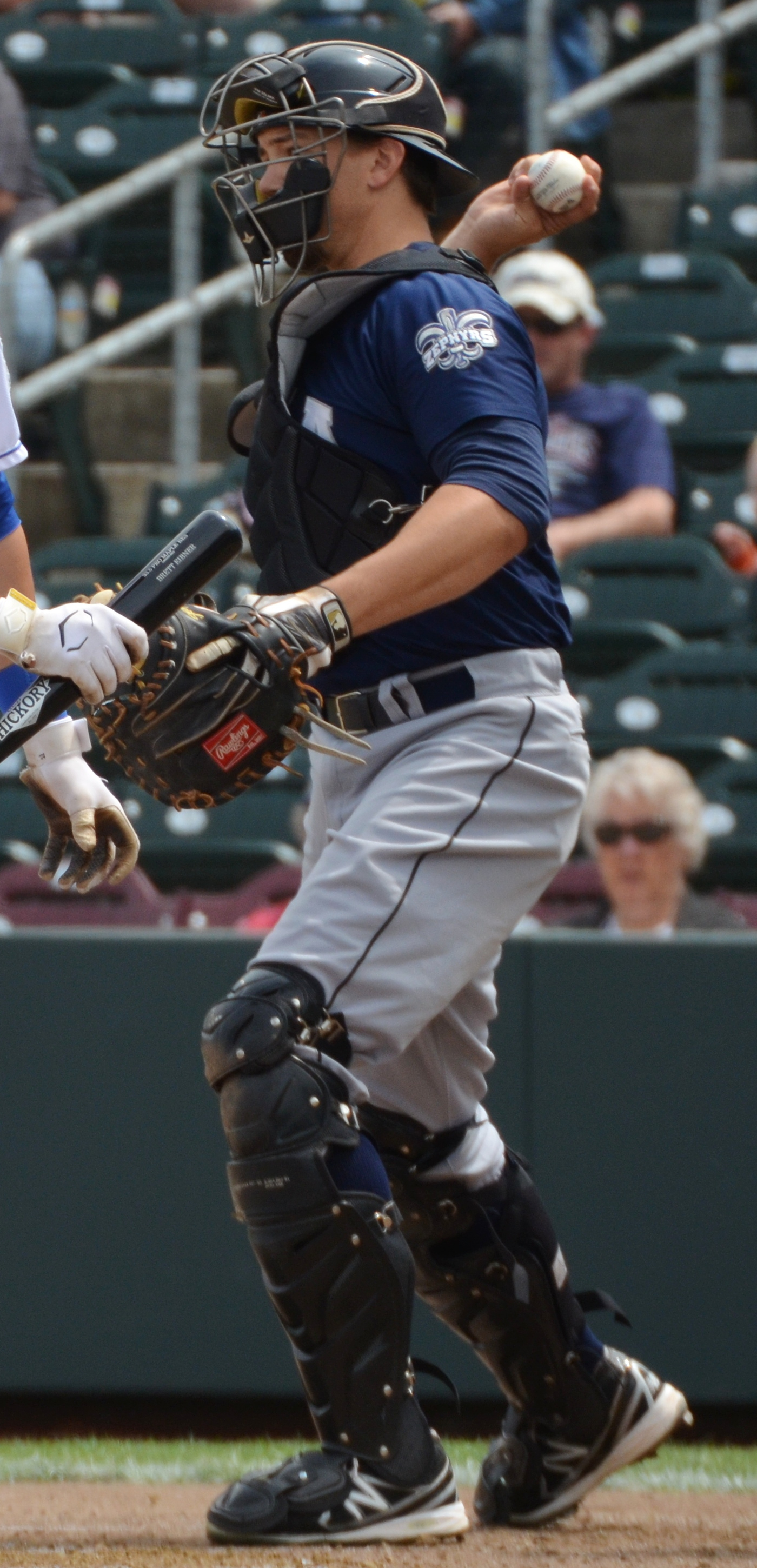
- Skipworth with the New Orleans Zephyrs in 2014
- Catcher
- Born: March 1, 1990 (age 36); Riverside, California, U.S.
- Batted: Left Threw: Right

MLB debut
- April 10, 2013, for the Miami Marlins

Last appearance
- May 11, 2013, for the Miami Marlins

MLB statistics
- Batting average: .000
- Hits: 0
- Runs batted in: 0
- Stats at Baseball Reference

Teams
- Miami Marlins (2013)

Kyle Trent Skipworth (born March 1, 1990) is an American former professional baseball catcher. He played in Major League Baseball (MLB) for the Miami Marlins in 2013.

== Career ==
Skipworth attended Patriot High School. He won the Gatorade High School Baseball Player of the Year Award in 2008.

=== Florida/Miami Marlins ===
Skipworth was drafted in the first round (sixth overall) of the 2008 amateur draft by the Florida Marlins. and began his professional career that year. He hit .208 in 43 games with the Gulf Coast League Marlins. In 2009, Skipworth hit .208 in 70 games with the Greensboro Grasshoppers of the Single–A South Atlantic League. He split 2010 between the Grasshoppers (107 games) and Jacksonville Suns of the Double–A Southern League (two games), hitting .245 with 17 home runs and 59 RBI. Playing for the Suns in 2012, Skipworth batted .217 with 21 home runs and 63 RBI.

In spring training in 2013, Skipworth competed with Miguel Olivo for a spot on the 25-man roster as a backup catcher to Rob Brantly, the starter, following an injury to Jeff Mathis. Olivo won the role, and Skipworth was optioned to the New Orleans Zephyrs of the Triple–A Pacific Coast League before the start of the season. On April 5, the Marlins promoted Skipworth to the major leagues when they placed Casey Kotchman on the disabled list. In 4 games for Miami, he went 0–for–3 with a walk. Skipworth was designated for assignment by the Marlins on December 18, following the signing of Casey McGehee. He cleared waivers and was sent outright to Triple–A New Orleans on December 20.

Skipworth played the 2014 season with New Orleans, hitting .216/.292/.407 with 10 home runs and 30 RBI over 70 appearances. He became a free agent at the end of the season.

=== Cincinnati Reds ===
On November 18, 2014, Skipworth signed a minor league contract with the Cincinnati Reds that included an invitation to spring training. On April 13, 2015, the Reds selected Skipworth's contract, adding him to their active roster. He never made appearance for the Reds, and was optioned to the Triple–A Louisville Bats on April 17. In 78 games split between Louisville and the Double–A Pensacola Blue Wahoos, Skipworth slashed .199/.285/.403 with 11 home runs and 29 RBI.

Skipworth underwent ankle surgery in December 2015 and began the 2016 campaign on the disabled list as a result. On June 9, 2016, the Reds activated Skipworth from the 60–day disabled list, but subsequently removed him from the 40–man roster and sent him outright to Pensacola. He elected free agency on October 3.
