= Brian Flynn (baseball) =

American baseball player (born 1990)

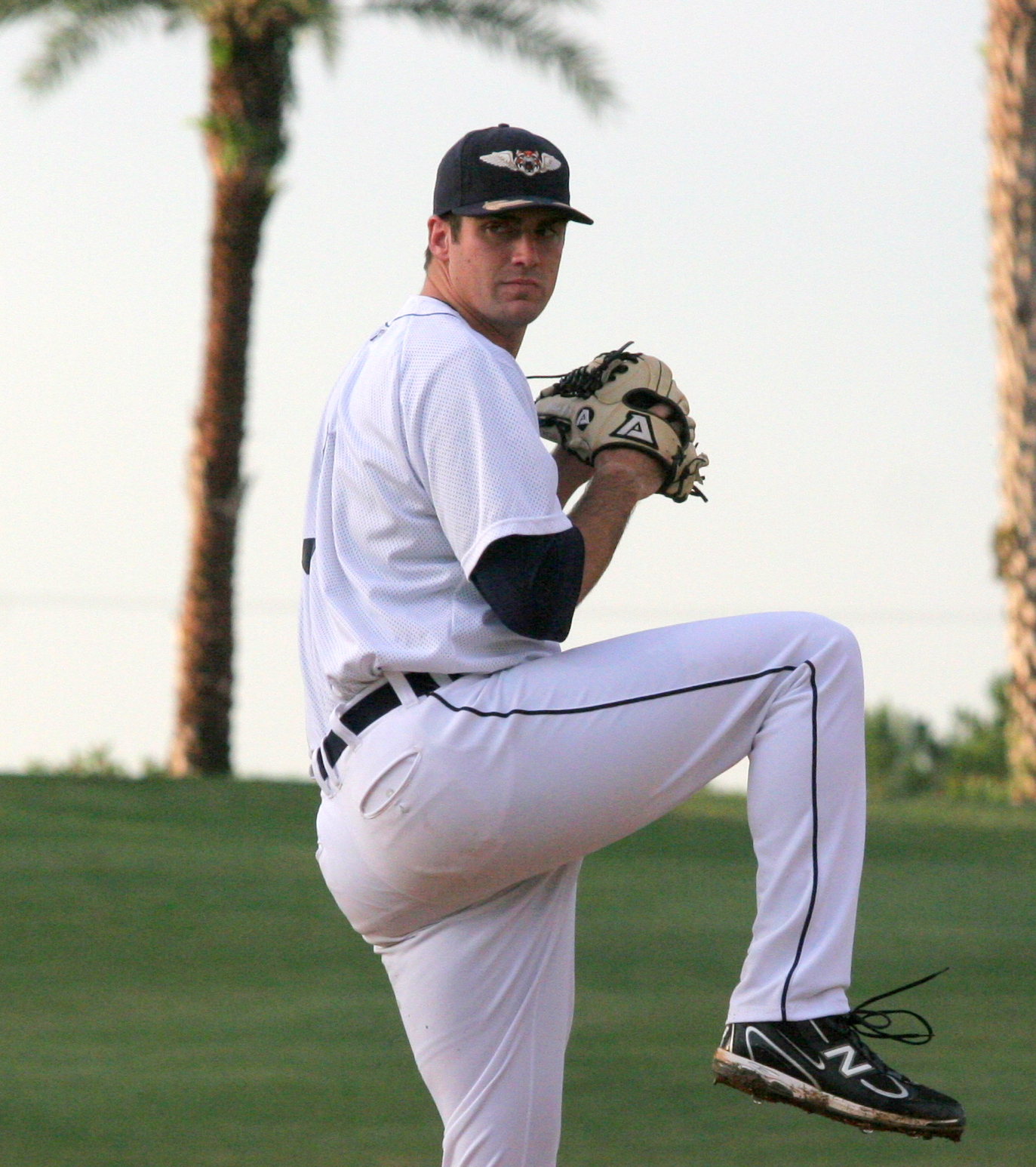
- Flynn pitching for the Lakeland Flying Tigers in 2012
- Pitcher
- Born: April 19, 1990 (age 36); Tulsa, Oklahoma, U.S.
- Batted: Left Threw: Left

MLB debut
- September 4, 2013, for the Miami Marlins

Last MLB appearance
- July 26, 2019, for the Kansas City Royals

MLB statistics
- Win–loss record: 6–12
- Earned run average: 4.41
- Strikeouts: 134
- Stats at Baseball Reference

Teams
- Miami Marlins (2013–2014); Kansas City Royals (2016–2019)

Brian Anthony Flynn (born April 19, 1990) is an American former professional baseball pitcher. He played in Major League Baseball (MLB) for the Miami Marlins and Kansas City Royals from 2013 to 2019.

== Amateur career ==
Flynn attended Owasso High School in Owasso, Oklahoma, where he played as a pitcher for the school's baseball team. In 2008, his senior year, he went 9–1 with a 0.79 ERA and was named The Oklahoman's all-state player of the year. After graduating, Flynn enrolled at Wichita State University, where he played college baseball for the Wichita State Shockers. In 2011, as a redshirt sophomore, he went 6–4 with a 4.63 ERA in 67.2 innings.

== Professional career ==
=== Detroit Tigers ===
The Detroit Tigers selected Flynn in the seventh round of the 2011 MLB draft. He signed with the Tigers, beginning his professional career.

=== Miami Marlins ===
On July 23, 2012, Flynn was traded to the Miami Marlins with Jacob Turner and Rob Brantly in exchange for Omar Infante and Aníbal Sánchez.

In 2013, he played between the Jacksonville Suns of the Double-A Southern League and the New Orleans Zephyrs of the Triple-A Pacific Coast League (PCL). On September 3, he was promoted to the majors, and made his MLB debut the following day. In his debut, he lasted four-plus innings, giving up six hits and three runs. Flynn made three additional starts in 2013 for the Marlins, compiling an 0–2 record along with an 8.50 ERA. After the season, Flynn was named a PCL All-Star for his efforts in the minors.

=== Kansas City Royals ===
On November 28, 2014, the Marlins traded Flynn and Reid Redman to the Kansas City Royals in exchange for Aaron Crow.

In 2015, Flynn competed for a spot on the Royals 25-man roster out of spring training. Flynn was assigned to the Omaha Storm Chasers of the PCL and on April 9 suffered a torn lat muscle in his first and only 2015 appearance.

In 2016, he began the season with Omaha. He went 2–1 in six appearances while posting a 3.94 ERA and striking out 14 over 16 innings. On May 6, the Royals recalled Flynn. On May 6, Flynn made his first MLB appearance since August 7, 2014. Flynn surrendered two runs on three hits, struck out two and walked two over four innings in a relief appearance against the Cleveland Indians. In 2016 with Kansas City, he was 1–2 with a 2.60 ERA in 55 1/3 innings.

In 2017, Prior to the start of spring training, Flynn suffered a broken rib and three fractured vertebrae when he fell through the roof of his barn, and was ruled out for at least eight weeks. He made just one appearance in the Majors that season.

In 2018, Flynn pitched in 48 games, posting an ERA of 4.04 with a record of 3–5 with one save in 75 2/3 innings.

In 2019 with Kansas City, Flynn appeared in 11 games, posting a 2–2 record and a 5.22 ERA. On July 25, 2019, he was designated for assignment. He elected free agency on October 1. On October 10, he was selected for the United States national baseball team in the 2019 WBSC Premier 12 This did not lead to placement for the Olympic team.

=== Texas Rangers ===
On December 16, 2019, Flynn signed with the Texas Rangers on a minor league contract. He did not play in a game in 2020 due to the cancellation of the minor league season because of the COVID-19 pandemic. On July 14, 2020, Flynn opted out of his minor league contract and became a free agent.

== International career ==
Flynn was selected to represent Germany at the 2023 World Baseball Classic qualification.

== Post-playing career ==
In December 2024, Flynn became the owner and president of the Joplin Outlaws, a collegiate team in the Mid America League.
