= Steve Ames =

American baseball player (born 1988)

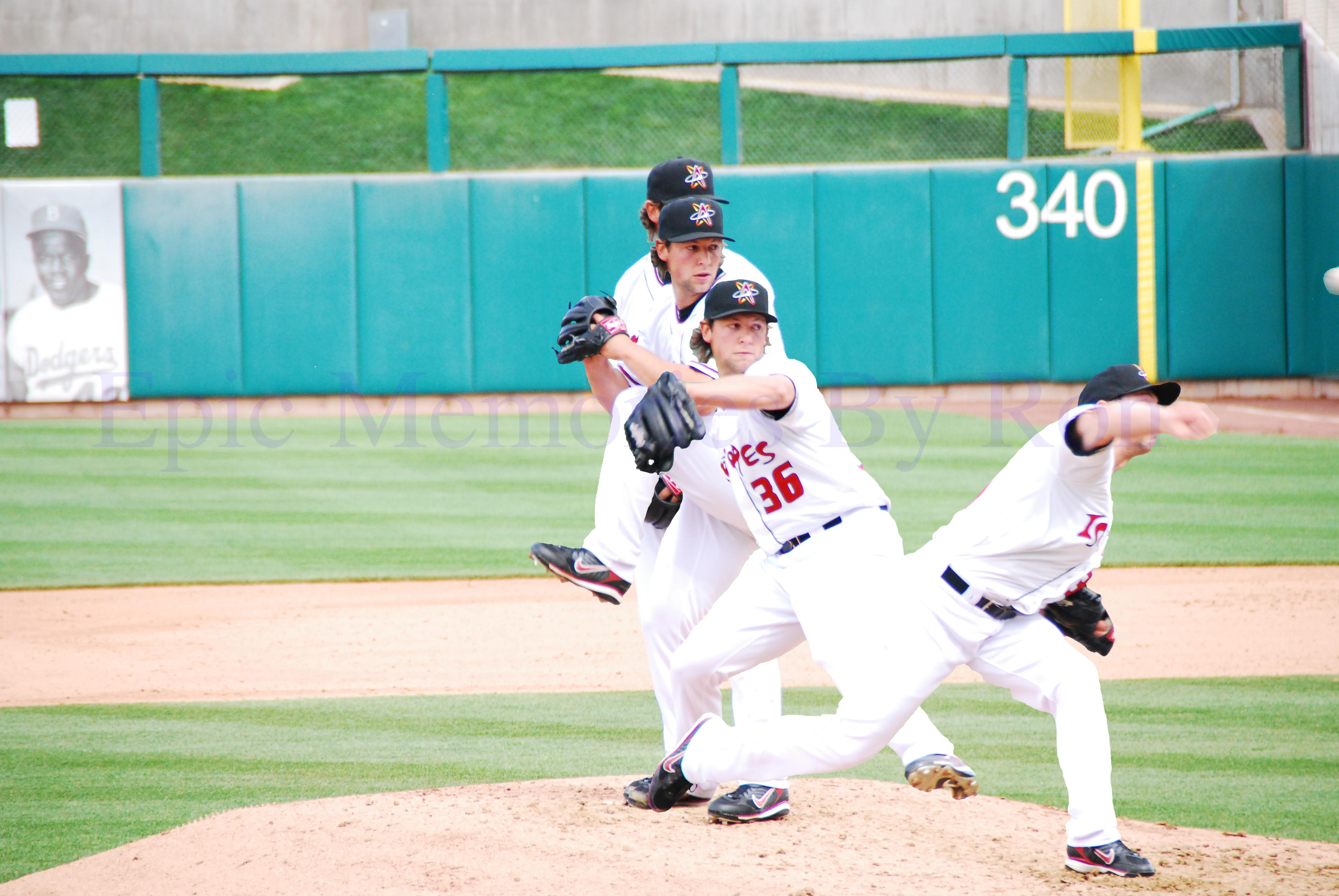
- Ames with the Albuquerque Isotopes
- Pitcher
- Born: March 15, 1988 (age 37); Vancouver, Washington, U.S.
- Batted: Right Threw: Right

MLB debut
- July 30, 2013, for the Miami Marlins

Last MLB appearance
- August 11, 2013, for the Miami Marlins

MLB statistics
- Win–loss record: 0–1
- Earned run average: 4.50
- Strikeouts: 4
- Stats at Baseball Reference

Teams
- Miami Marlins (2013)

Steven Charles Ames (born March 15, 1988) is an American former professional baseball relief pitcher. He played in Major League Baseball (MLB) for the Miami Marlins.

== Career ==
=== Los Angeles Dodgers ===
Ames was drafted by the Los Angeles Dodgers in the 17th round of the 2009 MLB draft out of Gonzaga University. He began his career with the rookie-level Ogden Raptors in 2009, with a 2.10 ERA and 47 strikeouts in 17 appearances. In 2010 with the Single-A Great Lakes Loons of the Midwest League and the rookie-level Arizona League Dodgers, Ames accumulated a 2.30 ERA with 48 strikeouts and 16 saves across 23 games. In 2011, he split the year between the High-A Rancho Cucamonga Quakes of the California League (1.17 ERA, 28 strikeouts, and 9 saves in 15 games) and the Double-A Chattanooga Lookouts of the Southern League (2.48 ERA, 41 strikeouts, and 5 saves in 28 games).

Ames spent the 2012 season with the Lookouts, where he appeared in 54 games and had a 1.56 ERA, 72 strikeouts, and 18 saves. He was also selected to the Southern League Mid-Season All-Star team. On November 20, 2012, the Dodgers added Ames to their 40-man roster to protect him from the Rule 5 draft. He was promoted to the Triple-A Albuquerque Isotopes to start the 2013 season.

=== Miami Marlins ===
On July 6, 2013, Ames was traded to the Miami Marlins (along with Josh Wall and Ángel Sánchez) in exchange for Ricky Nolasco. He began with the Triple-A New Orleans Zephyrs and was promoted to the major leagues for the first time on July 28. He made four appearances for the Marlins that season over a two-week span, posting a 4.50 ERA and 4 strikeouts while earning one loss.

On October 4, 2013, Ames was removed from the 40-man roster and sent outright to Triple-A New Orleans. He spent the entirety of the 2014 season pitching through the Marlins' minor league system. Over 5 starts with the rookie-level Gulf Coast League Marlins and 9 appearances each with the Double-A Jacksonville Suns and Triple-A New Orleans, he went 3–3 with a 3.56 ERA, 13 strikeouts, and a 1.29 WHIP. Ames was released by the Marlins organization on April 2, 2015.

=== Bridgeport Bluefish ===
Ames signed with the Bridgeport Bluefish of the independent Atlantic League of Professional Baseball for the 2015 season. In 33 games, Ames was 1–2 with a 4.45 ERA and 28 strikeouts across 28 1/3 innings pitched.
