= Alex Sanabia =

American baseball player (born 1988)

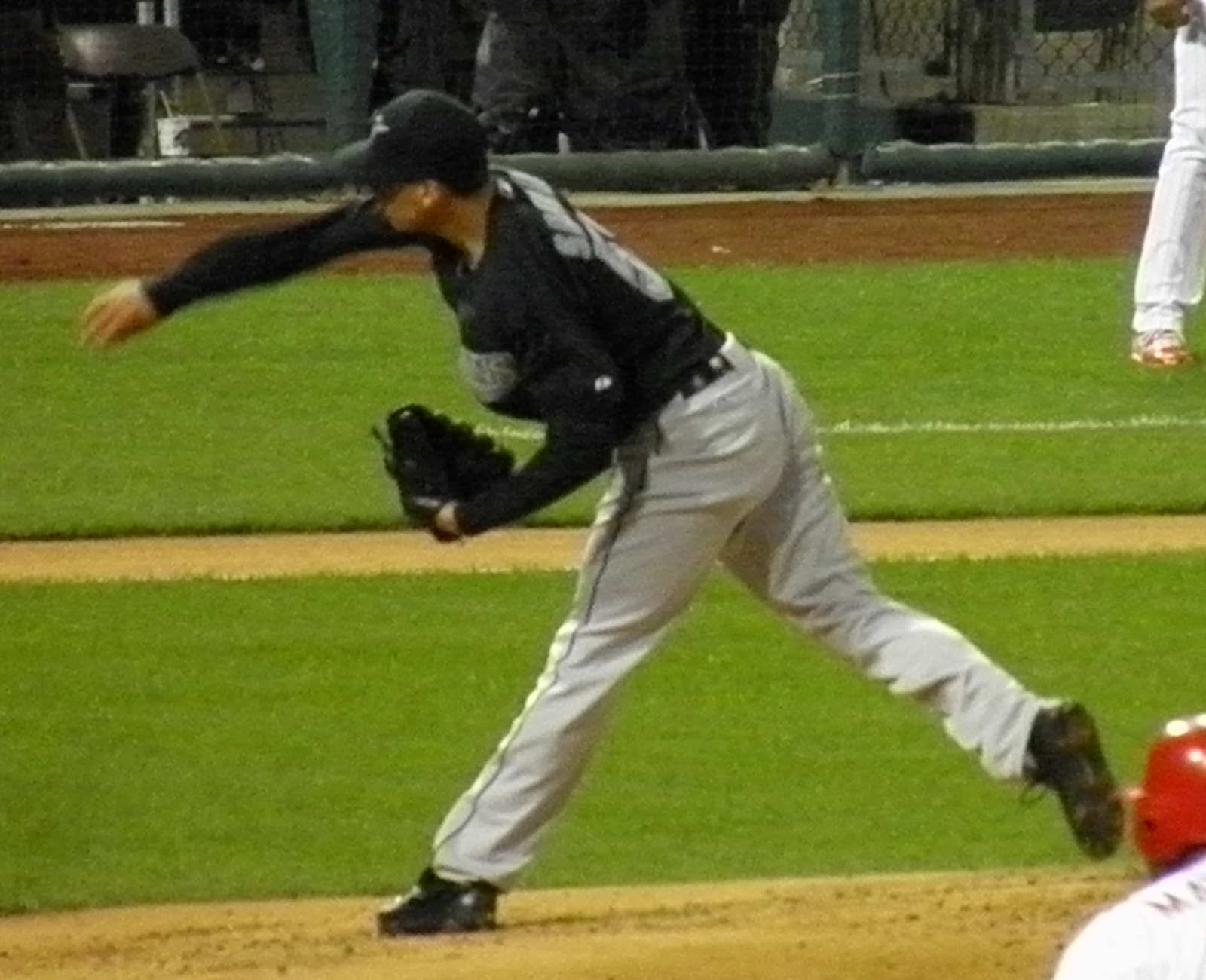
- Sanabia with the Florida Marlins

Heidenheim Heideköpfe
- Starting pitcher
- Born: September 8, 1988 (age 38); San Diego, California, U.S.
- Bats: Right Throws: Right

MLB debut
- June 24, 2010, for the Florida Marlins

MLB statistics (through 2013 season)
- Win–loss record: 8–10
- Earned run average: 4.15
- Strikeouts: 86
- Stats at Baseball Reference

Teams
- Florida/Miami Marlins (2010–2011, 2013)

Alejandro “Alex” Sanabia (born September 8, 1988) is an American right-handed professional baseball pitcher for the Heidenheim Heideköpfe of the Deutsche Baseball Liga. He has previously played in Major League Baseball (MLB) for the Florida/Miami Marlins.

== Early life ==
Sanabia was born in San Diego, California on September 8, 1998. He attended Castle Park High School in Chula Vista, California. As a senior in 2006, Sanabia earned first-team All-CIF San Diego Section Division II honors and was named the Metro Conference Pitcher of the Year.

== Career ==
=== Florida/Miami Marlins ===
Sanabia was drafted by the Florida Marlins in the 32nd round of the 2006 amateur draft and began his professional career that season, playing for the rookie–level Gulf Coast League Marlins. With them, Sanabia went 3–1 with a 3.24 ERA and 16 strikeouts in 11 relief appearances. He pitched for the Low–A Jamestown Jammers in 2007, going 2–6 with a 5.13 ERA and 69 strikeouts in 15 starts. In 2008 with the Single–A Greensboro Grasshoppers, Sanabia went 5–5 with a 4.93 ERA and 75 strikeouts across 19 starts. With the High–A Jupiter Hammerheads in 2009, Sanabia went 9-5 with a 3.45 ERA and 68 strikeouts over 19 games (18 starts). He began the 2010 season with the Double–A Jacksonville Suns, going 5–1 with a 2.03 ERA with 65 strikeouts in 14 starts prior to his call up.

Sanabia made his major league debut on June 24, 2010, pitching 3 1/3 innings in relief and posting an ERA of 5.40 against the Baltimore Orioles. He appeared in 15 games for the Marlins that year, making 12 starts, going 5–3 with a 3.73 ERA and 47 strikeouts.

In 2011 for Miami, Sanabia went posted a 3.27 ERA and 8 strikeouts in three games (two starts). In the minor leagues, he went 0–5 with a 5.75 ERA and 19 strikeouts. Sanabia began 2012 with the Triple–A New Orleans Zephyrs. He finished the 2012 season with the Zephyrs going 6-7 with a 4.06 ERA, a 1.31 WHIP, in 88 2/3 innings pitched, with 24 walks, 63 strikeouts in 17 games started.

On April 5, 2013, Sanabia made his first start since 2011, pitching 6 shutout innings against the New York Mets and picking up the win. In a May 20 start against the Philadelphia Phillies, Sanabia gained infamy for spitting on the baseball and proceeding to throw it, something he claimed he didn't know was illegal. He got the win in that start, giving up 1 run in 6 1/3 innings. Sanabia's next start, against the White Sox, was limited to 4 innings due to groin injury, and he was placed on the disabled list, and his season was ended.

=== Arizona Diamondbacks ===
Sanabia was claimed off waivers by the Arizona Diamondbacks on October 4, 2013. On April 16, 2014, Sanabia was outrighted off of the 40-man roster. In 8 games (4 starts) for the Triple–A Reno Aces, he recorded an 8.10 ERA with 11 strikeouts across 23 1/3 innings pitched. On May 5, Sanabia was released by the Diamondbacks organization.

=== Miami Marlins (second stint) ===
Sanabia returned to the Miami Marlins on a minor league contract on May 8, 2014. His 2014 minor league stats with Reno and the Triple–A New Orleans Zephyrs were a combined 7–5 record, a 4.70 ERA, a 1.49 WHIP, and 104 strikeouts in 134 innings pitched.

=== Los Angeles Angels ===
On November 24, 2014, Sanabia signed a minor league contract with the Los Angeles Angels organization. He spent the season with the Triple-A Salt Lake Bees and elected free agency on November 6, 2015.

=== Toros de Tijuana ===
On March 7, 2016, Sanabia signed with the Toros de Tijuana of the Mexican League.

=== Chicago Cubs ===
On May 9, 2016, Sanabia had his contract purchased by the Chicago Cubs and was assigned to the Triple–A Iowa Cubs. On June 13, the Cubs organization released Sanabia after he posted a 6.34 ERA in Iowa.

=== Toros de Tijuana (second stint) ===
On June 16, 2016, Sanabia signed with the Toros de Tijuana of the Mexican League. Sanabia pitched to a 3.86 ERA with a 3-1 record in 11 games for the Toros in 2017. Sanabia began the 2018 season on the disabled list.

=== Tecolotes de los Dos Laredos ===
On July 27, 2018, Sanabia was traded to the Tecolotes de los Dos Laredos to complete a deal that saw the Tecolotes acquire Sergio Mitre. In 8 games (7 starts) for Dos Laredos, he struggled to a 6.68 ERA with 23 strikeouts across 33 2/3 innings pitched.

=== Rieleros de Aguascalientes ===
On January 9, 2019, Sanabia was traded to the Rieleros de Aguascalientes of the Mexican League. In 14 starts for Aguascalientes, Sanabia struggled to a 1-8 record and 7.85 ERA with 41 strikeouts across 65 1/3 innings pitched.

=== Bravos de León ===
On July 10, 2019, Sanabia was loaned to the Bravos de León of the Mexican League for the remainder of the season. In eight starts for the Bravos, he struggled to a 1-5 record and 6.50 ERA with 29 strikeouts over 36 innings of work. Sanabia was returned to Aguascalientes after the season, but was released by the team on March 8, 2020.

=== York Revolution ===
On March 9, 2021, Sanabia signed with the York Revolution of the Atlantic League of Professional Baseball. In six starts with York, Sanabia logged a 3-0 record and 2.43 ERA with 24 strikeouts across 33 1/3 innings pitched.

=== New York Mets ===
On June 29, 2021, Sanabia’s contract was purchased by the New York Mets organization. Sanabia pitched to a 4.34 ERA in 12 appearances split between the Triple-A Syracuse Mets and Double-A Binghamton Rumble Ponies. On November 7, Sanabia elected free agency.

=== York Revolution (second stint) ===
On February 22, 2022, Sanabia re-signed with the York Revolution of the Atlantic League of Professional Baseball. In 17 starts for the Revolution, Sanabia compiled a 4-5 record and 4.86 ERA with 74 strikeouts over 87 innings of work.

=== Gastonia Honey Hunters ===
On August 16, 2022, Sanabia was traded to the Gastonia Honey Hunters of the Atlantic League of Professional Baseball. Sanabia made 5 starts for Gastonia to round out the year, posting a pristine 3–0 record and 0.93 ERA with 27 strikeouts in 29 innings pitched. He became a free agent following the season.

On April 28, 2023, Sanabia re-signed with Gastonia. He started 6 games for the Honey Hunters, registering a 4–0 record and 3.94 ERA with 25 strikeouts in 32 innings pitched. Sanabia was released by Gastonia on May 30.

=== Saraperos de Saltillo ===
On June 2, 2023, Sanabia signed with the Saraperos de Saltillo of the Mexican League. In 10 starts for the team, he went 1–2 with a 5.32 ERA and 38 strikeouts across 45 2/3 innings of work.

Sanabia made 14 starts for Saltillo in 2024, posting a 4–6 record and 3.45 ERA with 39 strikeouts across 70 1/3 innings pitched.

Sanabia made three starts for Saltillo in 2025, recording a 5.40 ERA with five strikeouts across 8 1/3 innings pitched. On May 30, 2025, Sanabia was released by the Saraperos.

=== Toros de Tijuana (third stint) ===
On June 3, 2025, Sanabia signed with the Toros de Tijuana of the Mexican League. In two appearances for Tijuana, he struggled to a 15.19 ERA with three strikeouts across 5 1/3 innings pitched. On June 25, Sanabia was released by the Toros.

=== York Revolution (third stint) ===
On July 23, 2025, Sanabia signed with the York Revolution of the Atlantic League of Professional Baseball. In three starts for the Revolution, he struggled to an 0-1 record and 6.75 ERA with nine strikeouts across 12 innings of work. Sanabia was released by York on August 4.

=== Heidenheim Heideköpfe ===
On May 7, 2026, Sanabia signed with the Heidenheim Heideköpfe of the Deutsche Baseball Liga.
