= Nick Green (baseball) =

American baseball player (born 1978)

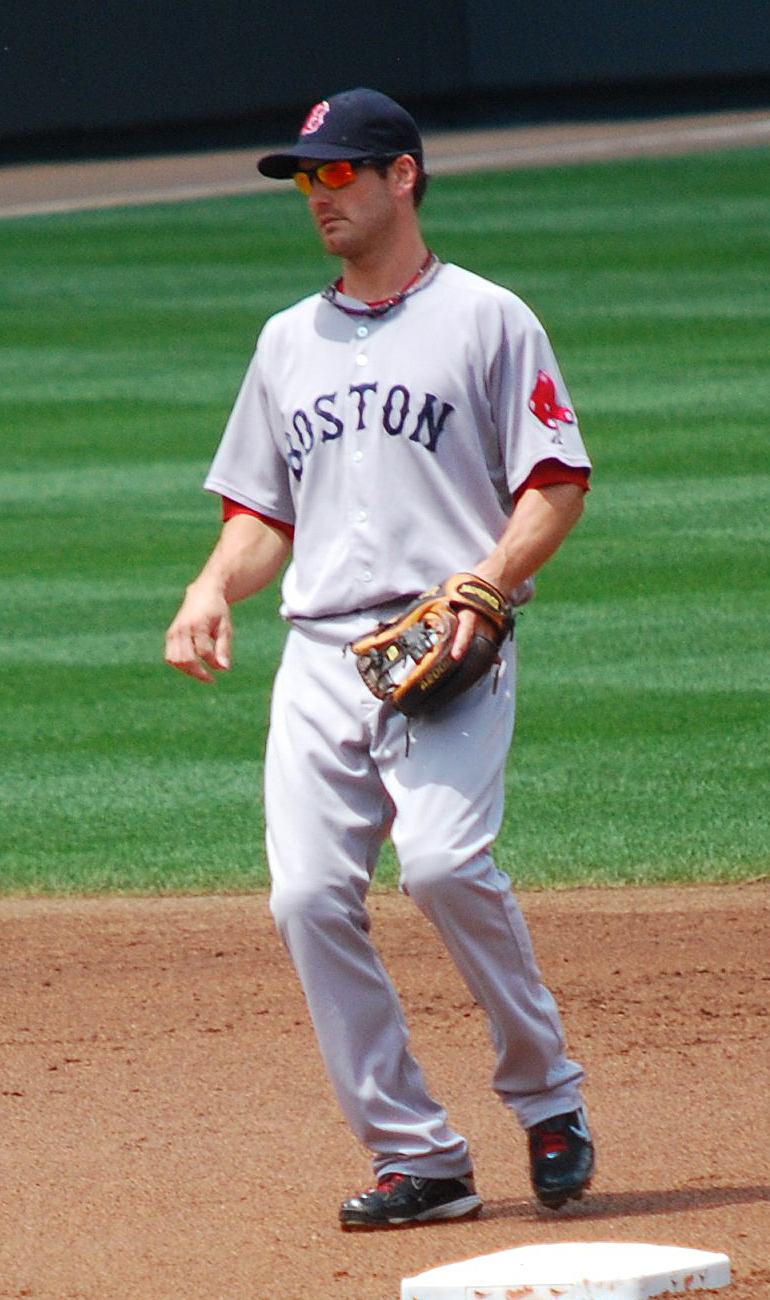
- Green with the Boston Red Sox in 2009
- Infielder
- Born: September 10, 1978 (age 47); Pensacola, Florida, U.S.
- Batted: Right Threw: Right

MLB debut
- May 15, 2004, for the Atlanta Braves

Last MLB appearance
- May 26, 2013, for the Miami Marlins

MLB statistics
- Batting average: .236
- Home runs: 17
- Runs batted in: 103
- Stats at Baseball Reference

Teams
- Atlanta Braves (2004); Tampa Bay Devil Rays (2005–2006); New York Yankees (2006); Seattle Mariners (2007); Boston Red Sox (2009); Los Angeles Dodgers (2010); Toronto Blue Jays (2010); Miami Marlins (2012–2013)

Nicholas Anthony Green (born September 10, 1978) is an American former professional baseball infielder. He played eight seasons in Major League Baseball (MLB) between 2004 and 2013 for the Atlanta Braves, Tampa Bay Devil Rays, New York Yankees, Seattle Mariners, Boston Red Sox, Los Angeles Dodgers, Toronto Blue Jays, and Miami Marlins. He played in the International Baseball League of Australia before his MLB debut in 2004. Since 2015, he has worked as an analyst on the Braves Live! post-game show, which follows Atlanta Braves games on FanDuel Sports Network South and FanDuel Sports Network Southeast.

== Career ==
Green attended Duluth High School in Duluth, Georgia, and Georgia Perimeter College.

=== Atlanta Braves ===
The Atlanta Braves selected Green in the 32nd round of the 1998 Major League Baseball draft. After spending four and a half seasons in the minors, he made his Major League debut on May 15, 2004 against the Milwaukee Brewers. His first hit came in his third at-bat of the game, in the top of the fifth inning against Brooks Kieschnick, which was an RBI single to center. He batted .273 with the Braves. On July 2, Green hit a walk-off home run in the bottom of the 12th inning to lead the Braves to victory over the Boston Red Sox. He played in two games for the Braves in the 2004 National League Division Series, but had no at-bats.

=== Tampa Bay Devil Rays ===
Prior to the 2005 season, the Tampa Bay Devil Rays received Green in a trade with the Braves in return for right-handed pitcher Jorge Sosa. He batted .239 in 111 games for the Devil Rays in 2005, and then after appearing in only 17 games with them in 2006, he was designated for assignment on May 17.

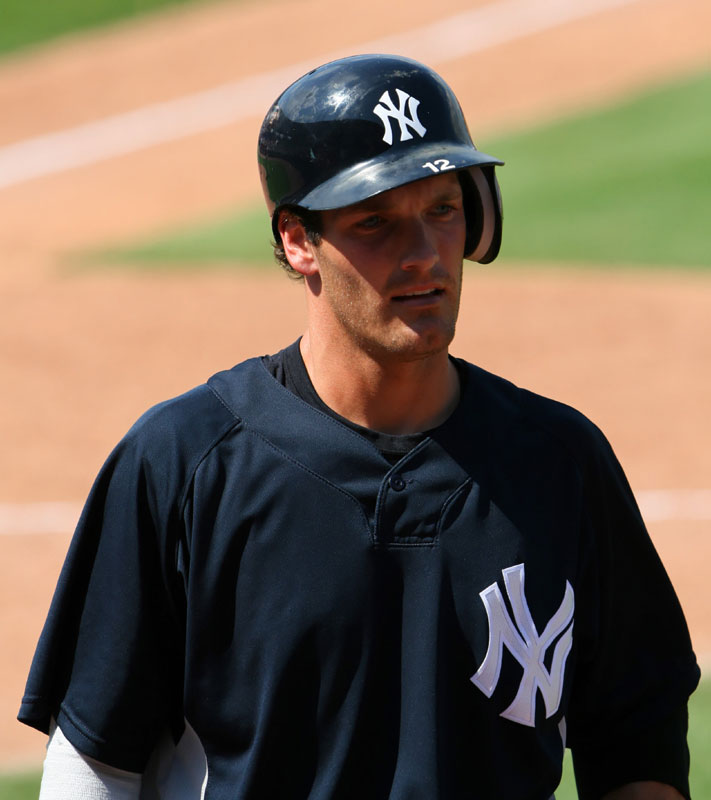
Green with the New York Yankees.

=== New York Yankees ===
On May 24, 2006, the New York Yankees acquired him for cash considerations. They assigned him to their Triple-A squad, the Columbus Clippers. On July 2, Green made his first start for the Yankees, at second base. He contributed at the plate and in the field, hitting his first Yankee home run and throwing out a runner at the plate on a strong relay throw. He elected to become a free agent on October 17.

=== Seattle Mariners ===
After starting the season with the Pittsburgh Pirates organization in 2007, Green was traded to the Seattle Mariners on June 20, 2007, and assigned to their Triple-A affiliate, the Tacoma Rainiers. On September 4, Green was called up to the Major League club. He appeared in six games for the Mariners and had seven at-bats, without recording a hit.

=== Boston Red Sox ===
After spending the 2008 season back in the Yankees minor league system, he signed a minor league contract with an invitation to spring training with the Boston Red Sox, and won a spot on the opening day roster. After teammates Julio Lugo and Jed Lowrie were both placed on the disabled list early in the season, Green became the Red Sox's starting shortstop. After Lugo returned from the DL, he and Green were on a day-to-day playing rotation.

On June 21, 2009, Green hit a first pitch walk-off home run to lead the Boston Red Sox to a 6-5 victory over the Braves. Green's only other career walk-off home run was coincidentally against the Red Sox while he was playing for the Braves.

On August 27, 2009, Green made his Major League pitching debut against the Chicago White Sox. After starter Junichi Tazawa struggled in early innings, Red Sox manager Terry Francona told Green that he would pitch the eighth inning. Green went into the dugout cages and pitched to outfielder Rocco Baldelli, who reported that Green had a full repertoire of pitches, including a two-seam fastball, and surprisingly enough a slider. Green was confused at first as to why he was pitching the eighth, and who would be pitching the ninth. With the Red Sox not scoring enough runs to warrant a new pitcher, Francona made the decision to have Green pitch in the ninth inning as well. During his two innings of scoreless relief, Green walked 3 batters and allowed no hits and no runs on 35 pitches. He topped out at 90 mph on his fastball. He also threw one slider in the game. Green was the first Red Sox position player to go at least two innings of relief and not give up a hit since 1944. Green was also the first Red Sox position player to pitch multiple innings in a game since David McCarty did it in 2004.

=== Los Angeles Dodgers ===
On January 11, 2010, Green signed a minor league contract with the Los Angeles Dodgers. On April 4, he was the last man cut from the Major League roster out of spring training, and accepted his assignment to the Albuquerque Isotopes, the Dodgers' Triple-A franchise. He was promoted to the Dodgers on May 4, when Rafael Furcal was placed on the disabled list. On May 28, he was designated for assignment, and returned to the Isotopes. He was released by the Dodgers on June 16.

=== Toronto Blue Jays ===
On June 18, 2010, Green signed a major league contract with the Toronto Blue Jays, with Mike McCoy being sent down to make room for him. On July 17, he was designated for assignment to make room for pitcher Shaun Marcum, and refused minor league assignment, electing to be a free agent.

=== San Diego Padres ===
On July 23, 2010, Green signed a minor league contract with the San Diego Padres. He played in 40 games for the Triple-A Portland Beavers, batting .264.

=== Baltimore Orioles ===
On December 10, 2010, Green was widely reported to have signed a minor league deal with an invitation to spring training with the Baltimore Orioles. However, subsequent reports clarified that he and the team had never reached a formal agreement. On January 28, 2011, he did formally agree to a minor league contract with an invitation to spring training.

=== Texas Rangers ===
On July 19, 2011, Green, along with cash, was traded to the Texas Rangers for minor league pitcher Zachary Phillips.

=== Miami Marlins ===
On December 13, 2011, Green signed a minor league contract with the Miami Marlins, with an invitation to spring training. He spent the bulk of the season with the Triple-A New Orleans Zephyrs before getting called up on August 4, 2012, when Emilio Bonifacio was placed on the DL with a sprained left thumb. However, after going 3-for-21 in six games, Green sprained his left thumb as well and was placed on the disabled list on August 16. He was outrighted off the Marlins' roster on October 17, and elected free agency.

Green signed a minor league contract on January 15, 2013, with an invitation to spring training. He started the season with the Triple-A New Orleans Zephyrs. His contract was selected by the Marlins on April 18 when Adeiny Hechavarria was placed on the disabled list. He was designated for assignment on May 2, and assigned outright to the Zephyrs on May 5. On May 7, the Marlins again selected Green's contract following an injury to Donovan Solano. Green was once more designated for assignment on May 29, and his contract was assigned to the Zephyrs on May 30. He declared free agency on October 2.
