= Edgar Olmos =

American baseball player (born 1990)

- Pitcher
- Born: April 12, 1990 (age 35); Van Nuys, California, U.S.
- Batted: Left Threw: Left

Professional debut
- MLB: June 3, 2013, for the Miami Marlins
- NPB: 2018, for the Chiba Lotte Marines

Last appearance
- MLB: September 4, 2015, for the Seattle Mariners
- NPB: September 20, 2018, for the Chiba Lotte Marines

MLB statistics
- Win–loss record: 1–1
- Earned run average: 5.21
- Strikeouts: 6

NPB statistics
- Win–loss record: 0–2
- Earned run average: 7.71
- Strikeouts: 5
- Stats at Baseball Reference

Teams
- Miami Marlins (2013); Seattle Mariners (2015); Chiba Lotte Marines (2018)

Edgar Olmos (born April 12, 1990) is an American former professional baseball pitcher. He played in Major League Baseball (MLB) for the Miami Marlins and Seattle Mariners, and in Nippon Professional Baseball (NPB) for the Chiba Lotte Marines.

== Career ==
=== Florida/Miami Marlins ===
Olmos attended Birmingham High School in Van Nuys, California, and was selected by the Marlins in the third round (83rd overall) of the 2008 MLB draft. He made his professional debut for the rookie-level Gulf Coast League Marlins. Olmos only played in 3 games in 2009 and spent the 2010 season with the Single-A Greensboro Grasshoppers, pitching to a 3–9 record and 4.37 ERA in 25 games. He spent the next year with the High-A Jupiter Hammerheads, but struggled to a 4–17 record and 6.63 ERA. In 2012, Olmos split the season between the Double-A Jacksonville Suns and Jupiter, pitching to a 1–6 record and 3.74 ERA. He began the 2013 season in Jacksonville.

The Marlins promoted Olmos to the major leagues for the first time on June 3, 2013. Olmos made five appearances for Miami in 2013, but allowed nine runs in fove innings of work. He did not appear in a major league game in 2014, instead playing in the minors with the Triple-A New Orleans Zephyrs and Jacksonville.

=== Seattle Mariners ===
The Seattle Mariners claimed Olmos off waivers on November 20, 2014. On February 13, 2015, he was designated for assignment by the Mariners when they signed free agent Rickie Weeks, He was subsequently claimed by the Texas Rangers off waivers on February 24. Olmos reported to training camp with a shoulder injury, which caused him to be shut down. On March 4, the Rangers reversed their waiver claim, sending him back to the Mariners. He made six appearances for the Mariners in 2015, pitching to a 4.50 earned run average (ERA), and in 20 games for the Tacoma Rainiers of the Triple-A Pacific Coast League, pitching to a 3.55 ERA.

The Mariners designated Olmos for assignment on December 2.

=== Baltimore Orioles ===
The Chicago Cubs claimed Olmos off waivers on December 4, 2015. The Baltimore Orioles acquired Olmos off waivers on December 10. Olmos was reclaimed by the Cubs on December 23. However, he was again designated for assignment on February 12, 2016.

On March 24, 2016, Olmos was traded to the Baltimore Orioles in exchange for a player to be named later. He spent the season in Triple-A with the Norfolk Tides, making 42 appearances out of the bullpen and registering a 2.88 ERA with 76 strikeouts in 68.2 innings pitched. Olmos elected free agency following the season on November 7.

=== Boston Red Sox ===
On November 16, 2016, Olmos signed a minor league contract with the Boston Red Sox. He spent the season with the Triple-A Pawtucket Red Sox, making 29 appearances and logging a 9–3 record and 2.68 ERA with 77 strikeouts and 4 saves in 87 1/3 innings of work. Olmos elected free agency following the season on November 6, 2017.

=== Chiba Lotte Marines ===
On December 13, 2017, Olmos signed with the Chiba Lotte Marines of Nippon Professional Baseball (NPB) on December 13. He became a free agent following the 2018 season after recording a 7.71 ERA in two appearances.

=== Toros de Tijuana ===
On January 16, 2020, Olmos signed with the Toros de Tijuana of the Mexican League. Olmos did not play in a game in 2020 due to the cancellation of the Mexican League season because of the COVID-19 pandemic. He later became a free agent.
