= Zach Phillips =

American baseball player (born 1986)

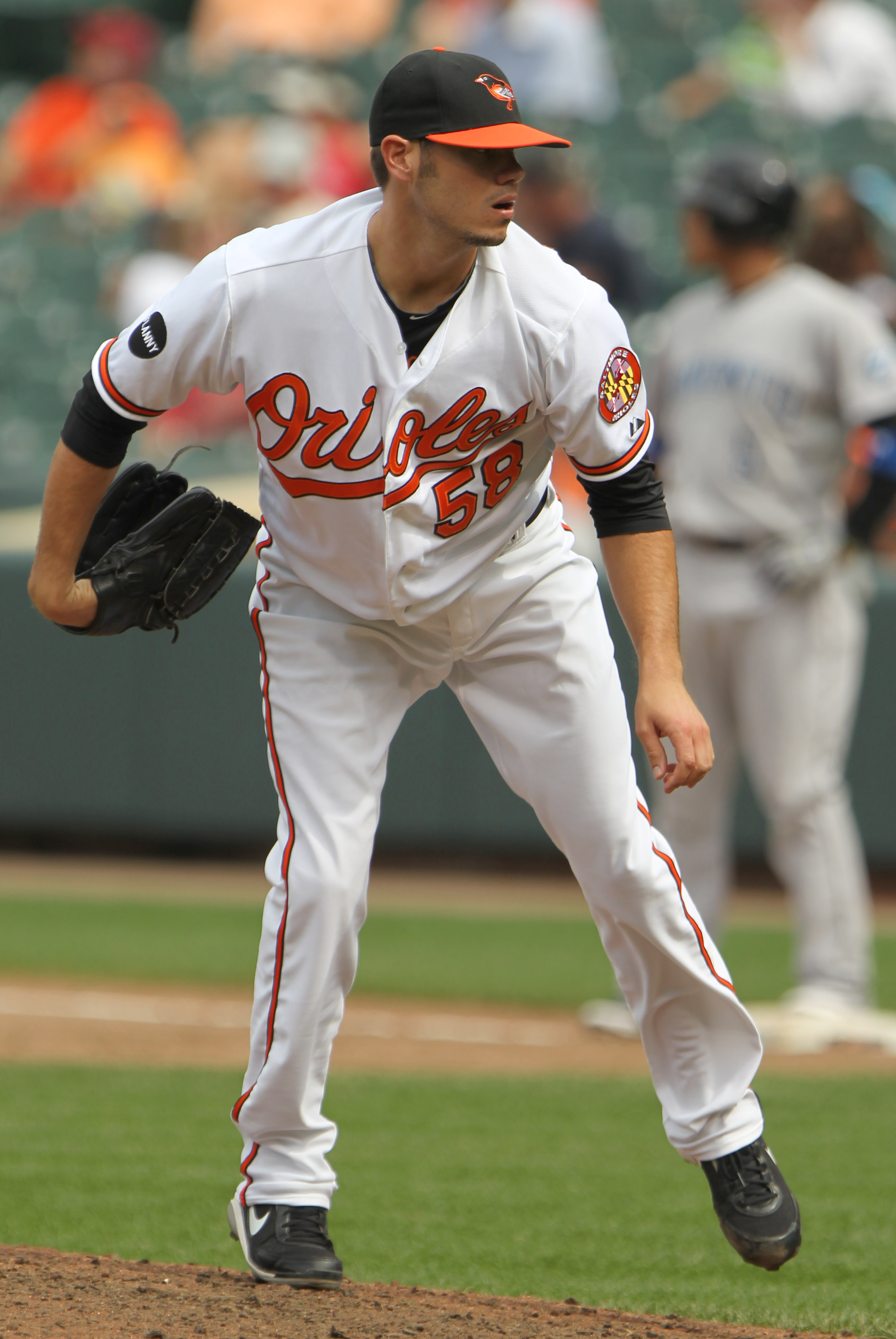
- Phillips with the Baltimore Orioles

Free agent
- Pitcher
- Born: September 21, 1986 (age 40); Sacramento, California, U.S.
- Bats: Left Throws: Left

Professional debut
- MLB: August 31, 2011, for the Baltimore Orioles
- NPB: May 10, 2014, for the Hiroshima Toyo Carp

MLB statistics (through 2016 season)
- Win–loss record: 0–1
- Earned run average: 3.22
- Strikeouts: 20

NPB statistics (through 2014 season)
- Win–loss record: 1-0
- Earned run average: 3.27
- Strikeouts: 7
- Stats at Baseball Reference

Teams
- Baltimore Orioles (2011–2012); Miami Marlins (2013); Hiroshima Toyo Carp (2014); Pittsburgh Pirates (2016)

Zachary David Phillips (born September 21, 1986) is a Mexican-American professional baseball pitcher who is a free agent. He has previously played in Major League Baseball (MLB) for the Baltimore Orioles, Miami Marlins, and Pittsburgh Pirates, and in Nippon Professional Baseball (NPB) for the Hiroshima Toyo Carp. He was drafted by the Texas Rangers in the 23rd round of the 2005 MLB draft.

== Career ==
=== Texas Rangers ===
Phillips was drafted by the Texas Rangers in the 23rd round, with the 681st overall selection, of the 2005 Major League Baseball draft, being signed by scout Tim Fortugno.

Phillips began his professional career in 2005, playing for the Arizona League Rangers (14 games) and Clinton LumberKings (two games), going a combined 1-3 with a 4.14 ERA in 16 games (11 starts). In 54 1/3 innings, he struck out 77 batters. He spent all of 2006 with the LumberKings, going 5-23 with a 5.96 ERA in 28 starts. The following year, he played for the Clinton again and went 11-7 with a 2.91 ERA in 27 starts, striking out 157 batters in 151 2/3 innings of work. In 2008, he went 8-9 with a 5.54 ERA in 28 starts for the Bakersfield Blaze.

For the 2009 season, Phillips converted to relief pitching and went a combined 2-3 with a 1.39 ERA in 36 combined games for the Blaze (16 games) and Frisco RoughRiders (20 games). He began the 2010 season with the RoughRiders but was later promoted to the Oklahoma City RedHawks.

On July 14, 2011, Phillips was designated for assignment by the Rangers, giving them 10 days to trade, release, or outright him to the minors.

=== Baltimore Orioles ===
On July 19, 2011, Phillips was traded to the Baltimore Orioles in exchange for minor league infielder Nick Green and cash. He made his Major League debut for the Orioles on August 31, against the Toronto Blue Jays. He appeared in 10 games during his rookie campaign, with a 1.13 ERA and 8 strikeouts in 8 innings pitched.

Phillips made 6 appearances for Baltimore in 2012, struggling to a 6.00 ERA with 5 strikeouts over 6 innings of work. On November 4, 2012, Phillips elected free agency after refusing his outright assignment to the Triple-A Norfolk Tides.

=== Miami Marlins ===
On November 25, 2012, Phillips signed a minor league contract with the Miami Marlins organization. After not making the team, he was assigned to the Triple-A New Orleans Zephyrs, where he spent most of the 2013 season. In 50 games with the Zephyrs, he went 4-2 with a 2.44 ERA and a save, striking out 74 in 59 innings. On September 1, 2013, the Marlins selected Phillips' contract, adding him to their active roster. Phillips appeared in 3 games with Miami, where he went 0-1 while giving up 1 run in 1 2/3 innings. He was outrighted off the roster on October 7, and elected to become a free agent.

=== Hiroshima Toyo Carp ===
On October 28, 2013, Phillips signed a one-year contract with the Hiroshima Toyo Carp of Nippon Professional Baseball, including a signing bonus of $154k. In nine relief appearances for Hiroshima in 2014, Phillips went 1-0 with a 3.27 ERA and 7 strikeouts across 11 innings pitched.

=== Chicago White Sox ===
On December 15, 2014, Phillips signed a minor league contract with the Chicago White Sox. In 46 appearances for the Triple-A Charlotte Knights, he posted a 1-1 record and 3.13 ERA with 64 strikeouts and 12 saves across 54 2/3 innings pitched. On November 4, 2015, the White Sox added Phillips to their 40-man roster. However, on March 18, 2016, Phillips was removed from the 40-man roster and sent outright to Charlotte, an assignment which he declined in favor of free agency.

=== Baltimore Orioles (second stint) ===
Phillips signed a one-year contract with the Baltimore Orioles on March 23, 2016. On April 1, he was removed from the 40–man roster and outrighted to the Triple–A Norfolk Tides. In 49 relief outings for Norfolk, Phillips compiled a 9–3 record and 4.45 ERA with 84 strikeouts across 60 2/3 innings pitched.

=== Pittsburgh Pirates ===
On August 31, 2016, Phillips was traded to the Pittsburgh Pirates in exchange for left-handed pitcher Kyle Lobstein. On September 13, the Pirates selected Phillips' contract, adding him to their active roster. In 8 appearances for Pittsburgh, he posted a 2.70 ERA with 6 strikeouts across 6 2/3 innings pitched. On November 2, Phillips was removed from the 40-man roster and sent outright to the Triple-A Indianapolis Indians, an assignment he rejected in favor of electing free agency the following day.

=== St. Louis Cardinals ===
On November 18, 2016, Phillips signed a minor league contract with the St. Louis Cardinals that included an invitation to spring training. In 19 appearances for the Triple-A Memphis Redbirds, he pitched to a 1-4 record and 5.04 ERA with 31 strikeouts across 30 1/3 innings pitched. Phillips was released by the Cardinals organization on June 15, 2017.

=== Acereros de Monclova ===
On June 24, 2017, Phillips signed with the Acereros de Monclova of the Mexican League. In 2018, he was naturalized as a Mexican and no longer occupied a foreign spot in the Mexican League. On February 26, 2019, He was selected Mexico national baseball team at 2019 exhibition games against Japan. Phillips did not play in a game in 2020 due to the cancellation of the Mexican League season because of the COVID-19 pandemic.

=== Rieleros de Aguascalientes ===
On July 13, 2022, Phillips was loaned to the Rieleros de Aguascalientes of the Mexican League for the remainder of the 2022 season. In 11 contests, he logged an 0.90 ERA with 14 strikeouts across 10 innings of work. On September 23, the Acereros officially traded Phillips to the Rieleros, making the loan permanent.

In 2023, Phillips made 29 relief appearances for Aguascalientes, registering a 4–3 record and 4.25 ERA with 18 strikeouts and 2 saves across 29 2/3 innings pitched.

=== Acereros de Monclova (second stint) ===
On August 1, 2023, Phillips was traded back to the Acereros de Monclova of the Mexican League. He made three scoreless outings for Monclova to finish the year.

Phillips made 31 appearances for Monclova in 2024, recording a 1.85 ERA with 12 strikeouts across 24 1/3 innings of relief.

=== Conspiradores de Querétaro ===
On February 24, 2025, Phillips was traded to the Conspiradores de Querétaro of the Mexican League. In 36 appearances, he recorded a 1–2 record with a 8.64 ERA and more walks (25) than strikeouts (19) across 33 1/3 innings pitched.

On January 26, 2026, Phillips was traded back to the Acereros de Monclova of the Mexican League. However, he was released prior to the season on February 12, before making an appearance for the team.

=== Piratas de Campeche ===
On April 26, 2026, Phillips signed with the Piratas de Campeche of the Mexican League. He made one appearance for Campeche, recording 1 1/3 scoreless innings of relief with one strikeout. Phillips was released by the Piratas on May 2.
