= Dan Jennings (pitcher) =

American baseball player (born 1987)

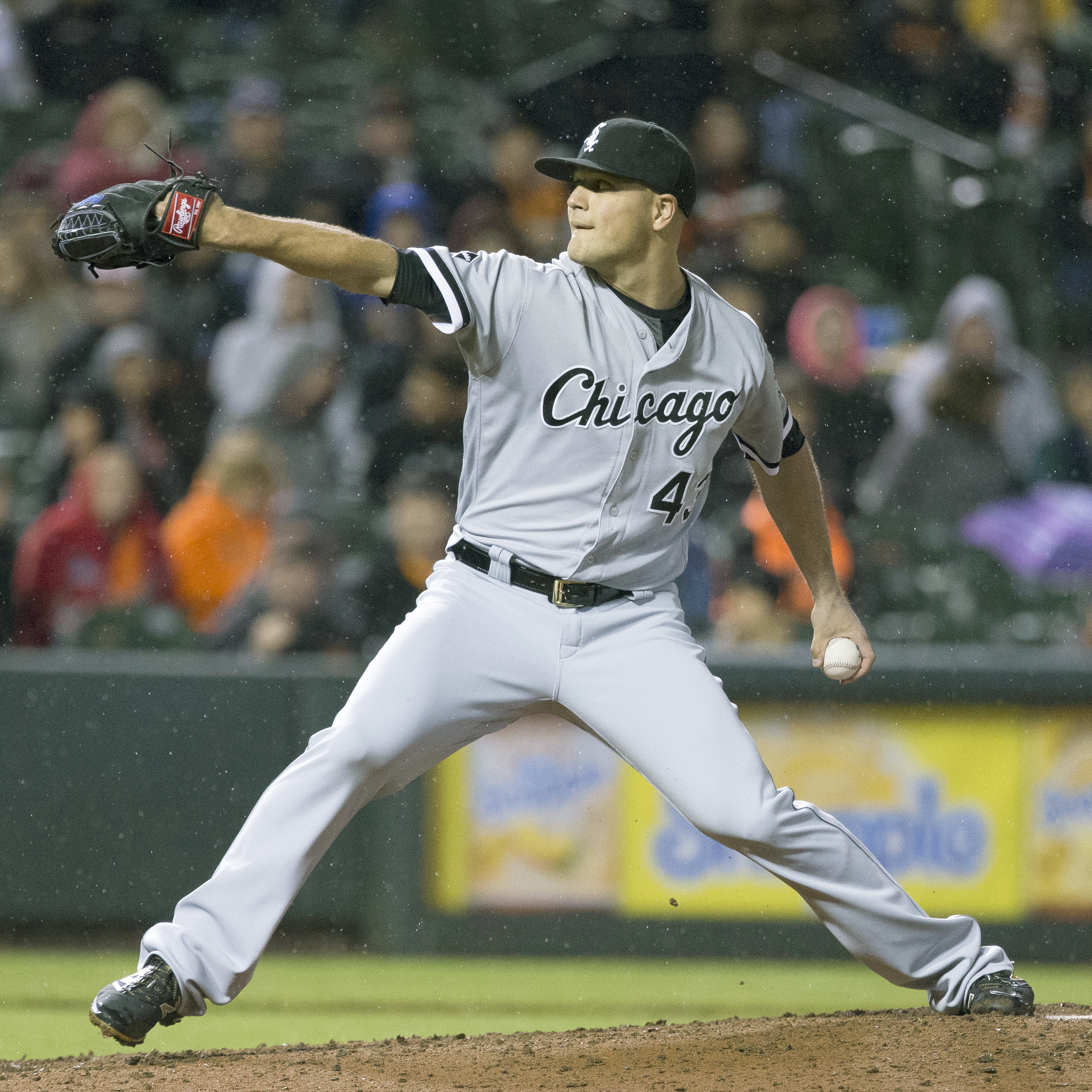
- Jennings with the Chicago White Sox in 2016
- Pitcher
- Born: April 17, 1987 (age 39); Berkeley, California, U.S.
- Batted: Left Threw: Left

MLB debut
- April 30, 2012, for the Miami Marlins

Last MLB appearance
- May 17, 2019, for the Washington Nationals

Career statistics
- Win–loss record: 17–20
- Earned run average: 3.10
- Strikeouts: 281
- Stats at Baseball Reference

Teams
- Miami Marlins (2012–2014); Chicago White Sox (2015–2017); Tampa Bay Rays (2017); Milwaukee Brewers (2018); Washington Nationals (2019)

Daniel Lee Jennings (born April 17, 1987) is an American former professional baseball pitcher. He played in Major League Baseball (MLB) for the Miami Marlins, Chicago White Sox, Tampa Bay Rays, Milwaukee Brewers, and Washington Nationals. He also played college baseball for the Nebraska Cornhuskers of the University of Nebraska–Lincoln.

== Amateur career ==
Though born in Berkeley, California, Jennings was raised in West Des Moines, Iowa. There, he attended Valley High School. Playing for the school's baseball team, he led the team to back-to-back state championships in 2004 and 2005. As a senior in 2005, Jennings pitched to a 9–0 win–loss record and 0.85 earned run average (ERA), earning All-State honors.

Jennings attended the University of Nebraska–Lincoln, where he played college baseball for the Cornhuskers. In 2006 and 2007, he played collegiate summer baseball for the Waterloo Bucks of the Northwoods League and spent the summer of 2008 with the Cotuit Kettleers of the Cape Cod Baseball League. He was drafted by the Marlins in the ninth round of the 2008 MLB draft.

== Professional career ==
=== Minor Leagues ===
Jennings made his professional debut that season for the Jamestown Jammers of the Low–A New York–Penn League.

Across three levels of minor league baseball in 2009, Jennings had a combined 1–2 record, six saves, and 2.15 ERA in 45 games overall, allowing with 26 walks and while striking out 69 batters in 62 2/3 innings pitched for the Greensboro Hornets of the Single–A South Atlantic League, the Jupiter Hammerheads of the High–A Florida State League, and the Jacksonville Suns of the Double–A Southern League. Baseball America rated Jennings as the Marlins' fourth best pitching prospect, and 13th best overall. Returning to Jacksonville in 2010, Jennings was suspended for 50 games for violating minor league baseball's policy banning the use of performance-enhancing drugs. The Marlins added Jennings to their 40-man roster after the 2011 season to protect him from the Rule 5 draft.

Jennings began the 2012 season with the New Orleans Zephyrs of the Triple–A Pacific Coast League. In nine appearances, he had a 2.08 ERA.

=== Miami Marlins ===
The Marlins promoted Jennings to MLB on April 30, 2012, and he pitched a scoreless inning in relief in his debut that day.

On August 7, 2014, Jennings was pitching in relief against the Pittsburgh Pirates when Jordy Mercer hit a line drive that struck Jennings in the head, causing a concussion. Jennings was kept overnight in a Pittsburgh hospital for observation instead of accompanying the Marlins to Cincinnati for their next series against the Cincinnati Reds after the game. Jennings later thanked Pirates fans on Twitter for their support after the crowd at PNC Park gave Jennings a standing ovation when he was carted off the field and gave the crowd a wave. He returned to the Marlins shortly thereafter, passing concussion protocol and sustaining no permanent injury.

=== Chicago White Sox ===
On December 11, 2014, Jennings was traded to the Chicago White Sox in exchange for André Rienzo.

=== Tampa Bay Rays ===
On July 27, 2017, the White Sox traded Jennings to the Tampa Bay Rays in exchange for first baseman Casey Gillaspie. He was released on March 26, 2018.

=== Milwaukee Brewers ===
On March 30, 2018, Jennings signed with the Milwaukee Brewers. He was non-tendered and became a free agent on November 30, 2018.

=== Los Angeles Angels ===
On February 15, 2019, Jennings signed a minor league deal with the Los Angeles Angels. The Angels released him on March 26.

=== Washington Nationals ===
On April 15, 2019, Jennings signed a minor league deal with the Washington Nationals. He had his contract purchased on April 30. Jennings posted a 13.50 ERA over eight games with the Nationals, before being designated for assignment on May 20. He elected free agency two days later.

=== New York Yankees ===
On July 8, 2019, Jennings signed a minor league deal with the New York Yankees. He was released by the Yankees on August 13, 2019.

=== Retirement ===
Before 2020 spring training, Jennings retired from playing professional baseball.

== Personal life ==
Jennings has been confused for the son of Dan Jennings, who was an executive for the Marlins when the younger Jennings was pitching for them. His parents, Bob and Janet Jennings, live in West Des Moines. Jennings has a brother, Tom, who currently works as a tennis professional at the Quad City Tennis Club. He is married. Jennings' parents, fiancée, and her parents all flew to Miami to watch Jennings' MLB debut.
