= Rob Brantly =

American baseball player (born 1989)

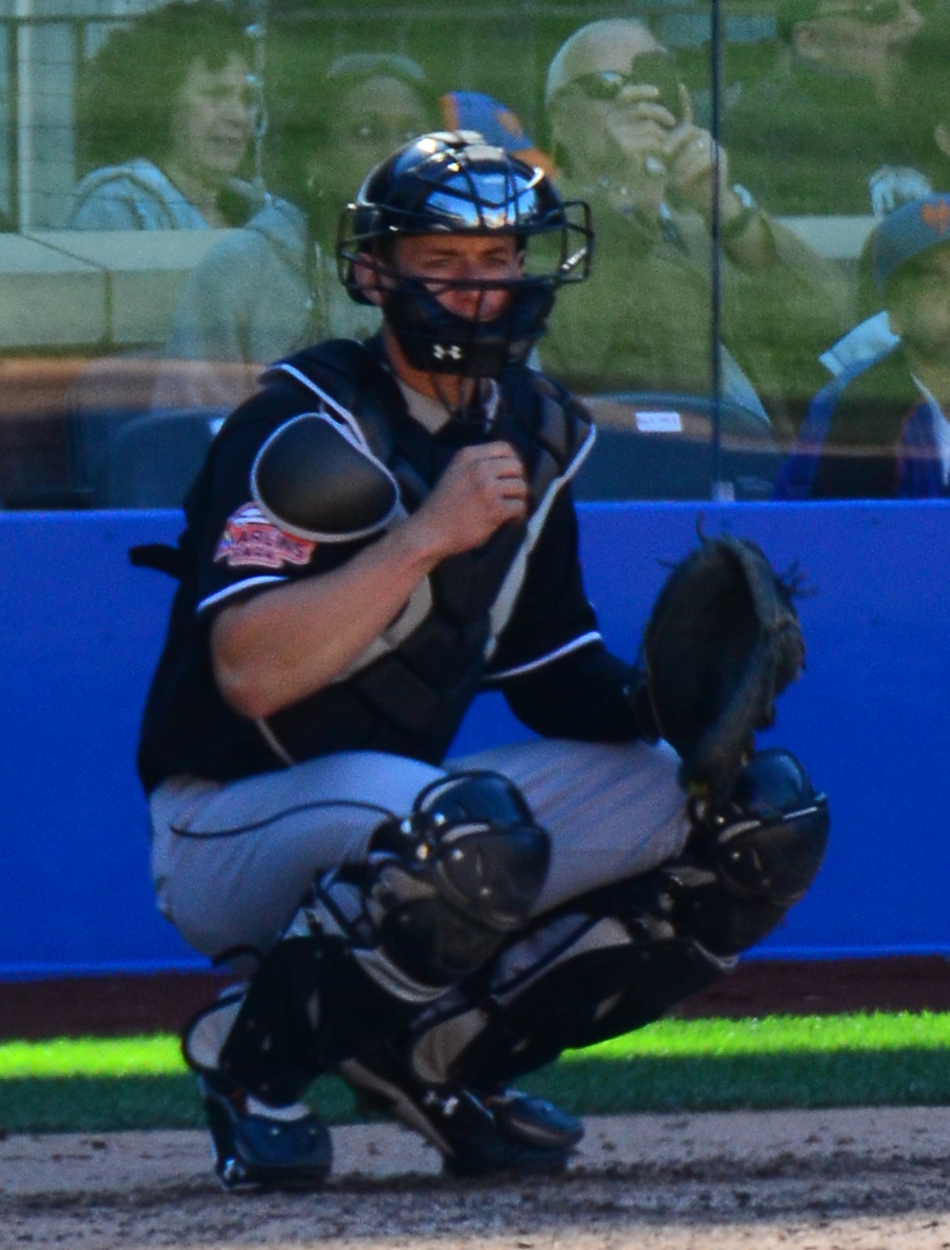
- Brantly with the Miami Marlins in 2012

Free agent
- Catcher
- Born: July 14, 1989 (age 37); San Diego, California, U.S.
- Bats: Left Throws: Right

MLB debut
- August 14, 2012, for the Miami Marlins

MLB statistics (through 2025 season)
- Batting average: .226
- Home runs: 7
- Runs batted in: 38
- Stats at Baseball Reference

Teams
- Miami Marlins (2012–2013); Chicago White Sox (2015, 2017); Philadelphia Phillies (2019); San Francisco Giants (2020); New York Yankees (2021–2022); Tampa Bay Rays (2024); Miami Marlins (2025)

Robert Jacob Brantly (born July 14, 1989) is an American professional baseball catcher who is a free agent. He has previously played in Major League Baseball (MLB) for the Miami Marlins, Chicago White Sox, Philadelphia Phillies, San Francisco Giants, New York Yankees, Tampa Bay Rays, and Miami Marlins. The Detroit Tigers drafted Brantly in the third round of the 2010 MLB draft. Before beginning his professional career, Brantly played college baseball for the UC Riverside Highlanders.

== Amateur career ==
Brantly attended Chaparral High School in Temecula, California. The Washington Nationals drafted Brantly in the 46th round of the 2008 Major League Baseball draft, but Brantly did not sign. He chose to attend the University of California, Riverside (UCR). He played college baseball for the UCR Highlanders. After his freshman season, in 2009, he played collegiate summer baseball for the La Crosse Loggers in the Northwoods League, and was named the league's top prospect. In his sophomore season, Brantly was named to the Big West Conference's first team.

== Professional career ==
=== Detroit Tigers ===
The Detroit Tigers drafted Brantly in the third round, with the 100th overall selection, of the 2010 Major League Baseball draft. He made his professional debut with the West Michigan Whitecaps of the Single-A Midwest League that summer, with a .251 batting average in 52 games played. He returned to West Michigan to start the 2011 season and was named to the Midwest League All-Star Game. Brantly was promoted to the Lakeland Flying Tigers of the High-A Florida State League in July. He finished the year hitting .274/.324/.400 in 114 games between the two teams.

Brantly played for the Erie SeaWolves of the Double-A Eastern League and the Toledo Mud Hens of the Triple-A International League in 2012. He was named to appear in the All-Star Futures Game.

=== Miami Marlins ===
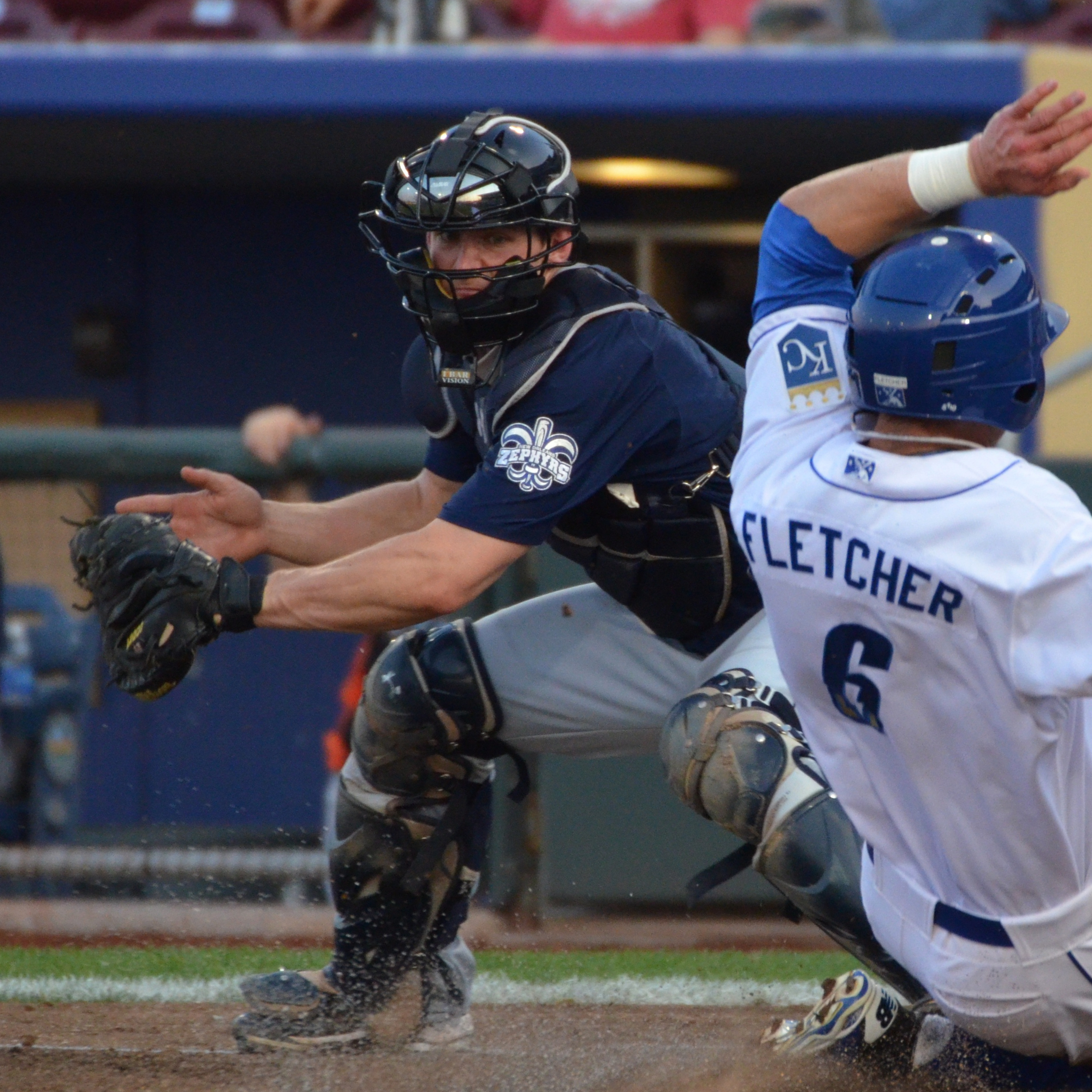
Brantly playing for the New Orleans Zephyrs in 2013

On July 23, 2012, Brantly, Jacob Turner, and Brian Flynn were traded to the Miami Marlins in exchange for Aníbal Sánchez and Omar Infante. He was assigned to the New Orleans Zephyrs of the Triple-A Pacific Coast League following his acquisition. The Marlins promoted Brantly to the major leagues for the first time on August 13. He made his MLB debut on August 14 as the starting catcher against the Philadelphia Phillies, going 0-for-3. He finished the season batting .290/.372/.460 over 100 at bats in 31 games.

Brantly was the Marlins' 2013 Opening Day catcher. He struggled offensively for Miami, hitting just .211./.263/.265 with 1 home run and 18 RBI in a career-high 223 at bats while also dealing with injuries. Brantly spent the entire 2014 season with Triple-A New Orleans, posting a .255/.291/.341 slash line with 4 home runs and 37 RBI.

=== Chicago White Sox ===
On December 8, 2014, Brantly was claimed off waivers by the Chicago White Sox. He spent the majority of the year split between the Double-A Birmingham Barons and the Triple-A Charlotte Knights and batted .121/.167/.242 with 1 home run and 6 RBIs in 14 games with the White Sox.

=== Seattle Mariners ===
On March 12, 2016, the Seattle Mariners claimed Brantly off waivers from the White Sox. On April 3, Brantly was designated for assignment after losing the backup catcher competition to Steve Clevenger. He spent the season with the Triple-A Tacoma Rainiers, slashing .244/.268/.432 with career highs in home runs (14) and RBI (43). Brantly elected free agency following the season on November 7.

=== Cincinnati Reds ===
On December 3, 2016, Brantly signed a minor league contract with the Cincinnati Reds organization. In 2017, Brantly played in 46 games for the Triple-A Louisville Bats, hitting .298/.335/.435 with 5 home runs and 16 RBI. Brantly was released by Cincinnati on June 29.

=== Chicago White Sox (second stint) ===
On June 29, 2017, the same day as his release from Cincinnati, Brantly signed a minor league contract with the Chicago White Sox organization. Brantly was assigned to Triple-A Charlotte and was selected to the active roster on August 26 following an injury to Nicky Delmonico. In 14 games with the White Sox, he batted .290/.389/.516 with two home runs and five RBI in 31 at-bats. On October 4, Brantly was removed from the 40-man roster and sent outright to the Triple-A Charlotte Knights. He elected free agency on October 9.

=== Atlanta Braves ===
On December 22, 2017, Brantly signed a minor league contract with the Atlanta Braves organization. He was assigned to the Triple-A Gwinnett Stripers to begin the 2018 season and hit .218/.254/.293 in 58 games before being released on July 15.

=== Cleveland Indians ===
On July 21, 2018, Brantly signed a minor league contract with the Cleveland Indians organization. Brantly finished the year with the Triple-A Columbus Clippers, batting 7-for-41 (.171) in 16 games. On November 2, he elected free agency.

=== Philadelphia Phillies ===
On December 18, 2018, Brantly signed a minor league contract with the Philadelphia Phillies organization. He was assigned to the Triple-A Lehigh Valley IronPigs to begin the 2019 season. On July 12, Brantly was selected to the active roster. Brantly had 1 at-bat with the Phillies, a strikeout, and was designated for assignment the following day. In 82 games with Lehigh Valley, he batted .314/.404/.462 with 6 home runs and 28 RBI in 236 at-bats. He elected free agency on September 30.

=== San Francisco Giants ===
On January 18, 2020, Brantly signed a minor league contract with the San Francisco Giants organization. Brantly made the Opening Day roster in the COVID-19-shortened 2020 season, and was selected to the active roster on July 23. Brantly went 0-for-3 in one game with San Francisco before being designated for assignment on July 28.

=== New York Yankees ===
On August 26, 2020, Brantly was traded to the New York Yankees for cash considerations. Brantly did not play in a game for the Yankees organization due to the cancellation of the minor league season because of the COVID-19 pandemic. On October 13, he elected free agency.

On December 12, Brantly re-signed with the Yankees organization on a minor league contract and was invited to spring training. He was assigned to the Triple-A Scranton/Wilkes-Barre RailRiders to begin the 2021 season. On July 16, Brantly's contract was selected by the Yankees, after Kyle Higashioka tested positive for COVID-19 and was placed on the COVID-19 list. Brantly went 2-for-15 with a double and three strikeouts in 4 games for the Yankees. On July 26, Brantly was removed from the 40-man roster and returned to Triple-A Scranton. On August 5, he was promoted back to the majors when Gary Sánchez tested positive for COVID-19. Brantly went 1-for-5 in 2 games for the Yankees before being returned to Triple-A Scranton and removed from the 40-man roster on August 17. On October 5, Brantly was selected to the active roster prior to the American League Wild Card Game.

On November 5, 2021, Brantly was outrighted off of the 40-man roster and elected free agency. On December 10, Brantly re-signed with the Yankees on a new minor league contract. The Yankees promoted Brantly to the major leagues on May 22, 2022, when Higashioka went on the COVID-19 injured list. He was designated for assignment on May 25. The next day, he cleared waivers and was sent outright to Triple-A Scranton/Wilkes Barre. Brantly rejected the assignment and elected free agency, but re-signed with the Yankees on a minor league contract on May 29. Brantly played in 59 games for Scranton, slashing .269/.333/.352 with 1 home run and 22 RBI. He elected free agency following the season on November 10.

=== Toronto Blue Jays ===
On January 6, 2023, Brantly signed a minor league contract with the Toronto Blue Jays organization. In 46 games for the Triple-A Buffalo Bisons, he hit .271/.390/.361 with 1 home run and 16 RBI. On July 13, Brantly was released by Toronto.

=== Tampa Bay Rays ===
On January 7, 2024, Brantly signed a minor league contract with the Tampa Bay Rays. In 45 games for the Triple-A Durham Bulls, he slashed .262/.323/.418 with five home runs and 17 RBI. On August 19, the Rays selected Brantly's contract, adding him to their active roster. In three games for Tampa Bay, he went 1-for-9 (.111). Brantly was designated for assignment by the Rays on August 24. He cleared waivers and was sent outright to Durham on August 26. Brantly elected free agency on October 4.

=== Miami Marlins (second stint) ===
On February 4, 2025, Brantly signed a minor league contract with the Miami Marlins. On April 11, the Marlins selected Brantly's contract, adding him to their active roster. On April 21, after three games for the team, he was placed on the injured list due to a right lat strain. Brantly was transferred to the 60-day injured list on May 24. He was activated but subsequently designated for assignment by Miami on July 14. Brantly cleared waivers and was sent outright to the Triple-A Jacksonville Jumbo Shrimp on July 16. He was released by the Marlins organization on August 4.

=== New York Yankees (second stint) ===
On August 12, 2025, Brantly signed a minor league contract with the New York Yankees. He made two appearances for the Triple-A Scranton/Wilkes-Barre RailRiders, going 1-for-4 (.250). Brantly elected free agency following the season on November 6.
