= 2013 St. Louis Cardinals season =

Major League Baseball season

2013 St. Louis Cardinals
- National League champions National League Central champions
- League: National League
- Division: Central
- Ballpark: Busch Stadium
- City: St. Louis, Missouri
- Record: 97–65 (.599)
- Divisional place: 1st
- Owners: William DeWitt, Jr. Fred Hanser
- General managers: John Mozeliak
- Managers: Mike Matheny
- Television: Fox Sports Midwest (Dan McLaughlin, Al Hrabosky, Rick Horton)
- Radio: KMOX (1120AM); St. Louis Cardinals Radio Network (Mike Shannon, John Rooney, Al Hrabosky, Rick Horton, Mike Claiborne)
- Stats: ESPN.com; Baseball Reference

The 2013 St. Louis Cardinals season was the 132nd for the baseball team in St. Louis, Missouri, the 122nd season in the National League (NL), and the eighth at Busch Stadium III. On Opening Day, April 1, the St. Louis Cardinals played the 20,000th game in franchise history against the Arizona Diamondbacks, dating back to the start of their American Association (AA) play in 1882. Heading into the 2013 season, St. Louis had an all-time winning percentage of .518.

Early in the season, the Cardinals navigated around the loss of key players Chris Carpenter, Jason Motte, Rafael Furcal and Jaime García due to season-ending injuries. To offset these depletions, the St. Louis tapped heavily into their farm system. In a May game against the Colorado Rockies, rookie starting pitcher Shelby Miller set an all-time franchise record for a nine-inning game score of 98. Starter Adam Wainwright accumulated a franchise-record 34 2/3 innings (IP) before issuing his first walk on April 23 and earned NL Pitcher of the Month honors in June. First baseman Allen Craig produced the third-highest individual batting average with runners in scoring position at .454 as the Cardinals set an all-time Major League team record at .330. Rookie Matt Adams led the team in slugging percentage at .503. Second baseman Matt Carpenter, playing his first season at the position since turning professional, earned an All-Star selection as he led the Major Leagues in hits (199), runs scored (126), and doubles (55). In all, 20 rookies appeared in a game and the Cardinals collected 36 victories from their rookie pitchers. The 2013 edition set franchise records in fielding percentage (.988), pitching strikeouts (1254) and strikeouts per 9 innings pitched (7.73).

Holding off fierce competition from the Cincinnati Reds and Pittsburgh Pirates, the Cardinals clinched the division crown as each team won at least 90 games. The Cardinals finished the season with an NL-best 97–65 won–loss record. They opened the playoffs by defeating the Pirates in five games in the NLDS. Advancing to their third straight NLCS, they defeated the Los Angeles Dodgers in six games for their 19th NL pennant. Rookie Michael Wacha, who had nearly no-hit the Washington Nationals late in September, continued his dominance throughout the postseason as he allowed no runs against the Dodgers in 13 IP, earning the NLCS MVP. It was the second straight NLCS appearance to which manager Mike Matheny guided the Cardinals, who became the first manager to appear in an LCS in his first two seasons. Rookie closer Trevor Rosenthal extended a 20-inning postseason scoreless streak that started in the 2012 NLDS. The Cardinals met the Boston Red Sox in the World Series, only to lose the series in six games.

== Offseason acquisitions, departures and roster moves ==
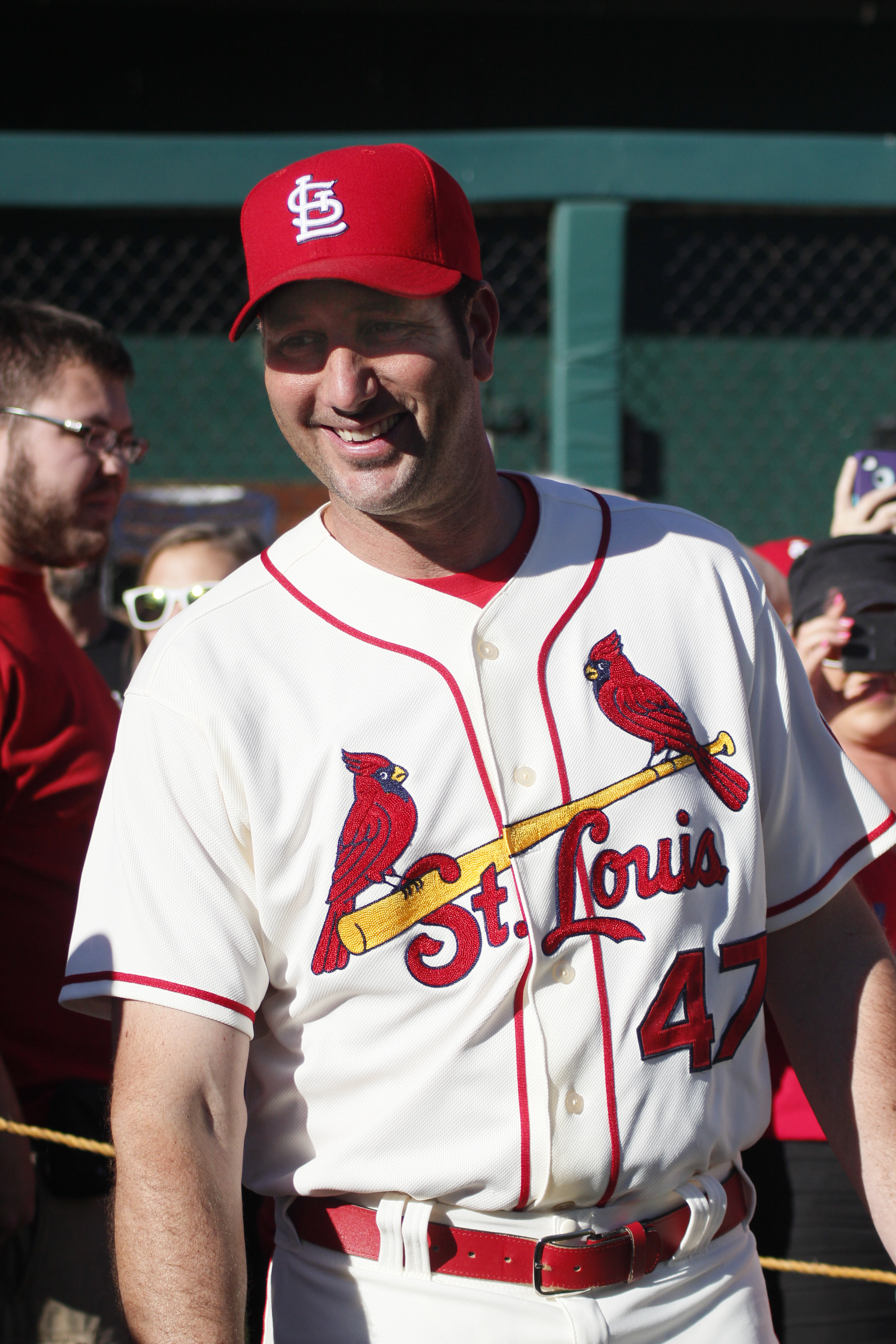
Coach John Mabry

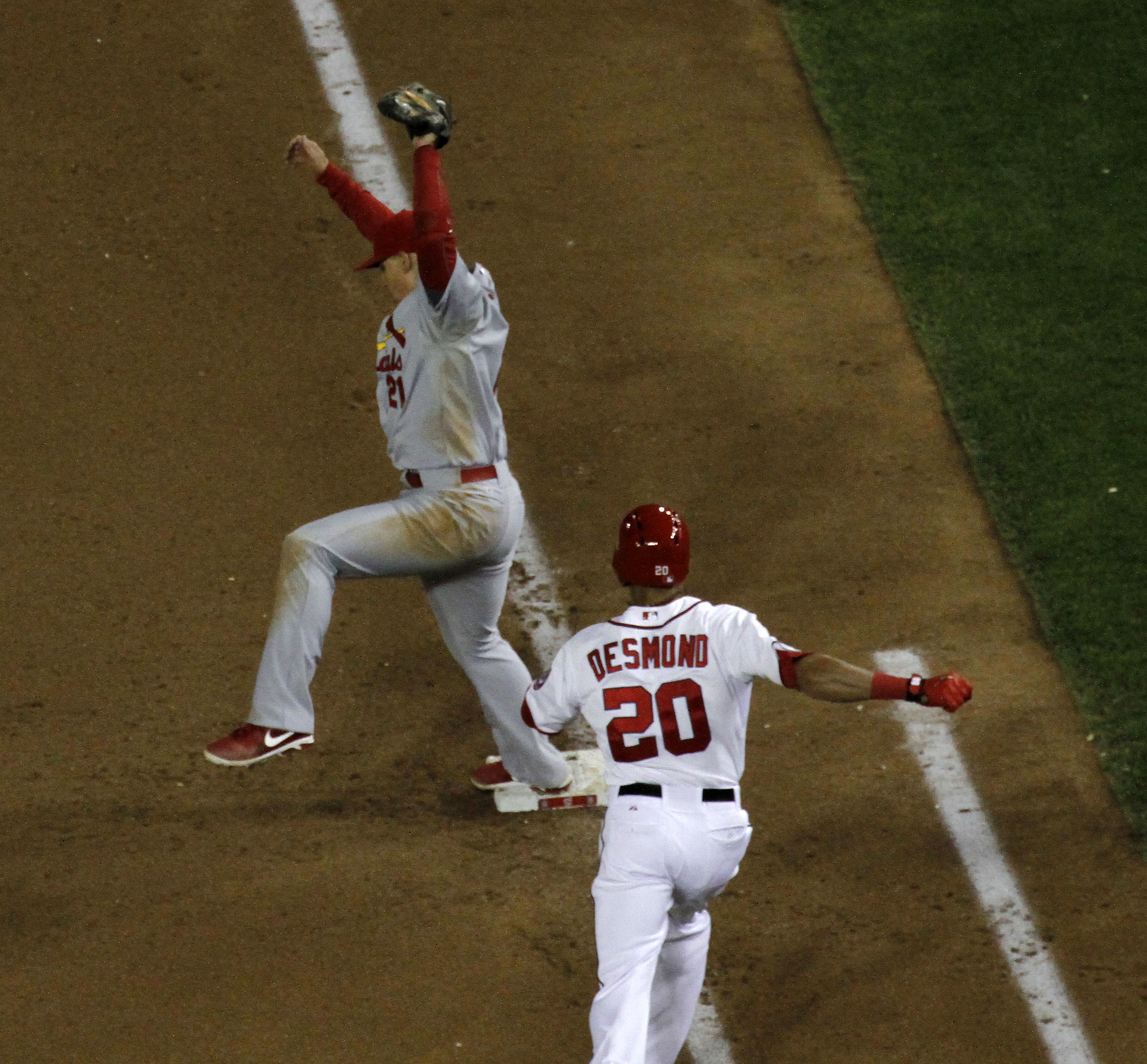
Allen Craig and Ian Desmond

=== Management and coaches ===
- October 25, 2012: Offered and retained all club coaches except bullpen coach Dyar Miller; no reason was cited.
- November 2, 2012: Hitting coach Mark McGwire declined a contract extension.
- November 5, 2012: Promoted assistant hitting coach John Mabry to hitting coach.
- November 5, 2012: Promoted AAA pitching coach Blaise Ilsley to major league bullpen coach.
- December 14, 2012: Hired Bengie Molina (Yadier's older brother) as assistant hitting coach.
- February 14: Extended GM John Mozeliak's contract by three years to end after the 2016 season. Record as Cardinals' GM: 439–371 (.542).
- February 14: Accepted manager Mike Matheny's 2014 option.

=== Hitters ===
- December 12, 2012: Traded second baseman Skip Schumaker to the Los Angeles Dodgers for minor league shortstop Jake Lemmerman.
- December 14, 2012: Signed infielder Ty Wigginton to a two-year contract worth $5 million.
- January 5: Free agent RF/1B Lance Berkman signed a one-year, $10 million contract with the Texas Rangers.
- January 28: Signed free agent shortstop Ronny Cedeño to a one-year deal worth $1.15 million.
- March 7: Placed shortstop Rafael Furcal on the 15-day disabled list for a torn ligament, who was unavailable for the season as underwent Tommy John surgery.
- March 8: Signed first baseman Allen Craig to a five-year contract worth $31 million, including a $13 million club option for 2018 and $1 million buyout.
- March 19: Released Cedeño, leaving the club responsible for 45 days or one-fourth of the original salary ($282,787).

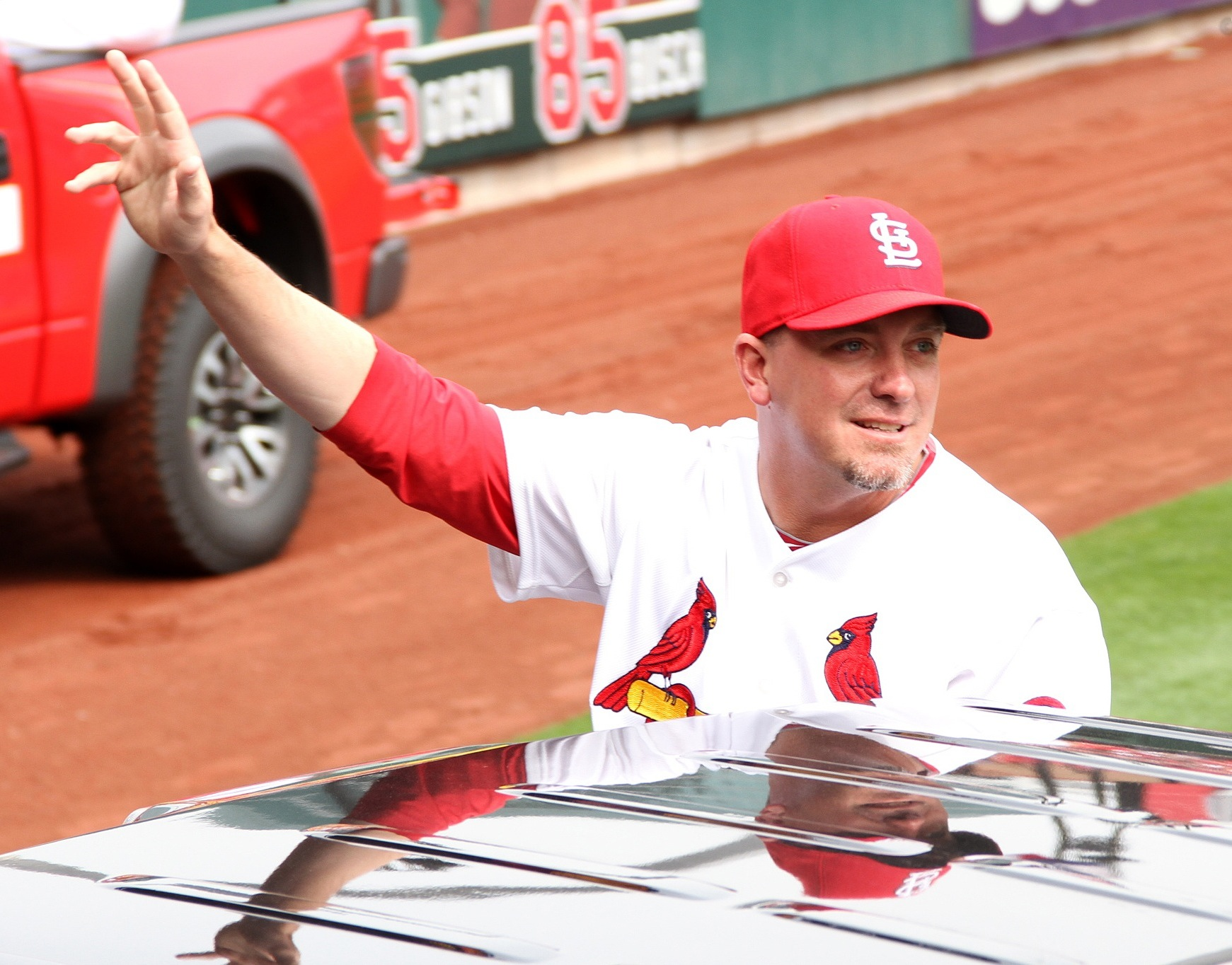
Randy Choate 2013

=== Pitchers ===
- October 30, 2012: Added right-hander Jorge Rondon to the 40-man roster when Lohse and Berkman were removed as free agents.
- November 9, 2012: Advanced Kyle Lohse an initial qualifying offer of $13.3 million, but he declined it to become a free agent. He signed with the Milwaukee Brewers on March 25. Under the terms of the current collective bargaining agreement, the Cardinals received a compensatory pick (#28) in the following June draft.
- November 13, 2012: Granted Kyle McClellan an unconditional release.
- December 7, 2012: Signed left-handed specialist Randy Choate to a three-year, $7.5 million contract.
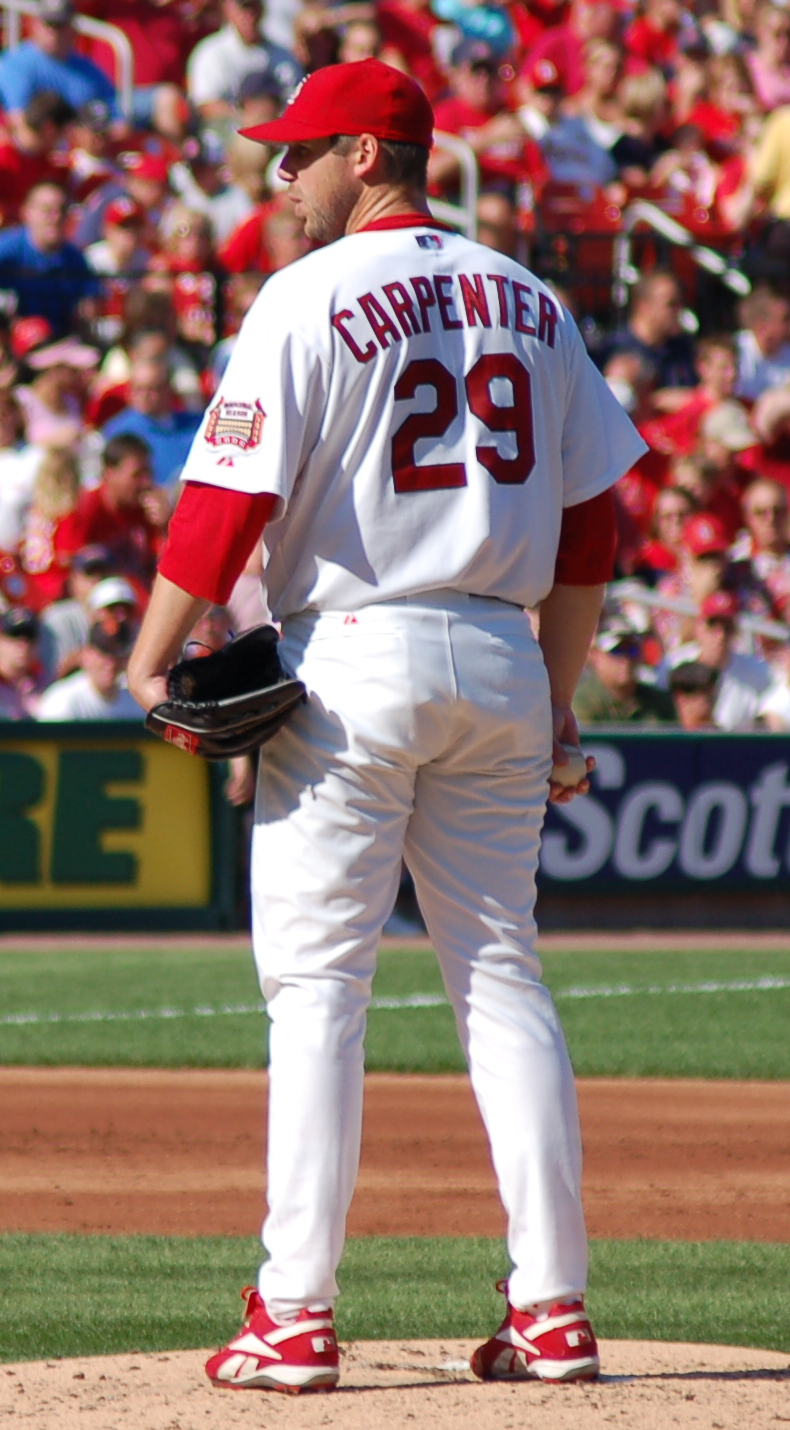
- Chris Carpenter
  January 28: Designated reliever Barret Browning for assignment when shortstop Cedeno was added to the 40-man roster.
- February 22: Placed right-hander Chris Carpenter on the 60-day disabled list due to persisting numbness and weakness in his pitching arm.
- March 27: Signed Adam Wainwright to a five-year extension for 2014–2018 worth $97.5 million.

=== Other offseason events ===
On February 5, the Cardinals announced that Chris Carpenter was unlikely to pitch this season as he continued to experience weakness and numbness in his pitching shoulder and arm. He ceased throwing exercises and commented that he does not desire further surgery. Despite pitching just six full seasons with the team, he is likely assured a place in Cardinals' team history.

Less than a week later, Carpenter announced he would not travel to the club's spring training site in Jupiter, Florida and instead remain in St. Louis, fearing he could be a distraction. At a press conference that same day, he said he still holds out hope of pitching in 2013, and refused to talk about retirement. On February 22, the team placed Carpenter on the 60-day disabled list.

== Spring training ==
Schedule and media. The club announced its 32-game spring schedule on November 30, 2012. The first game was February 23, and the last on March 29. Twelve games were nationally televised either on Fox Sports Midwest (10) or ESPN (2), starting on Monday March 11, 12:05 pm (CT) at New York Yankees, through Thursday March 28 against the Miami Marlins. (see also:National Broadcast Schedule)

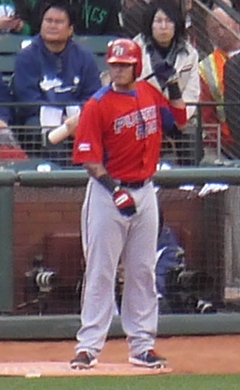
Yadier Molina on March 17, 2013

Classic Cardinals. Four Cardinals major leaguers participated in the World Baseball Classic tournament. Yadier Molina and Carlos Beltrán both represented the nation of Puerto Rico, who finished runner-up for the entire tournament. Relief pitchers Mitch Boggs pitched for the United States, Fernando Salas pitched for Mexico and minor leaguer Richard Castillo also pitched for Spain.

Martínez returns to the US. Long held over by visa problems in his native Dominican Republic, Carlos Martínez was finally granted reentry into the United States in the last week of March, and joined the minor league camp in Jupiter, Florida. With camp ending on April 1, he started more than six weeks past the pitchers' report date in mid-February. The #3 prospect in the Cardinals' system ended the 2012 season in Double-A (Springfield), where he posted a 2.90 ERA and held opponents to a .237 batting average in 15 games (14 starts).

Final spring training results. The Cardinals finished spring training on March 29 with a 16–15–1 record, and recorded 98,686 total attendance in 16 home games for an average of 6,168. They had a .282 team batting average with an NL-leading 4.20 team ERA. Last year, the team had a 16–9–2 record in spring training games with a .276 team batting average and 3.05 team pitching ERA, finishing 11th in the Grapefruit League. They drew 85,858 fans during 13 home games, averaging 6,604 fans per game.

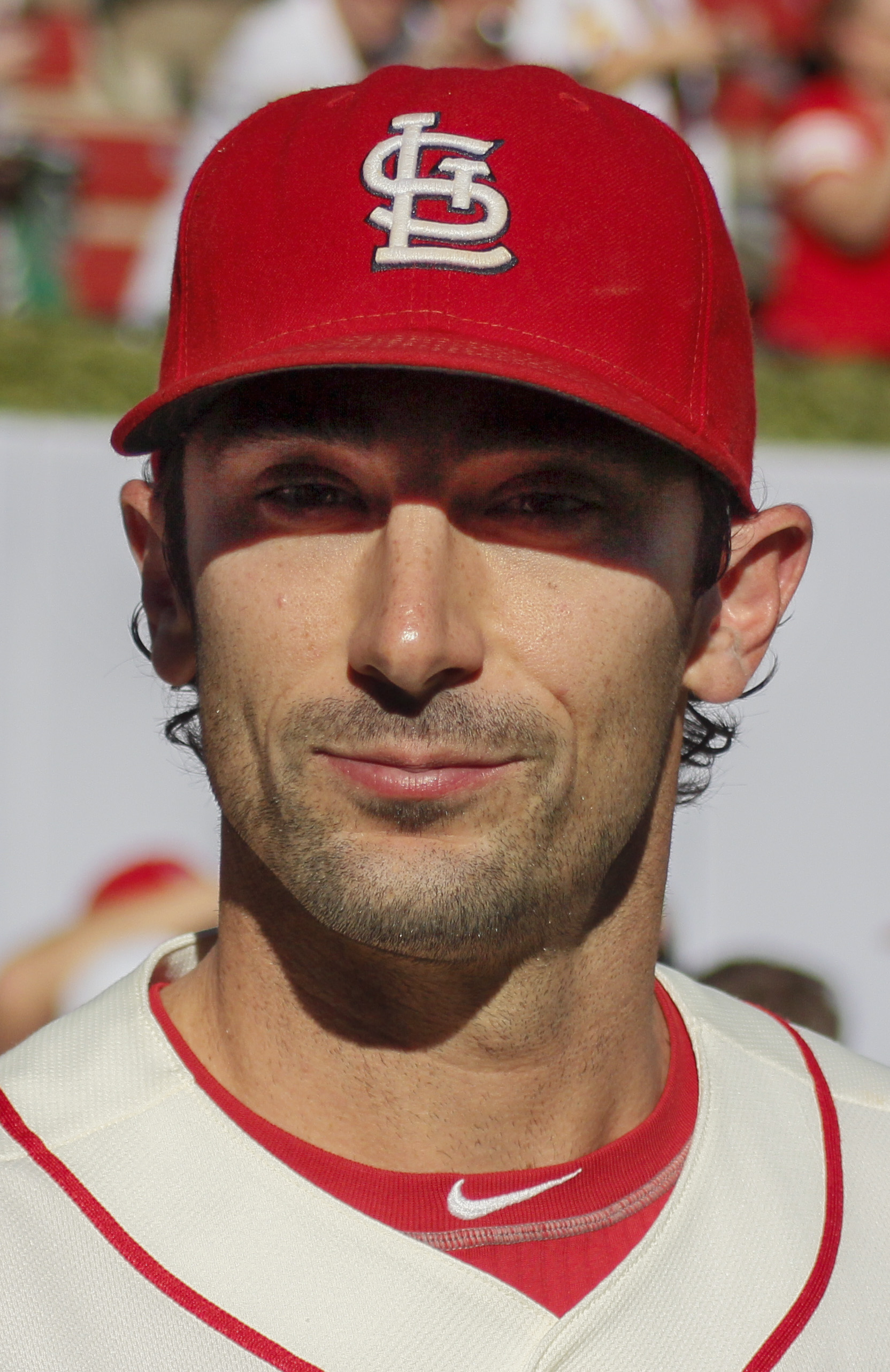
Matt Carpenter 2013

=== Openings ===
Middle infield. With shortstop Rafael Furcal's elbow (strained ulnar collateral ligament) cutting short his 2012 season, rest was thought to be the best option rather than surgery. However, Furcal was shut down for the season on March 3 due to the ligament not improving, and an announcement for Tommy John surgery followed on March 7.

Free-agent signee Ronny Cedeño was brought in to back up second and shortstop after Skip Schumaker's trade, but was released on March 19,. After an 18-inning tryout and an .828 OPS in 340 PAs as a rookie in 2012, utility player Matt Carpenter was advised to continue working out at second in the offseason, and was nominated for the regular job after spring. Pete Kozma became the starting shortstop and Daniel Descalso the backup to Carpenter and Kozma.

Starting pitching. With Chris Carpenter shifted to the 60-day disabled list, one spot for a starting pitcher opened. Competition fell between Joe Kelly and Shelby Miller. Miller won the spot, sporting an 11:5 strikeout to walk ratio and 17 hits in 16 innings, compared to Kelly's 2:6 and 15 hits in 13 innings, placing him in a bullpen role. Starter Lance Lynn reported to camp forty pounds lighter than in 2012, but ironically struggled to find his command as he attempted to pitch using a "new body."

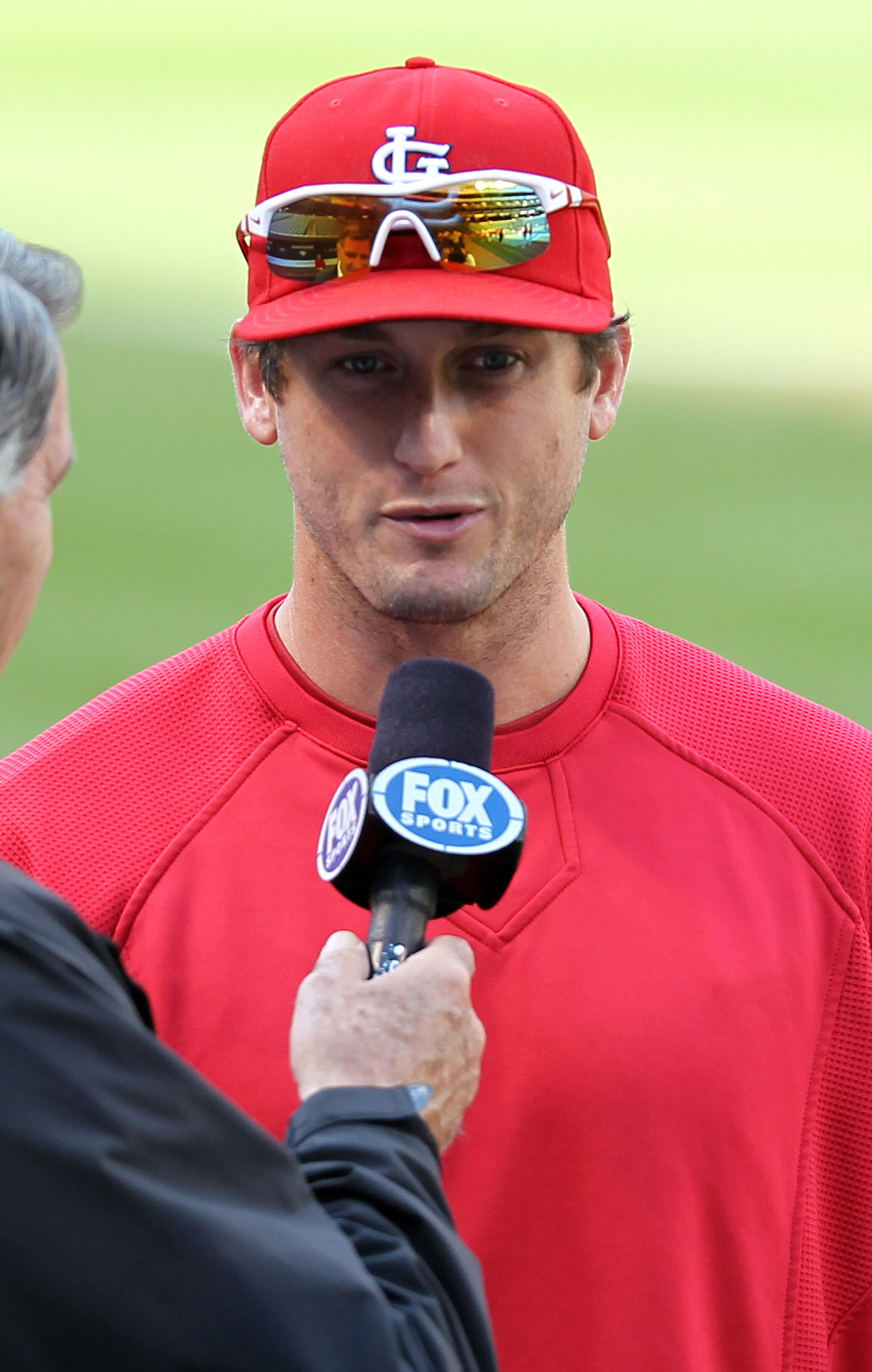
David Freese

Reserve roles. Thanks to a strong spring at the plate, former Cardinals Minor League Player of the Year Matt Adams made the team as a pinch-hitter and backup at first base. Rookie outfielder Óscar Taveras also made a strong impression, batting .289 with two home runs and 10 RBIs in 80 PAs. He started the season in the minors to allow "his development ... to be playing every day ... to handle the day-to-day rigors of the major league schedule", according to Mozeliak.

=== Injuries ===
Matheny underwent successful back surgery on March 11 to relieve pain and numbness caused by a ruptured disk.

On March 21, closer Jason Motte experienced tightness in his pitching elbow after pitching against the Mets. An MRI revealed a right flexor tendon strain. He began the season on the DL and Mozeliak was uncertain how much time he would miss. Mitch Boggs replaced Motte as closer until his return. On March 22, third baseman David Freese experienced back pain and was placed on the 15-day disabled list.

== Regular season ==
=== April ===
The salary for the players for the season comes to $116.8 mil. (Google spreadsheet), a 4.4% increase over the $111.9 mil. in 2012.(Opening Day salaries)

Opening day on April 8 showed the largest attendance in the history of Busch Stadium with 47,345. The Cardinals had a 4–2 lead after 6 inn. and a 4–3 lead after 7 inn., but the Reds scored a run in the 8th to tie it, and then scored 9 in the 9th to win going away, 13–4. It spoiled a fine performance by starter Jaime García who pitched effectively for 6.2 inn., giving up 6 hits, 3 runs, walking 3, and striking out 10. It was the first of 19 games between the two teams the experts believe are the best in the Central, and will battle it out for the title.

The team chartered an overall successful opening month, finishing with a 15–11 record (.577 winning percentage) and in first place in the NL Central. However, it was not without challenges: the rest of the division played also very competitively, with the Milwaukee Brewers, the Pittsburgh Pirates and the Cincinnati Reds each finished the month within one game of the Cardinals. An outstanding effort by the starting pitching won all 15 games in the month (2.15 ERA in 167 innings, and 1.152 WHIP with 8.2 SO per nine innings) and timely hitting (.350 BA, .940 OPS with RISP) covered for an otherwise dismal offense (.245 BA, 20 home runs and .677 OPS) and dysfunctional bullpen (0–5, 5.82 ERA in 66 innings). Starting pitcher Adam Wainwright began the season with 34 2/3 consecutive innings without issuing a walk, the longest such streak in team history since 1913, when Slim Sallee began the season with 40 consecutive innings (the team record). Wainwright led the league with 171 batters faced and in pitching 44 1/3 innings. Wainwright and Lance Lynn tied for the NL lead with four wins each, while Jake Westbrook led the league with a 0.98 ERA. Rookie Shelby Miller finished the month with a 2.05 ERA, 1.011 WHIP and 9.7 strikeouts per nine innings.

The team was only 6–5 at home, 9–6 on the road. They scored 117 runs, giving up 93.

=== May ===
Westbrook milestone. Jake Westbrook won his 100th game (against 96 losses) on May 2 after two previous attempts in which the game was lost after he left the game in the lead. His 1.07 ERA and a 351 ERA+ lead the league, spearheading a trend in common with the Cardinals rotation. To this point, the starters' aggregate 2.09 ERA led the majors and their 17–6 record led the NL, second in MLB only to the Boston Red Sox (17–4). Adam Wainwright's 2.03 ERA was eighth in the NL, and Shelby Miller's 2.05 ERA tenth. At 17–11, St. Louis' pitching staff had the second-lowest team ERA in the majors at 3.14, trailing only the Atlanta Braves at 3.10.

Motte done for season; rookies step up in débuts. On May 3, closer Jason Motte's prognosis showed no improvement and he underwent season-ending Tommy John (elbow ligament) reconstructive surgery the next week. However, two of the Cardinals' prized pitching prospects made their Major League débuts the same day: Carlos Martínez and Seth Maness each worked one scoreless inning after Miller's six innings in a 6–1 win over the Milwaukee Brewers, their fourth win in a row and seventh in ten games.

Carpenter's surprising progress. On May 4, Chris Carpenter announced that he felt no arm pain and that he hoped to contribute to a bullpen fix after resuming his throwing program. Mozeliak commented he could return in late June or early July. He threw an impressive fourth bullpen session of about 70 pitches on May 10, showing all his pitch types, and said afterwards he felt good and ready for a fifth session on May 13.

Back-to-back no-hit near-misses. On May 10, Shelby Miller continued his excellent season by throwing a one-hit, no-run, masterpiece at home in just his eighth career start, defeating the Colorado Rockies 3–0. Improving his record to 5–2, Miller lowered his ERA to a dazzling 1.58 and WHIP to 0.88. He retired the final 27 batters of 28 total after allowing a bloop single to the very first batter, Eric Young, Jr., throwing 84 of 113 pitches for strikes. With no other blemishes in his "near-perfect" game, Miller struck out a career-high 13, tying the Cardinals' rookie record held by Dick Hughes (1967), and Scipio Spinks (1972) in his first complete-game shutout in the majors and most distinguished start since his début in September 2012. It was also the most-distinguished start by a Cardinal rookie since Bud Smith threw a no-hitter in 2001. Miller also set a franchise record nine-inning game score of 98. The next game, Wainwright took a no-hitter into the eighth inning against the Rockies on his way to finishing the game with a two-hit, complete-game shutout, his NL-leading second shutout of the season. Combining Wainwright's and Miller's efforts, they retired 40 Rockies in a row – tying the major league record – and prevented a base hit for 51 batters in a row. It was only the fifth time in Cardinals' history that two successive starters have given up two hits or less. The last time was on May 2–3, 1967 when Bob Gibson and Ray Washburn each allowed two hits in complete game wins. Previous years this happened were in 1946, 1942, and 1927.

Infielders out-of-slump. David Freese, shaking off a 91 at-bat homerless slump, hit a grand slam for his first home run of the season in the first inning of a 7–6 victory over the Milwaukee Brewers on May 17. Four days later, infielder Daniel Descalso hit a grand slam of his own in a 10–2 romp over San Diego.

Rookies bail out veterans. Rookie pitchers played a key role the first two months of the season, bailing out the pitching staff beset with numerous injuries and ineffectiveness. Starting pitcher Jaime García was yet another casualty, with season-ending shoulder surgery on May 24. With Michael Wacha's call up on May 30, he became the eighth rookie pitcher on the young season and the third in the month of May to début starting a game. After a 4–1 victory over the Kansas City Royals, rookies accounted for 134 of the Cardinals' 457 innings for the season, sporting a 2.35 ERA. For the month, the rookies combined to go 10–2 with a 2.23 ERA. The overall staff ERA was a major-league leading 3.07. This game left the Cardinals with a major-league best 34–17 record.

On cover of Sports Illustrated. The five starters as of Opening Day (Adam Wainwright, Shelby Miller, Jaime García, Lance Lynn, and Jake Westbrook) were the main story and on the cover of Sports Illustrated (May 27), mirroring the famous 1968 SI cover pose with Roger Maris, Tim McCarver, Bob Gibson, Mike Shannon, and Lou Brock. At the time of the magazine's release, two (Garcia and Westbrook) were on the disabled list. It was the 39th time the Cardinals have made the cover.

Cardinals have youngest pitching staff in baseball. After Michael Wacha, 21, made his debut on May 30, the Cardinals have the youngest pitching staff in baseball, averaging only 25.0 years in age. The team has used nine rookies and eight pitchers are younger than 25. The rookie pitchers have combined for an MLB-leading 12 wins.

Craziest game of the year. The nine-inning game on May 30, was officially only 2:27 in time, but that didn't count the one-hour rain delay prior to the original start time of 7:15 pm, and then the 4:32 delay in the top of the ninth inning from 10:32 pm to 3:04 am, finally with the game ending at 3:14 am on May 31. The reason to wait out the long rain delay was because it was the last trip the Kansas City Royals make to St. Louis, and Rule 4.12(b)(4) would apply, so the Royals persuaded umpire Joe West to keep the game from being called and their three runs in the top of the ninth to be wiped out with them losing 2–1 after eight full innings. They won the argument, and the game 4–2. The game's total 5:32 rain delay was the longest in baseball since October 3, 1999, when the Cincinnati Reds-Milwaukee Brewers had a 5:47 delay. Although not saddled with the loss, rookie starter Michael Wacha, 21, in his major-league debut lost the chance for a win after dazzling the fans and television audience in retiring the first 13 batters he faced. He gave up a total of just two hits and one run, walking one and striking out six in his seven full innings, holding a 2–1 lead until reliever Mitchell Boggs gave up a game-tying home run leading off the top of the ninth. The game-ending time at 3:14 am was the latest ever for a game at Busch Stadium. Wacha had thrown only 73.2 IP in the minors before his call-up and debut. He threw only 93 pitches (67 for strikes), facing 23 batters, retiring 21 of them. His 93 pitches were mostly 92-96 mph fastballs, then change-ups, with only three curveballs. He kept two souvenir balls: his first strikeout (Alex Gordon), and the ball he got a single in his first at-bat. Mitchell Boggs returned to the Cardinals to help the bullpen after 18 days (May 2–20), blew Michael Wacha's 2–1 lead in his debut on May 30, and was demoted a second time to AAA-Memphis the next day, May 31. Boggs' 2013 year now reads: 18 games played in, 0–3, with an 11.05 ERA, 21 hits, 15 walks, 11 strikeouts, and a 2.455 WHIP in 14.2 IP.

Shelby Miller wins award. Shelby Miller won the MLB.com's Pitching Performance of the Month award for May because of his one-hit game on May 10. He was 2–1, walking only six and striking out 32 for the month, while leading the NL with a 1.82 ERA.

For May, the team was 9–4 at home and 11–3 on the road. St. Louis scored 133 runs while giving up 85. (Year: 35–18, 250 runs scored, 178 runs against)

=== June ===
David Freese's 20-game hit streak. David Freese's major-league leading 20-game hit streak came to an end on June 12 at Citi Field, with his batting average climbing from .209 to .281. He drove in 16 runs during his streak that started with a grand slam on May 17.

Draft pick signings. The Cardinals reached agreements with their three top draft picks from June 6–8, on June 12. LHP's Marco Gonzales (1st, 19th overall), Rob Kaminsky (1st, 28th overall), and SS Oscar Mercado (2nd, 57th overall) along with six other draftees. No announcement will be made until they pass a physical next week. Mercado signed on June 17 ($1.5 mil.), and will report to the Gulf Coast League Cardinals rookie team in Jupiter, Florida. Other drafted signees include right fielder Ricardo Bautista (12th round), center fielder DeAndre Asbury-Heath (15th round), shortstop Michael Schulze (19th round), center fielder Anthony Ray (36th round), and right-handers Arturo Reyes (40th round) and Brandon Lee (undrafted). First round pick LHP Kaminsky signed on June 18 ($1.785 mil.), and will also report to the Gulf Coast League Cardinals. Nine players signed on June 18, seven draftees and two free agents, for a total of 31 drafted and four free agents. First pick, LHP Marco Gonzales rated #28 in the Top 500 prospects by Baseball America, signed on June 19 ($1.85 mil.), and will also report to the Gulf Coast League Cardinals. Gonzales had a 7–3 2.80 ERA in 16 starts for the Gonzaga Bulldogs, and also led the team in hitting with a .311 average.

Yadier Molina leading NL hitters. A rarity when a catcher is leading a league in batting. But Yadier Molina is doing that in the NL with his .358 (.3578, 83-in-232) mark after the June 12 game when he went 3-for-4, boosting his average from the NL-leading .351 in the game before. Second place is Troy Tulowitzki (CO Rockies) with a .347 average. Miguel Cabrera (Det. Tigers) is leading the majors and the AL also with a .358 (.3583) average, just .0005 over Molina for the MLB lead.

Adam Wainwright wins 10th. On June 13, Adam Wainwright became the first MLB pitcher in 2013 to win 10 games, pitching seven scoreless innings as the Cardinals beat the New York Mets 2–1 at Citi Field. He scattered four hits, and struck out six in the victory. Wainwright achieved a career milestone early in the game as his first strikeout of the day, on David Wright, was the 1,000th of his career. He has a career 133 ERA+, the 4th highest for an active pitcher who has a minimum of 1,000 innings.

Cardinals, a model franchise. Richard Justice, a columnist for MLB.com, wrote on June 14, the Cardinals have the 11th-highest payroll, but enjoy its best record (43–23 .652 with a 3 1/2-game lead), with the 11th–1st difference indicating in a nutshell why the club has a great baseball organization.

Only 3rd series lost, June 14–16. The Cardinals lost a 2-of-3 series to the Miami Marlins, only the 3rd series lost in the season (after 69 games) since a 2-of-3 loss to the Pittsburgh Pirates on April 26–28. The team still leads MLB with a 44–25 (.638) record, and first place in the NL Central by 2 1/2 over the Cincinnati Reds. The team leads MLB in a .342 batting average with RISP (runners in scoring position), while the Chicago Cubs have the worst batting average with a .226 when RISP.

Adam Wainwright wins NL Pitcher of Month award. Adam Wainwright was named NL Pitcher of the Month for June with a 4–2 1.77 ERA record. He struck out 40 while issuing only six walks, holding opposing batters to a .220 average. For the year, he is 11–5 with a 2.22 ERA, leading all of baseball with four complete games and a 9.5 strikeout-to-walk ratio.

=== July ===
Jon Jay's errorless streak record. On July 4, Jon Jay established a new NL all-time errorless streak record for centerfielders at 227 games (534 chances) against the Los Angeles Angels of Anaheim, and the Cardinals outfield record; his last error was on August 24, 2011. On July 30, the streak ended against the division rivals Pittsburgh Pirates at 245 games. Curt Flood owned the previous record of 226 games spanning from September 3, 1965 to June 2, 1967.

Five Cardinals selected for All-Star Game. On July 6, five Cardinals were announced to be in the 84th All-Star Game on July 16, the most for any NL team. Yadier Molina (.346, 6 HR, 45 RBIs) garnered the most votes in the National League with over 6.8 million while winning the spot as the starting catcher. At the All-Star break, he led the NL with a .346 batting average. Carlos Beltrán (.305, 19 HR, 51 RBIs) received the highest vote total for outfielders. Matt Carpenter (.319, 8 HR, 37 RBIs), the Cardinals' leadoff hitter, led the NL with 34 multihit games and was a reserve at second base. Pitcher Adam Wainwright (11–5, 2.36 ERA, 120 H, 3 HR, 13 BB, 117 K in 18 GS, 133.2 IP) was picked by the fans, leading the NL in innings pitched. Allen Craig (.325, 10 HR, 68 RBIs) was selected by manager Bruce Bochy. He also led the NL with a .476 batting average with men in scoring position, and was second in the league with 68 RBIs. Wainwright had the option of remaining on the active All-Star roster and pitching a maximum of one inning, per a new CBA rule that amended the previous rule that stopped pitchers who pitched the previous Sunday from pitching in the game. He received the fourth-most pitcher votes.

Team led MLB in BA w/RISP. After the first 106 games played (July 31; 62–44), the team led MLB with a .333 BA with RISP. Second were the Detroit Tigers with a .294. The .333 batting average is the best in over 50 years and so far ahead of Detroit, the Cardinals could go hitless with RISP in the next 131 at-bats, still lead the majors, and go hitless in their next 235 at-bats and still lead the NL. Allen Craig led the NL with a .465 average, Matt Carpenter was third (.400), and Yadier Molina fifth (.385). Carlos Beltrán (.367) and Matt Holliday (.365) were also in the top nine in the NL. Craig's figure was the highest in a season since George Brett (.469) in 1980.

=== August ===
Ended L.A.'s 15-game road win streak. The home game win on August 6 against their ace Clayton Kershaw (10–6, 1.87), highlighted by four double plays (fourth time in a 2013 game), ended the L.A. Dodgers fourth-best in MLB history's 15-game road winning streak. The 1912 Washington Senators had 16, and the record of 17 stays with the 1916 New York Giants, later tied by the 1984 Detroit Tigers. The Cardinals 134 double plays turned lead all of MLB, including an NL-leading 12 by reliever Seth Maness who has turned them in only 39.1 IP. The team (66–46) stayed two games behind the NL Central leading Pirates, while the Dodgers (62–50) continue leading the NL West over Arizona by five games.

Kolten Wong arrives. On August 16, Kolten Wong, the number 4 top prospect in the organization, arrived from AAA-Memphis, and was immediately placed sixth in the lineup playing his second base position against the Cubs. He batted .303 with a .369 OBP in 107 games at AAA, stealing 20 bases in 21 attempts. He becomes the 18th rookie to appear for the Cardinals this season, tops among MLB teams and the most used by the Cardinals since 1997 when they had 19.

Wainwright passes Bob Forsch, Chris Carpenter in strikeouts. On August 18, Adam Wainwright passed Bob Forsch (1,079) for fourth place on the all-time Cardinals' strikeout list, behind only Chris Carpenter (1,085), Dizzy Dean (1,095), and Bob Gibson (3,117) with his 1,081st against the Cubs at Wrigley Field in striking out 11, and winning for career win 94 against 55 losses for a .631 win percentage. Wainwright became only the fourth pitcher to go 6–0 in his career at that 99-year-old storied stadium. With the win, Wainwright ties for the NL lead in wins with 14 along with the Nationals' Jordan Zimmermann. With his NL-leading 15th win on August 23 (at home), he struck out nine Braves giving him 1,090 strikeouts, passing teammate Chris Carpenter for third place. He also pitched a complete game, giving him an NL-leading five, and 16 for his career. His ERA as a Cardinal is 3.06 compared to 3.07 for Carpenter.

Broadcaster Mike Shannon has successful heart surgery. Radio voice Mike Shannon had successful heart surgery on August 19, to repair a defective aorta valve. The surgery had been planned for some time, and he will make a complete recovery. He will miss most of the remainder of the season, but plans to return on September 23. The team will employ a broadcasting rotation of Al Hrabosky, Rick Horton, and Mike Claiborne to join his regular co-broadcaster John Rooney until then.

Cardinals expect to add 5–10 callups in September. GM John Mozeliak expects a larger number of callups than usual in September, between five and 10, when rosters expand starting on Sunday, September 1. The team plays 29 games over the final 31 days of the regular season. A callup must be on the 40-man roster. There is one open spot on the 40-man roster.

Cardinals regain sole possession of first place. Opening a critical stretch of 13 games against their two top contenders, the Pittsburgh and Cincinnati, the game on August 26 had the Cardinals climb out of a steep 4–0 deficit after two innings, on two big home run blasts by Matt Holliday and Allen Craig. Holliday's 3-run HR in the third inning was a mammoth 442-foot blast into Big Mac land, cutting the deficit to only 4–3. Craig's very first grand slam in the seventh was a memorable one, highlighting a five-run inning, giving them the lead, 8–5 at the time. He is 6-for-7 with the bases loaded with two outs, and 7-for-10 with the bases loaded, giving him 15 RBIs of his 95 total. It was Craig's 50th career home run, and increased his now MLB-leading .452 average (57-for-126 with 4 HRs and 82 RBIs with a .500 OBP and .643 SLG) with runners in scoring position. His 95 RBIs are second in the NL only to the 103 by Paul Goldsmith of the Arizona Diamondbacks and tied with Brandon Phillips of the Reds. Jon Jay helped with two great catches in centerfield, and Edward Mujica got his 35th save out of 36 opportunities. The Reds with the tough loss fell 3 1/2 games in back of the Cardinals, with the Cardinals winning 9 of 13 against them so far this season. The final score was 8–6, with Carlos Martinez getting his first major league win, on a hot night with 93 degrees at the 6:05 game time (on ESPN), and 35,159 in attendance.

Cards acquire RHP reliever John Axford. The Cardinals acquired Milwaukee Brewers closer John Axford, 30, on August 30, in exchange for a player to be named later. No cash changed hands, leaving the Cardinals to pay Axford the approximately $1 mil. remaining on his $5 mil. 2013 contract. He is eligible for arbitration after the season, and the Cardinals can either non-tender him after the season or work out a new contract for him. He has not saved a game in 2013, and has a 4.45 ERA in 62 games. This is the first deal between the Cardinals and Brewers in 10 years. This is the first deal the Cardinals have done this season to add to the club, and needed to be done before the August 31 deadline so Axford could be on the postseason roster.

=== September ===
Matt Carpenter ties Hornsby's doubles record. Matt Carpenter hit his 46th double on September 4, tying Rogers Hornsby's mark for a Cardinals' hitter who primarily plays second base. He broke Hornsby's record with his NL-leading 47th double on September 6, also leading the NL in Hits (172) and Runs (110), and is a serious contender for the MVP Award.

Wainwright now second in strikeouts. Adam Wainwright struck out eight batters in the September 7 game at home against the first-place Pittsburgh Pirates for 1,103 strikeouts in his career, passing Dizzy Dean (1,095) for second place among Cardinals' pitchers. Only Bob Gibson (3,117 in 528 games) has more strikeouts. He threw seven shutout innings giving the Pirates only two hits and two walks, picking up his league-leading 16th win against nine losses, and a 3.03 ERA. He now has 195 strikeouts for the season, second only to the L.A. Dodgers' Clayton Kershaw who has 201. The win also pushed the Cardinals back into first-place by just 1/2 game in the see-saw Central division against the Pirates, and only 1 1/2 games ahead of the Cincinnati Reds. Wainwright was coming off the two worst games of his career, giving up 15 earned runs and 17 hits in those two games totaling eight innings. He leads the NL in wins (tied), innings pitched (213.2), hits giving up (198), games started (30), and batters faced (846).

10 consecutive years over 3 million. For the 10th consecutive year starting in 2004, the Cardinals attained over 3 million attendance with 40,506 in the 10-inn. 2–1 win over the visiting Seattle Mariners on September 13. After this 73rd home game, the attendance totals 3,037,191 for an average of 41,605 per game.

Mujica removed as Closer. Edward Mujica was removed as closer on September 21, because of fatigue. He has 37 saves, but failed to convert three out of his last five chances.

Carpenter breaks Musial's record for Doubles. Matt Carpenter broke Stan Musial's record for doubles (53 in 1953) by a left-handed batter with his 54th on September 21. Joe Medwick owns the Cardinals' record with 64 in 1936. Carpenter's .328 BA, 67 RBI, 61 extra-base hits, 105 runs, and .488 slugging pct. are tops amongst all Major League leadoff men, and his 194 hits are tops in the NL. He led the majors with his 55 doubles, 126 runs scored, 199 hits, and 63 multi-hit games. He also set the Busch Stadium III record with 112 hits. He hit .318 ranking sixth in the NL, and fourth in hitting with runners in scoring position with his .388.

Cardinals clinch playoff berth. With the Washington Nationals losing to the Miami Marlins on September 22, the St. Louis Cardinals clinch a playoff berth. Manager Mike Matheny becomes the first Cardinals' manager to take his team to the playoffs in his first two seasons since Gabby Street did it with the 1930 and 1931 Cardinals.

Shannon returns to radio booth. Radio broadcaster Mike Shannon (74) returned to the radio booth for the remaining six games, all at home, starting September 23. He was out for almost six weeks since before his August 19 heart aorta valve replacement surgery.

Michael Wacha almost throws no-hitter. Rookie Michael Wacha (22), acquired in the 2012 draft with the 19th overall pick from the Los Angeles Angels as compensation for losing Albert Pujols almost threw a no-hitter at home on September 24, against the Washington Nationals. He pitched 8.2 innings and 112 pitches (77 for strikes) with no hits, two walks, and one error against him before a little squibbler in the infield became the only hit against him. He struck out nine. He was then relieved on the final out for his fourth win of the season. He has pitched only 64.2 innings in the majors in 2013. He became the third pitcher to lose a no-hitter with two outs in the ninth this year, and it would have been the 11th no-hitter in Cardinals' history, with the last one in September 2001 by Bud Smith, who coincidentally wore uniform 52, same as Wacha. The 1-hitter was the second in 2013 for a Cardinals' pitcher: Shelby Miller gave up a hit to the first batter, and then retired the next 27 on May 10.

Lohse continues to pay dividends. Kyle Lohse, who made news earlier in the year by rejecting the Cardinals' $13.3 million qualifying and signing with the Brewers with one week to go in spring training, continued to aid the Cardinals as they pursued the Central division title and best record in the NL for home-field advantage until the World Series. Lohse threw his first complete game of the season against the Red in a 5–1 victory on September 13, dropping the Reds 3 1/2 games behind the Cardinals. On September 25, Lohse threw his second complete game and first shutout of the season, a two-hit, 2–0 triumph over the Atlanta Braves. This win allowed the Cardinals to move ahead of the Braves by 1/2 game for best record in the NL.

Cardinals clinch NL Central on September 27. The Cardinals clinched the NL Central title at home on September 27. It was their first NL Central title since 2009. It was their seventh division title since 2000, thanks to 20 rookies, 12 of them had never before appeared in the majors before this year. They were second three consecutive years prior to 2013. The club has a 16–6 record since Allen Craig was lost for the remainder of the regular season on September 4, with a foot injury. The club previously lost their ace (Chris Carpenter), their shortstop (Rafael Furcal), and their closer (Jason Motte) before Opening Day, plus two more starting pitchers in May and then cleanup hitter Craig, who has the majors highest batting average (.454) with runners in scoring position. He has been ruled doubtful for the 2013 National League Division Series against the Pittsburgh Pirates, because of his Lisfranc injury to his left foot.

Cardinals set new RISP mark, other highlights. The team set a new baseball record for hitting efficiency with runners in scoring position. They hit .330 (447-for-1,355), the best in baseball since the Boston Red Sox hit .312 in 1950, also beating the 2007 Detroit Tigers, and 1996 Colorado Rockies with a .311 average. Only George Brett (.469 in 1980) and Tony Gwynn (.459 in 1997) did better than Allen Craig, with his .454 led everyone in 2013. Freddie Freeman (Atlanta Braves) at .443 was second, with Matt Holliday at .390 third, Matt Carpenter at .388 fourth, Carlos Beltrán at .374 fifth, and Yadier Molina at .373 sixth. Molina's 44 doubles (#2 in NL, #3 in MLB) were the most by a catcher since Iván Rodríguez had 47 in 1996. With 19 wins, Adam Wainwright is the third Cardinals pitcher to lead the league in wins twice in his career (2009 and this season, when he tied with Washington's Jordan Zimmermann), joining Mort Cooper and Dizzy Dean. Bob Gibson led just once, in 1970 with 23. The Cardinals' 36 wins from rookies this season are the most since 1941. The Cardinals set a franchise record for fewest errors, with 75 and highest fielding percentage .988 beating their 2003 season with 77 errors and .987 average. They hit .305 with runners in scoring position and two outs. They hit .370 with the bases loaded with four grand slams. They had the second-lowest staff ERA 3.42 which is second only to the L.A. Dodgers 3.13.

== Season standings ==
=== National League Central ===
NL Central
Team	W	L	Pct.	GB	Home	Road
St. Louis Cardinals	97	65	.599	—	54‍–‍27	43‍–‍38
Pittsburgh Pirates	94	68	.580	3	50‍–‍31	44‍–‍37
Cincinnati Reds	90	72	.556	7	49‍–‍31	41‍–‍41
Milwaukee Brewers	74	88	.457	23	37‍–‍44	37‍–‍44
Chicago Cubs	66	96	.407	31	31‍–‍50	35‍–‍46

=== National League Wild Card ===
Wild Card Standings

Division winners
Team	W	L	Pct.
St. Louis Cardinals	97	65	.599
Atlanta Braves	96	66	.593
Los Angeles Dodgers	92	70	.568

Wild Card teams (Top 2 teams qualify for postseason)
Team	W	L	Pct.	GB
Pittsburgh Pirates	94	68	.580	+4
Cincinnati Reds	90	72	.556	—
Washington Nationals	86	76	.531	4
Arizona Diamondbacks	81	81	.500	9
San Francisco Giants	76	86	.469	14
San Diego Padres	76	86	.469	14
Colorado Rockies	74	88	.457	16
New York Mets	74	88	.457	16
Milwaukee Brewers	74	88	.457	16
Philadelphia Phillies	73	89	.451	17
Chicago Cubs	66	96	.407	24
Miami Marlins	62	100	.383	28

Performance against American League teams

Team	W-L Record
L.A. Angels of Anaheim	1–2
Houston Astros	3–1
Kansas City Royals	3–1
Oakland Athletics	1–2
Seattle Mariners	2–1
Texas Rangers	0–3
Totals	10–10

Performance against National League teams

2013 National League record Source: MLB Standings Grid – 2013
Team	AZ	ATL	CHC	CIN	COL	LAD	MIA	MIL	NYM	PHI	PIT	SD	SF	STL	WSH	AL
Arizona	—	2–4	4–3	3–4	12–7	10–9	4–2	6–1	3–4	3–4	3–3	7–12	7–12	4–3	2–4	11–9
Atlanta	4–2	—	5–1	4–3	6–1	5–2	13–6	2–4	10–9	11–8	4–3	1–5	3–4	4–3	13–6	11–9
Chicago	3–4	1–5	—	5–14	3–3	1–6	4–3	6–13	3–3	3–3	7–12	3–4	4–3	7–12	3–4	13–7
Cincinnati	4–3	3–4	14–5	—	2–4	4–3	6–1	10–9	4–2	4–2	8–11	3–3	6–1	8–11	3–4	11–9
Colorado	7–12	1–6	3–3	4–2	—	10–9	3–4	4–2	3–4	3–4	4–2	12–7	9–10	3–4	3–4	5–15
Los Angeles	9–10	2–5	6–1	3–4	9–10	—	5–2	4–2	5–1	5–2	4–2	11–8	8–11	4–3	5–1	12–8
Miami	2–4	6–13	3–4	1–6	4–3	2–5	—	1–5	11–8	7–12	2–4	3–4	4–3	2–4	5–14	9–11
Milwaukee	1–6	4–2	13–6	9–10	2–4	2–4	5–1	—	4–3	5–2	7–12	3–4	5–2	5–14	3–4	6–14
New York	4–3	9–10	3–3	2–4	4–3	1–5	8–11	3–4	—	10–9	2–5	4–3	4–2	2–5	7–12	11–9
Philadelphia	4–3	8–11	3–3	2–4	4–3	2–5	12–7	2–5	9–10	—	3–4	4–2	3–3	2–5	8–11	7–13
Pittsburgh	3–3	3–4	12–7	11–8	2–4	2–4	4–2	12–7	5–2	4–3	—	3–4	4–3	10–9	4–3	15–5
San Diego	12–7	5–1	4–3	3–3	7–12	8–11	4–3	4–3	3–4	2–4	4–3	—	8–11	2–4	2–5	8–12
San Francisco	12–7	4–3	3–4	1–6	10–9	11–8	3–4	2–5	2–4	3–3	3–4	11–8	—	2–4	3–3	6–14
St. Louis	3–4	3–4	12–7	11–8	4–3	3–4	4–2	14–5	5–2	5–2	9–10	4–2	4–2	—	6–0	10–10
Washington	4–2	6–13	4–3	4–3	4–3	1–5	14–5	4–3	12–7	11–8	3–4	5–2	3–3	0–6	—	11–9

== Schedule and results ==
=== Game log ===
Major League Baseball released the 2013 schedule of all 30 major teams on September 12, 2012. On Opening Day, the Cardinals played the Arizona Diamondbacks at Chase Field in Phoenix, Arizona, on April 1 at 9:10 pm CDT and was nationally televised on ESPN2 as part of its Opening Day marathon. Fox Sports Midwest (FSMW) televised 150 games. FSMW hired former Cardinals center fielder Jim Edmonds to replace former pitcher Cal Eldred as the primary analyst for pregame and postgame shows.

Schedule: Calendar style | Sortable text | National Broadcast Schedule (Cardinals), EDT || Downloadable: Microsoft Outlook and Palm (PDA)
All game times below were in the Central Time Zone (CST).

Legend
Cardinals Win	Cardinals Loss	Game Postponed / Tie

2013 Game Log
April (15–11) (.577)

#	Date	Opponent / Time	Score	Win	Loss	Save	Attendance	Record
1	April 1	@ Diamondbacks 9:10 pm (ESPN2)	6–2	Kennedy (1–0)	Wainwright (0–1)		48,033	0–1
2	April 2	@ Diamondbacks 8:40 pm	6–1	García (1–0)	Cahill (0–1)		28,387	1–1
3	April 3	@ Diamondbacks 8:40 pm	10–9 (16)	Collmenter (1–0)	Salas (0–1)		26,896	1–2
4	April 5	@ Giants 3:35 pm	1–0	Zito (1–0)	Westbrook (0–1)	Romo (3)	41,581	1–3
5	April 6	@ Giants 3:05 pm (Fox)	6–3	Miller (1–0)	Vogelsong (0–1)	Boggs (1)	41,402	2–3
6	April 7	@ Giants 3:05 pm	14–3	Wainwright (1–1)	Cain (0–1)		42,201	3–3
7	April 8	Reds 3:15 pm	13–4	LeCure (1–0)	Boggs (0–1)		47,345	3–4
8	April 9	Reds 7:15 pm	5–1	Lynn (1–0)	Arroyo (1–1)		37,731	4–4
9	April 10	Reds 12:45 pm	10–0	Westbrook (1–1)	Bailey (1–1)		34,882	5–4
10	April 12	Brewers 7:15 pm	2–0	Miller (2–0)	Lohse (0–1)	Boggs (2)	42,528	6–4
11	April 13	Brewers 3:15 pm	8–0	Wainwright (2–1)	Gallardo (0–1)		44,696	7–4
12	April 14	Brewers 1:15 pm	4–3 (10)	Kintzler (1–0)	Salas (0–2)	Badenhop (1)	42,645	7–5
13	April 15	@ Pirates 6:05 pm	10–6	Lynn (2–0)	McDonald (1–2)		10,539	8–5
–	April 16	@ Pirates 6:05 pm	PPD, RAIN; rescheduled for July 30					
14	April 17	@ Pirates 6:05 pm	5–0	Burnett (1–2)	Miller (2–1)		9,570	8–6
15	April 18	@ Phillies 6:05 pm	4–3	Wainwright (3–1)	Adams (0–1)	Mujica (1)	34,256	9–6
16	April 19	@ Phillies 6:05 pm	8–2 (6.5)	Halladay (2–2)	García (1–1)		34,092	9–7
17	April 20	@ Phillies 6:05 pm	5–0	Lynn (3–0)	Lee (2–1)		41,050	10–7
18	April 21	@ Phillies 7:05 pm (ESPN)	7–3	Adams (1–1)	Boggs (0–2)		35,115	10–8
19	April 22	@ Nationals 6:05 pm	3–2	Miller (3–1)	Haren (1–3)	Mujica (2)	27,263	11–8
20	April 23	@ Nationals 6:05 pm	2–0	Wainwright (4–1)	Detwiler (1–1)	Mujica (3)	29,986	12–8
21	April 24	@ Nationals 12:05 pm	4–2	García (2–1)	Strasburg (1–4)	Mujica (4)	33,694	13–8
22	April 26	Pirates 7:15 pm	9–1	Lynn (4–0)	Sánchez (0–3)		44,090	14–8
23	April 27	Pirates 3:15 pm	5–3	Burnett (2–2)	Kelly (0–1)	Grilli (10)	40,909	14–9
24	April 28	Pirates 1:15 pm	9–0	Locke (3–1)	Miller (3–2)		41,470	14–10
25	April 29	Reds 7:15 pm	2–1	Latos (2–0)	Wainwright (4–2)	Chapman (6)	36,681	14–11
26	April 30	Reds 7:15 pm	2–1	García (3–1)	Arroyo (2–3)	Mujica (5)	37,535	15–11

May (20–7) (.741)

#	Date	Opponent / Time	Score	Win	Loss	Save	Attendance	Record
27	May 1	Reds 12:45 pm	4–2	Lynn (5–0)	Bailey (1–3)	Mujica (6)	39,821	16–11
28	May 2	@ Brewers 7:10 pm	6–5	Westbrook (2–1)	Peralta (2–2)	Mujica (7)	22,204	17–11
29	May 3	@ Brewers 7:10 pm	6–1	Miller (4–2)	Lohse (1–3)		40,068	18–11
30	May 4	@ Brewers 3:05 pm (Fox)	7–6	Maness (1–0)	Henderson (2–1)	Mujica (8)	36,156	19–11
31	May 5	@ Brewers 1:10 pm	10–1	García (4–1)	Estrada (2–2)		38,620	20–11
32	May 7	@ Cubs 7:05 pm	2–1	Wood (3–2)	Lynn (5–1)	Gregg (5)	30,161	20–12
33	May 8	@ Cubs 1:20 pm	5–4	Maness (2–0)	Bowden (1–2)	Mujica (9)	26,354	21–12
34	May 10	Rockies 7:15 pm	3–0	Miller (5–2)	Garland (3–3)		37,800	22–12
35	May 11	Rockies 1:15 pm	3–0	Wainwright (5–2)	Chacín (3–2)		43,050	23–12
36	May 12	Rockies 1:15 pm	8–2	de la Rosa (4–3)	García (4–2)		40,881	23–13
37	May 13	Mets 6:05 pm (ESPN)	6–3	Lynn (6–1)	Rice (1–3)	Mujica (10)	38,412	24–13
38	May 14	Mets 7:15 pm	10–4	Gast (1–0)	Gee (2–5)		37,460	25–13
39	May 15	Mets 7:15 pm	4–2	Maness (3–0)	Marcum (0–4)	Mujica (11)	38,143	26–13
40	May 16	Mets 12:45 pm	5–2	Niese (3–4)	Wainwright (5–3)	Parnell (4)	44,068	26–14
41	May 17	Brewers 7:15 pm	7–6	García (5–2)	Peralta (3–4)	Mujica (12)	39,426	27–14
42	May 18	Brewers 6:15 pm	6–4 (10)	Axford (1–3)	Kelly (0–2)	Henderson (8)	42,410	27–15
43	May 19	Brewers 1:15 pm	4–2	Gast (2–0)	Lohse (1–5)	Mujica (13)	39,878	28–15
44	May 20	@ Padres 9:10 pm	4–2	Marquis (6–2)	Miller (5–3)	Street (11)	18,763	28–16
45	May 21	@ Padres 9:10 pm	10–2	Wainwright (6–3)	Vólquez (3–5)		18,702	29–16
46	May 22	@ Padres 9:10 pm	5–3	Lyons (1–0)	Smith (0–1)		18,683	30–16
47	May 24	@ Dodgers 9:10 pm	7–0	Lynn (7–1)	Capuano (1–3)		45,134	31–16
48	May 25	@ Dodgers 6:15 pm (Fox)	5–3	Rodriguez (1–2)	Maness (3–1)	League (10)	49,368	31–17
49	May 26	@ Dodgers 3:10 pm	5–3	Maness (4–1)	Kershaw (5–3)	Mujica (14)	43,244	32–17
50	May 27	@ Royals 1:10 pm	6–3	Wainwright (7–3)	Shields (2–6)	Mujica (15)	34,746	33–17
51	May 28	@ Royals 7:10 pm	4–1	Lyons (2–0)	Santana (3–5)	Mujica (16)	27,823	34–17
52	May 29	Royals 7:15 pm	5–3	Choate (1–0)	Crow (0–1)	Mujica (17)	43,477	35–17
53	May 30	Royals 7:15 pm	4–2	Coleman (1–0)	Boggs (0–3)	Holland (8)	43,916	35–18
–	May 31	Giants 7:15 pm	PPD, RAIN; rescheduled for June 1					

June (14–14) (.500)

#	Date	Opponent / Time	Score	Win	Loss	Save	Attendance	Record
54	June 1	Giants 12:15 pm	8–0	Miller (6–3)	Cain (4–3)		42,359	36–18
55	June 1	Giants 6:15 pm (Fox)	7–1	Wainwright (8–3)	Bumgarner (4–4)		42,175	37–18
56	June 2	Giants 1:15 pm	4–2	Gaudin (1–1)	Lyons (2–1)	Romo (15)	43,817	37–19
57	June 3	Diamondbacks 7:15 pm	7–1	Lynn (8–1)	Cahill (3–6)		38,042	38–19
58	June 4	Diamondbacks 7:15 pm	7–6 (14)	Collmenter (2–0)	Marte (0–1)	Bell (10)	39,222	38–20
59	June 5	Diamondbacks 7:15 pm	10–3	Miley (4–5)	Kelly (0–3)		40,792	38–21
60	June 6	Diamondbacks 6:15 pm	12–8	Miller (7–3)	Kennedy (3–4)	Mujica (18)	43,798	39–21
61	June 7	@ Reds 6:10 pm	9–2	Wainwright (9–3)	Leake (5–3)		38,874	40–21
62	June 8	@ Reds 6:15 pm (Fox)	4–2	Latos (6–0)	Lyons (2–2)	Chapman (16)	40,740	40–22
63	June 9	@ Reds 7:10 pm (ESPN)	11–4 (10)	Rosenthal (1–0)	Hoover (0–5)		38,023	41–22
64	June 11	@ Mets 6:10 pm	9–2	Wacha (1–0)	Hefner (1–6)		21,581	42–22
65	June 12	@ Mets 6:10 pm	5–1	Gee (5–6)	Miller (7–4)		23,331	42–23
66	June 13	@ Mets 12:10 pm	2–1	Wainwright (10–3)	Harvey (5–1)	Mujica (19)	25,471	43–23
67	June 14	@ Marlins 6:10 pm	5–4	Fernandez (4–3)	Westbrook (2–2)	Cishek (8)	15,403	43–24
68	June 15	@ Marlins 3:10 pm	13–7	Lynn (9–1)	Koehler (0–5)		16,098	44–24
69	June 16	@ Marlins 12:10 pm	7–2	Nolasco (4–7)	Lyons (2–3)	Cishek (9)	18,468	44–25
70	June 17	Cubs 6:05 pm (ESPN)	5–2	Miller (8–4)	Wood (5–6)	Mujica (20)	44,172	45–25
71	June 18	Cubs 7:15 pm	4–2	Samardzija (4–7)	Wainwright (10–4)	Gregg (10)	44,139	45–26
72	June 19	Cubs 7:15 pm	4–1	Westbrook (3–2)	Jackson (3–9)	Mujica (21)	43,878	46–26
73	June 20	Cubs 7:15 pm	6–1	Lynn (10–1)	Feldman (6–6)		43,651	47–26
74	June 21	Rangers 7:15 pm	6–4	Cotts (4–1)	Rosenthal (1–1)	Nathan (23)	45,228	47–27
75	June 22	Rangers 6:15 pm (Fox)	4–2	Pérez (1–1)	Miller (8–5)	Nathan (24)	44,651	47–28
76	June 23	Rangers 7:05 pm (ESPN)	2–1	Ross (4–1)	Wainwright (10–5)	Nathan (25)	44,063	47–29
77	June 25	@ Astros 7:10 pm	13–5	Westbrook (4–2)	Harrell (5–8)		19,271	48–29
78	June 26	@ Astros 7:10 pm	4–3	Bedard (3–3)	Lynn (10–2)	Veras (16)	17,428	48–30
79	June 28	@ Athletics 9:05 pm	6–1	Colón (11–2)	Miller (8–6)		24,208	48–31
80	June 29	@ Athletics 3:05 pm	7–1	Wainwright (11–5)	Chavez (1–2)		35,067	49–31
81	June 30	@ Athletics 3:05 pm	7–5	Milone (7–7)	Westbrook (4–3)	Balfour (19)	20,673	49–32

July (13–12) (.520)

#	Date	Opponent / Time	Score	Win	Loss	Save	Attendance	Record
82	July 2	@ Angels 9:05 pm	5–1	Weaver (2–4)	Lynn (10–3)		39,455	49–33
83	July 3	@ Angels 9:05 pm	12–2	Miller (9–6)	Williams (5–4)		35,025	50–33
84	July 4	@ Angels 8:05 pm	6–5	Downs (2–2)	Mujica (0–1)		42,707	50–34
85	July 5	Marlins 7:15 pm	4–1	Westbrook (5–3)	Turner (2–1)	Mujica (22)	46,177	51–34
86	July 6	Marlins 1:15 pm	5–4	Mujica (1–1)	Ramos (3–3)		45,475	52–34
87	July 7	Marlins 1:15 pm	3–2	Lynn (11–3)	Fernández (5–5)	Mujica (23)	43,741	53–34
88	July 9	Astros 7:15 pm	9–5	Wainwright (12–5)	Norris (6–8)	Mujica (24)	43,836	54–34
89	July 10	Astros 7:15 pm	5–4	Maness (5–1)	Wright (0–3)	Mujica (25)	44,313	55–34
90	July 11	@ Cubs 7:05 pm	3–0	Jackson (6–10)	Westbrook (5–4)	Gregg (16)	35,379	55–35
91	July 12	@ Cubs 3:05 pm	3–2	Kelly (1–3)	Villanueva (2–5)	Mujica (26)	37,322	56–35
92	July 13	@ Cubs 6:15 pm (Fox)	6–4	Garza (6–1)	Lynn (11–4)	Gregg (17)	42,240	56–36
93	July 14	@ Cubs 7:05 pm (ESPN)	10–6	Mujica (2–1)	Gregg (2–2)		35,178	57–36
–	July 16	84th All-Star Game	National League 0, American League 3 (New York; Citi Field) on Fox Sports					
94	July 19	Padres 7:15 pm	9–6	Westbrook (6–4)	Marquis (9–5)	Mujica (27)	43,929	58–36
95	July 20	Padres 6:15 pm	5–3	Vólquez (7–8)	Lynn (11–5)	Street (16)	45,288	58–37
96	July 21	Padres 1:15 pm	3–2	Wainwright (13–5)	Stults (8–8)	Mujica (28)	44,033	59–37
97	July 23	Phillies 7:15 pm	4–1	Miller (10–6)	Pettibone (5–4)	Mujica (29)	44,780	60–37
98	July 24	Phillies 7:15 pm	11–3	Westbrook (7–4)	Lannan (2–4)		44,317	61–37
99	July 25	Phillies 6:15 pm	3–1	Lynn (12–5)	Kendrick (9–7)	Mujica (30)	45,567	62–37
100	July 26	@ Braves 6:30 pm	4–1	Minor (10–5)	Wainwright (13–6)	Kimbrel (29)	50,124	62–38
101	July 27	@ Braves 2:05 pm (Fox)	2–0	Avilán (3–0)	Choate (1–1)	Kimbrel (30)	48,312	62–39
102	July 28	@ Braves 7:05 pm (ESPN)	5–2	Medlen (7–10)	Miller (10–7)	Kimbrel (31)	34,478	62–40
103	July 29	@ Pirates 6:05 pm	9–2	Liriano (11–4)	Westbrook (7–5)		32,084	62–41
104	July 30	@ Pirates 3:05 pm	2–1 (11)	Mazzaro (6–2)	Siegrist (0–1)		---	62–42
105	July 30	@ Pirates 6:05 pm	6–0	Cumpton (1–1)	Lyons (2–4)		33,861	62–43
106	July 31	@ Pirates 6:05 pm	5–4	Watson (3–1)	Rosenthal (1–2)	Melancon (5)	31,679	62–44

August (16–13) (.552)

#	Date	Opponent / Time	Score	Win	Loss	Save	Attendance	Record
107	August 1	@ Pirates 6:05 pm	13–0	Kelly (2–3)	Morton (3–3)		31,999	63–44
108	August 2	@ Reds 6:10 pm	13–3	Miller (11–7)	Arroyo (9–9)		39,095	64–44
109	August 3	@ Reds 6:10 pm	8–3	Cingrani (5–1)	Westbrook (7–6)		41,598	64–45
110	August 4	@ Reds 12:10 pm	15–2	Lynn (13–5)	Leake (10–5)		39,618	65–45
111	August 5	Dodgers 6:15 pm	3–2	Greinke (9–3)	Wainwright (13–7)	Rodriguez (2)	42,464	65–46
112	August 6	Dodgers 7:15 pm	5–1	Kelly (3–3)	Kershaw (10–7)		41,770	66–46
113	August 7	Dodgers 7:15 pm	13–4	Nolasco (8–9)	Westbrook (7–7)		43,523	66–47
114	August 8	Dodgers 7:15 pm	5–1	Ryu (11–3)	Martinez (0–1)		42,567	66–48
115	August 9	Cubs 7:15 pm	3–0	Rusin (2–1)	Lynn (13–6)	Gregg (24)	42,664	66–49
116	August 10	Cubs 6:15 pm	6–5	Parker (1–1)	Rosenthal (1–3)	Gregg (25)	43,908	66–50
117	August 11	Cubs 1:15 pm	8–4	Choate (2–1)	Parker (1–2)	Mujica (31)	43,240	67–50
118	August 13	Pirates 7:15 pm	4–3 (14)	Freeman (1–0)	Hughes (2–3)		40,243	68–50
119	August 14	Pirates 7:15 pm	5–1	Liriano (13–5)	Miller (11–8)		40,644	68–51
120	August 15	Pirates 12:45 pm	6–5 (12)	Siegrist (1–1)	Morris (5–6)		41,502	69–51
121	August 16	@ Cubs 3:05 pm	7–0	Arrieta (2–2)	Westbrook (7–8)		35,258	69–52
122	August 17	@ Cubs 3:05 pm (Fox)	4–0	Kelly (4–3)	Wood (7–10)		41,981	70–52
123	August 18	@ Cubs 1:20 pm	6–1	Wainwright (14–7)	Jackson (7–13)		33,830	71–52
124	August 19	@ Brewers 7:10 pm	8–5	Wacha (2–0)	Kintzler (3–1)	Mujica (32)	32,972	72–52
125	August 20	@ Brewers 7:10 pm	6–3	Lohse (9–8)	Lynn (13–7)	Henderson (19)	38,093	72–53
126	August 21	@ Brewers 1:10 pm	8–6	Siegrist (2–1)	Gorzelanny (3–5)	Mujica (33)	37,028	73–53
127	August 22	Braves 7:15 pm	6–2	Kelly (5–3)	Maholm (9–10)		37,363	74–53
128	August 23	Braves 7:15 pm	3–1	Wainwright (15–7)	Medlen (10–12)		41,134	75–53
129	August 24	Braves 6:15 pm	6–2	Miller (12–8)	Teherán (10–7)	Mujica (34)	43,633	76–53
130	August 25	Braves 1:15 pm (TBS)	5–2	Minor (13–5)	Lynn (13–8)	Kimbrel (41)	44,009	76–54
131	August 26	Reds 6:05 pm (ESPN)	8–6	Martinez (1–1)	Parra (1–3)	Mujica (35)	35,159	77–54
132	August 27	Reds 7:15 pm	6–1	Kelly (6–3)	Latos (13–5)		35,201	78–54
133	August 28	Reds 7:15 pm	10–0	Bailey (9–10)	Wainwright (15–8)		35,698	78–55
134	August 30	@ Pirates 6:05 pm	5–0	Liriano (15–6)	Miller (12–9)		38,026	78–56
135	August 31	@ Pirates 6:05 pm	7–1	Burnett (7–9)	Lynn (13–9)		39,514	78–57

September (19–8) (.704)

#	Date	Opponent / Time	Score	Win	Loss	Save	Attendance	Record
136	September 1	@ Pirates 12:35 pm	7–2	Kelly (7–3)	Johnson (0–2)		37,912	79–57
137	September 2	@ Reds 12:10 pm	7–2	Latos (14–5)	Wainwright (15–9)		32,951	79–58
138	September 3	@ Reds 6:10 pm	1–0	Bailey (10–10)	Maness (5–2)	Chapman (34)	20,219	79–59
139	September 4	@ Reds 6:10 pm	5–4 (16)	Martinez (2–1)	Ondrusek (3–1)		23,894	80–59
140	September 5	@ Reds 6:10 pm	6–2	Cingrani (7–3)	Lynn (13–10)		21,418	80–60
141	September 6	Pirates 7:15 pm	12–8	Kelly (8–3)	Burnett (7–10)	Mujica (36)	40,608	81–60
142	September 7	Pirates 6:15 pm	5–0	Wainwright (16–9)	Locke (9–5)		45,110	82–60
143	September 8	Pirates 1:15 pm	9–2	Wacha (3–0)	Morton (7–4)		40,156	83–60
144	September 10	Brewers 7:15 pm	4–2	Miller (13–9)	Peralta (9–15)		35,050	84–60
145	September 11	Brewers 7:15 pm	5–1	Rosenthal (2–3)	Kintzler (3–2)		35,134	85–60
146	September 12	Brewers 7:15 pm	5–3	Thornburg (2–1)	Kelly (8–4)	Henderson (25)	35,208	85–61
147	September 13	Mariners 7:15 pm	2–1 (10)	Siegrist (3–1)	Ruffin (0–2)		40,506	86–61
148	September 14	Mariners 6:15 pm	4–1	Paxton (2–0)	Wacha (3–1)	Farquhar (14)	41,374	86–62
149	September 15	Mariners 1:15 pm	12–2	Miller (14–9)	Ramírez (5–2)		40,526	87–62
150	September 16	@ Rockies 7:40 pm	6–2	Bettis (1–3)	Rosenthal (2–4)		31,117	87–63
151	September 17	@ Rockies 7:40 pm	11–4	Kelly (9–4)	Nicasio (8–8)		27,107	88–63
152	September 18	@ Rockies 7:40 pm	4–3	Wainwright (17–9)	Chatwood (7–5)	Mujica (37)	26,955	89–63
153	September 19	@ Rockies 2:10 pm	7–6 (15)	Scahill (1–0)	Salas (0–3)		33,258	89–64
154	September 20	@ Brewers 7:10 pm	7–6 (10)	Axford (7–7)	Blazek (0–1)	Martinez (1)	37,148	90–64
155	September 21	@ Brewers 6:10 pm	7–2	Lynn (14–10)	Gallardo (11–10)		35,008	91–64
156	September 22	@ Brewers 7:05 pm (ESPN)	6–4	Peralta (11–15)	Kelly (9–5)	Henderson (26)	27,389	91–65
157	September 23	Nationals 7:15 pm	4–3	Wainwright (18–9)	Roark (7–1)	Rosenthal (1)	39,783	92–65
158	September 24	Nationals 7:15 pm	2–0	Wacha (4–1)	González (11–8)	Rosenthal (2)	38,940	93–65
159	September 25	Nationals 12:45 pm	4–1	Miller (15–9)	Zimmermann (19–9)	Rosenthal (3)	40,597	94–65
160	September 27	Cubs 7:15 pm	7–0	Lynn (15–10)	Wood (9–12)		44,030	95–65
161	September 28	Cubs 3:15 pm	6–2	Wainwright (19–9)	Jackson (8–18)		42,520	96–65
162	September 29	Cubs 1:15 pm	4–0	Kelly (10–5)	Samardzija (8–13)		44,808	97–65

=== Roster ===
2013 St. Louis Cardinals
Roster
Pitchers: 34 John Axford; 67 Michael Blazek; 41 Mitchell Boggs; 65 Keith Butler; 36 Randy Choate; 63 Maikel Cleto; 71 Sam Freeman; 54 Jaime García; 64 John Gast; 58 Joe Kelly; 31 Lance Lynn; 70 Tyler Lyons; 61 Seth Maness; 66 Víctor Marte; 62 Carlos Martínez; 40 Shelby Miller; 44 Edward Mujica; 26 Trevor Rosenthal; 34 Marc Rzepczynski; 59 Fernando Salas; 46 Kevin Siegrist; 52 Michael Wacha; 50 Adam Wainwright; 35 Jake Westbrook	Catchers: 48 Tony Cruz; 32 Rob Johnson; 4 Yadier Molina; 63 Audry Pérez; Infielders: 53 Matt Adams; 13 Matt Carpenter; 21 Allen Craig; 33 Daniel Descalso; 23 David Freese; 8 Ryan Jackson; 38 Pete Kozma; 12 Ty Wigginton; 16 Kolten Wong	Outfielders: 3 Carlos Beltrán; 56 Adron Chambers; 55 Jermaine Curtis; 7 Matt Holliday; 19 Jon Jay; 41 Brock Peterson; 43 Shane Robinson	Manager: 22 Mike Matheny; Coaches: 28 Mike Aldrete (bench); 49 Blaise Ilsley (bullpen); 27 Derek Lilliquist (pitching); 47 John Mabry (hitting); 37 Chris Maloney (first base); 18 Bengie Molina (assistant hitting); 11 José Oquendo (third base); -- Gaylen Pitts (special assistant); 39 Jamie Pogue (bullpen catcher)

=== Injury report ===
Name	Position	Date of injury/move (retro date)	Nature of Injury	Date of return to play Anticipated date (in italics)	DL Stay Length	Ref
Chris Carpenter	RHP	February 5	Arm numbness	Indefinite	60-day	
Rafael Furcal	SS	March 3	Torn elbow ligament	2014	15-day	
Jason Motte	RHP	March 23	Right elbow ligament tear	2014	15-day	
David Freese	3B	March 22	Back tightness	April 8	15-day	
Matt Adams	1B	April 26 (Apr. 22)	Right oblique strain	May 7	15-day	
Rafael Furcal	SS	May 3 (March 3)	Torn elbow ligament	2014	60-day	
Jake Westbrook	RHP	May 12 (May 9)	Elbow inflammation	June 14 / May 24	15-day	
Jason Motte	RHP	May 12 (Mar 23)	Right elbow ligament tear	2014	60-day	
Jaime García	RHP	May 18	Left shoulder strain	2014	60-day	
Fernando Salas	RHP	May 22 (May 21)	Right shoulder inflammation	June 5	15-day	
John Gast	LHP	May 26	Left shoulder strain	Sep 30 / June 10	15-day	
Óscar Taveras (not on roster)	OF	May 29	Ankle sprain	June 5	7-day	
Matt Holliday	LF	July 20 (July 12)	Right hamstring sprain	July 27	15-day	
Yadier Molina	C	July 31	Right knee sprain	August 15	15-day	
Shane Robinson	OF	July 31	Right shoulder strain	August 15	15-day	
Tyrell Jenkins (not on roster, #7)	RHP	August 6	Right shoulder lat muscle	2014	Season	
Óscar Taveras (not on roster, #1)	OF	August 21	Ankle sprain	2014	Season	
Tony Cruz	C	August 15	Left forearm fracture	September 1 / August 30	15-day	
Jake Westbrook	RHP	August 23 (Aug. 22)	Lower back strain	September 6 / September 6	15-day	
Allen Craig	1B/OF	September 4	Left foot Lisfranc injury	October 23	n/a	

Injury Report

=== In-season acquisitions and roster moves ===
==== April ====
- April 8: Optioned 2B Ryan Jackson to AAA Memphis.
- April 26: Purchased the contract of 3B Jermaine Curtis from Memphis.
- April 29: Optioned LHP Mark Rzepczynski to Memphis and purchased the contract of RHP Seth Maness.

==== May ====
- May 3: Transferred Rafael Furcal to the 60-day DL.
- May 3: Optioned RHP Mitchell Boggs to Memphis and purchased the contract of RHP Carlos Martínez, (the #2 prospect).
- May 7: Optioned Curtis back to Memphis when the team activated first baseman Matt Adams from the 15-day DL.
- May 12: Transferred Motte to the 60-day DL.
- May 12: Placed RHP Jake Westbrook on the 15-day DL and purchased the contract of LHP John Gast, (the #8 prospect), from Memphis.
- May 18: Recalled Boggs from Memphis and placed Jaime García on the 15-day DL.
- May 19: Purchased the contract of LHP Tyler Lyons from Memphis.
- May 21: The Chicago Cubs claimed RHP Eduárdo Sanchéz off-waivers.
- May 22: Activated Lyons after placing Salas on 15-day DL.
- May 26: Recalled RHP Michael Blazek, (the #9 prospect), after placing Gast on the 15-day DL.
- May 27: Recalled RHP Víctor Marte after sending Martínez back to Memphis.
- May 29: Placed Óscar Taveras, (the #1 prospect, not on roster), on 7-day DL.
- May 30: Purchased the contract of RHP Michael Wacha, (the #4 prospect), from Memphis.
- May 30: Activated Wacha after transferring García to the 60-day DL and demoting Blazek to Memphis.
- May 31: Recalled RHP Keith Butler after demoting Boggs to Memphis for the second time.

==== June ====
- June 5: Recalled RHP Maikel Cleto after demoting Víctor Marte to Memphis.
- June 6: Recalled LHP Siegrist after demoting Cleto..
- June 14: Activated RHP Westbrook from the DL after demoting Wacha to Memphis.
- June 22: Recalled RHP Blazek after demoting Lyons to Memphis.
- June 23: The Kansas City Royals claimed Cleto off waivers.

==== July ====
- July 9: Purchased contract of C Rob Johnson after giving INF Ty Wigginton his unconditional release.
- July 9: Sold the contract of Mitchell Boggs to the Colorado Rockies for $206,400 in international signing bonus money.
- July 11: Recalled RHP Carlos Martínez and optioned RHP Michael Blazek to Memphis.
- July 20: Purchased contract of 1B Brock Peterson and placed OF Matt Holliday on 15-day DL.
- July 25: Recalled LHP Marc Rzepczynski after Carlos Martinez optioned to AAA-Memphis.
- July 27: Activated Matt Holliday and optioned Brock Peterson to Memphis.
- July 30: Recalled RHPs Blazek, Butler and LHP Lyons for one day after optioning Rzepczynski and Salas.
- July 30: Traded LHP Marc Rzepczynski to the Cleveland Indians for SS Juan Herrera.
- July 31: Recalled 1B Brock Peterson and OF Adron Chambers and placed C Yadier Molina and OF Shane Robinson on the 15-day DL.

==== August ====
- August 9: Recalled RHP Michael Wacha after optioning RHP Carlos Martínez.
- August 16: Brought up from AAA-Memphis #4 prospect, 2B Kolten Wong after optioning OF Adron Chambers.
- August 17: Recalled LHP Tyler Lyons after optioning LHP Sam Freeman.
- August 23: Recalled RHP Carlos Martínez after placing Jake Westbrook on 15-day DL.
- August 27: Recalled RHP Fernando Salas after optioning LHP Tyler Lyons to Memphis.
- August 28: Recalled RHP Michael Blazek after optioning RHP Carlos Martínez.
- August 29: Recalled LHP Sam Freeman after optioning RHP Michael Wacha to Springfield and RHP Michael Blazek to Memphis.
- August 30: Acquired RHP John Axford (closer) from the Milwaukee Brewers, in exchange for a player to be named later (Michael Blazek on September 1).

==== September ====
- September 1: Recalled and placed OF Adron Chambers on the expanded 40-man roster.

==== October ====
- October 23: Added Allen Craig to the postseason roster for the World Series roster and removed Chambers.

== Regular season statistics ==
Note: All statistics final through September 29, 2013

=== Composite scoring by inning ===
INNING	1	2	3	4	5	6	7	8	9	10	11	12	13	14	15	16	TOTAL
CARDINALS	99	66	103	110	90	107	90	69	35	9	0	2	0	2	0	1	783
OPPONENTS	80	84	52	60	57	63	66	59	66	3	1	1	0	2	1	1	596

=== Batters ===
- Statistics notes: POS = Position; G = Games played; AB = At bats; R = Runs; H = Hits; 2B = Doubles; HR = Home runs; RBI = Runs batted in; BB = Base on balls; SO = Strikeouts; GIDP = Grounded into double plays; AVG = Batting average; OBP = On-base percentage; SLG = Slugging percentage; OPS = On-base plus slugging
- Table notes:

Table half above double line: Appeared in most games at that position
Below double line: Ranked by ABs regardless of position
Includes all player at-bats during season, excluding pitchers batting

- Bold: led or tied for lead in the National League (NL)
- [§]: Major league-leader or tied for lead
- [*]: Top-ten finisher in NL, but not league-leader
- **Bold** (non-italicized): led or tied for team lead

=Team leader (To be reflected at All-Star break)

-->

Player	POS	G	AB	R	H	2B	HR	RBI	BB	SO	GIDP	Avg.	OBP	SLG	OPS
Yadier Molina	C	136	505	68	161	44*	12	80	30	55	14	**.319***	.359	.477	.836
Allen Craig	1B	134	508	71	160	29	13	**97***	40	100	12	.315*	.373	.457	.830
Matt Carpenter	2B	**157***	**626***	**126^{§}**	**199^{§}**	**55^{§}**	11	78	**72***	98	4	.318*	**.392***	.481	.873
Pete Kozma	SS	143	410	44	89	20	1	35	34	91	6	.218	.274	.273	.547
David Freese	3B	138	462	53	121	26	9	60	47	**106**	25*	.262	.340	.381	.721
Matt Holliday	LF	141	520	103*	156	31	22	94*	69	86	**31***	.300	.389*	.490	**.879***
Jon Jay	CF	**157***	548	75	151	27	7	67	52	103	13	.276	.351	.370	.721
Carlos Beltrán	RF	145	554	79	164	30	**24**	84	38	90	12	.296	.339	**.491**	.830
Daniel Descalso	IF	123	328	43	78	25	5	43	22	56	7	.238	.290	.366	.656
Matt Adams	1B	108	296	46	84	14	17	51	23	80	9	.284	.335	.503	.839
Shane Robinson	OF	99	144	22	36	2	2	16	23	17	2	.250	.345	.319	.664
Tony Cruz	C	51	123	13	25	6	1	13	4	25	7	.203	.240	.293	.533
Kolten Wong	2B	32	59	6	9	1	0	0	3	12	2	.153	.194	.169	.363
Ty Wigginton	UT	47	57	9	9	2	0	3	5	19	1	.158	.238	.193	.431
Rob Johnson	C	20	35	2	6	1	0	2	3	6	2	.171	.237	.257	.494
Adron Chambers	OF	25	26	5	4	1	0	1	3	11	0	.154	.241	.192	.434
Brock Peterson	UT	23	26	0	2	0	0	2	2	11	0	.077	.143	.077	.220
Ryan Jackson	IF	7	7	0	0	0	0	0	0	2	0	.000	.000	.000	.000
Jermaine Curtis	LF	5	3	0	0	0	0	0	1	1	0	.000	.400	.000	.400
Audry Pérez	C	2	1	0	0	0	0	0	0	1	0	.000	.000	.000	.000
Pitcher Totals	---	162	319	18	40	8	1	19	10	140	7	.125	.156	.160	.316
**Team totals**	---	**162**	**5,557**	**783**	**1,494**	**322**	**125**	**745**	**481**	**1,110**	**154**	**.269**	**.332**	**.401**	**.733**
NL Rank of 15	---	---	4	**1**	2	**1**	13	**1**	5	14	2	2	**1**	3	2 HALF-WAY, 81 G | **Team totals** (6/30) || --- || **81** || **2,784** || **401** || **763** || **148** || **74** || **382** || **231** || **558** || **81** || **.274** || **.334** || **.413** || **.747**
NL Rank of 15 (6/30)	---	---	7	**1**	2	5	11	**1**	7	12	**1**	**1**	**1**	2	2 -->

Cardinals Batting statistics, by BA | NL Batting Leaders, by BA | Cardinals, sorted by AB | NL Batting Statistics by Team | Baseball Reference – 2013 St. Louis Cardinals

=== Pitchers ===
- Statistics notes: GP = Games pitched; GS = Games started; IP = Innings pitched; W = Wins; L = Losses; ERA = Earned run average; H = Hits allowed; HR = Home runs allowed; BB = Walks allowed; SO = Strikeouts; WHIP = Walks plus hits per inning pitched; HBP = Hit by pitch; BF = Batters faced; O-AVG = Opponent batting avg.; O-OBP = Opponent on-base avg.; O-SLG = Opponent slugging pct.;; CG = Complete games; ShO = Shutouts; SV = Save; HLD = Hold; R suppt = Run support average from his team's batters per game started
- Includes all pitchers for season
- Bold: led or tied for lead in the National League (NL)
- [§]: Major league-leader or tied for lead
- [*]: Top-ten finisher in NL, but not league-leader
- **Bold** (non-itlalicized): led or tied for team lead

Pitcher	GP	GS	IP	W	L	ERA	H	HR	BB	SO	WHIP	HBP	BF	O-Avg	O-Obp	O-Slg	SV	HLD	R-supptGS IP W L ERA H HR BB SO WHIP HBP BF O-AVG O-OBP O-SLG R support avg bgcolor="gold"| for leader in category -->
Adam Wainwright (**5 CG^{§}**/**2 ShO**)	34	**34**^{§}	**241.2^{§}**	**19**	9	**2.94***	**223**	15	35	**219***	**1.07***	6	**956^{§}**	.248	**.280***	**.356**	---	---	4.6
Lance Lynn	33	33*	201.2	15*	**10**	3.97	189	14	**76***	198*	1.31	**11***	856	.252	.327	.374	---	---	5.2
Shelby Miller (1 CG/ShO*)	31	31	173.1	15*	9	3.06*	152	**20**	57	169	1.21	5	722	**.234**	.299	.371	---	---	4.7
Joe Kelly	37	15	124.0	10	5	2.69	124	10	44	79	1.36	5	532	.259	.326	.367	0	2	6.0
Jake Westbrook (1 CG/ShO*)	21	19	116.2	7	7	4.63	132	7	50	44	1.56	10	523	.293	.373	.401	---	---	4.9
Trevor Rosenthal	**74***	0	75.1	2	4	2.63	63	4	20	108	1.10	6	311	.223	.289	.319	3	**29***	–
Michael Wacha	15	9	64.2	4	1	2.78	52	5	19	65	1.10	0	260	.219	.274	.329	---	---	4.4
Edward Mujica	65	0	64.2	2	1	2.78	60	9	5	46	1.01	1	255	.245	.262	.412	**37***	5	–
Seth Maness	66	0	62.0	5	2	2.32	65	4	13	35	1.26	1	249	.281	.322	.403	1	15	–
Jaime García	9	9	55.1	5	2	3.58	57	6	15	43	1.30	0	234	.263	.310	.415	---	---	4.4
Tyler Lyons	12	8	53.0	2	4	4.95	49	5	16	43	1.23	3	223	.241	.306	.419	0	0	3.4
Kevin Siegrist	45	0	39.2	3	1	0.45	17	1	18	50	0.88	1	152	.128	.237	.195	0	11	–
Randy Choate	64	0	35.1	2	1	2.29	26	0	11	28	1.05	1	160	.208	.281	.256	0	15	–
Carlos Martínez	21	1	28.1	2	1	5.08	31	1	9	24	1.41	3	124	.282	.350	.355	1	2	1.0
Fernando Salas	27	0	28.0	0	3	4.50	27	3	6	22	1.18	1	118	.255	.291	.425	0	2	–
Keith Butler	16	0	20.0	0	0	4.05	13	0	11	16	1.20	1	85	.255	.294	.278	0	0	–
Mitchell Boggs	18	0	14.2	0	3	11.05	21	3	15	11	2.46	2	82	.339	.475	.532	2	0	–
John Gast	3	3	12.1	2	0	5.11	11	1	5	8	1.30	0	52	.234	.308	.340	---	---	6.1
Sam Freeman	13	0	12.1	1	0	2.19	8	0	5	8	1.05	0	50	.182	.265	.250	0	1	–
John Axford	13	0	10.1	1	0	1.74	11	0	3	11	1.36	1	44	.282	.349	.333	0	0	–
Michael Blazek	11	0	10.1	0	0	6.97	10	2	10	10	1.94	1	52	.244	.404	.415	0	0	–
Marc Rzepczynski	11	0	10.1	0	0	7.84	16	1	4	9	1.94	1	50	.364	.420	.500	0	0	–
Victor Marte	4	0	3.0	0	1	6.00	4	0	3	2	2.33	1	17	.308	.471	.385	0	0	–
Maikel Cleto	0	0	2.1	0	0	19.29	5	1	1	5	2.57	2	15	.417	.533	.667	0	0	–
Rob Johnson	0	0	0.1	0	0	0.00	0	0	0	1	0.00	0	1	.000	.000	.000	0	0	–
**Starters' totals**	**162**	**162**	**984.1**	**77**	**46**	**3.38**	**922**	**76**	**303**	**806**	**1.24**	**36**	**4,105**	**.249**	**.310**	**.370**	–	–	**4.8**
**Relievers' totals**	**155**	–	**475.1**	**20**	**19**	**3.45**	**442**	**36**	**148**	**448**	**1.24**	**28**	**1,999**	**.247**	**.312**	**.363**	**44**	**83**	–
**Team totals**	**162**	**162**	**1,459.2**	**97**	**65**	**3.43**	**1,366**	**112**	**451**	**1,254**	**1.25**	**64**	**6,104**	**.249**	**.311**	**.368**	**44**	**83**	**4.8**

Other starters' statistics; CG: 7, ShO: 4.
Other relief pitching statistics: 44/64 Sv/opp (69%); 335/483 first batters retired (70%); 60/267 inherited runners scored (22%).

Team pitching statistics | Individual pitching statistics | Sortable Team pitching Statistics | Cardinals Pitchers | NL Team Pitching

=== Fielding ===
Games played	Innings	TC	PO	A	E	DP	Field Pct.	DER
**162**	**13,137.0**	**6,172**	**4,379**	**1,718**	**75**	**177**	**.988**	**.692**

NL Team Fielding

=== Cardinals Record When ===
Situation	W-L Record	Pct.	Situation	W-L Record	Pct.
**Home**	54–27	.667	Extra innings	6–6	.500
**Away**	43–38	.531	Shutouts	15–11	.577
**Scoring first**	73–24	.753	Out-hit opponents	74–8	.902
**Opponent scores first**	24–41	.369	Out-hit by opponents	16–51	.239
**Scoring more than 3 runs**	83–14	.856	Same hits as opponents	7–6	.538
**Scoring 3 runs**	8–10	.444	One-run games	20–16	.556
**Scoring fewer than 3 runs**	6–41	.128	One or Two-run games	35–32	.522
**Leading after 7 innings**	86–6	.935	Monday games	9–8	.529
**Tied after 7 innings**	7–8	.467	Tuesday games	17–8	.680
**Trailing after 7 innings**	4–51	.073	Wednesday games	16–9	.640
**Leading after 8 innings**	88–3	.967	Thursday games	9–8	.529
**Tied after 8 innings**	8–7	.533	Friday games	16–9	.640
**Trailing after 8 innings** (nc 7 inn. 4/19 loss)	1–54	.018	Saturday games	15–12	.556
**In errorless games**	67–33	.670	Sunday games	15–11	.577
**In games with errors**	30–32	.484			

=== Percentage of scoring via home runs ===
	HR	R via HR	Total R	Pct.
**Cardinals**	125	**203**	783	.259
**Opponents**	112	**176**	596	.295

== Awards and honors ==
- MLB.com Pitching Performance of the Month: Shelby Miller (May)
- National League Pitcher of the Month: Adam Wainwright (June)
- Roberto Clemente Award: Carlos Beltrán

All-Star Game selectees

- Carlos Beltrán, RF (starter)
- Matt Carpenter, 2B
- Allen Craig, 1B
- Yadier Molina, C (starter)
- Edward Mujica, P (did not pitch)
- Adam Wainwright, P (did not pitch)

Rawlings Gold Glove Award

- Adam Wainwright (Pitcher)
- Yadier Molina (Catcher)

Silver Slugger Award

- Yadier Molina (Catcher)
- Matt Carpenter (Second base)

Postseason

- Michael Wacha, NLCS MVP

The Sporting News National League All-Star team

- Yadier Molina, C
- Matt Carpenter, 2B

Baseball America All-Rookie team

- Matt Adams, 1B
- Shelby Miller, SP
- Trevor Rosenthal, RP

Award finalists notes

For the NL Most Valuable Player Award, Molina was third and Matt Carpenter fourth. Other Cardinals receiving votes for MVP included Matt Holliday, Wainwright, and Craig. Wainwright finished second to the Dodgers' Clayton Kershaw in the NL Cy Young Award award balloting. In the NL Rookie of the Year voting, Miller slotted third behind the Marlins' José Fernández and the Dodgers' Yasiel Puig. Mike Matheny placed fourth in the NL Manager of the Year award. Matt Carpenter was selected as the team finalist for Heart & Hustle Award; Boston's Dustin Pedroia was the winner. Beltrán was the Cardinals' finalist for the Marvin Miller Man of the Year Award; the New York Yankees' Mariano Rivera was declared the recipient.

== Home attendance ==
(final through September 29)

Year	Attendance (games)	AVG/game	NL Rank	W-L
2013	3,369,769 (81)	41,602	2nd of 15	54–27
2012	3,262,109 (81)	40,273	4th of 16	50–31

2013 St. Louis Cardinals
2012 St. Louis Cardinals

== Post-season ==
=== National League Division Series ===
==== Game 1, October 3 ====
5:07 p.m. (EDT) at Busch Stadium in St. Louis, Missouri

Team	1	2	3	4	5	6	7	8	9	R	H	E
Pittsburgh	0	0	0	0	1	0	0	0	0	1	4	3
St. Louis	0	0	7	0	1	1	0	0	X	9	10	0
WP: Adam Wainwright (1–0) LP: A. J. Burnett (0–1); Home runs: PIT: Pedro Álvarez (1); STL: Carlos Beltrán (1)

The Cardinals set a new NLDS record with seven runs in an inning (that record was broken the next year by the Cardinals, who scored 8 runs in the 7th inning of Game 1 of the 2014 NLDS)KMOX announcer John Rooney highlighted by Carlos Beltrán's towering three-run home run (443 feet), his 15th in post-season play tying Babe Ruth for eighth place on the list. Only Derek Jeter (20) and Albert Pujols (18) among active players have more.

==== Game 2, October 4 ====
1:07 p.m. (EDT) at Busch Stadium in St. Louis, Missouri

Team	1	2	3	4	5	6	7	8	9	R	H	E
Pittsburgh	0	1	2	0	2	0	1	1	0	7	10	0
St. Louis	0	0	0	0	1	0	0	0	0	1	4	1
WP: Gerrit Cole (1–0) LP: Lance Lynn (0–1); Home runs: PIT: Pedro Álvarez (2), Starling Marte (1); STL: Yadier Molina (1)

==== Game 3, October 6 ====
4:37 p.m. (EDT) at PNC Park in Pittsburgh, Pennsylvania

Team	1	2	3	4	5	6	7	8	9	R	H	E
St. Louis	0	0	0	0	2	0	0	1	0	3	7	1
Pittsburgh	2	0	0	0	0	1	0	2	X	5	8	0
WP: Mark Melancon (1–0) LP: Carlos Martínez (0–1) Sv: Jason Grilli (1); Home runs: STL: Carlos Beltrán (2); PIT: None

==== Game 4, October 7 ====
3:07 p.m. (EDT) at PNC Park in Pittsburgh, Pennsylvania

Team	1	2	3	4	5	6	7	8	9	R	H	E
St. Louis	0	0	0	0	0	2	0	0	0	2	3	0
Pittsburgh	0	0	0	0	0	0	0	1	0	1	1	0
WP: Michael Wacha (1–0) LP: Charlie Morton (0–1) Sv: Trevor Rosenthal (1); Home runs: STL: Matt Holliday (1); PIT: Pedro Álvarez (3)

With St. Louis just one game from elimination, rookie Michael Wacha was called upon to start the game, and he nearly duplicated his September 24 no-hit effort just two weeks earlier against the Washington Nationals by carrying a no-hitter into the eighth inning. Again, he left having given up just one hit – Pedro Alvárez broke it up in the eighth with a home run for the Pirates' lone hit and run. Two more rookies – Carlos Martínez and Trevor Rosenthal – finished the game. With this performance, Wacha delivered a postseason no-hitter deeper than any rookie in history, surpassing Jeff Tesreau's 5 1/3 innings for the 1912 New York Giants. He also became the first first-round draft pick since Barry Zito (2000) to start a postseason game less than two years after being drafted. He was acquired in the 2012 draft with the 19th overall pick from the Los Angeles Angels as compensation for losing Albert Pujols Matt Holliday provided all the runs the Cardinals needed with his two-run homer in the sixth. With the Game 4 win, the Cardinals guaranteed a Game 5, making it the third straight NLDS Game 5 in as many years. Trevor Rosenthal picked up his first career post-season save.

==== Game 5, October 9 ====
8:07 p.m. (EDT) at Busch Stadium in St. Louis, Missouri

Team	1	2	3	4	5	6	7	8	9	R	H	E
Pittsburgh	0	0	0	0	0	0	1	0	0	1	8	1
St. Louis	0	2	0	0	0	1	0	3	X	6	9	0
WP: Adam Wainwright (2–0) LP: Gerrit Cole (1–1); Home runs: PIT: None; STL: David Freese (1), Matt Adams (1)

Behind Adam Wainwright's arm, and a pair of two-run home runs by David Freese and Matt Adams, the Cardinals clinch their 8th trip to the National League Championship Series since 2000.

=== National League Championship Series ===
==== Game 1 ====
Friday, October 11, 2013 – 8:37 p.m. (EDT) at Busch Stadium in St. Louis, Missouri

Team	1	2	3	4	5	6	7	8	9	10	11	12	13	R	H	E
Los Angeles	0	0	2	0	0	0	0	0	0	0	0	0	0	2	9	0
St. Louis	0	0	2	0	0	0	0	0	0	0	0	0	1	3	7	0
WP: Lance Lynn (1–0) LP: Chris Withrow (0–1)

==== Game 2 ====
Saturday, October 12, 2013 – 4:07 p.m. (EDT) at Busch Stadium in St. Louis, Missouri

Team	1	2	3	4	5	6	7	8	9	R	H	E
Los Angeles	0	0	0	0	0	0	0	0	0	0	5	0
St. Louis	0	0	0	0	1	0	0	0	X	1	2	1
WP: Michael Wacha (1–0) LP: Clayton Kershaw (0–1) Sv: Trevor Rosenthal (1)

==== Game 3 ====
Monday, October 14, 2013 – 8:07 p.m. (EDT) at Dodger Stadium in Los Angeles

Team	1	2	3	4	5	6	7	8	9	R	H	E
St. Louis	0	0	0	0	0	0	0	0	0	0	4	0
Los Angeles	0	0	0	2	0	0	0	1	X	3	9	0
WP: Hyun-Jin Ryu (1–0) LP: Adam Wainwright (0–1) Sv: Kenley Jansen (1)

==== Game 4 ====
Tuesday, October 15, 2013 – 8:07 p.m. (EDT) at Dodger Stadium in Los Angeles

Team	1	2	3	4	5	6	7	8	9	R	H	E
St. Louis	0	0	3	0	0	0	1	0	0	4	6	0
Los Angeles	0	0	0	2	0	0	0	0	X	2	8	1
WP: Lance Lynn (2–0) LP: Ricky Nolasco (0–0) Sv: Trevor Rosenthal (2); Home runs: STL: Matt Holliday (1), Shane Robinson (1); LAD: None

==== Game 5 ====
Wednesday, October 16, 2013 – 4:07 p.m. (EDT) at Dodger Stadium in Los Angeles

Team	1	2	3	4	5	6	7	8	9	R	H	E
St. Louis	0	0	2	0	0	0	0	0	2	4	10	0
Los Angeles	0	2	1	0	1	0	1	1	X	6	9	0
WP: Zack Greinke (1–0) LP: Joe Kelly (0–1); Home runs: STL: None; LAD: Carl Crawford (1), A.J. Ellis (1), Adrián González 2 (2)

==== Game 6 ====
Friday, October 18, 2013 – 8:37 p.m. (EDT) at Busch Stadium in St. Louis, Missouri

Team	1	2	3	4	5	6	7	8	9	R	H	E
Los Angeles	0	0	0	0	0	0	0	0	0	0	2	2
St. Louis	0	0	4	0	5	0	0	0	X	9	13	0
WP: Michael Wacha (2–0) LP: Clayton Kershaw (0–2)

For the fourth time in 10 seasons, the Cardinals won the National League pennant.
Michael Wacha, 22, was named NLCS MVP. He became the youngest NLCS MVP Award winner since 21-year-old Steve Avery of the Braves in 1991, the first rookie to win a postseason series MVP Award since then-Marlins sensation Liván Hernández in the 1997 World Series, and the first rookie to start and win an NLCS clinching game since the Dodgers' Fernando Valenzuela in 1981.

==== Composite line score ====
2013 NLCS (4–2): St. Louis Cardinals over Los Angeles Dodgers

Team	1	2	3	4	5	6	7	8	9	10	11	12	13	R	H	E
Los Angeles Dodgers	0	2	3	4	1	0	1	2	0	0	0	0	0	13	40	3
St. Louis Cardinals	0	0	11	0	6	0	1	0	2	0	0	0	1	21	42	1
Total attendance: 301,577 Average attendance: 50,263

=== World Series ===
The Cardinals faced the American League champion Boston Red Sox, nine years after the two teams' last World Series meeting in 2004. Billed as a "throwback series", it was the first World Series since 1999 whose contestants finished with the best record in their respective leagues – prior to the introduction of divisional play in 1969, the top regular season records in each league qualified those teams for the World Series with no other playoff rounds.

The Red Sox led the American League in runs scored with 853 giving up 656 runs, as the Cardinals were in leading the National League with 783 runs scored, while giving up only 596 runs.

==== Game 1 ====
Wednesday, October 23, 2013 – 8:07 p.m. (EDT) at Fenway Park in Boston, Massachusetts

Team	1	2	3	4	5	6	7	8	9	R	H	E
St. Louis	0	0	0	0	0	0	0	0	1	1	7	3
Boston	3	2	0	0	0	0	2	1	x	8	8	1
WP: Jon Lester (1–0) LP: Adam Wainwright (0–1); Home runs: STL: Matt Holliday (1); BOS: David Ortiz (1)

==== Game 2 ====
Thursday, October 24, 2013 – 8:07 p.m. (EDT) at Fenway Park in Boston, Massachusetts

Team	1	2	3	4	5	6	7	8	9	R	H	E
St. Louis	0	0	0	1	0	0	3	0	0	4	7	1
Boston	0	0	0	0	0	2	0	0	0	2	4	2
WP: Michael Wacha (1–0) LP: John Lackey (0–1) Sv: Trevor Rosenthal (1); Home runs: STL: None; BOS: David Ortiz (2)

==== Game 3 ====
Saturday, October 26, 2013 – 8:07 p.m. (EDT) at Busch Stadium in St. Louis, Missouri

Team	1	2	3	4	5	6	7	8	9	R	H	E
Boston	0	0	0	0	1	1	0	2	0	4	6	2
St. Louis	2	0	0	0	0	0	2	0	1	5	12	0
WP: Trevor Rosenthal (1–0) LP: Brandon Workman (0–1)

==== Game 4 ====
Sunday, October 27, 2013 – 8:15 p.m. (EDT) at Busch Stadium in St. Louis, Missouri

Team	1	2	3	4	5	6	7	8	9	R	H	E
Boston	0	0	0	0	1	3	0	0	0	4	6	2
St. Louis	0	0	1	0	0	0	1	0	0	2	6	0
WP: Félix Doubront (1–0) LP: Lance Lynn (0–1) Sv: Koji Uehara (1); Home runs: BOS: Jonny Gomes (1); STL: None

==== Game 5 ====
Monday, October 28, 2013 – 8:07 p.m. (EDT) at Busch Stadium in St. Louis, Missouri

Team	1	2	3	4	5	6	7	8	9	R	H	E
Boston	1	0	0	0	0	0	2	0	0	3	9	0
St. Louis	0	0	0	1	0	0	0	0	0	1	4	0
WP: Jon Lester (2–0) LP: Adam Wainwright (0–2) Sv: Koji Uehara (2); Home runs: BOS: None; STL: Matt Holliday (2)

==== Game 6 ====
Wednesday, October 30, 2013 – 8:07 p.m. (EDT) at Fenway Park in Boston, Massachusetts

Team	1	2	3	4	5	6	7	8	9	R	H	E
St. Louis	0	0	0	0	0	0	1	0	0	1	9	1
Boston	0	0	3	3	0	0	0	0	X	6	8	1
WP: John Lackey (1–1) LP: Michael Wacha (1–1); Home runs: STL: None; BOS: Stephen Drew (1)

==== Composite line score ====
2013 World Series (4–2): Boston Red Sox (A.L.) vs. St. Louis Cardinals (N.L.)

Team	1	2	3	4	5	6	7	8	9	R	H	E
St. Louis Cardinals	2	0	1	2	0	0	7	0	2	14	45	5
Boston Red Sox	4	2	3	3	2	6	4	3	0	27	41	8
Home runs: STL: Matt Holliday (3); BOS: Stephen Drew (1), Jonny Gomes (1), David Ortiz (3); Total attendance: 257,565 Average attendance: 42,928; Winning player's share: $307,322.68 Losing player's share: $228,300.17

== Executives and club officials ==
- Owner, chairman and CEO: William DeWitt, Jr.
- President: William DeWitt III
- Sr. vice president and general counsel: Mike Whittle
- Sr. vice president of baseball operations / GM: John Mozeliak
- Assistant general manager: Mike Girsch
- Special assistants to the GM: Ryan Franklin, Mike Jorgensen, Cal Eldred, Red Schoendienst
- Director, player personnel: Matt Slater
- Director of major league administration: Judy Carpenter-Barada
- Director of minor league operations: John Vuch
- Baseball operations assistant, player development: Tony Ferreira
- Director, scouting: Dan Kantrovitz
- Director, international operations: Moisés Rodríguez
- Baseball operations assistant, international: Luis Morales
- Manager of baseball development: Christopher Correa
- Quantitative analyst: Matt Bayer, Dane Sorensen
- Director, media relations: Brian Bartow
- Director, public relations and civic affairs: Ron Watermon
- Senior medical advisor: Barry Weinberg
- Head league trainer: Greg Hauck
- Strength/conditioning coach: Pete Prinzi
- Equipment manager: Rip Rowan
- Traveling secretary: C.J. Cherre
- Vice president and community relations and exec. director, Cardinals Care: Michael Hall
- Vice president, event services and merchandizing: Vicki Bryant
- Sr. vice president of finance/CFO: Brad Wood
- Vice president of stadium operations: Joe Abernathy
- Sr. vice president of sales and marketing: Dan Farrell

Cardinals Front Office

== Minor leagues ==
=== Affiliations ===
2014 Minor League standings

Level	Team	League	Location	Manager	W	L	Placing	Refs
AAA	Memphis Redbirds	Pacific Coast League	Memphis, Tennessee	Ron Warner	69	75	2nd	
AA	Springfield Cardinals	Texas League	Springfield, Missouri	Mike Shildt	64	74	3rd	
Advanced A	Palm Beach Cardinals	Florida State League	Jupiter, Florida	Johnny Rodríguez	64	71	4th	
A	Peoria Chiefs	Midwest League	Peoria, Illinois	Dann Bilardello	68	69	4th	
Short Season A	State College Spikes	New York–Penn League	University Park, Pennsylvania	Oliver Mármol	48	27	1st^{†}	
Rookie	Johnson City Cardinals	Appalachian League	Johnson City, Tennessee	Joe Kruzel	36	31	4th	
Rookie	GCL Cardinals	Gulf Coast League	Jupiter, Florida	Steve Turco	24	35	3rd	
Rookie	DSL Cardinals	Dominican Summer League	Santo Domingo, DR	Fray Peniche	35	36	5th	

† – Runner up for 2013 New York–Penn League championship.

=== Organizational and prospect analyses ===
ESPN's Keith Law ranked St. Louis' minor league system tops in all of baseball in a February 2013 publication. Another publication ranked the Cardinals 7th of the 30 teams in homegrown talent. The MLB Network ranked four Cardinals' prospects in its Top 50 list for 2013 thusly: Trevor Rosenthal #43 (21st round in 2009 draft; 2.97 ERA in 109 IP in 2012), Carlos Martínez #33, Shelby Miller #25 [was #5 in 2012], and Oscar Taveras #3, in 2012 with the Springfield Cardinals (Texas League) figures and rankings: .321 BA–1st, 37 Doubles–1st, 23 Home Runs—tied 4th, 94 RBI–2nd, .953 OPS–2nd, 83 Runs–3rd. St. Louis Cardinals Farm System Affiliates
--> Baseball America ranks the Cardinals' top 10 prospects St. Louis Post-Dispatch (January 14, 2013)
, Baseball America 2013 Prospect Watch (January 16)
2013 Cardinals Prospect Watch, MLB.com
Cards organization preview, Top 20 Prospects, MLB.com (February 8, 2012)
Memphis Redbirds-AAA roster
Springfield Cardinals-AA roster

=== Draft selections ===
- St. Louis Cardinals 2013 Draft Selections

==== Players from this draft who played in the major leagues ====
2013 St. Louis Cardinals draft picks who played in the major leagues

Name	Position	Round	MLB Debut Date	Team	Opponent	Ref
Mike Mayers	RHP	3	July 24, 2016	St. Louis Cardinals	Los Angeles Dodgers	
