= Richard Castillo (baseball) =

Venezuelan baseball player

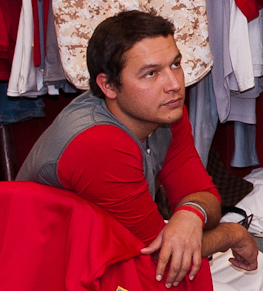
- Castillo with the Springfield Cardinals in 2011

Gary SouthShore RailCats
- Pitcher
- Born: October 11, 1989 (age 36); Barquisimeto, Venezuela
- Bats: Right Throws: Right
- Stats at Baseball Reference

Richard J. Castillo (born October 11, 1989) is a Venezuelan professional baseball pitcher who plays for the Gary SouthShore RailCats. He also played for the Spain national baseball team in the 2013 World Baseball Classic.

Castillo elected free agency from the Colorado Rockies organization on November 6, 2015.
