= Jermaine Curtis =

American baseball player (born 1987)

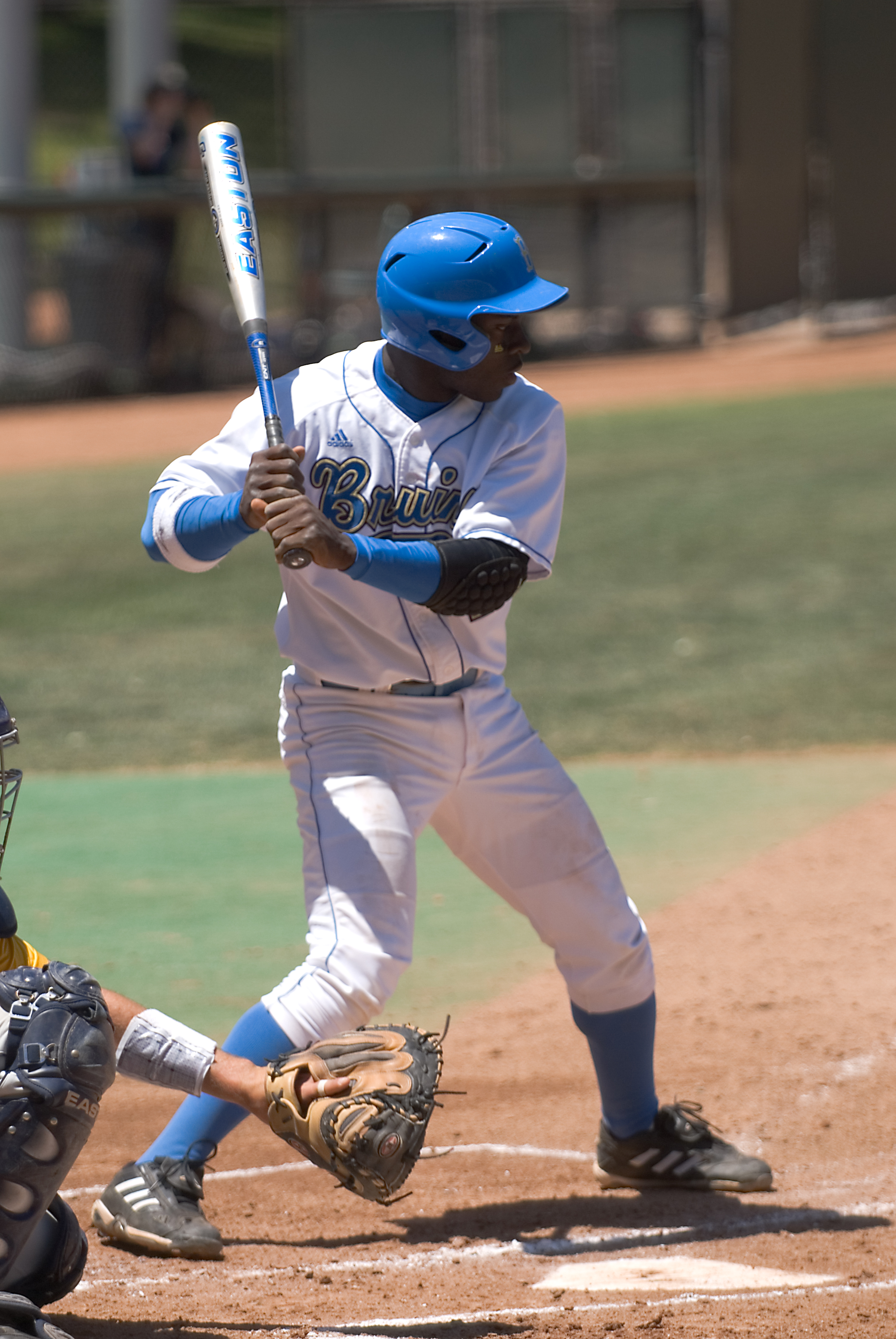
- Curtis playing for the UCLA Bruins in 2007
- Left fielder
- Born: July 10, 1987 (age 38); Panorama City, California, U.S.
- Batted: Right Threw: Right

MLB debut
- April 27, 2013, for the St. Louis Cardinals

Last MLB appearance
- August 14, 2013, for the St. Louis Cardinals

MLB statistics
- Batting average: .000
- Home runs: 0
- Runs batted in: 0
- Stats at Baseball Reference

Teams
- St. Louis Cardinals (2013)

Jermaine Antwann Curtis (born July 10, 1987) is an American former professional baseball left fielder. He played in Major League Baseball (MLB) for the St. Louis Cardinals.

== Career ==
=== Amateur ===
Curtis attended the University of California, Los Angeles (UCLA), where he played college baseball for the UCLA Bruins baseball team. In 2007, he played collegiate summer baseball with the Chatham A's of the Cape Cod Baseball League and was named a league all-star.

=== St. Louis Cardinals ===
The St. Louis Cardinals selected Curtis in the fifth round, with the 155th overall pick, of the 2008 Major League Baseball draft. He made his professional debut that season playing for the Low-A Batavia Muckdogs. In 2009, Curtis played for the High-A Palm Beach Cardinals and Single-A Quad City River Bandits. He played for Palm Beach and the Double-A Springfield Cardinals in 2010. Curtis spent the entire 2011 season with Springfield, but played that winter with the Cañeros de Los Mochis of the Liga Mexicana del Pacífico. He opened the 2012 season with the Triple-A Memphis Redbirds, but ended the season with Double-A Springfield. He again played winter ball with Los Mochis after the season.

Curtis began the 2013 season with Memphis, but was called up by the St. Louis Cardinals on April 26 after Matt Adams was placed on the disabled list. Curtis made his major league debut the next day as a pinch hitter. He was optioned back to Triple-A about a week later after appearing in three games. He was recalled in mid-August, hitting off the bench in two games. In five appearances for St. Louis during his rookie campaign, Curtis went 0-for-3 with one walk. On November 20, 2013, Curtis was removed from the 40-man roster and sent outright to Memphis.

Curtis played the entire 2014 season with Triple-A Memphis, slashing .253/.386/.289 with no home runs, 26 RBI, and five stolen bases across 98 games. He was granted free agency after the season.

=== Cincinnati Reds ===
On December 23, 2014, Curtis signed a minor league contract with the Cincinnati Reds. Excluding a month-and-a-half stint on the disabled list late in the season, he played the entire 2015 season with the Triple-A Louisville Bats. He elected free agency on November 6, 2015, but later re-signed with the Reds.

Curtis spent the 2016 campaign back with Louisville, playing in 89 games and batting .291/.404/.435 with nine home runs and 50 RBI. He elected free agency following the season on November 7, 2016.

=== Oakland Athletics ===
On December 1, 2016, Curtis signed a minor league contract with the Oakland Athletics organization. In 78 games split between the Double–A Midland RockHounds and Triple–A Nashville Sounds, he batted .296/.412/.374 with one home run and 32 RBI. Curtis elected free agency following the season on November 6, 2017.

=== Minnesota Twins ===
On January 21, 2018, Curtis signed a minor league contract with the Minnesota Twins. In 42 appearances for the Triple-A Rochester Red Wings, he hit .200/.352/.254 with one home run, 10 RBI, and three stolen bases. Curtis was released by the Twins organization on June 6.

=== Somerset Patriots ===
On June 26, 2018, Curtis signed with the Somerset Patriots of the Atlantic League of Professional Baseball. In 12 appearances for Somerset, he batted .194/.340/.306 with five RBI. Curtis was released by the Patriots on July 28.

=== Indiana Barn Owls ===
On October 13, 2020, Curtis signed with the Indiana Barn Owls of the Liberation Professional Baseball League. He played in four games for the team, going 3–for–11 (.273) with one RBI and three walks.
