= Audry Pérez =

Dominican baseball player (born 1988)

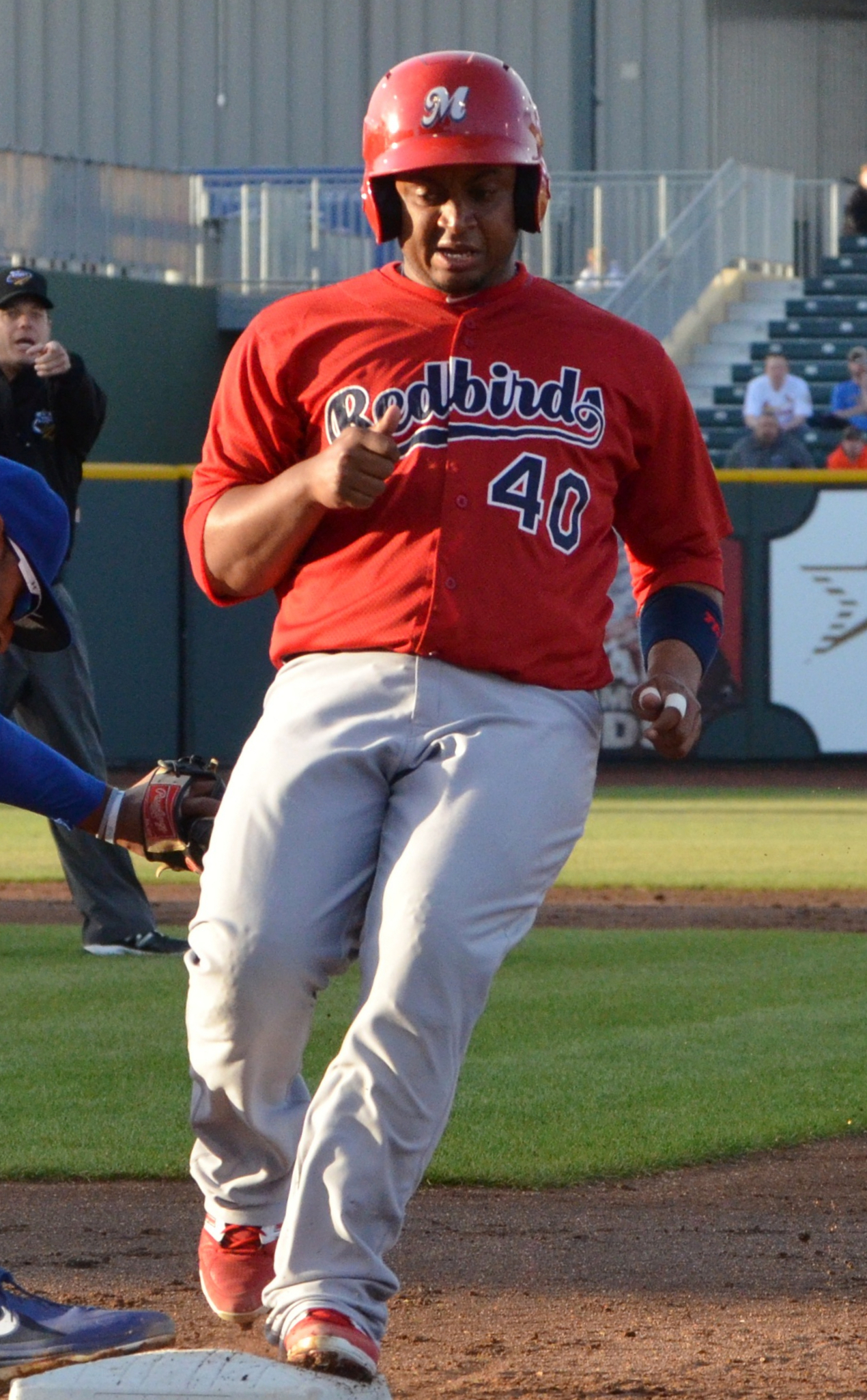
- Pérez with the Memphis Redbirds in 2014
- Catcher
- Born: December 23, 1988 (age 37); Sabana Grande de Palenque, Dominican Republic
- Batted: Right Threw: Right

MLB debut
- September 15, 2013, for the St. Louis Cardinals

Last MLB appearance
- July 10, 2014, for the St. Louis Cardinals

MLB statistics
- Batting average: .000
- Home runs: 0
- Runs batted in: 0
- Stats at Baseball Reference

Teams
- St. Louis Cardinals (2013–2014)

Audris Joel Pérez (born December 23, 1988) is a Dominican former professional baseball catcher. He played in Major League Baseball (MLB) for the St. Louis Cardinals.

== Career ==
=== St. Louis Cardinals ===
On March 20, 2008, Pérez signed with the St. Louis Cardinals as an international free agent. He split his first professional season between the Dominican Summer League Cardinals and rookie-level Gulf Coast League Cardinals. In 2009, Pérez made 40 appearances for the rookie-level Johnson City Cardinals, batting .258/.301/.539 with nine home runs and 23 RBI.

Pérez made 45 appearances for the Low-A Batavia Muckdogs in 2010, slashing .315/.368/.455 with four home runs, 47 RBI, and two stolen bases. He split the 2011 season between the High-A Palm Beach Cardinals and Double-A Springfield Cardinals, batting a cumulative .269/.287/.434 with 11 home runs and 47 RBI.

In 2012, Pérez made 81 appearances for Double-A Springfield, hitting .263/.281/.346 with four home runs and 42 RBI. Pérez began 2013 with Springfield and received a promotion to the Triple-A Memphis Redbirds in July.

On September 3, 2013, Pérez was selected to the 40-man roster and promoted to the major leagues for the first time. He made two appearances for the Cardinals during his rookie campaign, going hitless across one at-bat.

Pérez made only one appearance for the Cardinals the following season, appearing as a pinch hitter for Matt Adams in a 9–1 loss to the Pittsburgh Pirates on July 10, 2014. On September 8, Pérez was designated for assignment by the Cardinals. He cleared waivers and was sent outright to Triple-A Memphis on September 10. Pérez elected free agency on November 3.

=== Baltimore Orioles ===
On November 19, 2014, Pérez signed a minor league contract with the Colorado Rockies that included an invitation to spring training.

On March 31, 2015, Pérez was traded to the Baltimore Orioles in exchange for cash considerations. He spent the year with the Triple–A Norfolk Tides, playing in 78 games and hitting .243/.279/.303 with two home runs and 21 RBI. Pérez was invited to 2016 spring training with Baltimore but did not make the team and would spend the season in Norfolk, where he hit .291/.343/.386 with six home runs and 38 RBI.

Pérez was invited to 2017 spring training but would not make the team again and would split the year between Norfolk and the Double–A Bowie Baysox. In 54 combined appearances, Pérez batted .296/.327/.414 with two home runs and 22 RBI. He elected free agency following the season on November 6, 2017.

On February 1, 2018, Pérez re–signed with the Orioles on a minor league contract. He split the season back with Bowie and Norfolk, accumulating a .224/.242/.276 slash line with no home runs and 12 RBI. Pérez elected free agency following the season on November 2.

On November 20, 2020, Pérez signed with the Ottawa Titans of the Frontier League. However, on December 28, Pérez was released by Ottawa.

On December 1, 2021, Pérez signed with the Evansville Otters of the Frontier League. However, Pérez never appeared for the club, and was released by the Otters on May 8, 2023.
