= John Gast (baseball) =

American baseball player (born 1989)

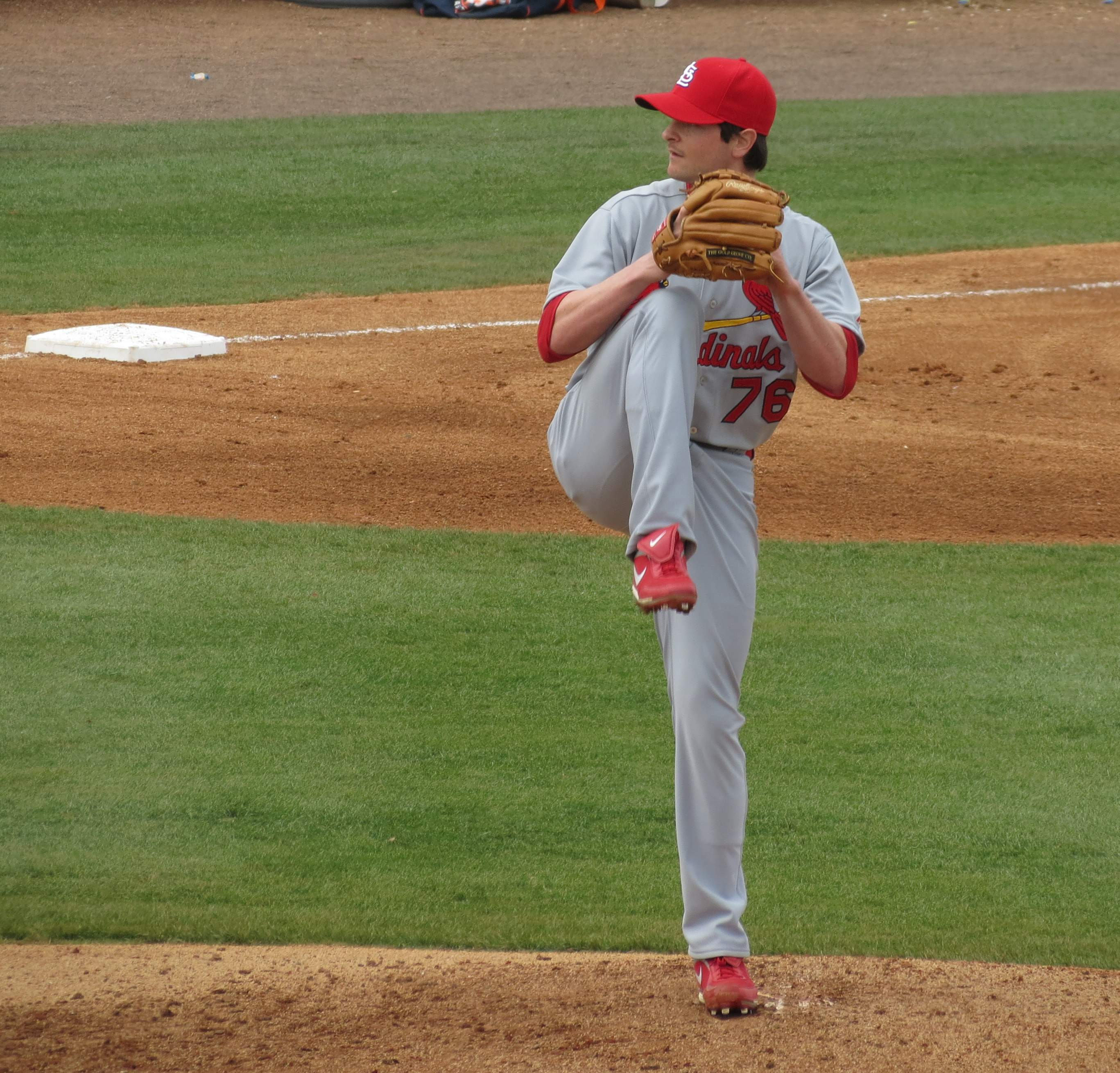
- Gast with the St. Louis Cardinals
- Pitcher
- Born: February 16, 1989 (age 37); Altamonte Springs, Florida, U.S.
- Batted: Left Threw: Left

MLB debut
- May 14, 2013, for the St. Louis Cardinals

Last appearance
- May 25, 2013, for the St. Louis Cardinals

MLB statistics
- Win–loss record: 2–0
- Earned run average: 5.11
- Strikeouts: 8
- Stats at Baseball Reference

Teams
- St. Louis Cardinals (2013)

John Walter Gast (born February 16, 1989) is an American former professional baseball pitcher. He played in Major League Baseball (MLB) for the St. Louis Cardinals in 2013.

== High school and college career ==
Gast attended Lake Brantley High School in Altamonte Springs, Florida where he was a pitching standout. As a senior in 2007 he earned Seminole County "Player of the Year" honors after he struck out 85 batters in 57.2 innings with an ERA of 1.18. He also played on the U.S. Junior National Team. Gast was drafted in the 5th round of the 2007 Major League Baseball draft by the Texas Rangers, but chose to attend Florida State University instead and play college baseball for the Seminoles. Gast suffered an elbow injury during the spring of his senior year in high school, which required Tommy John surgery on May 1, 2007 and forced him to be inactive during most of his first year with the Florida State team. In 2009 Gast played for the Harwich Mariners of the Cape Cod League.

== Professional career ==
=== Minor leagues ===
The St. Louis Cardinals selected Gast in the sixth round (199th overall) of the 2010 Major League Baseball draft.

Gast made his professional debut for the Batavia Muckdogs of the New York–Penn League, finishing the season with a 1.54 ERA and a perfect 6–0 win/loss record. In 2011, Gast split time between the Palm Beach Cardinals and the Double-A affiliate Springfield Cardinals, posting a combined record of nine wins and eight losses. He started the 2012 season back with Springfield, but in mid-May was moved up to Triple-A with the Memphis Redbirds, finishing the year with a 13–7 record.

=== Major League career ===
Gast began the 2013 season with Memphis, where he pitched 32 consecutive scoreless innings. He was named Pacific Coast League pitcher of the week for the week ending April 21. Gast was called up on May 12, 2013, after Jake Westbrook was put on the 15-day disabled list. Gast made his major league debut on May 14, 2013, at Busch Stadium against the New York Mets. Gast threw five shutout innings but gave up four runs in the sixth inning. He gave up six hits total, walked one, and struck out three to earn his first victory as a Cardinal. Gast won in his second start with the Cardinals as well, giving up two runs on four hits and two walks over 5 innings as St. Louis beat the Milwaukee Brewers 4–2. He was placed on the disabled list on May 26, after suffering a shoulder strain. On July 26, Gast underwent season-ending surgery on his left shoulder. According to general manager John Mozeliak, the expected recovery and rehabilitation timeline was 8-12 months. The procedure was the second major surgery for Gast, his first being Tommy John surgery while he was a high school senior.

On November 20, 2013, Gast was removed from the 40-man roster and sent outright to Memphis. He split the 2014 season between Memphis and Palm Beach, accumulating a 3–2 record and 4.62 ERA with 37 strikeouts across 64 1/3 innings pitched.

In 2015, Gast made 24 starts for Memphis, compiling a 7–10 record and 5.03 ERA with 90 strikeouts across 121 2/3 innings pitched. After many complications and injuries, Gast retired from baseball on January 12, 2016.

== Personal ==
John Gast is the son of David and Sharon Gast, and has been an avid baseball fan since age six. His family was present at Busch Stadium when he made his major league debut for the Cardinals. While at Florida State Gast majored in marketing. He excelled academically as well as athletically, being named to the ACC Honor Roll and earning Deans List honors.
