= 2013 American League Championship Series =

44th edition of Major League Baseball's American League Championship Series

| Team (Wins) | Managers | Season |
|---|---|---|
| Boston Red Sox (4) | John Farrell | 97–65 (.599), GA: 5 1/2 |
| Detroit Tigers (2) | Jim Leyland | 93–69 (.574), GA: 1 |
- Dates: October 12–19
- MVP: Koji Uehara (Boston)
- Umpires: Joe West (crew chief), Rob Drake, Ron Kulpa, Alfonso Márquez, Dale Scott, Dan Iassogna

Broadcast
- Television: Fox
- TV announcers: Joe Buck, Tim McCarver, Ken Rosenthal, and Erin Andrews
- Radio: ESPN
- Radio announcers: Jon Sciambi and Chris Singleton
- ALDS: Boston Red Sox over Tampa Bay Rays (3–1); Detroit Tigers over Oakland Athletics (3–2)

The 2013 American League Championship Series was a best-of-seven playoff pitting the top-seeded Boston Red Sox against the defending American League champion and third-seeded Detroit Tigers for the American League pennant and the right to play in the 2013 World Series against the St. Louis Cardinals. The Red Sox won the series 4 games to 2. The series was the 44th in league history, and was the first postseason meeting between the two teams.

Fox aired all games in the United States. This is, to date, the final League Championship series to air in its entirety on broadcast television; all of Fox Sports' subsequent LCS series have been primarily broadcast on FS1.

Koji Uehara was the series MVP.

The Red Sox would go on to defeat the St. Louis Cardinals in the World Series, winning their eighth World Series championship.

== Summary ==
=== Boston Red Sox vs. Detroit Tigers ===
Boston won the series, 4–2.

| Game | Date | Score | Location | Time | Attendance |
|---|---|---|---|---|---|
| 1 | October 12 | Detroit Tigers – 1, Boston Red Sox – 0 | Fenway Park | 3:56 | 38,210 |
| 2 | October 13 | Detroit Tigers – 5, Boston Red Sox – 6 | Fenway Park | 3:28 | 38,029 |
| 3 | October 15 | Boston Red Sox – 1, Detroit Tigers – 0 | Comerica Park | 3:20 (:17 delay) | 42,327 |
| 4 | October 16 | Boston Red Sox – 3, Detroit Tigers – 7 | Comerica Park | 3:27 | 42,765 |
| 5 | October 17 | Boston Red Sox – 4, Detroit Tigers – 3 | Comerica Park | 3:47 | 42,669 |
| 6 | October 19 | Detroit Tigers – 2, Boston Red Sox – 5 | Fenway Park | 3:52 | 38,823 |

== Game summaries ==
=== Game 1 ===
October 12, 2013 8:07 pm (EDT) at Fenway Park in Boston, Massachusetts 55 °F (13 °C), cloudy
| Team | 1 | 2 | 3 | 4 | 5 | 6 | 7 | 8 | 9 | R | H | E |
|---|---|---|---|---|---|---|---|---|---|---|---|---|
| Detroit | 0 | 0 | 0 | 0 | 0 | 1 | 0 | 0 | 0 | 1 | 9 | 0 |
| Boston | 0 | 0 | 0 | 0 | 0 | 0 | 0 | 0 | 0 | 0 | 1 | 1 |
WP: Aníbal Sánchez (1–0) LP: Jon Lester (0–1) Sv: Joaquín Benoit (1); Attendance: 38,210; Boxscore

Five Tiger pitchers (Aníbal Sánchez, Al Alburquerque, José Veras, Drew Smyly and Joaquín Benoit) combined to strike out 17 and hold the Red Sox hitless for 8 1/3 innings. Starter Sánchez struck out 12 and walked six through six shutout innings, but was lifted after throwing 116 pitches. Daniel Nava broke up the no-hitter with a one-out single in the ninth off Benoit. He was then lifted for a pinch-runner, former Tiger Quintin Berry, who stole second base with two outs but was stranded there when Xander Bogaerts popped to shortstop to end the game. Benoit lost the no-hitter, but he earned the save, and the Tigers held on to win 1–0. The only run of the game scored in the sixth when Jhonny Peralta, the only player with multiple hits in the game (three), drove in Miguel Cabrera with an RBI single.

=== Game 2 ===
October 13, 2013 8:07 pm (EDT) at Fenway Park in Boston, Massachusetts 53 °F (12 °C), mostly clear
| Team | 1 | 2 | 3 | 4 | 5 | 6 | 7 | 8 | 9 | R | H | E |
|---|---|---|---|---|---|---|---|---|---|---|---|---|
| Detroit | 0 | 1 | 0 | 0 | 0 | 4 | 0 | 0 | 0 | 5 | 8 | 1 |
| Boston | 0 | 0 | 0 | 0 | 0 | 1 | 0 | 4 | 1 | 6 | 7 | 1 |
WP: Koji Uehara (1–0) LP: Rick Porcello (0–1); Home runs: DET: Miguel Cabrera (1), Alex Avila (1); BOS: David Ortiz (1); Attendance: 38,029; Boxscore

Tiger starters continued their mastery of Red Sox hitters, this time with Max Scherzer on the mound. Scherzer no-hit Boston through the first 5 2/3 innings, struck out 13, and allowed just one run on two hits overall, leaving the game after seven innings with a 5–1 lead. The Tigers got a run in the second inning, when Víctor Martínez doubled, went to third on a Jhonny Peralta single, and scored on a single by Alex Avila. In the top of the sixth, the wheels came off for Red Sox starter Clay Buchholz. Miguel Cabrera hit a one-out home run over the left-field wall to start the scoring. Prince Fielder followed with a double off the left-field wall, then Martínez hit his second double of the night to score Fielder. One out later, Alex Avila hit a two-run homer to right, making the score 5–0. Scherzer allowed his lone run in the bottom of the frame, when Dustin Pedroia doubled to drive in Shane Victorino. That ended a string of 23 consecutive scoreless innings by Tiger pitching, going back to Game 5 of the ALDS against Oakland. Tiger manager Jim Leyland used four relief pitchers in the bottom of the eighth inning, none of whom was very effective. José Veras allowed a one-out double to Will Middlebrooks, and Drew Smyly was brought in to face Jacoby Ellsbury, whom he promptly walked. Al Alburquerque struck out Victorino for the second out of the inning, but Pedroia followed with a single to load the bases. Leyland went to his closer, Joaquín Benoit, to face David Ortiz. On a first-pitch changeup, Ortiz hit a grand slam to tie the game at 5–5. Torii Hunter, in pursuing it to try to make the catch, flipped over the east side of the low Fenway Park bullpen wall at right field, as bullpen cop Steve Horgan raised his arms in celebration slightly behind him, while two other Red Sox catchers inside the bullpen (one of whom caught the Ortiz game-tying blast) were shocked because of Hunter's injury. Hunter had injured himself while trying to make the play. Other teammates from both teams rushed inside the Red Sox bullpen including some teammates from the Tigers, while bullpen cop Steve Horgan held the bullpen door open for the teammates to check on him. Hunter later got up and reported that he was doing alright as he left the bullpen. Meanwhile, after Koji Uehara pitched a perfect ninth, Boston scored the winning run in the bottom of the frame. Jonny Gomes led off with an infield single-off reliever Rick Porcello, and advanced to second on a throwing error by Tiger shortstop José Iglesias. Porcello threw a wild pitch, allowing Gomes to reach third. Jarrod Saltalamacchia followed with a walk-off RBI single to left, giving the Red Sox a wild 6–5 comeback win.

=== Game 3 ===
October 15, 2013 4:07 pm (EDT) at Comerica Park in Detroit, Michigan 62 °F (17 °C), overcast
| Team | 1 | 2 | 3 | 4 | 5 | 6 | 7 | 8 | 9 | R | H | E |
|---|---|---|---|---|---|---|---|---|---|---|---|---|
| Boston | 0 | 0 | 0 | 0 | 0 | 0 | 1 | 0 | 0 | 1 | 4 | 0 |
| Detroit | 0 | 0 | 0 | 0 | 0 | 0 | 0 | 0 | 0 | 0 | 6 | 1 |
WP: John Lackey (1–0) LP: Justin Verlander (0–1) Sv: Koji Uehara (1); Home runs: BOS: Mike Napoli (1); DET: None; Attendance: 42,327; Boxscore

In the bottom of the second, an electrical problem sidelined the game for 17 minutes. However once the game resumed, Game 3 resembled Game 1, featuring outstanding pitching from both teams. Boston's John Lackey gave up four hits and no runs in 6 2/3 innings and struck out eight. Detroit's Justin Verlander, who had not yet allowed a run in the postseason, pitched 6 1/3 shutout innings before allowing a home run to left field off the bat of Mike Napoli. Verlander would exit after eight innings pitched, giving up four hits and striking out ten. Boston escaped a jam in the bottom of the eighth inning when a walk to Austin Jackson and a single by Torii Hunter put runners on first and third with one out. But Red Sox reliever Junichi Tazawa struck out slugger Miguel Cabrera, then Koji Uehara came on and struck out Prince Fielder on three pitches to end the threat. Uehara then completed the ninth inning to earn the save. For Cabrera, this was the first time in 33 career postseason games that he failed to reach base.

=== Game 4 ===
October 16, 2013 8:07 pm (EDT) at Comerica Park in Detroit, Michigan 55 °F (13 °C), overcast
| Team | 1 | 2 | 3 | 4 | 5 | 6 | 7 | 8 | 9 | R | H | E |
|---|---|---|---|---|---|---|---|---|---|---|---|---|
| Boston | 0 | 0 | 0 | 0 | 0 | 1 | 1 | 0 | 1 | 3 | 12 | 0 |
| Detroit | 0 | 5 | 0 | 2 | 0 | 0 | 0 | 0 | X | 7 | 9 | 0 |
WP: Doug Fister (1–0) LP: Jake Peavy (0–1); Attendance: 42,765; Boxscore

The Red Sox sent Jake Peavy to the mound looking to build a commanding 3–1 series lead. However, Peavy struggled in his only start of the series. After a scoreless first inning, Peavy gave up a leadoff single to Víctor Martínez to start the second inning. He then walked both Jhonny Peralta and Alex Avila to load the bases. After Omar Infante was robbed on a diving catch by right fielder Shane Victorino, Austin Jackson walked on four pitches to give the Tigers a 1–0 lead. José Iglesias then hit a potential double-play grounder to second, but Dustin Pedroia bobbled the ball and was only able to force Jackson at second, allowing Peralta to score. Torii Hunter then doubled to score Avila and Iglesias. Hunter would then score on a single to center field by Miguel Cabrera, making the score 5–0 after two innings. In the fourth inning, the Tigers chased Peavy from the game with a ground-rule double by Infante and an RBI single by Jackson. Brandon Workman then replaced Peavy on the mound. After Jackson stole second base, Iglesias sacrificed him to third. One out later, Cabrera singled to score Jackson and make the score 7–0. For the Tigers, Doug Fister scattered eight hits over six innings, striking out seven and giving up only one run on a series of hits in the sixth, capped by an RBI single from Jarrod Saltalamacchia. Shane Victorino and Jacoby Ellsbury would later plate runs of their own off the Tiger bullpen, but it was not enough and the Tigers took Game 4 by a score of 7–3 to even the series at two games apiece.

Tiger leadoff hitter Austin Jackson, struggling with an .091 postseason batting average coming into the game (3–for–33) was dropped to eighth in the batting order by manager Jim Leyland. He responded by reaching base four times (two hits and two walks) while driving in two runs.

=== Game 5 ===
October 17, 2013 8:07 pm (EDT) at Comerica Park in Detroit, Michigan 50 °F (10 °C), overcast
| Team | 1 | 2 | 3 | 4 | 5 | 6 | 7 | 8 | 9 | R | H | E |
|---|---|---|---|---|---|---|---|---|---|---|---|---|
| Boston | 0 | 3 | 1 | 0 | 0 | 0 | 0 | 0 | 0 | 4 | 10 | 0 |
| Detroit | 0 | 0 | 0 | 0 | 1 | 1 | 1 | 0 | 0 | 3 | 10 | 1 |
WP: Jon Lester (1–1) LP: Aníbal Sánchez (1–1) Sv: Koji Uehara (2); Home runs: BOS: Mike Napoli (2); DET: None; Attendance: 42,669; Boxscore

Detroit threatened early against Boston starter Jon Lester. With two on and two out, Jhonny Peralta singled to left field, but Jonny Gomes threw out Miguel Cabrera, who was attempting to score from second base. The Red Sox offense scored early against Tiger starter Aníbal Sánchez, who had baffled them in Game 1. Mike Napoli led off the second inning with a massive home run that landed in the ivy well beyond the 420-foot (130 m) center field wall at Comerica Park. Jonny Gomes then reached on a fielding error by third baseman Miguel Cabrera, and went to third on a one-out double by Xander Bogaerts. Gomes scored on a double by David Ross, making the score 2–0, though Bogaerts only reached third base after he went back to tag up at second. Jacoby Ellsbury then lined a ball off the glove of Sánchez, which trickled away for an infield single, allowing Bogaerts to score the third run of the inning. Ross was then thrown out at the plate by Omar Infante, attempting to score on a ground ball to second by Shane Victorino. On the play, Ross collided with Tigers catcher Alex Avila, injuring Avila's knee. Avila would stay in the game for two more innings while apparently wincing as he moved about. He was eventually pinch hit for by backup catcher Brayan Peña. In the third inning, the Red Sox went up 4–0, when Napoli doubled, went to third on a ground out, and scored on a wild pitch by Sánchez. After holding the Tigers scoreless for 4 2/3 innings, Lester allowed a two-out RBI single by Miguel Cabrera, scoring Austin Jackson from second. Lester then allowed two baserunners in the Tiger sixth before being pulled for reliever Junichi Tazawa. Peña then greeted Tazawa with first-pitch single that plated Victor Martinez, making the score 4–2. The Tigers closed the gap to 4–3 in the seventh, when José Iglesias scored on a double-play grounder by Cabrera. Boston closer Koji Uehara would enter with one out in the eighth inning, recording a perfect 1 2/3 innings, earning a save, and sending the Red Sox back home with a 3–2 series lead.

=== Game 6 ===
October 19, 2013 8:07 pm (EDT) at Fenway Park in Boston, Massachusetts 59 °F (15 °C), mostly cloudy
| Team | 1 | 2 | 3 | 4 | 5 | 6 | 7 | 8 | 9 | R | H | E |
|---|---|---|---|---|---|---|---|---|---|---|---|---|
| Detroit | 0 | 0 | 0 | 0 | 0 | 2 | 0 | 0 | 0 | 2 | 8 | 1 |
| Boston | 0 | 0 | 0 | 0 | 1 | 0 | 4 | 0 | X | 5 | 5 | 1 |
WP: Junichi Tazawa (1–0) LP: Max Scherzer (0–1) Sv: Koji Uehara (3); Home runs: DET: None; BOS: Shane Victorino (1); Attendance: 38,823; Boxscore

Game 6 was originally scheduled for the afternoon, but with the NLCS having ended the night before, MLB and Fox moved the game into primetime. The first pitch came at 8:07 pm EDT.

Both starters, Max Scherzer and Clay Buchholz, were very strong in the early innings. After 4 1/2 scoreless innings, during which Dustin Pedroia missed a home run off the left field foul pole by inches in the third, Boston drew first blood against Scherzer. Xander Bogaerts smacked a two-out double off the Green Monster and scored on a single by Jacoby Ellsbury. Ellsbury, who had only been caught stealing four times out of 56 attempts during the regular season, then tried to swipe second but was thrown out. Buchholz allowed Torii Hunter and Miguel Cabrera to reach base in the top of the sixth and was relieved by Franklin Morales. Morales did not record a single out, walking Prince Fielder and allowing a two-run single by Víctor Martínez to make the score 2–1. Brandon Workman then came in and induced a bizarre double play in which Martinez was tagged by Dustin Pedroia, followed by Fielder getting caught between third and home in a rundown.

Jonny Gomes led off the seventh with a double and after a Stephen Drew strikeout and a walk by Bogaerts, Ellsbury hit a ground ball that popped out of the glove of José Iglesias for an error. That brought up Shane Victorino, who coming into this at bat was 2–for–23 in the series. Victorino crushed an 0–2 José Veras curveball over the Green Monster for a grand slam and a 5–2 Red Sox lead. After Craig Breslow tossed a perfect eighth, Koji Uehara, who would receive MVP honors, earned the save by pitching a scoreless ninth.

With the victory, the Red Sox won their third pennant in a span of ten years and set a Fall Classic rematch with the St. Louis Cardinals, whom they swept in 2004 to win their first World Series in 86 years.

== Composite line score ==
2013 ALCS (4–2): Boston Red Sox over Detroit Tigers

| Team | 1 | 2 | 3 | 4 | 5 | 6 | 7 | 8 | 9 | R | H | E |
|---|---|---|---|---|---|---|---|---|---|---|---|---|
| Detroit Tigers | 0 | 6 | 0 | 2 | 1 | 8 | 1 | 0 | 0 | 18 | 50 | 4 |
| Boston Red Sox | 0 | 3 | 1 | 0 | 1 | 2 | 6 | 4 | 2 | 19 | 39 | 3 |
Total attendance: 242,823 Average attendance: 40,470

== Aftermath ==
Former Tiger J.D. Martinez signed a free agent contract with the Red Sox during the 2017-2018 off-season to essentially replace David Ortiz at designated hitter, who retired after the 2016 season. In 2017, the Red Sox's first season in 15 years without David Ortiz, the team struggled mightily at designated hitter and with runners in scoring position. It turned out Martinez fit the Red Sox like a glove in 2018, as he finished 4th in MVP voting (his teammate Mookie Betts won the award), hitting .330 and batting in a league-high 130 runs. As for the team, the Red Sox set a new franchise record for wins in a season at 108, surpassing the 1912 team (105). Like the 1912 and 2013 teams, the Red Sox would later go on to win the World Series in 2018, beating the Los Angeles Dodgers in five games.

Also on the 2018 Red Sox was long-time Tigers pitcher Rick Porcello, who would finally reach his potential in 2016, winning 22 games and a Cy Young Award in Boston.

The Tigers have not been back to an AL Championship Series since 2013. Manager Jim Leyland retired following the season and would be replaced by former Tiger player Brad Ausmus. Detroit would make one final push for a World Series the following season, acquiring All-Stars Ian Kinsler and David Price in trades and featuring a pitching rotation that would include five past or future Cy Young winners. The Tigers would win the AL Central for the fourth straight year with a 90-72 record, but were defeated by the Baltimore Orioles in the American League Division Series. Detroit would go on to post losing records in eight of the next nine seasons and wouldn’t return to the playoffs until the 2024 postseason.
