= 2013 World Series =

109th edition of Major League Baseball's 7 game championship series

Team (Wins)	Managers	Season
Boston Red Sox (4)	John Farrell	97–65, .599, GA: 5 1/2
St. Louis Cardinals (2)	Mike Matheny	97–65, .599, GA: 3
- Dates: October 23–30
- Venue(s): Fenway Park (Boston); Busch Stadium (St. Louis)
- MVP: David Ortiz (Boston)
- Umpires: John Hirschbeck (crew chief), Mark Wegner, Dana DeMuth, Paul Emmel, Bill Miller, Jim Joyce
- Hall of Famers: Red Sox: David Ortiz; Cardinals: Carlos Beltrán

Broadcast
- Television: Fox (United States); MLB International (International)
- TV announcers: Joe Buck, Tim McCarver, Ken Rosenthal and Erin Andrews (Fox); Gary Thorne and Rick Sutcliffe (MLB International)
- Radio: ESPN; WEEI-FM (BOS); KMOX (STL)
- Radio announcers: Dan Shulman and Orel Hershiser (ESPN); Joe Castiglione and Dave O'Brien (WEEI); Mike Shannon and John Rooney (KMOX)
- ALCS: Boston Red Sox over Detroit Tigers (4–2)
- NLCS: St. Louis Cardinals over Los Angeles Dodgers (4–2)

The 2013 World Series was the championship series of Major League Baseball's (MLB) 2013 season. The 109th edition of the World Series, it was a best-of-seven playoff between the American League (AL) champion Boston Red Sox and the National League (NL) champion St. Louis Cardinals; the Red Sox won, 4 games to 2 to win their eighth championship. The Red Sox had home field advantage for the series, based on the AL's win in the 2013 MLB All-Star Game on July 16. This was the first World Series since 1999 to feature both number one seeds from the AL and NL. The Series started on October 23, 2013, ending with Game 6 on October 30, 2013.

The Red Sox won the first game at Fenway Park on October 23, followed by the Cardinals winning the second game on October 24 to tie the series, 1–1. The series then moved to Busch Stadium, where the Cardinals won the third game on October 26 to gain a 2–1 lead. The Red Sox won the fourth game on October 27 to tie the series at 2–2, then won the last of three games at Busch Stadium on October 28 for a 3–2 lead. The series then moved back to Fenway Park, where the Red Sox decisively won the final game on October 30, becoming the World Series champions for 2013.

This was the fourth meeting of the Cardinals and the Red Sox in the World Series (previously meeting in 1946, 1967, and 2004). It was also the first World Series since 1958 to feature two teams with identical regular season records. Winning in six games, the Red Sox clinched their third World Series championship since 1918. David Ortiz was awarded the World Series Most Valuable Player Award. He became the first non-Yankee to win three World Series titles with one team since Jim Palmer (Baltimore Orioles 1966, 1970, and 1983). This was the last time a championship was clinched on a team's home field until 2022 (the designated home team clinched in 2020, but at a neutral site).

== Background ==
This was the tenth meeting between teams from Boston and St. Louis for a major professional sports championship, which previously happened in three World Series (1946, 1967, 2004), four NBA Finals (1957, 1958, 1960, 1961), Super Bowl XXXVI in 2002, and the 1970 Stanley Cup Final.

=== St. Louis Cardinals ===
The Cardinals finished the 2013 regular season at 97–65, earning the best record in the National League. They set a new Major League Baseball record for hitting efficiency with runners in scoring position, hitting .330 (447–for–1,355), the best in baseball since the Boston Red Sox hit .312 in 1950, also beating the 2007 Detroit Tigers, and 1996 Colorado Rockies with a .311 average.

Despite losing first baseman Albert Pujols to the Angels and manager Tony La Russa to retirement after their 2011 World Series triumph, the Cardinals under new manager Mike Matheny still came within one game of a return trip to the World Series, but lost the final three games to the eventual World Series champion San Francisco Giants in the 2012 National League Championship Series. However, with the help of Matheny and general manager John Mozeliak, the Cardinals were able to stay in contention even with a roster consisting mostly of rookies, free-agent veteran additions, and a few holdovers from the 2011 championship team.

The Cardinals' offense was led by catcher Yadier Molina, second baseman Matt Carpenter, and first baseman Allen Craig, all of whom finished in the top 10 in batting average. They were joined by outfielders Carlos Beltrán and Matt Holliday, third baseman David Freese, and first baseman Matt Adams. The Cardinals' pitching staff were led by Adam Wainwright, who returned to form after posting an NL-leading 19 wins. Wainwright was joined by youngsters Lance Lynn, Joe Kelly, Shelby Miller, and late-season call-up Michael Wacha. Wainwright's return to form, along with the emergence of the young starters, helped fill the void left by star pitcher Chris Carpenter, who missed the entire season due to various injuries. The bullpen were also powered by youngsters, led by closer Trevor Rosenthal, set-up man Carlos Martínez, and middle relievers Seth Maness and Kevin Siegrist.

The top-seeded Cardinals opened the playoffs by defeating the #4 seed Pittsburgh Pirates in five games in the Division Series. Then, in their third consecutive National League Championship Series appearance, St. Louis defeated the third-seeded Los Angeles Dodgers four games to two for their 19th National League pennant.

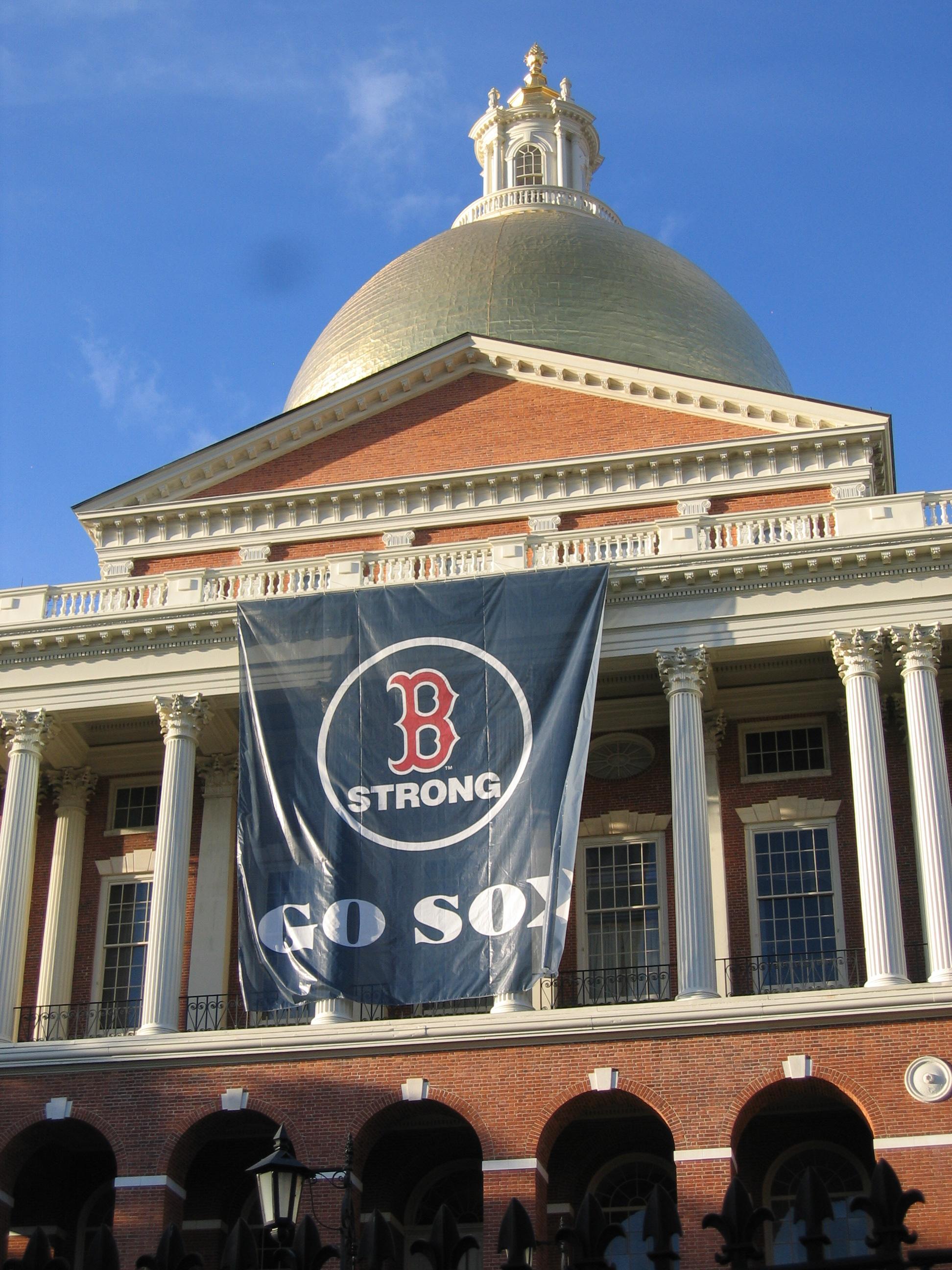
The Massachusetts State House displaying a banner in honor of the Boston Red Sox's 2013 World Series appearance

=== Boston Red Sox ===
After finishing last in the AL East with a 69–93 record in 2012, the Red Sox fired Bobby Valentine and hired John Farrell as their new manager. Under Farrell, the team finished the 2013 regular season at 97–65, the best record in the American League.

In the aftermath of the infamous September collapse in 2011 and the ill-fated Valentine experiment of 2012, general manager Ben Cherington brought in Farrell, a former pitching coach under Terry Francona, and several role players in hopes of turning the Red Sox around. The Boston Marathon bombing on April 15 helped inspire a season-long rally for the Red Sox in support of the victims and the city of Boston. In games after the marathon, the Red Sox hung a jersey on the dugout saying Boston Strong and 617, representing the city's area code. The team also wore "B Strong" patches in their uniforms. In addition, some of the Red Sox players grew beards during the season as a sign of unity. The inspired play of the Red Sox took them from last place the previous season to American League East champions with a 28-game turnaround, helped by Farrell's calming presence and familiarity with some of the players.

Boston's offense was powered by designated hitter David Ortiz, who hit .309 during the season. They also relied on the baserunning exploits of center fielder Jacoby Ellsbury, whose 52 stolen bases led the major leagues, while right fielder Shane Victorino, second baseman Dustin Pedroia, first baseman Mike Napoli, catcher Jarrod Saltalamacchia, and outfielder Jonny Gomes helped the Red Sox to a league-leading 853 runs scored. The pitching staff was led by Jon Lester, who rebounded from a miserable 2012 campaign to post a 15–8 record and 3.75 ERA. Lester was joined by Clay Buchholz, John Lackey and midseason acquisition Jake Peavy. The bullpen were led by closer Koji Uehara, who unexpectedly took over following injuries to Joel Hanrahan and Andrew Bailey to post 21 saves and a 1.09 ERA. He was joined by compatriot and set-up man Junichi Tazawa, and middle relievers Brandon Workman and Craig Breslow. While Stephen Drew and David Ross were limited offensively, their defense proved to be an asset to the team's success, especially during the postseason.

The top-seeded Red Sox opened the playoffs by defeating the fifth-seeded Tampa Bay Rays in four games in the Division Series. Then in the American League Championship Series, the Red Sox defeated the third-seeded Detroit Tigers in six games to win their 13th American League pennant.

== Summary ==
Boston won the series, 4–2.

Game	Date	Score	Location	Time	Attendance
1	October 23	St. Louis Cardinals – 1, Boston Red Sox – 8	Fenway Park	3:17	38,345
2	October 24	St. Louis Cardinals – 4, Boston Red Sox – 2	Fenway Park	3:05	38,436
3	October 26	Boston Red Sox – 4, St. Louis Cardinals – 5	Busch Stadium	3:54	47,432
4	October 27	Boston Red Sox – 4, St. Louis Cardinals – 2	Busch Stadium	3:34	47,469
5	October 28	Boston Red Sox – 3, St. Louis Cardinals – 1	Busch Stadium	2:52	47,436
6	October 30	St. Louis Cardinals – 1, Boston Red Sox – 6	Fenway Park	3:13	38,447

== Matchups ==
=== Game 1 ===
October 23, 2013 8:09 pm (EDT) at Fenway Park in Boston, Massachusetts, 50 °F (10 °C), cloudy
Team	1	2	3	4	5	6	7	8	9	R	H	E
St. Louis	0	0	0	0	0	0	0	0	1	1	7	3
Boston	3	2	0	0	0	0	2	1	X	8	8	1
WP: Jon Lester (1–0) LP: Adam Wainwright (0–1); Home runs: STL: Matt Holliday (1); BOS: David Ortiz (1); Attendance: 38,345; Boxscore

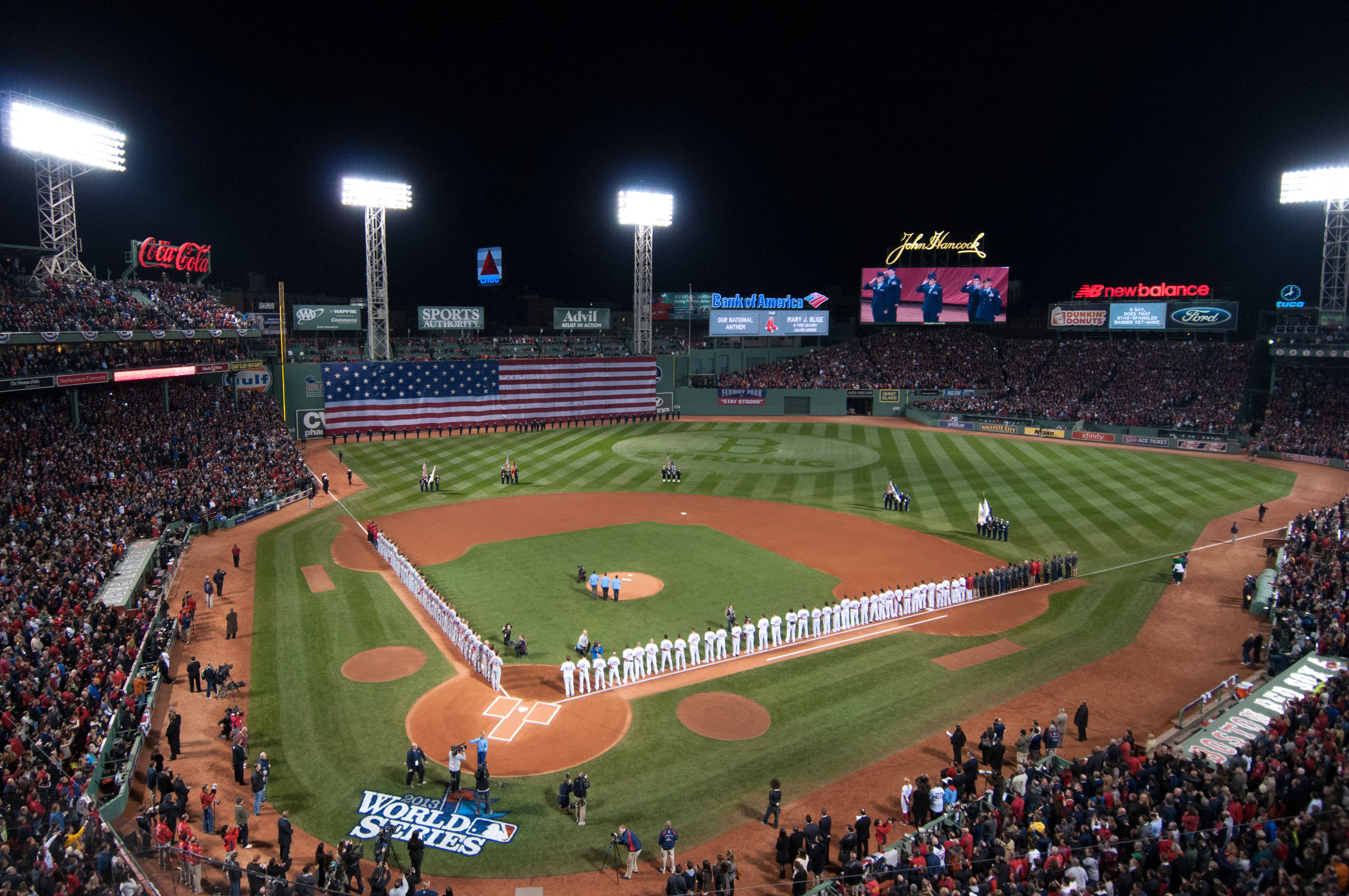
Fenway Park during the pregame ceremony

Boston Hall of Famer Carl Yastrzemski threw the ceremonial first pitch, as he had done before Game 1 in 2004 and 2007 while Mary J. Blige sang the national anthem. After Boston starter Jon Lester pitched a scoreless top half of the first inning, St. Louis ace Adam Wainwright found trouble in the bottom of the inning. He walked leadoff batter Jacoby Ellsbury and after an out, Dustin Pedroia singled. Wainwright then got David Ortiz to ground to second base, but Matt Carpenter's flip was mishandled by shortstop Pete Kozma, ending the possibility of a double play. Initially, the Cardinals had been awarded a force-out at second base, but after conferring, the umpires ruled that Kozma never had control of the ball, and Pedroia was reinstated at second base. With the bases loaded and one out, Mike Napoli doubled to left-center, scoring Ellsbury, Pedroia and Ortiz, the latter after Shane Robinson misplayed a carom off the wall. In the bottom of the second inning, Stephen Drew led off with a pop-up in front of the pitcher's mound. Wainwright and catcher Yadier Molina both converged, but both let the ball drop for a leadoff single. David Ross then singled to center field, followed by a flyout by Ellsbury. Shane Victorino then hit a ground ball to deep short, but Kozma again mishandled it, his second error of the game, and once again the bases were loaded with one out. Pedroia then singled under the glove of a diving David Freese to make the score 4–0. Ortiz then hit a deep fly to right field, but was robbed of a grand slam by Carlos Beltrán. Ross did tag and score to give Boston a 5–0 lead. Beltrán would leave the game, with Robinson moving to right field, and Jon Jay taking over in center. Meanwhile, Lester was brilliant for the Red Sox, pitching 7 2/3 scoreless innings. The Red Sox added to their lead in the bottom of the seventh with Ortiz hitting a two-run home run off Kevin Siegrist to give them a 7–0 lead. After the Red Sox plated another run in the eighth inning, the Cardinals finally got on the board with Matt Holliday leading off the ninth with a home run off Ryan Dempster. Dempster recovered and closed out the 8–1 victory by striking out Matt Adams. Lester was accused of using a foreign substance on his glove, but he claimed that it was just rosin, which is legal, and the Cardinals organization elected to not file a complaint.

=== Game 2 ===
October 24, 2013 8:07 pm (EDT) at Fenway Park in Boston, Massachusetts, 49 °F (9 °C), clear
Team	1	2	3	4	5	6	7	8	9	R	H	E
St. Louis	0	0	0	1	0	0	3	0	0	4	7	1
Boston	0	0	0	0	0	2	0	0	0	2	4	2
WP: Michael Wacha (1–0) LP: John Lackey (0–1) Sv: Trevor Rosenthal (1); Home runs: STL: None; BOS: David Ortiz (2); Attendance: 38,436; Boxscore

Game 2 pitted the NLCS MVP Michael Wacha against the Red Sox' John Lackey. Several members of the 2004 Red Sox championship team, including Pedro Martínez, threw ceremonial first pitches while Boston native James Taylor sang the national anthem. After three scoreless innings, Matt Holliday led off the fourth inning for the Cardinals with a triple to center field. After Matt Adams lined out, catcher Yadier Molina grounded out softly to Dustin Pedroia to score Holliday and give the Cardinals a 1–0 lead. The Red Sox threatened in the bottom half as the first two batters reached with Pedroia leading off with a double and David Ortiz drawing a walk. Mike Napoli then grounded into a double play to partially kill the threat and Wacha got Jonny Gomes to pop out to Matt Carpenter to end the inning. In the bottom of the sixth inning, the Red Sox finally got on the scoreboard, as Pedroia walked with one out and Ortiz hit a two-run home run to left center field on a 3–2 changeup to give the Red Sox a 2–1 lead. In the seventh inning, the Red Sox' defense let them down. With one out and the bases loaded (David Freese walked, Jon Jay singled and Daniel Descalso walked), Carpenter hit a fly ball to Gomes in left field for the second out. With Pete Kozma, who pinch-ran for Freese, scoring on the throw, the ball got away from catcher Jarrod Saltalamacchia. Jay and Descalso attempted to advance on the misplay and pitcher Craig Breslow, who was backing up on the play, tried to get Jay at third but his throw was wild and went into the stands. Jay scored and Descalsco went to third as the Cardinals now led 3–2. Carlos Beltrán then singled to right to score Descalso and give the Cardinals a 4–2 lead. Things got a little interesting in the bottom of the eighth inning. With Carlos Martinez on the mound for the Cardinals, the Red Sox had Jacoby Ellsbury reach on an error and after two strikeouts, Ortiz reached on a single. With two outs, Martinez jammed Napoli and he popped out to short to end the inning. In the bottom of the ninth with the 4–2 lead, Cardinals closer Trevor Rosenthal entered the game and made quick work of the Red Sox by striking out Gomes, Saltalamacchia and pinch-hitter Daniel Nava on 17 pitches. The Cardinals evened up the series at one game each as the series shifted to St. Louis for the next three games.

This was the Red Sox first World Series loss since Game 7 in 1986, and St. Louis snapped Boston's nine-game winning streak in the World Series.

=== Game 3 ===
October 26, 2013 7:08 pm (CDT) at Busch Stadium in St. Louis, Missouri, 58 °F (14 °C), clear
Team	1	2	3	4	5	6	7	8	9	R	H	E
Boston	0	0	0	0	1	1	0	2	0	4	6	2
St. Louis	2	0	0	0	0	0	2	0	1	5	12	0
WP: Trevor Rosenthal (1–0) LP: Brandon Workman (0–1); Attendance: 47,432; Boxscore

The ceremonial first pitch was thrown by 1985 NL MVP Willie McGee while Colbie Caillat sang the national anthem. The Cardinals got off to a good start in the bottom of the first inning, putting two on the board from RBI singles by Matt Holliday and Yadier Molina off of Boston starter Jake Peavy. It wasn't until the top of the fifth inning before the Red Sox got on the board themselves, when pinch hitter Mike Carp grounded into a fielder's choice off Cardinals starter Joe Kelly. In the next inning, Boston tied the game at 2–2 on a Daniel Nava single. But in the bottom of the seventh, Matt Holliday hit a line drive off of reliever Junichi Tazawa that just got past a diving Will Middlebrooks that drove in two, and Holliday advanced to third on the throw. Even though this happened with no outs, Holliday was stranded at third. Boston quickly responded in the top of the eighth by loading the bases off Carlos Martínez. Trevor Rosenthal came in to pitch, and the first batter he faced, Daniel Nava, grounded in to a fielder's choice, after a great diving stop by rookie second baseman Kolten Wong. The next batter, Xander Bogaerts, bounced a ball up the middle for an RBI single of his own, knotting the game at 4–4.

In the bottom of the ninth inning, Boston reliever Brandon Workman stayed in, having pitched in the eighth inning and having batted in the top of the ninth, striking out in his first professional at bat. He gave up a one out single to Molina. Boston closer Koji Uehara was brought in to face pinch hitter Allen Craig, who doubled on the first pitch. With one out, Jon Jay hit a grounder to second baseman Dustin Pedroia. He made a diving stab and threw home to catcher Jarrod Saltalamacchia, who tagged out the sliding Molina. But then Saltalamacchia threw to third trying to get Craig, who was running on the play. Saltalamacchia's throw was wide, and it pulled third baseman Will Middlebrooks toward the second-base side of the bag. Middlebrooks tried to keep the ball on the infield, but it skipped into foul territory. Craig slid into third, popped up and started for home. He made contact with Middlebrooks, who was lying face-first on the dirt, with his feet in the air. Craig fell, got back up and ran home. Saltalamacchia, receiving the throw from foul territory, applied the tag to the sliding Craig. However, the third base umpire, Jim Joyce, called obstruction on the play; home plate umpire Dana DeMuth determined that Craig would have scored without the obstruction, giving the Cardinals the win and a 2–1 lead in the World Series. The Red Sox were furious about the call, as manager John Farrell stayed out to argue the call, as did most of the players. They protested that Middlebrooks' feet were in the air as he was getting up when Craig ran over him.

The largest paid crowd in the history of Busch Stadium (47,432) saw the game. It was the first time in a World Series game that a winning play was on an obstruction call and only the second time in baseball history.

To date, this remains the Cardinals' most recent win in a World Series game.

=== Game 4 ===
October 27, 2013 7:17 pm (CDT) at Busch Stadium in St. Louis, Missouri, 52 °F (11 °C), clear
Team	1	2	3	4	5	6	7	8	9	R	H	E
Boston	0	0	0	0	1	3	0	0	0	4	6	2
St. Louis	0	0	1	0	0	0	1	0	0	2	6	0
WP: Félix Doubront (1–0) LP: Lance Lynn (0–1) Sv: Koji Uehara (1); Home runs: BOS: Jonny Gomes (1); STL: None; Attendance: 47,469; Boxscore

The largest paid crowd in the history of Busch Stadium (47,469) saw the game, surpassing the previous night's record attendance. Hall of Famer and two-time World Series MVP Bob Gibson threw the ceremonial first pitch while country music group Rascal Flatts sang the national anthem. After Boston starter Clay Buchholz, pitching through a shoulder injury, was removed for a pinch-hitter after four innings, five Red Sox relievers combined to hold St. Louis to one run on three hits the rest of the way. In the sixth inning, the bases were empty with two outs before Dustin Pedroia singled and David Ortiz walked. Then, outfielder Jonny Gomes came to bat and the Cardinals brought in Seth Maness to face him. Gomes worked the count to 2–2 before he broke the tie with a three-run homer that would become the difference in the game. The game ended when Boston closer Koji Uehara picked off pinch runner Kolten Wong with Carlos Beltrán at the plate, making it the first postseason game in baseball history to end on a pickoff. (However, it was not the first time a World Series game ended with a runner being tagged out during an at-bat; in the 1926 World Series, Babe Ruth was caught stealing for the final out of Game 7.)

Felix Doubront pitched 2 2/3 innings out of the bullpen to earn his first career postseason win. John Lackey, who pitched a scoreless eighth, made his first relief appearance since 2004 and first in the postseason since 2002.

=== Game 5 ===
October 28, 2013 7:07 pm (CDT) at Busch Stadium in St. Louis, Missouri, 61 °F (16 °C), clear
Team	1	2	3	4	5	6	7	8	9	R	H	E
Boston	1	0	0	0	0	0	2	0	0	3	9	0
St. Louis	0	0	0	1	0	0	0	0	0	1	4	0
WP: Jon Lester (2–0) LP: Adam Wainwright (0–2) Sv: Koji Uehara (2); Home runs: BOS: None; STL: Matt Holliday (2); Attendance: 47,436; Boxscore

Hall of Fame inductee Ozzie Smith threw the ceremonial first pitch while Harry Connick Jr. sang the national anthem. In a rematch of the staff who faced off in Game 1, Jon Lester again outdueled Adam Wainwright to give the Red Sox a 3–2 series lead. Boston scored first for the first time since Game 1 when Dustin Pedroia and David Ortiz hit back-to-back doubles with one out in the first. Matt Holliday tied the score with a home run to center in the fourth inning, but it would be the only run Lester would allow over strong 7 2/3 innings of work. Wainwright matched Lester until the seventh inning, when a ground-rule RBI double by David Ross and RBI single by Jacoby Ellsbury scored Xander Bogaerts and Stephen Drew to give Boston a 3–1 lead. Koji Uehara relieved Lester with two outs in the eighth and retired all four Cardinals he faced to earn his second save of the series.

Uehara tied John Wetteland, Robb Nen, Troy Percival, and Brad Lidge for most saves in one postseason year, with 7 (since then, Greg Holland matched this record the next year). In addition, Lester joined Babe Ruth as the only Red Sox lefthanders to win three World Series games.

=== Game 6 ===
External videos
- Game 6 Full replay on the MLB's official YouTube channel

October 30, 2013 8:07 pm (EDT) at Fenway Park in Boston, Massachusetts, 49 °F (9 °C), partly cloudy
Team	1	2	3	4	5	6	7	8	9	R	H	E
St. Louis	0	0	0	0	0	0	1	0	0	1	9	1
Boston	0	0	3	3	0	0	0	0	X	6	8	1
WP: John Lackey (1–1) LP: Michael Wacha (1–1); Home runs: STL: None; BOS: Stephen Drew (1); Attendance: 38,447; Boxscore

Boston Red Sox Hall of Fame members Carlton Fisk and Luis Tiant, both of whom played in historic Game 6 of the 1975 World Series, threw ceremonial first pitches. The national anthem was performed by Celtic punk band Dropkick Murphys. Boston won Game 6 in a rout, by scoring six runs on the Cardinals rookie Michael Wacha, who had previously been unbeaten in the playoffs. World Series Most Valuable Player David Ortiz was walked by the Cardinals four times, and scored twice. Boston's Shane Victorino opened the scoring with a three-run double in the third inning and had four runs batted in. Red Sox pitcher John Lackey pitched six scoreless innings. The Cardinals only seriously threatened in the seventh inning when they scored on Carlos Beltrán's single and had the bases loaded with two outs, but Boston reliever Junichi Tazawa got the final out. Koji Uehara came in again to pitch a perfect ninth, striking out Matt Carpenter swinging to end the game, series, baseball season, and clinch their eighth overall title.

With this win, Boston won the championship at Fenway Park for the first time since 1918. The win was the third championship in the last ten seasons for the Red Sox. This was the most recent World Series in which the championship was won by the home team until 2020, which the Dodgers won the series clinching Game 6 as the home team (Game 6 in 2020 however was not played at Dodger Stadium due to the then-current COVID-19 pandemic). The next time a team won at their home stadium was when the Houston Astros won the 2022 World Series. The Red Sox were the first team to go from last place to the World Series title since the Minnesota Twins did so in 1991.

The average list price on the resale market for a ticket to Game 6 was $1,860, according to TiqIQ, a ticket tracking company.

=== Composite line score ===
2013 World Series (4–2): Boston Red Sox (A.L.) beat St. Louis Cardinals (N.L.)

Team	1	2	3	4	5	6	7	8	9	R	H	E
St. Louis Cardinals	2	0	1	2	0	0	7	0	2	14	45	5
Boston Red Sox	4	2	3	3	2	6	4	3	0	27	41	8
Home runs: STL: Matt Holliday (2); BOS: Stephen Drew (1), Jonny Gomes (1), David Ortiz (2); Total attendance: 257,565 Average attendance: 42,928; Winning player's share: $307,322.68 Losing player's share: $228,300.17

== Series statistics ==
=== Boston Red Sox ===
==== Batting ====
Note: GP=Games played; AB=At bats; R=Runs; H=Hits; 2B=Doubles; 3B=Triples; HR=Home runs; RBI=Runs batted in; BB=Walks; AVG=Batting average; OBP=On base percentage; SLG=Slugging percentage

Player	GP	AB	R	H	2B	3B	HR	RBI	BB	AVG	OBP	SLG	Reference
David Ross	4	16	1	3	1	0	0	1	0	.188	.188	.250	
Mike Napoli	5	13	0	2	1	0	0	4	1	.154	.214	.231	
Xander Bogaerts	6	21	2	5	0	1	0	2	1	.238	.261	.333	
Stephen Drew	6	19	3	3	0	0	1	2	1	.158	.190	.316	
Jonny Gomes	6	17	2	2	0	0	1	3	3	.118	.286	.294	
Jacoby Ellsbury	6	24	4	6	1	0	0	1	2	.250	.308	.292	
Shane Victorino	4	13	2	2	1	0	0	4	2	.154	.313	.231	
David Ortiz	6	16	7	11	2	0	2	6	8	.688	.760	1.188	
Daniel Nava	5	14	1	2	1	0	0	2	0	.143	.143	.214	
Jarrod Saltalamacchia	2	6	0	0	0	0	0	0	2	.000	.250	.000	
Mike Carp	2	2	0	0	0	0	0	1	0	.000	.000	.000	
Will Middlebrooks	1	2	0	0	0	0	0	0	0	.000	.000	.000	
Quintin Berry	1	0	0	0	0	0	0	0	0	─	─	─	
Jon Lester	2	3	0	0	0	0	0	0	0	.000	.000	.000	
Felix Doubront	2	1	0	0	0	0	0	0	0	.000	.000	.000	
Clay Buchholz	1	1	0	0	0	0	0	0	0	.000	.000	.000	
Jake Peavy	1	1	0	0	0	0	0	0	0	.000	.000	.000	
Brandon Workman	3	1	0	0	0	0	0	0	0	.000	.000	.000	

==== Pitching ====
Note: G=Games Played; GS=Games Started; IP=Innings Pitched; H=Hits; BB=Walks; R=Runs; ER=Earned Runs; SO=Strikeouts; W=Wins; L=Losses; SV=Saves; ERA=Earned Run Average

Player	G	GS	IP	H	BB	R	ER	SO	W	L	SV	ERA	Reference
Jon Lester	2	2	15 1/3	9	1	1	1	15	2	0	0	0.59	
Felix Doubront	2	0	4 2/3	2	1	1	1	3	1	0	0	1.93	
Clay Buchholz	1	1	4	3	3	1	0	2	0	0	0	0.00	
Jake Peavy	1	1	4	6	1	2	2	4	0	0	0	4.50	
Brandon Workman	3	0	3 1/3	3	1	1	0	1	0	1	0	0.00	
John Lackey	3	2	14	14	3	4	4	11	1	1	0	2.57	
Koji Uehara	5	0	4 2/3	2	0	0	0	3	0	0	2	0.00	
Junichi Tazawa	5	0	2 1/3	1	1	0	0	3	0	0	0	0.00	
Ryan Dempster	1	0	1	2	0	1	1	1	0	0	0	9.00	
Craig Breslow	3	0	0 1/3	3	2	3	2	0	0	0	0	54.00	

=== St. Louis Cardinals ===
==== Batting ====
Note: GP=Games played; AB=At bats; R=Runs; H=Hits; 2B=Doubles; 3B=Triples; HR=Home runs; RBI=Runs batted in; BB=Walks; AVG=Batting average; OBP=On base percentage; SLG=Slugging percentage

Player	GP	AB	R	H	2B	3B	HR	RBI	BB	AVG	OBP	SLG	Reference
Yadier Molina	6	23	0	7	1	0	0	2	1	.304	.333	.348	
Matt Adams	6	22	0	3	1	0	0	0	0	.136	.136	.182	
Matt Carpenter	6	27	3	8	1	0	0	2	0	.296	.286	.333	
David Freese	6	19	0	3	1	0	0	0	3	.158	.273	.211	
Pete Kozma	4	10	1	0	0	0	0	0	0	.000	.000	.000	
Matt Holliday	6	24	4	6	1	1	2	5	1	.250	.280	.625	
Jon Jay	6	18	1	3	0	0	0	0	3	.167	.286	.167	
Carlos Beltrán	6	17	1	5	0	0	0	3	2	.294	.400	.294	
Allen Craig	6	16	1	6	1	0	0	0	1	.375	.412	.438	
Daniel Descalso	4	10	2	1	0	0	0	0	2	.100	.250	.100	
Shane Robinson	4	8	1	2	1	0	0	0	0	.250	.250	.375	
Kolten Wong	2	1	0	1	0	0	0	0	0	1.000	1.000	1.000	
Adam Wainwright	2	2	0	0	0	0	0	0	0	.000	.000	.000	
Lance Lynn	2	2	0	0	0	0	0	0	0	.000	.000	.000	
Joe Kelly	1	2	0	0	0	0	0	0	0	.000	.000	.000	

==== Pitching ====
Note: G=Games Played; GS=Games Started; IP=Innings Pitched; H=Hits; BB=Walks; R=Runs; ER=Earned Runs; SO=Strikeouts; W=Wins; L=Losses; SV=Saves; ERA=Earned Run Average

Player	G	GS	IP	H	BB	R	ER	SO	W	L	SV	ERA	Reference
Adam Wainwright	2	2	12	14	2	8	6	14	0	2	0	4.50	
Lance Lynn	2	1	5 2/3	5	4	3	3	5	0	1	0	4.76	
Joe Kelly	1	1	5 1/3	2	3	2	2	6	0	0	0	3.38	
Michael Wacha	2	2	9 2/3	8	8	8	8	11	1	1	0	7.45	
Carlos Martínez	5	0	6	5	1	3	3	5	0	0	0	4.50	
Trevor Rosenthal	4	0	4 2/3	1	1	0	0	9	1	0	1	0.00	
Kevin Siegrist	4	0	3 1/3	2	0	1	1	2	0	0	0	2.70	
John Axford	2	0	2 1/3	0	1	0	0	5	0	0	0	0.00	
Seth Maness	4	0	2 1/3	3	0	2	1	2	0	0	0	3.86	
Randy Choate	4	0	0 2/3	1	1	0	0	0	0	0	0	0.00	

== Broadcasting ==
=== Television ===
Fox televised the series in the United States and Canada, with Joe Buck calling play-by-play and Tim McCarver handling color commentary. This was McCarver's 24th and final World Series broadcast (including four with ABC and four with CBS prior to his joining Fox in 1996), as he had announced that he would retire from the network's lead crew following the season. Working with Buck and McCarver were field reporters Ken Rosenthal and Erin Andrews.

Pregame coverage was handled by host Matt Vasgersian, joined by regular analyst Harold Reynolds. They were joined by special guest analysts A. J. Pierzynski of the Texas Rangers (his third consecutive World Series as a guest analyst), and Jimmy Rollins of the Philadelphia Phillies.

A partnership with Fox Sports featured Pearl Jam as the November artist of month for all entities within the Fox Sports domain and licensed 48 songs from their catalogue to play during the 2013 World Series. The group's music was included in anything from "opening teases and commercial bumpers to montages, as well as additional promotional inventory across Fox prime-time and cable."

Major League Baseball International syndicated the television coverage outside Canada and the U.S., with English-language commentary provided by Baltimore Orioles play-by-play announcer Gary Thorne and ESPN analyst Rick Sutcliffe.

==== Ratings ====
According to Nielsen Media Research, the six-game series on Fox averaged an 8.9 rating and 15 share. The 8.9 rating was, by a large margin, the lowest for a six-game World Series (the 2009 World Series that pulled an 11.7 was the prior lowest) and the fourth lowest overall, behind the 2010, 2008 and 2012 series (the latter holding the record low at 7.6). Game 3, which pulled a 7.4 rating, is the fourth lowest rated MLB World Series game, ahead of just Game 3 of the 2011 World Series (6.6), Game 3 of the 2012 World Series (6.1), and Game 3 of the 2008 World Series (6.1).

Some analysts expressed alarm at the low ratings, considering the prestigious franchises involved (a combined 20 World Championships and 32 pennants). Boston, moreover, had a storybook narrative because of the recent Boston Marathon bombing, which, some felt, should have attracted casual audiences.

Game	Ratings (households)	Share (households)	American audience (in millions)
1	8.6	14	14.5
2	8.3	13	13.4
3	7.4	14	12.5
4	9.4	15	16.0
5	8.9	14	14.5
6	11.3	18	19.2

=== Radio ===
ESPN Radio broadcast the series in the U.S., with commentators Dan Shulman and Orel Hershiser. Locally, the two teams' flagship radio stations broadcast the series with their respective announcing crews. Mike Shannon and John Rooney called the games for the Cardinals on KMOX in St. Louis, while Joe Castiglione, Dave O'Brien, and Lou Merloni announced for the Red Sox on WEEI in Boston.

== Celebration ==
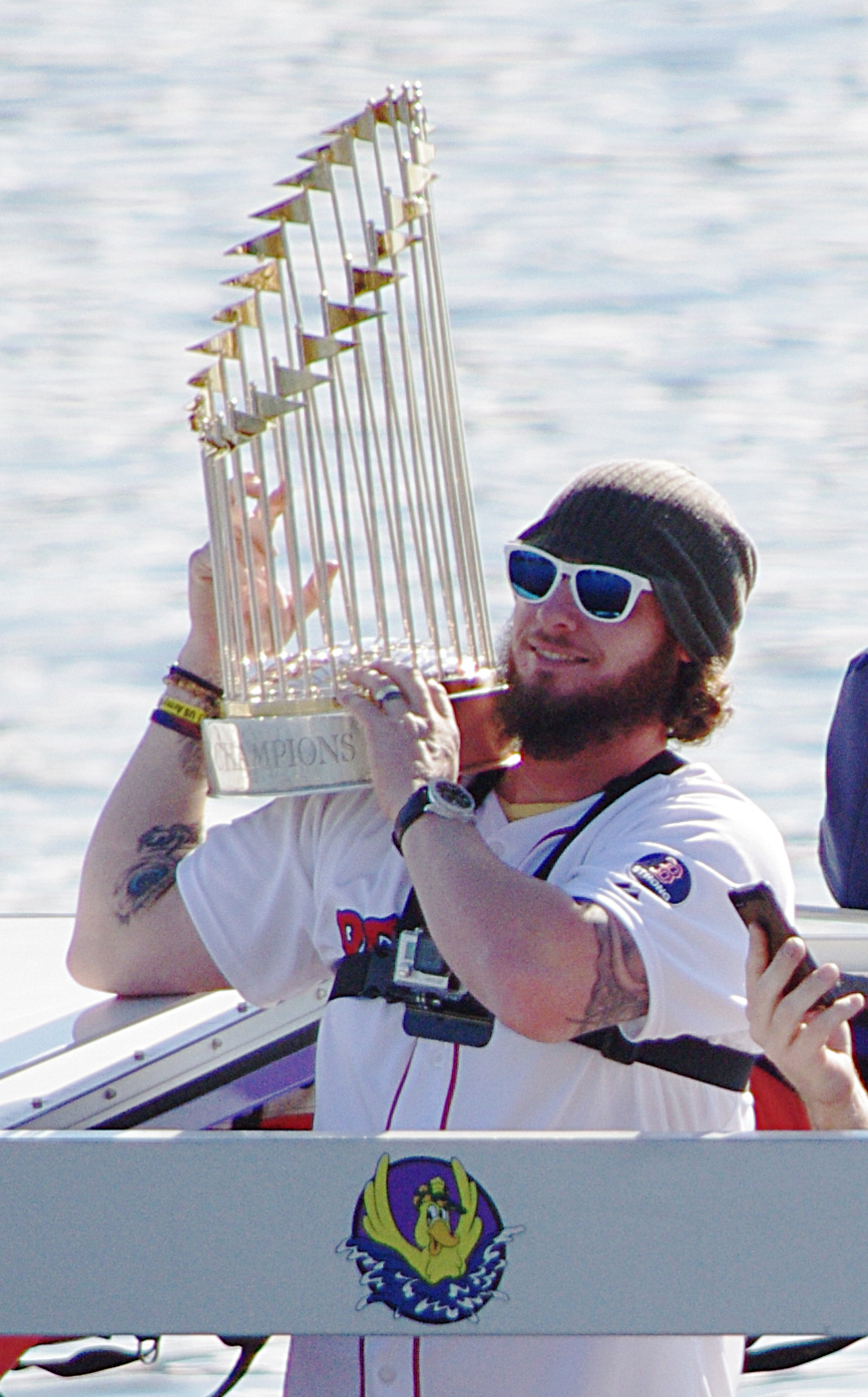
Jarrod Saltalamacchia lifts the Commissioner's Trophy during the victory parade

Following the team's World Series win, Boston Red Sox fans congregated at the site of the Boston Marathon bombing to celebrate the title. The white lights of Boston's Prudential Tower displayed "GO SOX." Red Sox owner John Henry said after the game that the parade would take place on Saturday, November 2.

On November 2, the Red Sox parade began at Fenway Park and headed down Boylston Street. The 25 duck boats carrying the players and executives paused at the Boston Marathon finish line where three spectators died during the April bombing.

On April 1, 2014, the Red Sox visited the White House and met with President Obama.

== Aftermath ==
=== Red Sox ===
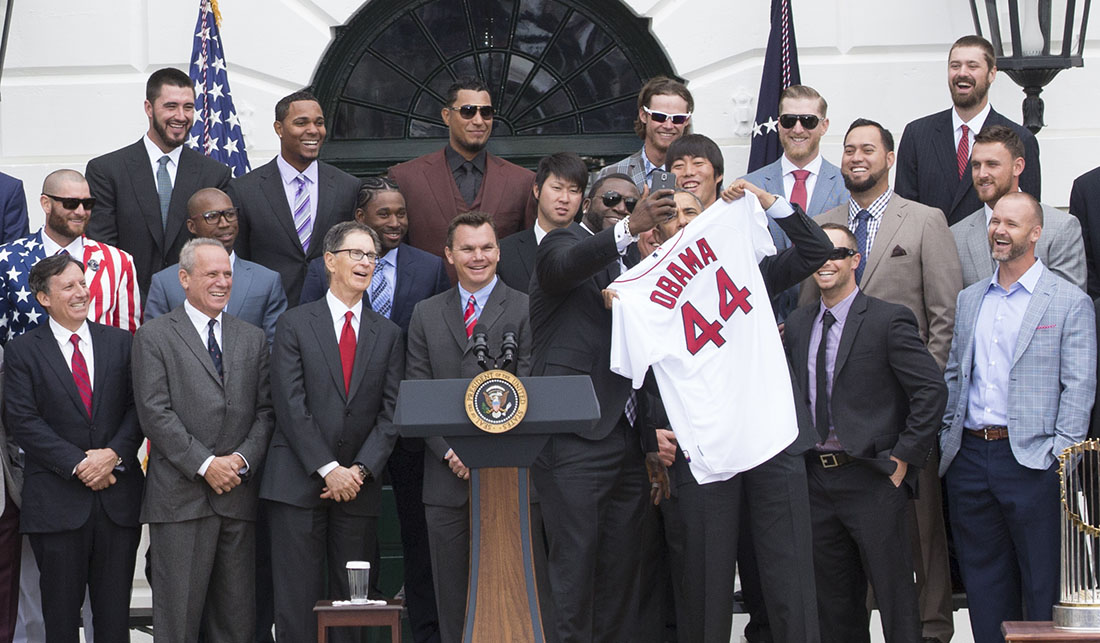
Red Sox at the White House with President Obama on April 1, 2014

The 2013 World Series triumph would be the pinnacle of the John Farrell era. The Red Sox went from first to worst in the AL East following the 2014 season, finishing with a 71–91 record. The next season, they improved their record to 78–84, though still in last place in the AL East. In both 2016 and 2017, the Red Sox finished atop the AL East with identical 93–69 records; however, both seasons ended in the division series, losing to the Cleveland Indians 3–0 in the 2016 ALDS, and the Houston Astros 3–1 in the 2017 ALDS. After the 2017 season, Farrell was fired and replaced by Alex Cora, who managed the Red Sox to the 2018 World Series championship.

The Farrell era oversaw the departure of Ben Cherington and the entry of Dave Dombrowski as general manager, the retirement of David Ortiz following the 2016 season, and the emergence of Mookie Betts, Xander Bogaerts, Andrew Benintendi, Jackie Bradley Jr., Brock Holt, Christian Vázquez, Eduardo Rodríguez and Rafael Devers. All-Star caliber players David Price, JD Martinez, Chris Sale and Craig Kimbrel also joined the team. Those players would form the core of the 2018 champion Red Sox, managed by Alex Cora. However, the Red Sox also signed high-priced free agent flops Pablo Sandoval and Hanley Ramírez, neither of whom became productive players.

Jon Lester, David Ross, John Lackey, Jake Peavy and Franklin Morales would win another World Series with different teams: Peavy with the 2014 Giants, Morales with the 2015 Royals, and Lackey, Lester and Ross with the 2016 Cubs.

=== Cardinals ===
The Cardinals' 2013 World Series appearance was also the pinnacle of the Mike Matheny era. In 2014, the Cardinals made their fourth consecutive NLCS after a 90–72 finish and the NL Central title, but lost to the eventual champion San Francisco Giants 4–1. The following season, they won 100 games to once again clinch the NL Central, but lost to their archrival Chicago Cubs in the NLDS. The Cardinals' 86–76 finish in 2016 and 83–79 finish in 2017 ended without a postseason appearance. Midway through the 2018 season, Matheny was fired and replaced by Mike Shildt. 2013 represents St. Louis last World Series appearance.

Adam Wainwright and Yadier Molina would become life-time Cardinals, never playing for another team in their careers. In 2022, they would set the all-time wins record for a battery with their 203rd victory, passing pitcher Warren Spahn and catcher Del Crandall.

Carlos Beltrán, Joe Kelly and Matt Adams would later win the World Series with different teams: Beltrán with the 2017 Astros, Kelly with the 2018 Red Sox and 2020 Dodgers, and Adams with the 2019 Nationals.

== See also ==
- 2013 Asia Series
- 2013 Japan Series
- 2013 Korean Series
- Cardinals–Red Sox rivalry
