= Junichi Tazawa =

Japanese baseball player (born 1986)

Junichi Tazawa 田澤純一
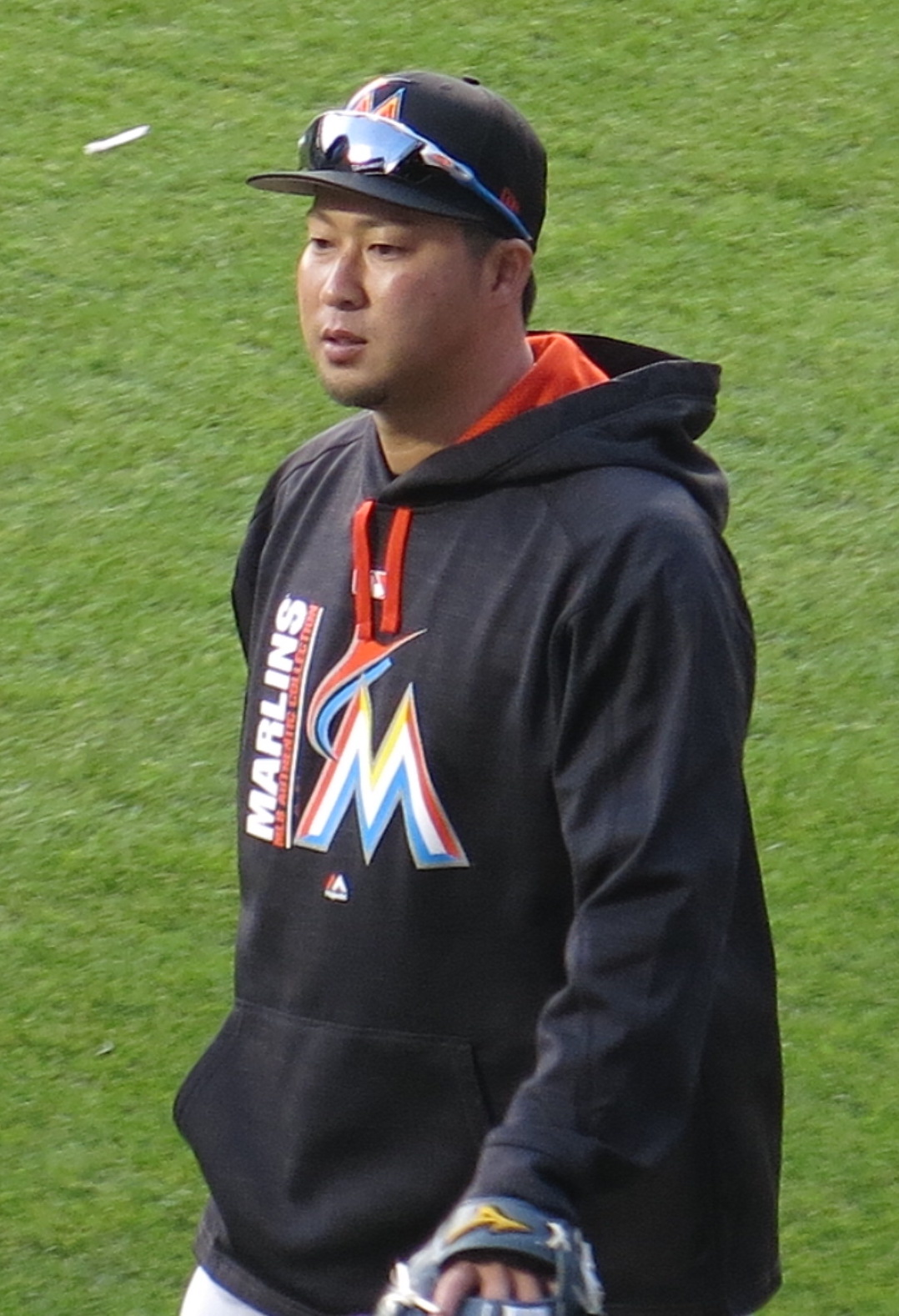
- Tazawa with the Marlins in 2017

Saitama Musashi Heat Bears – No. 36
- Pitcher
- Born: June 6, 1986 (age 40); Kanagawa-ku, Yokohama, Kanagawa, Japan
- Bats: Right Throws: Right

Professional debut
- MLB: August 7, 2009, for the Boston Red Sox
- CPBL: March 17, 2021, for the Wei Chuan Dragons

MLB statistics (through 2018 season)
- Win–loss record: 21–26
- Earned run average: 4.12
- Strikeouts: 374

CPBL statistics (through 2021 season)
- Win–loss record: 4–4
- Earned run average: 3.56
- Strikeouts: 36
- Stats at Baseball Reference

Teams
- Boston Red Sox (2009, 2011–2016); Miami Marlins (2017–2018); Los Angeles Angels (2018); Wei Chuan Dragons (2021)

Career highlights and awards
- World Series champion (2013)

Junichi Tazawa (田澤 純一, Tazawa Jun'ichi; born June 6, 1986) is a Japanese professional baseball pitcher for the Saitama Musashi Heat Bears of the Baseball Challenge League. He also previously played in Major League Baseball (MLB) for the Boston Red Sox, Miami Marlins, and Los Angeles Angels, and in the Chinese Professional Baseball League (CPBL) for the Wei Chuan Dragons.

== Amateur career ==
After he finished his high school career in Yokohama, Tazawa was not drafted by any of Nippon Professional Baseball's 12 teams, and joined the company team of Nippon Oil in the corporate league, unaffiliated with the NPB.

In 2008, Tazawa posted a 10–1 record for Nippon Oil, with a 1.02 earned run average and 95 strikeouts in 88 1/3 innings. In the national corporate league championships, he posted two straight shutouts, the second one a complete game on four hits, 10 strikeouts and zero walks in a 4–0 quarterfinal win over Hitachi. Tazawa appeared less than 24 hours later in a relief appearance in the semifinal against Central Japan Railway. He pitched 2 and 2/3 innings, and allowed three hits, struck out one, and gave up the go-ahead run in a 3–2 loss. Tazawa was the MVP of the championships, with a 4–0 record and 36 strikeouts.

== Professional career ==
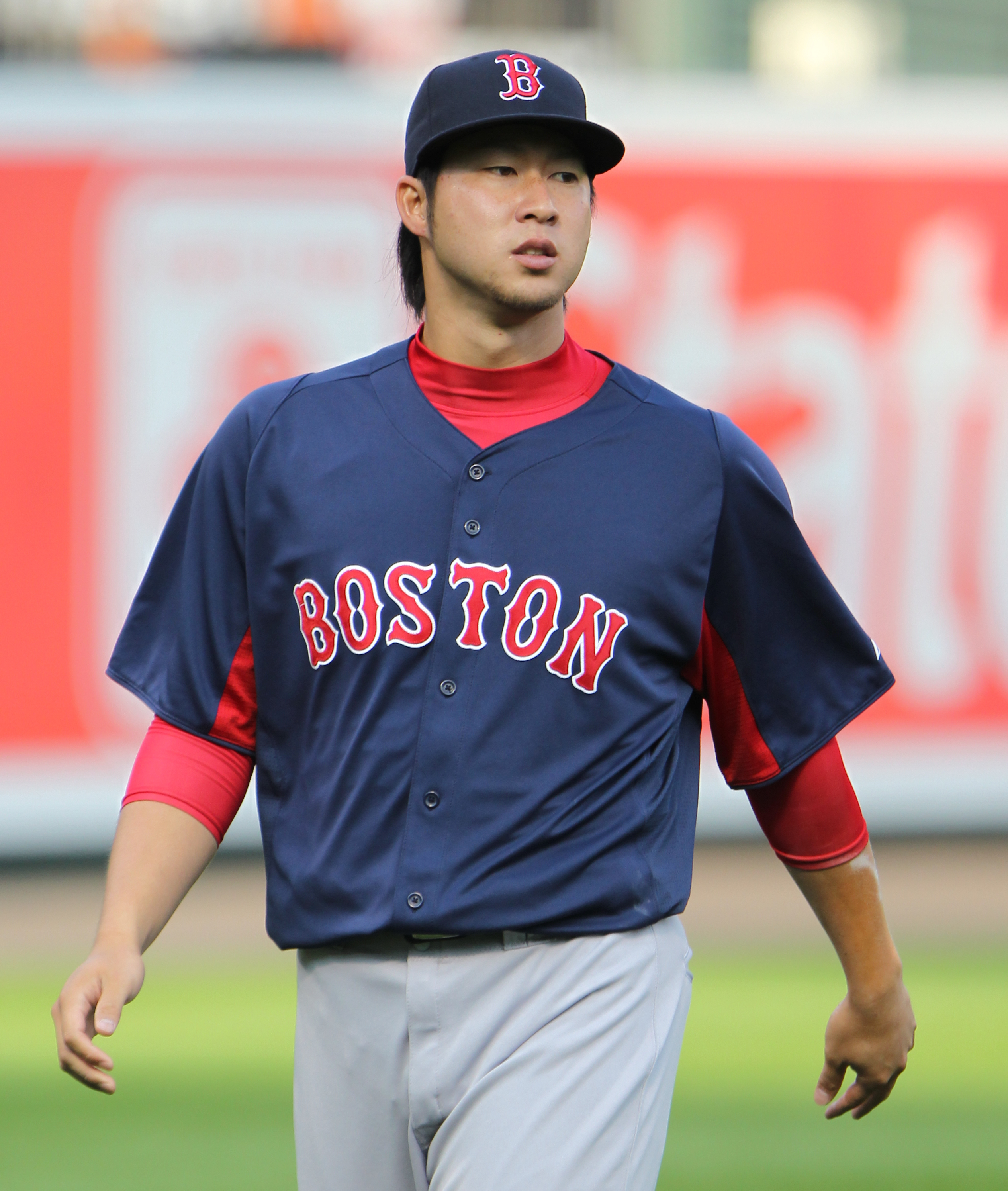
Tazawa with the Red Sox in 2011

In September 2008, Tazawa announced his intention to skip the NPB draft in order to pursue a career with a Major League team. During the 2008 season, his manager Hideaki Okubo encouraged him to attempt a career in Major League Baseball without first playing with a Nippon Professional Baseball team. Had Tazawa joined a Japanese professional team, he would have had to either wait nine years to become a free agent, or to hope that his team would auction the right to negotiate with him through the posting system.

To avoid conflict between Japanese and U.S. teams, Tazawa asked NPB teams not to select him in the October 30 draft, and the 12 teams complied with the request. However, the teams passed a rule requiring any amateur player who signs overseas to sit out two to three years after returning to Japan before they can join a NPB team; high school players would have to sit two years, while college and corporate players three years.

While Tazawa attracted the attention of American scouts, NPB announced that the major leagues of two nations had a gentlemen's agreement against signing Japanese amateurs, and general manager Brian Cashman, whose New York Yankees had a partnership agreement with Yomiuri Giants, said his team considered Tazawa hands off. However, Rob Manfred, MLB’s executive vice president for labor and human resources (and current MLB commissioner) denied that any gentleman's agreement was in place regarding the signing of Japanese amateur players.

=== Boston Red Sox ===
On December 4, 2008, Tazawa signed with the Boston Red Sox, reportedly for $3 million over three years. After his debut on August 7, 2009, he became the third Japanese player, after Mac Suzuki and Kazuhito Tadano, to play in Major League Baseball without first playing professionally in Japan.

On March 22, 2009, Red Sox optioned Tazawa to its AA affiliate, Portland Sea Dogs.

After achieving a record of 9–5 in 18 starts with a 2.57 ERA with Portland, Tazawa was promoted to the AAA Pawtucket Red Sox on July 27, 2009. While in Portland, Tazawa was named to the 2009 Eastern League All Star team, was tied in second for total number of wins, and was tied for third in total strikeouts with 88.

On August 7, 2009, Tazawa was activated from Pawtucket after the Red Sox designated John Smoltz for assignment. He made his debut that night against the New York Yankees in Yankee Stadium in the 14th inning. Tazawa was the last pitcher left in the bullpen for the Red Sox. The first batter he faced was countryman Hideki Matsui, who lined out. In the bottom of the 15th, Tazawa surrendered a two-run walk off home run to Alex Rodriguez.

Tazawa's first major league start was on August 11, 2009, against the Detroit Tigers. In the first inning of the start Tazawa hit Tigers first baseman Miguel Cabrera in the hand while elevating on a fastball, to which Tigers starter Rick Porcello retaliated in trying to throw at Victor Martinez. In the next inning Cabrera was forced to leave the game due to his hand continuing to ail him. The first pitch thrown by Porcello in the bottom of the second inning hit Kevin Youkilis causing him to charge the mound, clearing both the benches and leading to the ejection of Youkilis and Porcello. Tazawa would go on to pitch five innings, winning the game while giving up one earned run and striking out six. With his start, Tazawa became the second youngest Japanese pitcher to start in a major league game. Tazawa's second start came against the Texas Rangers. He pitched five innings, giving up four runs on 10 hits and three walks and taking the loss. In his third start, against the New York Yankees, Tazawa pitched six scoreless innings, allowing eight hits, two walks and striking out two in the win.

In April 2010, Tazawa underwent Tommy John surgery on his right elbow and was knocked out for the entire 2010 season. He began the 2011 season on the 60-day disabled list but eventually returned to pitch in three games for the Red Sox in 2011.

Tazawa started 2012 in Triple-A Pawtucket before being called up to Boston on April 18 to replace the struggling Mark Melancon. Tazawa was optioned back to Triple-A on May 1. Tazawa was one of the rare bright spots in a dismal 2012 season, posting a 1.43 ERA in 44 innings. On April 26, 2012 against the Chicago White Sox, Tazawa tossed three scoreless innings for his first career save.

In May 2013, Tazawa was named interim closer after injuries to Joel Hanrahan and Andrew Bailey. By the end of July he had settled into the primary right-handed setup role ahead of new closer Koji Uehara. He continued in that role through Boston's run to the World Series championship, including pitching important innings in the ALCS and World Series. In 13 postseason appearances, Tazawa allowed only one run. He earned the win in the decisive Game 6 of the ALCS.

On May 1, 2015, New York Yankees Slugger Alex Rodriguez hit a 3–0 93 mph fastball off Tazawa into the seats of Fenway in the eighth inning for his 660th career home run to tie Willie Mays for fourth place on the all time home runs list.

He became a free agent following the 2016 season.

=== Miami Marlins ===
On December 16, 2016, Tazawa signed a two-year, $12 million dollar deal with the Miami Marlins. Tazawa struggled in his first season, going 3-5 with a 5.69 ERA in 55 appearances.

Tazawa was designated for assignment on May 18, 2018, and was released on May 21. He had a 9.00 ERA in 22 appearances at the time of his release.

=== Detroit Tigers ===
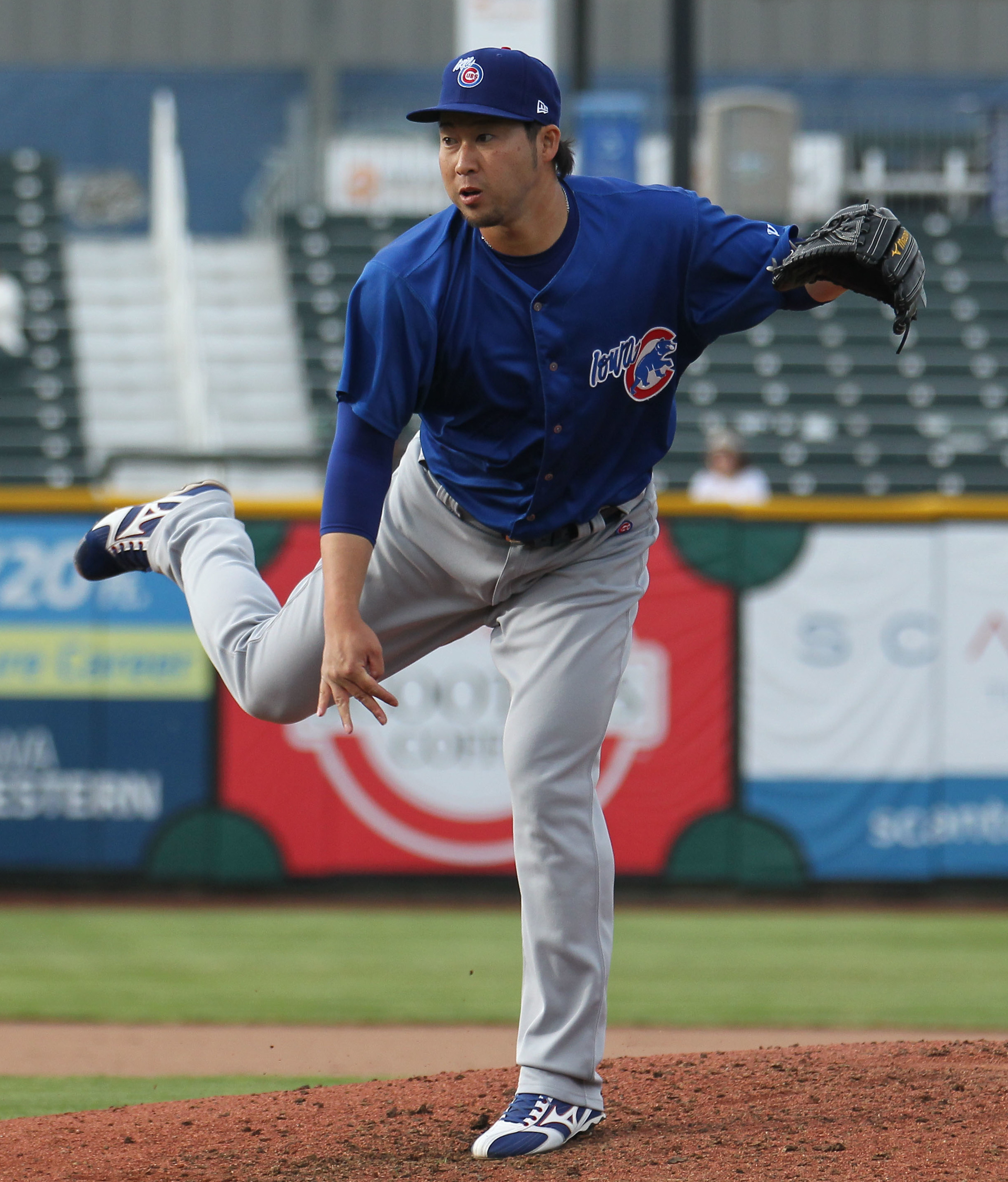
Tazawa with the Iowa Cubs in 2019

On June 3, 2018, Tazawa signed a minor league deal with the Detroit Tigers. On July 9, he was released by the Toledo Mud Hens, the Triple-A affiliate of the Tigers.

=== Los Angeles Angels ===
On July 13, 2018, Tazawa was signed by the Los Angeles Angels on a minor-league contract. He was promoted to the major leagues on September 1, 2018. He became a free agent after the season ended.

=== Chicago Cubs ===
On January 26, 2019, Tazawa signed a minor-league contract with the Chicago Cubs. He was released on March 24. He re-signed with the Cubs on March 26. Tazawa was later released again on July 11.

=== Cincinnati Reds ===
On August 11, 2019, Tazawa signed a minor league contract with the Cincinnati Reds and was assigned to the Double-A Chattanooga Lookouts. He was released by the organization prior to the season on March 10, 2020.

=== Saitama Musashi Heat Bears ===
On July 20, 2020, Tazawa signed with the Saitama Musashi Heat Bears of the Baseball Challenge League.

=== Wei Chuan Dragons ===
On December 26, 2020, Tazawa signed with Taiwan's Wei Chuan Dragons of the Chinese Professional Baseball League for the 2021 season. On March 17, 2021, Tazawa made his CPBL debut.

Tazawa appeared in 58 CPBL games during the season. As the Dragons' Closing Pitcher, he earned 30 saves and an ERA of 3.56. He was not re-signed for the 2022 season and became a free agent.

=== Generales de Durango ===
On May 4, 2022, Tazawa signed with the Generales de Durango of the Mexican League. He was released on June 23. In 13 games 12.2 innings of relief he struggled horribly going 2-1 with a 12.08 ERA with 11 strikeouts and 3 saves.

=== ENEOS ===
On September 7, 2022, Tazawa signed with ENEOS, a team in the semi-pro Japanese Industrial League where he once played. After graduating from high school, Tazawa led ENEOS to the 2008 Intercity Baseball Championship, and won the MVP Hashido Award. While playing in Boston, Tazawa had used his ties to ENEOS to help the Red Sox cash in on a sponsorship deal with the Japanese motor oil company.

=== Saitama Musashi Heat Bears ===
On February 16, 2026, Tazawa signed with the Saitama Musashi Heat Bears of the Baseball Challenge League.

== Pitching style ==
Tazawa has three main pitches that include a 92-95 mph fastball (tops out at 97 mph), a curveball (73–77 mph), and a forkball/splitter (86–88 mph).
