= Seth Maness =

American baseball player (born 1988)

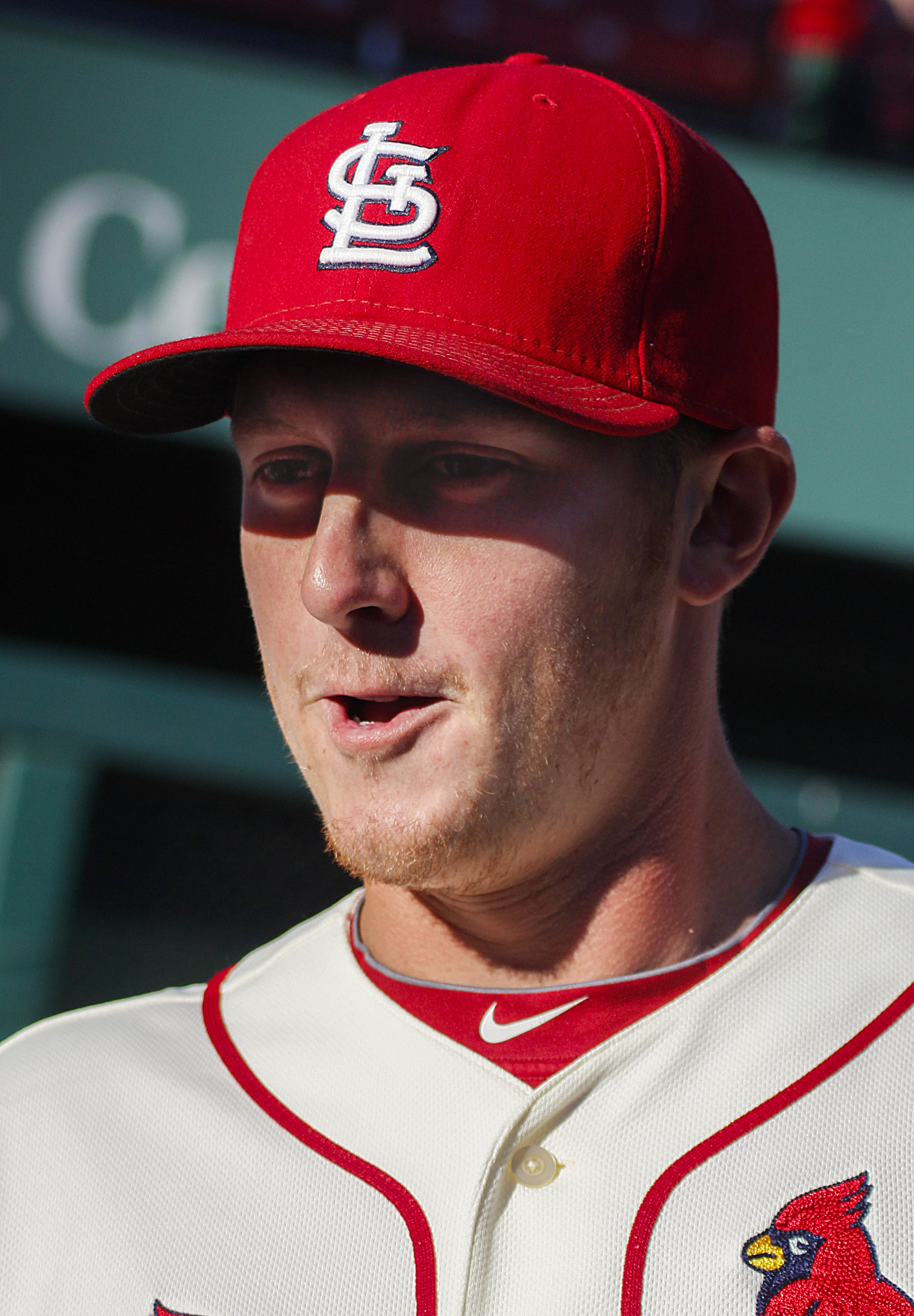
- Maness with the St. Louis Cardinals
- Pitcher
- Born: October 14, 1988 (age 37); Pinehurst, North Carolina, U.S.
- Batted: Right Threw: Right

MLB debut
- May 3, 2013, for the St. Louis Cardinals

Last MLB appearance
- June 4, 2017, for the Kansas City Royals

MLB statistics
- Win–loss record: 18–10
- Earned run average: 3.21
- Strikeouts: 156
- Stats at Baseball Reference

Teams
- St. Louis Cardinals (2013–2016); Kansas City Royals (2017)

Michael Seth Maness (/ˈmeɪnɛs/ MAY-ness; born October 14, 1988) is an American former professional baseball pitcher. He played in Major League Baseball (MLB) for the St. Louis Cardinals and Kansas City Royals.

== Early life and amateur career ==
Maness was born in Pinehurst, North Carolina. The son of Michael Maness and Jan Andrews Benton, he has two siblings—Bailey and Tanner. He attended Pinecrest High School in Southern Pines, North Carolina, where he played for the school's baseball team. As a sophomore, he earned first team All-State and conference Player of the Year honors. His father served as one of his coaches.

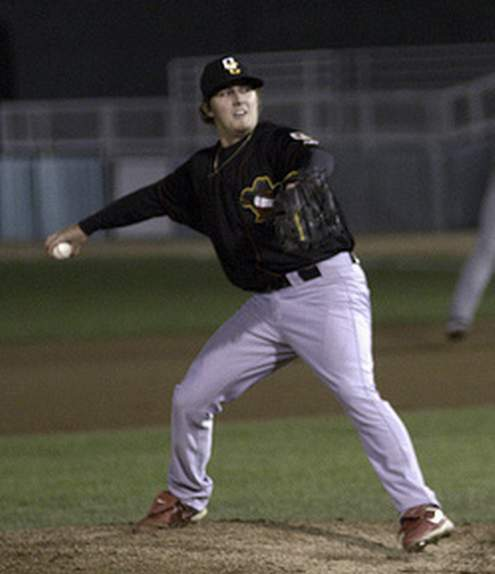
Maness pitching for the Quad Cities River Bandits in 2011

Following high school, Maness enrolled at East Carolina University, majoring in accounting. He played college baseball for the East Carolina Pirates where he became a four-time first team All-Conference USA performer (2008–11). In 2009, he played collegiate summer baseball with the Bourne Braves of the Cape Cod Baseball League. He finished his ECU career as the Pirates career leader in wins (38), strike outs (321), innings pitched (411.2), and games started (61). In 2010 Maness was named Conference USA Pitcher of the Year. The Florida Marlins drafted Maness in the 41st round of the 2010 MLB draft, but he did not sign.

== Professional career ==
=== St. Louis Cardinals ===
The St. Louis Cardinals drafted Maness in the 11th round, with the 350th overall selection, of the 2011 Major League Baseball draft, and he signed with them.

Maness started his professional career with the Batavia Muckdogs of the Low-A New York–Penn League. After appearing in the All-Star Game, the Cardinals promoted him to the Palm Beach Cardinals of the High-A Florida State League. Maness finished the season with the Quad Cities River Bandits of the Single-A Midwest League.

Maness is noted for his control: in 169 2/3 innings pitched in 2012, he allowed only ten walks. Maness was named to the Texas League postseason All-Star team in 2012. On November 30, 2012, Maness was named the Cardinals' Minor League Pitcher of the Year. His efforts on the mound helped the Double-A Springfield Cardinals as they were named Minor League Team of the Year by Baseball America. On April 29, 2013, Maness was called up to the major leagues due to the Cardinals' struggling bullpen.

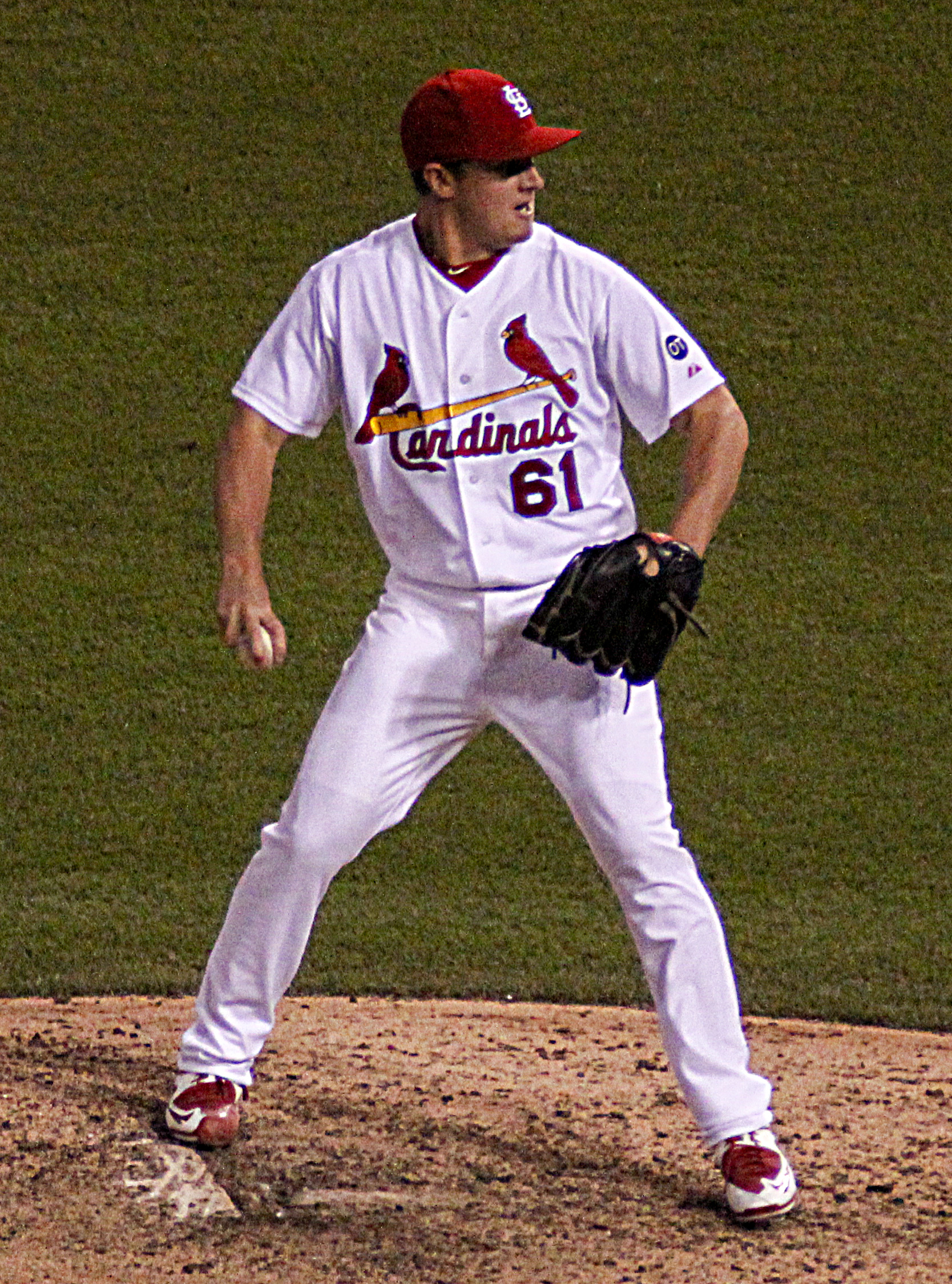
Maness pitching for the Cardinals in 2015

Maness made his MLB debut on May 3. He pitched one inning in his debut, against the Milwaukee Brewers at Miller Park in the eighth inning, giving up no hits, and getting three consecutive groundouts (the third out hit to him) for his debut, following the seventh inning debut of Carlos Martinez who was brought up earlier that day. On May 15, 2013, he became the first Cardinal rookie pitcher since 1900 with three relief wins in his first five major league appearances. In 66 games with St. Louis, Maness went 5–2 with 15 holds, 1 save and a 2.32 ERA, striking out 35 in 62 innings. He led the team in ERA.

Maness pitched five effective innings in the Cardinals postseason run, posting an earned run average of 1.80. The one earned run he surrendered was a three-run home run to Jonny Gomes in Game 4 of the 2013 World Series. The Cardinals would not lead in a World Series game after this home run, falling in six games.

An arbitration-eligible player prior to the 2016 season, Maness and the Cardinals agreed to a one-year, $1.4 million contract on January 15, 2016.

After yielding a 6.39 ERA for the season, and his velocity on all four pitches down 2-3 mph, he landed on the DL for the first time in his career on May 14, after an exam revealed an inflammation on his right (pitching) elbow. He was having pitching difficulties, getting hit hard in his previous 1/3 inning work against the Anaheim Angels on May 12. For the season, he had a 6.39 ERA and 1.97 WHIP in 12 2/3 innings. On August 16, Maness was placed on the disabled list with an elbow strain. It was later revealed that Maness would need to undergo Tommy John surgery, effectively ending his 2016 season and likely for most of the 2017 season. After a medical review of his injury, Maness had surgery on August 18, to fix his Ulnar collateral ligament of elbow joint instead of Tommy John surgery ligament replacement, drastically reducing his recovery time from 12–15 months to 6–8 months, which would make him available for spring training in 2017.

The Cardinals non-tendered him on December 2, 2016, making him a free agent.

=== Kansas City Royals ===
On February 13, 2017, the Kansas City Royals announced that Maness signed a minor league contract, with a $1.25 million incentive for reaching the major leagues. The Royals promoted Maness to the major leagues on May 10. He was designated for assignment on July 1, he cleared waivers and was sent outright to Triple-A Omaha Storm Chasers on July 7. He elected free agency on October 3.

On November 2, 2017, Maness re-signed with the Royals on a minor league contract. He began the 2018 season with Triple-A Omaha, logging a 4.63 ERA with 8 strikeouts across 11 2/3 innings pitched. Maness was released by the Royals organization on May 10, 2018.

=== High Point Rockers ===
On February 7, 2019, Maness signed with the High Point Rockers of the Atlantic League of Professional Baseball. He made one start for the team, getting the win going after 6 innings and giving up 3 hits and 1 earned run (1.50 ERA) with 1 walk with 5 strikeouts.

=== Texas Rangers ===
On May 1, 2019, Maness's contract was purchased by the Texas Rangers and he was assigned to the Triple-A Nashville Sounds. He produced an 8–4 record with a 5.38 ERA over 117 innings for Nashville and was named a 2019 Pacific Coast League All-Star. Maness elected free agency following the season on November 4.

On October 14, 2020, Maness announced his retirement from professional baseball.

== Coaching career ==
In January 2022, Maness joined the UNC Wilmington men's baseball team as the Coordinator of Player Development and spent the entire Spring 2022 season with the Seahawks. On August 18, 2022, Maness was hired by Florida State University as a Graduate Assistant coaching under Link Jarrett, Maness' assistant coach during his collegiate playing career at East Carolina. In July 2023, Maness was hired as the pitching coach at UNC Greensboro.
