= John Farrell (baseball manager) =

American baseball player and manager (born 1962)

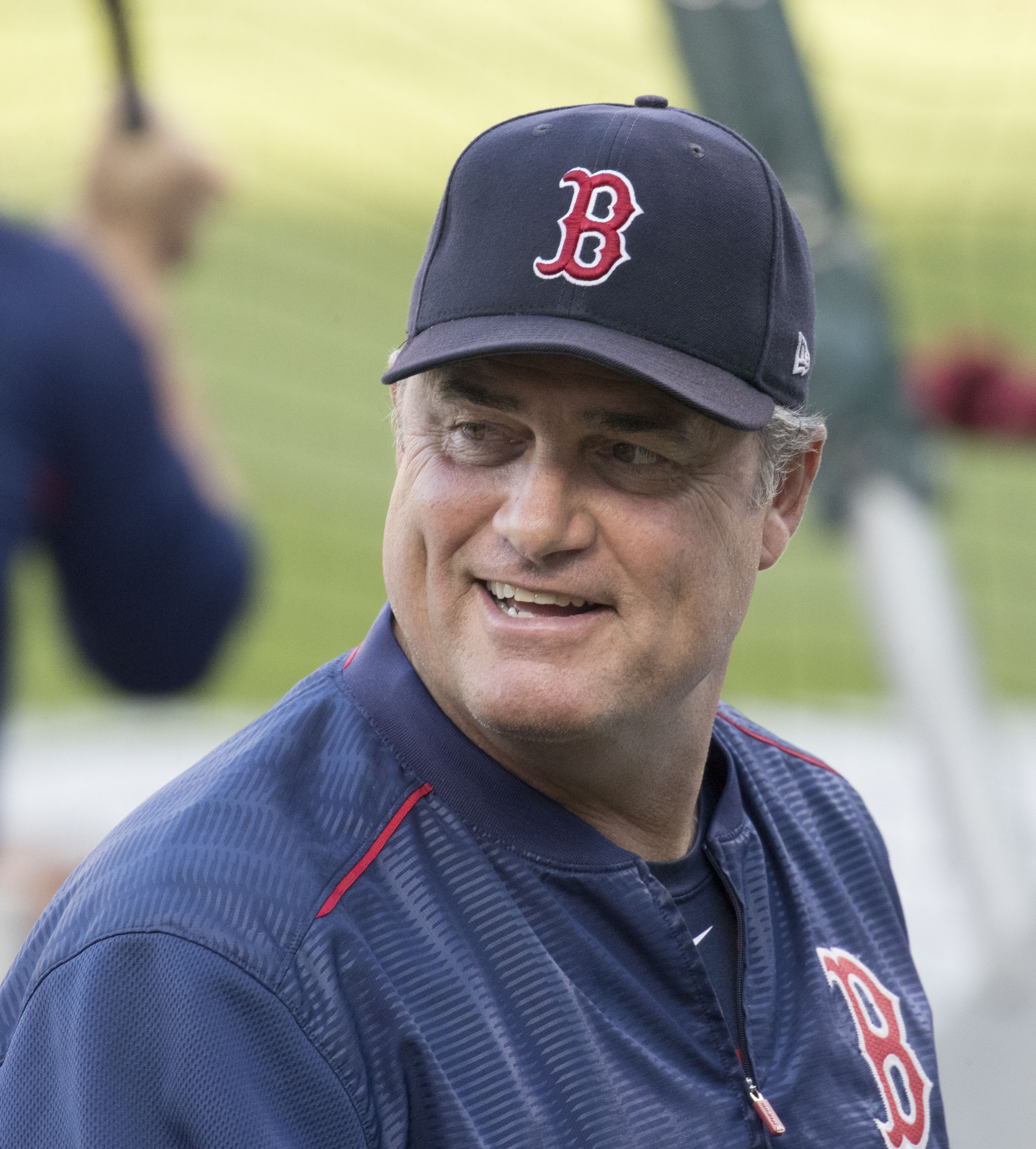
- Farrell with the Boston Red Sox in 2017
- Pitcher / Manager
- Born: August 4, 1962 (age 64); Monmouth Beach, New Jersey, U.S.
- Batted: Right Threw: Right

MLB debut
- August 18, 1987, for the Cleveland Indians

Last MLB appearance
- May 22, 1996, for the Detroit Tigers

MLB statistics
- Win–loss record: 36–46
- Earned run average: 4.56
- Strikeouts: 355
- Managerial record: 586–548
- Winning %: .517
- Stats at Baseball Reference
- Managerial record at Baseball Reference

Teams
- As player: Cleveland Indians (1987–1990); California Angels (1993–1994); Cleveland Indians (1995); Detroit Tigers (1996); As manager: Toronto Blue Jays (2011–2012); Boston Red Sox (2013–2017); As coach: Boston Red Sox (2007–2010)

Career highlights and awards
- 2× World Series champion (2007, 2013)

John Edward Farrell (born August 4, 1962) is an American former professional baseball pitcher, coach, and manager in Major League Baseball (MLB). During his eight-season playing career, Farrell was a member of the Cleveland Indians, California Angels, and Detroit Tigers. He was the pitching coach for the Boston Red Sox from 2007 to 2010, before serving as manager of the Toronto Blue Jays from 2011 to 2012. He returned to the Red Sox as their manager in 2013, winning the World Series with them in his first year, and led the team until 2017. Since 2018, he has held a scouting position with the Cincinnati Reds.

== Playing career ==
=== Amateur ===
Farrell grew up in Monmouth Beach, New Jersey, and was a star pitcher for Shore Regional High School. Upon graduating from high school in 1980, Farrell was drafted by the Oakland Athletics, but he did not sign. He played college baseball for Oklahoma State, where he had a 20–6 record for his four-year career. In 1982, he played collegiate summer baseball with the Hyannis Mets of the Cape Cod Baseball League. After graduating from Oklahoma State, he was drafted by the Cleveland Indians in the second round of the 1984 Draft.

=== Professional ===
Farrell made his major league debut with the Indians on August 18, 1987, playing for them until the 1990 season. He enjoyed success as part of the Cleveland starting rotation, but injuries to his right elbow caused him to miss the entire 1991 and 1992 seasons. He returned to action with the California Angels (1993–94), again with Cleveland (1995), and finished his career with the Detroit Tigers (1996).

== Post-playing career ==
In 1997, Farrell joined his alma mater, Oklahoma State University, as assistant coach and pitching and recruiting coordinator. He remained with the college through 2001.

From November 2001 through the end of the 2006 season, Farrell served as the director of player development for the Cleveland Indians. In 2003 and 2004, the Indians were named MLB Organization of the Year by USA Today's Sports Weekly. In 2003, they were also named as having the top farm system in professional baseball by Baseball America.

Following the 2006 season, the Boston Red Sox hired Farrell as its new pitching coach, replacing Dave Wallace. Farrell rejoined Red Sox manager Terry Francona, as they had been teammates together on the Indians.

=== Toronto Blue Jays ===
During the 2010 off-season, Farrell was rumored to be one of four finalists for the job of manager of Toronto Blue Jays, along with Brian Butterfield, DeMarlo Hale, and Sandy Alomar Jr. The Blue Jays held a press conference on October 25, 2010, formally introducing Farrell as the team's manager for the 2011 season.

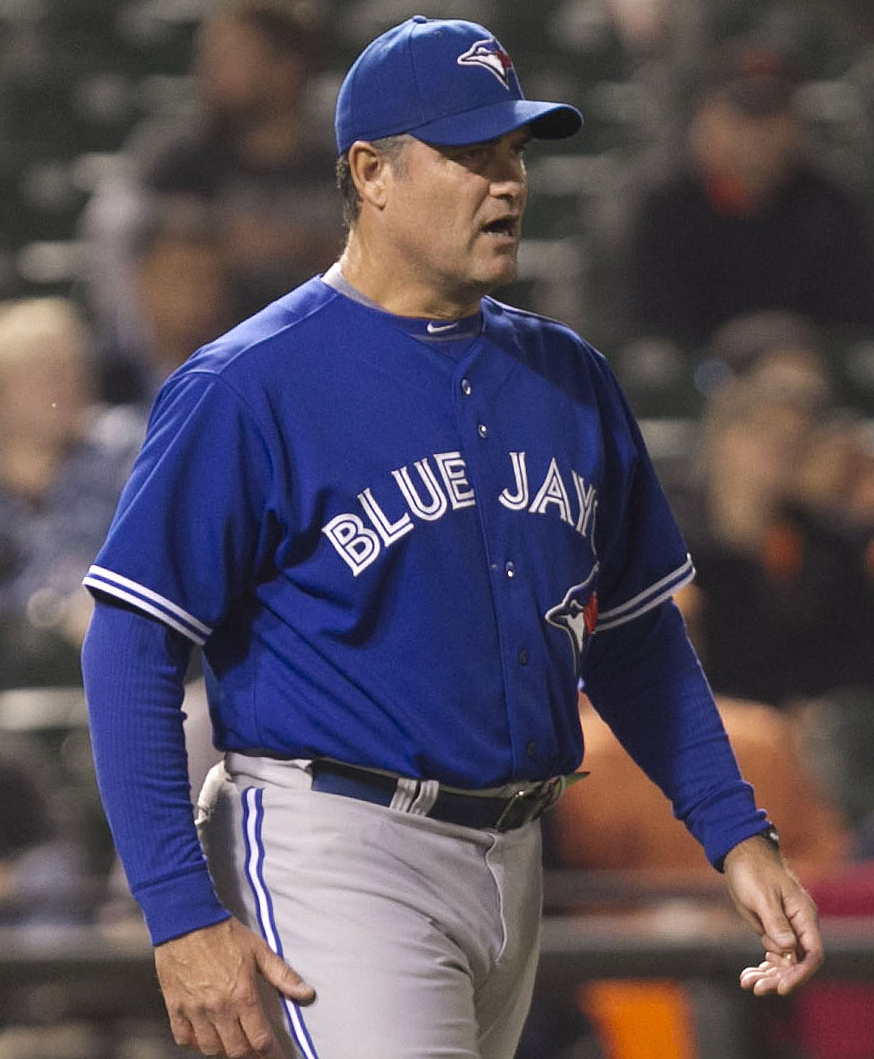
Farrell, during his Blue Jays tenure

Farrell suffered a dislocated jaw while attempting to restrain pitcher Jon Rauch from going after umpire Alfonso Marquez, during a game on July 2, 2011. Both Rauch and Farrell were ejected from the game.

On August 25, 2011, during a home game against the Kansas City Royals, Farrell was forced to leave the dugout in the ninth inning due to a then unknown illness. He was later diagnosed with pneumonia at Mount Sinai Hospital, and was released from the hospital on August 26.

He finished his stint as Toronto Blue Jays manager with a record of 154 wins and 170 losses.

=== Boston Red Sox ===
On October 20, 2012, it was reported that Farrell had asked to be allowed to interview for the manager position with the Boston Red Sox. The next day the Blue Jays officially confirmed Farrell had accepted the manager position with Boston. In the same transaction, Toronto sent pitcher David Carpenter to Boston in exchange for infielder Mike Avilés. On October 22, 2013, Farrell was named Sporting News' 2013 AL Manager of the Year. In 2013, Farrell became the fifth first-year Red Sox manager to win the American League pennant. The Red Sox subsequently went on to win the 2013 World Series, going from worst to first under Farrell in just a year's time. It was also the first time in 95 years that the Red Sox won the Series at home, the last time being the 1918 World Series. However, the team struggled during Farrell's second year as manager and subsequently finished last in their division. Farrell accepted responsibility for their poor performance and also attributed their problems to inconsistencies in their offense.

Farrell's 2015 season was cut short in August when he was diagnosed with lymphoma and forced to seek treatment. By the time of his departure, the Red Sox's struggles were continuing and they again found themselves in last place in their division, where they ultimately finished for the second year in a row. Nevertheless, it was announced that Farrell would return as the Red Sox's manager in 2016.

The 2016 season was an improvement for Farrell and the Red Sox, who finished at the top of their division and returned to the playoffs. However, the team would be swept in the American League Division Series against the Cleveland Indians, led by their former manager Terry Francona, under whom Farrell had previously served.

The Red Sox again finished at the top of their division under Farrell in the 2017 season, but were also eliminated in the divisional round for a second consecutive year, this time against the Houston Astros. On October 11, 2017, the Red Sox announced Farrell's termination after serving five years as manager.

=== Cincinnati Reds ===
In March 2018, the Reds announced that Farrell had joined their organization as a scout, his role to be "evaluating the club's system and also serving on special assignments".

=== Managerial records ===
As of games played on October 9, 2017.

| Team | Year | Regular season | | | | | Postseason | | | |
| Team | Year | Games | Won | Lost | Win % | Finish | Won | Lost | Win % | Result |
|---|---|---|---|---|---|---|---|---|---|---|
| TOR | 2011 | 162 | 81 | 81 | .500 | 4th in AL East | – | – | – | – |
| TOR | 2012 | 162 | 73 | 89 | .451 | 4th in AL East | – | – | – | – |
| TOR total | | 324 | 154 | 170 | .475 | | 0 | 0 | – | |
| BOS | 2013 | 162 | 97 | 65 | .599 | 1st in AL East | 11 | 5 | .688 | Won World Series (STL) |
| BOS | 2014 | 162 | 71 | 91 | .438 | 5th in AL East | – | – | – | – |
| BOS | 2015 | 162 | 78 | 84 | .481 | 5th in AL East | – | – | – | – |
| BOS | 2016 | 162 | 93 | 69 | .574 | 1st in AL East | 0 | 3 | .000 | Lost ALDS (CLE) |
| BOS | 2017 | 162 | 93 | 69 | .574 | 1st in AL East | 1 | 3 | .250 | Lost ALDS (HOU) |
| BOS total | | 810 | 432 | 378 | .533 | | 12 | 11 | .522 | |
| Total | | 1134 | 586 | 548 | .517 | | 12 | 11 | .522 | |

== Broadcasting ==
In March 2018, it was announced that Farrell would join ESPN's Baseball Tonight as an analyst, in time for the start of the regular season. He has also appeared as an analyst on Fox Major League Baseball during the 2019 season.

== Personal life ==
Farrell's father, Tom, pitched in the Cleveland Indians farm system in the 1950s until an injury ended his baseball career.

As of the 2019 baseball season, Farrell spends 10 days a month working as a minor league pitching scout for the Cincinnati Reds, and at other times works lobster fishing near Ipswich, Massachusetts, on his boat Seaweed.

Farrell has three sons, all of whom were selected in the MLB draft. Jeremy, an infielder, played college baseball at Virginia, then was in the Pittsburgh Pirates minor league system from 2008 through 2012, and in the Chicago White Sox system from 2013 through 2015. Shane, a right-handed pitcher out of Marshall, was taken in the 46th round by the Toronto Blue Jays in 2011, and then worked for the Chicago Cubs in their baseball operations department. His youngest, Luke, a Northwestern right-hander, was selected by the Kansas City Royals in the sixth round of the 2013 draft and has pitched in MLB for the Royals, Reds, Cubs and Twins. In 2018, two of Farrell's sons worked in the Cubs organization: Shane as an area scout, Jeremy as the Assistant Director of Baseball Development. Shane was named Amateur Scouting Director for the Blue Jays before the 2020 season.

Sporting positions
| Preceded by Dave Wallace | Boston Red Sox pitching coach 2007–2010 | Succeeded by Curt Young |
