= TicketIQ =

Event ticket search engine

- Company type: Private
- Website type: Ticket Search
- Available in: English
- Headquarters: New York, New York, United States
- Area served: Worldwide
- Creator: Jesse Lawrence
- Employees: 15
- Website: www.ticketiq.com
- Launched: July 4, 2010
- Current status: Active

TicketIQ (known as TiqIQ until August 2016) is a no-fee event ticket search engine, aggregator and mobile app which provides ticket-buying options from many different secondary ticket market and main market ticket sellers, including Ticketmaster, Eventbrite, SeatGeek and Telecharge. The company works directly with teams, leagues, festivals and venues to sell tickets direct-to-fan using paid social and other programmatic media platforms.

== History ==
On July 4, 2010, TiqIQ was launched by CEO Jesse Lawrence. TiqIQ has its headquarters in New York City and has 25 employees.

On August 26, 2016, the company rebranded as TicketIQ.

In 2020, the company launched FanIQ, an identity-management and marketing platform for sports teams, festivals and venues.

== Funding ==
Business Insider reported in 2013 that New York based software company MediaMath invested in TiqIQ.

VentureBeat reported that TiqIQ raised venture capital from iNovia Capital and Contour Venture partners.

TiqIQ has been called "The Kayak of Live-Event Tickets" because it aggregates ticket deals from StubHub, TicketsNow, eBay and other companies, much like Kayak.com aggregates travel deals.
