= Stephen Drew =

American baseball player (born 1983)

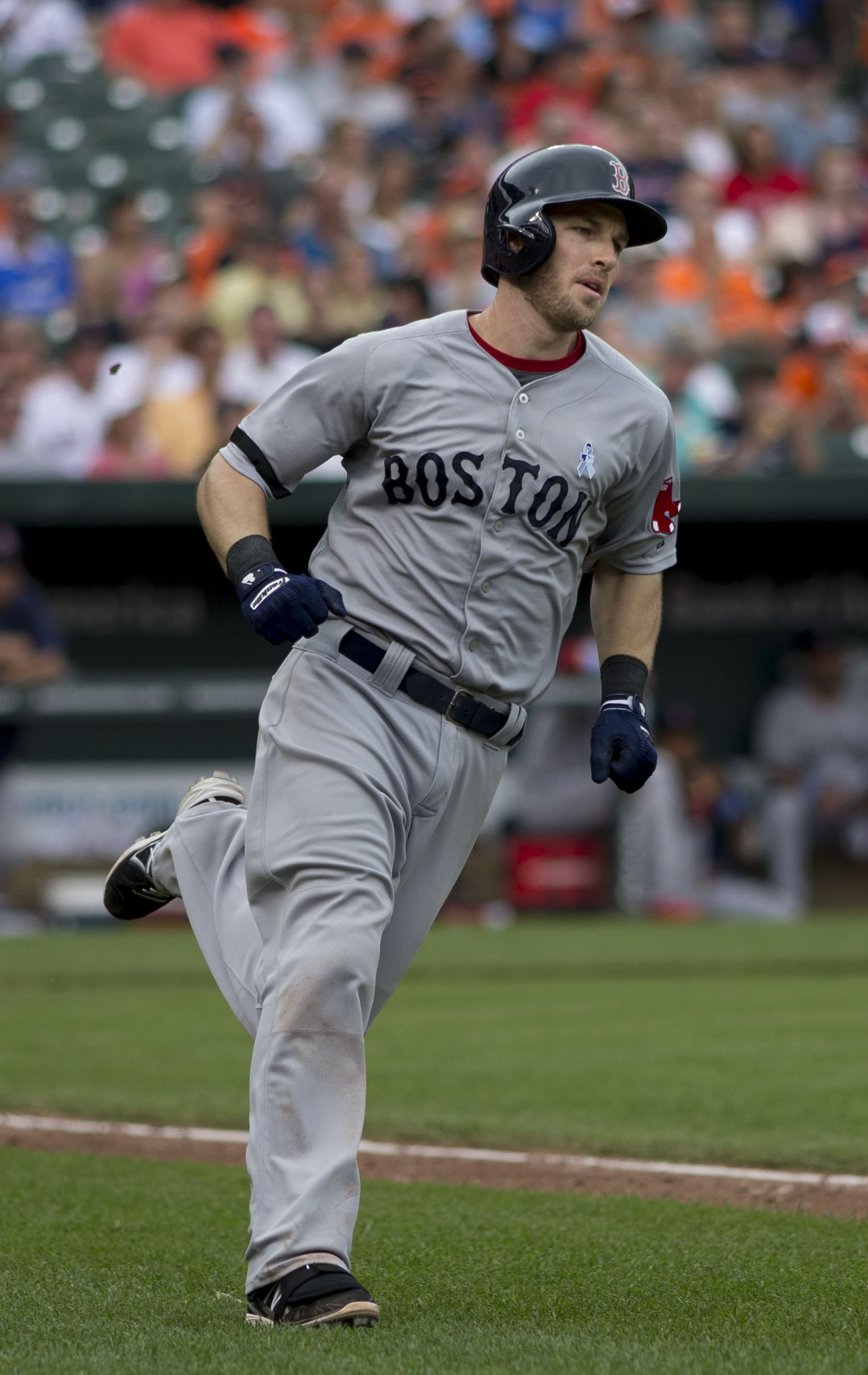
- Drew with the Boston Red Sox in 2013
- Shortstop
- Born: March 16, 1983 (age 43); Hahira, Georgia, U.S.
- Batted: Left Threw: Right

MLB debut
- July 15, 2006, for the Arizona Diamondbacks

Last MLB appearance
- July 25, 2017, for the Washington Nationals

MLB statistics
- Batting average: .252
- Home runs: 123
- Runs batted in: 524
- Stats at Baseball Reference

Teams
- Arizona Diamondbacks (2006–2012); Oakland Athletics (2012); Boston Red Sox (2013–2014); New York Yankees (2014–2015); Washington Nationals (2016–2017)

Career highlights and awards
- World Series champion (2013)

Stephen Oris Drew (born March 16, 1983) is an American former professional baseball infielder. He played 12 seasons in Major League Baseball (MLB) for the Arizona Diamondbacks, Oakland Athletics, Boston Red Sox, New York Yankees and Washington Nationals. His two brothers, outfielder J.D. and pitcher Tim, also played in MLB.

== Amateur career ==
Drew went to Lowndes High School in Valdosta, Georgia. He was drafted by the Pittsburgh Pirates in the 11th round of the 2001 draft but did not sign. Following in the footsteps of his brother, J. D., he enrolled at Florida State University and played college baseball for the Florida State Seminoles baseball team.

== Professional career ==
=== Arizona Diamondbacks ===
==== Minor leagues ====
The Arizona Diamondbacks selected Drew in the first round, with the 15th overall selection, of the 2004 Major League Baseball draft. While coming to an agreement on his rookie contract, Drew briefly played for the Camden Riversharks of the Atlantic League, where he hit .427 in 19 games. He began the 2006 season with the Lancaster JetHawks of the High-A California League, where he batted .389 and hit 10 home runs. Drew was later promoted to the Tennessee Smokies of the Double-A Southern League, with whom he hit .218 and hit four home runs. He was then promoted to the Tucson Sidewinders of the Triple-A Pacific Coast League. Drew was selected to the 2006 All-Star Futures Game.

==== Major leagues ====
On July 13, 2006, during a game against the Milwaukee Brewers, Craig Counsell injured his ribs, prompting the call-up of Drew from the Diamondbacks' Triple-A affiliate, the Tucson Sidewinders. He made his major league debut on July 15 against the Milwaukee Brewers. Also making his major league debut that day (with the Brewers) was Tony Gwynn Jr., son of former major leaguer Tony Gwynn. Drew recorded his first major league hit against the Los Angeles Dodgers and his brother J. D. Drew. He finished the season batting .316, with five home runs and 23 RBI.

In 2007, although the Diamondbacks were division champions, Drew had a disappointing season, hitting only .238 with 12 home runs but a career-high nine stolen bases.

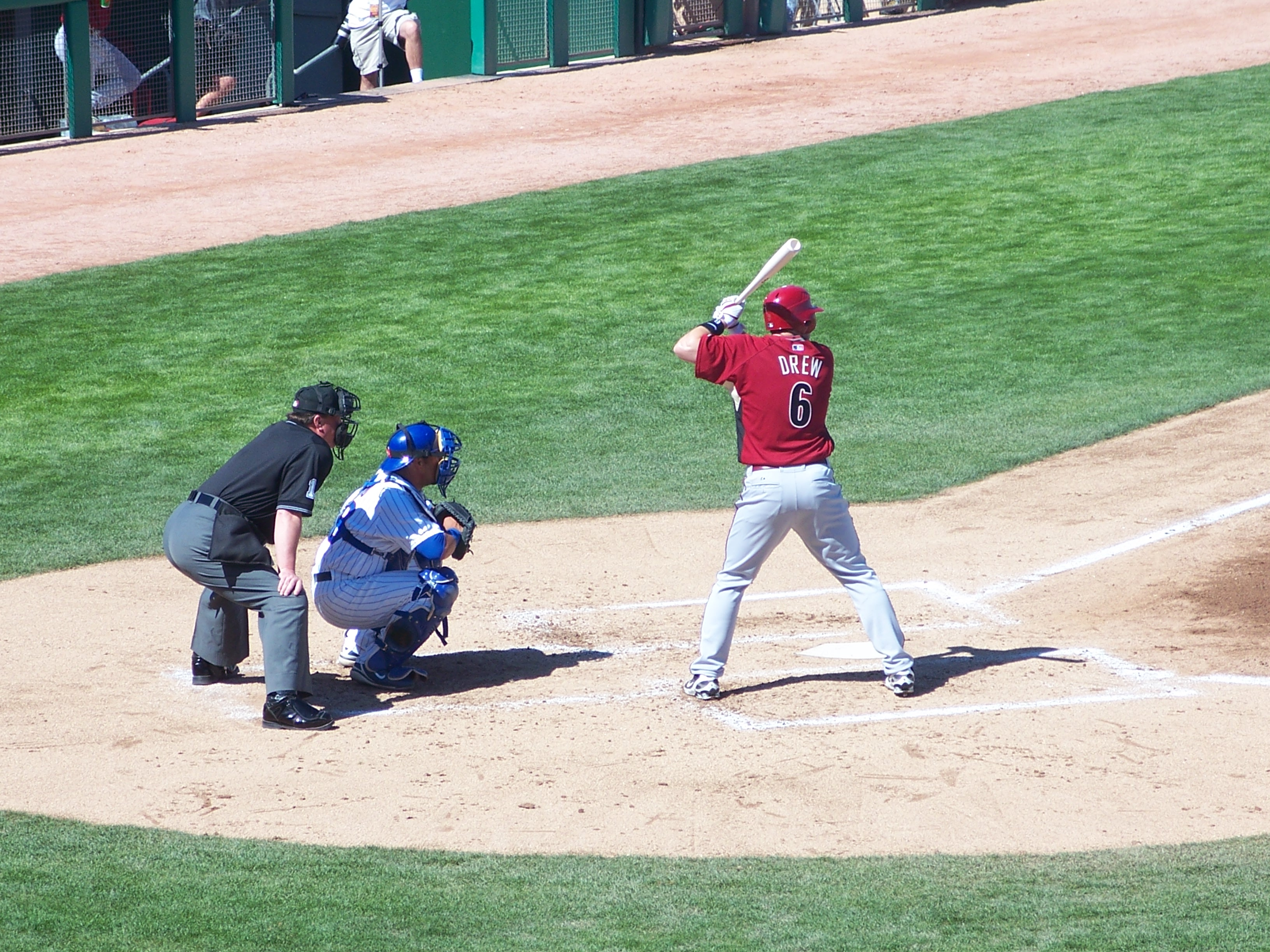
Drew batting with the Arizona Diamondbacks in 2008 spring training

On September 1, 2008, he hit for the cycle against the St. Louis Cardinals, becoming the first player to do so at Chase Field. Batting leadoff, Drew singled in the first inning, tripled in the third and homered in the fifth against Cardinal starter Joel Piñeiro. He added a ground-rule double in the seventh against reliever Kyle McClellan. He was the fourth to hit for the cycle in 2008, and on the same day Adrián Beltré of the Seattle Mariners became the fifth. This was the first time that two players had hit for the cycle on the same day since 1920. He finished the season batting .291, with a career-high 21 home runs.

In 2009, he hit .261 with 12 home runs and a career-high 12 triples, tied with Michael Bourn for the second most in the National League that year.

On Opening Day, April 5, 2010, he hit an inside-the-park home run against starter Jon Garland, the sixth Diamondback to do so. He finished that year batting .278, with 15 home runs and 61 RBI.

In 2011, Drew missed the first four games of the season due to abdominal pain. On July 20, 2011, he slid into home plate, fractured his right ankle and missed the rest of the season, batting .252 for the year with 5 home runs and 45 RBI. He played in only 86 games that season, fewer than in any season after the 59 games of his rookie year.

He spent early 2012 on the disabled list for the broken ankle until June 27, when he played for the first time in over 11 months, going one for four. He was linked to various teams at the 2012 trade deadline, including the Detroit Tigers and Oakland Athletics. On July 30, manager Kirk Gibson called Drew into his office for a closed-door meeting; speculation that Drew had been traded ensued. In the 40 games he played with the Diamondbacks that season, Drew batted with just a .193 batting average, 2 home runs, and 12 RBI.

Over the course of nearly 7 seasons with the Diamondbacks, Drew would compile a team record 52 triples.

=== Oakland Athletics ===
On August 20, 2012, Drew was traded to the Oakland Athletics for minor league shortstop Sean Jamieson. Drew finished 2012 hitting .223 in 79 games with 7 home runs and 28 RBI. The A's declined their $10 million option on Drew on October 29, making him a free agent. Drew obtained a $1.35 million buyout.

=== Boston Red Sox ===
On December 17, 2012, Drew signed a one-year, $9.5 million contract with the Boston Red Sox, which also included $500,000 in performance bonuses. Drew had a .253 batting average, 13 home runs, and 67 RBI in the 2013 regular season. After struggling at the plate for most of the 2013 postseason, Drew homered in the decisive Game 6 of the World Series, helping the Red Sox clinch their third championship in nine years and earning his first career World Series ring.

Drew opted to become a free agent after the 2013 season, and turned down Boston's qualifying offer of $14.1 million for the 2014 season. Under the terms of the CBA, teams signing free agents who had declined a qualifying offer would forfeit their top unprotected pick in the following draft. One effect of this was to reduce the market value of free agents who had received a qualifying offer. By the start of the 2014 season Drew remained unsigned, and baseball analysts attributed it partly to few teams needing a veteran starting shortstop and partly to teams not being willing to give up a top draft pick. After having missed spring training and the start of the regular season, on May 20, 2014, Drew signed a one-year, $10 million contract with Boston, a prorated amount of the $14.1 million qualifying offer he previously rejected. In 39 games he played in for the Red Sox that year, Drew hit 4 home runs, 11 RBI, and had a low batting average of just .176.

=== New York Yankees ===
On July 31, 2014, Drew was traded to the New York Yankees by the Boston Red Sox for Kelly Johnson. It was the first trade between the teams since 1997. Drew batted .150 with 3 home runs and 15 RBI in 46 games for the Yankees. At the end of the 2014 season, Drew's batting average was just .162 with 7 home runs and 26 RBI in a total of 85 games.

Drew became a free agent after the 2014 season, and re-signed with the Yankees on January 6, 2015, agreeing to a one-year, $5 million contract. The deal became official on January 16. On April 17, 2015, Drew hit his 100th career home run in a game against the Tampa Bay Rays. On June 9, 2015, Drew recorded his 1,000th career hit, a home run, against the Washington Nationals. Drew had a .201 batting average, 17 home runs (4 shy of his career high), and 44 RBIs during the 2015 season.

=== Washington Nationals ===
On January 6, 2016, Drew signed a one-year, $3 million contract with the Washington Nationals. He appeared in 70 games for Washington in 2016, and hit .266 with eight home runs and 21 RBI. Drew signed a one-year, $3.5 million contract with the Nationals on January 26, 2017. On April 12, 2017, the Nationals placed Drew on the 10-day disabled list due to a right hamstring issue.

=== Retirement ===
On April 2, 2018, Drew confirmed his retirement from baseball after 12 seasons.

== Personal life ==
Drew is a Christian. Drew's father found his first baseball glove in a dumpster. The Drew brothers are the only trio of siblings all selected in the first round of the Major League Baseball draft.

Drew and Washington Nationals teammate Chris Heisey established a close friendship during the 2016 season, becoming the de facto leaders of a group of bench players they dubbed the "Wolfpack".

== See also ==
- List of Major League Baseball players to hit for the cycle

Achievements
Preceded by Cristian Guzmán	Hitting for the cycle September 1, 2008	Succeeded by Adrián Beltré
