= 2013 Pittsburgh Pirates season =

Major League Baseball season

2013 Pittsburgh Pirates
- National League Wild Card winners
- League: National League
- Division: Central
- Ballpark: PNC Park
- City: Pittsburgh, Pennsylvania
- Record: 94–68 (.580)
- Divisional place: 2nd
- Owners: Bob Nutting
- General managers: Neal Huntington
- Managers: Clint Hurdle
- Television: Root Sports Pittsburgh
- Radio: KDKA-FM; Pittsburgh Pirates Radio Network (Steve Blass, Greg Brown, Tim Neverett, Bob Walk, John Wehner)
- Stats: ESPN.com; Baseball Reference

The 2013 Pittsburgh Pirates season was the franchise's 127th season as a member of the National League, 132nd season overall, and 13th season at PNC Park. The regular season began at home with a loss against the Chicago Cubs on April 1 and ended with a win at Great American Ball Park against the Cincinnati Reds on September 29. In their first winning season since 1992, the Pirates finished in second place in the National League Central with 94 wins and 68 losses. They advanced to the NLDS before losing to the eventual NL champion St. Louis Cardinals.

== Background ==
The Pirates earned their 82nd win of the season on September 9, ensuring the team's first winning season since 1992 and ending the longest stretch of losing seasons—20—in North American professional sports history. Although the St. Louis Cardinals won the NL Central Division, the Pirates clinched a playoff berth for the first time since 1992 in one of two NL Wild Card spots on September 23. In the NLWC Game, the Pirates secured their first postseason win since Game 6 of the 1992 NLCS by defeating the Cincinnati Reds. In doing so, the team advanced to the NLDS, where they were defeated in five games by the eventual National League champion Cardinals, eliminating them from the 2013 postseason.

Five members of the 2013 Pirates were selected to represent the National League in the All-Star Game. In addition, team manager Clint Hurdle won the 2013 NL Manager of the Year Award in his third year with the Pirates, center fielder Andrew McCutchen was named NL Most Valuable Player, pitcher Francisco Liriano was named NL Comeback Player of the Year, and third baseman Pedro Álvarez tied for first place in home runs hit in the National League at 36.

== Season standings ==
=== National League Central ===
NL Central
Team	W	L	Pct.	GB	Home	Road
St. Louis Cardinals	97	65	.599	—	54‍–‍27	43‍–‍38
Pittsburgh Pirates	94	68	.580	3	50‍–‍31	44‍–‍37
Cincinnati Reds	90	72	.556	7	49‍–‍31	41‍–‍41
Milwaukee Brewers	74	88	.457	23	37‍–‍44	37‍–‍44
Chicago Cubs	66	96	.407	31	31‍–‍50	35‍–‍46

=== National League playoff standings ===
Division winners
Team	W	L	Pct.
St. Louis Cardinals	97	65	.599
Atlanta Braves	96	66	.593
Los Angeles Dodgers	92	70	.568

Wild Card teams (Top 2 teams qualify for postseason)
Team	W	L	Pct.	GB
Pittsburgh Pirates	94	68	.580	+4
Cincinnati Reds	90	72	.556	—
Washington Nationals	86	76	.531	4
Arizona Diamondbacks	81	81	.500	9
San Francisco Giants	76	86	.469	14
San Diego Padres	76	86	.469	14
Colorado Rockies	74	88	.457	16
New York Mets	74	88	.457	16
Milwaukee Brewers	74	88	.457	16
Philadelphia Phillies	73	89	.451	17
Chicago Cubs	66	96	.407	24
Miami Marlins	62	100	.383	28

=== Record vs. opponents ===
2013 National League record Source: MLB Standings Grid – 2013
Team	AZ	ATL	CHC	CIN	COL	LAD	MIA	MIL	NYM	PHI	PIT	SD	SF	STL	WSH	AL
Arizona	—	2–4	4–3	3–4	12–7	10–9	4–2	6–1	3–4	3–4	3–3	7–12	7–12	4–3	2–4	11–9
Atlanta	4–2	—	5–1	4–3	6–1	5–2	13–6	2–4	10–9	11–8	4–3	1–5	3–4	4–3	13–6	11–9
Chicago	3–4	1–5	—	5–14	3–3	1–6	4–3	6–13	3–3	3–3	7–12	3–4	4–3	7–12	3–4	13–7
Cincinnati	4–3	3–4	14–5	—	2–4	4–3	6–1	10–9	4–2	4–2	8–11	3–3	6–1	8–11	3–4	11–9
Colorado	7–12	1–6	3–3	4–2	—	10–9	3–4	4–2	3–4	3–4	4–2	12–7	9–10	3–4	3–4	5–15
Los Angeles	9–10	2–5	6–1	3–4	9–10	—	5–2	4–2	5–1	5–2	4–2	11–8	8–11	4–3	5–1	12–8
Miami	2–4	6–13	3–4	1–6	4–3	2–5	—	1–5	11–8	7–12	2–4	3–4	4–3	2–4	5–14	9–11
Milwaukee	1–6	4–2	13–6	9–10	2–4	2–4	5–1	—	4–3	5–2	7–12	3–4	5–2	5–14	3–4	6–14
New York	4–3	9–10	3–3	2–4	4–3	1–5	8–11	3–4	—	10–9	2–5	4–3	4–2	2–5	7–12	11–9
Philadelphia	4–3	8–11	3–3	2–4	4–3	2–5	12–7	2–5	9–10	—	3–4	4–2	3–3	2–5	8–11	7–13
Pittsburgh	3–3	3–4	12–7	11–8	2–4	2–4	4–2	12–7	5–2	4–3	—	3–4	4–3	10–9	4–3	15–5
San Diego	12–7	5–1	4–3	3–3	7–12	8–11	4–3	4–3	3–4	2–4	4–3	—	8–11	2–4	2–5	8–12
San Francisco	12–7	4–3	3–4	1–6	10–9	11–8	3–4	2–5	2–4	3–3	3–4	11–8	—	2–4	3–3	6–14
St. Louis	3–4	3–4	12–7	11–8	4–3	3–4	4–2	14–5	5–2	5–2	9–10	4–2	4–2	—	6–0	10–10
Washington	4–2	6–13	4–3	4–3	4–3	1–5	14–5	4–3	12–7	11–8	3–4	5–2	3–3	0–6	—	11–9

=== Detailed records ===
National League
Opponent	W	L	WP	RS	RA
NL East
Atlanta Braves	3	4	0.429	23	26
Miami Marlins	4	2	0.667	22	18
New York Mets	5	2	0.714	32	18
Philadelphia Phillies	4	3	0.571	26	24
Washington Nationals	4	3	0.571	31	29
Total	20	14	0.588	134	115
NL Central
Chicago Cubs	12	7	0.632	59	44
Cincinnati Reds	11	8	0.579	73	71
Milwaukee Brewers	12	7	0.632	83	75
Pittsburgh Pirates					
St. Louis Cardinals	10	9	0.526	85	87
Total	45	31	0.592	300	277
NL West
Arizona Diamondbacks	3	3	0.500	26	39
Colorado Rockies	2	4	0.333	19	26
Los Angeles Dodgers	2	4	0.333	14	18
San Diego Padres	3	4	0.429	26	15
San Francisco Giants	4	3	0.571	36	36
Total	14	18	0.438	121	134
American League
Detroit Tigers	3	1	0.750	12	9
Houston Astros	2	1	0.667	8	8
Los Angeles Angels of Anaheim	3	0	1.000	21	12
Oakland Athletics	1	2	0.333	7	4
Seattle Mariners	3	1	0.750	18	9
Texas Rangers	3	0	1.000	13	9
Total	15	5	0.750	79	51
Season Total	94	68	0.580	634	577

Month	Games	Won	Lost	Win %	RS	RA
April	27	15	12	0.556	110	110
May	28	19	9	0.679	99	76
June	26	17	9	0.654	111	89
July	26	14	12	0.538	100	81
August	28	14	14	0.500	111	113
September	27	15	12	0.556	103	108
Total	162	94	68	0.580	634	577

	Games	Won	Lost	Win %	RS	RA
Home	81	50	31	0.617	309	267
Away	81	44	37	0.543	325	310
Total	162	94	68	0.580	634	577

== Regular season ==
=== April ===
- **April 4** – The Pirates take one out of three games against the Chicago Cubs in the season-opening series.
- **April 17** – Pitcher A. J. Burnett records his 2,000th career strikeout in a 5–0 victory over the St. Louis Cardinals.
- **April 29** – Russell Martin is named NL Player of the Week for the week ending April 28.
- Jason Grilli wins the Delivery Man of the Month Award for April.
- The Pirates finish the month with a win–loss record of 15–12, third in the NL Central and 0.5 games out of first.

=== May ===
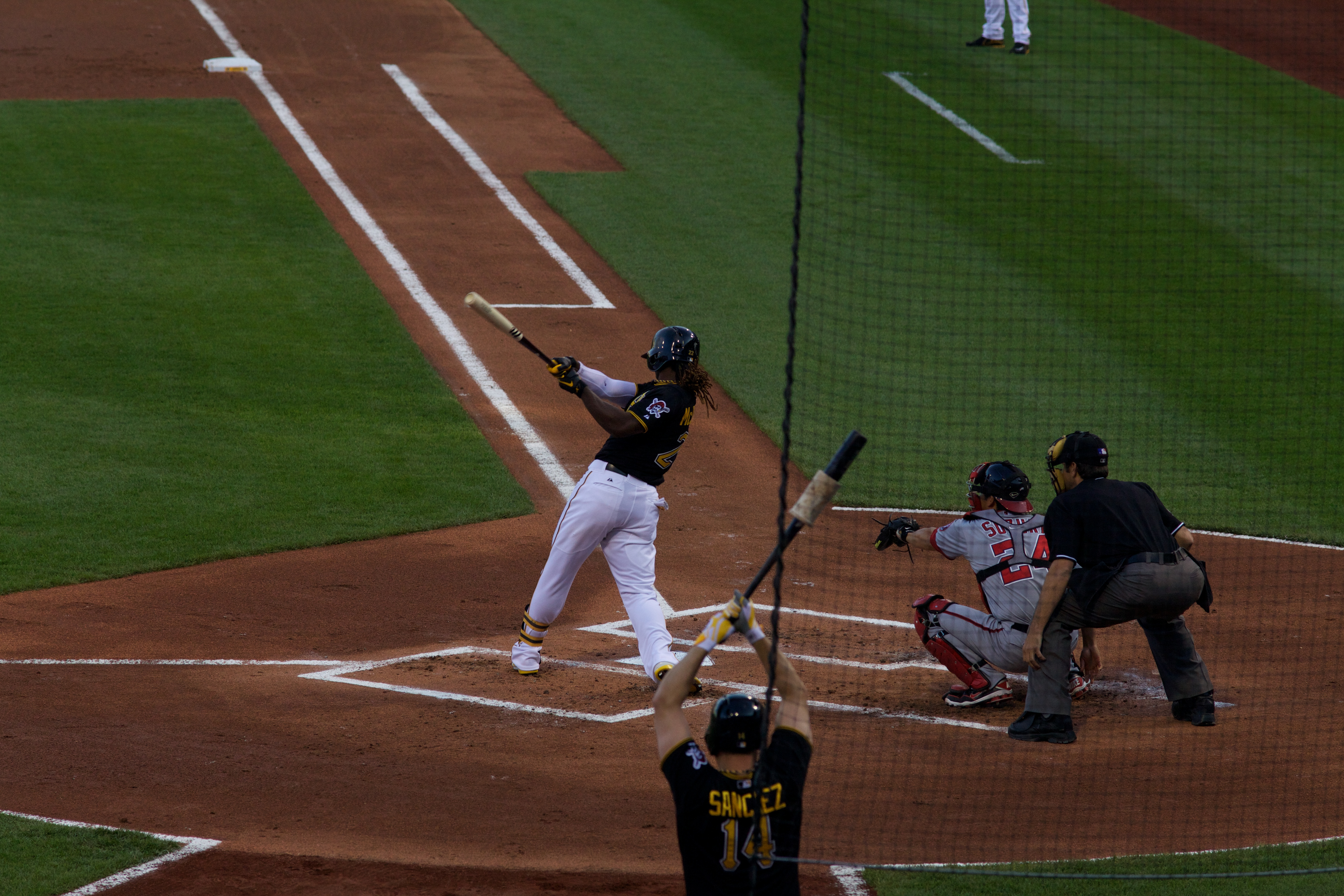
2013 NL MVP Andrew McCutchen bats against the Nationals on May 3.

- **May 11** – Pitcher Francisco Liriano makes his Pirates debut, striking out nine and allowing one run over 5.2 innings in an 11–2 road victory against the New York Mets. This was Liriano's first appearance of his NL Comeback Player of the Year season.
- Jason Grilli wins the Delivery Man Award for May, his second of the season.
- The Pirates finish the month with a win–loss record of 34–21, tied for second in the NL Central with the Cincinnati Reds and 2.0 games out of first.

=== June ===
- **June 11** – Starting pitcher Gerrit Cole makes his awaited MLB debut, in which he strikes out the first batter he faces on three pitches, records a two-run single, and pitches 6.1 innings to earn the win in an 8–2 home victory over the San Francisco Giants.
- **June 24** – Pedro Alvarez is named NL Player of the Week for the week ending June 23.
- **June 29** – The Pirates, with the best record in MLB, become the first team to reach 50 wins in the 2013 season.
- The Pirates finish the month on a nine-game winning streak with a win–loss record of 51–30, first place in the NL Central with the best record in the majors.

=== July ===
- **July 7** – Pedro Alvarez (3B), Jason Grilli (P), Jeff Locke (P), Andrew McCutchen (OF), and Mark Melancon (P) are named to the National League All-Star team. The Pirates had not sent five players to the All-Star game since 1972.
- **July 14** – The Pirates enter the All-Star break with a win–loss record of 56–37, second in the NL Central and one game behind the St. Louis Cardinals.
- The Pirates finish the month with a win–loss record of 65–42, first place in the NL Central with the best record in the majors.

=== August ===
- **August 1** – The Pirates win four games out of a five-game homestand, including a double-header sweep, against the St. Louis Cardinals to hold onto first place in the NL Central.
- **August 5** – Francisco Liriano is named NL Player of the Week for the week ending August 4.
- **August 28** – Recently acquired outfielder Marlon Byrd hits a three-run home run in his first game as a Pirate, contributing to a 7–1 home victory over the Milwaukee Brewers.
- The Pirates finish the penultimate month of the regular season with a win–loss record of 79–56, one game ahead of the Cardinals for first place in the NL Central.

=== September ===
- **September 9** – After a four-game losing streak, the Pirates defeat the Texas Rangers on the road to secure their 82nd win of the season and ensure their first winning season since 1992.
- **September 20** – Pitcher Francisco Liriano records the 1,000th strikeout of his career in a 6–5 extra-inning home loss to the Cincinnati Reds.
- **September 23** – The Pirates defeat the Chicago Cubs on the road to secure their first playoff berth since 1992 as an NL Wild Card.
- **September 28** – The Pirates combine to hit six home runs against the Cincinnati Reds, five off of starter Bronson Arroyo, two of which were hit by Neil Walker in an 8–3 victory.
- **September 29** – The Pirates finish the regular season with a three-game away sweep of the Reds to earn home-field advantage in the NL Wild Card game.
- Gerrit Cole is named NL Rookie of the Month for September, having earned a win in each of his four starts in September, improving his rookie season win–loss record to 10–7.
- At the conclusion of the season, the Pirates had a win–loss record of 94–68, finishing second in the NL Central behind the St. Louis Cardinals.

=== Game log ===
2013 Game Log: 94–68 (Home: 50–31; Away: 44–37)
April: 15–12 (Home: 8–4; Away: 7–8)

#	Date	Opponent	Score	Win	Loss	Save	Attendance	Record
1	April 1	Cubs	1–3	Samardzija (1–0)	**Burnett** (0–1)	Fujikawa (1)	39,078	0–1
2	April 3	Cubs	3–0	**Rodríguez** (1–0)	Jackson (0–1)	**Grilli** (1)	27,667	1–1
3	April 4	Cubs	2–3	Wood (1–0)	**McDonald** (0–1)	Mármol (1)	11,634	1–2
4	April 5	@ Dodgers	0–3	Greinke (1–0)	**Sánchez** (0–1)	League (1)	40,607	1–3
5	April 6	@ Dodgers	0–1	Kershaw (2–0)	**Burnett** (0–2)	League (2)	39,446	1–4
6	April 7	@ Dodgers	2–6	Ryu (1–1)	**Locke** (0–1)	—	52,503	1–5
7	April 8	@ Diamondbacks	5–3	**Gómez** (1–0)	Cahill (0–2)	**Grilli** (2)	21,392	2–5
8	April 9	@ Diamondbacks	6–5	**McDonald** (1–1)	McCarthy (0–1)	**Grilli** (3)	19,872	3–5
9	April 10	@ Diamondbacks	2–10	Miley (2–0)	**Sánchez** (0–2)	—	17,769	3–6
10	April 12	Reds	6–5	**Watson** (1–0)	Hoover (0–3)	**Grilli** (4)	24,366	4–6
11	April 13	Reds	3–1	**Locke** (1–1)	Simón (0–1)	**Grilli** (5)	25,118	5–6
12	April 14	Reds	10–7	**Hughes** (1–0)	Broxton (0–1)	—	19,239	6–6
13	April 15	Cardinals	6–10	Lynn (2–0)	**McDonald** (1–2)	—	10,539	6–7
—	April 16	Cardinals	Postponed (rain) Makeup: July 30					
14	April 17	Cardinals	5–0	**Burnett** (1–2)	Miller (2–1)	—	9,570	7–7
15	April 18	Braves	4–6	Varvaro (1–0)	**Hughes** (0–1)	Kimbrel (7)	11,288	7–8
16	April 19	Braves	6–0	**Rodríguez** (2–0)	Hudson (2–1)	—	18,705	8–8
17	April 20	Braves	3–1	**McDonald** (2–2)	Maholm (3–1)	**Grilli** (6)	29,313	9–8
18	April 21	Braves	4–2	**Wilson** (1–0)	Medlen (1–2)	**Grilli** (7)	20,873	10–8
19	April 22	@ Phillies	2–3	Valdés (1–0)	**Hughes** (1–2)	Papelbon (4)	35,385	10–9
20	April 23	@ Phillies	2–0	**Locke** (2–1)	Hamels (0–3)	**Grilli** (8)	31,002	11–9
21	April 24	@ Phillies	5–3	**Mazzaro** (1–0)	Adams (1–2)	**Grilli** (9)	32,158	12–9
22	April 25	@ Phillies	6–4	**Wilson** (2–0)	Aumont (1–3)	**Watson** (1)	33,443	13–9
23	April 26	@ Cardinals	1–9	Lynn (4–0)	**Sánchez** (0–3)	—	44,090	13–10
24	April 27	@ Cardinals	5–3	**Burnett** (2–2)	Kelly (0–1)	**Grilli** (10)	40,909	14–10
25	April 28	@ Cardinals	9–0	**Locke** (3–1)	Miller (3–2)	—	41,470	15–10
26	April 29	@ Brewers	4–10	Gallardo (3–1)	**Rodríguez** (2–1)	—	21,255	15–11
27	April 30	@ Brewers	8–12	Gorzelanny (1–0)	**Morris** (0–1)	—	24,154	15–12

May: 19–9 (Home: 12–6; Away: 7–3)

#	Date	Opponent	Score	Win	Loss	Save	Attendance	Record
28	May 1	@ Brewers	6–4	**Morris** (1–1)	Axford (0–3)	**Grilli** (11)	26,079	16–12
29	May 3	Nationals	3–1	**Burnett** (3–2)	Detwiler (1–3)	**Grilli** (12)	26,404	17–12
30	May 4	Nationals	4–5	Clippard (2–1)	**Watson** (1–1)	Soriano (10)	29,975	17–13
31	May 5	Nationals	2–6	Gonzalez (3–2)	**Rodríguez** (2–2)	—	24,186	17–14
32	May 7	Mariners	4–1	**Gómez** (2–0)	Harang (1–4)	**Grilli** (13)	12,973	18–14
33	May 8	Mariners	1–2	Hernández (5–2)	**Burnett** (3–3)	Wilhelmsen (9)	18,877	18–15
34	May 9	@ Mets	2–3	Parnell (4–0)	**Grilli** (0–1)	—	20,147	18–16
35	May 10	@ Mets	7–3	**Rodríguez** (3–2)	Marcum (0–3)	**Grilli** (14)	25,123	19–16
36	May 11	@ Mets	11–2	**Liriano** (1–0)	Niese (2–4)	—	31,160	20–16
37	May 12	@ Mets	3–2	**Wilson** (3–0)	Rice (1–2)	**Grilli** (15)	28,404	21–16
38	May 13	Brewers	1–5	Estrada (3–2)	**Burnett** (3–4)	—	11,872	21–17
39	May 14	Brewers	4–3 (12)	**Mazzaro** (2–0)	Fiers (0–2)	—	11,556	22–17
40	May 15	Brewers	3–1	**Rodríguez** (4–2)	Gallardo (3–3)	**Grilli** (16)	13,554	23–17
41	May 16	Brewers	7–1	**Liriano** (2–0)	Burgos (1–2)	—	16,434	24–17
42	May 17	Astros	5–4	**Wilson** (4–0)	González (0–1)	—	29,743	25–17
43	May 18	Astros	2–4 (11)	Cisnero (1–0)	**Morris** (1–2)	Veras (6)	32,925	25–18
44	May 19	Astros	1–0	**Locke** (4–1)	Harrell (3–5)	**Grilli** (17)	28,471	26–18
45	May 21	Cubs	5–4	**Rodríguez** (5–2)	Russell (0–1)	**Grilli** (18)	16,092	27–18
46	May 22	Cubs	1–0	**Liriano** (3–0)	Samardzija (2–6)	**Melancon** (1)	12,675	28–18
47	May 23	Cubs	4–2	**Mazzaro** (3–0)	Jackson (1–7)	**Grilli** (19)	24,552	29–18
48	May 24	@ Brewers	1–2	Estrada (4–2)	**Burnett** (3–5)	Rodríguez (1)	33,874	29–19
49	May 25	@ Brewers	5–2	**Locke** (5–1)	Fiers (1–3)	—	40,410	30–19
50	May 26	@ Brewers	5–4	**Rodríguez** (6–2)	Gallardo (3–5)	**Grilli** (20)	44,626	31–19
51	May 27	@ Tigers	5–6	Verlander (6–4)	**Liriano** (3–1)	Valverde (6)	41,416	31–20
52	May 28	@ Tigers	1–0 (11)	**Melancon** (1–0)	Ortega (0–2)	**Grilli** (21)	33,473	32–20
53	May 29	Tigers	5–3	**Morris** (2–2)	Sánchez (5–5)	**Grilli** (22)	19,980	33–20
54	May 30	Tigers	1–0 (11)	**Morris** (3–2)	Putkonen (1–1)	—	20,834	34–20
55	May 31	Reds	0–6	Cueto (3–0)	**Rodríguez** (6–3)	—	35,730	34–21

June: 17–9 (Home: 8–3; Away: 9–6)

#	Date	Opponent	Score	Win	Loss	Save	Attendance	Record
56	June 1	Reds	0–2	Leake (5–2)	**Liriano** (3–2)	Chapman (14)	33,912	34–22
57	June 2	Reds	5–4 (11)	**Wilson** (5–0)	Simón (4–2)	—	29,407	35–22
58	June 3	@ Braves	2–7	Medlen (2–6)	**Burnett** (3–6)	—	19,526	35–23
59	June 4	@ Braves	4–5 (10)	Varvaro (3–0)	**Melancon** (1–1)	—	28,861	35–24
60	June 5	@ Braves	0–5	Teherán (4–2)	**Rodríguez** (6–4)	—	28,703	35–25
61	June 7	@ Cubs	2–0	**Liriano** (4–2)	Wood (5–4)	**Grilli** (23)	31,614	36–25
62	June 8	@ Cubs	6–2	**Burnett** (4–6)	Samardzija (3–7)	—	38,405	37–25
63	June 9	@ Cubs	1–4	Jackson (2–8)	**Wilson** (5–1)	Gregg (7)	31,858	37–26
64	June 11	Giants	8–2	**Cole** (1–0)	Lincecum (4–6)	—	30,614	38–26
65	June 12	Giants	12–8	**Liriano** (5–2)	Zito (4–5)	—	19,966	39–26
66	June 13	Giants	0–10	Cain (5–3)	**Morton** (0–1)	—	22,532	39–27
67	June 14	Dodgers	3–0	**Locke** (6–1)	Fife (1–2)	**Grilli** (24)	36,878	40–27
68	June 15	Dodgers	3–5 (11)	Moylan (1–0)	**Mazzaro** (3–1)	League (14)	36,941	40–28
69	June 16	Dodgers	6–3	**Cole** (2–0)	Greinke (3–2)	**Grilli** (25)	37,263	41–28
70	June 17	@ Reds	1–4	Leake (7–3)	**Liriano** (5–3)	Chapman (18)	28,892	41–29
71	June 18	@ Reds	4–0	**Morton** (1–1)	Latos (6–1)	—	28,993	42–29
72	June 19	@ Reds	1–2 (13)	Parra (1–1)	**Mazzaro** (3–2)	—	36,567	42–30
73	June 20	@ Reds	5–3	**Morris** (4–2)	Simón (5–3)	**Watson** (2)	40,929	43–30
74	June 21	@ Angels	5–2	**Cole** (3–0)	Weaver (1–4)	**Grilli** (26)	40,136	44–30
75	June 22	@ Angels	6–1	**Liriano** (6–3)	Williams (5–3)	—	41,114	45–30
76	June 23	@ Angels	10–9 (10)	**Melancon** (2–1)	Jepsen (0–2)	—	35,069	46–30
77	June 25	@ Mariners	9–4	**Locke** (7–1)	Saunders (5–8)	—	21,074	47–30
78	June 26	@ Mariners	4–2	**Mazzaro** (4–2)	Furbush (1–4)	**Melancon** (2)	21,265	48–30
79	June 28	Brewers	10–3	**Cole** (4–0)	Hellweg (0–1)	**Reid** (1)	36,875	49–30
80	June 29	Brewers	2–1	**Liriano** (7–3)	Hand (0–1)	**Grilli** (27)	38,438	50–30
81	June 30	Brewers	2–1 (14)	**Watson** (2–1)	Rodríguez (1–1)	—	35,351	51–30

July: 14–12 (Home: 8–5; Away: 6–7)

#	Date	Opponent	Score	Win	Loss	Save	Attendance	Record
82	July 2	Phillies	1–3	Pettibone (4–3)	**Cumpton** (0–1)	Papelbon (16)	30,301	51–31
83	July 3	Phillies	6–5	**Locke** (8–1)	Lannan (1–3)	**Grilli** (28)	33,197	52–31
84	July 4	Phillies	4–6	Hamels (3–11)	**Cole** (4–1)	Papelbon (17)	35,328	52–32
85	July 5	@ Cubs	6–2	**Liriano** (8–3)	Samardzija (5–8)	—	38,615	53–32
86	July 6	@ Cubs	1–4	Jackson (5–10)	**Morton** (1–2)	Gregg (15)	36,590	53–33
87	July 7	@ Cubs	3–4 (11)	Guerrier (3–4)	**Morris** (4–3)	—	33,146	53–34
88	July 8	Athletics	1–2	Colón (12–3)	**Locke** (8–2)	Balfour (23)	23,743	53–35
89	July 9	Athletics	1–2	Straily (6–2)	**Cole** (4–2)	Balfour (24)	24,560	53–36
90	July 10	Athletics	5–0	**Liriano** (9–3)	Milone (8–8)	—	23,474	54–36
91	July 12	Mets	3–2 (11)	**Mazzaro** (5–2)	Germen (0–1)	—	39,036	55–36
92	July 13	Mets	4–2	**Wilson** (6–1)	Burke (0–2)	**Grilli** (29)	39,173	56–36
93	July 14	Mets	2–4	Gee (7–7)	**Cole** (4–3)	Parnell (17)	37,490	56–37
**All–Star Break (July 15–18)**
94	July 19	@ Reds	3–5	Leake (9–4)	**Liriano** (9–4)	Chapman (22)	40,831	56–38
95	July 20	@ Reds	4–5	Latos (9–3)	**Burnett** (4–7)	Chapman (23)	34,728	56–39
96	July 21	@ Reds	3–2	**Locke** (9–2)	Bailey (5–9)	**Grilli** (30)	40,824	57–39
97	July 22	@ Nationals	6–5	**Morton** (2–2)	Haren (4–11)	**Mazzaro** (1)	29,200	58–39
98	July 23	@ Nationals	5–1	**Cole** (5–3)	Jordan (0–3)	—	32,976	59–39
99	July 24	@ Nationals	4–2	**Liriano** (10–4)	Strasburg (5–8)	**Melancon** (3)	33,636	60–39
100	July 25	@ Nationals	7–9	Krol (1–0)	**Morris** (4–4)	—	38,862	60–40
101	July 26	@ Marlins	0–2	Álvarez (1–1)	**Locke** (9–3)	Cishek (21)	18,718	60–41
102	July 27	@ Marlins	7–4	**Morton** (3–2)	Koehler (2–6)	**Melancon** (4)	22,410	61–41
103	July 28	@ Marlins	2–3	Fernández (7–5)	**Cole** (5–4)	Cishek (22)	24,207	61–42
104	July 29	Cardinals	9–2	**Liriano** (11–4)	Westbrook (7–5)	—	32,084	62–42
105	July 30	Cardinals	2–1 (11)	**Mazzaro** (6–2)	Siegrist (0–1)	—	N/A	63–42
106	July 30	Cardinals	6–0	**Cumpton** (1–1)	Lyons (2–4)	—	33,861	64–42
107	July 31	Cardinals	5–4	**Watson** (3–1)	Rosenthal (1–2)	**Melancon** (5)	31,679	65–42

August: 14–14 (Home: 9–6; Away: 5–8)

#	Date	Opponent	Score	Win	Loss	Save	Attendance	Record
108	Aug 1	Cardinals	0–13	Kelly (2–3)	**Morton** (3–3)	—	31,999	65–43
109	Aug 2	Rockies	2–4	Chacín (10–5)	**Cole** (5–5)	Brothers (8)	37,487	65–44
110	Aug 3	Rockies	5–2	**Liriano** (12–4)	de la Rosa (10–6)	**Melancon** (6)	38,424	66–44
111	Aug 4	Rockies	5–1	**Burnett** (5–7)	Nicasio (6–6)	—	37,980	67–44
112	Aug 6	Marlins	4–3	**Morris** (5–4)	Dunn (2–3)	—	27,907	68–44
113	Aug 7	Marlins	4–2	**Morton** (4–3)	Koehler (3–7)	**Melancon** (7)	28,173	69–44
114	Aug 8	Marlins	5–4 (10)	**Hughes** (2–2)	Ames (0–1)	—	33,646	70–44
115	Aug 9	@ Rockies	1–10	de la Rosa (11–6)	**Liriano** (12–5)	—	37,444	70–45
116	Aug 10	@ Rockies	4–6	López (2–4)	**Burnett** (5–8)	Brothers (9)	40,728	70–46
117	Aug 11	@ Rockies	2–3	Corpas (1–2)	**Morris** (5–5)	Brothers (10)	44,657	70–47
118	Aug 13	@ Cardinals	3–4 (14)	Freeman (1–0)	**Hughes** (2–3)	—	40,243	70–48
119	Aug 14	@ Cardinals	5–1	**Liriano** (13–5)	Miller (11–8)	—	40,644	71–48
120	Aug 15	@ Cardinals	5–6 (12)	Siegrist (1–1)	**Morris** (5–6)	—	41,502	71–49
121	Aug 16	Diamondbacks	6–2	**Cole** (6–5)	McCarthy (2–7)	—	39,091	72–49
122	Aug 17	Diamondbacks	5–15	Cahill (4–10)	**Locke** (9–4)	—	37,982	72–50
123	Aug 18	Diamondbacks	2–4 (16)	Ziegler (7–1)	**Johnson** (0–1)	Putz (6)	37,518	72–51
124	Aug 19	@ Padres	3–1	**Liriano** (14–5)	Cashner (8–8)	**Melancon** (8)	24,850	73–51
125	Aug 20	@ Padres	8–1	**Burnett** (6–8)	Ross (3–6)	—	21,381	74–51
126	Aug 21	@ Padres	1–2	Kennedy (5–9)	**Cole** (6–6)	Street (24)	19,126	74–52
127	Aug 22	@ Giants	10–5	**Gómez** (3–0)	Moscoso (1–2)	—	41,733	75–52
128	Aug 23	@ Giants	3–1	**Morton** (5–3)	Bumgarner (11–8)	**Melancon** (9)	41,583	76–52
129	Aug 24	@ Giants	3–6	Lincecum (7–13)	**Liriano** (14–6)	Romo (31)	42,059	76–53
130	Aug 25	@ Giants	0–4	Vogelsong (3–4)	**Burnett** (6–9)	—	41,815	76–54
131	Aug 27	Brewers	6–7	Wooten (3–0)	**Morris** (5–7)	Henderson (22)	23,801	76–55
132	Aug 28	Brewers	7–1	**Morton** (6–3)	Gorzelanny (3–6)	—	20,634	77–55
133	Aug 29	Brewers	0–4	Gallardo (10–9)	**Cole** (6–7)	—	23,747	77–56
134	Aug 30	Cardinals	5–0	**Liriano** (15–6)	Miller (12–9)	—	38,026	78–56
135	Aug 31	Cardinals	7–1	**Burnett** (7–9)	Lynn (13–9)	—	39,514	79–56

September: 15–12 (Home: 5–7; Away: 10–5)

#	Date	Opponent	Score	Win	Loss	Save	Attendance	Record
136	Sep 1	Cardinals	2–7	Kelly (7–3)	**Johnson** (0–2)	—	37,912	79–57
137	Sep 2	@ Brewers	5–2	**Morton** (7–3)	Thornburg (1–1)	**Melancon** (10)	23,252	80–57
138	Sep 3	@ Brewers	4–3	**Mazzaro** (7–2)	Henderson (3–5)	**Melancon** (11)	25,558	81–57
139	Sep 4	@ Brewers	3–9	Peralta (9–14)	**Liriano** (15–7)	—	29,041	81–58
140	Sep 6	@ Cardinals	8–12	Kelly (8–3)	**Burnett** (7–10)	Mujica (36)	40,608	81–59
141	Sep 7	@ Cardinals	0–5	Wainwright (16–9)	**Locke** (9–5)	—	45,110	81–60
142	Sep 8	@ Cardinals	2–9	Wacha (3–0)	**Morton** (7–4)	—	40,156	81–61
143	Sep 9	@ Rangers	1–0	**Cole** (7–7)	Darvish (12–8)	**Melancon** (12)	33,243	82–61
144	Sep 10	@ Rangers	5–4	**Liriano** (16–7)	Perez (9–4)	**Melancon** (13)	36,313	83–61
145	Sep 11	@ Rangers	7–5	**Burnett** (8–10)	Garza (3–4)	**Farnsworth** (1)	30,629	84–61
146	Sep 12	Cubs	3–1	**Locke** (10–5)	Rusin (2–4)	**Melancon** (14)	23,541	85–61
147	Sep 13	Cubs	4–5	Villanueva (6–8)	**Grilli** (0–2)	Gregg (32)	35,962	85–62
148	Sep 14	Cubs	2–1	**Cole** (8–7)	Russell (1–6)	**Melancon** (15)	37,534	86–62
149	Sep 15	Cubs	3–2	**Farnsworth** (3–0)	Strop (2–5)	**Melancon** (16)	36,559	87–62
150	Sep 16	Padres	0–2	Cashner (10–8)	**Burnett** (8–11)	—	20,633	87–63
151	Sep 17	Padres	2–5	Stults (9–13)	**Locke** (10–6)	Gregerson (4)	22,520	87–64
152	Sep 18	Padres	2–3	Thayer (3–5)	**Melancon** (2–2)	Street (31)	27,640	87–65
153	Sep 19	Padres	10–1	**Cole** (9–7)	Kennedy (6–10)	—	26,242	88–65
154	Sep 20	Reds	5–6 (10)	Hoover (5–5)	**Farnsworth** (3–1)	Chapman (38)	37,940	88–66
155	Sep 21	Reds	4–2	**Burnett** (9–11)	Bailey (11–11)	**Grilli** (31)	39,425	89–66
156	Sep 22	Reds	3–11	Arroyo (14–11)	**Locke** (10–7)	—	38,699	89–67
157	Sep 23	@ Cubs	2–1	**Melancon** (3–2)	Gregg (2–6)	**Grilli** (32)	32,289	90–67
158	Sep 24	@ Cubs	8–2	**Cole** (10–7)	Rusin (2–6)	—	34,138	91–67
159	Sep 25	@ Cubs	2–4	Arrieta (5–4)	**Liriano** (16–8)	Gregg (33)	26,171	91–68
160	Sep 27	@ Reds	4–1	**Burnett** (10–11)	Bailey (11–12)	**Grilli** (33)	40,107	92–68
161	Sep 28	@ Reds	8–3	**Mazzaro** (8–2)	Arroyo (14–12)	—	40,707	93–68
162	Sep 29	@ Reds	4–2	**Cumpton** (2–1)	Reynolds (1–3)	**Farnsworth** (2)	40,142	94–68

Legend: = Win = Loss = Postponement
Bold = Pirates team member

== Postseason ==
=== Wild Card Game ===
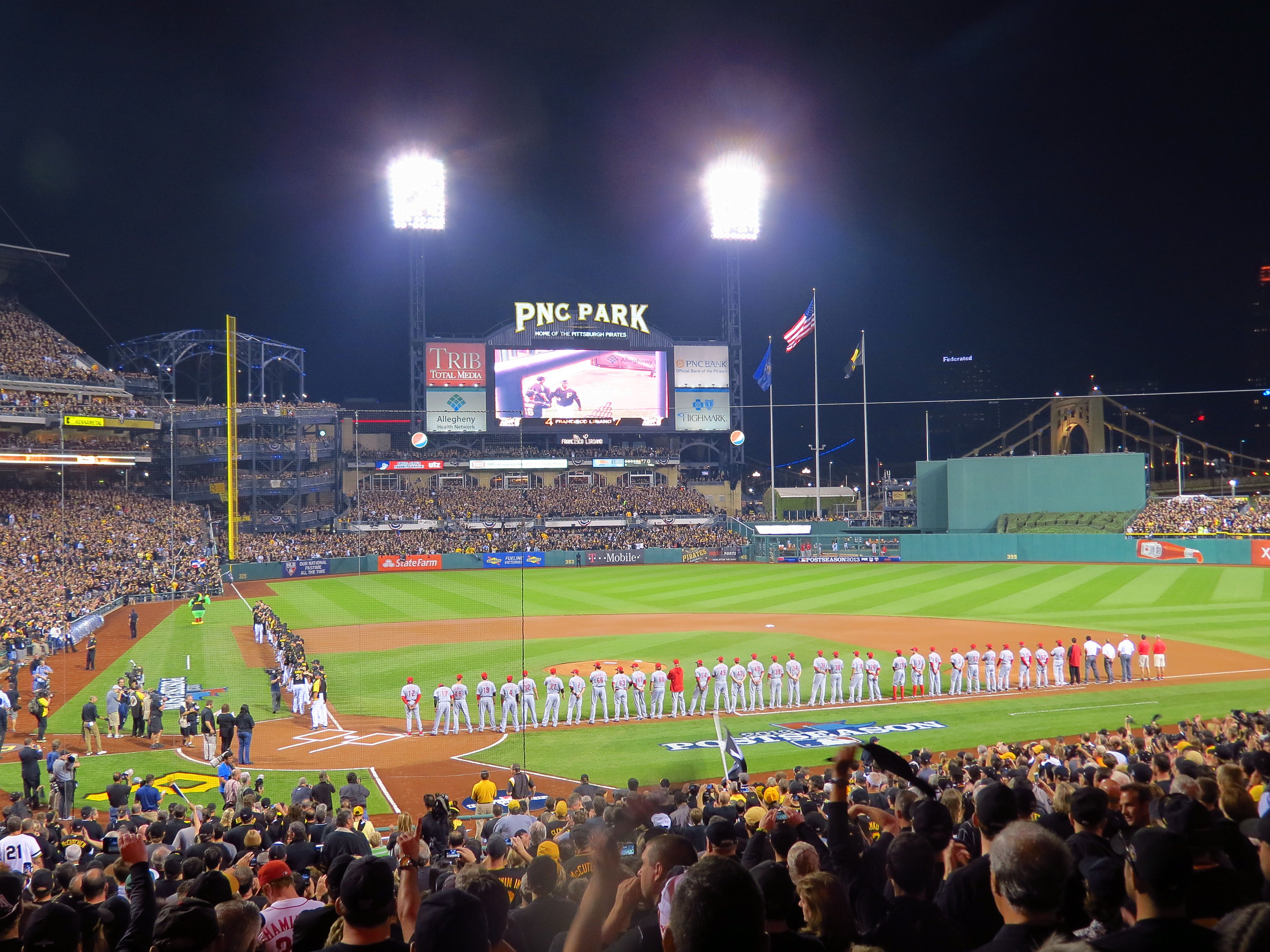
Pre-game festivities before the October 1 Wild Card game at PNC Park.

- **October 1 – National League Wild Card game –** This game marked the first Pirates postseason appearance since 1992 and the first postseason game ever played at PNC Park. After a scoreless first inning and a half, the Pirates secured the first runs of the game with home runs by Marlon Byrd and Russell Martin in the bottom of the 2nd inning. In the bottom of the third, Pedro Alvarez hit a sacrifice-fly to Shin-Soo Choo, which allowed Andrew McCutchen to score. In the top of the fourth, with Choo and Ryan Ludwick on base, Jay Bruce hit a groundball single to Pirates left-fielder Starling Marte, allowing Choo to score. In the bottom of the fourth, Marte and Neil Walker scored off RBI hits by Walker and Byrd, respectively. In the bottom of the 7th inning, Russell Martin hit a solo home run. The Reds could only further respond with a Choo home run off of Tony Watson. The Pirates held on to win with Jason Grilli closing the game, setting the Pirates up to face the St. Louis Cardinals in the NLDS.

=== Division Series ===
- **October 3 – Game one –** The Cardinals set a new NLDS record with seven runs in an inning, highlighted by Carlos Beltrán's three-run home run (443 feet), his 15th in post-season play tying Babe Ruth for eighth place on the list. Only Derek Jeter (20) and Albert Pujols (18) among active players had more at the time.
- **October 4 – Game two –** The Pirates scored first with two outs in the second inning as Gerrit Cole drove in Pedro Álvarez with a single after Jordy Mercer was intentionally walked. Alvarez hit his second home run of the series in the third, a two-run line drive. The Pirates added to their lead with two runs in the fifth inning as Marlon Byrd drove home Justin Morneau with a double and Russell Martin plated Byrd with a single. The Cardinals finally got on the board with a solo home run from Yadier Molina in their half of the fifth inning. It was his third post-season home run. The Pirates added runs in the seventh inning as Martin plated Byrd again, this time via a sacrifice fly.
- **October 6 – Game three –** The Pirates opened up their first non-Wild Card postseason home game in 21 years by scoring two runs in the first inning. The Cardinals would later tie the game in the fifth with a two-out RBI single by Carlos Beltrán. The Pirates responded by scoring the next inning on a Russell Martin sacrifice fly, which was later answered by a Carlos Beltrán home run in the eighth. The Pirates would retake the lead in the bottom of the 8th and win the game by the score of 5-3.
- **October 7 – Game four –** Game 4 featured a quality start from St. Louis Cardinals rookie Michael Wacha. Wacha held the Pirates to just three base runners (one hit, two walks) through 7 1/3 innings pitched. It was the longest no-hitter length by a rookie pitcher since Jeff Tesreau went 5 1/3 innings with no hits allowed for the 1912 New York Giants. Pedro Alvarez broke up Wacha's no-hitter in the eighth with his third home run of the series. Matt Holliday hit a two-run home run in the sixth, providing the Cardinals' margin of victory. Charlie Morton went 5 2/3 innings pitched, allowing just two runs.
- **October 9 – Game five –** Game 5 pitted Game 1 winner Adam Wainwright against the Pirates' rookie Gerrit Cole. The Cardinals got on the board first in the bottom of the second inning as Jon Jay walked with two-outs and David Freese broke the tie with a two-run home run. The Cardinals added to their lead in the sixth as Jay singled home Matt Holliday to make it 3–0. The Pirates rallied with two outs in the top of the seventh as Justin Morneau, Marlon Byrd and Pedro Alvarez all singled (the last driving home Morneau), but Wainwright was able to get Russell Martin to ground out to end the threat. Entering the bottom of the eighth and with the Cardinals leading 3–1, they put the game out of reach as Matt Adams hit a two-run home run off of Mark Melancon to make it 5–1. They added another run on a Pete Kozma single. Wainwright finished the complete game by striking out Alvarez with two runners on base to end the Pirates' season.

=== Game log ===
2013 Postseason Game Log
2013 NL Wild Card Game: vs. Cincinnati Reds (1–0)

#	Date	Opponent	Score	Win	Loss	Save	Attendance	Series
1	Oct 1	Reds	6–2	**Liriano** (1–0)	Cueto (0–1)	—	40,487	1–0

2013 NL Division Series: vs. St. Louis Cardinals (2–3)

#	Date	Opponent	Score	Win	Loss	Save	Attendance	Series
1	Oct 3	@ Cardinals	1–9	Wainwright (1–0)	**Burnett** (0–1)	—	45,693	STL leads 1–0
2	Oct 4	@ Cardinals	7–1	**Cole** (1–0)	Lynn (0–1)	—	45,999	Tied 1–1
3	Oct 6	Cardinals	5–3	**Melancon** (1–0)	Martinez (0–1)	**Grilli** (1)	40,489	PIT leads 2–1
4	Oct 7	Cardinals	1–2	Wacha (1–0)	**Morton** (0–1)	Rosenthal (1)	40,493	Tied 2–2
5	Oct 9	@ Cardinals	1–6	Wainwright (2–0)	**Cole** (1–1)	—	47,231	STL wins 3–2

Legend: = Win = Loss = Postponement
Bold = Pirates team member

== Roster ==
2013 Pittsburgh Pirates
Roster
Pitchers: 68 Vic Black; 34 A. J. Burnett; 45 Gerrit Cole; 52 José Contreras; 58 Brandon Cumpton; 25 Kyle Farnsworth; 30 Jeanmar Gómez; 39 Jason Grilli; 48 Jared Hughes; 36 Phil Irwin; 60 Kris Johnson; 63 Chris Leroux; 47 Francisco Liriano; 49 Jeff Locke; 32 Vin Mazzaro; 53 James McDonald; 35 Mark Melancon; 29 Bryan Morris; 50 Charlie Morton; 38 Stolmy Pimentel; 43 Ryan Reid; 51 Wandy Rodríguez; 57 Jonathan Sánchez; 44 Tony Watson; 61 Duke Welker; 37 Justin Wilson; 57 Mike Zagurski	Catchers: 14 John Buck; 55 Russell Martin; 19 Michael McKenry; 59 Tony Sanchez; Infielders: 24 Pedro Alvarez; 12 Clint Barmes; 5 Josh Harrison; 2 Brandon Inge; 46 Garrett Jones; 17 John McDonald; 10 Jordy Mercer; 36,66 Justin Morneau; 14,17 Gaby Sánchez; 18 Neil Walker	Outfielders: 2 Marlon Byrd; 57 Andrew Lambo; 6 Starling Marte; 22 Andrew McCutchen; 26 Félix Pie; 7 Alex Presley; 23 Travis Snider; 31 José Tábata	Manager: 13 Clint Hurdle; Coaches: 86 Heberto Andrade (bullpen catcher); 28 Jeff Banister (bench); 3 Jay Bell (hitting); 87 Jeff Branson (assistant hitting); 85 Dave Jauss (coach); 16 Nick Leyva (third base); 56 Euclides Rojas (bullpen); 54 Ray Searage (pitching); 41 Rick Sofield (first base)

=== Opening Day lineup ===
Opening Day Starters
Name	Position
Starling Marte	LF
Garrett Jones	RF
Andrew McCutchen	CF
Pedro Álvarez	3B
Gaby Sánchez	1B
Neil Walker	2B
Russell Martin	C
Clint Barmes	SS
A. J. Burnett	SP

== Notable achievements ==
=== Awards ===
2013 Major League Baseball All-Star Game

- Pedro Álvarez, 3B, reserve
- Jason Grilli, P, reserve
- Jeff Locke, P, reserve
- Andrew McCutchen, OF, reserve
- Mark Melancon, P, reserve – replaced Jeff Locke

NL Player of the Week

- Russell Martin (April 22–28)
- Pedro Álvarez (June 17–23)
- Francisco Liriano (July 29 – August 4)

MLB Delivery Man of the Month Award

- Jason Grilli (April)
- Jason Grilli (May)

NL Rookie of the Month

- Gerrit Cole (September)

The Sporting News Comeback Player of the Year Award

- Francisco Liriano

The Sporting News Manager of the Year Award

- Clint Hurdle

NL Comeback Player of the Year

- Francisco Liriano

NL Manager of the Year

- Clint Hurdle

NL MVP

- Andrew McCutchen

=== Milestones ===
Regular season
Player	Milestone	Reached
A. McCutchen	100th Career Stolen Base	April 3, 2013
A. Burnett	2000th Career Strikeout	April 17, 2013
G. Jones	500th Career Hit	April 17, 2013
J. McDonald	500th Career Inning Pitched	April 20, 2013
R. Martin	100th Career Home Run	June 8, 2013
G. Sánchez	100th Career Double	June 12, 2013
G. Sánchez	500th Career Game	June 15, 2013
N. Walker	100th Career Double	June 15, 2013
C. Morton	500th Career Inning Pitched	July 12, 2013
R. Martin	1000th Career Game	July 14, 2013
C. Barmes	1000th Career Game	July 22, 2013
V. Mazzaro	100th Career Game	July 25, 2013
A. Burnett	2100th Career Strikeout	July 30, 2013
M. Melancon	200th Career Game	August 3, 2013
N. Walker	500th Career Game	August 4, 2013
N. Walker	500th Career Hit	August 4, 2013
C. Morton	100th Career Game	August 13, 2013
C. Morton	100th Career Game Started	August 18, 2013
J. Hughes	100th Career Game	August 22, 2013
R. Martin	500th Career Run	August 30, 2013
G. Jones	100th Career Home Run	August 30, 2013
A. McCutchen	100th Career Home Run	September 3, 2013
F. Liriano	1000th Career Strikeout	September 20, 2013
G. Cole	100th Career Strikeout	September 24, 2013
F. Liriano	1000th Career Inning Pitched	September 25, 2013
A. Lambo	1st Career Home Run	September 28, 2013

Postseason
Player	Milestone	Reached
P. Álvarez	1st Career Post Season Game	October 1, 2013
C. Barmes	1st Career Post Season Hit	October 1, 2013
M. Byrd	1st Career Post Season Game	October 1, 2013
M. Byrd	1st Career Post Season Hit	October 1, 2013
M. Byrd	1st Career Post Season Home Run	October 1, 2013
M. Byrd	1st Career Post Season Run	October 1, 2013
F. Liriano	1st Career Post Season Win	October 1, 2013
S. Marte	1st Career Post Season Game	October 1, 2013
S. Marte	1st Career Post Season Hit	October 1, 2013
S. Marte	1st Career Post Season Run	October 1, 2013
A. McCutchen	1st Career Post Season Game	October 1, 2013
A. McCutchen	1st Career Post Season Hit	October 1, 2013
A. McCutchen	1st Career Post Season Run	October 1, 2013
T. Snider	1st Career Post Season Game	October 1, 2013
T. Snider	1st Career Post Season Hit	October 1, 2013
N. Walker	1st Career Post Season Game	October 1, 2013
N. Walker	1st Career Post Season Hit	October 1, 2013
N. Walker	1st Career Post Season Home Run	October 1, 2013
N. Walker	1st Career Post Season Run	October 1, 2013
T. Watson	1st Career Post Season Game	October 1, 2013
T. Watson	1st Career Post Season Inning Pitched	October 1, 2013
P. Álvarez	1st Career Post Season Hit	October 3, 2013
P. Álvarez	1st Career Post Season Home Run	October 3, 2013
P. Álvarez	1st Career Post Season Run	October 3, 2013
J. Gómez	1st Career Post Season Game	October 3, 2013
J. Gómez	1st Career Post Season Inning Pitched	October 3, 2013
V. Mazzaro	1st Career Post Season Game	October 3, 2013
V. Mazzaro	1st Career Post Season Inning Pitched	October 3, 2013
V. Mazzaro	1st Career Post Season Strike Out	October 3, 2013
J. Mercer	1st Career Post Season Game	October 3, 2013
J. Mercer	1st Career Post Season Hit	October 3, 2013
B. Morris	1st Career Post Season Game	October 3, 2013
B. Morris	1st Career Post Season Inning Pitched	October 3, 2013
B. Morris	1st Career Post Season Strike Out	October 3, 2013
J. Tábata	1st Career Post Season Game	October 3, 2013
G. Cole	1st Career Post Season Game	October 4, 2013
G. Cole	1st Career Post Season Hit	October 4, 2013
G. Cole	1st Career Post Season Inning Pitched	October 4, 2013
G. Cole	1st Career Post Season Strike Out	October 4, 2013
G. Cole	1st Career Post Season Win	October 4, 2013
S. Marte	1st Career Post Season Home Run	October 4, 2013
S. Marte	1st Career Post Season Stolen Base	October 4, 2013
M. Melancon	1st Career Post Season Game	October 4, 2013
M. Melancon	1st Career Post Season Inning Pitched	October 4, 2013
G. Sánchez	1st Career Post Season Game	October 4, 2013
T. Watson	1st Career Post Season Strike Out	October 4, 2013
J. Buck	1st Career Post Season Game	October 7, 2013
G. Jones	1st Career Post Season Game	October 7, 2013
C. Morton	1st Career Post Season Game	October 7, 2013
C. Morton	1st Career Post Season Inning Pitched	October 7, 2013
C. Morton	1st Career Post Season Strike Out	October 7, 2013
J. Wilson	1st Career Post Season Game	October 7, 2013
J. Wilson	1st Career Post Season Inning Pitched	October 7, 2013
J. Wilson	1st Career Post Season Strike Out	October 7, 2013

== Statistics ==
Batting

Note: G = Games played; AB = At bats; H = Hits; Avg. = Batting average; HR = Home runs; RBI = Runs batted in

Regular season
Player	G	AB	H	Avg.	HR	RBI
Marlon Byrd^{†}	30	107	34	0.318	3	17
Andrew McCutchen	157	583	185	0.317	21	84
John Buck^{†}	9	24	7	0.292	0	2
Jordy Mercer	103	333	95	0.285	8	27
José Tábata	106	308	87	0.282	6	33
Starling Marte	135	510	143	0.280	12	35
James McDonald	8	11	3	0.273	0	0
Alex Presley^{‡}	29	72	19	0.264	2	4
Justin Morneau^{†}	25	77	20	0.260	0	3
Gaby Sánchez	136	264	67	0.254	7	36
Neil Walker	133	478	120	0.251	16	53
Josh Harrison	60	88	22	0.250	3	14
Andrew Lambo	18	30	7	0.233	1	2
Tony Sanchez	22	60	14	0.233	2	5
Garrett Jones	144	403	94	0.233	15	51
Pedro Álvarez	152	558	130	0.233	36	100
Russell Martin	127	438	99	0.226	15	55
Michael McKenry	41	115	25	0.217	3	14
Travis Snider	111	261	56	0.215	5	25
Clint Barmes	108	304	64	0.211	5	23
Gerrit Cole	17	34	7	0.206	0	5
Bryan Morris	52	5	1	0.200	0	0
Brandon Inge^{‡}	50	105	19	0.181	1	7
Vin Mazzaro	54	6	1	0.167	0	0
Charlie Morton	19	36	5	0.139	0	1
Félix Pie	27	29	4	0.138	0	2
Jeff Locke	29	47	5	0.106	0	0
Wandy Rodríguez	13	22	2	0.091	0	1
Jeanmar Gómez	31	13	1	0.077	0	0
A. J. Burnett	29	59	4	0.068	0	2
John McDonald^{‡}	16	31	2	0.065	0	1
Francisco Liriano	23	47	3	0.064	0	1
Brandon Cumpton	6	9	0	0.000	0	0
Jared Hughes	29	2	0	0.000	0	0
Phil Irwin	1	1	0	0.000	0	0
Kris Johnson	4	2	0	0.000	0	0
Chris Leroux^{‡}	2	1	0	0.000	0	0
Stolmy Pimentel	5	1	0	0.000	0	0
Ryan Reid	6	1	0	0.000	0	0
Jonathan Sánchez^{‡}	6	5	0	0.000	0	0
Tony Watson	63	1	0	0.000	0	0
Justin Wilson	54	5	0	0.000	0	0
Vic Black^{‡}	3	0	0	—	0	0
José Contreras^{‡}	6	0	0	—	0	0
Kyle Farnsworth^{†}	8	0	0	—	0	0
Jason Grilli	51	0	0	—	0	0
Mark Melancon	68	0	0	—	0	0
Mike Zagurski^{‡}	5	0	0	—	0	0
Team Totals		5,486	1,345	0.245	161	603
MLB Rank		22	24	22	T–13	20

– Qualified for batting title (3.1 plate appearances per team game)

Postseason
Player	G	AB	H	Avg.	HR	RBI
Francisco Liriano	2	2	1	0.500	0	0
Marlon Byrd	6	22	8	0.364	1	5
Andrew McCutchen	6	21	7	0.333	0	0
Pedro Álvarez	6	20	6	0.300	3	7
Russell Martin	6	17	5	0.294	2	6
Justin Morneau	6	24	7	0.292	0	0
Clint Barmes	6	11	3	0.273	0	0
Gerrit Cole	2	4	1	0.250	0	1
Jordy Mercer	5	8	2	0.250	0	0
Starling Marte	6	24	3	0.125	1	1
Neil Walker	6	24	2	0.083	0	1
A. J. Burnett	1	1	0	0.000	0	0
Jeanmar Gómez	1	1	0	0.000	0	0
Garrett Jones	2	2	0	0.000	0	0
Charlie Morton	1	1	0	0.000	0	0
Gaby Sánchez	2	2	0	0.000	0	0
Travis Snider	1	1	0	0.000	0	0
José Tábata	4	4	0	0.000	0	0
John Buck	1	0	0	—	0	0
Jason Grilli	4	0	0	—	0	0
Josh Harrison	2	0	0	—	0	0
Vin Mazzaro	3	0	0	—	0	0
Mark Melancon	4	0	0	—	0	0
Bryan Morris	1	0	0	—	0	0
Tony Watson	4	0	0	—	0	0
Justin Wilson	2	0	0	—	0	0
Team Totals		189	45	0.238	7	21

Pitching

Note: G = Games pitched; IP = Innings pitched; W = Wins; L = Losses; ERA = Earned run average; SO = Strikeouts

Regular season
Player	G	IP	W	L	ERA	SO
Josh Harrison	1	1/3	0	0	0.00	0
Duke Welker^{‡}	2	1 1/3	0	0	0.00	1
Kyle Farnsworth^{†}	9	8 2/3	1	1	1.04	9
Mark Melancon	72	71	3	2	1.39	70
Ryan Reid	7	11	0	0	1.64	7
Stolmy Pimentel	5	9 1/3	0	0	1.93	9
Brandon Cumpton	6	30 2/3	2	1	2.05	22
Justin Wilson	58	73 2/3	6	1	2.08	59
Tony Watson	67	71 2/3	3	1	2.39	54
Jason Grilli	54	50	0	2	2.70	74
Vin Mazzaro	57	73 2/3	8	2	2.81	46
Francisco Liriano	26	161	16	8	3.02	163
Gerrit Cole	19	117 1/3	10	7	3.22	100
Charlie Morton	20	116	7	4	3.26	85
A. J. Burnett	30	191	10	11	3.30	209
Jeanmar Gómez	34	80 2/3	3	0	3.35	53
Bryan Morris	55	65	5	7	3.46	37
Jeff Locke	30	166 1/3	10	7	3.52	125
Wandy Rodríguez	12	62 2/3	6	4	3.59	46
Vic Black^{‡}	3	4	0	0	4.50	3
Jared Hughes	29	32	2	3	4.78	23
James McDonald	6	29 2/3	2	2	5.76	25
Kris Johnson	4	10 1/3	0	2	6.10	9
Chris Leroux^{‡}	2	4	0	0	6.75	3
Phil Irwin	1	4 2/3	0	0	7.71	4
José Contreras^{‡}	7	5	0	0	9.00	5
Jonathan Sánchez^{‡}	5	13 2/3	0	3	11.85	15
Mike Zagurski^{‡}	6	6	0	0	15.00	5
Team Totals		1,470 2/3	94	68	3.26	1,261
MLB Rank		4	5	26	3	9

– Qualified for ERA title (1 inning pitched per team game)

Postseason
Player	G	IP	W	L	ERA	SO
Jeanmar Gómez	1	4	0	0	0.00	0
Jason Grilli	4	3 1/3	0	0	0.00	4
Vin Mazzaro	3	1 2/3	0	0	0.00	2
Bryan Morris	1	1	0	0	0.00	1
Francisco Liriano	2	13	1	0	2.08	10
Tony Watson	4	4	0	0	2.25	1
Gerrit Cole	2	11	1	1	2.45	10
Charlie Morton	1	5 2/3	0	1	3.18	4
Justin Wilson	2	2 2/3	0	0	3.38	3
Mark Melancon	4	3 2/3	1	0	9.82	2
A. J. Burnett	1	2	0	1	31.50	0
Team Totals		52	3	3	3.63	37

Legend

- Stats reflect time with the Pirates only.

^{†} – Denotes player was acquired mid-season.
^{‡} – Denotes player was relinquished mid-season.

== Transactions ==
The Pirates were involved in the following transactions during the 2013 season:

- Black line marks the transition between off season and regular season

=== Trades ===
November 28, 2012	To Kansas City Royals: Luis Rico; Luis Santos	To Pittsburgh Pirates: Vin Mazzaro; Clint Robinson
November 28, 2012	To Boston Red Sox: PTBNL (Kyle Kaminska)	To Pittsburgh Pirates: Zach Stewart
November 30, 2012	To Baltimore Orioles: Yamaico Navarro	To Pittsburgh Pirates: Jhondaniel Medina
November 30, 2012	To Oakland Athletics: Chris Resop	To Pittsburgh Pirates: Zack Thornton
December 5, 2012	To Detroit Tigers: Ramón Cabrera	To Pittsburgh Pirates: Andrew Oliver
December 26, 2012	To Boston Red Sox: Joel Hanrahan; Brock Holt	To Pittsburgh Pirates: Mark Melancon; Stolmy Pimentel; Iván DeJesús, Jr. Jerry Sands
January 9, 2013	To Cleveland Indians: Quincy Latimore	To Pittsburgh Pirates: Jeanmar Gómez
March 20, 2013	To Arizona Diamondbacks: PTBNL or Cash	To Pittsburgh Pirates: John McDonald
March 29, 2013	To Cleveland Indians: Cash	To Pittsburgh Pirates: Brian Jeroloman
April 24, 2013	To Atlanta Braves: Román Colón	To Pittsburgh Pirates: Cash
May 17, 2013	To Washington Nationals: Brian Jeroloman	To Pittsburgh Pirates: PTBNL (Brian Bocock)
May 31, 2013	To Kansas City Royals: Cash	To Pittsburgh Pirates: Atahualpa Severino
May 31, 2013	To Boston Red Sox: Cash	To Pittsburgh Pirates: Graham Godfrey
June 10, 2013	To Cleveland Indians: John McDonald	To Pittsburgh Pirates: PTBNL or Cash
July 12, 2013	To Baltimore Orioles: Tim Alderson	To Pittsburgh Pirates: Russ Canzler
July 31, 2013	To Seattle Mariners: PTBNL or Cash	To Pittsburgh Pirates: Robert Andino
August 18, 2013	To Miami Marlins: PTBNL or Cash	To Pittsburgh Pirates: Doug Mathis
August 27, 2013	To New York Mets: Dilson Herrera; PTBNL or Cash (Vic Black)	To Pittsburgh Pirates: John Buck; Marlon Byrd; Cash
August 31, 2013	To Minnesota Twins: Alex Presley; PTBNL or Cash (Duke Welker)	To Pittsburgh Pirates: Justin Morneau

=== Free agents ===
Player	Acquired from	Lost to	Date	Contract terms
Darren Ford	Seattle Mariners		November 6, 2012	minor-league contract
Jared Goedert	Cleveland Indians		November 7, 2012	minor-league contract
Ryan Reid	Tampa Bay Rays		November 9, 2012	minor-league contract
Tim Wood		Minnesota Twins	November 10, 2012	1 year/$675,000
Eric Fryer		Minnesota Twins	November 11, 2012	minor-league contract
Dan Meyer		Baltimore Orioles	November 12, 2012	unknown
Daniel McCutchen		Baltimore Orioles	November 12, 2012	unknown
Jo-Jo Reyes		Los Angeles Angels	November 13, 2012	unknown
Nick Evans		Los Angeles Dodgers	November 19, 2012	unknown
Félix Pie	Atlanta Braves		November 19, 2012	minor-league contract
Tom Boleska		Minnesota Twins	November 20, 2012	unknown
Alex Valdez	Atlanta Braves		November 21, 2012	minor-league contract
Brooks Brown	Detroit Tigers		November 21, 2012	minor-league contract
David Bromberg	Minnesota Twins		November 21, 2012	minor-league contract
Erik Cordier	Atlanta Braves		November 21, 2012	minor-league contract
Luis Sanz	Detroit Tigers		November 21, 2012	minor-league contract
Jeff Clement		Minnesota Twins	November 26, 2012	minor-league contract
Russell Martin	New York Yankees		November 29, 2012	2 year/$17 million
Mike Zagurski	Arizona Diamondbacks		December 1, 2012	minor-league contract
Drew Sutton		Boston Red Sox	December 3, 2012	minor-league contract
Kevin Correia		Minnesota Twins	December 10, 2012	2 year/$10 million
Logan Kensing		Colorado Rockies	December 11, 2012	minor-league contract
Brandon Boggs		Minnesota Twins	December 11, 2012	minor-league contract
Dallas McPherson		Los Angeles Dodgers	January 9, 2013	minor-league contract
Lucas May	New York Mets		January 10, 2013	minor-league contract
Brad Hawpe	Texas Rangers		January 17, 2013	minor-league contract
Chad Qualls		Miami Marlins	January 25, 2013	1 year/$1.15 million
Kyle Waldrop	Minnesota Twins		January 29, 2013	minor-league contract
Jonathan Sánchez	Colorado Rockies		February 6, 2013	1 year/$1.375 million
Rod Barajas		Arizona Diamondbacks	February 8, 2013	1 year/$800,000
Francisco Liriano	Chicago White Sox		February 8, 2013	1 year/$1 million
Brandon Inge	Oakland Athletics		February 12, 2013	1 year/$1.25 million
Michael Crotta		Washington Nationals	February 13, 2013	minor-league contract
Brett Carroll	Washington Nationals		February 16, 2013	minor-league contract
Román Colón	Kansas City Royals		February 16, 2013	minor-league contract
José Contreras	Philadelphia Phillies		February 23, 2013	minor-league contract
Jolbert Cabrera	New York Mets		March 27, 2013	minor-league contract
Jeremy Farrell		Chicago White Sox	April 5, 2013	unknown
Mike Colla		Tampa Bay Rays	June 8, 2013	unknown

=== Waivers ===
Player	Claimed from	Lost to	Date
Chad Beck		Toronto Blue Jays	January 4, 2013
Zach Stewart		Chicago White Sox	January 24, 2013
Clint Robinson		Toronto Blue Jays	March 29, 2013
Hunter Strickland	San Francisco Giants		April 2, 2013

=== Signings ===
Player	Date	Contract terms
Anderson Hernández	November 9, 2012	minor-league contract
Kris Johnson	November 9, 2012	minor-league contract
Jeff Larish	November 9, 2012	minor-league contract
Stefan Welch	November 9, 2012	minor-league contract
Wyatt Toregas	November 11, 2012	minor-league contract
Philippe Valiquette	November 26, 2012	minor-league contract
Charlie Morton	November 30, 2012	1 year/$2 million
Jason Grilli	December 10, 2012	2 year/$6.75 million
Miles Durham	January 4, 2012	unknown
Jeff Karstens	January 15, 2013	1 year/$2.5 million
Gaby Sánchez	January 18, 2013	1 year/$1.75 million
Garrett Jones	January 18, 2013	1 year/$4.5 million
Miguel Pérez	January 20, 2013	minor-league contract
James McDonald	January 31, 2013	1 year/$3.025 million
Neil Walker	January 31, 2013	1 year/$3.3 million
Devin Ivany	February 16, 2013	minor-league contract
Alex Presley	March 1, 2013	1-year contract
Andrew Oliver	March 1, 2013	1-year contract
Bryan Morris	March 1, 2013	1-year contract
Chase d'Arnaud	March 1, 2013	1 year/$493,000
Chris Leroux	March 1, 2013	1 year/$502,000
Clint Robinson	March 1, 2013	1-year contract
Duke Welker	March 1, 2013	1-year contract
Hunter Strickland	March 1, 2013	1-year contract
Jared Hughes	March 1, 2013	1 year/$542,500
Jeanmar Gómez	March 1, 2013	1 year/$500,000
Jeff Locke	March 1, 2013	1 year/$497,500
Jerry Sands	March 1, 2013	1-year contract
Jordy Mercer	March 1, 2013	1-year contract
Josh Harrison	March 1, 2013	1 year/$503,000
Justin Wilson	March 1, 2013	1 year/$493,500
Kyle McPherson	March 1, 2013	1-year contract
Mark Melancon	March 1, 2013	1 year/$493,500
Michael McKenry	March 1, 2013	1 year/$505,000
Phil Irwin	March 1, 2013	1-year contract
Starling Marte	March 1, 2013	1 year/$500,000
Stolmy Pimentel	March 1, 2013	1-year contract
Tony Sanchez	March 1, 2013	1-year contract
Tony Watson	March 1, 2013	1 year/$505,500
Travis Snider	March 1, 2013	1 year/$505,000
Vic Black	March 1, 2013	1-year contract
Vin Mazzaro	March 1, 2013	1-year contract
Kurt Yacko	April 11, 2013	minor-league contract
Jeff Gibbs	May 4, 2013	minor-league contract
Gerardo Navarro	June 1, 2013	minor-league contract
Jesus Perez	June 1, 2013	minor-league contract
Cody Dickson	June 13, 2013	Signed 2013 4th round pick ($375,000 signing bonus)
Chad Kuhl	June 13, 2013	Signed 2013 9th round pick ($145,200 signing bonus)
Beau Wallace	June 13, 2013	Signed 2013 12th round pick
Justin Topa	June 13, 2013	Signed 2013 17th round pick
Jeff Roy	June 13, 2013	Signed 2013 18th round pick
Brett McKinney	June 13, 2013	Signed 2013 19th round pick
Adam Landecker	June 13, 2013	Signed 2013 21st round pick
Cameron Griffin	June 13, 2013	Signed 2013 23rd round pick
Justin Maffei	June 13, 2013	Signed 2013 25th round pick
Michael Fransoso	June 13, 2013	Signed 2013 27th round pick
Blake Taylor	June 14, 2013	Signed 2013 2nd round pick ($750,000 signing bonus)
Trae Arbet	June 14, 2013	Signed 2013 5th round pick ($425,000 signing bonus)
Shane Carle	June 14, 2013	Signed 2013 10th round pick ($100,000 signing bonus)
Danny Collins	June 14, 2013	Signed 2013 13th round pick
Max Rossiter	June 14, 2013	Signed 2013 15th round pick
Henry Hirsch	June 17, 2013	Signed 2013 22nd round pick
José Contreras	June 17, 2013	minor-league contract
Reese McGuire	June 18, 2013	Signed 2013 1st round pick ($2,369,000 signing bonus)
Neil Kozikowski	June 21, 2013	Signed 2013 8th round pick ($425,000 signing bonus)
Austin Meadows	June 28, 2013	Signed 2013 1st round pick ($3,029,600 signing bonus)
Nick Buckner	June 29, 2013	Signed 2013 14th round pick ($135,000 signing bonus)
Billy Roth	June 29, 2013	Signed 2013 16th round pick ($190,000 signing bonus)
Will Kendall	June 29, 2013	Signed 2013 30th round pick
JaCoby Jones	July 1, 2013	Signed 2013 3rd round pick ($612,000 signing bonus)
Jerry Mulderig	July 2, 2013	Signed 2013 28th round pick
Adam Frazier	July 3, 2013	Signed 2013 6th round pick ($240,600 signing bonus)
Andrew Dennis	July 3, 2013	Signed 2013 37th round pick
Buddy Borden	July 8, 2013	Signed 2013 7th round pick ($180,400 signing bonus)
Erich Weiss	July 10, 2013	Signed 2013 11th round pick ($305,000 signing bonus)
Jeremias Portorreal	August 9, 2013	1 year/$375,000
Kelly Shoppach	August 12, 2013	minor-league contract
Luis Escobar	August 14, 2013	unknown
Kyle Farnsworth	August 16, 2013	minor-league contract

=== Other ===
Name	Date	Details
Hisanori Takahashi	October 29, 2012	Released
Dave Jauss	October 31, 2012	Hired to coaching staff
Jay Bell	October 31, 2012	Hired as hitting coach
Rick Sofield	October 31, 2012	Hired as first base coach
Carlos Berroa	November 28, 2012	Hired as professional scout
John Kosciak	November 28, 2012	Hired as professional scout
Ricky Bennett	November 28, 2012	Hired as professional scout
Ron Hopkins	November 28, 2012	Hired as professional scout
Elevys Gonzalez	December 6, 2012	lost in Rule 5 AAA draft (to Dodgers)
Tom Boleska	December 6, 2012	lost in Rule 5 AAA draft (to Orioles)
Ethan Hollingsworth	December 6, 2012	claimed in Rule 5 AAA draft (from Royals)
Rick VandenHurk	January 5, 2013	Released
Clint Hurdle	February 18, 2013	Re-signed to a 1-year contract extension
Wyatt Toregas	February 22, 2013	Released
Aaron Poreda	March 12, 2013	Released
Brad Hawpe	March 23, 2013	Released
Jeremy Farrell	April 7, 2013	Released
Alex Valdez	April 19, 2013	Released
Jonathan Sánchez	May 8, 2013	Released
José Contreras	July 18, 2013	Released
Brandon Inge	July 30, 2013	Released
Kelly Shoppach	August 28, 2013	Released

== Draft picks ==
2013 Top 10 Rounds Draft Picks
Round	Pick	Player	Position	School	Signed
1	9	Austin Meadows	CF	Grayson HS	June 28, 2013
1	14	Reese McGuire	C	Kentwood HS	June 18, 2013
2	51	Blake Taylor	LHP	Dana Hills HS	June 14, 2013
3	87	JaCoby Jones	CF	LSU	July 1, 2013
4	119	Cody Dickson	LHP	Sam Houston State	June 13, 2013
5	149	Trae Arbet	SS	Great Oak HS	June 14, 2013
6	179	Adam Frazier	SS	Mississippi State	July 3, 2013
7	209	Buddy Borden	RHP	UNLV	July 8, 2013
8	239	Neil Kozikowski	RHP	Avon Old Farms School	June 21, 2013
9	269	Chad Kuhl	RHP	Delaware	June 13, 2013
10	299	Shane Carle	RHP	Long Beach State	June 14, 2013

== Farm system ==
Level	Team	League	Manager
AAA	Indianapolis Indians	International League	Dean Treanor
AA	Altoona Curve	Eastern League	Carlos García
A	Bradenton Marauders	Florida State League	Frank Kremblas
A	West Virginia Power	South Atlantic League	Michael Ryan
A-Short Season	Jamestown Jammers	New York–Penn League	Dave Turgeon
Rookie	GCL Pirates	Gulf Coast League	Milver Reyes
Rookie	DSL Pirates 1	Dominican Summer League	Gerardo Alvarez
Rookie	DSL Pirates 2	Dominican Summer League	Keoni De Renne
