= Josh Harrison =

American baseball player (born 1987)

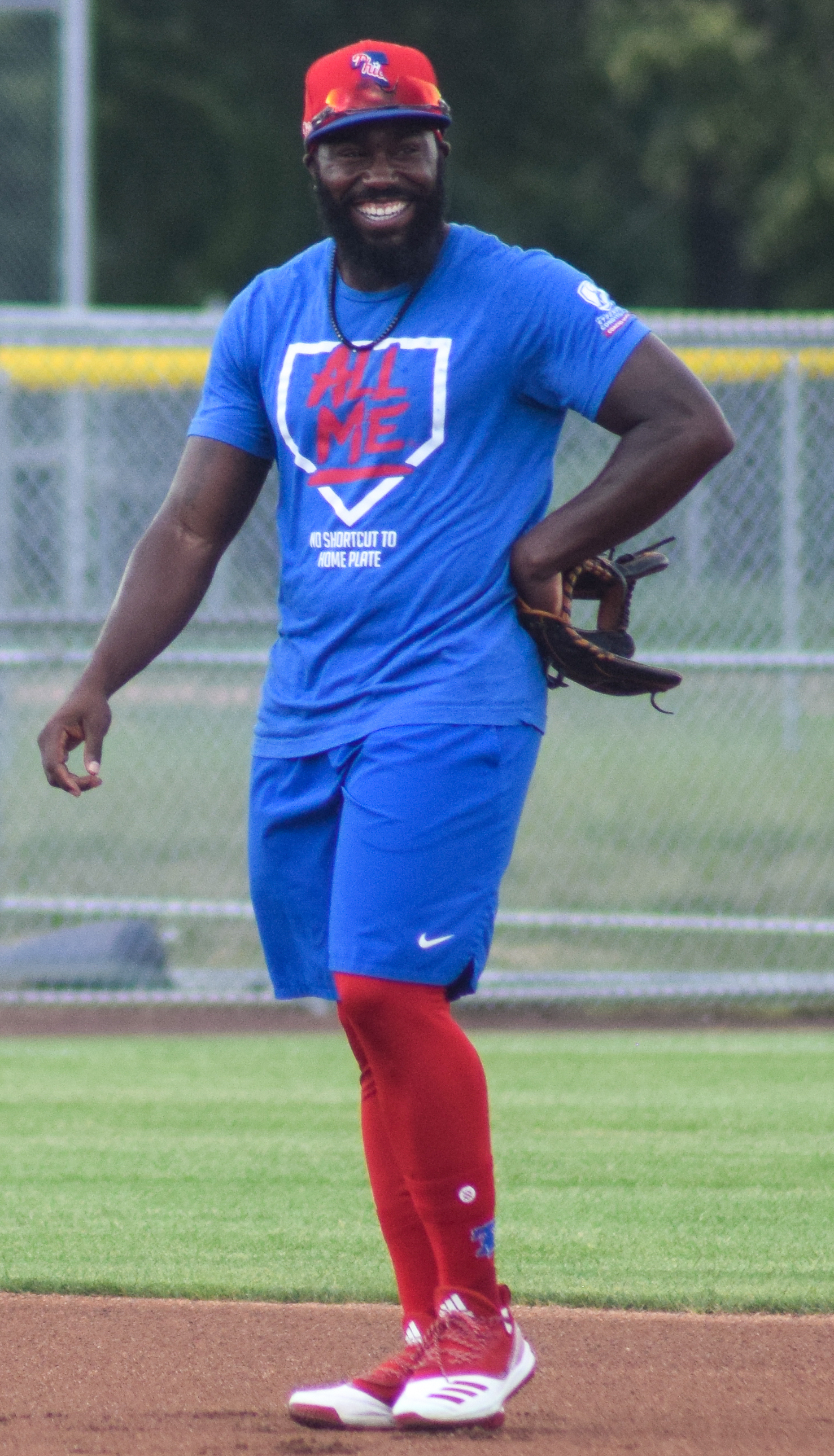
- Harrison with the Philadelphia Phillies in 2020
- Second baseman / Third baseman
- Born: July 8, 1987 (age 39); Cincinnati, Ohio, U.S.
- Batted: Right Threw: Right

MLB debut
- May 31, 2011, for the Pittsburgh Pirates

Last MLB appearance
- July 30, 2023, for the Philadelphia Phillies

MLB statistics
- Batting average: .270
- Home runs: 73
- Runs batted in: 388
- Stats at Baseball Reference

Teams
- Pittsburgh Pirates (2011–2018); Detroit Tigers (2019); Washington Nationals (2020–2021); Oakland Athletics (2021); Chicago White Sox (2022); Philadelphia Phillies (2023)

Career highlights and awards
- 2× All-Star (2014, 2017)
Medals
Men's baseball
Representing United States
World Baseball Classic
| Gold medal – first place | 2017 Los Angeles | Team |

Joshua Isaiah Harrison (born July 8, 1987) is an American former professional baseball utility player. He played in Major League Baseball (MLB) for the Pittsburgh Pirates, Detroit Tigers, Washington Nationals, Oakland Athletics, Chicago White Sox, and Philadelphia Phillies. Harrison is a two-time MLB All-Star. Internationally, Harrison represents the United States. In the 2017 World Baseball Classic (WBC), he helped win Team USA's first gold medal in a WBC tournament.

== Early life and career ==
Harrison began playing tee ball at the age of three years. Before playing in organized baseball, Harrison displayed interest in the game. Using a fork from his home's kitchen as a bat and a balled-up piece of paper, Harrison played makeshift baseball with his older brother, Vince, who pitched the paper to him.

Harrison played shortstop at Princeton High School in Sharonville, Ohio. Harrison enrolled at the University of Cincinnati, and played college baseball for the Cincinnati Bearcats as a second baseman. In 2006, he was a middle infielder for the Cincinnati Steam of the Great Lakes Summer Collegiate League. In 2007, he played collegiate summer baseball with the Cotuit Kettleers of the Cape Cod Baseball League. In 2008, Harrison was named the Big East Conference's Co-Player of the Year, while batting .378.

== Professional career ==
=== Chicago Cubs ===
The Chicago Cubs selected Harrison in the sixth round (191st overall) of the 2008 MLB draft. He became the first Bearcat drafted in the first ten rounds since Kevin Youkilis was taken in the eighth round of the 2001 draft by the Boston Red Sox.

In 2008 and 2009, Harrison made three stops in the Cubs’ farm system: Low–A Boise Hawks, Single–A Peoria Chiefs, and High–A Daytona Cubs.

=== Pittsburgh Pirates ===
On July 30, 2009, the Cubs traded Harrison, along with Kevin Hart, and José Ascanio to the Pittsburgh Pirates for pitchers John Grabow and Tom Gorzelanny.

Harrison had his contract purchased by the Pirates on May 30, 2011. He made his MLB debut on May 31, 2011, and recorded his first MLB hit, off New York Mets pitcher R. A. Dickey. On May 18, 2012, Harrison broke up Justin Verlander's no-hitter in the ninth inning, which would have been the third no-hitter of Verlander's career.

Harrison was optioned to the Triple-A Indianapolis Indians on April 14, 2013. He was recalled on May 7 when James McDonald was placed on the disabled list. Harrison was optioned back to Indianapolis on May 8 when Duke Welker was recalled. Harrison was optioned back to Indianapolis on May 31.

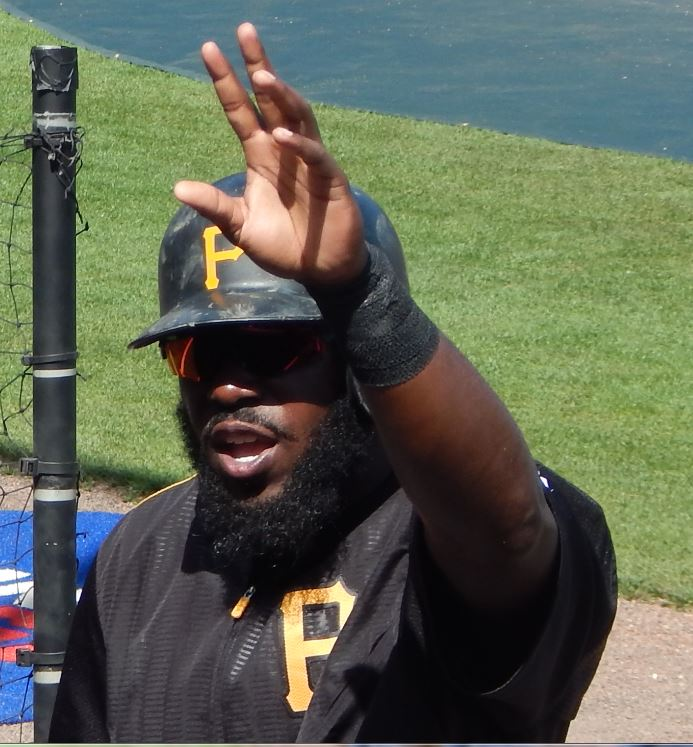
Josh Harrison waves to fans before a spring training game in March 2016

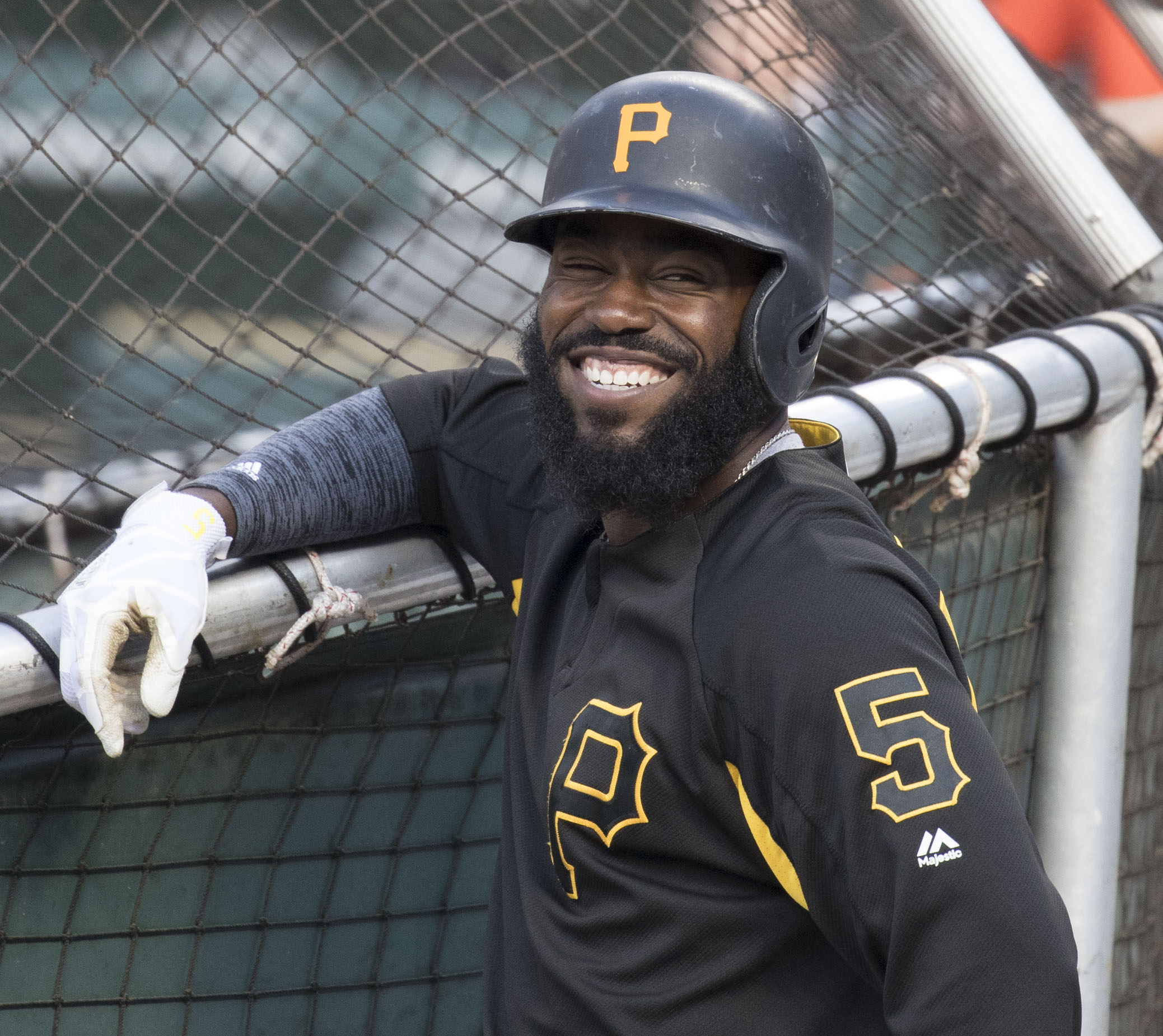
Josh Harrison with the Pirates in 2017

On July 6, 2014, Harrison was selected to his first career All-Star Game, along with teammates Andrew McCutchen and Tony Watson. At the time of his selection, Harrison was hitting .298 through 72 games. He had played 5 different positions throughout the season, and was listed as a utility player for the All-Star Game.

Despite his role as a utility player throughout the 2014 season, Harrison played in 143 games and logged enough at bats to qualify for the National League (NL) batting title. Finishing the season with a .315 batting average, he came in second to Justin Morneau of the Colorado Rockies. Morneau won the title with a .319 average after sitting out the team's final two games, one of which lasted twelve innings.

Harrison continued to play multiple positions for the Pirates. He spent most of his time at third base following Pedro Álvarez's move to 1st Base. Harrison finished 2014 with the best statistics of his career with a .315 batting average (second in the NL), 13 home runs, 52 runs batted in, and finished ninth in voting for NL MVP.

Harrison began the 2015 season as the starting third baseman for the Pirates, agreeing to a four-year contract extension through 2018, with club options for 2019 and 2020, shortly after the season's start.

Following the 2015 season, the Pirates' regular starting Second baseman, Neil Walker, was traded to the New York Mets. Harrison then became the starting second baseman for the 2016 season.

Over the course of two games on April 16, 2017, against the Chicago Cubs and April 17, 2017, against the St. Louis Cardinals, Harrison was hit by a pitch in four consecutive plate appearances. He was the first batter with four consecutive hit by pitches since at least 1974.

On August 23, 2017, against the Los Angeles Dodgers, Harrison became the first player in MLB history to break up a no-hitter in extra innings with a walk-off home run. The home run was hit in the tenth inning, off of pitcher Rich Hill, to give the Pirates a 1–0 win. On September 3, 2017, Harrison went on the disabled list due to a fracture of the fifth metacarpal on his left hand.

On April 15, 2018, Harrison was hit by a pitch on the left hand and left the game. The next day, on April 16, he was ruled out for 6 weeks due to a fracture of the fifth metacarpal, a similar injury he suffered last September. The Pirates declined his 2019 contract option and made him a free agent on October 31, 2018.

=== Detroit Tigers ===
On February 23, 2019, Harrison signed a one-year contract with the Detroit Tigers. Upon joining the team, he switched his number to 1 to honor former second baseman Lou Whitaker. Harrison batted .176 in 36 games before he strained a hamstring in May. The Tigers released him on August 9, while he was still rehabilitating from the injury.

=== Philadelphia Phillies ===
On November 26, 2019, Harrison signed a minor league contract with the Philadelphia Phillies. On July 21, 2020, Harrison requested and was granted his release from the Phillies.

=== Washington Nationals ===
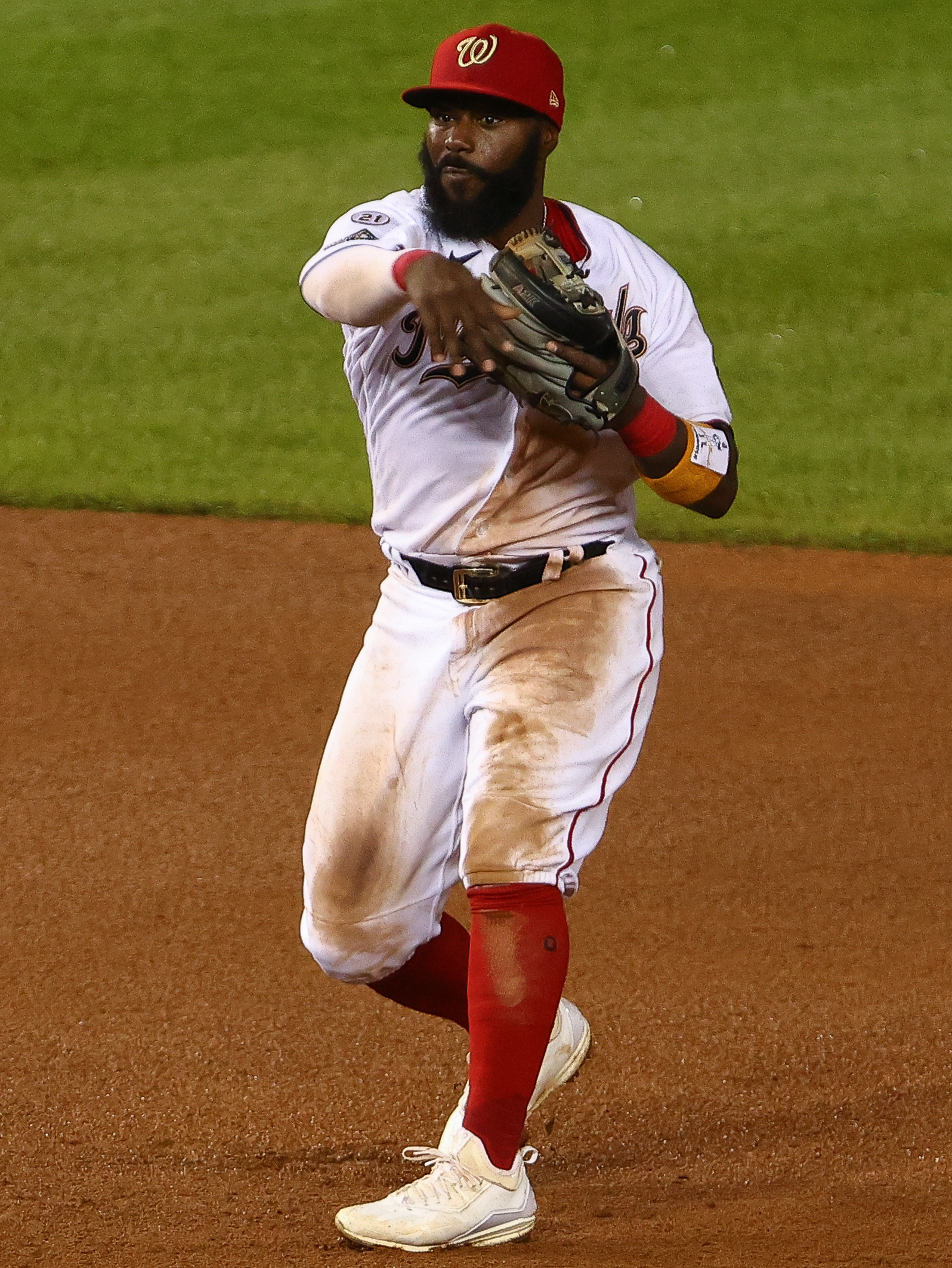
Harrison with the Washington Nationals in 2020

On July 27, 2020, Harrison signed a one-year major league contract with the Washington Nationals. On the season, Harrison improved greatly upon his 2019 season, slashing .278/.352/.418 with three home runs and 14 RBI in 33 games for Washington. On October 22, 2020, Harrison re–signed with the Nationals on a one-year contract.

=== Oakland Athletics ===
On July 30, 2021, Harrison was traded to the Oakland Athletics along with Yan Gomes in exchange for Drew Millas, Richard Guasch, and Seth Shuman. He finished the 2021 season slashing .279/.341/.400 with 8 home runs and 60 RBIs in 138 games between the Nationals and the Athletics.

=== Chicago White Sox ===
On March 15, 2022, Harrison signed a one-year, $5.5 million contract with a 2023 club option with the Chicago White Sox. The White Sox declined his option on November 7, 2022.

=== Philadelphia Phillies (second stint) ===
On January 30, 2023, Harrison signed a one-year, $2 million contract with the Philadelphia Phillies. In 41 games for Philadelphia, he batted .204/.263/.291 with 2 home runs and 10 RBI. On August 1, Harrison was designated for assignment by the Phillies following the acquisition of Michael Lorenzen. The next day, he was released by the team.

=== Texas Rangers ===
On August 15, 2023, Harrison signed a minor league contract with the Texas Rangers organization. In 6 games for the Triple–A Round Rock Express, Harrison went 6–for–27 (.222) with 1 home run and 5 RBI. Harrison opted out of his contract on August 25.

=== Cincinnati Reds ===
On February 5, 2024, Harrison signed a minor league contract with the Cincinnati Reds. He failed to make the club and opted out of his deal on March 18.

On May 31, 2025, Harrison announced his retirement from professional baseball.

On August 8, 2026, Harrison signed a one day contract with the Pittsburgh Pirates and subsequently retired as a member of the Pirates organization.

== International career ==
Harrison was selected to the United States national baseball team at the 2017 World Baseball Classic.

== Personal life ==
Harrison is the nephew of former major league outfielder and coach John Shelby. Harrison's brother, Vince Harrison, played minor league baseball from 2001 to 2011, before joining the Pirates organization as a player-coach.

Beginning in 2014, Harrison started a youth baseball camp for kids and teens in Cincinnati. Harrison's brother Vince also sponsors and helps with the event.

Harrison and his wife, Brittney, have two daughters; one born in 2014, and one born in 2017.
