= Tony Sanchez (baseball) =

American baseball player (born 1988)

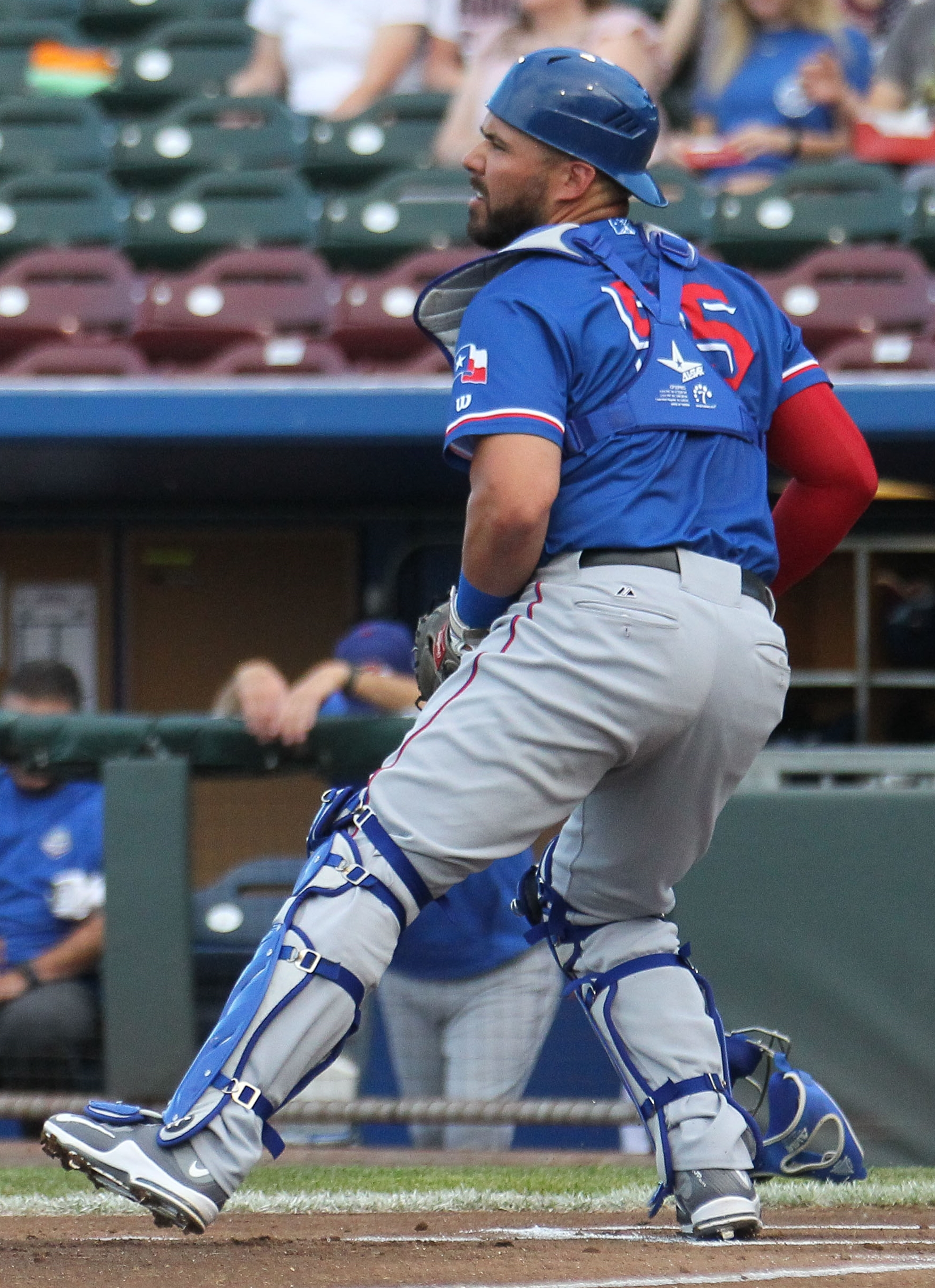
- Sanchez with the Round Rock Express
- Catcher
- Born: May 20, 1988 (age 38); Miami, Florida, U.S.
- Batted: Right Threw: Right

MLB debut
- June 23, 2013, for the Pittsburgh Pirates

Last MLB appearance
- September 2, 2017, for the Atlanta Braves

MLB statistics
- Batting average: .257
- Home runs: 4
- Runs batted in: 18
- Stats at Baseball Reference

Teams
- Pittsburgh Pirates (2013–2015); Atlanta Braves (2017)

Jorge Anthony Sanchez (born May 20, 1988) is an American former professional baseball catcher. He played in Major League Baseball (MLB) from 2013 to 2017 for the Pittsburgh Pirates and Atlanta Braves.

== Early career ==
=== High school ===
A native of Miami, Florida, Sanchez was a three-time All-Dade County selection at Miami Killian Senior High School. He was team captain in 2005 and 2006, and led his team in every offensive category in 2006. Killian advanced to the Florida state finals in 2004 and 2005.

=== College ===
Sanchez has established himself as one of the most prolific hitters in Boston College Eagles baseball history. He ranks fifth all-time in home runs with 24 and runs batted in (RBI) with 124, sixth in hits with 202 and eighth in runs with 125.

In 2008, he played collegiate summer baseball in the Cape Cod Baseball League for the Yarmouth-Dennis Red Sox and was named a league all-star.

In 2009, Sanchez ranked eighth in the Atlantic Coast Conference (ACC) in runs (63), ninth in home runs (14), tenth in doubles (19) and slugging percentage (.614), twelfth in total bases (140), 16th in batting (.346) and 17th in hits (79) and on-base percentage (.443). He has also thrown out the most runners in the conference this season, catching opponents stealing 19 times. His 63 runs this season are a Boston College single-season record breaking the previous record of 60 runs held by Steve Langone and Sean McGowan which has held since 1999. His 14 home runs are the third-most in a single season and his 79 hits are fourth.

Sanchez is one of three finalists for the 2009 Johnny Bench Award, presented to the nation's top collegiate catcher as well as being named to the 2009 Louisville Slugger All-America Third Team and tabbed as one of 30 semifinalists for the Golden Spikes Award, presented to the nation's premier amateur baseball player. He was also the first player from Boston College to be voted to the All-ACC First Team. He also played for the Battle Creek Bombers of the Northwoods League.

== Professional career ==
=== Pittsburgh Pirates ===
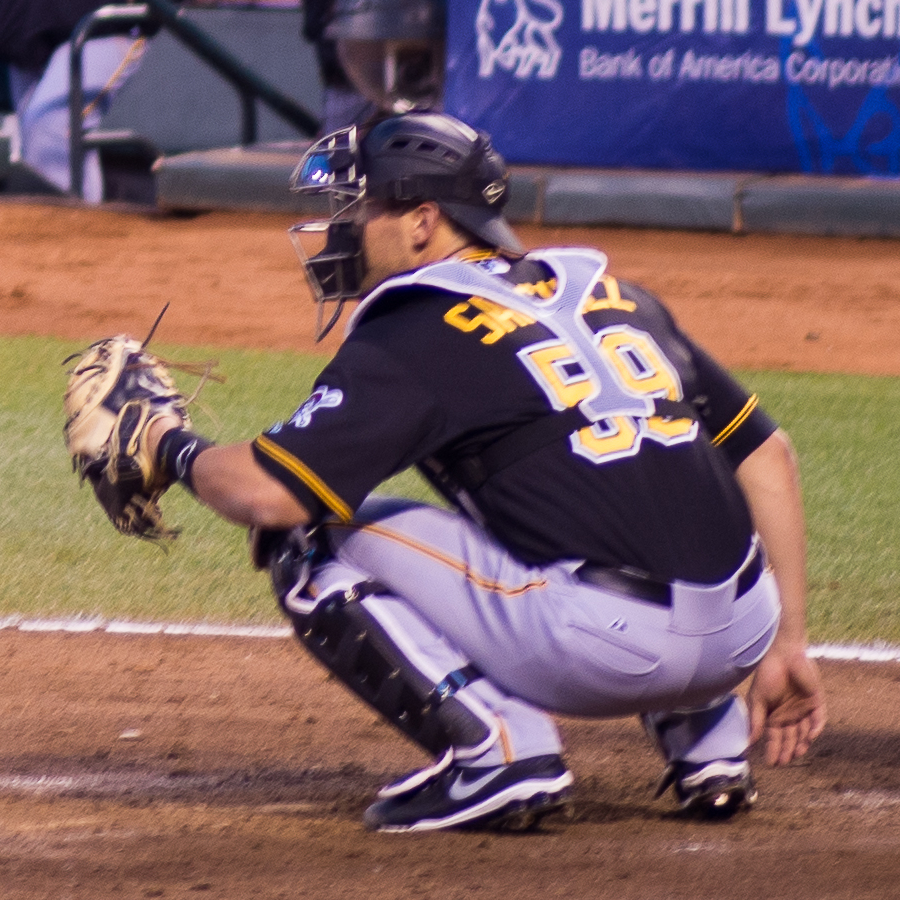
Sanchez with the Pirates in 2013

Sanchez was selected 4th overall in the 2009 MLB draft by the Pittsburgh Pirates, and became just the third catcher out of Boston College to be selected in the MLB Draft, and also the highest draft pick in Boston College history.

Sanchez made his professional debut for the Low-A State College Spikes on June 20, 2009. He played in four games for the Spikes before being promoted to the Single-A West Virginia Power. Sanchez finished the 2009 season with the High-A Lynchburg Hillcats, and in 48 combined games that year, hit .309 with 7 home runs and 48 RBI. He played the entire 2010 season with the Bradenton Marauders, catching the inaugural game with the Pirates' new High-A affiliate. In 59 games, Sanchez batted .314 with four home runs and 35 RBI. In the offseason he played in 18 games for the Mesa Solar Sox of the Arizona Fall League (AFL), batting .206 with four home runs and nine RBI.

Continuing his progression through the minor leagues, Sanchez played the 2011 season with the Double-A Altoona Curve. In a career-high 118 games, he hit .241 with five home runs and 44 RBI. Sanchez split time in the 2012 season with Altoona and the Triple-A Indianapolis Indians. He would bat .251 with eight home runs and 43 RBI in 102 combined games. On November 20, 2012, the Pirates added Sanchez to their 40-man roster to protect him from the Rule 5 draft.

On June 21, 2013, Sanchez was officially recalled to the Pittsburgh Pirates. He recorded his first Major League hit on June 23 – a double off of the Angels right hander Joe Blanton. The ball that Sanchez hit got stuck in the scoreboard, and after the Pirates finished batting, officials went out and retrieved the ball. He would appear in 22 games with the Pirates in 2013, hitting .233 with two home runs and five RBI. In the minor leagues that year, Sanchez hit .282 with 10 home runs and 42 RBI. 2014 again saw Sanchez split time between the Major and minor leagues. He would play in 26 games for the Pirates, and bat .267 with two home runs and 13 RBI. In Triple-A Indianapolis, Sanchez batted .235 with 11 home runs and 45 RBI. During the offseason, he appeared in 10 games for the Toros del Este of the Dominican Winter League.

Sanchez played the majority of the 2015 season in Indianapolis, hitting .236 with three home runs and 47 RBI in 94 games. He played just 3 MLB games for the Pirates in 2015, batting .375. On January 6, 2016, Sanchez was designated for assignment by the Pirates. He was released by the organization on January 13.

=== Toronto Blue Jays ===
On February 19, 2016, Sanchez signed a minor league contract with the Toronto Blue Jays that included an invitation to spring training. He was released on July 28.

=== San Francisco Giants ===
Sanchez signed a minor league contract with the San Francisco Giants on August 3, 2016. He played in 16 games for the Triple–A Sacramento River Cats, hitting .200/.317/.340 with two home runs and five RBI. Sanchez was promoted to the major leagues on September 27. He did not appear in a game for the Giants, and was outrighted off of the roster on November 3. Sanchez elected free agency on November 7.

=== Los Angeles Angels of Anaheim ===
On December 2, 2016, Sanchez signed a minor league contract with the Los Angeles Angels of Anaheim.

=== Atlanta Braves ===
On August 31, 2017, Sanchez was traded to the Braves for Brandon Phillips. On September 2, in his only appearance with the Braves, Sanchez struck out in a pinch hit at-bat. Sanchez became a free agent on October 24.

=== Cincinnati Reds ===
On February 25, 2018, Sanchez signed a minor league deal with the Cincinnati Reds.

=== Texas Rangers ===
On April 16, 2018, Sanchez was traded to the Texas Rangers for a player to be named later or cash. In 62 games for the Triple–A Round Rock Express, he batted .300/.353/.455 with seven home runs and 31 RBI. Sanchez elected free agency following the season on November 2.

Sanchez re-signed with the Rangers on a minor league contract on January 22, 2019. He was assigned to Double–A Frisco RoughRiders for the 2019 season, hitting .246/.316/.346 with 4 home runs and 31 RBI. Sanchez elected free agency following the season on November 4.
