= Ryan Reid (baseball) =

American baseball player (born 1985)

- Pitcher
- Born: April 24, 1985 (age 41); Portland, Maine, U.S.
- Batted: Left Threw: Right

MLB debut
- June 3, 2013, for the Pittsburgh Pirates

Last MLB appearance
- July 4, 2013, for the Pittsburgh Pirates

MLB statistics
- Win–loss record: 0–0
- Earned run average: 1.64
- Strikeouts: 7
- Stats at Baseball Reference

Teams
- Pittsburgh Pirates (2013)

Ryan Allen Reid (born April 24, 1985) is an American former professional baseball pitcher. He played in Major League Baseball (MLB) for the Pittsburgh Pirates in 2013. Mainly, Reid worked as a relief pitcher for these major teams.

== Early life and amateur career ==
Reid was born and raised in Portland, Maine. He played baseball at Deering High School with fellow future Major League Baseball player Ryan Flaherty. Reid played college baseball at James Madison University for the Dukes. In 2006, he set a school record with 124 strikeouts in a season, beating the record set by Scott Forster 22 years earlier by a margin of 19.

== Career ==
=== Tampa Bay Rays ===
The Tampa Bay Devil Rays drafted Reid in the seventh round (199th overall) of the 2006 Major League Baseball draft. After seven seasons with the Rays, Reid became a free agent.

=== Pittsburgh Pirates ===
The Pittsburgh Pirates signed Reid to a minor league contract after the 2012 season with an invitation to spring training as a non-roster player. He started the 2013 season with the Triple-A Indianapolis Indians. The Pirates promoted Reid to the major leagues on June 3, 2013, and he made his major league debut that day. Over the course of seven games From June 3 through July 4 that season, Reid pitched 11 innings for the Pirates. These would prove to be the only 11 innings of Reid’s major league career. He was optioned back to Indianapolis on July 7 when A. J. Burnett returned from the disabled list.

Reid was designated for assignment by the Pirates on December 13, 2013, following the signings of Edinson Vólquez and Clint Barmes.

=== New York Mets ===
On December 23, 2013, Reid was claimed off waivers by the New York Mets. On April 2, 2014, Reid was removed from the 40-man roster and sent outright to the Triple-A Las Vegas 51s. In 48 relief appearances for Las Vegas, he posted a 5-2 record and 4.91 ERA with 56 strikeouts and four saves across 69 2/3 innings pitched.

=== Miami Marlins ===
On November 14, 2014, Reid signed a minor league contract with the Miami Marlins. He was a non-roster invitee to training camp in 2015, but did not make the final roster. Reid missed the entirety of the 2015 season after undergoing Tommy John surgery.

Reid returned to action in 2016, recording a 1.04 ERA across six appearances for the High-A Jupiter Hammerheads. He was released by the Marlins organization on May 28, 2016.

=== Somerset Patriots ===
On June 6, 2016, Reid signed with the Somerset Patriots of the Atlantic League of Professional Baseball. He made 14 scoreless appearances for the Patriots, recording nine strikeouts across 14 1/3 innings pitched.
