= Garrett Jones =

American baseball player (born 1981)

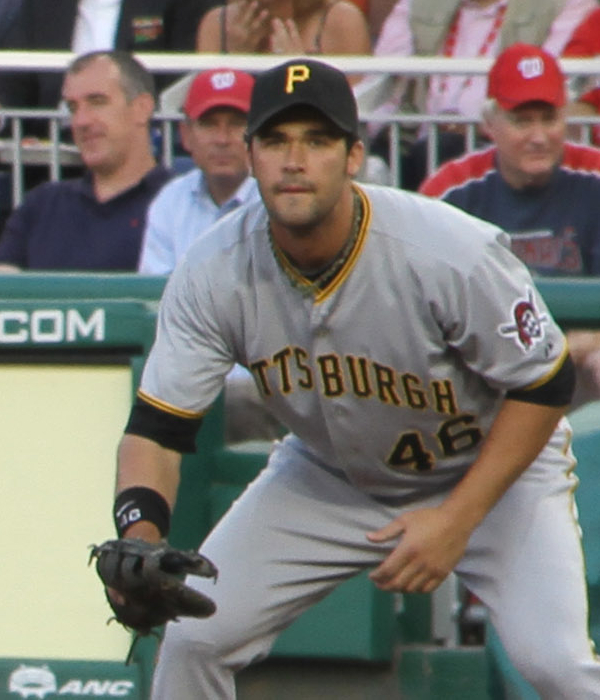
- Jones with the Pittsburgh Pirates
- First baseman / Right fielder
- Born: June 21, 1981 (age 45); Harvey, Illinois, U.S.
- Batted: Left Threw: Left

Professional debut
- MLB: May 15, 2007, for the Minnesota Twins
- NPB: March 25, 2016, for the Yomiuri Giants

Last appearance
- MLB: July 29, 2015, for the New York Yankees
- NPB: 2016, for the Yomiuri Giants

MLB statistics
- Batting average: .251
- Home runs: 122
- Runs batted in: 400

NPB statistics
- Batting average: .258
- Home runs: 24
- Runs batted in: 68
- Stats at Baseball Reference

Teams
- Minnesota Twins (2007); Pittsburgh Pirates (2009–2013); Miami Marlins (2014); New York Yankees (2015); Yomiuri Giants (2016)

Garrett Thomas Jones (born June 21, 1981) is an American former professional baseball first baseman and right fielder. He played in Major League Baseball (MLB) for the Minnesota Twins, Pittsburgh Pirates, Miami Marlins, and New York Yankees, and in Nippon Professional Baseball (NPB) for the Yomiuri Giants.

== High school ==
In 1999, Jones graduated from Victor J. Andrew High School in Tinley Park, Illinois.

== Professional career ==
=== Atlanta Braves ===
Jones was drafted by the Atlanta Braves in the 14th round of the 1999 Major League Baseball draft. Jones started his pro career with the GCL Braves in 1999. Jones played for the Danville Braves in 2000 and 2001. In May 2002, Jones was released after three seasons in the Braves' minor league system.

=== Minnesota Twins ===
Jones signed with the Minnesota Twins on May 24, 2002. In 2002, Jones played for the Quad Cities River Bandits. In 2003, Jones played for the Fort Myers Miracle. Jones split the 2004 season with Fort Myers and the New Britain Rock Cats. From 2005–2008, he played for the Rochester Red Wings, the Twins' AAA affiliate. On May 15, 2007, Jones made his major league debut, recording his first hit in the seventh inning, a single off Cleveland Indians pitcher Paul Byrd.

Jones appeared in 31 games with the Twins in 2007. Jones became a free agent at the end of the 2008 season.

=== Pittsburgh Pirates ===
Jones signed a minor league contract with the Pittsburgh Pirates on December 16, 2008. On June 30, 2009, Jones' contract was purchased by the Pirates, and he was called up to take the roster spot that was vacated when Eric Hinske was traded. On July 17, 2009, in a game against the San Francisco Giants, Jones hit a home run in the first inning off Tim Lincecum, then ended the game in the 14th inning with his second home run of the game, off Bob Howry, to give the Pirates a 2–1 walk-off win. After being called up to the Pirates MLB roster, Jones hit ten home runs in his first month with the club and was named the National League's Rookie of the Month for July 2009. Jones became the first to hit seven home runs in his first twelve games with the Pirates since Dino Restelli in the 1949 season. Jones's 10 home runs in July 2009 made him the first Pirate to hit 10 home runs in a month since Jason Bay in May 2006 and the first Pirate to hit 10 home runs in a July since Donn Clendenon in 1966.

On April 5, 2010, against the Los Angeles Dodgers, Jones hit two home runs in his first two at bats, becoming the sixth Pirate to hit two home runs on Opening Day. While the first was long into right field, landing in the Allegheny River, the second cleared the left field wall. On May 14 of that same year, Jones and Andrew McCutchen each collected five hits in the Pirates' 10–6 victory over the Chicago Cubs. It was the first time since 1970 that Pirate teammates had collected five hits in the same game; that year, Willie Stargell and Bob Robertson had accomplished this feat. He finished the 2010 season with 145 hits, 64 runs, 34 doubles, one triple, 21 home runs, 86 RBIs, 53 walks, 123 strikeouts, 7 stolen bases, .247 batting average, .306 OBP, and .414 slugging percentage in 592 at bats.

On June 2, 2013, Jones became the second player and first Pirate to hit a home run out of PNC Park and into the Allegheny River on the fly.

On November 25, 2013, Jones was designated for assignment to make room for Jaff Decker. On December 2, he was non-tendered by Pittsburgh, becoming a free agent.

=== Miami Marlins ===
Jones signed a two-year contract worth $7.5 million with the Miami Marlins. The deal was finalized on December 13, 2013.

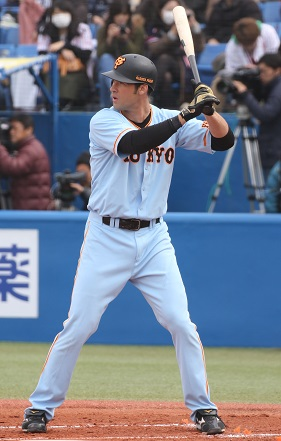
Jones with the Yomiuri Giants

In 2014, Jones hit .246 in 146 games with 15 home runs and 53 RBIs.

=== New York Yankees ===
On December 19, 2014, the Marlins traded Jones to the New York Yankees, along with Nathan Eovaldi and Domingo Germán, for Martin Prado and David Phelps. After he hit .215 with 5 home runs and 17 RBI, the Yankees designated Jones for assignment on July 31, after acquiring Dustin Ackley. However, Ackley injured his back days later, and Jones re-signed with the Yankees on August 5 after he cleared waivers. The Yankees designated Jones for assignment again on August 12, with Jones not appearing in any games since his return to the Yankees. He was released on August 20.

=== Yomiuri Giants ===
During the 2015–16 offseason, Jones signed a one-year contract with the Yomiuri Giants of Nippon Professional Baseball's Central League worth $2.8 million. He then returned for another season with Yomiuri.

== Personal life ==
Jones met his wife Cassie in 2009 and were married in January 2013; the couple has one son Jaxon Jones. Cassie is the cousin of former MLB player and current Chicago Cubs broadcaster Ron Coomer.
