= Phil Irwin =

American baseball player (born 1987)

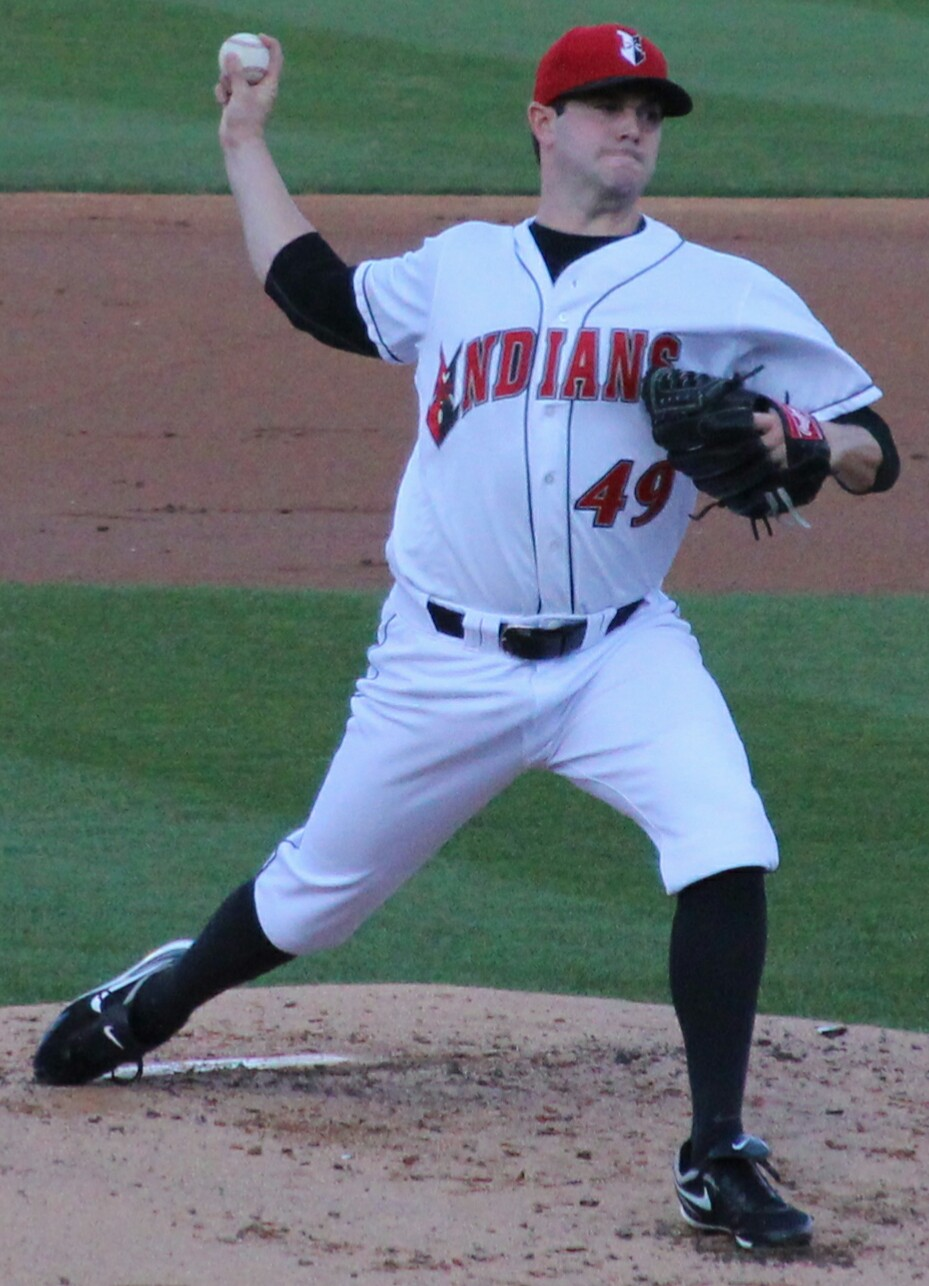
- Irwin with the Indianapolis Indians in 2012
- Pitcher
- Born: February 25, 1987 (age 39); Germantown, Tennessee
- Batted: Right Threw: Right

Professional debut
- MLB: April 14, 2013, for the Pittsburgh Pirates
- KBO: March 28, 2015, for the KT Wiz

Last appearance
- MLB: July 8, 2014, for the Texas Rangers
- KBO: June 25, 2015, for the KT Wiz

MLB statistics
- Win–loss record: 0–1
- Earned run average: 7.27
- Strikeouts: 6

KBO statistics
- Win–loss record: 1–7
- Earned run average: 8.68
- Strikeouts: 41
- Stats at Baseball Reference

Teams
- Pittsburgh Pirates (2013); Texas Rangers (2014); KT Wiz (2015)

Phillip Andrew Irwin (born February 25, 1987) is an American former professional baseball pitcher. He played in Major League Baseball (MLB) for the Pittsburgh Pirates and the Texas Rangers, and in the KBO League for the KT Wiz.

== Amateur career ==
Irwin attended Christian Brothers High School in Memphis, Tennessee. At Christian Brothers, Irwin was on the baseball and bowling teams, winning state championships in bowling in 2003 and 2004 and a state championship in baseball in 2005. Irwin attended the University of Mississippi.

== Professional career ==
=== Pittsburgh Pirates ===
Irwin was drafted by the Pittsburgh Pirates in the 21st Round of the 2009 Major League Baseball draft. In 2009, Irwin pitched for the State College Spikes. In 2010, he pitched for the West Virginia Power. In 2011, he pitched for the Bradenton Marauders and the Altoona Curve. In 2012, he pitched for Bradenton, Altoona and the Indianapolis Indians. In November 2012, Irwin was added to the 40-man roster to protect him from the Rule 5 draft.

Irwin made his major league debut on April 14, 2013.

Irwin had ulnar nerve transposition surgery on his right-elbow on July 3, 2013, shortly after returning to the AAA Indians. He subsequently pitched for the Scottsdale Scorpions in the Arizona Fall League during October and November 2013, making four appearances totaling 11 2/3 innings pitched while striking out 11.

On May 22, 2014, the Pirates designated Irwin for assignment.

=== Texas Rangers ===
On May 28, 2014, Irwin was claimed off waivers by the Texas Rangers, and optioned to the Triple-A Round Rock Express. He was recalled by the Rangers on July 8 to start that night's game against the Houston Astros. He was released by the Rangers on August 29, 2014.

=== KT Wiz ===
Irwin signed a contract with the KT Wiz of the Korean Professional Baseball League for the 2015 season worth $550,000. The Wiz released Irwin in June 2015, after he pitched to a 1–7 record with an 8.68 earned run average in 12 games.

=== Second stint with Rangers ===
Irwin signed a minor league deal with the Texas Rangers on July 31, 2015. He became a free agent on November 7, 2015.
