= Duke Welker =

American baseball player (born 1986)

- Pitcher
- Born: February 10, 1986 (age 40); Kirkland, Washington
- Batted: Left Threw: Right

MLB debut
- June 23, 2013, for the Pittsburgh Pirates

Last appearance
- June 25, 2013, for the Pittsburgh Pirates

MLB statistics
- Win–loss record: 0–0
- Earned run average: 0.00
- Strikeouts: 1
- WHIP: 0.00
- Stats at Baseball Reference

Teams
- Pittsburgh Pirates (2013)

Matthew Scott "Duke" Welker (born February 10, 1986) is a former professional baseball player who pitched in two games for the Pittsburgh Pirates in 2013

== High school and college ==
Welker attended Woodinville High School in Woodinville, Washington. He was drafted by the Seattle Mariners in the 34th round (1,023rd overall) in the 2004 Major League Baseball (MLB) draft, but chose to attend Seminole State College. He was drafted by the Mariners again, this time in the 39th round (1,163rd overall) of the 2005 MLB draft, but he did not sign again. He played for the Anchorage Glacier Pilots in the Alaska Baseball League in 2006. In August 2006, he transferred to the University of Arkansas, where he played college baseball for the Arkansas Razorbacks baseball team in the Southeastern Conference.

== Professional career ==
The Pittsburgh Pirates drafted Welker in the second round, with the 68th overall selection of the 2007 MLB draft. He signed with the team on June 17. The Pirates initially planned to keep Welker as a starting pitcher. He struggled in his first professional seasons, before achieving better results. Welker was added to the Pirates' 40-man roster to protect him from the Rule 5 draft after the 2011 season.

Welker was called up by the Pirates from the Triple-A Indianapolis Indians on May 8, 2013. He was optioned back to Indianapolis on May 11. Welker was called up again on June 20, and made his major league debut three days later, against the Los Angeles Angels, pitching a scoreless eighth inning in relief. He threw 1 1/3 scoreless innings in all for the Pirates before being optioned back to the minors. He maintained a 3–4 record and a 3.25 ERA in 61 innings (41 games) with 9 saves and 64 strikeouts while in Triple-A.

On August 31, Welker was announced as the probable player to be named later traded to the Twins (along with Alex Presley) for Justin Morneau. Because Welker was on the Pirates' 40-man roster, he was not officially traded to the Twins until October 5. On November 19, Welker was traded back to the Pirates in exchange for LHP Kris Johnson.

Welker had Tommy John surgery on June 5, 2014. He was released by the Pirates on July 14.

On April 15, 2016, Welker signed a minor league deal with the San Francisco Giants. He was released on August 2.

== Scouting report ==
Welker's fastball could reach 96 miles per hour (154 km/h).
