= Alex Presley =

American baseball player (born 1985)

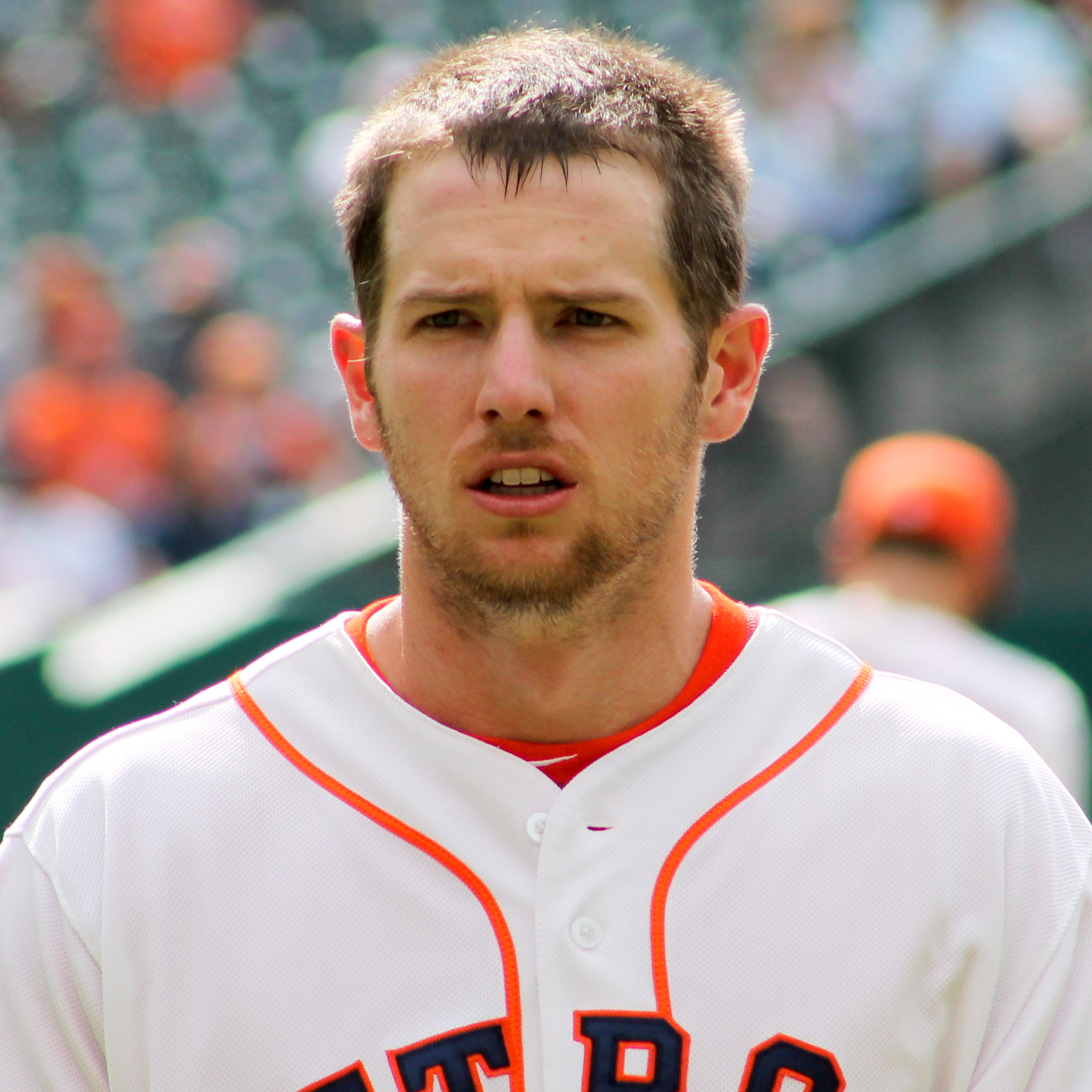
- Presley with the Houston Astros
- Outfielder
- Born: July 25, 1985 (age 41); Monroe, Louisiana, U.S.
- Batted: Left Threw: Left

MLB debut
- September 8, 2010, for the Pittsburgh Pirates

Last MLB appearance
- October 1, 2017, for the Detroit Tigers

MLB statistics
- Batting average: .263
- Home runs: 29
- Runs batted in: 111
- Stats at Baseball Reference

Teams
- Pittsburgh Pirates (2010–2013); Minnesota Twins (2013); Houston Astros (2014–2015); Milwaukee Brewers (2016); Detroit Tigers (2016–2017)

Alexander Crawford Presley (born July 25, 1985) is an American former Major League Baseball (MLB) outfielder who played for the Pittsburgh Pirates, Minnesota Twins, Houston Astros, Milwaukee Brewers, and Detroit Tigers from 2010 to 2017.

== Early and personal life ==
Presley was born on July 25, 1985, in Monroe, Louisiana. He graduated from Neville High School and attended the University of Mississippi. In 2005, he played collegiate summer baseball for the Chatham A's of the Cape Cod Baseball League and was named a league all-star.

== Professional career ==
=== Pittsburgh Pirates ===
Presley was selected by the Pittsburgh Pirates in the 8th round (230th overall) of the 2006 MLB draft. Presley started his professional career with the Williamsport Crosscutters in 2006. He played for the Hickory Crawdads in 2007. Presley spent the 2008 and 2009 seasons with the Lynchburg Hillcats.

Presley was promoted to the major leagues for the first time on September 8, 2010, and made his MLB debut the same day, getting his first major league hit off Atlanta Braves pitcher Cristhian Martínez.

He started the 2011 season with the Pirates' AAA team, the Indianapolis Indians. Presley was leading the Indians with a .336 batting average with eight home runs and 36 RBI when he was called up to MLB Pittsburgh on June 27, 2011. His .336 batting average was also the third-best in the International League at the time of his call up.

Presley hit his first home run on June 27, 2010, against Billy Buckner of the Toledo Mud Hens, and also posted the Indians first-ever cycle on the same day.

On April 7, 2012, Presley hit his first walk-off hit—an infield single off of Joe Blanton in the 10th inning, scoring Michael McKenry to give the Pirates a 2-1 win over the Phillies. Presley went 2-for-5 in the game.

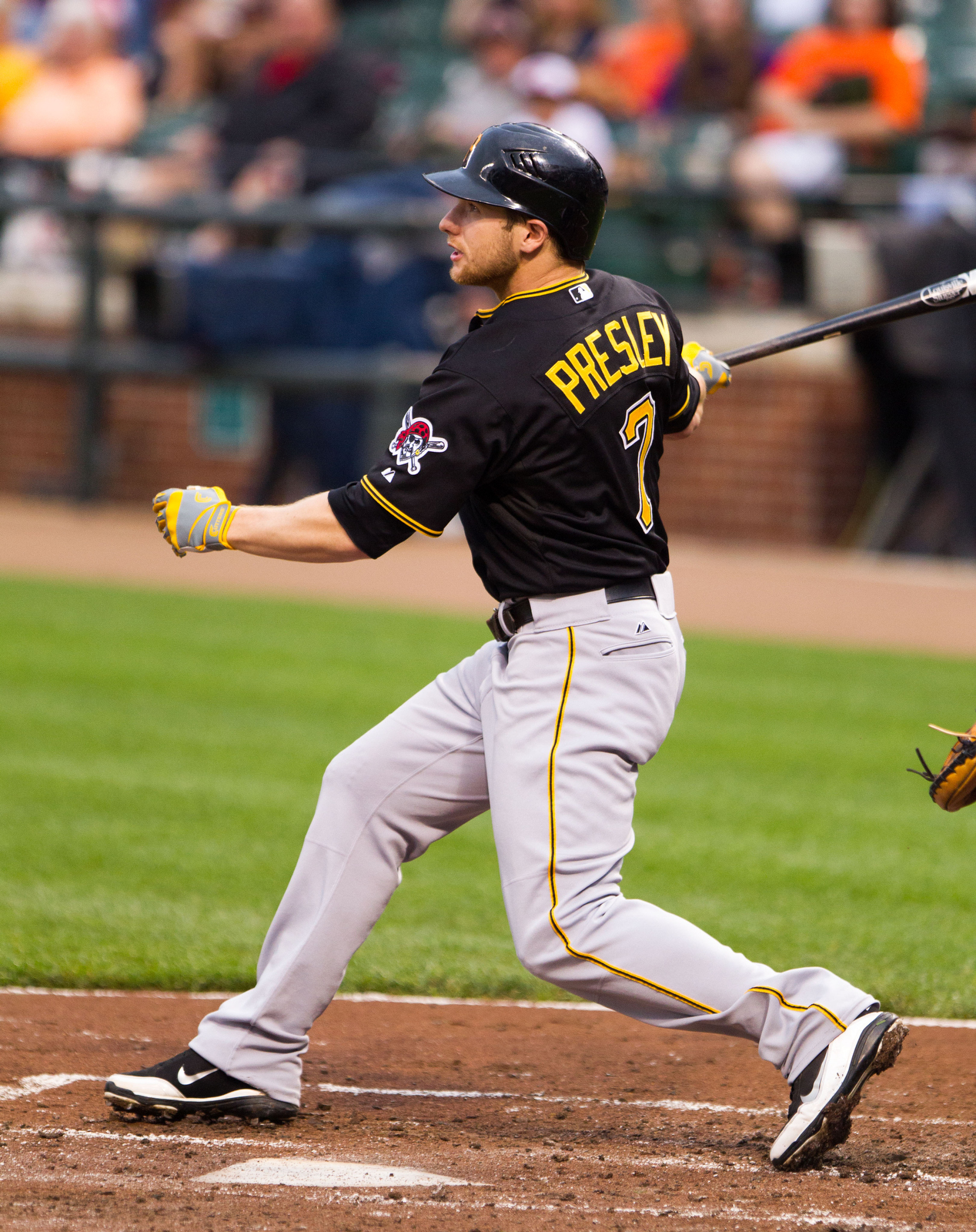
Presley in 2012

Presley was recalled by the Pirates from Indianapolis on May 31, 2013. He had a game-winning, walk-off single against the St. Louis Cardinals on July 30, 2013, giving the Pirates the division lead.

=== Minnesota Twins ===
On August 31, 2013, Presley was traded to the Minnesota Twins in exchange for Justin Morneau.

=== Houston Astros ===
On March 27, 2014, Presley was claimed off waivers by the Houston Astros. In 89 appearances for the Astros, Presley batted .244 to go along with 6 home runs and 19 RBIs. On November 18, 2014, the Astros resigned Presley on a 1-year contract. He was designated for assignment on April 1, 2015, but had his contract purchased on July 2, 2015. He was designated for assignment again on July 18.

=== Milwaukee Brewers ===
On December 14, 2015, Presley signed a minor league deal with the Milwaukee Brewers. Presley was one of nine players competing to be the Brewers center fielder for the 2016 season. On April 2, 2016, Presley was informed he would not make the Brewers Opening Day roster and was subsequently optioned to the minors. On April 21, 2016, Presley had his contract purchased by the Brewers. Presley was released after he rejected an outright assignment.

=== Detroit Tigers ===
On August 18, 2016, the Tigers purchased Presley's contract from the Triple-A Toledo Mud Hens. On December 19, 2016, Presley signed a minor league contract with the Tigers that included an invitation to spring training. On May 28, 2017, the Tigers again purchased Presley's contract from Toledo and added him to the starting lineup that day. Presley enjoyed a strong season with the 2017 Tigers, hitting .314 in 71 games while playing all three outfield positions. He was outrighted to Triple-A on November 2, 2017, and elected free agency on November 7.

=== Baltimore Orioles ===
On February 19, 2018, Presley signed a minor league contract with the Baltimore Orioles. In 26 games for the Triple–A Norfolk Tides, he batted .275/.347/.367 with one home run and eight RBI. On May 18, Presley was released by the Orioles organization.

=== Chicago White Sox ===
On May 23, 2018, Presley signed a minor league deal with the Chicago White Sox. He was assigned to the Triple–A Charlotte Knights. He was released by the White Sox on June 29, 2018
