= 2014 Pittsburgh Pirates season =

Major League Baseball season

2014 Pittsburgh Pirates
- National League Wild Card winners
- League: National League
- Division: Central
- Ballpark: PNC Park
- City: Pittsburgh, Pennsylvania
- Record: 88–74 (.543)
- Divisional place: 2nd
- Owners: Bob Nutting
- General managers: Neal Huntington
- Managers: Clint Hurdle
- Television: Root Sports Pittsburgh
- Radio: KDKA-FM; Pittsburgh Pirates Radio Network (Steve Blass, Greg Brown, Tim Neverett, Bob Walk, John Wehner)
- Stats: ESPN.com; Baseball Reference

The 2014 Pittsburgh Pirates season was the franchise's 128th season as a member of the National League, 133rd season overall, and 14th season at PNC Park. The regular season began with a win at home against the Chicago Cubs on March 31 and ended with a loss at Great American Ball Park against the Cincinnati Reds on September 28. The Pirates finished the regular season in second place for the second consecutive year in the National League Central with 88 wins and 74 losses.

The team clinched their second consecutive playoff berth with a victory on September 23. Also for the second consecutive season, however, the Pirates finished in second in their division behind the defending National League champion St. Louis Cardinals. The team secured one of two NL Wild Card spots, as well as home field advantage for the NLWC Game. However, they lost the October 1 playoff game to the San Francisco Giants, thus eliminating them from the 2014 postseason.

Three members of the 2014 Pirates were selected to represent the National League in the All-Star Game. In addition, two Pirates players were named NL Player of the Month: Andrew McCutchen in June and Josh Harrison in August. During the 2014 season, the franchise season attendance record (2,435,867, set during PNC Park's inaugural 2001 season) was broken on September 21, the final home game of the season and 23rd sellout of the year (tying the franchise sellout record set in 2013). The new record stood at 2,442,564 until being broken in the 2015 season.

== Season standings ==
=== National League Central ===
NL Central
Team	W	L	Pct.	GB	Home	Road
St. Louis Cardinals	90	72	.556	—	51‍–‍30	39‍–‍42
Pittsburgh Pirates	88	74	.543	2	51‍–‍30	37‍–‍44
Milwaukee Brewers	82	80	.506	8	42‍–‍39	40‍–‍41
Cincinnati Reds	76	86	.469	14	44‍–‍37	32‍–‍49
Chicago Cubs	73	89	.451	17	41‍–‍40	32‍–‍49

=== National League playoff standings ===
Division leaders
Team	W	L	Pct.
Washington Nationals	96	66	.593
Los Angeles Dodgers	94	68	.580
St. Louis Cardinals	90	72	.556

Wild Card teams (Top 2 teams qualify for postseason)
Team	W	L	Pct.	GB
Pittsburgh Pirates	88	74	.543	—
San Francisco Giants	88	74	.543	—
Milwaukee Brewers	82	80	.506	6
New York Mets	79	83	.488	9
Atlanta Braves	79	83	.488	9
Miami Marlins	77	85	.475	11
San Diego Padres	77	85	.475	11
Cincinnati Reds	76	86	.469	12
Philadelphia Phillies	73	89	.451	15
Chicago Cubs	73	89	.451	15
Colorado Rockies	66	96	.407	22
Arizona Diamondbacks	64	98	.395	24

=== Record vs. opponents ===
2014 National League record Source: MLB Standings Grid – 2014
Team	AZ	ATL	CHC	CIN	COL	LAD	MIA	MIL	NYM	PHI	PIT	SD	SF	STL	WSH	AL
Arizona	–	3–3	5–2	3–4	9–10	4–15	3–4	3–4	2–4	2–4	3–4	12–7	6–13	1–5	1–6	7–13
Atlanta	3–3	–	5–1	5–2	4–3	1–6	9–10	5–2	9–10	11–8	3–4	3–4	1–5	2–4	11–8	7–13
Chicago	2–5	1–5	–	8–11	5–2	3–4	4–2	11–8	5–2	3–3	5–14	3–4	2–4	9–10	3–4	9–11
Cincinnati	4–3	2–5	11–8	–	3–4	3–4	4–3	10–9	2–4	3–3	12–7	1–5	5–2	7–12	3–3	6–14
Colorado	10–9	3–4	2–5	4–3	–	6–13	3–4	1–6	3–4	3–3	2–4	10–9	10–9	1–5	1–5	7–13
Los Angeles	15–4	6–1	4–3	4–3	13–6	–	3–3	1–5	4–2	3–4	2–5	12–7	10–9	4–3	2–4	11–9
Miami	4–3	10–9	2–4	3–4	4–3	3–3	–	3–4	8–11	9–10	2–4	3–4	3–4	4–2	6–13	13–7
Milwaukee	4–3	2–5	8–11	9–10	6–1	5–1	4–3	–	4–3	3–4	12–7	3–3	2–4	7–12	2–4	11–9
New York	4–2	10–9	2–5	4–2	4–3	2–4	11–8	3–4	–	13–6	3–4	3–3	1–6	4–3	4–15	11–9
Philadelphia	4–2	8–11	3–3	3–3	3–3	4–3	10–9	4–3	6–13	–	1–6	4–3	2–5	4–3	10–9	7–13
Pittsburgh	4–3	4–3	14–5	7–12	4–2	5–2	4–2	7–12	4–3	6–1	–	3–3	4–2	8–11	3–4	11–9
San Diego	7–12	4–3	4–3	5–1	9–10	7–12	4–3	3–3	3–3	3–4	3–3	–	10–9	3–4	3–4	9–11
San Francisco	13–6	5–1	4–2	2–5	9–10	9–10	4–3	4–2	6–1	5–2	2–4	9–10	–	4–3	2–5	10–10
St. Louis	5–1	4–2	10–9	12–7	5–1	3–4	2–4	12–7	3–4	3–4	11–8	4–3	3–4	–	5–2	8–12
Washington	6–1	8–11	4–3	3–3	5–1	4–2	13–6	4–2	15–4	9–10	4–3	4–3	5–2	2–5	–	10–10

=== Detailed records ===
National League
Opponent	W	L	WP	RS	RA
NL East
Atlanta Braves	4	3	0.571	25	29
Miami Marlins	4	2	0.667	35	26
New York Mets	4	3	0.571	23	23
Philadelphia Phillies	6	1	0.857	36	18
Washington Nationals	3	4	0.429	24	26
Total	21	13	0.618	143	122
NL Central
Chicago Cubs	14	5	0.737	89	63
Cincinnati Reds	7	12	0.368	67	92
Milwaukee Brewers	7	12	0.368	81	66
Pittsburgh Pirates					
St. Louis Cardinals	8	11	0.421	69	62
Total	36	40	0.474	306	283
NL West
Arizona Diamondbacks	4	3	0.571	33	30
Colorado Rockies	4	2	0.667	21	28
Los Angeles Dodgers	5	2	0.714	35	32
San Diego Padres	3	3	0.500	21	18
San Francisco Giants	4	2	0.667	29	23
Total	20	12	0.625	139	131
American League
Baltimore Orioles	1	3	0.250	17	28
Boston Red Sox	3	0	1.000	16	3
Detroit Tigers	2	2	0.500	21	21
New York Yankees	1	2	0.333	9	14
Tampa Bay Rays	2	1	0.667	15	11
Toronto Blue Jays	2	1	0.667	16	18
Total	11	9	0.550	94	95
Season Total	88	74	0.543	682	631

Month	Games	Won	Lost	Win %	RS	RA
March	1	1	0	1.000	1	0
April	25	9	16	0.360	95	104
May	29	15	14	0.517	111	137
June	27	17	10	0.630	128	103
July	26	15	11	0.577	114	105
August	28	14	14	0.500	121	109
September	26	17	9	0.654	112	73
Total	162	88	74	0.543	682	631

	Games	Won	Lost	Win %	RS	RA
Home	81	51	30	0.630	350	299
Away	81	37	44	0.457	332	332
Total	162	88	74	0.543	682	631

== Regular season ==
=== Game log ===
2014 Game Log: 88–74 (Home: 51–30; Away: 37–44)
March: 1–0 (Home: 1–0; Away: 0–0)

#	Date	Opponent	Score	Win	Loss	Save	Attendance	Record
1	March 31	Cubs	1–0 (10)	**Morris** (1–0)	Villanueva (0–1)	—	39,833	1–0

April: 9–16 (Home: 5–8; Away: 4–8)

#	Date	Opponent	Score	Win	Loss	Save	Attendance	Record
2	April 2	Cubs	4–3 (16)	**Pimentel** (1–0)	Villanueva (0–2)	—	29,762	2–0
3	April 3	Cubs	2–3	Hammel (1–0)	**Rodríguez** (0–1)	Strop (1)	11,418	2–1
4	April 4	Cardinals	12–2	**Cole** (1–0)	Miller (0–1)	—	23,342	3–1
5	April 5	Cardinals	1–6	Kelly (1–0)	**Liriano** (0–1)	—	30,092	3–2
6	April 6	Cardinals	2–1	**Watson** (1–0)	Wainwright (1–1)	**Grilli** (1)	25,704	4–2
7	April 8	@ Cubs	7–6	**Watson** (2–0)	Strop (0–1)	**Grilli** (2)	26,177	5–2
8	April 9	@ Cubs	5–7	Hammel (2–0)	**Rodríguez** (0–2)	—	28,247	5–3
9	April 10	@ Cubs	5–4	**Cole** (2–0)	Russell (0–1)	**Grilli** (3)	25,502	6–3
10	April 11	@ Brewers	2–4	Peralta (1–0)	**Liriano** (0–2)	Rodríguez (3)	27,469	6–4
11	April 12	@ Brewers	2–3	Henderson (1–0)	**Melancon** (0–1)	Rodríguez (4)	42,828	6–5
12	April 13	@ Brewers	1–4	Lohse (2–1)	**Morton** (0–1)	Smith (1)	32,152	6–6
13	April 14	@ Reds	8–7	**Morris** (2–0)	LeCure (0–1)	**Grilli** (4)	17,756	7–6
14	April 15	@ Reds	5–7	Leake (2–1)	**Cole** (2–1)	Broxton (1)	18,462	7–7
15	April 16	@ Reds	0–4	Cueto (1–2)	**Liriano** (0–3)	—	16,825	7–8
16	April 17	Brewers	11–2	**Vólquez** (1–0)	Wooten (0–1)	—	17,584	8–8
17	April 18	Brewers	3–5	Lohse (3–1)	**Morton** (0–2)	Rodríguez (5)	31,564	8–9
18	April 19	Brewers	7–8	Henderson (2–0)	**Grilli** (0–1)	Rodríguez (6)	32,490	8–10
19	April 20	Brewers	2–3 (14)	Duke (1–0)	**Gómez** (0–1)	Rodríguez (7)	21,761	8–11
20	April 21	Reds	6–5	**Hughes** (1–0)	Hoover (1–2)	—	12,864	9–11
21	April 22	Reds	1–4	Cueto (2–2)	**Vólquez** (1–1)	—	11,926	9–12
22	April 23	Reds	2–5	Simón (3–1)	**Morton** (0–3)	Broxton (3)	16,705	9–13
23	April 24	Reds	1–2	Cingrani (2–2)	**Cumpton** (0–1)	Broxton (4)	18,896	9–14
24	April 25	@ Cardinals	0–1	Miller (2–2)	**Cole** (2–2)	Rosenthal (7)	43,193	9–15
25	April 26	@ Cardinals	6–1	**Pimentel** (2–0)	Lyons (0–2)	—	46,254	10–15
26	April 27	@ Cardinals	0–7	Wainwright (5–1)	**Vólquez** (1–2)	—	41,986	10–16
—	April 29	@ Orioles	PPD, RAIN; rescheduled for May 1					
—	April 30	@ Orioles	PPD, RAIN; rescheduled for May 1					

May: 15–14 (Home: 10–5; Away: 5–9)

#	Date	Opponent	Score	Win	Loss	Save	Attendance	Record
27	May 1	@ Orioles	1–5	Norris (2–2)	**Morton** (0–4)	Hunter (7)	—	10–17
28	May 1	@ Orioles	5–6 (10)	Hunter (1–0)	**Pimentel** (2–1)	—	28,290	10–18
29	May 2	Blue Jays	6–5	**Melancon** (1–1)	Santos (0–2)	—	24,547	11–18
30	May 3	Blue Jays	8–6	**Morris** (3–0)	Redmond (0–3)	**Melancon** (1)	31,439	12–18
31	May 4	Blue Jays	2–7	McGowan (2–1)	**Vólquez** (1–3)	—	29,496	12–19
32	May 5	Giants	10–11 (13)	Machi (5–0)	**Hughes** (1–1)	Romo (10)	13,675	12–20
33	May 6	Giants	2–1	**Watson** (3–0)	Hudson (4–2)	—	18,881	13–20
34	May 7	Giants	4–3	**Cole** (3–2)	Lincecum (2–2)	**Melancon** (2)	23,975	14–20
35	May 9	Cardinals	6–4	**Wilson** (1–0)	Martínez (0–2)	**Melancon** (3)	33,696	15–20
36	May 10	Cardinals	4–3	**Hughes** (2–1)	Lynn (4–2)	**Melancon** (4)	34,914	16–20
37	May 11	Cardinals	5–6	Miller (5–2)	**Morton** (0–5)	Rosenthal (10)	32,065	16–21
38	May 13	@ Brewers	2–5	Estrada (3–1)	**Cole** (3–3)	Rodríguez (16)	24,176	16–22
39	May 14	@ Brewers	4–1	**Watson** (4–0)	Rodríguez (1–1)	**Melancon** (5)	24,962	17–22
40	May 15	@ Brewers	3–4	Wooten (1–1)	**Melancon** (1–2)	—	34,743	17–23
—	May 16	@ Yankees	PPD, RAIN; rescheduled for May 18					
41	May 17	@ Yankees	1–7	Phelps (1–0)	**Vólquez** (1–4)	—	47,353	17–24
42	May 18	@ Yankees	3–4	Kuroda (3–3)	**Morton** (0–6)	Robertson (8)	—	17–25
43	May 18	@ Yankees	5–3	**Cole** (4–3)	Aceves (0–2)	**Melancon** (6)	46,858	18–25
44	May 20	Orioles	2–9	González (2–3)	**Liriano** (0–4)	—	22,787	18–26
45	May 21	Orioles	9–8	**Morris** (4–0)	Webb (2–1)	**Melancon** (7)	19,365	19–26
46	May 22	Nationals	3–1	**Vólquez** (2–4)	Treinen (0–2)	**Melancon** (8)	23,468	20–26
47	May 23	Nationals	4–3	**Morton** (1–6)	Zimmerman (3–2)	**Grilli** (5)	31,592	21–26
48	May 24	Nationals	3–2	**Hughes** (3–1)	Strasburg (3–4)	**Melancon** (9)	38,889	22–26
49	May 25	Nationals	2–5	Fister (2–1)	**Liriano** (0–5)	Soriano (11)	38,047	22–27
50	May 26	@ Mets	5–3	**Watson** (5–0)	Valverde (1–1)	**Melancon** (10)	29,309	23–27
51	May 27	@ Mets	2–4	Black (1–0)	**Gómez** (0–2)	Mejía (4)	20,263	23–28
52	May 28	@ Mets	0–5	Colón (4–5)	**Morton** (1–7)	Familia (1)	34,839	23–29
53	May 29	@ Dodgers	6–3	**Cole** (5–3)	League (1–2)	**Grilli** (6)	39,643	24–29
54	May 30	@ Dodgers	2–1	**Liriano** (1–5)	Beckett (3–2)	**Grilli** (7)	47,503	25–29
55	May 31	@ Dodgers	2–12	Ryu (6–2)	**Cumpton** (0–2)	Wright (1)	49,455	25–30

June: 17–10 (Home: 8–6; Away: 9–4)

#	Date	Opponent	Score	Win	Loss	Save	Attendance	Record
56	June 1	@ Dodgers	5–3	**Vólquez** (3–4)	Greinke (8–2)	**Grilli** (8)	51,020	26–30
57	June 2	@ Padres	10–3	**Morton** (2–7)	Stauffer (2–2)	—	18,876	27–30
58	June 3	@ Padres	4–1	**Cole** (6–3)	Hahn (0–1)	**Grilli** (9)	20,520	28–30
59	June 4	@ Padres	2–3	Kennedy (5–6)	**Liriano** (1–6)	Street (18)	17,923	28–31
60	June 6	Brewers	15–5	**Cumpton** (1–2)	Lohse (7–2)	—	35,544	29–31
61	June 7	Brewers	3–9	Garza (4–4)	**Vólquez** (3–5)	—	38,525	29–32
62	June 8	Brewers	0–1	Gallardo (4–4)	**Locke** (0–1)	Rodríguez (19)	35,002	29–33
63	June 9	Cubs	6–2	**Morton** (3–7)	Jackson (4–6)	—	24,075	30–33
64	June 10	Cubs	3–7	Wood (6–5)	**Sadler** (0–1)	—	31,567	30–34
65	June 11	Cubs	4–2	**Cumpton** (2–2)	Hammel (6–4)	**Grilli** (10)	20,540	31–34
66	June 12	Cubs	4–0	**Vólquez** (4–5)	Samardzija (2–6)	—	25,431	32–34
67	June 13	@ Marlins	8–6 (13)	**Gómez** (1–2)	Dunn (5–4)	—	19,054	33–34
68	June 14	@ Marlins	8–6	**Morton** (4–7)	Wolf (1–3)	**Grilli** (11)	21,195	34–34
69	June 15	@ Marlins	2–3 (10)	Ramos (4–0)	**Hughes** (3–2)	—	25,953	34–35
70	June 17	Reds	5–6	Ondrusek (2–2)	**Grilli** (0–2)	Chapman (12)	23,565	34–36
71	June 18	Reds	4–11	Simón (10–3)	**Vólquez** (4–6)	—	23,329	34–37
72	June 19	Reds	4–3 (12)	**Wilson** (2–0)	Cingrani (2–8)	—	30,710	35–37
73	June 20	@ Cubs	3–6	Jackson (5–7)	**Morton** (4–8)	Rondón (8)	36,423	35–38
74	June 21	@ Cubs	5–3	**Worley** (1–0)	Wood (7–6)	**Melancon** (11)	36,563	36–38
75	June 22	@ Cubs	2–1	**Cumpton** (3–2)	Hammel (6–5)	**Melancon** (12)	33,573	37–38
76	June 23	@ Rays	8–1	**Vólquez** (5–6)	Cobb (2–6)	—	13,175	38–38
77	June 24	@ Rays	6–5	**Locke** (1–1)	Archer (4–5)	**Melancon** (13)	14,684	39–38
78	June 25	@ Rays	1–5	Price (6–7)	**Morton** (4–9)	—	23,761	39–39
79	June 26	Mets	5–2	**Worley** (2–0)	Matsuzaka (3–2)	**Melancon** (14)	36,647	40–39
80	June 27	Mets	3–2 (11)	**Hughes** (4–2)	Black (1–2)	—	37,952	41–39
81	June 28	Mets	3–5	Niese (5–4)	**Cole** (6–4)	Mejía (8)	38,930	41–40
82	June 29	Mets	5–2	**Vólquez** (6–6)	Colón (8–6)	**Melancon** (15)	37,290	42–40

July: 15–11 (Home: 10–2; Away: 5–9)

#	Date	Opponent	Score	Win	Loss	Save	Attendance	Record
83	July 1	Diamondbacks	3–2	**Frieri** (1–3)	Reed (1–4)	—	21,426	43–40
84	July 2	Diamondbacks	5–1	**Morton** (5–9)	Anderson (5–4)	—	24,161	44–40
85	July 3	Diamondbacks	2–10	McCarthy (3–10)	**Worley** (2–1)	—	27,473	44–41
86	July 4	Phillies	8–2	**Cole** (7–4)	Hernández (3–8)	—	38,977	45–41
87	July 5	Phillies	3–2	**Vólquez** (7–6)	Buchanan (4–5)	**Melancon** (16)	37,821	46–41
88	July 6	Phillies	6–2	**Locke** (2–1)	Burnett (5–8)	—	33,408	47–41
89	July 7	@ Cardinals	0–2	Neshek (3–0)	**Wilson** (2–1)	—	42,448	47–42
90	July 8	@ Cardinals	4–5	Rosenthal (1–4)	**Frieri** (1–4)	—	43,162	47–43
91	July 9	@ Cardinals	2–5	Lynn (10–6)	**Cumpton** (3–3)	Rosenthal (27)	43,941	47–44
92	July 10	@ Cardinals	9–1	**Vólquez** (8–6)	Miller (7–8)	—	43,974	48–44
93	July 11	@ Reds	5–6	Partch (1–0)	**Watson** (5–1)	Chapman (20)	36,613	48–45
94	July 12	@ Reds	6–5 (11)	**Wilson** (3–1)	Hoover (1–7)	**Gómez** (1)	42,789	49–45
95	July 13	@ Reds	3–6	Cueto (10–6)	**Liriano** (1–7)	Chapman (21)	35,022	49–46
–	July 15	85th All-Star Game	National League vs. American League (Target Field, Minneapolis)					
96	July 18	Rockies	4–2	**Watson** (6–1)	Belisle (2–5)	**Melancon** (17)	37,833	50–46
97	July 19	Rockies	3–2 (11)	**Hughes** (5–2)	Bettis (0–2)	—	37,396	51–46
98	July 20	Rockies	5–3	**Gómez** (2–2)	Belisle (2–6)	**Melancon** (18)	35,609	52–46
99	July 21	Dodgers	2–5	Ryu (11–5)	**Vólquez** (8–7)	Jansen (29)	28,255	52–47
100	July 22	Dodgers	12–7	**Worley** (3–1)	Maholm (1–5)	—	30,629	53–47
101	July 23	Dodgers	6–1	**Liriano** (2–7)	Haren (8–8)	—	30,785	54–47
102	July 25	@ Rockies	1–8	Anderson (1–3)	**Morton** (5–10)	—	38,487	54–48
103	July 26	@ Rockies	1–8	Matzek (2–4)	**Locke** (2–2)	—	44,611	54–49
104	July 27	@ Rockies	7–5	**Watson** (7–1)	Brothers (3–5)	**Melancon** (19)	40,382	55–49
105	July 28	@ Giants	5–0	**Worley** (4–1)	Bumgarner (12–8)	—	41,794	56–49
106	July 29	@ Giants	3–1	**Liriano** (3–7)	Hudson (8–8)	**Melancon** (20)	42,242	57–49
107	July 30	@ Giants	5–7	Machi (6–0)	**Wilson** (3–2)	Casilla (8)	42,272	57–50
108	July 31	@ Diamondbacks	4–7	Pérez (2–1)	**Locke** (2–3)	Reed (27)	20,145	57–51

August: 14–14 (Home: 10–7; Away: 4–7)

#	Date	Opponent	Score	Win	Loss	Save	Attendance	Record
109	August 1	@ Diamondbacks	9–4	**Watson** (8–1)	Schultz (0–1)	—	22,766	58–51
110	August 2	@ Diamondbacks	8–3	**Hughes** (6–2)	Ziegler (4–2)	—	33,151	59–51
111	August 3	@ Diamondbacks	2–3 (10)	Marshall (4–2)	**Melancon** (1–3)	—	26,913	59–52
112	August 5	Marlins	3–6	Ramos (5–0)	**Hughes** (6–3)	—	26,734	59–53
113	August 6	Marlins	7–3	**Locke** (3–3)	Koehler (7–9)	—	26,976	60–53
114	August 7	Marlins	7–2	**Vólquez** (9–7)	Flynn (0–1)	—	29,035	61–53
115	August 8	Padres	2–1	**Worley** (5–1)	Kennedy (8–10)	**Melancon** (21)	38,088	62–53
116	August 9	Padres	1–2	Stults (5–13)	**Liriano** (3–8)	Benoit (5)	38,614	62–54
117	August 10	Padres	2–8	Ross (11–10)	**Morton** (5–11)	—	38,030	62–55
118	August 11	Tigers	11–6	**Locke** (4–3)	Verlander (10–11)	—	35,314	63–55
119	August 12	Tigers	4–2	**Vólquez** (10–7)	Ray (1–2)	**Melancon** (22)	34,919	64–55
120	August 13	@ Tigers	4–8	Hardy (2–1)	**Worley** (5–2)	—	41,043	64–56
121	August 14	@ Tigers	2–5	Scherzer (14–4)	**Liriano** (3–9)	—	41,986	64–57
122	August 15	@ Nationals	4–5	Roark (12–7)	**Morton** (5–12)	Soriano (29)	36,945	64–58
123	August 16	@ Nationals	3–4	Thornton (1–0)	**Wilson** (3–3)	—	41,880	64–59
124	August 17	@ Nationals	5–6 (11)	Detwiler (2–2)	**Cumpton** (3–4)	—	34,430	64–60
125	August 18	Braves	3–7	Santana (13–6)	**Worley** (5–3)	—	31,669	64–61
126	August 19	Braves	3–11	Harang (10–7)	**Liriano** (3–10)	—	27,033	64–62
127	August 20	Braves	3–2	**Melancon** (2–3)	Carpenter (4–3)	—	26,581	65–62
128	August 22	@ Brewers	8–3	**Locke** (5–3)	Gallardo (8–7)	—	37,437	66–62
129	August 23	@ Brewers	10–2	**Vólquez** (11–7)	Peralta (15–8)	—	40,557	67–62
130	August 24	@ Brewers	3–4	Fiers (4–1)	**Worley** (5–4)	Rodríguez (39)	42,761	67–63
131	August 25	Cardinals	2–3	Lackey (13–8)	**Hughes** (6–4)	Rosenthal (39)	24,352	67–64
132	August 26	Cardinals	5–2	**Watson** (9–1)	Maness (5–3)	**Melancon** (23)	25,521	68–64
133	August 27	Cardinals	3–1	**Locke** (6–3)	Wainwright (15–9)	**Melancon** (24)	29,905	69–64
134	August 29	Reds	2–1	**Watson** (10–1)	Broxton (4–2)	**Melancon** (25)	37,209	70–64
135	August 30	Reds	3–2	**Worley** (6–4)	Simón (13–9)	**Melancon** (26)	38,023	71–64
136	August 31	Reds	2–3	Cueto (16–8)	**Hughes** (6–5)	Chapman (29)	37,591	71–65

September: 17–9 (Home: 7–2; Away: 10–7)

#	Date	Opponent	Score	Win	Loss	Save	Attendance	Record
137	September 1	@ Cardinals	4–5	Maness (6–3)	**Cole** (7–5)	Rosenthal (41)	43,347	71–66
138	September 2	@ Cardinals	4–6	Wainwright (16–9)	**Locke** (6–4)	Neshek (5)	43,693	71–67
139	September 3	@ Cardinals	0-1	Rosenthal (2–6)	**Melancon** (2–4)	—	42,864	71–68
140	September 5	@ Cubs	5–3 (11)	**Melancon** (3–4)	Wright (0–3)	**Holdzkom** (1)	35,541	72–68
141	September 6	@ Cubs	5–0	**Liriano** (4–10)	Doubront (3–5)	—	36,867	73–68
142	September 7	@ Cubs	10–4	**Cole** (8–5)	Wood (8–12)	—	33,894	74–68
143	September 8	@ Phillies	6–4	**Locke** (7–4)	Kendrick (8–12)	**Melancon** (27)	23,140	75–68
144	September 9	@ Phillies	3–4	De Fratus (3–1)	**Wilson** (3–4)	Papelbon (36)	26,900	75–69
145	September 10	@ Phillies	6–3	**Worley** (7–4)	Williams (5–6)	**Melancon** (28)	25,315	76–69
146	September 11	@ Phillies	4–1	**Liriano** (5–10)	Burnett (8–16)	**Melancon** (29)	26,535	77–69
147	September 12	Cubs	7–3	**Cole** (9–5)	Wada (4–3)	—	35,638	78–69
148	September 13	Cubs	4–6	Doubront (4–5)	**Locke** (7–5)	Rondón (24)	38,024	78–70
149	September 14	Cubs	7–3	**Vólquez** (12–7)	Turner (5–10)	—	37,655	79–70
150	September 16	Red Sox	4–0	**Morton** (6–12)	Ranaudo (3–3)	—	34,698	80–70
151	September 17	Red Sox	9–1	**Liriano** (6–10)	Buchholz (8–9)	—	34,785	81–70
152	September 18	Red Sox	3–2	**Cole** (10–5)	Workman (1–10)	**Melancon** (30)	36,862	82–70
153	September 19	Brewers	4–2	**Holdzkom** (1–0)	Broxton (4–3)	**Melancon** (31)	37,974	83–70
154	September 20	Brewers	0–1	Duke (5–1)	**Melancon** (3–5)	Rodríguez (43)	39,027	83–71
155	September 21	Brewers	1–0	**Worley** (8–4)	Peralta (16–11)	**Watson** (1)	38,650	84–71
156	September 22	@ Braves	1–0	**Liriano** (7–10)	Harang (11–12)	**Melancon** (32)	20,252	85–71
157	September 23	@ Braves	3–2	**Cole** (11–5)	Wood (11–11)	**Watson** (2)	23,029	86–71
158	September 24	@ Braves	2–6	Teherán (14–13)	**Locke** (7–6)	Kimbrel (45)	25,457	86–72
159	September 25	@ Braves	10–1	**Vólquez** (13–7)	Hale (4–5)	—	35,140	87–72
160	September 26	@ Reds	3–1	**Hughes** (7–5)	Villarreal (0–2)	**Melancon** (33)	35,611	88–72
161	September 27	@ Reds	6–10 (10)	Axelrod (2–1)	**Axford** (2–4)	—	35,268	88–73
162	September 28	@ Reds	1–4	Cueto (20–9)	**Watson** (10–2)	Chapman (36)	34,424	88–74

Legend: = Win = Loss = Postponement
Bold = Pirates team member

== Postseason ==
=== Wild Card Game ===
- **October 1 – National League Wild Card game –** The Pirates lost to the San Francisco Giants in the Wild Card Game.

Team	1	2	3	4	5	6	7	8	9	R	H	E
San Francisco Giants	0	0	0	4	0	1	2	1	0	**8**	**11**	**2**
Pittsburgh Pirates	0	0	0	0	0	0	0	0	0	**0**	**4**	**0**
WP: Madison Bumgarner (1–0) LP: Edinson Vólquez (0–1); Home runs: SF: Brandon Crawford (1); PIT: None

=== Game log ===
2014 Postseason Game Log (0–1)
2014 NL Wild Card Game: vs. San Francisco Giants (0–1)

#	Date	Opponent	Score	Win	Loss	Save	Attendance	Series
1	October 1	Giants	0–8	Bumgarner (1–0)	**Vólquez** (0–1)	—	40,629	0–1

Legend: = Win = Loss = Postponement
Bold = Pirates team member

== Roster ==
2014 Pittsburgh Pirates
**Roster**
**Pitchers**: 53 John Axford; 45 Gerrit Cole; 58 Brandon Cumpton; 29 Ernesto Frieri; 30 Jeanmar Gómez; 39 Jason Grilli; 43 John Holdzkom; 48 Jared Hughes; 60 Bobby LaFromboise; 47 Francisco Liriano; 49 Jeff Locke; 32 Vin Mazzaro; 35 Mark Melancon; 29 Bryan Morris; 50 Charlie Morton; 38 Stolmy Pimentel; 51 Wandy Rodríguez; 65 Casey Sadler; 36 Edinson Vólquez; 44 Tony Watson; 37 Justin Wilson; 46 Vance Worley	**Catchers**: 55 Russell Martin; 26 Tony Sanchez; 19 Chris Stewart; **Infielders**: 24 Pedro Alvarez; 12 Clint Barmes; 39 Chase d'Arnaud; 15 Ike Davis; 51 Matt Hague; 5 Josh Harrison; 3 Travis Ishikawa; 10 Jordy Mercer; 59 Brent Morel; 27 Jayson Nix; 17 Gaby Sánchez; 18 Neil Walker	**Outfielders**: 14 Jaff Decker; 57 Andrew Lambo; 6 Starling Marté; 3 Michael Martínez; 22 Andrew McCutchen; 25 Gregory Polanco; 23 Travis Snider; 31 José Tábata	**Manager**: 13 Clint Hurdle; **Coaches**: 86 Heberto Andrade (bullpen catcher); 28 Jeff Banister (bench); 2 Jeff Branson (hitting); 85 Dave Jauss (coach); 7 Frank Kremblas (special assistant); 16 Nick Leyva (third base); 75 Jeff Livesey (coach); 56 Euclides Rojas (bullpen); 54 Ray Searage (pitching); 41 Rick Sofield (first base)

=== Opening Day lineup ===
Opening Day lineup

Opening Day Starters
Name	Position
Starling Marte	LF
Travis Snider	RF
Andrew McCutchen	CF
Pedro Álvarez	3B
Russell Martin	C
Neil Walker	2B
Travis Ishikawa	1B
Jordy Mercer	SS
Francisco Liriano	SP

=== Disabled lists ===
7-day disabled list

Player	Injury	Placed	Activated
Starling Marte	Concussion	July 13, 2014	July 23, 2014

15-day disabled list

Player	Injury	Placed	Activated
Jeff Locke	—	—	April 10, 2014
Chris Stewart	—	—	April 19, 2014
Wandy Rodríguez	Right knee inflammation	April 21, 2014	May 15, 2014
Jason Grilli	Strained left oblique	April 25, 2014	May 23, 2014
Russell Martin	Strained left hamstring	April 26, 2014	May 22, 2014
Stolmy Pimentel	Right shoulder inflammation	May 3, 2014	June 11, 2014
Gerrit Cole	Right shoulder fatigue	June 8, 2014	June 28, 2014
Neil Walker	Appendectomy	June 9, 2014	June 24, 2014
Francisco Liriano	Strained oblique muscle	June 11, 2014	July 13, 2014
Clint Barmes	Left groin strain	July 6, 2014	August 25, 2014
Gerrit Cole	Right lat soreness	July 9, 2014	August 20, 2014
Andrew McCutchen	Fractured rib	August 4, 2014	August 19, 2014
Stolmy Pimentel	Sprained right ankle	August 15, 2014	September 1, 2014
Charlie Morton	Right hip inflammation	August 17, 2014	September 16, 2014

60-day disabled list

Player	Injury	Placed	Activated
Charlie Morton	Hip surgery	September 24, 2014	October 25, 2014

=== Suspensions/fines ===
Suspensions and fines

Player	Length	Date issued	Date served	Date reinstated
Russell Martin	1 game	April 22, 2014	May 22, 2014	May 23, 2014
Travis Snider	2 games	April 22, 2014	May 9, 2014	May 11, 2014

=== Transactions ===
The Pirates were involved in the following transactions during the 2014 season:

- **Black line marks the transition between off season and regular season**

Trades

November 18, 2013	To Minnesota Twins: Kris Johnson	To Pittsburgh Pirates: Duke Welker
November 25, 2013	To San Diego Padres: Alex Dickerson	To Pittsburgh Pirates: Jaff Decker; Miles Mikolas
December 2, 2013	To New York Yankees: PTBNL (Kyle Haynes)	To Pittsburgh Pirates: Chris Stewart
December 30, 2013	To Texas Rangers: Miles Mikolas	To Pittsburgh Pirates: Chris McGuiness
March 25, 2014	To Minnesota Twins: Cash considerations	To Pittsburgh Pirates: Vance Worley
March 27, 2014	To Arizona Diamondbacks: Cash considerations	To Pittsburgh Pirates: Keon Broxton
April 18, 2014	To New York Mets: Zack Thornton; PTBNL (Blake Taylor)	To Pittsburgh Pirates: Ike Davis
June 1, 2014	To Miami Marlins: Bryan Morris	To Pittsburgh Pirates: 2014 competitive balance round A pick (#39–Connor Joe)
June 27, 2014	To Los Angeles Angels of Anaheim: Jason Grilli	To Pittsburgh Pirates: Ernesto Frieri
July 7, 2014	To Cleveland Indians: Chris Dickerson	To Pittsburgh Pirates: PTBNL or cash
October 25, 2014	To Cleveland Indians: Cash Considerations	To Pittsburgh Pirates: Justin Sellers

Free agents

Player	Acquired from	Lost to	Date	Contract terms
Marlon Byrd		Philadelphia Phillies	November 12, 2013	2 year/$16 million
Collin Balester	Texas Rangers		November 20, 2013	Minor league contract
Jake Brigham	Texas Rangers		November 20, 2013	Minor league contract^{[a]}
Jay Jackson	Miami Marlins		November 20, 2013	Minor league contract^{[a]}
Josh Kinney	Seattle Mariners		November 20, 2013	Minor league contract^{[a]}
Seth McClung	Chicago Cubs		November 20, 2013	Minor league contract
Nevin Ashley	Cincinnati Reds		November 26, 2013	Minor league contract^{[a]}
Erik Cordier		San Francisco Giants	November 27, 2013	1 year
Russ Canzler		New York Yankees	December 2, 2013	Minor league contract
Brian Bocock		Kansas City Royals	December 5, 2013	Minor league contract
Garrett Jones		Miami Marlins	December 9, 2013	2 year/$7.75 million
Edinson Vólquez	Los Angeles Dodgers		December 11, 2013	1 year/$5 million
Doug Mathis		Texas Rangers	December 12, 2013	Minor league contract
Michael Martínez	Philadelphia Phillies		December 13, 2013	Minor league contract^{[a]}
Justin Morneau		Colorado Rockies	December 13, 2013	2 year/$12.5 million
Jared Goedert		Toronto Blue Jays	December 16, 2013	Minor league contract^{[a]}
Daniel Schlereth	Baltimore Orioles		December 18, 2013	Minor league contract^{[a]}
Elvin Ramírez	Los Angeles Angels of Anaheim		December 18, 2013	Minor league contract
Travis Ishikawa	Chicago White Sox		December 18, 2013	Minor league contract^{[a]}
Brandon Mann	Washington Nationals		December 18, 2013	Minor league contract
Iván DeJesús, Jr.		Baltimore Orioles	December 19, 2013	Minor league contract
Chris Dickerson	Baltimore Orioles		January 6, 2014	Minor league contract^{[a]}
Alí Solís		Tampa Bay Rays	January 6, 2014	Minor league contract
Atahualpa Severino		Atlanta Braves	January 8, 2014	Minor league contract
John Buck		Seattle Mariners	January 14, 2014	1 year/$1 million
Michael McKenry		Colorado Rockies	January 16, 2014	1 year/$750,000
Lucas May		Milwaukee Brewers	January 30, 2014	Minor league contract
Kyle Farnsworth		New York Mets	February 3, 2014	Minor league contract^{[a]}
Omir Santos	Cleveland Indians		February 7, 2014	Minor league contract^{[a]}
A. J. Burnett		Philadelphia Phillies	February 12, 2014	1 year/$16 million
Brett Carroll		Toronto Blue Jays	February 18, 2014	Minor league contract
Travis Ishikawa		San Francisco Giants	April 25, 2014	Minor league contract
Matt Nevarez	Tampa Bay Rays		August 24, 2014	Minor league contract

Waivers

Player	Claimed from	Lost to	Date
Jerry Sands		Tampa Bay Rays	December 23, 2013
Ryan Reid		New York Mets	December 23, 2013
Brent Morel	Toronto Blue Jays		February 24, 2014
Josh Wall	Los Angeles Angels of Anaheim		May 22, 2014
Phil Irwin		Texas Rangers	May 28, 2014
Wirfin Obispo	Atlanta Braves		June 1, 2014
Dean Anna	Cleveland Indians		July 5, 2014
Ángel Sánchez	Chicago White Sox		July 31, 2014
Tommy Field	Los Angeles Angels of Anaheim		August 10, 2014
John Axford	Cleveland Indians		August 14, 2014
Matt Hague		Toronto Blue Jays	August 18, 2014
Bobby LaFromboise	San Diego Padres		August 24, 2014
Jayson Nix		Kansas City Royals	August 28, 2014

Signings

Player	Date	Contract terms
Anthony Norman	November 6, 2013	Minor league contract
Cody Eppley	November 26, 2013	Minor league contract^{[a]}
Chris Stewart	December 2, 2013	1 year
Ralph Henriquez	December 5, 2013	Minor league contract
Charlie Morton	December 11, 2013	3 year/$21 million
Clint Barmes	December 12, 2013	1 year/$2 million
Adam Wilk	December 18, 2013	Minor league contract^{[a]}
Kyle McPherson	December 18, 2013	Minor league contract^{[a]}
Robert Andino	January 6, 2014	Minor league contract^{[a]}
Gaby Sánchez	January 16, 2014	1 year/$2.3 million
Mark Melancon	January 16, 2014	1 year/$2.595 million
Neil Walker	January 16, 2014	1 year/$5.75 million
Pedro Álvarez	January 16, 2014	1 year/$4.25 million
Travis Snider	January 16, 2014	1-year extension/$1.2 million
Vin Mazzaro	January 16, 2014	1 year/$950,000
Yao-Hsun Yang	February 13, 2014	Minor league contract^{[a]}
Starling Marte	March 26, 2014	6 year/$31 million
Nathan Tomaszewski	May 13, 2014	Minor league contract
Alex McRae	June 11, 2014	Minor league contract (2014 10th round draft pick)
Eric Dorsch	June 11, 2014	Minor league contract (2014 15th round draft pick)
Michael Suchy	June 11, 2014	Minor league contract (2014 5th round draft pick)
Tyler Eppler	June 11, 2014	Minor league contract (2014 6th round draft pick)
Tyler Fillben	June 11, 2014	Minor league contract (2014 12th round draft pick)
Taylor Gushue	June 12, 2014	Minor league contract (2014 4th round draft pick)
Austin Coley	June 12, 2014	Minor league contract (2014 8th round draft pick)
Sam Street	June 12, 2014	Minor league contract (2014 16th round draft pick)
Erik Lunde	June 12, 2014	Minor league contract (2014 18th round draft pick)
Carl Anderson	June 12, 2014	Minor league contract (2014 19th round draft pick)
Nick Neumann	June 12, 2014	Minor league contract (2014 28th round draft pick)
Montana DuRapau	June 12, 2014	Minor league contract (2014 32nd round draft pick)
Cole Tucker	June 12, 2014	Minor league contract (2014 1st round draft pick)
Luis Paula	June 12, 2014	Minor league contract (2014 31st round draft pick)
Jess Amedee	June 12, 2014	Minor league contract (2014 27th round draft pick)
John Sever	June 12, 2014	Minor league contract (2014 20th round draft pick)
Mitch Keller	June 14, 2014	Minor league contract (2014 2nd round draft pick)
Trey Supak	June 14, 2014	Minor league contract (2014 Comp. B draft pick)
Nelson Jorge	June 14, 2014	Minor league contract (2014 7th round draft pick)
Frank Duncan	June 14, 2014	Minor league contract (2014 13th round draft pick)
Chase Simpson	June 14, 2014	Minor league contract (2014 14th round draft pick)
Michael Clemens	June 14, 2014	Minor league contract (2014 17th round draft pick)
Eric Thomas	June 14, 2014	Minor league contract (2014 21st round draft pick)
Eric Karch	June 14, 2014	Minor league contract (2014 22nd round draft pick)
Palmer Betts	June 14, 2014	Minor league contract (2014 36th round draft pick)
Connor Joe	June 17, 2014	Minor league contract (2014 Comp. A draft pick)
Jordan Luplow	June 17, 2014	Minor league contract (2014 3rd round draft pick)
Kevin Krause	June 17, 2014	Minor league contract (2014 9th round draft pick)
Erik Forgione	June 17, 2014	Minor league contract (2014 25th round draft pick)
David Andreise	June 17, 2014	Minor league contract (2014 30th round draft pick)
John Holdzkom	June 24, 2014	Minor league contract
Jerrick Suiter	June 26, 2014	Minor league contract (2014 26th round draft pick)
Chris Harvey	July 1, 2014	Minor league contract
Gage Hinsz	July 9, 2014	Minor league contract (2014 11th round draft pick)
Rafael Pérez	July 12, 2014	Minor league contract

Other

Name	Date	Details
Jeff Branson	November 18, 2013	Hired as hitting coach
Jeff Livesey	November 18, 2013	Hired as coach
Evan Chambers	December 1, 2013	Died
Charles Cutler	December 12, 2013	Lost in Rule 5 AAA draft (to Chicago Cubs)
Roberto Espinosa	December 12, 2013	Lost in Rule 5 AAA draft (to Toronto Blue Jays)
Wei-Chung Wang	December 12, 2013	Lost in Rule 5 major league draft (to Milwaukee Brewers)
A. J. Morris	December 12, 2013	Claimed in Rule 5 AAA draft (from Chicago Cubs)
Felipe Gonzalez	December 12, 2013	Claimed in Rule 5 AAA draft (from New York Yankees)
Tyler Sample	December 12, 2013	Claimed in Rule 5 AAA draft (from Kansas City Royals)
Brian Esposito	January 13, 2014	Hired as minor league manager
Carlo Alvarez	January 13, 2014	Hired as sport performance coordinator
Dave Turgeon	January 13, 2014	Hired as assistant minor league field coordinator
Edgar Varela	January 13, 2014	Hired as minor league manager
Frank Kremblas	January 13, 2014	Hired as special assistant to player development
Hector Morales	January 13, 2014	Hired as assistant coordinator of mental conditioning
Larry Sutton	January 13, 2014	Hired as minor league hitting coordinator
Tom Prince	January 13, 2014	Hired as minor league manager
Seth McClung	March 19, 2014	Released
Clint Hurdle	April 5, 2014	Resigned as manager to a 3-year contract extension
Neal Huntington	April 5, 2014	Resigned as GM to a 3-year contract extension
Wandy Rodríguez	May 30, 2014	Released
Cody Eppley	June 19, 2014	Released
Duke Welker	July 14, 2014	Released

Legend

- **^{a}** – Invited to training camp

== Notable achievements ==
=== Awards ===
Awards

**2014 Major League Baseball All-Star Game**

- Andrew McCutchen, OF, starter
- Tony Watson, P, reserve
- Josh Harrison, OF, reserve

**NL Player of the Month**

- Andrew McCutchen (June)
- Josh Harrison (August)

**NL Player of the Week**

- Andrew McCutchen (June 9–June 15 and July 7–July 13)

**NL Silver Slugger Awards**

- Andrew McCutchen (OF)
- Neil Walker (2B)

=== Milestones ===
Milestones

Regular season
Player	Milestone	Reached
J. Grilli	500th Career Inning Pitched	April 2, 2014
F. Liriano	200th Career Game	April 26, 2014
P. Álvarez	500th Career Game	May 2, 2014
T. Watson	200th Career Game	May 22, 2014
I. Davis	500th Career Game	June 10, 2014
J. Grilli	400th Career Game	June 11, 2014
R. Martin	500th Career Walk	June 15, 2014
J. Gómez	100th Career Game	June 23, 2014
A. McCutchen	500th Career Run	June 25, 2014
J. Wilson	100th Career Game	June 27, 2014
P. Álvarez	100th Career Home Run	July 8, 2014
C. Morton	500th Career Strike-out	August 5, 2014
T. Snider	500th Career Game	August 8, 2014
R. Martin	1000th Career Hit	August 13, 2014
E. Volquez	1000th Career Inning Pitched	August 23, 2014
G. Sánchez	500th Career Hit	September 7, 2014
J. Harrison, N. Walker, A. Lambo	Triple play *Pirates' first since April 12, 2009; *First in Pittsburgh since August 10, 1993; *First career for each player involved	September 14, 2014
A. McCutchen	200th Career Double	September 26, 2014

== Statistics ==
=== Hitting ===
Note: G = Games played; AB = At bats; H = Hits; Avg. = Batting average; HR = Home runs; RBI = Runs batted in

Regular season
Player	G	AB	H	Avg.	HR	RBI
J. Gómez	41	1	1	1.000	0	0
T. Watson	75	3	1	0.333	0	0
J. Harrison	143	520	164	0.315	13	52
A. McCutchen	146	548	172	0.314	25	83
C. Stewart	49	136	40	0.294	0	10
S. Marte	135	495	144	0.291	13	56
R. Martin	111	379	110	0.290	11	67
J. Tabata	80	174	49	0.282	0	17
N. Walker	137	512	139	0.271	23	76
T. Sanchez	26	75	20	0.267	2	13
T. Snider	140	322	85	0.264	13	38
A. Lambo	21	39	10	0.256	0	1
J. Mercer	149	506	129	0.255	12	55
W. Rodríguez^{‡}	6	8	2	0.250	0	0
C. Barmes	48	102	25	0.245	0	7
I. Davis^{†}	131	336	79	0.235	10	46
G. Polanco	89	277	65	0.235	7	33
P. Álvarez	122	398	92	0.231	18	56
G. Sánchez	123	262	60	0.229	7	33
T. Ishikawa^{‡}	15	34	7	0.206	1	3
B. Morel	23	39	7	0.179	0	4
G. Cole	22	46	8	0.174	1	2
M. Martínez	26	39	5	0.128	0	2
B. Cumpton	14	17	2	0.118	0	1
F. Liriano	28	45	5	0.111	0	0
J. Locke	20	45	5	0.111	0	0
J. Nix	16	36	4	0.111	0	1
V. Worley	19	32	2	0.063	0	0
C. Morton	23	40	2	0.050	0	1
E. Volquez	30	53	2	0.038	0	2
J. Decker	5	5	0	0.000	0	0
M. Hague	3	2	0	0.000	0	0
J. Hughes	60	2	0	0.000	0	0
V. Mazzaro	4	1	0	0.000	0	0
B. Morris^{‡}	19	1	0	0.000	0	0
S. Pimentel	18	5	0	0.000	0	0
J. Wilson	67	1	0	0.000	0	0
J. Axford	13	0	0	—	0	0
C. d'Arnaud	8	0	0	—	0	0
E. Frieri^{†}	14	0	0	—	0	0
J. Grilli^{‡}	21	0	0	—	0	0
J. Holdzkom	9	0	0	—	0	0
B. LaFromboise	6	0	0	—	0	0
M. Melancon	70	0	0	—	0	0
C. Sadler	6	0	0	—	0	0
Team Totals		5,536	1,436	0.259	156	659
MLB Rank		17	6	5	6	9

Postseason
Player	G	AB	H	Avg.	HR	RBI
J. Harrison	1	4	2	0.500	0	0
S. Marte	1	4	1	0.250	0	0
R. Martin	1	4	1	0.250	0	0
A. McCutchen	1	3	0	0.000	0	0
J. Mercer	1	4	0	0.000	0	0
B. Morel	1	1	0	0.000	0	0
G. Sánchez	1	3	0	0.000	0	0
T. Snider	1	2	0	0.000	0	0
J. Tabata	1	2	0	0.000	0	0
E. Volquez	1	1	0	0.000	0	0
N. Walker	1	4	0	0.000	0	0
J. Holdzkom	1	0	0	—	0	0
J. Hughes	1	0	0	—	0	0
B. LaFromboise	1	0	0	—	0	0
M. Melancon	1	0	0	—	0	0
J. Wilson	1	0	0	—	0	0
Team Totals		32	4	0.125	0	0

=== Pitching ===
Note: G = Games pitched; IP = Innings pitched; W = Wins; L = Losses; ERA = Earned run average; SO = Strikeouts

Regular season
Player	G	IP	W	L	ERA	SO
T. Watson	78	77 1/3	10	2	1.63	81
M. Melancon	72	71	3	5	1.90	71
J. Hughes	63	64 1/3	7	5	1.96	36
J. Holdzkom	9	9	1	0	2.00	14
B. LaFromboise	6	3 2/3	0	0	2.45	4
V. Worley	18	110 2/3	8	4	2.85	79
E. Volquez	32	192 2/3	13	7	3.04	140
J. Gómez	44	62	2	2	3.19	38
F. Liriano	29	162 1/3	7	10	3.38	175
V. Mazzaro	5	10 1/3	0	0	3.48	7
G. Cole	22	138	11	5	3.65	138
C. Morton	26	157 1/3	6	12	3.72	126
B. Morris^{‡}	21	23 2/3	4	0	3.80	14
J. Locke	21	131 1/3	7	6	3.91	89
J. Axford	13	11	0	1	4.09	12
J. Wilson	70	60	3	4	4.20	61
J. Grilli^{‡}	22	20 1/3	0	2	4.87	21
B. Cumpton	16	70	3	4	4.89	46
S. Pimentel	20	32 2/3	2	1	5.23	38
W. Rodríguez^{‡}	6	26 2/3	0	2	6.75	20
C. Sadler	6	10 1/3	0	1	7.84	7
E. Frieri^{†}	14	10 2/3	1	1	10.13	10
T. Snider	1	1	0	0	18.00	1
Team Totals		1,456 1/3	88	74	3.47	1,228
MLB Rank		14	T–8	T–21	8	18

Post–Season
Player	G	IP	W	L	ERA	SO
B. LaFromboise	1	2/3	0	0	0.00	0
M. Melancon	1	1	0	0	0.00	1
J. Wilson	1	1/3	0	0	0.00	1
J. Holdzkom	1	1	0	0	9.00	1
E. Volquez	1	5	0	1	9.00	3
J. Hughes	1	1	0	0	18.00	1
Team Totals		9	0	1	8.00	7

Legend

- Stats reflect time with the Pirates only.

^{†} – Denotes player was acquired during season.
^{‡} – Denotes player was relinquished during season.

=== Team ===
==== Hitting ====
Regular season
Inning	AB	H	Avg.	HR	RBI
1st	618	155	.251	13	85
2nd	613	166	.275	22	69
3rd	604	153	.253	17	65
4th	641	180	.281	22	89
5th	623	177	.284	22	79
6th	613	149	.243	14	57
7th	614	152	.248	15	71
8th	642	180	.280	14	87
9th	441	96	.218	14	46
Extra	127	28	.220	3	11
Totals	5,536	1,436	.259	156	659

Post–Season
Inning	AB	H	Avg.	HR	RBI
1st	3	0	.000	0	0
2nd	4	1	.250	0	0
3rd	3	0	.000	0	0
4th	3	0	.000	0	0
5th	3	0	.000	0	0
6th	4	1	.250	0	0
7th	4	1	.250	0	0
8th	5	1	.200	0	0
9th	3	0	.000	0	0
Extra	0	0	.000	0	0
Totals	32	4	.125	0	0

==== Pitching ====
Regular season
Inning	NP	H	ERA	TBF	SO
1st	2,675	156	4.00	706	137
2nd	2,513	132	2.50	654	157
3rd	2,471	140	3.22	671	141
4th	2,572	163	3.89	698	134
5th	2,481	139	3.78	682	122
6th	2,541	154	3.78	684	111
7th	2,558	158	3.50	686	130
8th	2,516	144	2.89	668	159
9th	1,968	126	4.26	531	106
Extra	562	29	2.52	150	31
Totals	22,857	1,341	3.47	6,130	1,228

Post–Season
Inning	NP	H	ERA	TBF	SO
1st	8	0	0.00	3	0
2nd	20	1	0.00	5	1
3rd	10	1	0.00	4	0
4th	25	3	36.00	7	1
5th	14	0	0.00	3	1
6th	27	1	9.00	6	2
7th	19	3	18.00	6	0
8th	23	2	9.00	6	1
9th	10	0	0.00	3	1
Extra	0	0	0.00	0	0
Totals	156	11	8.00	43	7

== Draft picks ==
2014 Top 10 Rounds Draft Picks
Rd	#	Player	Pos	DOB and Age	School	Signed
1	24	Cole Tucker	SS	July 3, 1996 (aged 17)	Mountain Pointe HS (AZ)	6/12/2014
CB A	39	Connor Joe	OF	August 16, 1992 (aged 21)	San Diego	6/17/2014
2	64	Mitch Keller	RHP	April 4, 1996 (aged 18)	Xavier HS (IA)	6/14/2014
CB B	73	Trey Supak	RHP	May 31, 1996 (aged 18)	La Grange HS (TX)	6/14/2014
3	100	Jordan Luplow	RF	September 26, 1993 (aged 20)	Fresno State	6/17/2014
4	131	Taylor Gushue	C	December 19, 1993 (aged 20)	Florida	6/12/2014
5	161	Michael Suchy	RF	April 15, 1993 (aged 21)	Florida Gulf Coast	6/11/2014
6	191	Tyler Eppler	RHP	January 5, 1993 (aged 21)	Sam Houston State	6/11/2014
7	221	Nelson Jorge	SS	December 14, 1995 (aged 18)	International Baseball Academy (PR)	6/14/2014
8	251	Austin Coley	RHP	July 14, 1992 (aged 21)	Belmont	6/12/2014
9	281	Kevin Krause	C	November 23, 1992 (aged 21)	Stony Brook	6/17/2014
10	311	Alex McRae	RHP	April 6, 1993 (aged 21)	Jacksonville	6/11/2014

Note

- Age at time of draft.

== Farm system ==
Level	Team	League	Manager
AAA	Indianapolis Indians	International League	Dean Treanor
AA	Altoona Curve	Eastern League	Carlos García
A	Bradenton Marauders	Florida State League	Tom Prince
A	West Virginia Power	South Atlantic League	Michael Ryan
A-Short Season	Jamestown Jammers	New York–Penn League	Brian Esposito
Rookie	Bristol Pirates	Appalachian League	Edgar Varela
Rookie	GCL Pirates	Gulf Coast League	Milver Reyes
Rookie	DSL Pirates	Dominican Summer League	Mendy López
