= Iván DeJesús Jr. =

Puerto Rican baseball player (born 1987)

Iván De Jesús Jr.
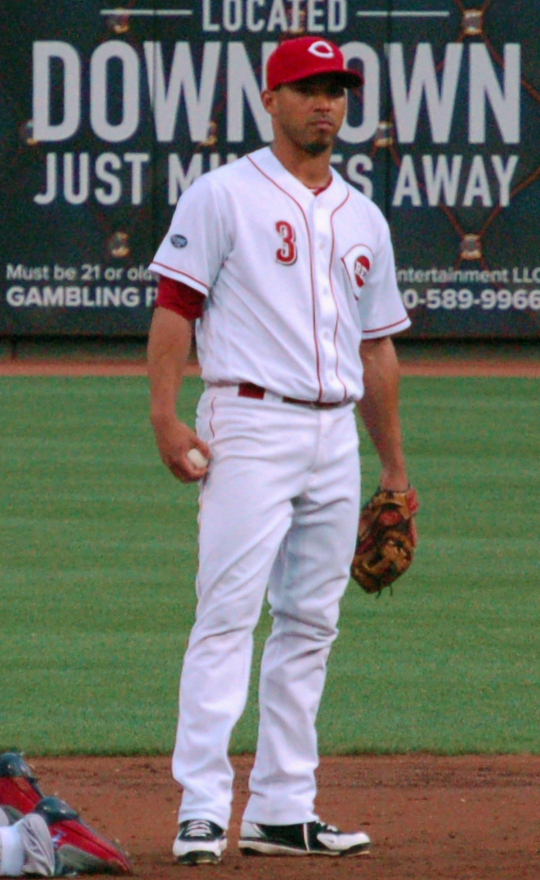
- DeJesús with the Cincinnati Reds in 2016
- Infielder
- Born: May 1, 1987 (age 39); Guaynabo, Puerto Rico
- Batted: Right Threw: Right

MLB debut
- April 1, 2011, for the Los Angeles Dodgers

Last MLB appearance
- October 2, 2016, for the Cincinnati Reds

MLB statistics
- Batting average: .242
- Home runs: 5
- Runs batted in: 53
- Stats at Baseball Reference

Teams
- Los Angeles Dodgers (2011–2012); Boston Red Sox (2012); Cincinnati Reds (2015–2016)

Iván De Jesús Jr. (born May 1, 1987) is a Puerto Rican former professional baseball infielder. He played in Major League Baseball (MLB) for the Los Angeles Dodgers, Boston Red Sox, and Cincinnati Reds. Born in Guaynabo, Puerto Rico, he went to high school at American Military Academy of Guaynabo and was selected by the Los Angeles Dodgers' in the 2005 Major League Baseball draft. DeJesus Jr. is the son of former major leaguer Iván DeJesús and a former major league batboy.

His Major League Baseball (MLB) debut with the Dodgers occurred early in the 2011 Major League Baseball season. He later split time between the Major Leagues and various Triple-A affiliates, earning Triple-A All-Star recognition in 2014.

== Career ==
=== Los Angeles Dodgers ===
In 1987, he was born in Guaynabo, Puerto Rico. He went to high school at American Military Academy of Guaynabo, Puerto Rico. When his father was hitting coach for the Houston Astros organization, he served as batboy. DeJesus Jr. was the Los Angeles Dodgers' 2nd selection and 51st overall selection of the 2005 Major League Baseball draft.

In 2005, he split time between the GCL Dodgers of the Gulf Coast League and the Ogden Raptors of the Pioneer Baseball League. He has played with the Columbus Catfish of the South Atlantic League in 2006 and with the Inland Empire 66ers of San Bernardino of the California League in 2007. He spent the 2008 season with the Jacksonville Suns of the Southern League. He was selected to play for the South Division of the Southern League All-Star Game, but he instead played in the 2008 All-Star Futures Game. He ended 2008 with a 23-game hitting streak. He finished second in the Southern League with 76 walks and tied for third with 150 hits. He was selected to the Baseball America Minor League All-Star Second Team as a second baseman. DeJesús was named 2008 minor league player of the year for the Dodgers organization. DeJesús had been the Dodgers' sixth highest rated prospect and best defensive infielder prior to 2007. He was listed as the #12 Dodger prospect prior to 2008 by Scout.com and #13 by Baseball America.

DeJesús played in the 2008 Arizona Fall League and the 2008–2009 Puerto Rican Winter League. The Dodgers invited him to Major League camp as a non-roster player for spring training, however he broke his left leg in a home plate collision during a spring training game. He returned to play four games for the Arizona League Dodgers in late August. The Dodgers added him to their 40 man roster prior to the 2010 season and promoted him to the Triple-A Albuquerque Isotopes, where he hit .296 in 130 games. He played for the Phoenix Desert Dogs in the Arizona Fall League after the season.

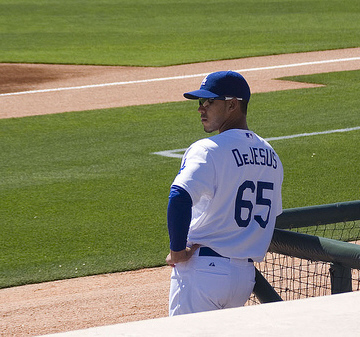
DeJesús with the Los Angeles Dodgers in 2011 spring training

He made his Major League debut on April 1, 2011, against the San Francisco Giants. He played in two games with the Dodgers, striking out five times in seven at-bats before being optioned back to Triple–A Albuquerque on April 6. He was recalled to the Dodgers on April 12 when Rafael Furcal was placed on the disabled list. He recorded his first Major League hit on April 16 against the St. Louis Cardinals. On April 23, he took the field at the same time as his father when the Dodgers' pitched in the bottom of the eight inning at Wrigley Field. With the Cubs batting, his father was performing his third base coaching duties, while Junior entered the game as a defensive replacement. This was the first occurrence for a regular season game. After being sent back to Triple–A on May 13, and aside from a brief stint in the majors from June 4–6, he spent the rest of the season with the Isotopes, hitting .310 with 8 home runs and 59 RBI in 443 plate appearances and 100 games. Following the conclusion of the 2011 Triple–A season, DeJesús was not among the post season callups by the 2011 Dodgers. for whom he had only had 35 plate appearances.

DeJesús lost his chance to make the opening day roster in 2012 when he suffered a torn oblique muscle in his side during a spring training game. On May 3, he began his rehabilitation with Albuquerque. The Dodgers recalled DeJesús on May 19. On June 1, 2012, DeJesús was part of a Dodgers lineup that featured the sons of five former Major Leaguers (along with Tony Gwynn Jr., Jerry Hairston Jr., Dee Gordon and Scott Van Slyke). This was the first time in Major League history that this had occurred. It was also the first time a starting infield of four major league sons had ever occurred: first baseman Van Slyke, second baseman Hairston, third baseman De Jesus and shortstop Gordon.

DeJesús was optioned to Albuquerque in late June. On July 16, 2012, Isotopes manager Lorenzo Bundy decided to start DeJesús in left field. It was DeJesús' first outfield appearance after 686 games of professional baseball. However, during his six innings in the outfield no balls were hit to left field. In 2012, DeJesús hit .273 in 23 games with the Dodgers and .295 in 60 games with the Isotopes.

=== Boston Red Sox ===
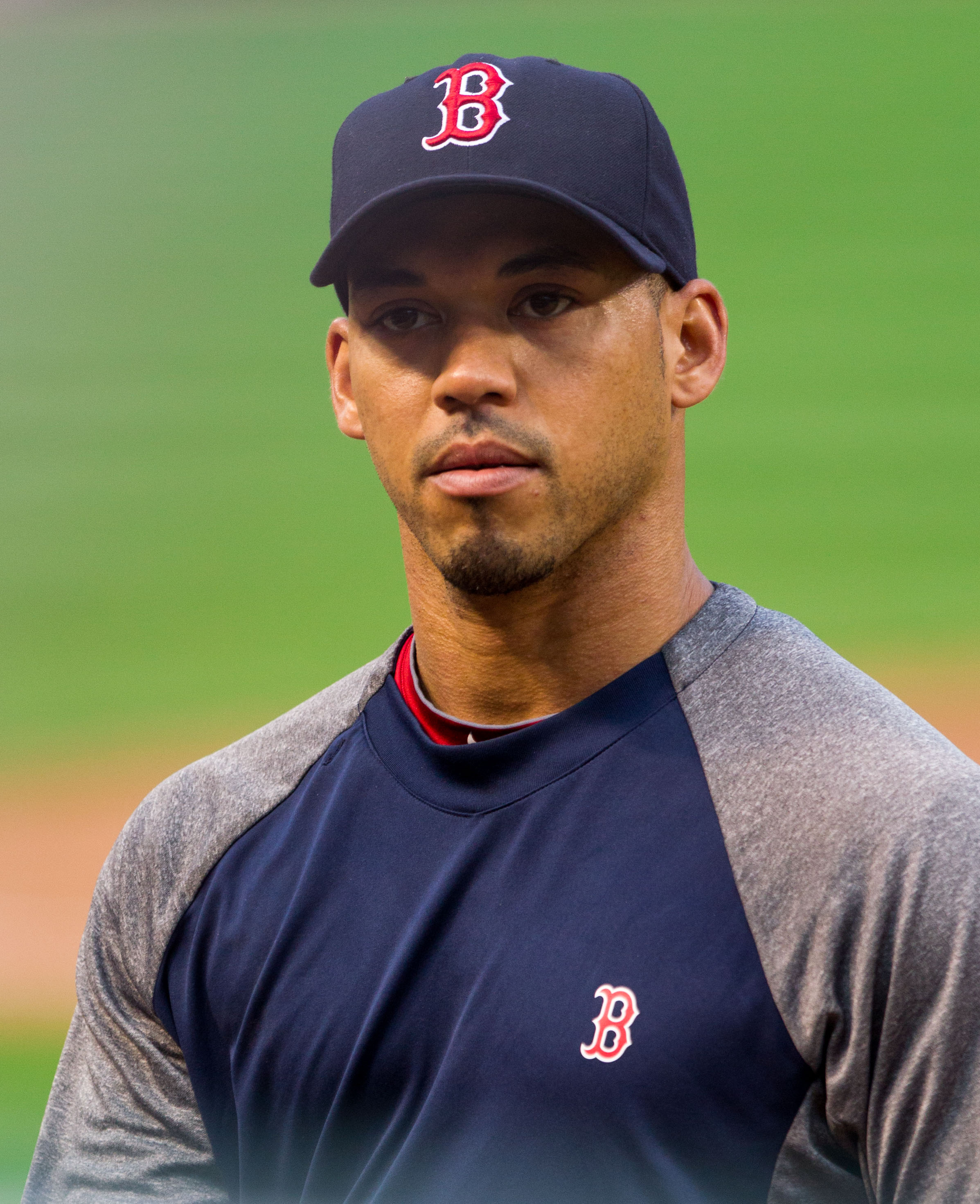
DeJesús during his tenure with the Boston Red Sox in 2012

On August 25, 2012, DeJesús was traded to the Boston Red Sox along with James Loney, Allen Webster and two players to be named later (Jerry Sands and Rubby De La Rosa) for Adrián González, Josh Beckett, Carl Crawford, Nick Punto and $11 million in cash. On August 26, DeJesús was optioned to Triple-A Pawtucket. After batting .385 in his first seven games in the International League, he was called up to the Red Sox on September 2. With the Red Sox he had 8 at-bats and did not record a hit, striking out 6 times, including the final out of the season. He was designated for assignment by the Red Sox on November 20, 2012, and removed from the 40-man roster.

=== Pittsburgh Pirates ===
On December 26, 2012, the Red Sox traded DeJesús (along with Stolmy Pimentel, Jerry Sands and Mark Melancon) to the Pittsburgh Pirates for Brock Holt and Joel Hanrahan. DeJesús spent the 2013 season with the Triple-A Indianapolis Indians of the International League. In 103 games with Indianapolis he hit .319/.380/.457 with 3 home runs and 32 RBI. Following the season, he became a Minor League free agent.

=== Baltimore Orioles ===
On December 19, 2013, DeJesús signed a minor league contract with the Baltimore Orioles. He began the 2014 season with the Triple-A Norfolk Tides of the International League. He was named to the Triple-A All-Star Game in Durham, North Carolina. In 113 games with Norfolk, DeJesús hit .282/.358/.389 with 5 HR and 56 RBI as the team's shortstop.

=== Boston Red Sox (second stint) ===
On August 30, 2014, DeJesús was traded with Jemile Weeks to the Boston Red Sox in exchange for Kelly Johnson and Michael Almanzar. DeJesús was assigned to Triple-A Pawtucket. On September 12, DeJesús tallied the game-winning two-run home run in the 13th inning of game 4 of the International League Championship Series against the Durham Bulls to force a decisive game 5. Pawtucket won the International League Championship the next day.

=== Cincinnati Reds ===
On November 23, 2014, DeJesús signed a minor league contract with the Cincinnati Reds, and subsequently played all four infield positions in 50 games for the Triple-A Louisville Bats, batting .303 with 16 RBI, prompting a call up to the Reds on June 3, 2015, after left fielder Marlon Byrd fractured his wrist during a game against the Philadelphia Phillies. He played for the Reds on June 5 against San Diego and then had his first major league home run on June 8 against Philadelphia.

DeJesús Jr. was sent outright to Triple-A Louisville on November 4, 2016. He elected free agency on November 13.

=== Milwaukee Brewers ===
On December 12, 2016, DeJesús signed a minor league contract with the Milwaukee Brewers. DeJesús hit .345 with 7 home runs and 65 RBI for the Colorado Springs Sky Sox. He elected free agency following the season on November 6, 2017.

=== Boston Red Sox (third stint) ===
On January 2, 2018, DeJesús signed a minor league deal with the Boston Red Sox that included an invitation to Spring training. Despite an impressive spring training, he was assigned to the Triple–A Pawtucket Red Sox where he began the 2018 season. In 97 games for Pawtucket, he batted .261/.331/.341 with four home runs and 31 RBI. DeJesús elected free agency following the season on November 2.

=== Long Island Ducks ===
On March 14, 2019, DeJesús signed with the Long Island Ducks of the independent Atlantic League of Professional Baseball.

=== Chicago White Sox ===
On May 7, 2019, DeJesús's contract was purchased by the Chicago White Sox, and he was assigned to the Triple-A Charlotte Knights. He was released on July 8, 2019, after batting .238, slugging .347 and posting a .317 on base percentage in 22 games.

=== Minnesota Twins ===
On July 11, 2019, DeJesús signed a minor league contract with the Minnesota Twins and was assigned to the Double-A Pensacola Blue Wahoos. He was released on August 30.

=== Lexington Legends ===
On August 20, 2020, DeJesús signed with the Lexington Legends on the Battle of the Bourbon Trail. He became a free agent after the 2020 season.

On July 13, 2024, DeJesús announced his retirement from professional baseball.

== See also ==
- List of Major League Baseball players from Puerto Rico
