= Chris Stewart (baseball) =

American baseball player (born 1982)

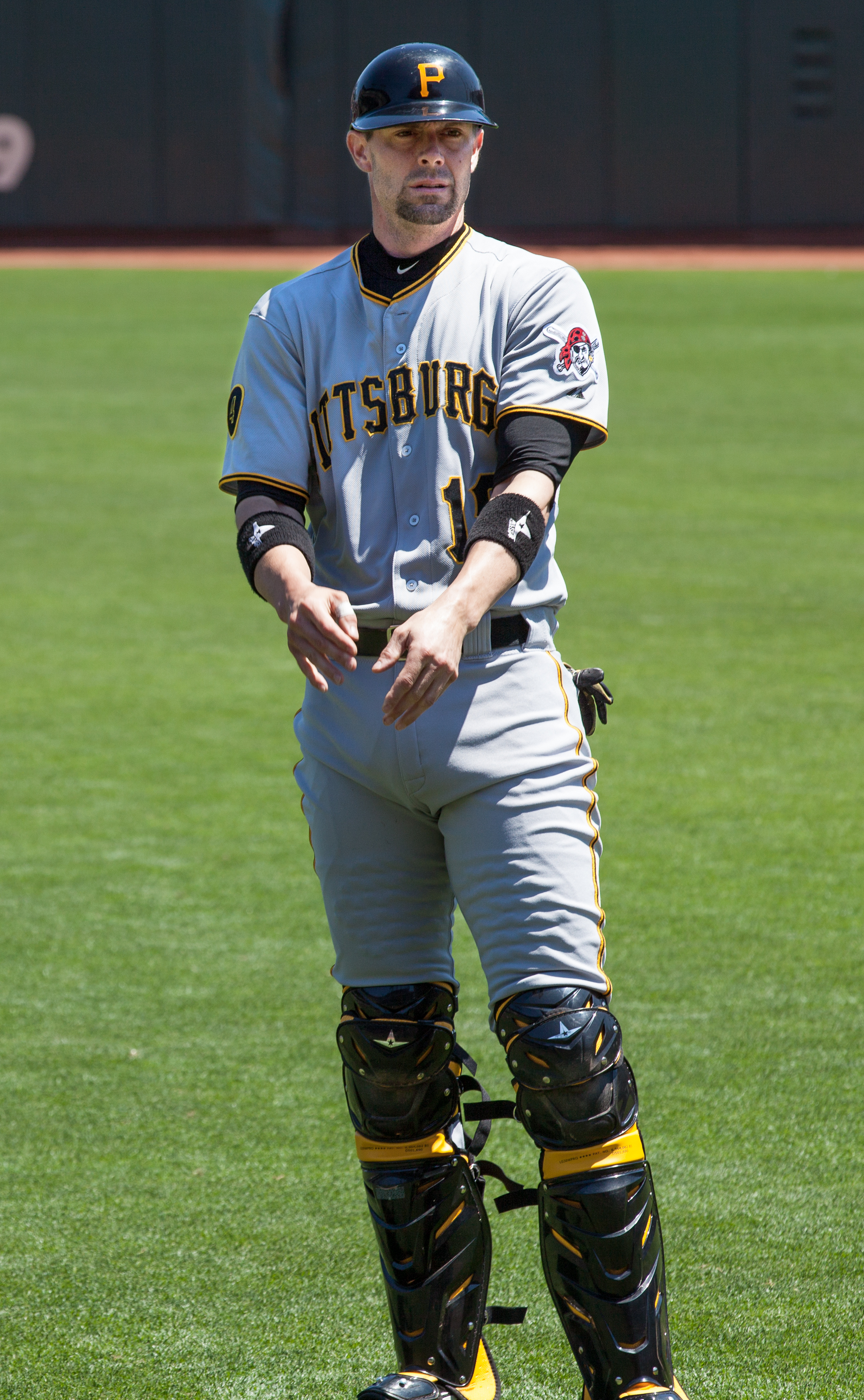
- Stewart with the Pittsburgh Pirates
- Catcher
- Born: February 19, 1982 (age 43); Fontana, California, U.S.
- Batted: Right Threw: Right

MLB debut
- September 6, 2006, for the Chicago White Sox

Last MLB appearance
- September 25, 2018, for the Arizona Diamondbacks

MLB statistics
- Batting average: .230
- Home runs: 9
- Runs batted in: 90
- Stats at Baseball Reference

Teams
- Chicago White Sox (2006); Texas Rangers (2007); New York Yankees (2008); San Diego Padres (2010); San Francisco Giants (2011); New York Yankees (2012–2013); Pittsburgh Pirates (2014–2017); Atlanta Braves (2018); Arizona Diamondbacks (2018)

Christopher David Stewart (born February 19, 1982) is an American former professional baseball catcher. He played in Major League Baseball (MLB) for the Chicago White Sox, Texas Rangers, New York Yankees, San Diego Padres, San Francisco Giants, Pittsburgh Pirates, Atlanta Braves, and Arizona Diamondbacks.

== Amateur career ==
Born in Fontana, California, Stewart attended Canyon Springs High School in Moreno Valley, California. After graduating high school in 2000, Stewart attended Riverside Community College for one season before turning professional. During his freshman season at Riverside, Stewart hit .361 with a .509 slugging percentage.

== Professional career ==
=== Chicago White Sox ===
The Chicago White Sox selected Stewart in the 12^{th} round of the 2001 Major League Baseball draft. He signed with the White Sox that year on August 18. Stewart began his professional career in 2002 with the Chicago White Sox rookie-level affiliate, the Bristol White Sox of the Appalachian League. With Bristol, Stewart batted .278 with 25 runs, 44 hits, nine doubles, one home run and 12 runs batted in (RBIs). On defense that season, Stewart committed eight errors in 377 total chances. During the 2003 season, Stewart was assigned to the Winston-Salem Warthogs of the Class-A Advanced Carolina League.

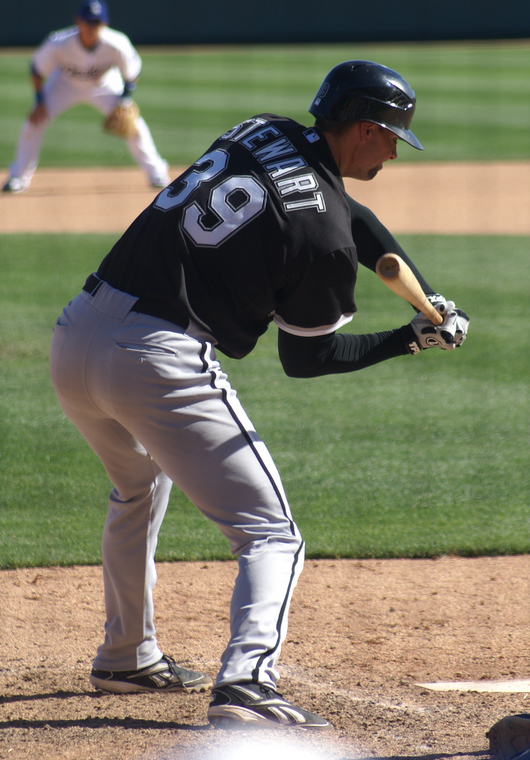
Stewart with the Chicago White Sox in 2009 spring training

In 2004, Stewart split his time, first playing Triple-A ball with the Charlotte Knights of the International League and then Double-A baseball with the Birmingham Barons of the Southern League. Stewart stayed with the Barons for the 2005 minor league baseball season. In 2006, Stewart was promoted back up to Triple-A with the Charlotte Knights and put on the White Sox's 40-man roster and made his Major League debut on September 6, 2006.

Stewart appeared in four games for the White Sox before making his first start on September 27, 2006. In his 8 major league at bats, Stewart had no hits and two strikeouts.

=== Texas Rangers ===
Stewart was traded to the Texas Rangers on January 12, 2007, for minor league pitcher John Lujan.

After showing solid defensive skills in spring training, Stewart beat out veteran Miguel Ojeda for the Rangers backup catcher job, and started the season on the major league roster. On June 9, 2007, the Rangers optioned Stewart to Triple-A after acquiring Adam Melhuse in a trade. Stewart went to 2008 spring training with the Rangers before being released on March 27, 2008.

=== New York Yankees ===
On April 3, 2008, Stewart signed a minor league contract with the New York Yankees and was assigned to their Triple-A affiliate, the Scranton/Wilkes-Barre Yankees. He was called up following the injury to Yankee catcher Jorge Posada on April 28, 2008. He was sent down after only appearing in one game on April 30, after Chad Moeller cleared waivers and re-joined the team. Stewart was designated for assignment on June 30 to make room on the roster for Brett Gardner and later outrighted to the minors.

=== Second stint with White Sox ===
Stewart became a free agent after the season and re-signed with the Chicago White Sox.

=== Second stint with Yankees ===
On March 22, 2009, Stewart returned to the Yankees by being traded for a player to be named later (PTBNL).

=== San Diego Padres ===
Stewart signed a minor league contract with the San Diego Padres on December 22, 2009. Stewart was called up to join the Padres on September 1, 2010. He was designated for assignment by the Padres on October 6, he was outrighted to the minors but he refused the assignment and became a free agent.

=== San Francisco Giants ===
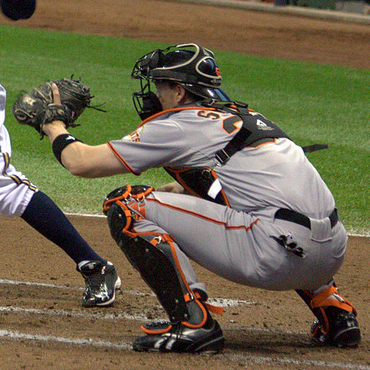
Stewart playing for the San Francisco Giants in 2011

Stewart signed with the San Francisco Giants for the 2011 season. They called him up to the majors on May 26 after Buster Posey was placed on the 15-day disabled list with a fractured bone in his lower left leg. On August 9, 2011, he hit his first big-league home run against the Pittsburgh Pirates' James McDonald.

=== Third stint with Yankees ===
The New York Yankees traded for Stewart on April 4, 2012, in exchange for reliever George Kontos. He served as the backup to Russell Martin for the 2012 season, with Francisco Cervelli playing in Triple-A.

Before the start of the 2013 season, Yankees' manager Joe Girardi estimated Stewart would play in 60 games; he played in over 100. On July 20, 2013, against the rival Red Sox, Stewart turned one of the more memorable double plays of the year. With Daniel Nava on first, Dustin Pedroia popped up behind home plate. Stewart threw his mask off and dived into the stands to make a spectacular catch, nearly toppling over. Noticing that Nava started to run for second, Stewart quickly regained balance and threw a laser to the second baseman to throw out Nava. Stewart's efforts helped secure a 5–2 victory for the Yankees.

=== Pittsburgh Pirates ===
On December 2, 2013, the Yankees traded Stewart to the Pittsburgh Pirates for cash or a player to be named later. Stewart resigned with the Pirates on a two-year deal with a team option for 2018, worth a potential $4.25 million on January 19, 2016. On November 3, 2017, the Pirates declined his 2018 option.

=== Atlanta Braves ===
Stewart signed a one-year contract with the Atlanta Braves on February 14, 2018. He was designated for assignment on April 4, 2018. On August 22, Stewart's contract was selected by the Braves to temporarily act as the back-up for Tyler Flowers as Kurt Suzuki suffered a contusion near his elbow. Stewart was later designated for assignment again on August 26.

=== Arizona Diamondbacks ===
On August 30, Stewart was traded to the Arizona Diamondbacks for cash considerations.

=== Second stint with Padres ===
On January 24, 2019, Stewart signed a minor league deal with the San Diego Padres. He was released on June 9.

=== Retirement ===
Stewart announced his retirement from professional baseball on July 12, 2019.

== Player profile ==
Stewart has a reputation as an excellent defensive catcher. He contributes to the team with his ability to frame pitches, which saves his team runs. Stewart also excels at throwing out potential base stealers; in 2011 with the Giants Stewart caught 39% of base stealers and in 2013 with the Yankees, Stewart caught 31% of base stealers.

== Personal life ==
Stewart and his wife, Lindsey, have two children; a son, Sebastian Carter, and a daughter, Brooklyn Jean. He is represented by Arizona-based sports and entertainment attorney, Jim Kuzmich.
