= Stolmy Pimentel =

Dominican baseball player (born 1990)

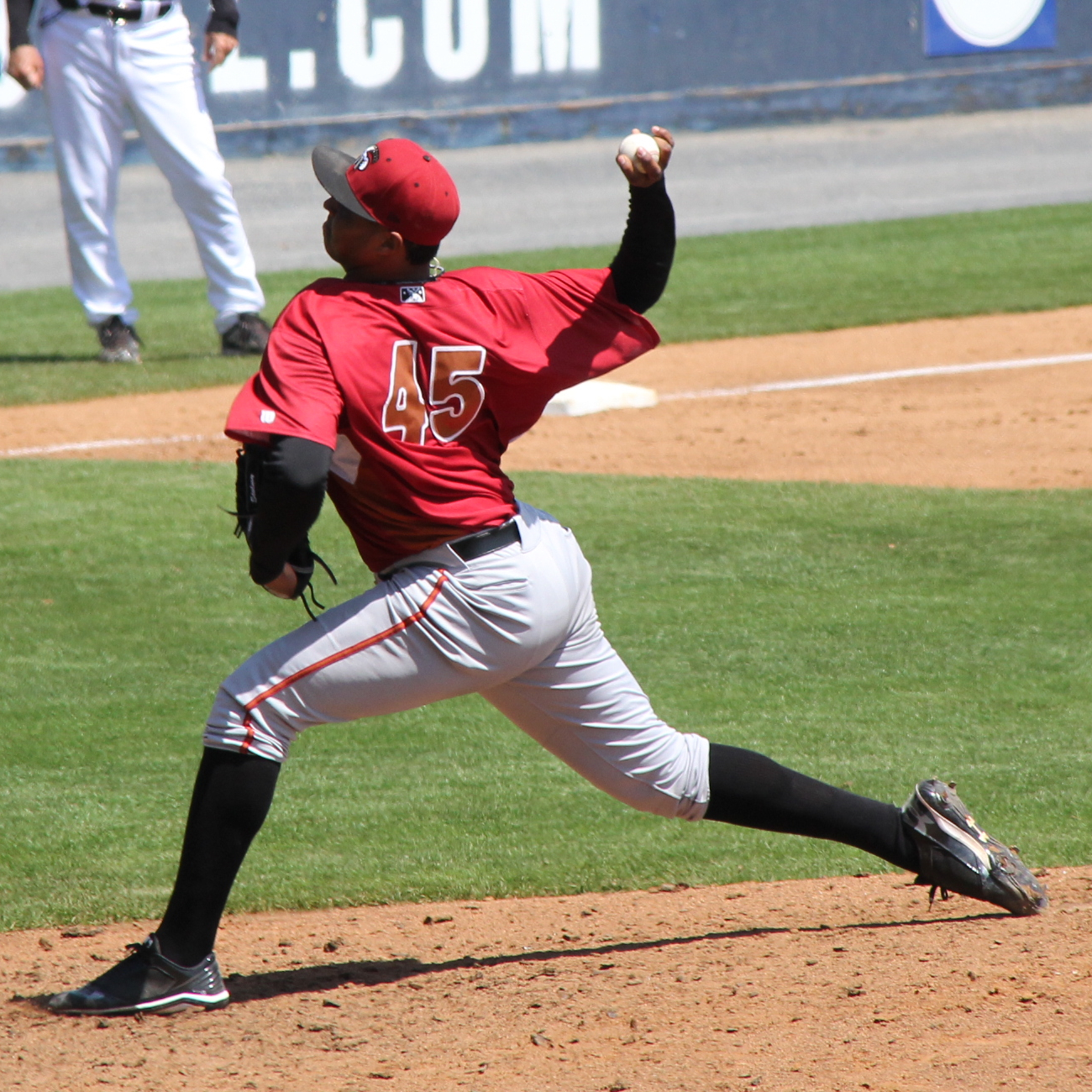
- Pimentel with the Altoona Curve, the Double-A affiliate of the Pittsburgh Pirates, in 2013
- Pitcher
- Born: February 1, 1990 (age 36); San Cristóbal, Dominican Republic
- Batted: Right Threw: Right

MLB debut
- September 4, 2013, for the Pittsburgh Pirates

Last MLB appearance
- May 12, 2015, for the Texas Rangers

MLB statistics
- Win–loss record: 2–2
- Earned run average: 4.39
- Strikeouts: 54
- Stats at Baseball Reference

Teams
- Pittsburgh Pirates (2013–2014); Texas Rangers (2015)

Stolmy Ramón Pimentel (born February 1, 1990) is a Dominican former professional baseball pitcher. He played in Major League Baseball (MLB) for the Pittsburgh Pirates and the Texas Rangers.

== Professional career ==
=== Boston Red Sox ===
He was signed by the Boston Red Sox as an international free agent on July 2, 2006, as a 16-year-old by then Boston Scout Luis Scheker. He made his debut the next season with the DSL Red Sox, going 3–1 with a 2.90 ERA in 13 starts. He made the trip to America for the 2008 season, playing it with Low-A Lowell, going 5–2 with a 3.14 ERA in 11 starts. He played 2009 with Single-A Greenville, going 10–7 with a 3.82 ERA in 23 starts. He played 2010 with High-A Salem going 9–11 with a 4.06 ERA in 26 starts. Despite the worst season of his short career, he was nominated to the All-Star Futures Game facing 2 batters, Logan Morrison and Danny Espinosa, retiring them both. In the offseason, Pimentel signed a one-year, $414,000 deal, protecting him from the Rule V Draft. He started 2011 with Double-A Portland, but he went 0–9 with a 9.12 ERA in 15 starts, leading to a demotion back to Salem. He finished the season 6–13 with a 6.79 ERA in 25 starts.

=== Pittsburgh Pirates ===
On December 26, 2012, the Red Sox traded him (along with Mark Melancon, Jerry Sands and Iván DeJesús Jr.) to the Pittsburgh Pirates for Brock Holt and Joel Hanrahan. He made his MLB debut on September 4, 2013, for the Pirates. He pitched out of the bullpen, and made five appearances in 2013. Pimentel started the 2014 season on the Pirates Opening Day roster.

Pimentel was designated for assignment by the Pirates on April 5, 2015.

=== Texas Rangers ===
The Texas Rangers claimed Pimentel on waivers on April 11, 2015.

=== New York Mets ===
On November 24, 2015, Pimentel signed a minor league deal with the New York Mets. In 14 games for the Triple–A Las Vegas 51s, he struggled immensely to an 0–4 record and 10.45 ERA with 29 strikeouts across 31.0 innings pitched. Pimentel was released by the Mets organization on June 6, 2016.

=== Guerreros de Oaxaca ===
On July 7, 2016, Pimentel signed with the Guerreros de Oaxaca of the Mexican League. He made 7 starts for Oaxaca, posting a 1–4 record and 4.65 ERA with 25 strikeouts across 40 2/3 innings of work. Pimentel was released by the Guerreros on September 23.

== Coaching career ==
On February 5, 2024, the Chicago White Sox hired Pimentel to serve as the assistant pitching coach for their rookie–level affiliate, the Dominican Summer League White Sox.

== Scouting report ==
Pimentel has 4 pitches: a four-seam fastball, a 12-6 curveball, a changeup and a two-seam cut fastball. His four-seamer ranges from 92 to 95, his cutter is 89–92, his curve around the low 70s, and his changeup around 78–82. He is an aggressive pitcher.
