= Travis Snider =

American baseball player (born 1988)

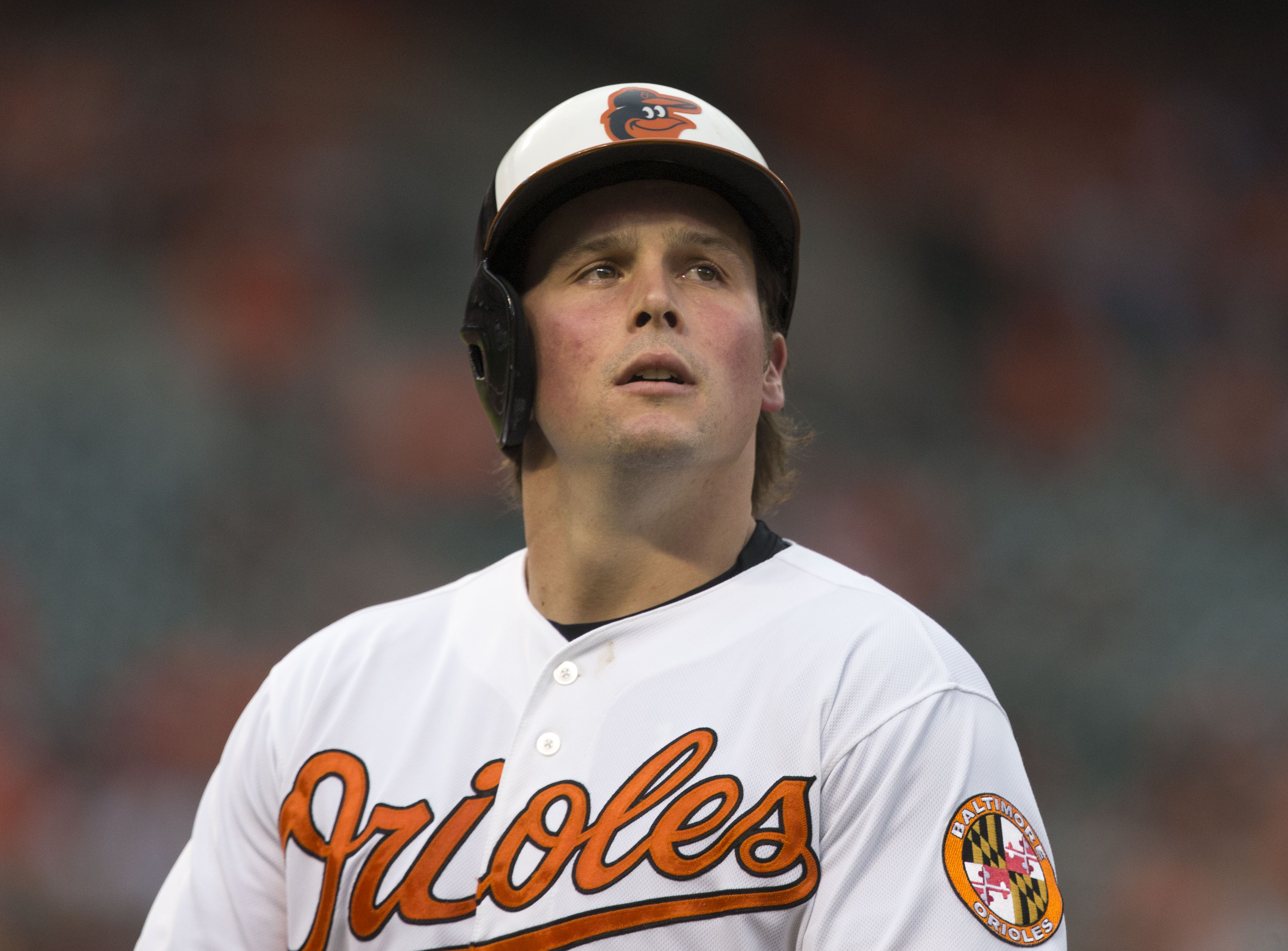
- Snider with the Baltimore Orioles in 2015
- Outfielder
- Born: February 2, 1988 (age 38); Kirkland, Washington, U.S.
- Batted: Left Threw: Left

MLB debut
- August 29, 2008, for the Toronto Blue Jays

Last MLB appearance
- October 4, 2015, for the Pittsburgh Pirates

MLB statistics
- Batting average: .244
- Home runs: 54
- Runs batted in: 212
- Stats at Baseball Reference

Teams
- Toronto Blue Jays (2008–2012); Pittsburgh Pirates (2012–2014); Baltimore Orioles (2015); Pittsburgh Pirates (2015)

Travis James Snider (born February 2, 1988) is an American former professional baseball outfielder. Nicknamed Lunchbox, he played in Major League Baseball (MLB) for the Toronto Blue Jays, Pittsburgh Pirates, and Baltimore Orioles.

== Amateur career ==
Snider played for the Mill Creek Little League team at 1999 Little League Western Regional Tournament in San Bernardino, California. He attended Henry M. Jackson High School, where he played as an outfielder for the baseball team and as a running back and linebacker in football.

== Professional career ==
=== Toronto Blue Jays ===
The Toronto Blue Jays selected Snider in the first round, with the 14th overall selection, of the 2006 MLB draft. Snider began his professional career in 2006 with the Pulaski Blue Jays in the Appalachian League. He excelled in his debut and ended up winning the Short Season Player of The Year honors for Appalachian League.

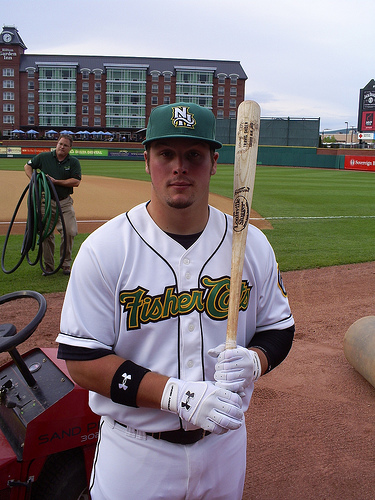
Snider with the New Hampshire Fisher Cats

In 2007, he was promoted to the Class A Lansing Lugnuts, he spent the whole season in Lansing and ranked among the league leaders in many hitting categories, including RBI (93, first), doubles (35, first), hits (143, T-third), home runs (16, T-fifth) and batting average (.313, fifth). He represented Lansing in the 2007 Midwest League All-Star Game.

Snider began the 2008 season with the Dunedin Blue Jays of the Florida State League. Coming out of spring training he had suffered an injury to his throwing elbow so for the first portion of the season he was the team's designated hitter exclusively. Snider performed well in High-A and he was promoted to the Double-A New Hampshire Fisher Cats of the Eastern League on May 21, 2008. Initially at Double-A, Snider struggled but as he regained his health and started to play in the outfield again he began hitting well. Snider won the Eastern League Home Run Derby with an impressive performance, hitting 10 home runs in the semifinals in front of a record crowd at the Fisher Cats stadium. Snider was nicknamed "the Franchise" by New Hampshire Union Leader reporter Kevin Gray. On August 6, 2008, the Blue Jays promoted Snider to Triple-A Syracuse Chiefs of the International League. Snider continued to play well at Triple-A and would only play 18 games at that level before being promoted. Overall, in 133 combined minor league games, he batted .275 with 23 home runs and 91 RBI.

==== 2008–2010 ====
Snider was promoted to the Toronto Blue Jays on August 29, 2008, and became the youngest position player in the majors. He made his debut later that day, playing left field and batting ninth at Yankee Stadium. Facing Carl Pavano, Snider lined out to shortstop in his first at-bat. He later doubled off Pavano for his first big-league hit. On September 4, 2008, Snider launched his first career home run at Rogers Centre off Kevin Slowey of the Minnesota Twins, becoming the fourth-youngest Blue Jay to hit a home run. After his first season with Toronto, he finished hitting .301 with two home runs and 13 RBI in 24 games.

Baseball America ranked Snider sixth on their annual ranking of the best baseball prospects, moving him up five spots from the previous year's rankings.

On April 6, 2009, Snider recorded a home run and double on Opening Day against the Detroit Tigers. He had his first career two home run game on April 13, 2009, against the Minnesota Twins and became the youngest player in Blue Jays history to hit two home runs in a game. He was sent back to Triple-A Las Vegas 51s in May, after a prolonged hitting slump, but was recalled by the Blue Jays in August, going on to hit a home run in his first game back.

On August 2, 2010, Snider became the first Blue Jays player since 1978 to hit two doubles in one inning against the New York Yankees (pitchers A. J. Burnett and Boone Logan). This was part of an AL record tying six doubles in an inning by the Blue Jays.

==== 2011 ====
After opening the season with just a .184 batting average with a home run and 12 RBI through 25 games, Snider was optioned to Triple-A Las Vegas on April 28. On July 3, he was recalled by the Blue Jays. On the nights of July 8 and July 20, Snider had 5 RBI – a career best.

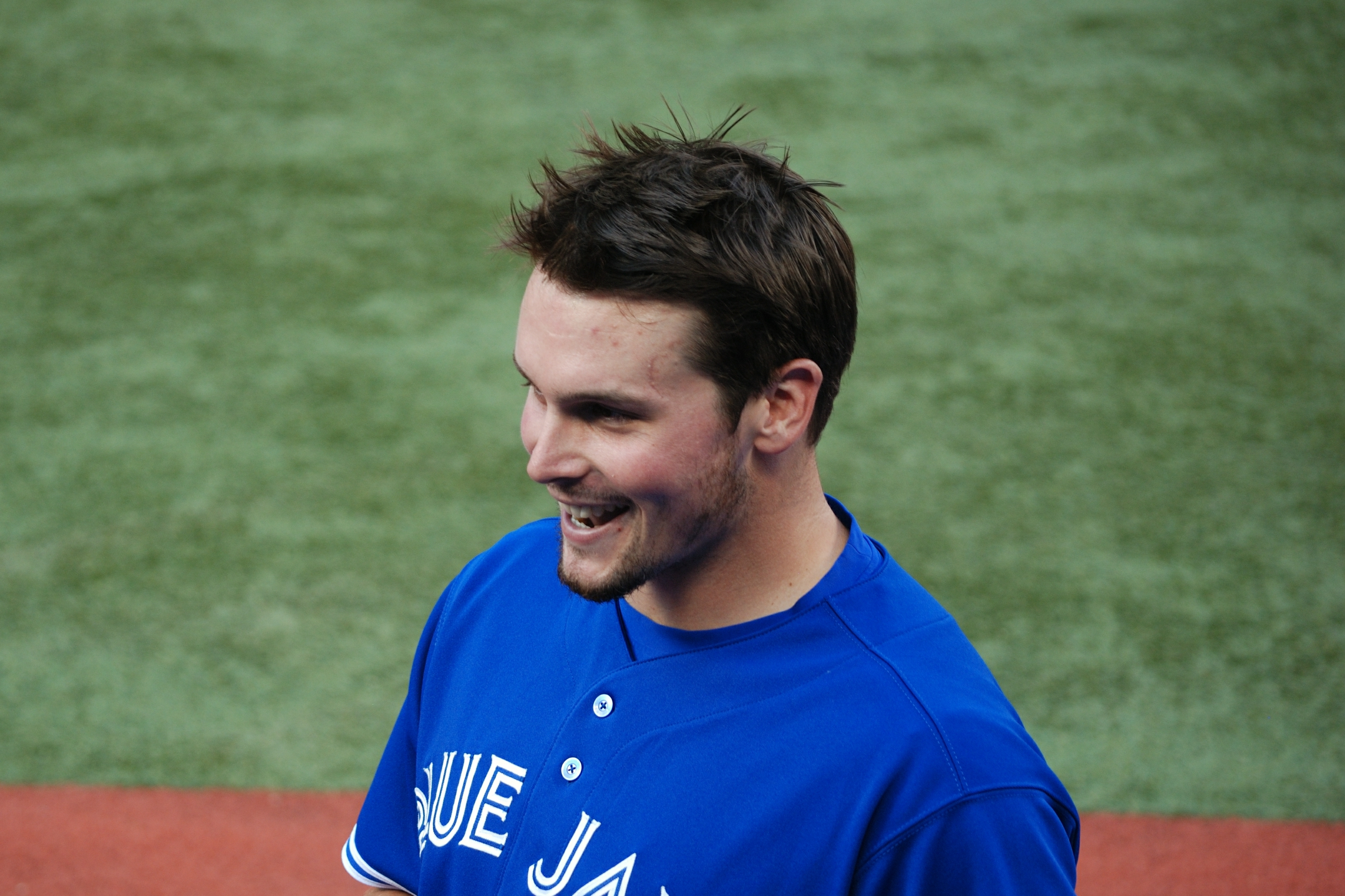
Travis Snider in 2012

On August 4, Snider was optioned back to Triple-A Las Vegas to make room for Brett Lawrie. He was diagnosed with tendinitis in his right wrist on August 25, ending his 2011 season.

==== 2012 ====
Snider was a spring training invitee, but was optioned to Triple-A Las Vegas before the end of spring. He was in competition with Eric Thames for the starting left field position. He was recalled to the Blue Jays on July 20. Mid-game against the Seattle Mariners on July 30, Snider was traded to the Pittsburgh Pirates in exchange for pitcher Brad Lincoln.

=== Pittsburgh Pirates ===
In 50 games with the Pirates to finish 2012, Snider hit .250 with a home run and 9 RBI.

==== 2013 ====
Snider began 2013 in a platoon in right field with José Tábata, with Garrett Jones also getting occasional starts when he wasn't at first base. The platoon dissolved when Tábata went on the disabled list with a strained oblique, and Snider got most of the starts during Tábata's stint on the DL. To that point, Snider was hitting .252 with two home runs, 14 RBI and 31 strikeouts. After hitting .171 in June, Snider was relegated to a pinch-hitting role upon Tábata's return on July 3. On July 28, Snider was placed on the disabled list with discomfort in his left big toe, which had been bothering him for over a month. Snider was activated from the disabled list when the rosters expanded on September 1, and was used in a pinch-hitting role to finish the season. In 111 games (53 starts) in 2013, Snider hit .215/.281/.333 with five home runs and 25 RBI.

==== 2014 ====
On June 18, 2014, Snider pitched the top of ninth inning against the Cincinnati Reds. He allowed two runs, one hit, and two walks in that inning but managed to strike out Joey Votto. Snider finished the 2014 season with a .264 average with 13 home runs and 38 RBI in 140 games.

=== Baltimore Orioles ===
On January 27, 2015, Snider was traded to the Baltimore Orioles in exchange for minor league pitcher Stephen Tarpley and a player to be named later, eventually revealed as minor league pitcher Steven Brault. He was designated for assignment on August 7, and released on August 15.

=== Pittsburgh Pirates (second stint) ===
On August 19, 2015, Snider signed a minor league deal to return to the Pirates. He elected free agency on October 22.

=== Kansas City Royals ===
On January 30, 2016, Snider signed a minor league contract with the Kansas City Royals, with an invitation to spring training. He was released on March 30, and re-signed to a minor league contract on April 1. He was released on July 30.

=== Texas Rangers ===
On January 6, 2017, Snider signed a minor league contract with the Texas Rangers.

=== New York Mets ===
On August 15, 2017, the Rangers traded Snider to the New York Mets for cash. In 17 games for the Triple–A Las Vegas 51s, Snider hit .308/.375/.415 with 1 home run and 8 RBI. He elected free agency following the season on November 6.

=== Long Island Ducks ===
On April 5, 2018, Snider signed with the Long Island Ducks of the independent Atlantic League of Professional Baseball. He became a free agent following the 2018 season. In 94 games he hit .290/.374/.463 with 13 home runs, 71 RBIs and 4 stolen bases.

=== Arizona Diamondbacks ===
On January 9, 2019, Snider signed a minor league contract with the Arizona Diamondbacks. In 93 games for the Triple–A Reno Aces, he batted .294/.402/.497 with 11 home runs and 41 RBI. Snider elected free agency following the season on November 4.

On January 15, 2020, Snider re-signed with the Diamondbacks organization, and was released on May 22 with having appeared in a game.

=== Miami Marlins ===
On July 24, 2020, Snider signed a minor league contract with the Miami Marlins. Snider did not play in a game in 2020 due to the cancellation of the minor league season because of the COVID-19 pandemic. On August 27, Snider was released by the Marlins organization.

=== Atlanta Braves ===
On February 23, 2021, Snider signed a minor league contract with the Atlanta Braves organization. Snider played in 63 games for the Triple-A Gwinnett Braves, hitting .174 with four home runs and 15 RBI. On September 12, Snider was released by the Braves.

Snider announced his retirement from professional baseball on January 13, 2022.

== Personal life ==
From Lynnwood, Washington, Snider faced many challenges in his teen years. In a two-year span he had lost two grandparents, a coach, and a close friend. He then later lost his mother in an accident. Snider says this made his teen years tough but also helped him work hard to get to the major leagues.

== Awards ==
- 2008 – Eastern League All-Star Team
- 2008 – Eastern League Home Run Derby Champion
- 2007 – Arizona Fall League All-Prospect Team
- 2007 – AFL Rising Stars
- 2007 – Baseball America Low Class A All-Star
- 2007 – Baseball America Minor League All-Star
- 2007 – Midwest League Post-Season All-Star
- 2007 – MID Mid-Season All-Star
- 2007 – MID Player of the Week
- 2007 – MID Player of the Week
- 2006 – Topps Short-Season/Rookie All-Star
- 2006 – Topps APP Player of the Year
- 2006 – Baseball America Rookie All-Star
- 2006 – Topps APP Player of the Month
- 2006 – Appalachian League Player of the Year
- 2006 – APP Post-Season All-Star
- 2006 – APP Player of the Week
- 2006 – APP Player of the Week

== See also ==
- USA Today All-USA high school baseball team

Preceded by Cameron Maybin	Youngest Player in the American League; 2008	Succeeded by Rick Porcello
