= Brandon Cumpton =

American baseball player (born 1988)

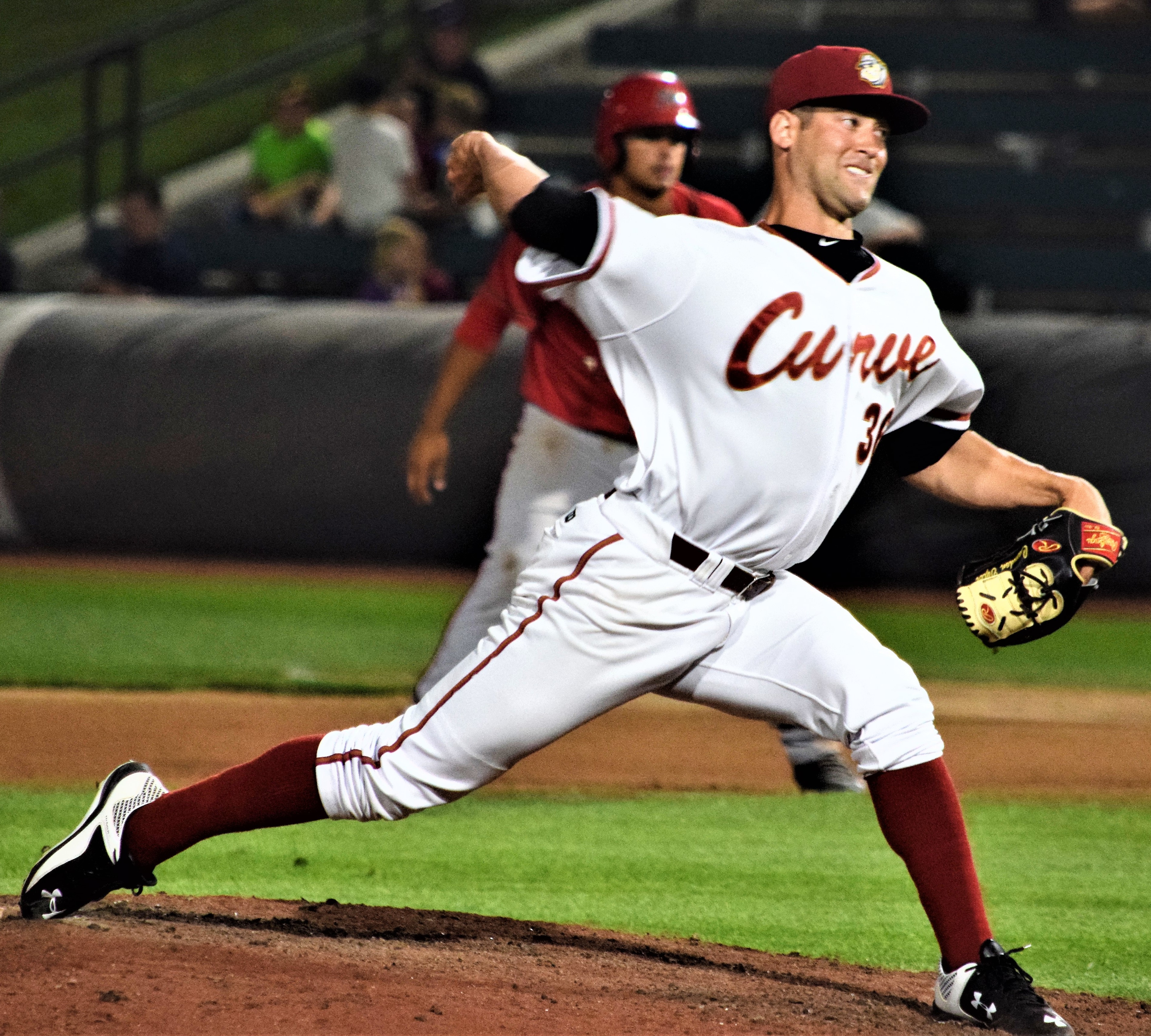
- Cumpton with the Altoona Curve in 2017
- Pitcher
- Born: November 16, 1988 (age 37); Augusta, Georgia, U.S.
- Batted: Right Threw: Right

MLB debut
- June 15, 2013, for the Pittsburgh Pirates

Last MLB appearance
- July 31, 2018, for the Toronto Blue Jays

MLB statistics
- Win–loss record: 5–5
- Earned run average: 4.05
- Strikeouts: 70
- Stats at Baseball Reference

Teams
- Pittsburgh Pirates (2013–2014); Toronto Blue Jays (2018)

Brandon Tyler Cumpton (born November 16, 1988) is an American former professional baseball pitcher. He was selected by the Pittsburgh Pirates in the 9th round of the 2010 Major League Baseball draft and made his MLB debut for them in 2013. He attended the Georgia Institute of Technology (Georgia Tech), where he pitched for the Yellow Jackets. Cumpton also played for the Toronto Blue Jays.

== Amateur career ==
Cumpton attended Greenbrier High School in Evans, Georgia, and the Georgia Institute of Technology (Georgia Tech), where he played college baseball for the Georgia Tech Yellow Jackets baseball team. In 2008 and 2009, he played collegiate summer baseball with the Cotuit Kettleers of the Cape Cod Baseball League.

== Professional career ==
=== Pittsburgh Pirates ===
The Pittsburgh Pirates selected Cumpton in the ninth round of the 2010 Major League Baseball draft.

Cumpton's first call up to the major leagues came on June 15, 2013. He replaced the injured A. J. Burnett. In his major league debut that day, Cumpton pitched five innings (facing three batters in the sixth), allowing three earned runs and seven hits in a no decision against the Los Angeles Dodgers.

Despite a strong spring training, Cumpton started the 2014 season pitching for the Indianapolis Indians. On April 23, Cumpton was called up to replace the injured Wandy Rodríguez in the Pirates rotation. Cumpton made his first start of the 2014 season on April 24, giving up two earned runs on four hits in seven innings, earning the loss after receiving only one run of support in a 2–1 loss to the Cincinnati Reds. Cumpton recorded his first career hit on May 26, 2014, during an away game against the New York Mets. On May 31, Cumpton faced the team he made his Major League debut against, the Los Angeles Dodgers. Cumpton, ultimately, had his worst start to date, allowing ten earned runs in 3 2/3 innings pitched. His next two starts resulted in wins on June 6 and June 11 against the Milwaukee Brewers and Chicago Cubs, respectively.

Cumpton suffered a torn UCL during 2015 spring training, which necessitated Tommy John surgery. He officially underwent the procedure on March 10, 2015, and was unable to participate for the entire 2015 season. The surgery was performed by Dr. James Andrews. He was sent outright to Triple-A Indianapolis Indians on November 6, 2015.

Cumpton returned to action in 2017, and made minor league appearances for Triple–A Indianapolis, Double–A Altoona, and High–A Bradenton. In 24 combined appearances, he accumulated a 5–4 record and 3.86 ERA with 33 strikeouts in 37 1/3 innings pitched. He elected free agency following the season on November 6, 2017.

=== Texas Rangers ===
On January 10, 2018, Cumpton signed a minor league contract that included an invite to spring training with the Texas Rangers. He was released on March 20.

=== Southern Maryland Blue Crabs ===
On April 18, 2018, Cumpton signed with the Southern Maryland Blue Crabs of the Atlantic League of Professional Baseball. In 11 starts 65.2 innings of work he went 4-3 with a 4.11 ERA with 44 strikeouts.

=== Toronto Blue Jays ===
On July 5, 2018, Cumpton signed a minor league contract with the Toronto Blue Jays and was assigned to the Triple-A Buffalo Bisons. Cumpton was called up to the majors on July 31. He was designated for assignment on August 13, and then assigned outright back to Buffalo on August 16. Cumpton declared free agency on October 5, 2018.

=== Southern Maryland Blue Crabs (second stint) ===
On April 25, 2019, Cumpton signed with the Southern Maryland Blue Crabs of the Atlantic League of Professional Baseball. In 15 starts 83 innings he went 5-8 with a 4.88 ERA with 73 strikeouts also throwing 1 complete game shutout.

=== Pericos de Puebla ===
On July 24, 2019, Cumpton's contract was purchased by the Pericos de Puebla of the Mexican League. He was released on October 3. In 6 games (5 starts) 13.1 innings of work he struggled terribly going 0-4 with a 15.53 ERA and 7 strikeouts.

=== Diablos Rojos del México ===
On January 16, 2020, Cumpton signed with the Diablos Rojos del México of the Mexican League.

=== Winnipeg Goldeyes ===
On July 23, 2020, Cumpton signed with the Winnipeg Goldeyes of the American Association of Independent Professional Baseball. In 9 starts 43.2 innings he went 2-3 with a 4.53 ERA and 34 strikeouts.

=== Diablos Rojos del Mexico (second stint) ===
On September 11, 2020, Cumpton was returned to the Diablos he did not appear in a game for them. He began the 2021 season with the team, but struggled in 5 starts 20 innings he went 0-2 with an 8.55 ERA and 34 strikeouts.

=== Guerreros de Oaxaca ===
On June 14, 2021, Cumpton was traded to the Guerreros de Oaxaca of the Mexican League in exchange for P Héctor Hernández. He was released on November 23. In 12 games (4 starts) 26.1 innings he struggled mightily going 0-4 with a 7.52 ERA with 22 strikeouts and 1 save.
