= Bobby LaFromboise =

American baseball player (born 1986)

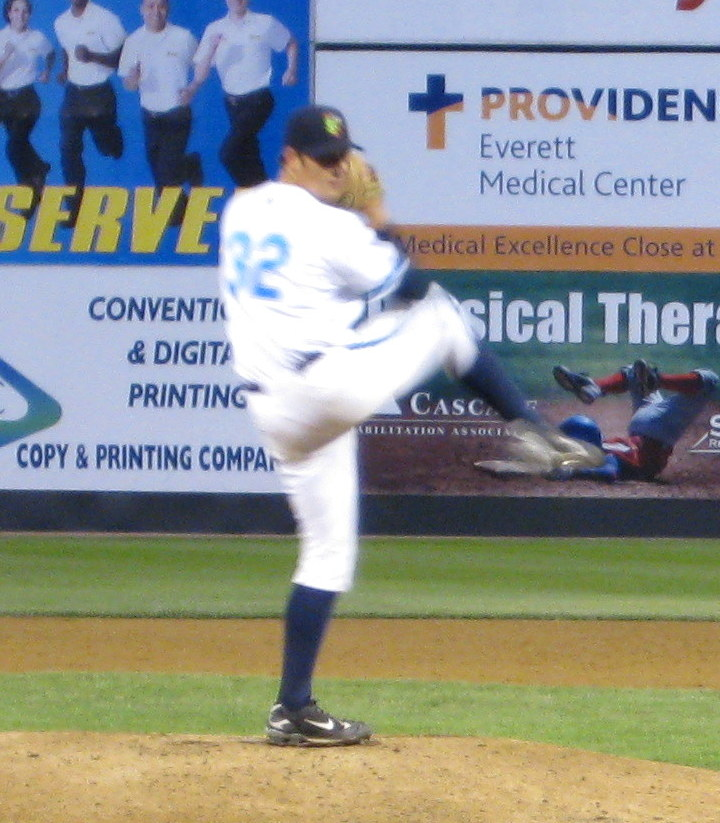
- LaFromboise with the Everett AquaSox in 2008
- Pitcher
- Born: June 25, 1986 (age 39); Downey, California, U.S.
- Batted: Left Threw: Left

MLB debut
- April 10, 2013, for the Seattle Mariners

Last MLB appearance
- October 3, 2015, for the Pittsburgh Pirates

MLB statistics
- Win–loss record: 0–1
- Earned run average: 3.63
- Strikeouts: 23
- Stats at Baseball Reference

Teams
- Seattle Mariners (2013); Pittsburgh Pirates (2014–2015)

Robert Joseph LaFromboise (born June 25, 1986) is an American former professional baseball pitcher. He played in Major League Baseball (MLB) for the Seattle Mariners and Pittsburgh Pirates. He was a Southern League All-Star in 2011 and 2012.

== Career ==
LaFromboise attended Warren High School in Downey, California, Rio Hondo College in Whittier, California, and the University of New Mexico. In 2008, he led the team with 63 strikeouts in 81 1/3 innings pitched, along with tossing two complete games.

=== Seattle Mariners ===
The Seattle Mariners drafted LaFromboise in the eighth round, with the 252nd overall selection, of the 2008 Major League Baseball draft. He made his professional debut with the Low-A Everett AquaSox, posting a 3.46 ERA in 13 games. LaFromboise spent 2009 with the Single-A Clinton LumberKings, accumulating an 8-9 record and 4.03 ERA with 119 strikeouts in 138 1/3 innings pitched across 33 games (19 starts).

LaFromboise spent the 2010 season with the High-A High Desert Mavericks. In 33 appearances (14 starts) for the team, he logged a 10-5 record and 4.51 ERA with 92 strikeouts across 113 2/3 innings pitched. LaFromboise spent 2011 with the Double-A Jackson Generals, posting a 3-4 record and 3.10 ERA with 53 strikeouts over 49 appearances out of the bullpen. He split the 2012 campaign between Jackson and the Triple-A Tacoma Rainiers. In 47 appearances for the two affiliates, LaFromboise compiled a combined 6-2 record and 1.36 ERA with 70 strikeouts and 6 saves across 66 1/3 innings pitched.

On November 20, 2012, the Mariners added LaFromboise to their 40-man roster to protect him from the Rule 5 draft. The Mariners promoted him to the major leagues for the first time on April 10, 2013. In 10 appearances for the Mariners during his rookie campaign, LaFromboise recorded a 5.91 ERA with 11 strikeouts over 10 2/3 innings pitched. On March 27, 2014, LaFromboise was designated for assignment by the Mariners following the signing of Chris Young.

=== San Diego Padres ===
LaFromboise was claimed off waivers by the San Diego Padres on April 2, 2014, and optioned to the Triple-A El Paso Chihuahuas. He was recalled on April 9 for a doubleheader against the Cleveland Indians, as the Padres' 26th man, but did not appear in either game and was returned to Triple-A immediately thereafter. LaFromboise was designated for assignment on August 20.

=== Pittsburgh Pirates ===
The Pittsburgh Pirates claimed LaFromboise on August 24, 2014, and optioned him to the Triple-A Indianapolis Indians. On September 2, LaFromboise was called up to the majors. He made his first postseason appearance for the Pirates, pitching in the 2014 National League Wild Card Game.

=== Philadelphia Phillies ===
On December 23, 2015, LaFromboise was claimed off waivers by the Los Angeles Angels. He was designated for assignment by the Angels following the waiver claim of Ronald Torreyes on January 25, 2016. On January 29, LaFromboise was claimed off waivers by the Philadelphia Phillies. He was designated for assignment following the acquisition of Taylor Featherston on February 10. On February 12, LaFromboise cleared waivers and was sent outright to the Triple-A Lehigh Valley IronPigs. In 13 relief outings for Lehigh, he struggled to a 1-3 record and 5.94 ERA with 8 strikeouts across 16 2/3 innings pitched. LaFromboise was released by the Phillies organization on June 3.

=== Texas Rangers ===
On February 13, 2017, LaFromboise signed a minor league contract with the Texas Rangers. He made 2 scoreless appearances for the rookie-level Arizona League Rangers, striking out 4 batters in 3 innings of work. LaFromboise was released by the Rangers organization on August 14.
