= John Holdzkom =

American baseball player (born 1987)

- Pitcher
- Born: October 19, 1987 (age 39); Pasadena, California, U.S.
- Batted: Right Threw: Right

MLB debut
- September 2, 2014, for the Pittsburgh Pirates

Last MLB appearance
- September 27, 2014, for the Pittsburgh Pirates

MLB statistics
- Win–loss record: 1–0
- Earned run average: 2.00
- Strikeouts: 14
- Stats at Baseball Reference

Teams
- Pittsburgh Pirates (2014)

John Stephen Holdzkom (born October 19, 1987) is an American former professional baseball relief pitcher. He made his Major League Baseball (MLB) debut with the Pittsburgh Pirates in 2014.

== Career ==
=== New York Mets ===
Holdzkom was drafted by the Seattle Mariners in the 15th round of the 2005 Major League Baseball draft out of Rancho Cucamonga High School in Rancho Cucamonga, California, but did not sign and attended Salt Lake Community College. He was then drafted by the New York Mets in the fourth round of the 2006 Major League Baseball draft and signed. Holdzkom made his professional debut with the GCL Mets, logging a 7.71 ERA in 16 appearances. The next year, Holdzkom split the year between the GCL Mets and the Kingsport Mets, posting a 4.91 ERA with 10 strikeouts in 11.0 innings of work. In 2008, he underwent Tommy John surgery and missed the 2009 season, returning to the Mets organization in 2010. In 2010, Holdzkom split the year between the GCL Mets and Kingsport, struggling to a 9.00 ERA in 6 appearances between the two teams. On March 24, 2011, Holdzkom was released by the Mets organization.

=== Cincinnati Reds ===
After not playing baseball in 2011, on January 5, 2012, Holdzkom signed a minor league contract with the Cincinnati Reds organization. He played for the High-A Bakersfield Blaze, recording a 5.19 ERA with 10 strikeouts in 8.2 innings pitched before he was released on June 21.

=== Amarillo Sox ===
Holdzkom signed with the Amarillo Sox of the American Association of Independent Professional Baseball for the 2013 season. In 34 games with the team, Holdzkom logged a 2-3 record and 3.50 ERA with 37 strikeouts in 36.0 innings of work.

=== Sioux City Explorers ===
On August 14, 2013, Holdzkom was traded to the Sioux City Explorers of the American Association. Holdzkom finished the year with the team, pitching 7.2 scoreless innings in 8 games with the team.

=== Amarillo Sox (second stint) ===
After pitching in 1 game for the San Angelo Colts of United League Baseball, Holdzkom re-joined the Amarillo Sox for the 2014 season. In 9 games for the team, he logged a 1.17 ERA with 7 strikeouts in 7.2 innings of work.

=== Pittsburgh Pirates ===
On June 24, 2014, Holdzkom was acquired by the Pittsburgh Pirates organization and assigned to the Double-A Altoona Curve. After posting 6.0 scoreless innings in Altoona, Holdzkom was promoted to the Triple-A Indianapolis Indians, where he recorded a 2.49 ERA in 18 appearances. Holdzkom was called up to the majors for the first time on September 2, 2014, and debuted against the St. Louis Cardinals in the 8th inning, striking out the side. Holdzkom made nine relief appearances for the Pirates in 2014, striking out 14 batters in nine innings pitched, sporting a 2.00 ERA on the year. He also pitched in the 2014 National League Wild Card Game against the San Francisco Giants.

Holdzkom did not make a major league appearances for the Pirates in 2015, spending the year split between the Low-A West Virginia Black Bears and Indianapolis, and pitched to a cumulative 2.96 ERA with 30 strikeouts in 23 appearances between the two teams. On April 3, 2016, Holdzkom was designated for assignment by the Pirates. He was released by the organization on April 11.

=== Chicago White Sox ===
On April 19, 2016, Holdzkom signed a minor league contract with the Chicago White Sox organization. Holdzkom made one appearance for the rookie–level Arizona League White Sox before suffering an injury and missing the remainder of the season. He elected free agency following the season on November 7.

=== Auckland Tuatara ===
On December 4, 2018, Holdzkom signed with the Auckland Tuatara of the Australian Baseball League for the 2018/19 season.

== International career ==
He represented New Zealand national baseball team at the 2013 World Baseball Classic Qualification. Holdzkom qualified for the team because he has a New Zealand father.

== Personal ==
Holdzkom's older brother Lincoln, who pitched for the New Zealand national baseball team, died of injuries sustained in a car crash on December 13, 2015.
