= Jerry Sands =

American baseball player (born 1987)

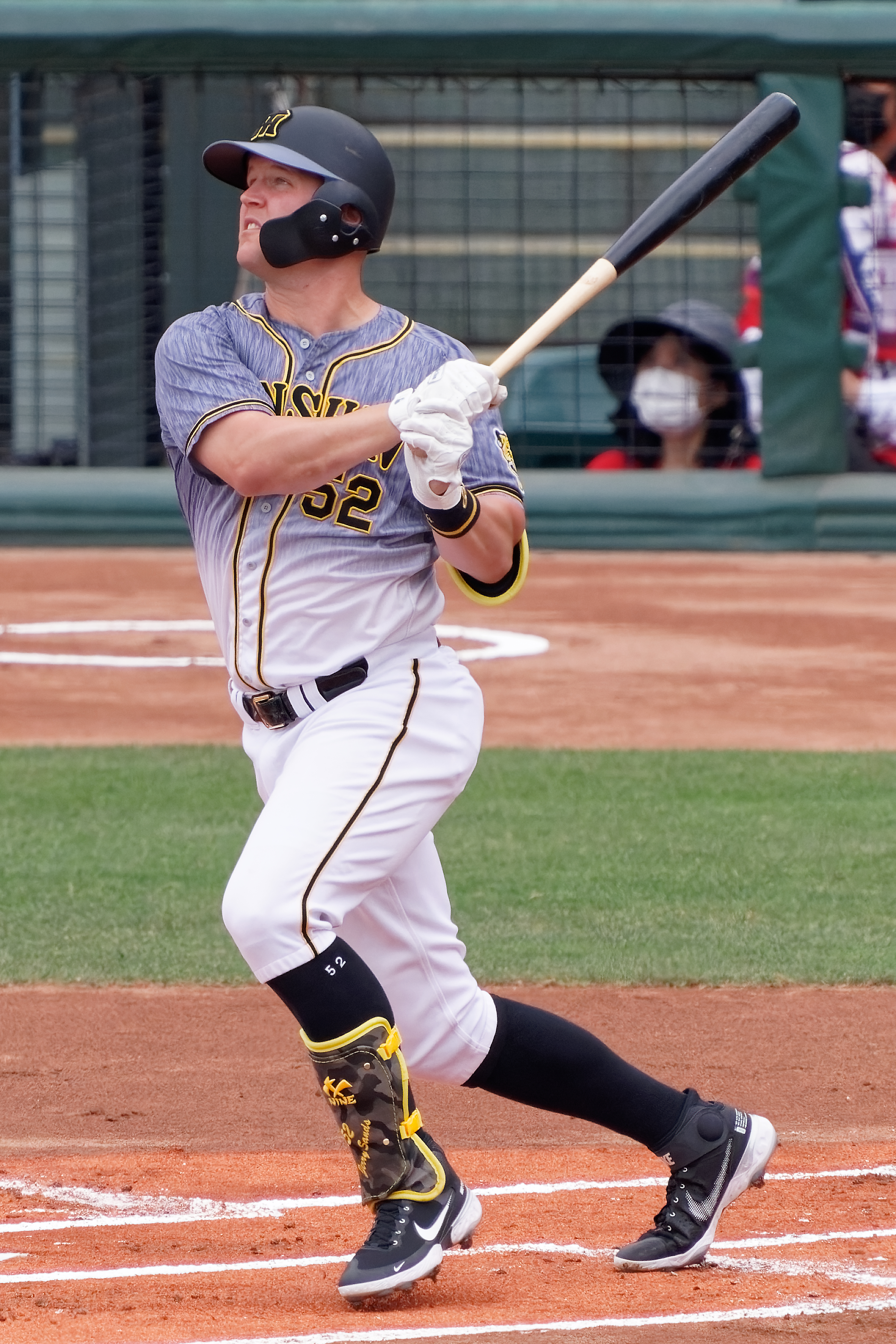
- Sands with the Hanshin Tigers in 2021
- Outfielder / First baseman
- Born: September 28, 1987 (age 38); Middletown, New York, U.S.
- Batted: Right Threw: Right

Professional debut
- MLB: April 18, 2011, for the Los Angeles Dodgers
- KBO: August 16, 2018, for the Nexen Heroes
- NPB: June 27, 2020, for the Hanshin Tigers

Last appearance
- MLB: June 4, 2016, for the Chicago White Sox
- KBO: September 29, 2019, for the Kiwoom Heroes
- NPB: September 30, 2021, for the Hanshin Tigers

MLB statistics
- Batting average: .238
- Home runs: 10
- Runs batted in: 57

KBO statistics
- Batting average: .306
- Home runs: 40
- Runs batted in: 150

NPB statistics
- Batting average: .252
- Home runs: 39
- Runs batted in: 129
- Stats at Baseball Reference

Teams
- Los Angeles Dodgers (2011–2012); Tampa Bay Rays (2014); Cleveland Indians (2015); Chicago White Sox (2016); Nexen / Kiwoom Heroes (2018–2019); Hanshin Tigers (2020–2021)

Career highlights and awards
- KBO: KBO League Golden Glove Award (2019); KBO RBI leader (2019)

Gerald Robert Sands (born September 28, 1987) is an American former professional baseball outfielder and first baseman. He was drafted by the Los Angeles Dodgers in the 25th round of the 2008 MLB draft out of Catawba College and made his Major League Baseball (MLB) debut with them in 2011. He also played in MLB for the Tampa Bay Rays, Cleveland Indians, Chicago White Sox, in the KBO League for the Kiwoom Heroes, and in Nippon Professional Baseball (NPB) for the Hanshin Tigers. Sands grew up in Smithfield, North Carolina and is a graduate of Smithfield-Selma High School.

== Professional career ==
=== Los Angeles Dodgers ===
Sands struggled in his first professional season with the Gulf Coast Dodgers in 2008, hitting only .205 in 46 games. However, he turned it around in 2009, hitting .350 with 14 home runs in 41 games for the Ogden Raptors and earning a berth on the Pioneer League all-star team and a late-season promotion to the Single-A Great Lakes Loons.

In 2010 with Great Lakes, Sands hit .333 in 69 games, along with 18 home runs and 46 RBI. He was named Midwest League player of the week three times and selected to appear in the mid-season all-star game. He hit a home run in the All-Star game and was named the Player of the Game. Right after the all-star game he was promoted to the Double-A Chattanooga Lookouts in the Southern League, where he homered in his first game with the Lookouts. He played in 68 games in Double-A and hit .270 with 17 home runs and 47 RBI. He was selected as the Dodgers "Minor League Player of the Year" and given an invite to Major League spring training. He was assigned to the Triple-A Albuquerque Isotopes in the Pacific Coast League to begin the 2011 season. In 10 games, he hit .400 with five home runs.

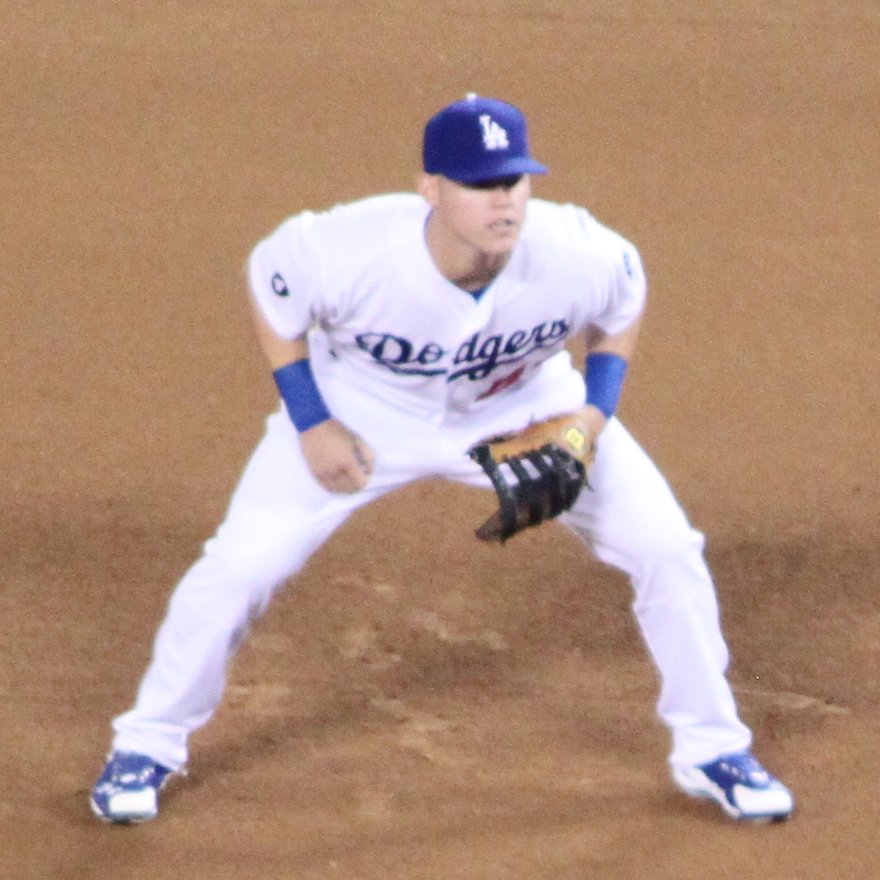
Sands playing first base for the Los Angeles Dodgers in 2011

Sands had his contract purchased by the Dodgers on April 18, 2011, and made his major league debut as the starting left fielder against the Atlanta Braves. In his first at-bat, he hit a double to right field off Tim Hudson. Sands hit his first Major League home run on May 21 off Mark Buehrle of the Chicago White Sox. On May 24, Sands hit his second home run, a grand slam, off J. A. Happ of the Houston Astros. He played in 41 games for the Dodgers, hitting only .200 and was sent back to Triple-A on June 8. Sands finished the Isotopes' season with a .278 batting average, 29 home runs and 88 RBI. He returned to the Dodgers after the minor league season ended and was much more productive, finishing his season with 24 hits in his last 59 at-bats to raise his batting average to .253 for the season in 61 games and he also hit 4 home runs.

In 2012, Sands only appeared in 9 games with the Dodgers, where he hit only .208 in 23 at-bats. Sands spent most of the season with Triple-A Albuquerque, where he was selected as the designated hitter on the post-season All-PCL All-Star team. In 119 games with the Isotopes, he hit .296 with 26 home runs and 107 RBI.

=== Pittsburgh Pirates ===
On October 4, 2012, the Dodgers traded Sands and Rubby De La Rosa to the Boston Red Sox, completing the blockbuster deal that brought Adrián González, Josh Beckett, Carl Crawford and Nick Punto to the Dodgers in August. On December 26, the Red Sox traded him (along with Stolmy Pimentel, Mark Melancon, and Iván DeJesús, Jr.) to the Pittsburgh Pirates in exchange for Brock Holt and Joel Hanrahan. He spent the entire 2013 season in Triple-A with the Indianapolis Indians and hit just .207 in 106 games with only seven home runs.

Sands was designated for assignment by the Pirates on December 13, 2013, following the signings of Edinson Vólquez and Clint Barmes.

=== Tampa Bay Rays ===
On December 23, 2013, Sands was claimed off waivers by the Tampa Bay Rays. He was designated for assignment following the acquisition of Pedro Figueroa on January 7, 2014. Two days later, Sands cleared waivers and was sent outright to the Triple-A Durham Bulls. On June 1, Sands was added to Tampa Bay's active roster following an injury to Wil Myers. He played in 12 games for the Rays, hitting .190 with one home run and four RBI prior to undergoing wrist surgery in July. On November 3, Sands was designated for assignment by the team. He cleared waivers and was sent outright to Durham on November 5. However, on November 9, it was reported that Sands had chosen to reject the assignment and elect free agency.

=== Cleveland Indians ===
On December 15, 2014, Sands signed a minor league contract with the Cleveland Indians. The Indians purchased his contract on April 10, 2015, and added him to the active roster. He was designated for assignment on April 29. He was called back up by the Indians on May 28. On May 30, in Sands' first at-bat since being called up, he hit a two-run shot for his sixth career home run. He was designated for assignment again the next day. He was called back up by the Indians on July 31. The Indians designated him for assignment on December 18.

=== Chicago White Sox ===
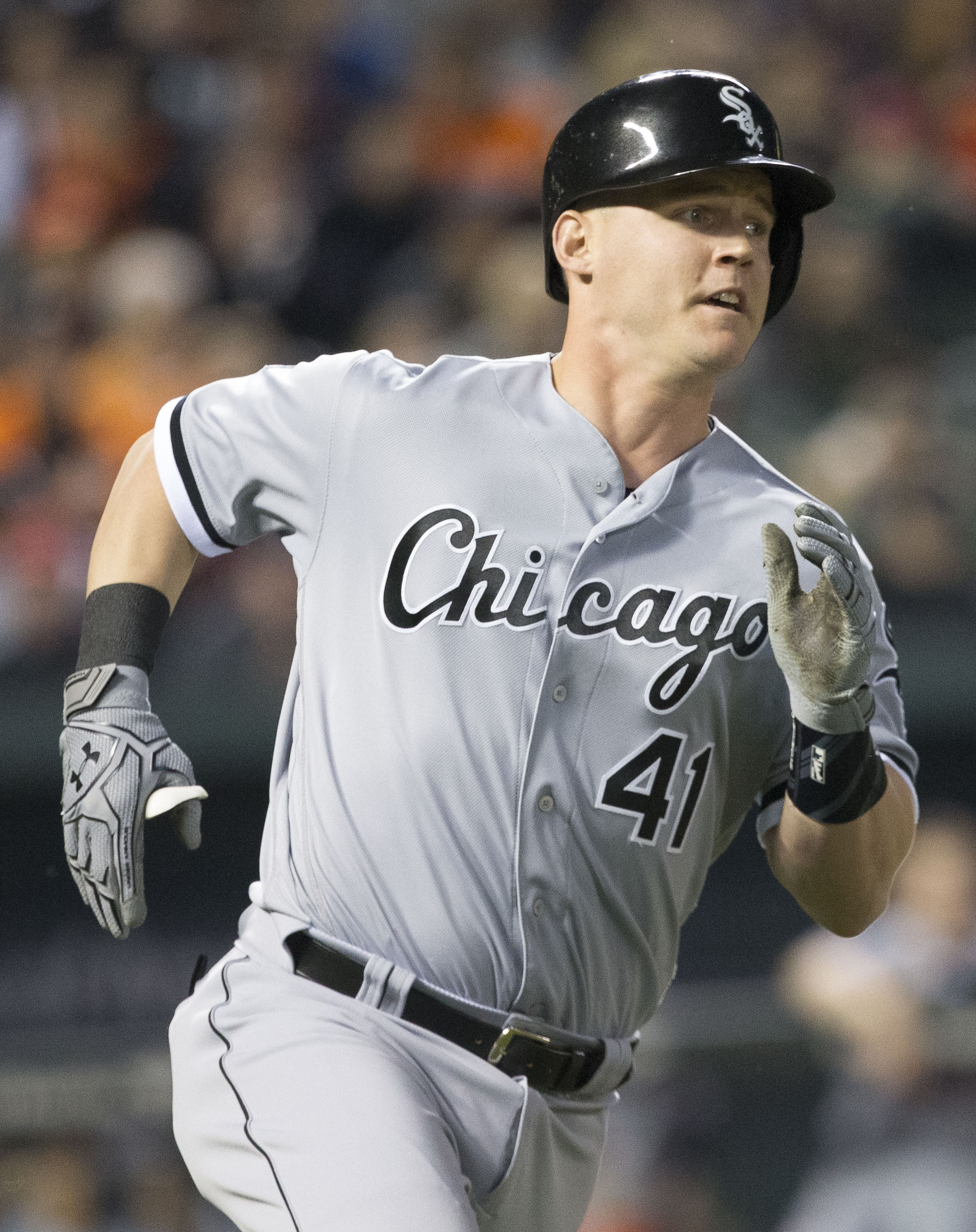
Sands with the Chicago White Sox

On December 23, 2015, the Chicago White Sox claimed Sands off waivers. He made 24 appearances for Chicago, batting .236/.276/.291 with one home run and seven RBI. On June 7, 2026, Sands was designated for assignment by the White Sox. He cleared waivers and was sent outright to the Triple-A Charlotte Knights on June 17.

=== Somerset Patriots ===
On February 13, 2017, Sands signed with the Somerset Patriots of the Atlantic League of Professional Baseball. Sands played in 39 contests for the Patriots, slashing .319/.387/.688 with 13 home runs and 45 RBI.

=== San Francisco Giants ===
On June 3, 2017, Sands signed a minor league contract with the San Francisco Giants organization. He made 64 appearances down the stretch for the Double-A Richmond Flying Squirrels, hitting .298/.402/.484 with five home runs, 28 RBI, and three stolen bases.

On July 9, 2018, while playing for Richmond in the Double–A Eastern League, Sands was named the league's player of the week. He made 100 appearances split between Richmond and the Triple-A Sacramento River Cats, batting a cumulative .269/.361/.505 with 16 home runs and 46 RBI.

=== Kiwoom Heroes ===
On August 7, 2018, Sands signed with the Nexen Heroes of the KBO League. In 2018, he hit .314 with 12 home runs and 37 RBI in 25 games with the team.

On November 23, 2018, Sands re-signed with the team, now named the Kiwoom Heroes. Sands made 139 appearances for Kiwoom during the 2019 season, slashing .305/.396/.543 with 28 home runs and 113 RBI.

=== Hanshin Tigers ===
On December 20, 2019, Sands signed with the Hanshin Tigers of Nippon Professional Baseball (NPB). In 2020, he played in 110 games for the Tigers, hitting .257/.363/.451 with 19 home runs and 64 RBI. In 2021, Sands made 120 appearances for Hanshin, batting .248/.328/.451 with 20 home runs and 65 RBI.

== Post-playing career ==
On December 5, 2022, the Hanshin Tigers of Nippon Professional Baseball announced that Sands had been hired as an international scout.
