= 2015 Pittsburgh Pirates season =

Major League Baseball season

2015 Pittsburgh Pirates
- National League Wild Card winners
- League: National League
- Division: Central
- Ballpark: PNC Park
- City: Pittsburgh, Pennsylvania
- Record: 98–64 (.605)
- Divisional place: 2nd
- Owners: Bob Nutting
- General managers: Neal Huntington
- Managers: Clint Hurdle
- Television: Root Sports Pittsburgh
- Radio: KDKA-FM; Pittsburgh Pirates Radio Network (Steve Blass, Greg Brown, Tim Neverett, Bob Walk, John Wehner, Robbie Incmikoski, Dan Potash)
- Stats: ESPN.com; Baseball Reference

The 2015 Pittsburgh Pirates season was the franchise's 134th season overall, the 129th season as a member of National League, and 15th season at PNC Park.

The Pirates qualified for the postseason for the third time in a row, clinching an NL Wild Card spot. However, they lost in the NLWC Game at home for the second consecutive season, this time against their division rival Chicago Cubs. As of 2026, this is the most recent season that the Pirates have appeared in the postseason, the second longest active drought in MLB.

== Background ==
The regular season began with a loss at Great American Ball Park against the Cincinnati Reds on April 6 and ended with a win against the Reds at PNC Park on October 4. The Pirates finished the regular season with the second-best record in baseball, finishing in second place for the third consecutive year in the National League Central with 98 wins and 64 losses.

The team clinched its third consecutive playoff berth on September 23, finishing second in its division behind the St. Louis Cardinals. The Pirates secured one of two NL Wild Card spots, but lost to the Chicago Cubs in the NLWC Game on October 7, eliminating the team from 2015 postseason play.

Four members of the 2015 Pirates were selected to represent the National League in the All-Star Game, including pitcher A. J. Burnett for the first time in his career in his final major league season. In addition, one player was named NL Player of the Month: Andrew McCutchen in August, one was named NL Rookie of the Month: Jung-ho Kang in July, and one was named NL Pitcher of the Month: Gerrit Cole in April.

On October 2, the penultimate game of the regular season, the Pirates set a PNC Park season attendance record for the second consecutive year at 2,498,596, beating the record set in 2014 (2,442,564).

== Season standings ==
=== National League Central ===
NL Central
Team	W	L	Pct.	GB	Home	Road
St. Louis Cardinals	100	62	.617	—	55‍–‍26	45‍–‍36
Pittsburgh Pirates	98	64	.605	2	53‍–‍28	45‍–‍36
Chicago Cubs	97	65	.599	3	49‍–‍32	48‍–‍33
Milwaukee Brewers	68	94	.420	32	34‍–‍47	34‍–‍47
Cincinnati Reds	64	98	.395	36	34‍–‍47	30‍–‍51

=== National League playoff standings ===
Division leaders
Team	W	L	Pct.
St. Louis Cardinals	100	62	.617
Los Angeles Dodgers	92	70	.568
New York Mets	90	72	.556

Wild Card teams (Top 2 teams qualify for postseason)
Team	W	L	Pct.	GB
Pittsburgh Pirates	98	64	.605	+1
Chicago Cubs	97	65	.599	—
San Francisco Giants	84	78	.519	13
Washington Nationals	83	79	.512	14
Arizona Diamondbacks	79	83	.488	18
San Diego Padres	74	88	.457	23
Miami Marlins	71	91	.438	26
Milwaukee Brewers	68	94	.420	29
Colorado Rockies	68	94	.420	29
Atlanta Braves	67	95	.414	30
Cincinnati Reds	64	98	.395	33
Philadelphia Phillies	63	99	.389	34

=== Record vs. opponents ===
2015 National League record Source: MLB Standings Grid – 2015
Team	AZ	ATL	CHC	CIN	COL	LAD	MIA	MIL	NYM	PHI	PIT	SD	SF	STL	WSH	AL
Arizona	—	3–3	2–4	6–1	13–6	6–13	5–2	5–2	2–5	2–4	1–5	9–10	11–8	0–7	3–4	11–9
Atlanta	3–3	—	1–6	3–4	1–6	3–3	10–9	5–2	8–11	11–8	2–4	2–5	3–4	4–2	5–14	6–14
Chicago	4–2	6–1	—	13–6	4–2	3–4	3–3	14–5	7–0	2–5	11–8	3–3	5–2	8–11	4–3	10–10
Cincinnati	1–6	4–3	6–13	—	2–4	1–6	3–4	9–10	0–7	4–2	11–8	2–4	2–5	7–12	5–1	7–13
Colorado	6–13	6–1	2–4	4–2	—	8–11	2–5	5–1	0–7	5–2	1–6	7–12	11–8	3–4	3–3	5–15
Los Angeles	13–6	3–3	4–3	6–1	11–8	—	4–2	4–3	3–4	5–2	1–5	14–5	8–11	2–5	4–2	10–10
Miami	2–5	9–10	3–3	4–3	5–2	2–4	—	4–2	8–11	9–10	1–6	2–5	5–2	1–5	9–10	7–13
Milwaukee	2–5	2–5	5–14	10–9	1–5	3–4	2–4	—	3–3	7–0	10–9	5–2	1–5	6–13	3–4	8–12
New York	5–2	11–8	0–7	7–0	7–0	4–3	11–8	3–3	—	14–5	0–6	2–4	3–3	3–4	11–8	9–11
Philadelphia	4–2	8–11	5–2	2–4	2–5	2–5	10–9	0–7	5–14	—	2–5	5–1	1–5	2–5	7–12	8–12
Pittsburgh	5–1	4–2	8–11	8–11	6–1	5–1	6–1	9–10	6–0	5–2	—	5–2	6–1	9–10	3–4	13–7
San Diego	10–9	5–2	3–3	4–2	12–7	5–14	5–2	2–5	4–2	1–5	2–5	—	8–11	4–3	2–5	7–13
San Francisco	8–11	4–3	2–5	5–2	8–11	11–8	2–5	5–1	3–3	5–1	1–6	11–8	—	2–4	4–3	13–7
St. Louis	7–0	2–4	11–8	12–7	4–3	5–2	5–1	13–6	4–3	5–2	10–9	3–4	4–2	—	4–2	11–9
Washington	4–3	14–5	3–4	1–5	3–3	2–4	10–9	4–3	8–11	12–7	4–3	5–2	3–4	2–4	—	8–12

=== Detailed records ===
National League
Opponent	W	L	WP	RS	RA
NL East
Atlanta Braves	4	2	0.667	29	21
Miami Marlins	6	1	0.857	30	15
New York Mets	6	0	1.000	37	10
Philadelphia Phillies	5	2	0.714	21	15
Washington Nationals	3	4	0.429	23	37
Total	24	9	0.727	140	98
NL Central
Chicago Cubs	8	11	0.421	71	81
Cincinnati Reds	8	11	0.421	69	81
Milwaukee Brewers	9	10	0.474	81	79
Pittsburgh Pirates					
St. Louis Cardinals	9	10	0.474	79	76
Total	34	42	0.447	300	317
NL West
Arizona Diamondbacks	5	1	0.833	28	15
Colorado Rockies	6	1	0.857	42	28
Los Angeles Dodgers	5	1	0.833	33	26
San Diego Padres	5	2	0.714	29	25
San Francisco Giants	6	1	0.857	32	19
Total	27	6	0.818	164	113
American League
Chicago White Sox	4	0	1.000	20	4
Cleveland Indians	2	1	0.667	8	8
Detroit Tigers	4	2	0.667	27	18
Kansas City Royals	1	2	0.333	12	15
Minnesota Twins	2	2	0.500	26	23
Total	13	7	0.650	93	68
Season Total	98	64	0.605	697	596

Month	Games	Won	Lost	Win %	RS	RA
April	22	12	10	0.545	89	71
May	28	14	14	0.500	119	103
June	26	17	9	0.654	95	82
July	26	17	9	0.654	120	117
August	27	19	8	0.704	123	92
September	30	17	13	0.567	140	124
October	3	2	1	0.667	11	7
Total	162	98	64	0.605	697	596

	Games	Won	Lost	Win %	RS	RA
Home	81	53	28	0.654	343	281
Away	81	45	36	0.556	354	315
Total	162	98	64	0.605	697	596

== Regular season ==
=== April ===
- **April 8** – Offseason bidding acquisition Jung-ho Kang makes his MLB debut after nine years playing in the South Korean KBO League.
- **April 9** – The Pirates are swept by the Cincinnati Reds in the first series of the regular season.
- Gerrit Cole is named NL Pitcher of the Month for April.
- The Pirates finish the month with a win–loss record of 12–10, third in the NL Central at 3.5 games out of first.

=== May ===
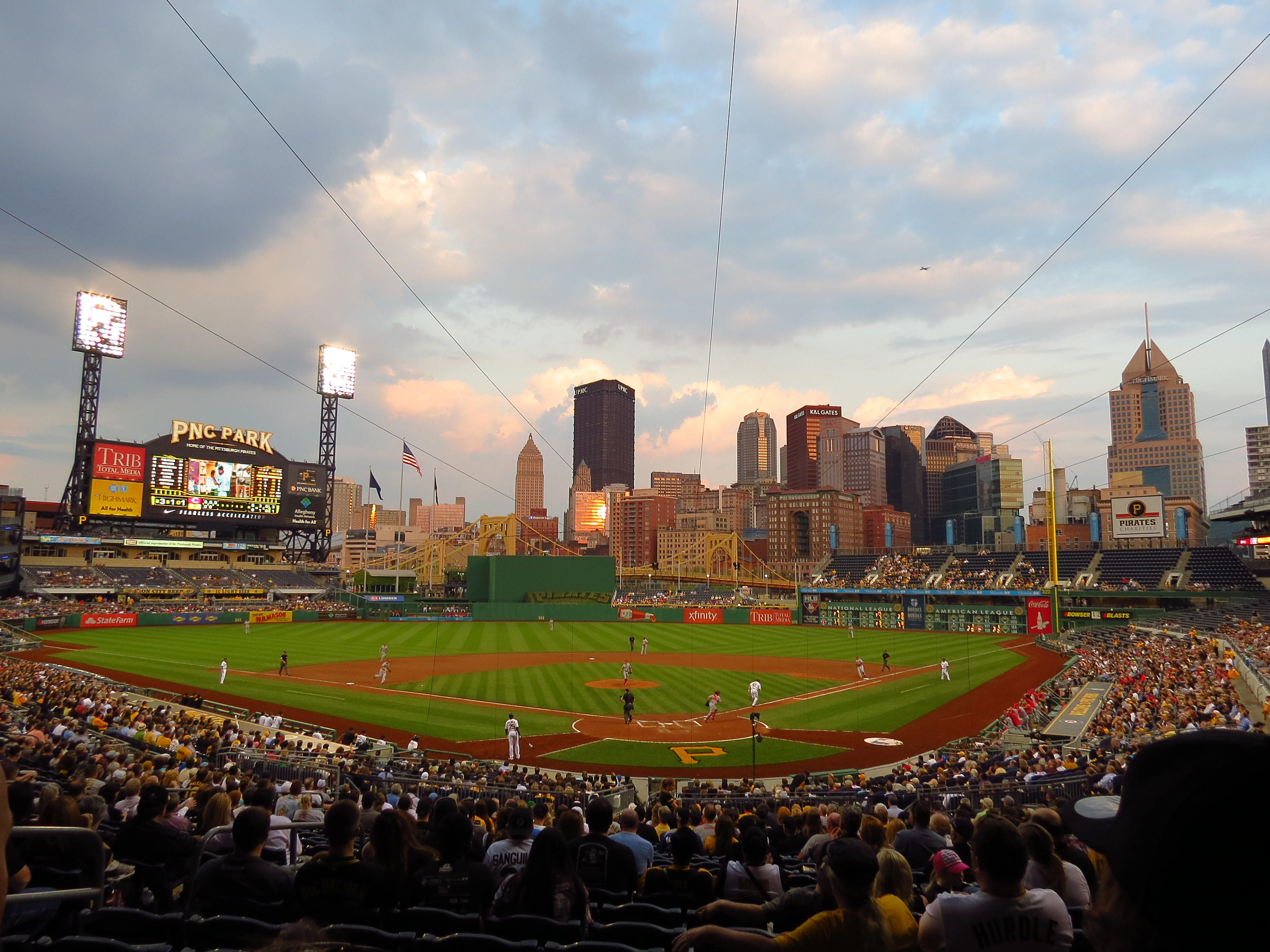
The Pirates play the Reds at PNC Park on May 6.

- **May 26** – Andrew McCutchen (OF) is named NL Player of the Week for the week ending May 24.
- The Pirates finish the month with a win–loss record of 26–24, third in the NL Central at 7.0 games out of first.

=== June ===
- **June 12** – Clint Hurdle earns his 900th career win as a manager in a Pirates victory at home over the Philadelphia Phillies.
- **June 20** – The Pirates are no-hit by Max Scherzer of the Washington Nationals, but a perfect game was broken up when Scherzer hit José Tábata in the elbow.
- The Pirates finish the month with a win–loss record of 43–33, second in the NL Central at 8.0 games out of first.

=== July ===
- **July 6** – A. J. Burnett (P), Gerrit Cole (P), Andrew McCutchen (OF), and Mark Melancon (P) are named to the National League All-Star team.
- **July 12** – The Pirates enter the All-Star break with a win–loss record of 53–35, second in the NL Central and second-best in MLB.
- Jung-ho Kang is named NL Rookie of the Month for July.
- The Pirates finish the month with a win–loss record of 60–42, second in the NL Central at 5.5 games out of first.

=== August ===
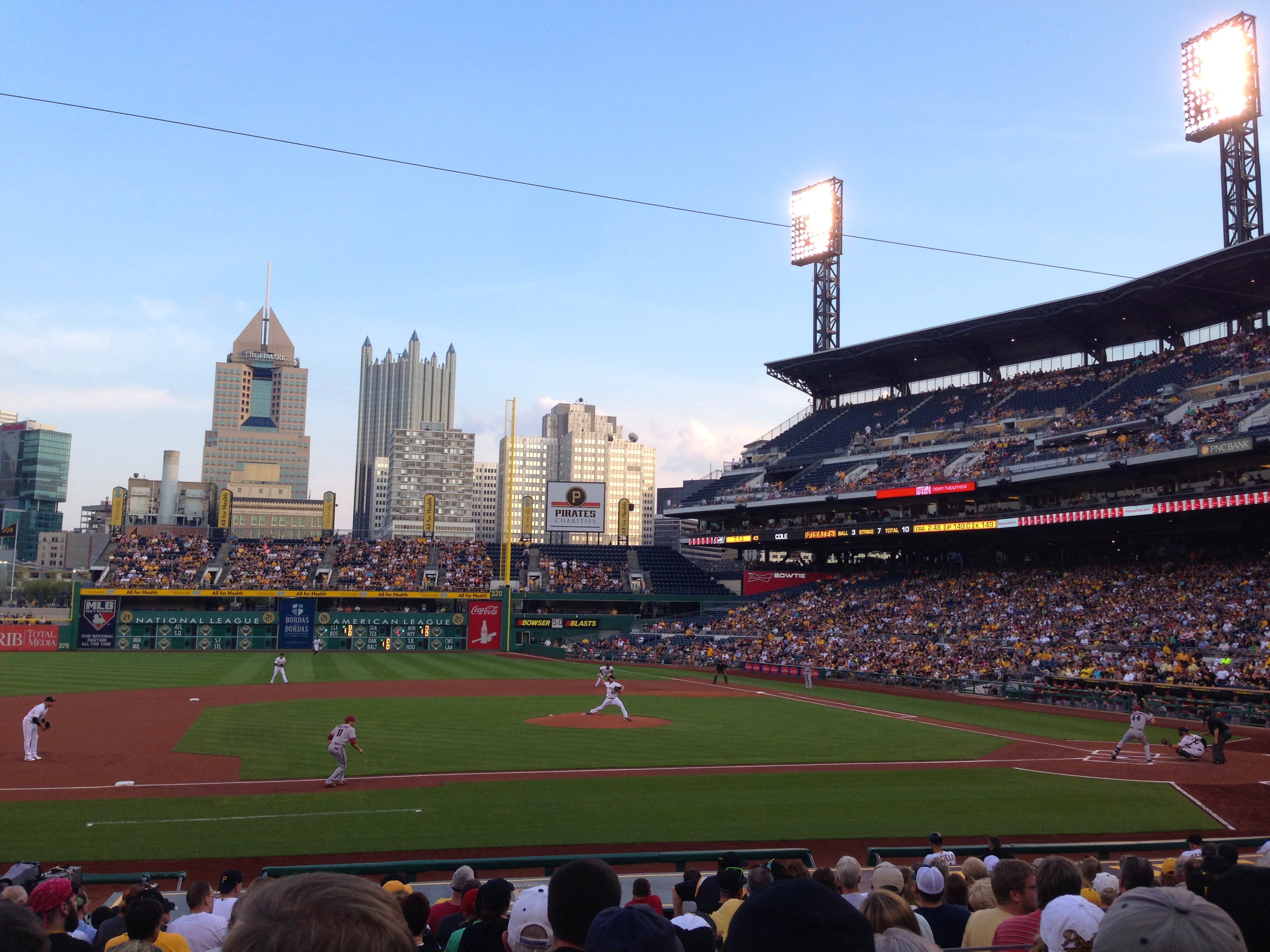
The Pirates host the Diamondbacks on August 17.

- **August 10** – Andrew McCutchen is named NL Player of the Week for the second time in 2015 for the week ending August 9.
- Andrew McCutchen is named NL Player of the Month for August.
- The Pirates finish the month with a win–loss record of 79–50, second in the NL Central at 5.0 games out of first.

=== September ===
- **September 20** – Mark Melancon records his 47th save of the season, breaking the all-time Pirates franchise record set by Mike Williams in 2002.
- **September 23** – The Pirates clinch their third consecutive playoff berth with an away win against the Colorado Rockies.
- **September 24** – The Pirates achieve a come-from-behind win against the Rockies on the strength of an 8th inning Pedro Alvarez three-run home run, earning the franchise's 10,000th win since joining the National League in 1887.
- **September 26** – The Pirates earn their 95th win of the season, ensuring their best season-end win–loss record since 1992.
- **September 30** – The Cardinals clinch the division, ensuring the Pirates' third consecutive appearance in the NL Wild Card game.

=== October ===
- **October 2** – During the final homestand of 2015, the Pirates set a new PNC Park attendance record for the second consecutive year at 2,498,596, a 56,032 increase over 2014.
- **October 4** – At the conclusion of the season, the Pirates had a win–loss record of 98–64, finishing second in the NL Central behind the St. Louis Cardinals with the second-best record in Major League Baseball. The Pirates clinched home-field advantage for the NL Wild Card game on the last day of the season, finishing one game ahead of the Chicago Cubs, whom they would face in the play-in game.

=== Game log ===
2015 Game Log: 98–64 (Home: 53–28; Away: 45–36)
April: 12–10 (Home: 6–4; Away: 6–6)

#	Date	Opponent	Score	Win	Loss	Save	Attendance	Record
1	April 6	@ Reds	2–5	Diaz (1–0)	**Watson** (0–1)	Chapman (1)	43,633	0–1
2	April 8	@ Reds	4–5 (11)	Hoover (1–0)	**Liz** (0–1)	—	30,859	0–2
3	April 9	@ Reds	2–3	Chapman (1–0)	**Scahill** (0–1)	—	15,616	0–3
4	April 10	@ Brewers	6–2	**Locke** (1–0)	Fiers (0–1)	—	27,373	1–3
5	April 11	@ Brewers	0–6	Nelson (1–0)	**Worley** (0–1)	—	41,108	1–4
6	April 12	@ Brewers	10–2	**Sadler** (1–0)	Lohse (0–2)	—	39,017	2–4
7	April 13	Tigers	5–4	**Cole** (1–0)	Sánchez (1–1)	—	39,933	3–4
8	April 14	Tigers	0–2	Greene (2–0)	**Burnett** (0–1)	Soria (3)	31,755	3–5
9	April 15	Tigers	0–1	Simón (2–0)	**Liriano** (0–1)	Soria (4)	19,509	3–6
10	April 17	Brewers	6–3	**Worley** (1–1)	Nelson (1–1)	**Melancon** (1)	25,664	4–6
11	April 18	Brewers	6–2	**Locke** (2–0)	Lohse (0–3)	—	33,961	5–6
12	April 19	Brewers	5–2	**Cole** (2–0)	Garza (1–2)	**Melancon** (2)	28,129	6–6
13	April 20	Cubs	2–5	Arrieta (2–1)	**Caminero** (0–1)	—	11,777	6–7
14	April 21	Cubs	8–9	Jackson (1–0)	**Melancon** (0–1)	Rondon (3)	13,680	6–8
15	April 22	Cubs	4–3	**Worley** (2–1)	Hammel (1–1)	**Watson** (1)	15,101	7–8
16	April 23	Cubs	5–4	**Liz** (1–1)	Schlitter (0–2)	**Melancon** (3)	22,224	8–8
17	April 24	@ Diamondbacks	4–1	**Cole** (3–0)	Collmenter (1–3)	**Melancon** (4)	24,427	9–8
18	April 25	@ Diamondbacks	2–1	**Watson** (1–1)	Reed (0–1)	**Melancon** (5)	38,859	10–8
19	April 26	@ Diamondbacks	8–0	**Liriano** (1–1)	Hellickson (1–3)	—	32,353	11–8
20	April 27	@ Cubs	0–4	Hammel (2–1)	**Worley** (2–2)	—	29,159	11–9
21	April 28	@ Cubs	2–6	Wood (2–1)	**Locke** (2–1)	—	29,915	11–10
22	April 29	@ Cubs	8–1	**Cole** (4–0)	Hendricks (0–1)	—	30,634	12–10

May: 14–14 (Home: 9–5; Away: 5–9)

#	Date	Opponent	Score	Win	Loss	Save	Attendance	Record
23	May 1	@ Cardinals	1–2 (10)	Choate (1–0)	**Scahill** (0–2)	—	40,912	12–11
24	May 2	@ Cardinals	1–2 (11)	Villanueva (3–1)	**Hughes** (0–1)	—	45,095	12–12
25	May 3	@ Cardinals	2–3 (14)	Socolovich (1–0)	**Liz** (1–2)	—	44,382	12–13
26	May 5	Reds	1–7	Lorenzen (1–1)	**Locke** (2–2)	—	16,822	12–14
27	May 6	Reds	0–3	Leake (2–1)	**Cole** (4–1)	Chapman (6)	16,527	12–15
28	May 7	Reds	7–2	**Burnett** (1–1)	DeSclafani (2–3)	—	27,302	13–15
29	May 8	Cardinals	5–8	Wacha (5–0)	**Liriano** (1–2)	Rosenthal (11)	33,507	13–16
30	May 9	Cardinals	7–5	**Scahill** (1–2)	Martinez (3–1)	**Melancon** (6)	38,068	14–16
31	May 10	Cardinals	4–3	**Hughes** (1–1)	Harris (1–1)	**Melancon** (7)	34,036	15–16
32	May 11	@ Phillies	4–3	**Cole** (5–1)	Williams (2–3)	**Melancon** (8)	21,358	16–16
33	May 12	@ Phillies	7–2	**Burnett** (2–1)	O'Sullivan (0–2)	—	20,393	17–16
34	May 13	@ Phillies	2–3	Hamels (3–3)	**Liriano** (1–3)	Papelbon (7)	29,576	17–17
35	May 14	@ Phillies	2–4	Harang (4–3)	**Worley** (2–3)	Papelbon (8)	29,205	17–18
36	May 15	@ Cubs	10–11 (12)	Jackson (2–1)	**Liz** (1–3)	—	33,617	17–19
37	May 16	@ Cubs	1–4	Lester (4–2)	**Cole** (5–2)	Wood (1)	38,883	17–20
38	May 17	@ Cubs	3–0	**Burnett** (3–1)	Arrieta (4–4)	**Melancon** (9)	36,289	18–20
39	May 19	Twins	5–8	Nolasco (4–1)	**Liriano** (1–4)	Perkins (14)	22,357	18–21
40	May 20	Twins	3–4 (13)	Duensing (2–0)	**Bastardo** (0–1)	Perkins (15)	21,718	18–22
41	May 22	Mets	4–1	**Cole** (6–2)	Syndergaard (1–2)	**Melancon** (10)	33,337	19–22
42	May 23	Mets	8–2	**Burnett** (4–1)	Harvey (5–2)	—	39,385	20–22
43	May 24	Mets	9–1	**Liriano** (2–4)	Niese (3–5)	—	37,784	21–22
44	May 25	Marlins	4–2	**Morton** (1–0)	Phelps (2–2)	**Melancon** (11)	20,046	22–22
45	May 26	Marlins	5–1	**Locke** (3–2)	Urena (0–1)	—	20,806	23–22
46	May 27	Marlins	5–2	**Cole** (7–2)	Dyson (2–2)	**Melancon** (12)	33,238	24–22
47	May 28	@ Padres	11–5	**Burnett** (5–1)	Kennedy (2–5)	—	23,104	25–22
48	May 29	@ Padres	2–6	Kimbrel (1–1)	**Scahill** (1–3)	—	28,317	25–23
49	May 30	@ Padres	5–2	**Morton** (2–0)	Ross (2–5)	**Melancon** (13)	43,207	26–23
50	May 31	@ Padres	1–7	Despaigne (3–3)	**Locke** (3–3)	—	20,556	26–24

June: 17–9 (Home: 9–5; Away: 8–4)

#	Date	Opponent	Score	Win	Loss	Save	Attendance	Record
51	June 1	@ Giants	4–3	**Cole** (8–2)	Vogelsong (4–3)	**Melancon** (14)	41,546	27–24
52	June 2	@ Giants	7–4	**Burnett** (6–1)	Heston (5–4)	**Melancon** (15)	41,913	28–24
53	June 3	@ Giants	5–2	**Liriano** (3–4)	Hudson (3–5)	**Melancon** (16)	41,495	29–24
54	June 5	@ Braves	10–8	**Morton** (3–0)	Avilán (2–1)	**Melancon** (17)	27,508	30–24
55	June 6	@ Braves	4–5	Grilli (1–2)	**Worley** (2–4)	—	33,268	30–25
56	June 7	@ Braves	3–0	**Cole** (9–2)	Wood (4–3)	**Melancon** (18)	24,146	31–25
57	June 8	Brewers	0–2	Nelson (3–6)	**Burnett** (6–2)	Rodriguez (11)	18,016	31–26
58	June 9	Brewers	1–4	Jungmann (1–0)	**Liriano** (3–5)	Rodriguez (12)	20,672	31–27
59	June 10	Brewers	2–0	**Morton** (4–0)	Lohse (3–7)	**Melancon** (19)	26,269	32–27
60	June 12	Phillies	1–0 (13)	**Bastardo** (1–1)	McGowan (1–2)	—	33,749	33–27
61	June 13	Phillies	4–3	**Cole** (10–2)	O'Sullivan (1–5)	**Melancon** (20)	37,516	34–27
62	June 14	Phillies	1–0 (11)	**Bastardo** (2–1)	Papelbon (1–1)	—	34,518	35–27
63	June 15	White Sox	11–0	**Liriano** (4–5)	Rodon (2–1)	—	24,536	36–27
64	June 16	White Sox	3–0	**Morton** (5–0)	Quintana (3–7)	**Melancon** (21)	28,413	37–27
65	June 17	@ White Sox	3–2	**Locke** (4–3)	Danks (3–7)	**Melancon** (22)	19,194	38–27
66	June 18	@ White Sox	3–2	**Cole** (11–2)	Petricka (1–2)	**Melancon** (23)	21,296	39–27
67	June 19	@ Nationals	1–4	Ross (2–1)	**Burnett** (6–3)	Storen (20)	38,935	39–28
68	June 20	@ Nationals	0–6	Scherzer (8–5)	**Liriano** (4–6)	—	41,104	39–29
69	June 21	@ Nationals	2–9	Gonzalez (5–4)	**Morton** (5–1)	—	40,015	39–30
70	June 23	Reds	7–6	**Scahill** (2–3)	Villarreal (0–2)	**Melancon** (24)	26,949	40–30
71	June 24	Reds	2–5	Leake (5–4)	**Cole** (11–3)	Hoover (1)	37,659	40–31
72	June 25	Reds	4–5 (13)	Villarreal (1–2)	**Scahill** (2–4)	—	35,015	40–32
73	June 26	Braves	3–2 (10)	**Melancon** (1–1)	Grilli (2–3)	—	34,220	41–32
74	June 27	Braves	8–4	**Morton** (6–1)	Teherán (5–4)	—	36,417	42–32
75	June 28	Braves	1–2	Wood (5–5)	**Locke** (4–4)	Grilli (21)	36,082	42–33
76	June 30	@ Tigers	5–4 (14)	**Guerra** (1–0)	Gorzelanny (1–2)	—	33,899	43–33

July: 17–9 (Home: 11–3; Away: 6–6)

#	Date	Opponent	Score	Win	Loss	Save	Attendance	Record
77	July 1	@ Tigers	9–3	**Burnett** (7–3)	Simón (7–5)	—	31,351	44–33
78	July 2	@ Tigers	8–4	**Liriano** (5–6)	Ryan (1–2)	**Melancon** (25)	34,680	45–33
79	July 3	Indians	2–5	Bauer (7–5)	**Morton** (6–2)	Allen (16)	38,840	45–34
80	July 4	Indians	1–0	**Locke** (5–4)	Anderson (1–1)	**Melancon** (26)	37,928	46–34
81	July 5	Indians	5–3	**Cole** (12–3)	Salazar (7–4)	**Melancon** (27)	36,812	47–34
82	July 6	Padres	2–1	**Hughes** (2–1)	Maurer (5–2)	—	23,182	48–34
83	July 7	Padres	3–2	**Watson** (2–1)	Benoit (5–4)	**Melancon** (28)	21,887	49–34
84	July 8	Padres	5–2	**Guerra** (2–0)	Cashner (3–10)	**Bastardo** (1)	25,035	50–34
85	July 9	Cardinals	1–4	Martinez (10–3)	**Locke** (5–5)	Rosenthal (26)	35,183	50–35
86	July 10	Cardinals	5–2	**Cole** (13–3)	Lynn (6–5)	**Melancon** (29)	36,825	51–35
87	July 11	Cardinals	6–5 (14)	**Worley** (3–4)	Greenwood (0–1)	—	37,318	52–35
88	July 12	Cardinals	6–5 (10)	**Caminero** (1–1)	Rosenthal (1–2)	—	33,544	53–35
–	July 14	86th All-Star Game	National League vs. American League (Great American Ball Park, Cincinnati, Ohio)					
89	July 17	@ Brewers	1–4	Fiers (5–7)	**Morton** (6–3)	Rodriguez (20)	32,363	53–36
90	July 18	@ Brewers	5–8	Nelson (7–9)	**Worley** (3–5)	Rodriguez (21)	33,104	53–37
91	July 19	@ Brewers	1–6	Jungmann (5–1)	**Locke** (5–6)	—	33,835	53–38
92	July 20	@ Royals	10–7	**Burnett** (8–3)	Ventura (4–7)	**Melancon** (30)	38,169	54–38
93	July 21	@ Royals	1–3	Davis (6–1)	**Cole** (13–4)	Holland (21)	38,163	54–39
94	July 22	@ Royals	1–5	Vólquez (9–5)	**Morton** (6–4)	—	39,105	54–40
95	July 23	Nationals	7–3	**Liriano** (6–6)	Fister (3–6)	—	37,799	55–40
96	July 24	Nationals	7–5	**Worley** (4–5)	Solis (1–1)	**Melancon** (31)	38,371	56–40
97	July 25	Nationals	3–9	Gonzalez (8–4)	**Burnett** (8–4)	—	38,185	56–41
98	July 26	Nationals	3–1	**Cole** (14–4)	Ross (2–3)	**Melancon** (32)	37,597	57–41
99	July 28	@ Twins	8–7	**Melancon** (2–1)	Perkins (0–3)	—	30,795	58–41
100	July 29	@ Twins	10–4	**Liriano** (7–6)	Santana (2–1)	—	37,273	59–41
101	July 30	@ Reds	5–15	Holmberg (1–0)	**Burnett** (8–5)	—	35,715	59–42
102	July 31	@ Reds	5–4	**Locke** (6–6)	Lorenzen (3–6)	**Melancon** (33)	35,088	60–42

August: 19–8 (Home: 11–4; Away: 8–4)

#	Date	Opponent	Score	Win	Loss	Save	Attendance	Record
103	August 1	@ Reds	3–4	Iglesias (2–3)	**Cole** (14–5)	Chapman (22)	42,284	60–43
104	August 2	@ Reds	3–0	**Morton** (7–4)	Sampson (0–1)	**Soria** (24)	39,596	61–43
—	August 3	Cubs	PPD, RAIN; rescheduled for September 15					
105	August 4	Cubs	0–5	Arrieta (12–6)	**Happ** (4–7)	—	34,993	61–44
106	August 5	Cubs	7–5	**Bastardo** (3–1)	Wood (5–4)	**Melancon** (34)	35,759	62–44
107	August 7	Dodgers	5–4 (10)	**Bastardo** (4–1)	Johnson (2–4)	—	39,404	63–44
108	August 8	Dodgers	6–5	**Blanton** (3–2)	Latos (4–8)	**Melancon** (35)	38,981	64–44
109	August 9	Dodgers	13–6	**Caminero** (2–1)	Johnson (2–5)	—	37,094	65–44
110	August 11	@ Cardinals	3–4	Martinez (12–4)	**Locke** (6–7)	Rosenthal (34)	41,273	65–45
111	August 12	@ Cardinals	2–4	Wacha (14–4)	**Cole** (14–6)	Rosenthal (35)	41,493	65–46
112	August 13	@ Cardinals	10–5	**Liriano** (8–6)	Lynn (9–7)	—	41,501	66–46
113	August 14	@ Mets	3–2 (10)	**Caminero** (3–1)	Parnell (1–2)	**Melancon** (36)	38,495	67–46
114	August 15	@ Mets	5–3 (14)	**Blanton** (4–2)	Gilmartin (1–1)	**Melancon** (37)	38,878	68–46
115	August 16	@ Mets	8–1	**Caminero** (4–1)	Parnell (1–3)	—	40,250	69–46
116	August 17	Diamondbacks	1–4	Hellickson (9–8)	**Cole** (14–7)	Ziegler (21)	27,365	69–47
117	August 18	Diamondbacks	9–8 (15)	**Blanton** (5–2)	Hessler (0–1)	—	24,975	70–47
118	August 19	Diamondbacks	4–1	**Happ** (5–7)	Ray (3–9)	**Melancon** (38)	32,088	71–47
119	August 20	Giants	4–0	**Morton** (8–4)	Peavy (3–6)	—	36,671	72–47
120	August 21	Giants	4–6	Bumgarner (15–6)	**Locke** (6–8)	Casilla (30)	37,692	72–48
121	August 22	Giants	3–2	**Melancon** (3–1)	Kontos (2–2)	—	38,259	73–48
122	August 23	Giants	5–2	**Liriano** (9–6)	Vogelsong (9–9)	**Melancon** (39)	31,364	74–48
123	August 24	@ Marlins	5–2	**Happ** (6–7)	Koehler (8–12)	**Melancon** (40)	17,644	75–48
124	August 25	@ Marlins	2–5	Hand (4–3)	**Morton** (8–5)	Ramos (22)	17,371	75–49
125	August 26	@ Marlins	7–2	**Locke** (7–8)	Narveson (1–1)	—	16,560	76–49
126	August 27	@ Marlins	2–1	**Cole** (15–7)	Nicolino (2–2)	**Melancon** (41)	19,950	77–49
127	August 28	Rockies	5–3	**Watson** (3–1)	Oberg (3–3)	**Melancon** (42)	32,607	78–49
128	August 29	Rockies	4–3	**Happ** (7–7)	Rusin (4–7)	**Melancon** (43)	35,838	79–49
129	August 30	Rockies	0–5	de la Rosa (8–6)	**Morton** (8–6)	—	36,271	79–50

September: 17–13 (Home: 5–6; Away: 12–7)

#	Date	Opponent	Score	Win	Loss	Save	Attendance	Record
130	September 1	@ Brewers	4–7	Nelson (11–10)	**Cole** (15–8)	Rodríguez (32)	18,468	79–51
131	September 2	@ Brewers	4–9	Jeffress (4–0)	**Locke** (7–9)	—	24,521	79–52
132	September 3	@ Brewers	3–5	Jungmann (9–5)	**Liriano** (9–7)	Rodríguez (33)	22,242	79–53
133	September 4	@ Cardinals	9–3	**Happ** (8–7)	Martinez (13–7)	—	44,338	80–53
134	September 5	@ Cardinals	1–4	García (8–4)	**Morton** (8–7)	—	45,139	80–54
135	September 6	@ Cardinals	7–1	**Cole** (16–8)	Lackey (11–9)	—	46,011	81–54
136	September 7	@ Reds	1–3	DeSclafani (8–10)	**Locke** (7–10)	Chapman (29)	19,241	81–55
137	September 8	@ Reds	7–3	**Liriano** (10–7)	Iglesias (3–7)	—	16,151	82–55
138	September 9	@ Reds	5–4	**Happ** (9–7)	Sampson (2–4)	**Melancon** (44)	19,620	83–55
139	September 10	Brewers	4–6 (13)	Rodríguez (1–3)	**Liz** (1–4)	Lohse (2)	21,964	83–56
140	September 11	Brewers	6–3	**Morton** (9–7)	Nelson (11–12)	**Melancon** (45)	28,346	84–56
141	September 12	Brewers	10–2	**Locke** (8–10)	Davies (1–1)	—	35,749	85–56
142	September 13	Brewers	7–6 (11)	**Hughes** (3–1)	Thornburg (0–1)	—	34,740	86–56
143	September 15	Cubs	5–4	**Watson** (4–1)	Grimm (3–5)	**Melancon** (46)	31,488	87–56
144	September 15	Cubs	1–2	Lester (10–10)	**Happ** (9–8)	—	25,914	87–57
145	September 16	Cubs	2–3 (12)	Rondón (6–4)	**Worley** (4–6)	—	31,945	87–58
146	September 17	Cubs	6–9	Richard (4–2)	**Morton** (9–8)	Wood (2)	28,228	87–59
147	September 18	@ Dodgers	2–6	Greinke (18–3)	**Locke** (8–11)	—	49,529	87–60
148	September 19	@ Dodgers	3–2	**Liriano** (11–7)	Kershaw (14–7)	**Melancon** (47)	49,441	88–60
149	September 20	@ Dodgers	4–3	**Cole** (17–8)	Bolsinger (6–4)	**Melancon** (48)	47,483	89–60
150	September 21	@ Rockies	9–3	**Burnett** (9–5)	Gray (0–2)	—	23,187	90–60
151	September 22	@ Rockies	6–3	**Happ** (10–8)	Rusin (5–9)	**Melancon** (49)	23,433	91–60
152	September 23	@ Rockies	13–7	**Blanton** (6–2)	Bergman (3–1)	—	23,526	92–60
153	September 24	@ Rockies	5–4	**Blanton** (7–2)	Diaz (0–1)	**Melancon** (50)	25,163	93–60
154	September 25	@ Cubs	3–2	**Cole** (18–8)	Lester (10–12)	**Melancon** (51)	40,432	94–60
155	September 26	@ Cubs	4–0	**Liriano** (12–7)	Hammel (9–7)	—	41,150	95–60
156	September 27	@ Cubs	0–4	Arrieta (21–6)	**Burnett** (9–6)	—	40,617	95–61
157	September 28	Cardinals	0–3	Broxton (4–5)	**Melancon** (3–2)	Rosenthal (48)	30,198	95–62
—	September 29	Cardinals	PPD, RAIN; rescheduled for September 30					
158	September 30	Cardinals	8–2	**Cole** (19–8)	Wacha (17–7)	—	29,747	96–62
159	September 30	Cardinals	1–11	Lyons (3–1)	**Morton** (9–9)	—	34,729	96–63

October: 2–1 (Home: 2–1; Away: 0–0)

#	Date	Opponent	Score	Win	Loss	Save	Attendance	Record
160	October 2	Reds	6–4 (12)	**Caminero** (5–1)	Balester (1–1)	—	31,442	97–63
161	October 3	Reds	1–3	Finnegan (5–2)	**Burnett** (9–7)	Chapman (33)	34,180	97–64
162	October 4	Reds	4–0	**Happ** (11–8)	Smith (0–4)	—	35,362	98–64

Legend: = Win = Loss = Postponement
Bold = Pirates team member

== Postseason ==
=== Wild Card Game ===
- **October 7 – National League Wild Card game –** Chicago's Jake Arrieta pitched a complete game, striking out eleven batters and allowing only five hits. The Cubs were paced offensively by Dexter Fowler and Kyle Schwarber, both combining for five hits in seven at bats, each with a home run. Pittsburgh starter Gerrit Cole gave up two home runs in a game for the first time in the season. Cole lasted five innings, striking out four.

=== Game log ===
2015 Postseason Game Log (0–1)
2015 NL Wild Card Game: vs. Chicago Cubs (0–1)

#	Date	Opponent	Score	Win	Loss	Save	Attendance	Series
1	October 7	Cubs	0–4	Arrieta (1–0)	**Cole** (0–1)	—	40,889	0–1

Legend: = Win = Loss
Bold = Pirates team member

Playoff rosters
National League Wild Card Game

- Pitchers: 35 Mark Melancon 37 Arquimedes Caminero 38 Joakim Soria 44 Tony Watson 45 Gerrit Cole 47 Francisco Liriano 48 Jared Hughes 55 Joe Blanton 59 Antonio Bastardo
- Catchers: 19 Chris Stewart 29 Francisco Cervelli 66 Elías Díaz
- Infielders: 3 Sean Rodriguez 5 Josh Harrison 10 Jordy Mercer 17 Aramis Ramírez 18 Neil Walker 24 Pedro Álvarez 31 Michael Morse 51 Pedro Florimón
- Outfielders: 6 Starling Marte 22 Andrew McCutchen 23 Travis Snider 25 Gregory Polanco 60 Keon Broxton

== Roster ==
2015 Pittsburgh Pirates
Roster
Pitchers: 59 Antonio Bastardo; 55 Joe Blanton; 34 A. J. Burnett; 37 Arquimedes Caminero; 45 Gerrit Cole; 64 Deolis Guerra; 32 J. A. Happ; 48 Jared Hughes; 39 Bobby LaFromboise; 47 Francisco Liriano; 58 Radhames Liz; 49 Jeff Locke; 35 Mark Melancon; 50 Charlie Morton; 65 Casey Sadler; 52 Rob Scahill; 38 Joakim Soria; 38 Chris Volstad; 44 Tony Watson; 46 Vance Worley	Catchers: 29 Francisco Cervelli; 66 Elías Díaz; 26 Tony Sanchez; 19 Chris Stewart; Infielders: 24 Pedro Alvarez; 17,23,51 Pedro Florimón; 5 Josh Harrison; 12 Corey Hart; 30 Travis Ishikawa; 27 Jung-ho Kang; 23 Steve Lombardozzi Jr.; 10 Jordy Mercer; 53 Brent Morel; 31 Mike Morse; 17 Aramis Ramírez; 3 Sean Rodriguez; 18 Neil Walker	Outfielders: 60 Keon Broxton; 14 Jaff Decker; 51 Gorkys Hernández; 15 Andrew Lambo; 6 Starling Marté; 22 Andrew McCutchen; 25 Gregory Polanco; 23 Travis Snider; 31 José Tábata	Manager: 13 Clint Hurdle; Coaches: 86 Heberto Andrade (bullpen catcher); 36 Brad Fischer (bench coach); 2 Jeff Branson (hitting); 85 Dave Jauss (coach); 7 Frank Kremblas (special assistant); 16 Nick Leyva (first base); 75 Jeff Livesey (assistant hitting); 56 Euclides Rojas (bullpen); 54 Ray Searage (pitching); 41 Rick Sofield (third base)

=== Opening Day lineup ===
Opening Day Starters
Name	Position
Josh Harrison	3B
Gregory Polanco	RF
Andrew McCutchen	CF
Neil Walker	2B
Starling Marte	LF
Pedro Álvarez	1B
Francisco Cervelli	C
Jordy Mercer	SS
Francisco Liriano	SP

=== Disabled lists ===
==== 15-day disabled list ====
Player	Injury	Placed	Activated
Brandon Cumpton	Tommy John surgery recovery	March 27, 2015	May 16, 2015
Chris Stewart	Right hamstring	March 27, 2015	April 17, 2015
Justin Sellers	Left heel	March 27, 2015	May 19, 2015
Jaff Decker	Left calf strain	March 30, 2015	April 18, 2015
Charlie Morton	Right hip	April 5, 2015	May 25, 2015
Andrew Lambo	Plantar fasciitis in his left foot	May 4, 2015	June 26, 2015
Corey Hart	Left Shoulder Impingement	June 24, 2015	July 20, 2015
Rob Scahill	Right forearm tightness	June 26, 2015	September 1, 2015
Josh Harrison	Left thumb injury	July 6, 2015	August 21, 2015
Gorkys Hernández	Left shoulder discomfort	July 13, 2015	July 30, 2015
Jordy Mercer	Left knee MCL sprain	July 20, 2015	August 23, 2015
A. J. Burnett	Right elbow inflammation	July 31, 2015	September 10, 2015
Deolis Guerra	Left knee inflammation	August 7, 2015	September 2, 2015
Travis Ishikawa	Lower back strain	August 20, 2015	September 7, 2015

==== 60-day disabled list ====
Player	Injury	Placed	Activated
Brandon Cumpton	Tommy John surgery recovery	May 16, 2015	October 8, 2015
Justin Sellers	Left heel	May 19, 2015	July 30, 2015
Andrew Lambo	Plantar fasciitis in his left foot	June 26, 2015	October 8, 2015
Corey Hart	Left shoulder impingement	July 20, 2015	October 8, 2015
Casey Sadler	Right forearm strain	September 1, 2015	October 8, 2015
Deolis Guerra	Left knee inflammation	September 2, 2015	October 8, 2015
Jung-ho Kang	Torn lateral meniscus/fractured tibia (left)	September 21, 2015	October 8, 2015

== Notable achievements ==
=== Awards ===
2015 Baseball America Organization of the Year

2015 National League Saves Leader

- Mark Melancon

2015 Roberto Clemente Award

- Andrew McCutchen

2015 Trevor Hoffman Award

- Mark Melancon

Silver Slugger Award

- Andrew McCutchen

Wilson Defensive Player of the Year Award

- Starling Marte (LF)

2015 Major League Baseball All-Star Game

- A. J. Burnett, P, reserve
- Gerrit Cole, P, reserve
- Andrew McCutchen, OF, reserve (starting in place of Giancarlo Stanton)
- Mark Melancon, P, reserve

NL Pitcher of the Month

- Gerrit Cole (April)

NL Rookie of the Month

- Jung-ho Kang (July)

NL Player of the Week

- Andrew McCutchen (May 18–24)
- Andrew McCutchen (August 3–9)

NL Player of the Month

- Andrew McCutchen (August)

Esurance MLB Awards
Award	Player	Result
MLB Best Major Leaguer	Andrew McCutchen	Nominated
MLB Best Everyday Player	Andrew McCutchen	Nominated
MLB Best Starting Pitcher	Gerrit Cole	Nominated
MLB Best Rookie	Jung-ho Kang	Nominated

=== Milestones ===
Regular season
Player	Milestone	Reached
J. Kang	1st Career MLB Game	April 8, 2015
J. Kang	1st Career MLB Hit	April 12, 2015
C. Hart	1,000th Career MLB Hit	April 13, 2015
J. Kang	1st Career MLB RBI	April 21, 2015
M. Melancon	300th Career MLB Game	April 24, 2015
F. Liriano	200th Career MLB Game Started	April 26, 2015
A. McCutchen	1,000th Career MLB Hit	April 29, 2015
P. Álvarez	500th Career MLB Hit	May 2, 2015
J. Kang	1st Career MLB Home Run	May 3, 2015
A. Burnett	2,400th Career MLB Strike Out	May 7, 2015
P. Álvarez	100th Career MLB Double	June 9, 2015
J. Hughes	200th Career MLB Game	June 9, 2015
A. McCutchen	500th Career MLB RBI	June 13, 2015
J. Tábata	500th Career MLB Game	June 14, 2015
A. Bastardo	300th Career MLB Game	June 25, 2015
V. Worley	500th Career MLB Inning Pitched	July 11, 2015
S. Marte	100th Career MLB Stolen Base	July 17, 2015
V. Worley	100th Career MLB Game	July 18, 2015
T. Watson	300th Career MLB Game	July 20, 2015
M. Melancon	100th Career MLB Save	July 20, 2015
A. McCutchen	500th Career MLB Walk	August 5, 2015
J. Kang	100th Career MLB Game	August 18, 2015
A. Ramirez	1,400th Career MLB RBI	August 21, 2015
J. Kang	100th Career MLB Hit	August 22, 2015
A. McCutchen	1,000th Career MLB Game	August 24, 2015

== Statistics ==
=== Players ===
Final stats for 2015

Batting

Note: G = Games played; AB = At bats; H = Hits; Avg. = Batting average; HR = Home runs; RBI = Runs batted in

Regular season
Player	G	AB	H	Avg.	HR	RBI
T. Sanchez	3	8	3	0.375	0	0
**F. Cervelli**	130	451	133	0.295	7	43
**A. McCutchen**	157	566	165	0.292	23	96
J. Tábata^{‡}	27	38	11	0.289	0	4
C. Stewart	58	159	46	0.289	0	15
J. Kang	126	421	121	0.287	15	58
J. Harrison	114	418	120	0.287	4	28
**S. Marte**	153	579	166	0.287	19	81
B. Morel^{‡}	3	7	2	0.286	0	1
M. Morse^{†}	45	69	19	0.275	1	7
**N. Walker**	151	543	146	0.269	16	71
**G. Polanco**	153	593	152	0.256	9	52
S. Rodriguez	139	224	55	0.246	4	17
A. Ramírez^{†}	56	196	48	0.245	6	33
J. Mercer	116	394	96	0.244	3	34
P. Álvarez	150	437	106	0.243	27	77
T. Ishikawa^{†}	38	58	13	0.224	1	8
C. Hart	35	54	12	0.222	2	9
J. Decker	23	28	6	0.214	0	1
T. Snider^{†}	18	26	5	0.192	1	8
V. Worley	23	17	3	0.176	0	0
F. Liriano	29	65	11	0.169	1	7
G. Cole	30	60	9	0.150	0	2
A. Burnett	24	42	5	0.119	1	5
J. Happ^{†}	11	22	2	0.091	0	0
P. Florimón	24	23	2	0.087	0	1
J. Locke	29	45	3	0.067	0	2
A. Lambo	20	25	1	0.040	0	0
C. Morton	21	36	1	0.028	0	1
A. Bastardo	61	2	0	0.000	0	0
J. Blanton^{†}	21	3	0	0.000	0	0
K. Broxton	7	2	0	0.000	0	0
E. Diaz	2	2	0	0.000	0	0
D. Guerra	8	1	0	0.000	0	0
G. Hernández	8	5	0	0.000	0	0
R. Liz	14	1	0	0.000	0	0
S. Lombardozzi	12	10	0	0.000	0	0
C. Sadler	1	1	0	0.000	0	0
A. Caminero	67	0	0	—	0	0
J. Hughes	71	0	0	—	0	0
B. LaFromboise	11	0	0	—	0	0
M. Melancon	72	0	0	—	0	0
R. Scahill	28	0	0	—	0	0
J. Soria^{†}	29	0	0	—	0	0
C. Volstad	1	0	0	—	0	0
T. Watson	72	0	0	—	0	0
**Team totals**	**162**	**5,631**	**1,462**	**0.260**	**140**	**661**

Postseason
Player	G	AB	H	Avg.	HR	RBI
M. Morse	1	1	1	1.000	0	0
T. Snider	1	1	1	1.000	0	0
A. McCutchen	1	4	2	0.500	0	0
F. Cervelli	1	3	1	0.333	0	0
P. Álvarez	1	3	0	0.000	0	0
G. Cole	1	1	0	0.000	0	0
J. Harrison	1	3	0	0.000	0	0
S. Marte	1	4	0	0.000	0	0
J. Mercer	1	2	0	0.000	0	0
G. Polanco	1	4	0	0.000	0	0
A. Ramírez	1	1	0	0.000	0	0
N. Walker	1	3	0	0.000	0	0
A. Bastardo	1	0	0	—	0	0
M. Melancon	1	0	0	—	0	0
S. Rodriguez	1	0	0	—	0	0
J. Soria	1	0	0	—	0	0
T. Watson	1	0	0	—	0	0
**Team totals**	**1**	**30**	**5**	**0.167**	**0**	**0**

Pitching

Note: G = Games pitched; IP = Innings pitched; W = Wins; L = Losses; ERA = Earned run average; SO = Strikeouts

Regular season
Player	G	IP	W	L	ERA	SO
J. Decker	1	1	0	0	0.00	0
C. Volstad	1	2	0	0	0.00	0
B. LaFromboise	11	8	0	0	1.13	8
J. Blanton^{†}	21	34 1/3	5	0	1.57	39
J. Happ^{†}	11	63 1/3	7	2	1.85	69
T. Watson	77	75 1/3	4	1	1.91	62
J. Soria^{†}	29	26 2/3	0	0	2.03	28
M. Melancon	78	76 2/3	3	2	2.23	62
J. Hughes	76	67	3	1	2.28	36
**G. Cole**	32	208	19	8	2.60	202
R. Scahill	28	30 2/3	2	4	2.64	24
A. Bastardo	66	57 1/3	4	1	2.98	64
**A. Burnett**	26	164	9	7	3.18	143
**F. Liriano**	31	186 2/3	12	7	3.38	205
C. Sadler	1	5	1	0	3.60	5
A. Caminero	73	74 2/3	5	1	3.62	73
V. Worley	23	71 2/3	4	6	4.02	49
R. Liz	14	23 1/3	1	4	4.24	27
**J. Locke**	30	168 1/3	8	11	4.49	129
C. Morton	23	129	9	9	4.81	96
D. Guerra	10	16 2/3	2	0	6.48	17
**Team totals**	**162**	**1,489 2/3**	**98**	**64**	**3.21**	**1,338**

Postseason
Player	G	IP	W	L	ERA	SO
A. Bastardo	1	1	0	0	0.00	2
M. Melancon	1	1	0	0	0.00	0
J. Soria	1	1	0	0	0.00	3
T. Watson	1	1	0	0	0.00	1
G. Cole	1	5	0	1	7.20	4
**Team totals**	**1**	**9**	**0**	**1**	**4.00**	**10**

Legend

– Stats reflect time with the Pirates only.
^{†} – Denotes player was acquired during season.
^{‡} – Denotes player was relinquished during season.
– Injured reserve.
Bold – Qualified for batting title (3.1 plate appearances per team game) or ERA title (1 inning pitched per team game)

== Transactions ==
The Pirates were involved in the following transactions during the 2015 season:

- Black line marks the transition between off season and regular season

=== Trades ===
November 11, 2014	To Colorado Rockies: Shane Carle	To Pittsburgh Pirates: Rob Scahill
November 12, 2014	To New York Yankees: Justin Wilson	To Pittsburgh Pirates: Francisco Cervelli
November 23, 2014	To Oakland A's: Ike Davis	To Pittsburgh Pirates: International Signing Bonus Money
December 1, 2014	To Tampa Bay Rays: PTBNL or Cash Considerations^{[Note 1]}	To Pittsburgh Pirates: Sean Rodriguez
December 10, 2014	To Philadelphia Phillies: Joely Rodriguez	To Pittsburgh Pirates: Antonio Bastardo
January 27, 2015	To Baltimore Orioles: Travis Snider	To Pittsburgh Pirates: Stephen Tarpley; PTBNL^{[Note 2]}
February 3, 2015	To Baltimore Orioles: Cash Considerations	To Pittsburgh Pirates: Steve Lombardozzi Jr.
February 4, 2015	To Miami Marlins: Cash Considerations	To Pittsburgh Pirates: Arquimedes Caminero
February 5, 2015	To Atlanta Braves: Bryton Trepagnier	To Pittsburgh Pirates: Edward Salcedo
April 2, 2015	To Milwaukee Brewers: PTBNL	To Pittsburgh Pirates: Hunter Morris
May 10, 2015	To Toronto Blue Jays: Cash Considerations	To Pittsburgh Pirates: Jayson Aquino
July 3, 2015	To Chicago Cubs: Clayton Richard	To Pittsburgh Pirates: Cash Considerations
July 23, 2015	To Milwaukee Brewers: Yhonathan Barrios	To Pittsburgh Pirates: Aramis Ramírez; Cash Considerations
July 29, 2015	To Cleveland Indians: Jayson Aquino	To Pittsburgh Pirates: Cash Considerations
July 29, 2015	To Kansas City Royals: Cash Considerations	To Pittsburgh Pirates: Joe Blanton
July 30, 2015	To Chicago White Sox: Justin Sellers	To Pittsburgh Pirates: Cash Considerations or PTBNL
July 30, 2015	To Detroit Tigers: JaCoby Jones	To Pittsburgh Pirates: Joakim Soria
July 31, 2015	To Seattle Mariners: Adrian Sampson	To Pittsburgh Pirates: J. A. Happ
July 31, 2015	To Los Angeles Dodgers: José Tábata	To Pittsburgh Pirates: Michael Morse; Cash Considerations

Notes

- ^{1} – Buddy Borden fulfilled on December 12, 2014.
- ^{2} – Steven Brault fulfilled on February 20, 2015.

=== Free agents ===
Player	Acquired from	Lost to	Date	Contract terms
Dean Anna		St. Louis Cardinals	November 11, 2014	1 year
A. J. Burnett	Philadelphia Phillies		November 14, 2014	1 year/$8.5 million
Russell Martin		Toronto Blue Jays	November 17, 2014	5 year/$82 million
Blake Wood		Kansas City Royals	November 17, 2014	Minor league contract^{[A]}
Brad Lincoln		Philadelphia Phillies	November 17, 2014	Minor league contract^{[A]}
Deolis Guerra		Minnesota Twins	November 17, 2014	Minor league contract^{[A]}
Gustavo Nunez		Atlanta Braves	November 17, 2014	Minor league contract^{[A]}
Jeremy Bleich		New York Yankees	November 17, 2014	Minor league contract^{[A]}
Radhames Liz	Toronto Blue Jays		November 19, 2014	Minor league contract
Jacob Brigham		Atlanta Braves	November 20, 2014	Minor league contract
Sebastian Valle	Philadelphia Phillies		November 20, 2014	Minor league contract^{[A]}
Ernesto Frieri		Tampa Bay Rays	November 26, 2014	1 year/$800,000
Deibinson Romero	Minnesota Twins		December 1, 2014	Minor league contract^{[A]}
Gorkys Hernández	Chicago White Sox		December 1, 2014	Minor league contract^{[A]}
Wirfin Obispo		Milwaukee Brewers	December 2, 2014	Minor league contract
Clayton Richard	Arizona Diamondbacks		December 3, 2014	Minor league contract^{[A]}
Clint Barmes		San Diego Padres	December 4, 2014	1 year/$1.6 million
Thomas Field		Texas Rangers	December 16, 2014	Minor league contract^{[A]}
Edinson Vólquez		Kansas City Royals	December 17, 2014	2 year
Corey Hart	Seattle Mariners		December 19, 2014	1 year/$2.5 million
Adam Wilk		Los Angeles Angels of Anaheim	December 23, 2014	Minor league contract^{[A]}
Omir Santos		Washington Nationals	December 29, 2014	Minor league contract
Nevin Ashley		Milwaukee Brewers	January 5, 2015	Minor league contract^{[A]}
Charlie Leesman	Chicago White Sox		January 9, 2015	Minor league contract^{[A]}
Wilfredo Boscán	Boston Red Sox		January 9, 2015	Minor league contract^{[A]}
Josh Stinson		Kia Tigers (KBO League)	January 11, 2015	1 year
Jeanmar Gómez		Philadelphia Phillies	January 12, 2015	Minor league contract^{[A]}
Jarek Cunningham		Los Angeles Dodgers	January 23, 2015	Minor league contract
Chris Volstad	Los Angeles Angels of Anaheim		January 28, 2015	Minor league contract^{[A]}
Wilkin Castillo	Los Angeles Dodgers		January 28, 2015	Minor league contract^{[A]}
John Axford		Colorado Rockies	February 2, 2015	Minor league contract^{[A]}
Rafael Perez		Seattle Mariners	February 2, 2015	Minor league contract^{[A]}
Jake Elmore		Tampa Bay Rays	February 9, 2015	Minor league contract^{[A]}
Frank Herrmann	Los Angeles Angels of Anaheim		August 16, 2015	Minor league contract
Travis Snider	Baltimore Orioles		August 20, 2015	Minor league contract

=== Waivers ===
Player	Claimed from	Lost to	Date
Jake Elmore	Cincinnati Reds		November 7, 2014
Pedro Florimón	Washington Nationals		November 20, 2014
Josh Lindblom	Oakland Athletics		December 8, 2014
Preston Guilmet		Toronto Blue Jays	December 23, 2014
Stolmy Pimentel		Texas Rangers	April 11, 2015
Travis Ishikawa	San Francisco Giants		July 5, 2015

=== Signings ===
Player	Date	Contract terms
Felipe González	November 18, 2014	Minor league contract
Junior Sosa	November 18, 2014	Minor league contract
Marek Minárik	November 18, 2014	Minor league contract
Tyler Sample	November 18, 2014	Minor league contract
Miguel Pérez	November 20, 2014	Minor league contract
Francisco Diaz	December 4, 2014	Minor league contract
Francisco Liriano	December 10, 2014	3 year/$39 million
Radhames Liz	December 12, 2014	1 year
Adrian Sampson	January 9, 2015	Minor league contract^{[A]}
Gift Ngoepe	January 9, 2015	Minor league contract^{[A]}
Keon Broxton	January 9, 2015	Minor league contract^{[A]}
Mel Rojas Jr.	January 9, 2015	Minor league contract^{[A]}
Stetson Allie	January 9, 2015	Minor league contract^{[A]}
Tyler Glasnow	January 9, 2015	Minor league contract^{[A]}
Antonio Bastardo	January 16, 2015	1 year/$3.1 million
Chris Stewart	January 16, 2015	1 year/$1.2 million
Francisco Cervelli	January 16, 2015	1 year/$987,000
Josh Harrison	January 16, 2015	1 year/$2.8 million
Jung-ho Kang	January 16, 2015	4 year/$11 million
Mark Melancon	January 16, 2015	1 year/$5.4 million
Sean Rodriguez	January 16, 2015	1 year/$1.9 million
Tony Watson	January 16, 2015	1 year/$1.7 million
Travis Snider	January 16, 2015	1 year/$2.1 million
Jared Hughes	January 16, 2015	1 year/$1.1 million
Josh Wall	January 30, 2015	Minor league contract^{[A]}
Neil Walker	February 7, 2015	1 year/$8 million
Vance Worley	February 10, 2015	1 year/$2.45 million
Vince Deyzel	February 12, 2015	Minor league contract
Pedro Álvarez	February 19, 2015	1 year/$5.75 million
Alen Hanson	March 4, 2015	1 year
Andrew Lambo	March 4, 2015	1 year
Arquimedes Caminero	March 4, 2015	1 year
Bobby LaFromboise	March 4, 2015	1 year
Brandon Cumpton	March 4, 2015	1 year
Casey Sadler	March 4, 2015	1 year
Elías Díaz	March 4, 2015	1 year
Gerrit Cole	March 4, 2015	1 year
Gregory Polanco	March 4, 2015	1 year
Jaff Decker	March 4, 2015	1 year
Jameson Taillon	March 4, 2015	1 year
Jeff Locke	March 4, 2015	1 year
John Holdzkom	March 4, 2015	1 year
Jordy Mercer	March 4, 2015	1 year
Justin Sellers	March 4, 2015	1 year
Nick Kingham	March 4, 2015	1 year
Pedro Florimón	March 4, 2015	1 year
Rob Scahill	March 4, 2015	1 year
Stolmy Pimentel	March 4, 2015	1 year
Tony Sanchez	March 4, 2015	1 year
Willy García	March 4, 2015	1 year
Josh Harrison	April 8, 2015	3 year

=== Other ===
Name	Date	Details
Brad Fischer	November 5, 2014	Hired to Coaching Staff
Ramon Cabrera	November 24, 2014	Released
Andy Oliver	December 11, 2014	Lost in Rule 5 Major League Draft (to Phillies)
Luis Urena	December 11, 2014	Lost in Rule 5 AAA Draft (to Rays)
Tyler Waldron	December 11, 2014	Lost in Rule 5 AAA Draft (to Cardinals)
Josh Lindblom	December 19, 2014	Released
Jamey Carroll	January 12, 2015	Hired as Special Assistant to Baseball Operations
Brian Esposito	January 15, 2015	Hired as Minor League Manager
Dru Scott	January 15, 2015	Hired as AA Trainer
Furey Leva	January 15, 2015	Hired as AA Strength And Conditioning Coach
Justin Meccage	January 15, 2015	Promoted to AA Pitching Coach
Kevin Riggs	January 15, 2015	Hired as AA Hitting Coach
Mendy López	January 15, 2015	Hired as Dominican League Manager
Michael Ryan	January 15, 2015	Hired as Minor League Manager
Tom Prince	January 15, 2015	Promoted to AA Manager
Wyatt Toregas	January 15, 2015	Hired as Minor League Manager
Michael Clemens	January 16, 2015	Released (From R)
Drew Maggi	March 9, 2015	Released (From AA)
Kevin Ross	March 10, 2015	Released (From A)
Walker Gourley	March 11, 2015	Retired (From Adv A)
Carlos Ruiz	March 20, 2015	Released (From R)
Chris Peacock	March 25, 2015	Released
Ashley Ponce	March 26, 2015	Released (From Adv A)
Nate Baker	March 26, 2015	Released (From AA)
Ryan Beckman	March 26, 2015	Released (From AA)
Zach Von Rosenberg	March 26, 2015	Released (From A)
D.J. Crumlich	March 31, 2015	Released (From Adv A)
Matt Nevarez	March 31, 2015	Released (From AA)
Andrew Dennis	April 1, 2015	Released (From R)
Colter Moore	April 1, 2015	Released (From R)
Raul Fortunato	April 1, 2015	Released (From Adv A)
Remy De Aza	April 1, 2015	Released (From R)
Will Kendall	April 1, 2015	Released (From A)
Danny Collins	April 1, 2015	Released (From A)
Joan Montero	April 1, 2015	Released
Taylor Lewis	April 1, 2015	Released
Dwight Childs	April 5, 2015	Released (From AA)
Miguel Perez	April 5, 2015	Released (From AA)
Stolmy Pimentel	April 10, 2015	Waived
Cory Rhodes	April 13, 2015	Released (From R)
Jonathan Sandfort	April 13, 2015	Released (From R)

Legend

- ^{A} – invited to training camp

== Draft picks ==
2015 Top 10 Rounds Draft Picks
Rd	#	Player	Pos	DOB and Age	School	Signed
1	19	Kevin Newman	SS	August 4, 1993 (aged 21)	University of Arizona (AZ)	June 15, 2015
CB A	32^{[a]}	Ke'Bryan Hayes	3B	January 28, 1997 (aged 18)	Concordia Lutheran High School (TX)	June 16, 2015
2	62	Kevin Kramer	SS	October 3, 1993 (aged 21)	University of California, Los Angeles (CA)	June 16, 2015
3	96	Casey Hughston	LF	June 9, 1994 (aged 20)	University of Alabama (AL)	June 18, 2015
4	127	Jacob Taylor	RHP	July 5, 1995 (aged 19)	Pearl River Community College (MS)	June 18, 2015
5	157	Brandon Waddell	LHP	June 3, 1994 (aged 21)	University of Virginia (VA)	July 16, 2015
6	187	J. T. Brubaker	RHP	November 17, 1993 (aged 21)	University of Akron (OH)	June 12, 2015
7	217	Mitchell Tolman	3B	June 4, 1994 (aged 21)	University of Oregon (OR)	June 18, 2015
8	247	Seth McGarry	RHP	January 5, 1994 (aged 21)	Florida Atlantic University (FL)	June 12, 2015
9	277	Bret Helton	RHP	July 25, 1993 (aged 21)	University of Utah (UT)	June 12, 2015
10	307	Logan Sendelbach	RHP	May 5, 1994 (aged 21)	Tiffin University (OH)	June 18, 2015

Notes

- ^{a} Compensation pick for the Toronto Blue Jays signing Russell Martin.

== Farm system ==
Level	Team	League	Manager
AAA	Indianapolis Indians	International League	Dean Treanor
AA	Altoona Curve	Eastern League	Tom Prince
A	Bradenton Marauders	Florida State League	Michael Ryan
A	West Virginia Power	South Atlantic League	Brian Esposito
A-Short Season	West Virginia Black Bears	New York–Penn League	Wyatt Toregas
Rookie	Bristol Pirates	Appalachian League	Edgar Varela
Rookie	GCL Pirates	Gulf Coast League	Milver Reyes
Rookie	DSL Pirates	Dominican Summer League	Mendy López

LEAGUE CHAMPIONS: West Virginia Black Bears
