= The Redstone Rocket =

The Redstone Rocket may refer to:

- Redstone (rocket)
- The Redstone Rocket, a military newspaper serving Redstone Arsenal (near Huntsville, Alabama).
- A nickname for Jeff Locke
