= Jung-ho Kang =

South Korean baseball player (born 1987)

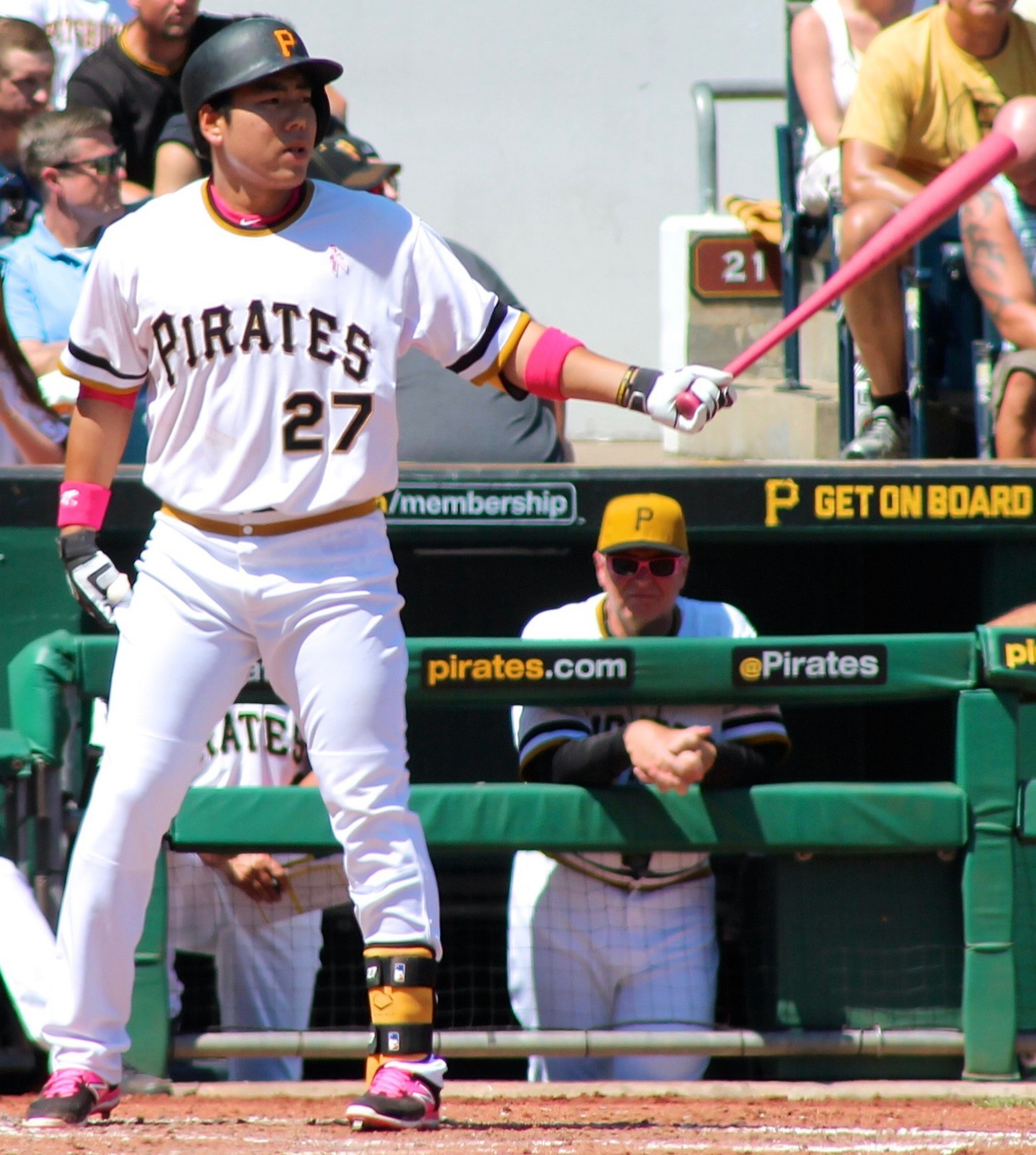
- Kang with the Pittsburgh Pirates in 2015
- Third baseman / Shortstop
- Born: April 5, 1987 (age 39); Gwangju, South Korea
- Batted: Right Threw: Right

Professional debut
- KBO: April 8, 2006, for the Hyundai Unicorns
- MLB: April 8, 2015, for the Pittsburgh Pirates

Last appearance
- KBO: October 17, 2014, for the Nexen Heroes
- MLB: July 29, 2019, for the Pittsburgh Pirates

KBO statistics
- Batting average: .298
- Home runs: 139
- Runs batted in: 545

MLB statistics
- Batting average: .254
- Home runs: 46
- Runs batted in: 144
- Stats at Baseball Reference

Teams
- Hyundai Unicorns (2006–2007); Nexen Heroes (2008–2014); Pittsburgh Pirates (2015–2016, 2018–2019)

Career highlights and awards
- 5× KBO League All-Star (2010–2014); 4× KBO League Golden Glove Award (2010, 2012–2014); KBO Slugging Percentage leader (2014)
Medals
Men's baseball
Representing South Korea
Asian Games
Gold medal – first place	2010 Guangzhou	Team
Gold medal – first place	2014 Incheon	Team

- Jung-ho Kang
- Hangul: 강정호
- Hanja: 姜正浩
- RR: Gang Jeongho
- MR: Kang Chŏngho
- IPA: Korean: [kaŋdʑʌŋho]

Jung-ho Kang (Korean: 강정호; Korean pronunciation: [kaŋ.dʑʌŋ.ɦo]; born April 5, 1987) is a South Korean former professional baseball third baseman. He played in the KBO League for the Hyundai Unicorns and Nexen Heroes, as well as in Major League Baseball (MLB) for the Pittsburgh Pirates.

== Early life ==
While attending Gwangju Jeil High School, Kang's main position was catcher. In 2004, Kang was selected for the South Korean national under-18 team as a third baseman and was part of the team that won bronze at the World Junior Baseball Championship. In 2005, Kang helped Gwangju Jeil High School win the Golden Lion Flag Championship, winning the Outstanding Pitcher Award and the RBI title.

== Professional career ==
=== Hyundai Unicorns ===
Kang was drafted by the Hyundai Unicorns in the second round of the 2006 Korea Baseball Organization (KBO) First-Year Player Draft. Kang struggled to make an impact in his first two seasons. In his rookie season, he played 10 games and batted .150. He struck out eight times in 21 plate appearances. In 2007, he appeared in 20 games and hit .133.

=== Nexen Heroes ===
In 2008, Hyundai sold the Unicorns, who subsequently became defunct and were replaced with a new team, the Woori Heroes (renamed the Nexen Heroes in 2009). Kang became the starting shortstop for the Heroes in 2008, appearing in 116 games, batting .271 with 8 home runs and 47 RBI.

In 2009, Kang had an impressive offensive season. He finished the season with a .286 batting average, 23 home runs, 81 RBI, a .508 slugging percentage, 136 hits, and 71 runs scored. Kang tied Hong Sung-heon of the Lotte Giants for the league lead in doubles (33).

In 2010, Kang had his first season with a plus-.300 batting average. He finished with an average of .301, as well as 12 home runs and 58 RBI. His defensive play earned him his first KBO League Golden Glove Award. Kang won a gold medal at the 2010 Asian Games as a member of the South Korean national baseball team as he hit 3 home runs in 13 at-bats.

In 2011, Kang regressed slightly from his two previous seasons, hitting .282 with 9 home runs and 63 RBI.

In 2012, Kang improved, hitting .314 with 25 home runs (2nd in the league), 82 RBI, 77 runs scored, and a career-high 21 stolen bases. He would also win another Gold Glove Award, the second of his career.

In March 2013, Kang competed in the 2013 World Baseball Classic.

In the 2013 KBO regular season, Kang hit 22 home runs and had an OPS of .876. He also won his second straight Gold Glove Award, his third overall.

In 2014, Kang had his best season statistically, hitting .356 with 40 home runs and 117 RBI. He led the league in slugging percentage (.739) and OPS (1.198). He also finished second in home runs (40) and OBP (.459), third in both RBIs (117) and doubles (36), and fifth in runs scored (103). He also won his third straight Gold Glove Award, his fourth overall, and fourth in five seasons, establishing himself as a premier defensive player.

=== Pittsburgh Pirates ===
On December 22, 2014, the Pittsburgh Pirates won the bidding for the exclusive (30-day) opportunity to sign him to a Major League Baseball contract. The Pirates' winning bid was later revealed to be $5,002,015 (₩5,457,150,000). This transfer fee (posting system) was to be paid to the Nexen Heroes for the exclusive rights to negotiate a contract, and as compensation for the loss of Kang. To put this in perspective, at the time of the Kang signing (Dec '15-Jan '16), the then-record high international transfer fee posted was the December 8, 2011, transfer of the RHP Yu Darvish from the Hokkaido Nippon-Ham Fighters of the NPB (Japanese Professional Baseball organization) to the Texas Rangers for $51,703,411.

==== 2015 season ====
On January 16, 2015, Kang was signed to a four-year, $11 million contract with the Pittsburgh Pirates, with a club option for a fifth year.

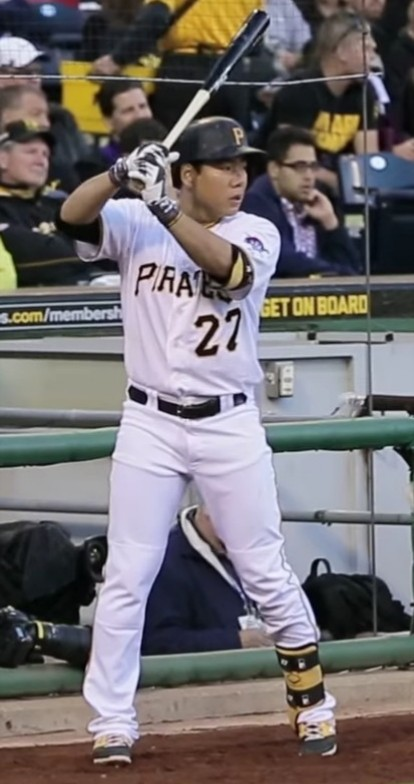
Kang in the on-deck circle for the Pittsburgh Pirates in 2015

Kang made the decision to train with his former Korean club, Nexen Heroes, who had arrived in Surprise, Arizona for their Spring Training (hosted at the spring training facility of the Texas Rangers). While there Kang focused on strength training. There was plenty of South Korean-based media coverage surrounding Kang, as he was to be the first KBO position player (non-pitcher) to be developed entirely within the Korean system to jump to the Major Leagues.

In spring training, Kang was given the opportunity to compete for the starting shortstop job held by Jordy Mercer. In the first spring training game of 2015, in his second at-bat, Kang connected on a 0-1 fastball, driving an opposite field solo home run in the third inning, helping the Pirates to a 5-0 lead, and eventual 8-7 win over the Toronto Blue Jays.

On April 4, 2015, Kang recorded his first Major League hit off Kyle Lohse of the Milwaukee Brewers, a flare just past the outstretched glove of shortstop Jean Segura.

On April 21, Kang recorded his first RBI against the Chicago Cubs with a bases-clearing RBI double that gave the Pirates an 8–5 lead.

On May 3 on the road against the Central leading Cardinals, in St. Louis, down 1-0, Kang came to bat to lead off the top of the 9th inning. Facing St. Louis Cardinals closer Trevor Rosenthal, Kang connected on the first pitch of the inning sending a game-tying solo home run into the left-center seats, knotting the game at 1–1.

On May 9, 2015, during a 7–5 win over the Cardinals, the Pirates became the first MLB team to turn a 4–5–4 triple play. The play occurred when the Cardinals' Yadier Molina lined out to second baseman Neil Walker. Walker threw to Kang at third base to double-off Jhonny Peralta for the second out. Kang then threw the ball back to Walker, who was standing on second base, for the final out after Jason Heyward froze between second and third.

On September 8, 2015, Kang connected on an impressive 472-ft solo shot, his 14th of the season, on the road against the Cincinnati Reds.

On September 17, 2015, during a game against the Chicago Cubs, Kang was covering second base in a double play attempt. Baserunner Chris Coghlan attempted to break up the double play aggressively by sliding into Kang. Coghlan collided with Kang's left knee, fracturing his leg and tearing his MCL. Kang was placed on the 60-day disabled list and would miss the remainder of the season, including the post season NL wild card game, which the Pittsburgh Pirates played host to the Chicago Cubs.

On October 7, during the pre-game introductions of the NL Wild Card game, Kang used a wheelchair to appear on the field, where he received a standing ovation. This was his first public appearance since the incident.

In 126 games played in 2015, Kang hit .287 with 15 home runs and 58 RBIs. Kang placed third in the National League Rookie of the Year voting, collecting a 19% share.

==== 2016 season ====
On May 6, 2016, Kang played in his first MLB game since his September 17, 2015, injury. He hit two solo home runs in the game, contributing to the Pirates 4–2 road win over their NL Central division rival St. Louis Cardinals. In only 103 games, Kang ended the season batting .255 with a career-high 21 home runs and 62 RBIs.

==== 2016 legal troubles ====
In early July 2016, a sexual assault claim was made against Kang by a 23-year-old Chicago woman. No charges were brought against Kang, as the accuser would not cooperate with the police investigation.

On December 1, 2016, Kang was involved in a high-speed DUI-induced hit-and-run in South Korea, which culminated in him fleeing his vehicle on foot. The incident was confirmed by videos from both municipal (traffic) CCTV and Kang's dashcam. Kang was subsequently found guilty of his third DUI, and as a result, his request for a work visa to enter the United States for the 2017 season was denied.

==== 2017 season ====
As a result of the DUI incident, the Pirates placed Kang, whose visa was revoked, on the Restricted List on March 11. Kang was not on the Pirates' 40-man roster for the year, as he could not obtain a work visa to travel to the United States. On May 18, Kang's suspended sentence was upheld by a Korean court, meaning that he was disallowed from working or playing any professional sport legally in the United States in 2017.

Kang played in the Dominican Professional Baseball League for the 2017–2018 winter season, with the Águilas Cibaeñas. He batted just .143 with one home run in 24 games, which brought about an early release from the team.

==== 2018 season ====
On April 26, 2018, it was revealed that Kang successfully renewed his visa, meaning that he was eligible for activities in the United States once again. He was also cleared by the Pirates organization to return to the team.

In speaking with reporters on June 6, 2018, Kang said through a translator that he was sober and had voluntarily enrolled in the Joint Drug Treatment Program. "I'm just trying to be as careful as possible in everything that I do. Obviously, I'm not touching a drop of alcohol moving forward," he said. On June 15, 2018, the Pirates reinstated Kang to their 40-man roster from the restricted list and optioned him to Triple-A Indianapolis.

On September 28, 2018, with only 3 games left on the schedule, Kang made his season debut on the road in Cincinnati against the last-place Reds. He was inserted into the game in the top of the seventh inning, as a pinch hitter. This was his first AB in the major leagues since October 2, 2016, a span of four days short of two years. Kang ended the 2018 MLB season batting .333, having gone 2 for 6 with 2 singles and a strikeout in 3 games.

On October 31, the Pirates declined their option to sign Kang for the fifth year of his contract, thus making him eligible as a free agent for the 2019 season. On November 8, 2018, the Pirates re-signed Kang to a one-year/$3M deal with the opportunity to compete for the starting 3B job with Colin Moran, who had been acquired to fill Kang's position during his absence. Kang was a free agent for one week. The deal was financially very similar to the original contract.

==== 2019 season ====
On February 24, 2019, in his spring debut, Kang homered in his first two Grapefruit League at bats, against Miami. On March 18, 2019, the Pittsburgh Pirates named Kang to be their starting 3rd baseman for the 2019 season. On April 3, 2019, Kang hit his first MLB home run since the 2016 season, in the 3rd inning against the Cardinals off Miles Mikolas. On August 2, 2019, the Pirates designated Kang for assignment after he hit .169 with 10 home runs in 185 plate appearances. Kang was released on August 4, 2019.

=== Free agency and KBO reinstatement ===
In early 2020, Kang worked out for a Milwaukee Brewers affiliate club, but failed to sign a deal. He decided to return to South Korea, and later filed for reinstatement from the "voluntarily retired" list in order to play in the KBO League.

However, due to three drunk driving incidents in his past, Kang was required to face a penalty that would include a suspension for up to 3 years per the KBO League rule book. The KBO League disciplinary committee had to decide whether the rule, which was instituted in 2018, would be applicable retroactively to Kang's third DUI arrest in 2016 when he was not a KBO player.

On May 25, 2020, Kang received a one-year suspension from the league and was also ordered to undergo 300 hours of community service. The disciplinary committee decided not to apply the DUI rule retroactively to his 2016 arrest, opting instead to give him the maximum punishment for his other 2 arrests which occurred when he was an active KBO player. Kang did not play organized baseball in 2021.

On March 18, 2022, Kang returned to the KBO League by signing a one-year, $25,000 contract with his former team, now named the Kiwoom Heroes. However, on April 29, the KBO declined to approve the contract and Kang became a free agent.
