= Andrew Lambo =

American baseball player (born 1988)

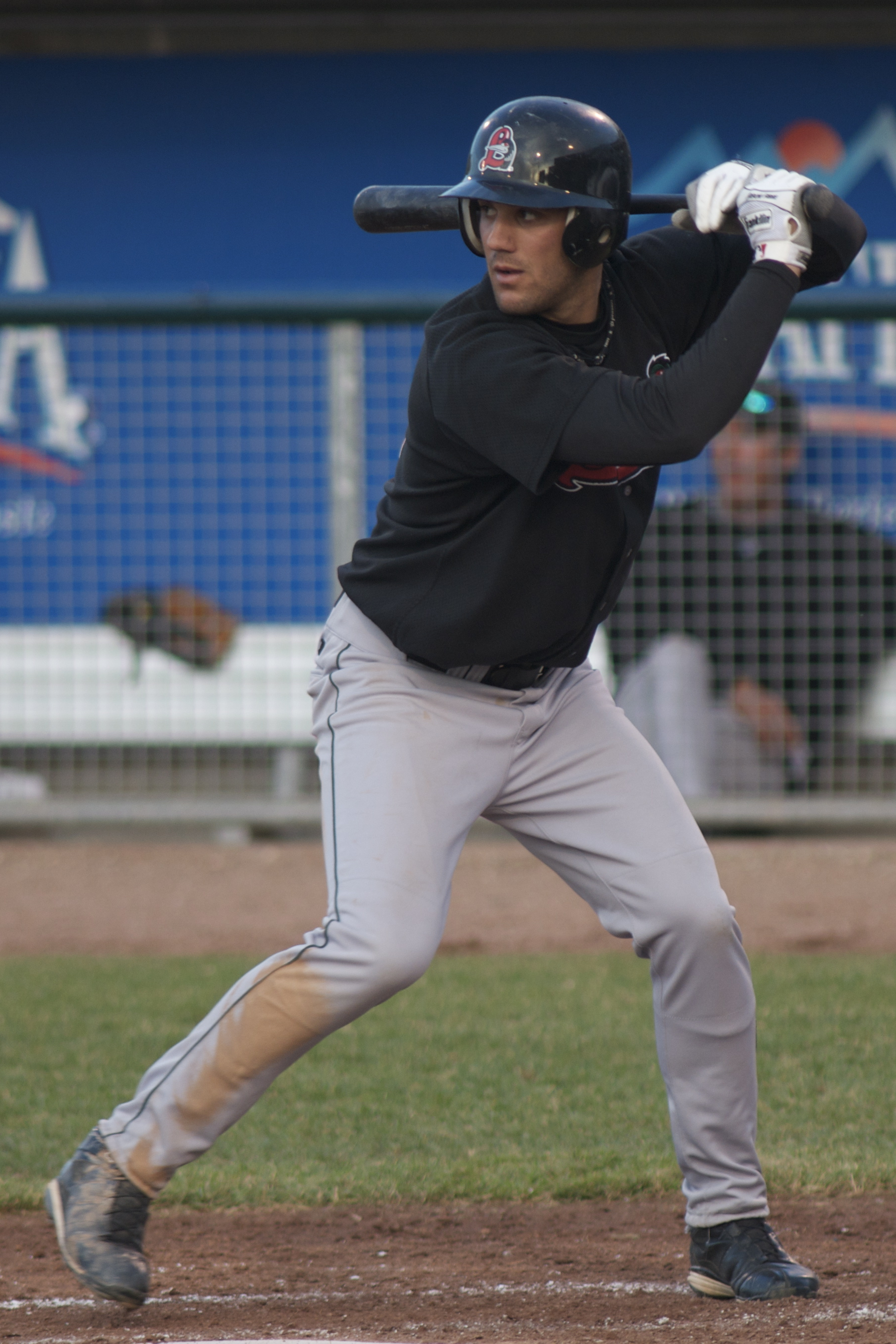
- Lambo with the Great Lakes Loons in 2008
- Outfielder/First baseman
- Born: August 11, 1988 (age 38); Newbury Park, California, U.S.
- Batted: Left Threw: Left

MLB debut
- August 13, 2013, for the Pittsburgh Pirates

Last MLB appearance
- April 7, 2016, for the Oakland Athletics

MLB statistics
- Batting average: .189
- Hits: 18
- Home runs: 1
- Runs batted in: 3
- Stats at Baseball Reference

Teams
- Pittsburgh Pirates (2013–2015); Oakland Athletics (2016)

Andrew Francis Lambo (born August 11, 1988) is an American former professional baseball outfielder and first baseman. He played in Major League Baseball (MLB) for the Pittsburgh Pirates and Oakland Athletics.

== Career ==
=== Los Angeles Dodgers ===
Lambo was selected by the Los Angeles Dodgers in the 4th round of the 2007 MLB draft out of Newbury Park High School. He played for the Gulf Coast Dodgers in 2007, and the Great Lakes Loons and Jacksonville Suns in 2008. He was selected as Midwest League All-Star Outfielder in 2008 while with the Loons. In 2009 & 2010, while with the Double-A Chattanooga Lookouts, BaseballAmerica.com rated him as the organization's top rated prospect of 2009. He was selected to represent the Lookouts at the 2009 Southern League mid-season All-Star game. On May 1, 2010, Lambo was suspended for 50 games by Major League Baseball for testing positive for a banned drug of abuse. On July 31, 2010, he was traded (along with pitcher James McDonald) to the Pittsburgh Pirates for reliever Octavio Dotel.

=== Pittsburgh Pirates ===
Lambo hit .236 with 11 home runs and 58 RBI in 2011 playing for the Double-A Altoona Curve and the Triple-A Indianapolis Indians. He missed most of 2012 with a wrist injury.

Lambo hit for the cycle on April 8, 2013, the first cycle in Altoona Curve history. After he hit .284 with 24 doubles, 5 triples, 31 home runs and 97 RBI in 117 games split between Altoona and Indianapolis, the Pirates announced on August 12, 2013, that Lambo would be called up to Major League Baseball for the first time on August 13. He was optioned back to Indianapolis on August 18, and recalled on August 24. On September 28, 2013, Lambo hit his first and only career home run, a pinch-hit home run in the 6th inning against Cincinnati Reds pitcher Logan Ondrusek, the 6th home run hit by the Pirates that day. After the season, Lambo earned the organization's Minor League Player of the Year award after his 32 home runs ranked fourth among all minor league players. Lambo played winter baseball in Venezuela and played first base to prepare for the upcoming season.

For the Pirates, Andrew Lambo played in eight games in 2013, six games in 2014 and eight games in 2015, each in left or right field, except for one game at first base in 2014.

In the fourth inning on Sunday, September 14, 2014, in his only career game played at first base, Lambo was a part of the Pirates first triple play in PNC Park history, a 5-4-3 triple play from Josh Harrison to Neal Walker to Andrew Lambo against the Chicago Cubs.

=== Oakland Athletics ===
Lambo was claimed off waivers by the Oakland Athletics on November 6, 2015. He made the Athletics' Opening Day roster. In June 2016, Lambo was diagnosed with testicular cancer. He underwent surgical treatment, after which he made a full recovery. On October 6, 2016, Lambo was outrighted off of the 40-man roster and elected free agency on October 9. Lambo was resigned to a minor league contract for 2017. He played just 12 games with the Triple-A Nashville Sounds before landing on the disabled list with an injured wrist. Though cleared to play, he was released by the Athletics on May 14, 2017.

=== Bridgeport Bluefish ===
On June 6, 2017, Lambo signed with the Bridgeport Bluefish of the Atlantic League of Professional Baseball. In 67 games he hit .293/.360/.423 with 5 home runs, 33 RBIs and 2 stolen bases.

=== Lancaster Barnstormers ===
On November 1, 2017, Lambo was drafted by the Lancaster Barnstormers in the Bridgeport Bluefish dispersal draft.
