= Gorkys Hernández =

Venezuelan baseball player (born 1987)

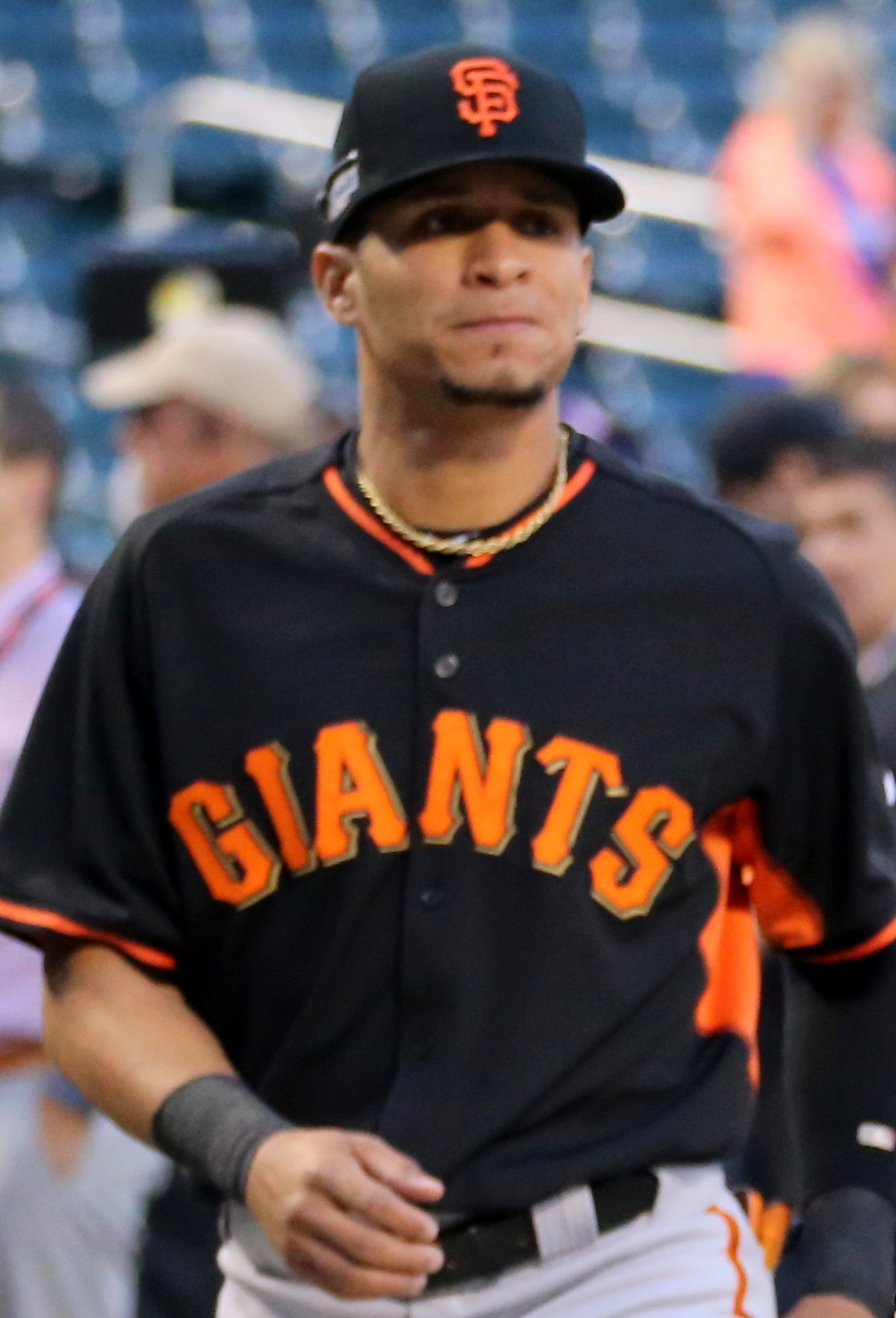
- Hernandez with the San Francisco Giants in 2016

Delfines de La Guaira – No. 5
- Outfielder
- Born: September 7, 1987 (age 39); Güiria, Venezuela
- Bats: Right Throws: Right

MLB debut
- May 21, 2012, for the Pittsburgh Pirates

MLB statistics (through 2019 season)
- Batting average: .230
- Home runs: 20
- Runs batted in: 81
- Stats at Baseball Reference

Teams
- Pittsburgh Pirates (2012); Miami Marlins (2012); Pittsburgh Pirates (2015); San Francisco Giants (2016–2018); Boston Red Sox (2019)

Gorkys Gustavo Hernández Lugo (born September 7, 1987) is a Venezuelan professional baseball outfielder for the Delfines de La Guaira of the Venezuelan Major League. Hernandez signed with the Detroit Tigers in 2005. He played in Major League Baseball (MLB) for the Pittsburgh Pirates, Miami Marlins, San Francisco Giants, and Boston Red Sox. He is signed to the Tigres de Aragua of the Venezuelan Professional Baseball League.

== Early life ==
Gorkys Gustavo Hernández Lugo was born on September 7, 1987, in Güiria, Venezuela.

== Professional career ==
=== Minor leagues ===
Hernandez signed with the Detroit Tigers in April 2005. In 2007, as a member of the West Michigan Whitecaps, he was named a Midwest League midseason and postseason All-Star, was chosen as Midwest League MVP, and competed in the All-Star Futures Game for the World Team. On October 29, 2007, Hernández was traded by the Detroit Tigers along with pitcher Jair Jurrjens to the Atlanta Braves in exchange for shortstop Édgar Rentería.

Hernández was listed as the fifth-best prospect in the Atlanta Braves organization by Baseball America. before the 2008 season. On June 3, 2009, the Braves traded Hernández along with Charlie Morton and Jeff Locke to the Pittsburgh Pirates in exchange for Nate McLouth.

=== Pittsburgh Pirates (2012) ===
On May 18, 2012, he was called up to the big league club. He made his major league debut on May 21, and struck out as a pinch hitter. On May 27, he got his first major league hit, a 2-run single off Chicago Cubs pitcher Michael Bowden.

=== Miami Marlins (2012) ===
On July 31, 2012, the Pirates traded Hernández and a 2013 draft pick to the Miami Marlins for Gaby Sánchez and Kyle Kaminska.

=== Kansas City Royals ===
On July 21, 2013, Hernández was traded to the Kansas City Royals organization. Hernández was assigned to the Omaha Storm Chasers, the Royals' Triple-A affiliate. On November 23, 2013, Hernandez re-signed a minor league contract with Kansas City.

=== Chicago White Sox ===
On April 10, 2014, Hernández was traded to the Chicago White Sox for cash considerations and assigned to the Triple-A Charlotte Knights. He was released on June 11, 2014.

=== Return to the Pirates (2015) ===
Hernández rejoined the Pirates on December 1, 2014, agreeing to a minor league deal that included an invitation to spring training. On June 28, 2015, Gorkys Hernández was called up to the majors and started in right field.

=== San Francisco Giants (2016–2018) ===
In 2016, Hernández agreed to a minor league deal with the Giants. The Giants promoted him to the major leagues on August 23 to replace the injured Gregor Blanco. In 2018, due to numerous injuries to the outfield, he was placed as the center fielder for the Giants, establishing career highs offensively.

=== Boston Red Sox (2019) ===
On December 11, 2018, Hernández signed a minor league deal with the Boston Red Sox, and was assigned to the Triple-A Pawtucket Red Sox. On September 1, 2019, the Red Sox selected Hernández's contract, adding him to their active MLB roster. He appeared in 20 games with the 2019 Red Sox, batting .143 with two RBIs. With Triple-A Pawtucket, he appeared in 123 games, batting .219 with 16 home runs and 53 RBIs. Hernández was removed from Boston's 40-man roster in October and sent outright to Pawtucket. On October 21, he elected to become a free agent.

=== Chicago White Sox (second stint) ===
On February 17, 2020, Hernández signed a minor league contract with the Chicago White Sox. He did not play in a game in 2020 due to the cancellation of the minor league season because of the COVID-19 pandemic. Hernández was released by the White Sox organization on June 18.

=== Pericos de Puebla ===
On December 18, 2020, Hernández signed with the Pericos de Puebla of the Mexican League. In 21 games for Puebla in 2021, Hernández slashed .253/.337/.410 with four home runs and 13 RBI.

=== Sultanes de Monterrey ===
On June 17, 2021, Hernández was traded to the Sultanes de Monterrey. In 12 games for Monterrey, Hernández hit .227/.358/.273 with no home runs or RBI. On July 13, Hernández was released by the Sultanes.

=== Diablos Rojos del México ===
On July 17, 2021, Hernández signed with Diablos Rojos del México. In 10 games, he went 4–for–32 with one RBI. Hernández was released on August 7.

=== Piratas de Campeche ===
On June 8, 2022, Hernández signed with the Piratas de Campeche. In 20 appearances for Campeche, he slashed .254/.365/.302 with no home runs and six RBI. Hernández was released by the Piratas on July 4.

=== Delfines de La Guaira ===
On May 18, 2026, Hernández signed with the Delfines de La Guaira of the Venezuelan Major League. In 55 games he batted .361/.502/.481 with 4 home runs and 34 RBIs.

== Personal life ==
On 24 June 2026, Hernández's wife, Deisy Tovar de Hernández, was killed in the 2026 Venezuela earthquakes.

== Awards and honors ==
- Gulf Coast League Post Season All-Star (2006)
- Midwest League All-Star (2007)
- 3x All-Star Futures Game participant (2007, 2008, 2010)
- Midwest League MVP (2007)
- Midwest League Postseason All-Star (2007)
- Midwest League All-Star (2008)

== See also ==
- List of Major League Baseball players from Venezuela
