= Arquimedes Caminero =

Dominican baseball player (born 1987)

Arquímedes Caminero
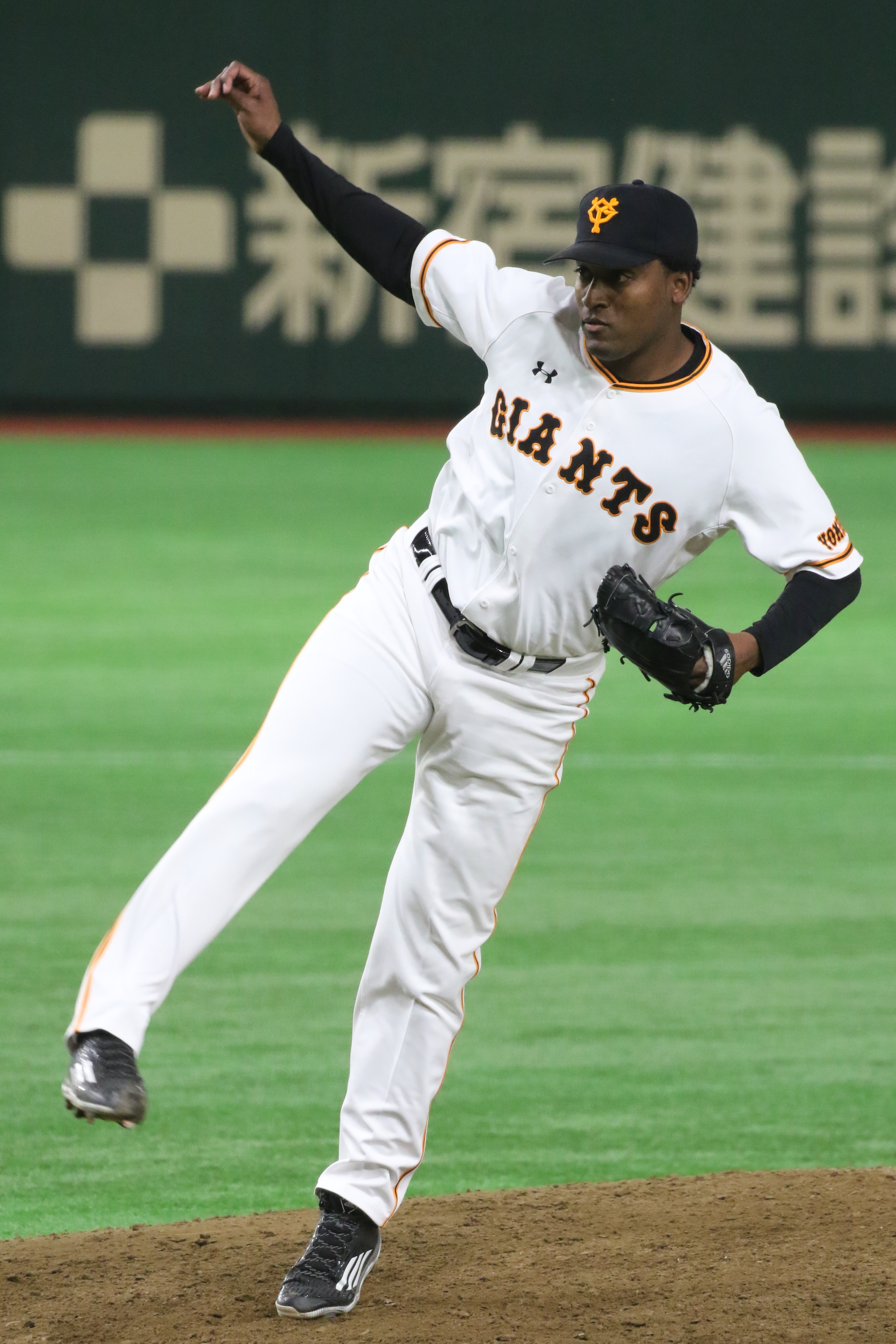
- Caminero with the Yomiuri Giants
- Pitcher
- Born: June 16, 1987 (age 39); Santo Domingo, Dominican Republic
- Batted: Right Threw: Right

Professional debut
- MLB: August 16, 2013, for the Miami Marlins
- NPB: March 31, 2017, for the Yomiuri Giants

Last appearance
- MLB: October 2, 2016, for the Seattle Mariners
- NPB: September 18, 2018, for the Yomiuri Giants

MLB statistics
- Win–loss record: 7–5
- Earned run average: 3.83
- Strikeouts: 143
- WHIP: 1.40

NPB statistics
- Win–loss record: 4–6
- Earned run average: 3.18
- Strikeouts: 84
- Saves: 40
- Stats at Baseball Reference

Teams
- Miami Marlins (2013–2014); Pittsburgh Pirates (2015–2016); Seattle Mariners (2016); Yomiuri Giants (2017–2018)

Arquímedes Euclides Caminero Ordóñez (born June 16, 1987) is a Dominican former professional baseball pitcher. He played in Major League Baseball (MLB) for the Pittsburgh Pirates, Miami Marlins, and Seattle Mariners. He also played in Nippon Professional Baseball (NPB) for the Yomiuri Giants.

== Playing career ==
=== Florida / Miami Marlins ===
Prior to playing professionally, Caminero attended Colegio Buen Pastor in the Dominican Republic. He was signed by Marlins scout Fred Ferreira and began his professional career with the Dominican Summer League Marlins in 2006, with whom he went 0–1 with a 7.36 ERA in 18 relief appearances. In 2007, again with the DSL Marlins, Caminero went 2–3 with a 2.83 ERA in 16 games (four starts), striking out 48 batters in 47 2/3 innings. He moved stateside for 2008, splitting the season between the rookie-level Gulf Coast League Marlins (14 games), Jamestown Jammers (six games), and Greensboro Grasshoppers (one game), going a combined 1–1 with a 2.60 ERA in 21 relief appearances, striking out 31 batters in 27 2/3 innings. In 2009, he pitched for the Jammers (15 games), Grasshoppers (10 games) and Jupiter Hammerheads (two games), posting a combined 3–1 record with a 5.53 ERA in 27 appearances, striking out 61 batters in 40 2/3 innings. In 2010, he pitched for the Grasshoppers and went 5–2 with a 3.01 ERA in 48 appearances, finishing 22 games and striking out 97 batters in 74 2/3 innings. From 2011 to 2012, he compiled a 1–0 record with 3 saves in 32 games. He had a 9.00 ERA in 2011 and a 1.64 ERA in 2012 with Jupiter and the Jacksonville Suns. He started the 2013 season with Jacksonville. His 2013 stats in the minor were a 3.48 ERA, a 1.01 WHIP, 69 strikeouts, and 6–2 record with 5 saves playing for both Jacksonville and the Triple-A New Orleans Zephyrs.

The Marlins promoted Caminero to the major leagues on August 16, 2013. He made his major league debut on the same day, throwing a scoreless inning while striking out one and hitting a batter. He made 3 more appearances before being sent to Triple-A. He was recalled on September 1 when rosters expanded. His 2013 pitching statistics with the Marlins were a 2.77 ERA, a 1.00 WHIP, 20 strikeouts, and 1 hold in 13 innings pitched. He started the 2014 season in Triple-A team but was called up when Jacob Turner was put on the DL with a shoulder injury. On April 21, after allowing a game-winning home run to Jayson Werth, he was sent back down to New Orleans. He was called back up in May, but only made one appearance before being sent back down. With the Marlins he has a 10.80 ERA, a 1.80 WHIP, 8 strikeouts, and a 0–1 record. His 2014 minor league stats were a 4.86 ERA, a 1.59 WHIP, 79 strikeouts, and a 4–1 record with 10 saves for New Orleans.

On January 28, 2015, Caminero was designated for assignment by the Marlins.

=== Pittsburgh Pirates ===
On February 4, 2015, Caminero was traded to the Pittsburgh Pirates in exchange for cash considerations. Caminero played in the major leagues for the Pirates in the 2015 and 2016 seasons.

=== Seattle Mariners ===
On August 6, 2016, Caminero was traded to the Seattle Mariners in exchange for a player to be named later and future considerations. On September 1, Jake Brentz and Pedro Vásquez were traded to the Pirates to complete the trade. He made 18 relief appearances for Seattle, logging a 1–1 record and 3.66 ERA with 18 strikeouts across 19 2/3 innings pitched. Caminero was released by the Mariners organization on December 16, 2016.

=== Yomiuri Giants ===
On December 17, 2016, Caminero signed with the Yomiuri Giants of Nippon Professional Baseball on a one-year, $1.15 million contract. Caminero made 57 appearances out of the bullpen in 2017, compiling a 3–5 record and 2.42 ERA with 65 strikeouts and 29 saves across 63 1/3 innings pitched.

Caminero made 20 appearances for the Giants during the 2018 campaign, registering a 1–1 record and 5.79 ERA with 19 strikeouts and 11 saves across 18 1/3 innings of work. He became a free agent following the season.

=== New York Mets ===
On January 3, 2019, Caminero signed a minor league contract with the New York Mets that included an invitation to spring training. He made 17 appearances for the Triple-A Syracuse Mets, posting an 0–2 record and 5.09 ERA with 15 strikeouts and eight saves across 17 2/3 innings pitched. Caminero was released by the Mets organization on July 12.

=== Diablos Rojos del México ===
On July 15, 2019, Caminero signed with the Diablos Rojos del México of the Mexican League. In 16 appearances for the Diablos, he logged a 1–0 record and 1.33 ERA with two saves and 19 strikeouts over 20 1/3 innings.

Caminero did not play in a game in 2020 due to the cancellation of the Mexican League season because of the COVID-19 pandemic. On June 5, 2021, Caminero re-signed with the team. In 16 games for México, he went 1–3 with a 2.50 ERA, one save, and 18 strikeouts.

== Post-playing career ==
On February 12, 2022, Caminero announced his retirement from professional baseball, and that he would be joining the Houston Astros organization as a minor league pitching instructor.

== Name ==
Caminero is named for ancient Greek mathematicians Archimedes and Euclid. In an interview with the Miami Herald, Caminero said that his father "saw the names in an algebra book and liked them."
