= Jaff Decker =

American baseball player (born 1990)

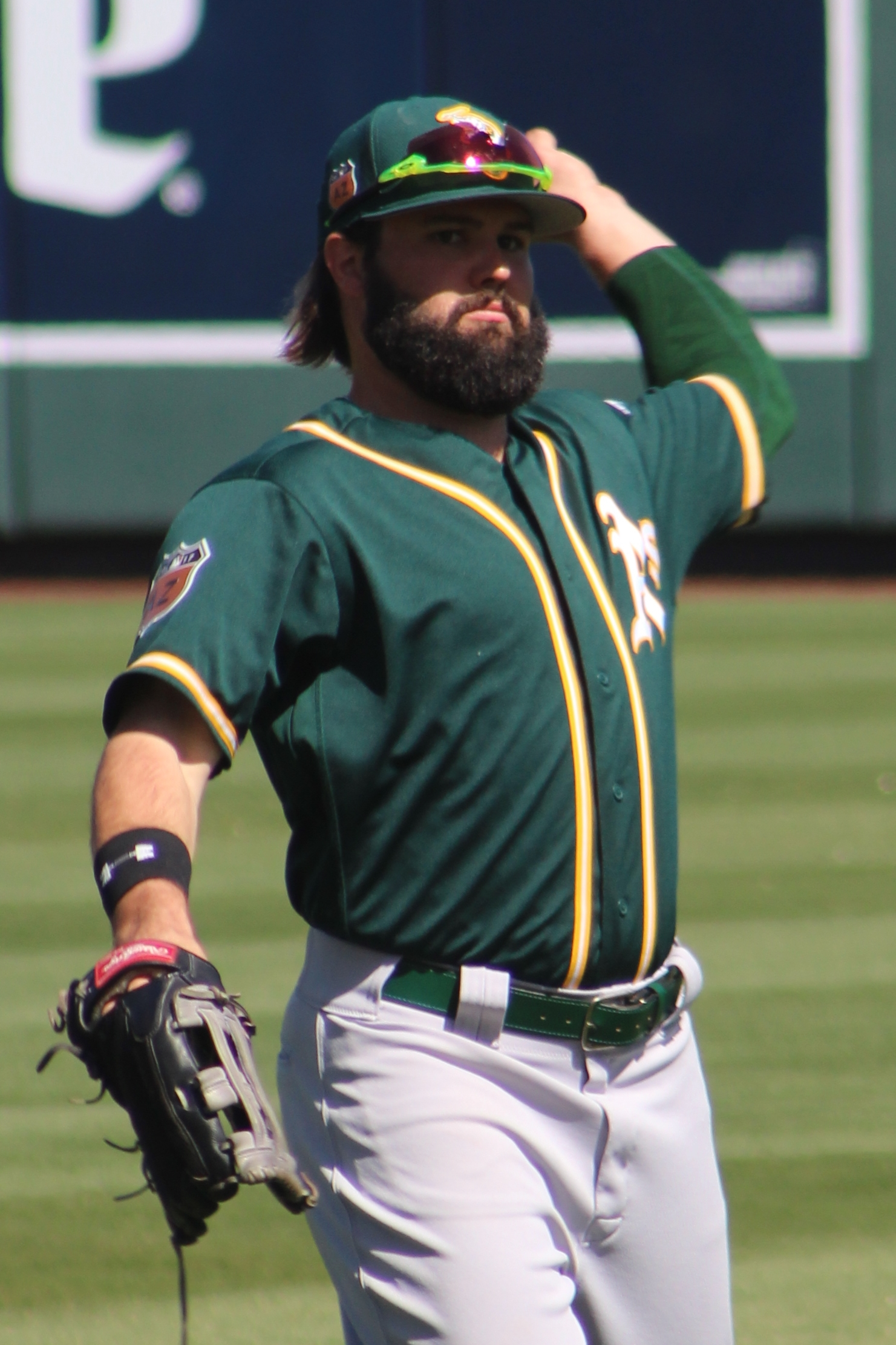
- Decker with the Oakland Athletics during spring training in 2017
- Outfielder
- Born: February 23, 1990 (age 36); Phoenix, Arizona, U.S.
- Batted: Left Threw: Left

MLB debut
- June 20, 2013, for the San Diego Padres

Last MLB appearance
- May 8, 2017, for the Oakland Athletics

MLB statistics
- Batting average: .174
- Home runs: 1
- Runs batted in: 5
- Stats at Baseball Reference

Teams
- San Diego Padres (2013); Pittsburgh Pirates (2014–2015); Tampa Bay Rays (2016); Oakland Athletics (2017)

Jaff Kyle Decker (pronounced "Jeff"; born February 23, 1990) is an American former professional baseball outfielder. He has previously played in MLB for the San Diego Padres, Pittsburgh Pirates, Tampa Bay Rays, and Oakland Athletics.

== Amateur career ==
Born in Phoenix, Arizona, Decker grew up in neighboring Peoria, where he attended Sunrise Mountain High School. As a senior, in 2008, Decker was named the Arizona state high school baseball player of the year. In 2018, Decker was part of Sunrise Mountain's inaugural class to be inducted into the school's Sports Hall of Fame, with his number, 22, being retired at the school.

== Professional career ==
=== San Diego Padres ===
==== Minor Leagues ====
The San Diego Padres selected Decker in the first round, with the 42nd overall selection, of the 2008 Major League Baseball draft. He began his professional career in 2008 with 49 games with the AZL Padres in the rookie-level Arizona League, where he had a batting average of .352 and had five home runs and 34 runs batted in (RBI), and three games with the Eugene Emeralds of the Low–A Northwest League, where he went 2-for-10, giving him an overall batting average of .343 for the season. Decker played the full 2009 season with the Fort Wayne TinCaps in the Single–A Midwest League, putting up a .299 batting average and .956 on-base plus slugging percentage (OPS) in 104 games with 16 home runs and 64 RBI. He was ranked among Baseball America's Top 100 Prospects heading into 2010.

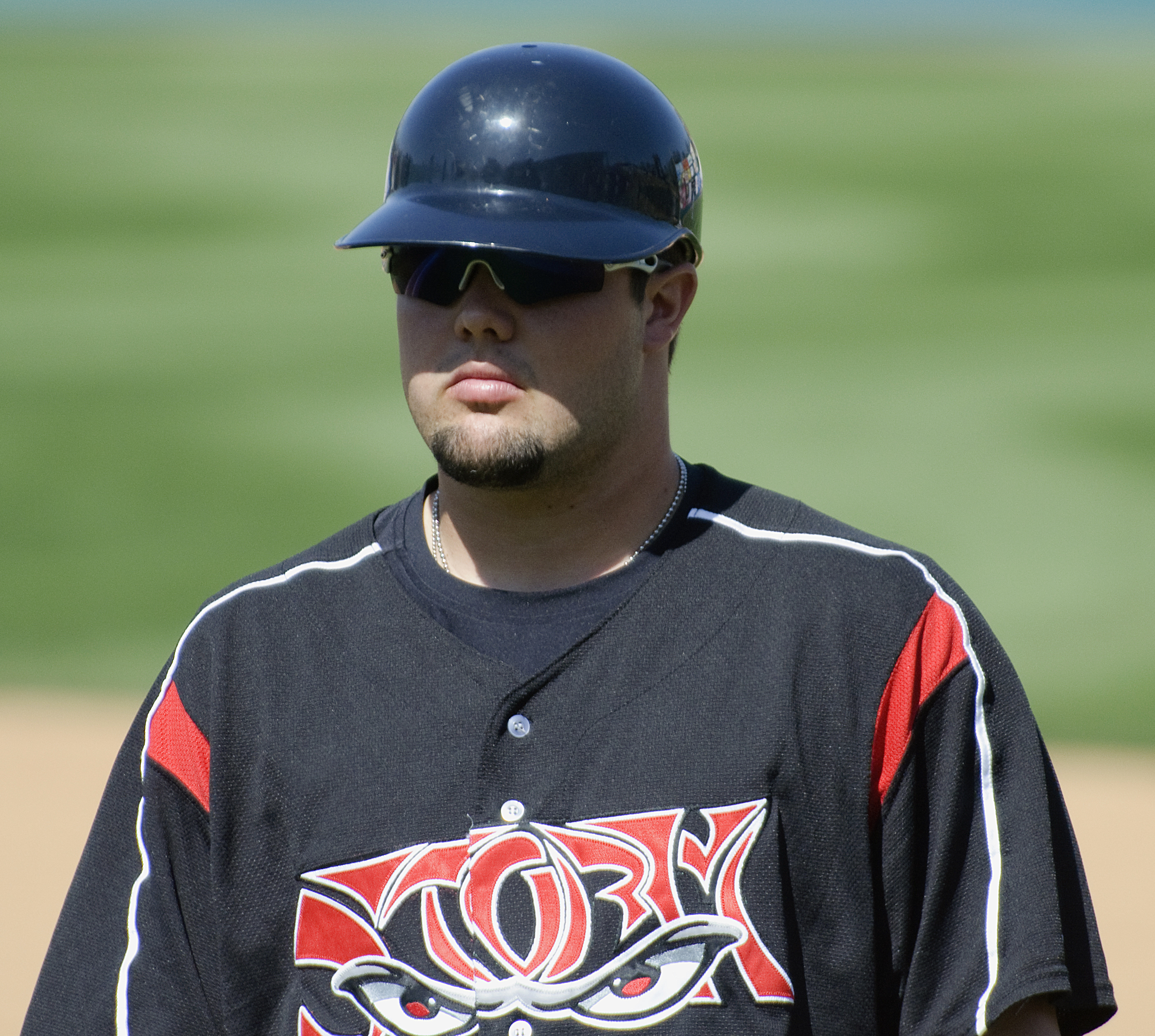
Decker with the Lake Elsinore Storm in 2010

Promoted to the Lake Elsinore Storm in the High–A California League in 2010, Decker hit .262 with an .874 OPS, hit 17 home runs, and drove in 58 runs, but he was limited to 79 games by injuries. When he was placed with the San Antonio Missions in the Double–A Texas League in 2011, Decker's average fell to .236, but he hit 19 home runs, stole 15 bases, and scored 90 runs in 133 games, holding his OPS at .790. On November 20, 2012, the Padres added Decker to their 40-man roster to protect him from the Rule 5 draft. Decker started the 2012 season with San Antonio. and suffered from plantar fasciitis early in the season before he tore his plantar tendon on May 31, 2012. This limited him to only 47 games and a .184 batting average, three home runs, and nine RBI with San Antonio. Combined with a nine-game rehabilitation stint with the AZL Padres in which he batted .296, hit a home run, and drove in seven runs, he played in only 56 games and had only a .201 average for the 2012 season as a whole.

Decker began 2013 with the Tucson Padres in the Triple–A Pacific Coast League.

=== San Diego Padres ===
Decker was called up to the Padres for the first time on June 12, 2013, to replace Cameron Maybin, who was placed on the disabled list, but he was optioned back to Tucson on June 14 without appearing in a game, briefly becoming a phantom ballplayer. He was recalled to San Diego on June 19 when Everth Cabrera went on the disabled list, and made two pinch-hitting appearances in which he walked and reached base on an error before being sent back to Tucson. He reached the major leagues for a third time on August 10, 2013, when Carlos Quentin was placed on the disabled list. On August 12, Decker recorded his first major-league hit, a solo home run off of Colorado Rockies starting pitcher Jhoulys Chacín during a 14–2 loss. Decker made seven starts for the Padres in left field in August 2013, playing in 13 games overall on the year and collecting four hits in 26 at-bats (.154). The Padres returned Decker to Tucson on August 26, when they called up Reymond Fuentes, and Decker stayed in Tucson after major-league rosters expanded to 40 players in September. At Tucson, Decker hit .286 for the season with 10 home runs and 40 RBI.

The Padres designated Decker for assignment on November 20, 2013, to make room for multiple prospects on their 40-man roster.

=== Pittsburgh Pirates ===
On November 25, 2013, the Padres traded Decker to the Pittsburgh Pirates along with Miles Mikolas in exchange for Alex Dickerson. The Pirates optioned him to the Indianapolis Indians in the Triple–A International League on March 25, 2014. During three stints with the Pirates during 2014, Decker played in five major-league games, going 0-for-5, and he played in 104 games for Indianapolis, hitting .257 with six home runs and 39 RBI. In 2015, he had two major-league stints with the Pirates, playing in 23 games, hitting .214, and driving in a run, and played the rest of the year with Indianapolis, hitting .266 with three home runs and 26 RBI in 69 games.

On August 25, 2014, while Indianapolis was on the road for a game against the Columbus Clippers, fans created the Official Jaff Decker Fan Club, to root for Decker from Section 27 at Huntington Park in Columbus, Ohio, while he played left field for the Indians against Columbus. The fan club disbanded in 2015.

=== Tampa Bay Rays ===
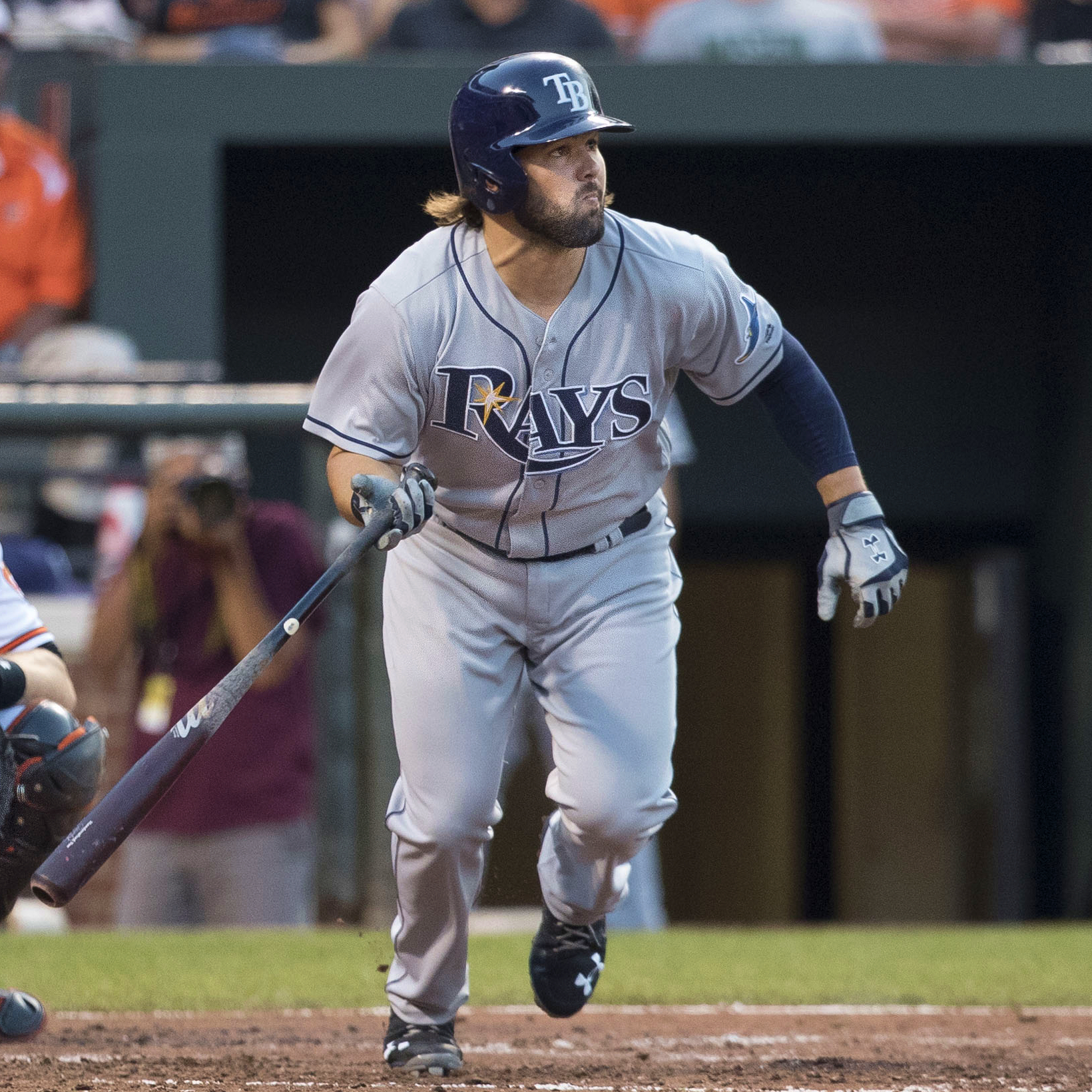
Decker with the Tampa Bay Rays in 2016.

On January 22, 2016, Decker signed a minor league contract with the Tampa Bay Rays. He appeared in 19 games for the Rays in 2016, hitting .154 and driving in a run, and in 99 games with the Durham Bulls in the Triple–A International League, where he hit .255 with 12 home runs and 35 RBI. On October 11, Decker was removed from the 40–man roster and sent outright to Durham, an assignment which he rejected in favor of free agency.

=== Oakland Athletics ===
On November 22, 2016, Decker signed a minor league contract with the Oakland Athletics with an invitation to major league spring training. In the final cut of spring training, the Athletics assigned Decker to the Nashville Sounds of the Triple–A Pacific Coast League to begin the 2017 season. On April 15, 2017, the Athletics selected Decker's contract from Nashville and added him to the Oakland's 25-man active roster. He hit .200 with an RBI in 17 games for Oakland before the Athletics removed him from the 40–man roster and sent him outright to Nashville on May 13. He remained with the Sounds for the rest of the season, and during the year played in 93 games for Nashville, hitting .274 with six home runs and 36 RBI. Decker elected free agency after the season's close.

=== Atlanta Braves ===
On January 27, 2018, Decker signed a minor league deal with the Atlanta Braves. Atlanta assigned him to the Gwinnett Stripers in the Triple–A International League, where he played in 15 games, hitting .274 with a home run and four RBI before the Braves released him on May 1.

=== Washington Nationals ===
On May 22, 2018, the Washington Nationals signed Decker to a minor league contract. The Nationals assigned him to the Syracuse Chiefs in the Triple–A International League. He was released by the Nationals organization on July 17.

== Personal life ==
Decker's first name is pronounced 'Jeff'. He was named in honor of his uncle, who died in military service. Decker's grandfather intended to name his son 'Jeff', but the hospital nurse recorded it as 'Jaff', and the spelling was passed on to his nephew.
