= Jeff Locke (baseball) =

American baseball player (born 1987)

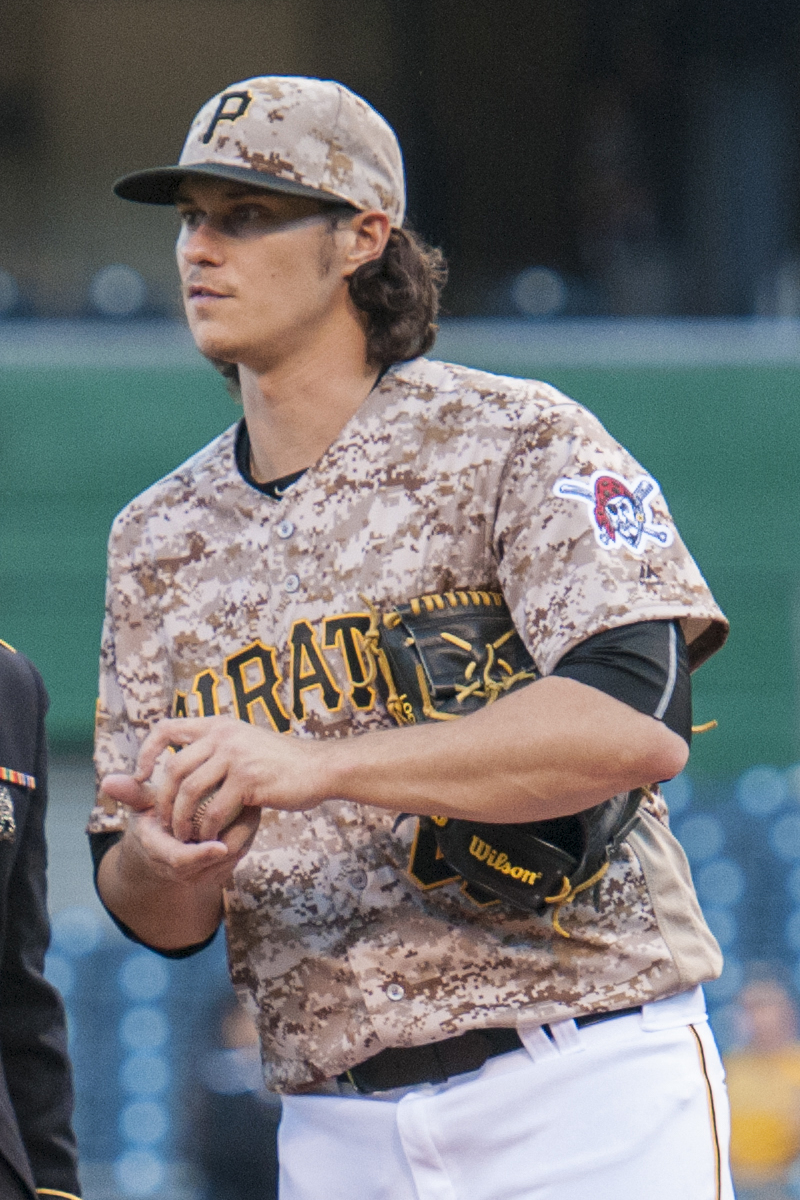
- Locke with the Pittsburgh Pirates
- Pitcher
- Born: November 20, 1987 (age 38); North Conway, New Hampshire, U.S.
- Batted: Left Threw: Left

MLB debut
- September 10, 2011, for the Pittsburgh Pirates

Last MLB appearance
- July 3, 2017, for the Miami Marlins

MLB statistics
- Win–loss record: 35–43
- Earned run average: 4.59
- Strikeouts: 481
- Stats at Baseball Reference

Teams
- Pittsburgh Pirates (2011–2016); Miami Marlins (2017)

Career highlights and awards
- All-Star (2013)

Jeffrey Alan Locke (born November 20, 1987) is an American former professional baseball pitcher. He played in Major League Baseball (MLB) for the Miami Marlins and Pittsburgh Pirates, where he was an All-Star in 2013.

== Early life ==
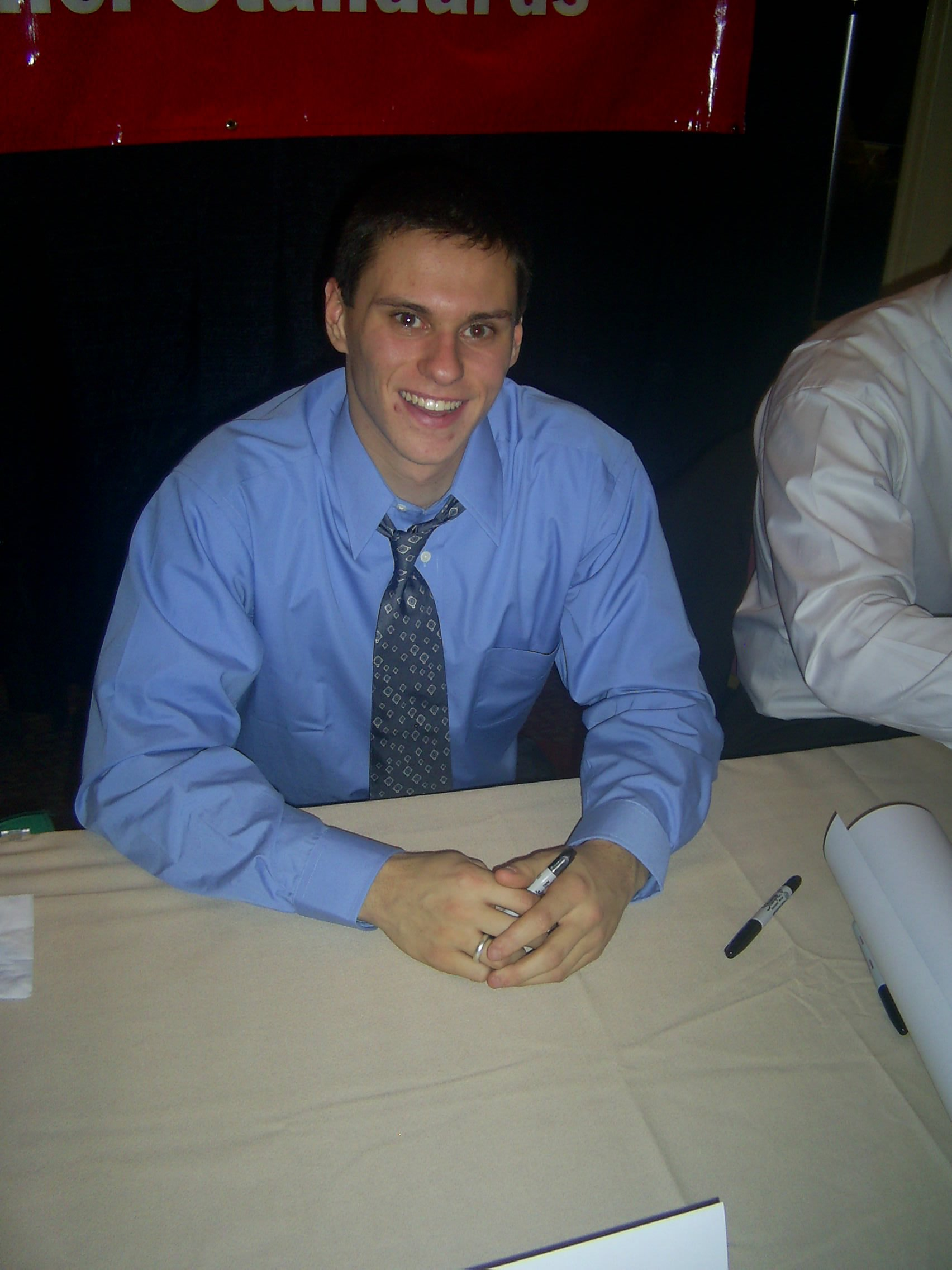
Locke at the 2007 New Hampshire Baseball Dinner

Locke is the son of Alan and Pam Locke and the grandson of Greta Locke. In 2003, his first year, he was a New Hampshire State Second-Team All-Star. In 2004, his second year, he was a New Hampshire State First-Team All-Star. In 2005, his junior year, he was the New Hampshire player of the year and a New Hampshire State First-Team All-Star. In 2006, his senior season, he was the New Hampshire player of the year, a New Hampshire State First-Team All-Star, co-captain of the Kennett High baseball team, and he shared the Jack Burns Baseball Award. In June 2006, Locke graduated from A. Crosby Kennett High School. Locke is the all-time leader in wins for Kennett High School.

=== The Redstone Rocket ===
Locke is nicknamed "The Redstone Rocket". In June 2006, The Conway Daily Sun sports editor Lloyd Jones established the nickname because of Locke's fastball, the name of his hometown (Redstone, New Hampshire, a village within the town of Conway, New Hampshire), and in reference to America's first man in space, Alan Shepard of Derry, New Hampshire, whose Freedom 7 flight was launched by a Redstone rocket.

== Career ==
=== Atlanta Braves ===
Locke was the first selection in the second round in the 2006 Major League Baseball draft by the Atlanta Braves. Locke was assigned to the Gulf Coast Braves (Rookie League) upon signing with the organization on June 18, 2006. In June 2007 the Atlanta Braves assigned Locke to the Danville Braves in the Advanced Rookie Appalachian League. In November 2007, Baseball America ranked Locke No. 8 on their Atlanta Braves Top 10 Prospects list. Locke played for the Rome Braves in 2008. In December 2008, Baseball America ranked Locke No. 7 on their Atlanta Braves Top 10 Prospects list. Locke started the 2009 season with the Myrtle Beach Pelicans.

=== Pittsburgh Pirates ===
On June 3, 2009, the Braves traded Locke to the Pittsburgh Pirates along with Charlie Morton and Gorkys Hernández, in exchange for Nate McLouth.

When Locke was acquired, the Pirates assigned him to their High-A affiliate, the Lynchburg Hillcats. In 2010, the Pirates took control of the Sarasota Reds and moved the team to Bradenton, where the club was renamed the Bradenton Marauders. Locke was assigned to the new team and was the starting pitcher in the team's second-ever game, against the Fort Myers Miracle on April 9, 2010. On July 14, 2010, Locke was promoted to the Pirates' Double-A affiliate, the Altoona Curve. In January 2011, Baseball America ranked Locke No. 8 on their Pittsburgh Pirates Top 10 Prospects list. In 2011, Locke pitched for Altoona and the Indianapolis Indians before being called up to the majors in September 2011. He made his MLB debut on September 10, 2011, against the Florida Marlins which resulted in a loss. He pitched a total of 4 games in 2011 for the Pittsburgh Pirates and went 0–3 with an ERA of 6.48 and 5 strikeouts. In November 2011, Baseball America ranked Locke No. 10 on their Pittsburgh Pirates Top 10 Prospects list. Locke recorded his first career win on October 1, 2012, giving up one run in six innings against the Atlanta Braves. In 2013, he was selected as an All-Star by San Francisco Giants manager Bruce Bochy. Locke did not pitch in the game due to back stiffness. Despite making the 2013 All-Star team, Locke was demoted to Altoona on August 28. Locke had a 2.15 ERA in his first 18 starts, but then had an 8.10 ERA over his next eight. Locke was also left off the NLDS roster.

Locke was promoted from Altoona in a spot start on June 8, 2014, after Gerrit Cole was placed on the disabled list. After being recalled for the 2nd stint of the season Locke showed success, carrying a 2.13 ERA over his last seven starts before the 2014 All-Star Break, including a very dominant performance against his mentor, A. J. Burnett, where he picked up his second win of the season. In 2015, Locke made 30 starts for the Pirates, going 8–11 with a 4.49 ERA.

Locke began the season in the Pirates rotation, despite posting a record of 8–6, Locke's ERA stood at 5.54 and he was soon moved to the bullpen for the remainder of the season. On November 29, 2016, Locke was designated for assignment by the Pirates. On December 2, Pittsburgh non-tendered Locke, making him a free agent.

=== Miami Marlins ===
On December 12, 2016, Locke signed a one-year contract with the Miami Marlins. On the first workout day of spring training, Locke said he was feeling discomfort while tossing from 60 feet away. Locke's MRI came back clean, but on March 30, 2017, he was put on the 10-day disabled list. On June 1, Locke returned to the Marlins, and gave up one run over 5 2/3 innings against the Arizona Diamondbacks. On July 3, against the St. Louis Cardinals, Locke surrendered 11 earned runs over 2 2/3 innings as the Cardinals beat the Marlins 14–6, bringing his ERA up to 8.16 for the season. In his career against the Cardinals, he had an 0–7 record. This also gave the Marlins a record of 0–6 in games started by Locke during the 2017 season. The next day, he was designated for assignment. Locke cleared waivers and was sent down to the Jupiter Hammerheads, the Marlins' High-A affiliate, but never pitched for the team in a game. He elected free agency following the season on October 2.

Locke sat out the 2018 season, dealing with a partially torn labrum in his shoulder. Although he received offers from multiple Major League teams Locke chose not to sign with another team until he felt fully healthy.

== Pitching style ==
Prior to 2009, Locke used an over-the-head pitching delivery. Upon his trade to the Pirates, pitching coach Wally Whitehurst recommended that Locke change his pitching style to incorporate a turn toward first base. which would aid in deceptiveness. Locke returned to the overhead delivery during spring training in 2016, because he had gotten increasingly inconsistent results over the years by looking toward first base. Locke throws a two-seam fastball (88–95), a circle changeup (79–82), and a knuckle curveball (77–84). In 2016, Locke's knuckle curve has become more of a slurve.

== Awards ==
- New Hampshire State High School Baseball Second-Team All-Star (2003)
- 3x New Hampshire State High School Baseball First-Team All-Star (2004, 2005, 2006)
- 2x New Hampshire State High School Baseball Player of the Year (2005, 2006)
- Jack Burns Baseball Award (2006, shared with Rob Knox)
- Appalachian League Pitcher of the Week (July 17–23, 2007)
- Appalachian League Post-Season All-Star (2007)
- Baseball America Rookie All-Star (2007)
- Carolina League Pitcher of the Week (April 28 – May 4, 2009)
- Florida State League Mid-Season All-Star (2010)
- Eastern League Mid-Season All-Star (2011)
- MLB All-Star (2013)
