= Yadier Molina =

Puerto Rican baseball player (born 1982)

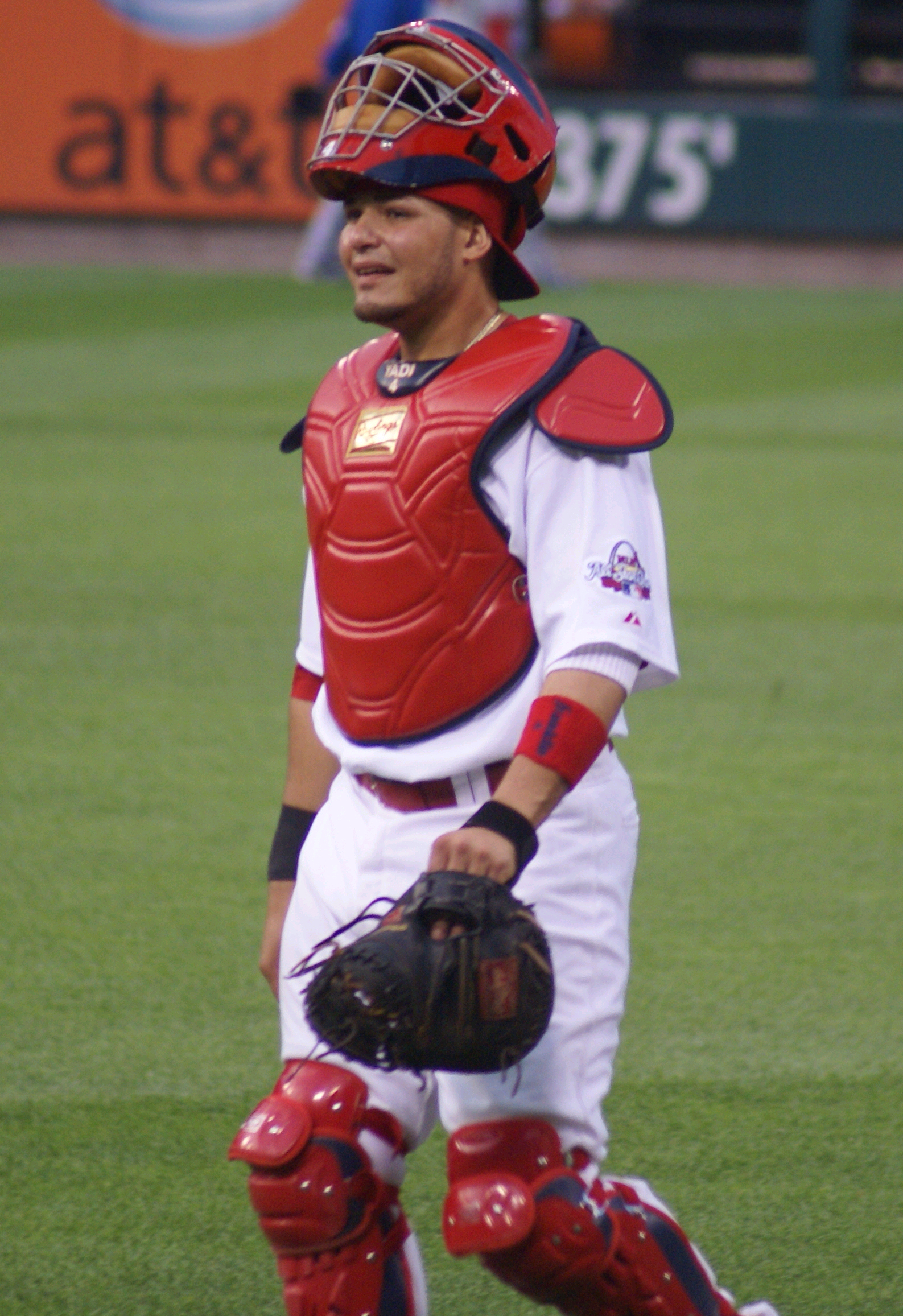
- Molina with the St. Louis Cardinals in 2009
- Catcher
- Born: July 13, 1982 (age 44); Bayamón, Puerto Rico
- Batted: Right Threw: Right

MLB debut
- June 3, 2004, for the St. Louis Cardinals

Last MLB appearance
- October 5, 2022, for the St. Louis Cardinals

MLB statistics
- Batting average: .277
- Hits: 2,168
- Home runs: 176
- Runs batted in: 1,022
- Stats at Baseball Reference

Teams
- St. Louis Cardinals (2004–2022)

Career highlights and awards
- 10× All-Star (2009–2015, 2017, 2018, 2021); 2× World Series champion (2006, 2011); 9× Gold Glove Award (2008–2015, 2018); Silver Slugger Award (2013); Roberto Clemente Award (2018); St. Louis Cardinals Hall of Fame
Medals
Men's baseball
Representing Puerto Rico
World Baseball Classic
Silver medal – second place	2013 San Francisco	Team
Silver medal – second place	2017 Los Angeles	Team

Yadier Benjamín Molina (Spanish pronunciation: [ɟʝaˈðjeɾ moˈlina]; born July 13, 1982) is a Puerto Rican professional baseball manager, adviser, and former catcher who is the manager of Navegantes del Magallanes of the Venezuelan Professional Baseball League (LVBP) and a special assistant to the president of baseball operations for the St. Louis Cardinals of Major League Baseball (MLB). He played his entire 19-year MLB career with the St. Louis Cardinals from 2004 to 2022. Widely considered one of the greatest defensive catchers of all time for his blocking ability and caught-stealing percentage, Molina won nine Rawlings Gold Gloves and six Fielding Bible Awards. A two-time World Series champion, he played for Cardinals teams that made 12 playoff appearances and won four National League pennants. Molina also played for the Puerto Rican national team in four World Baseball Classic (WBC) tournaments, winning two silver medals.

When he retired after the 2022 season, Molina ranked first all-time among catchers in putouts and second all-time among catchers with 130 Defensive Runs Saved (DRS); among active players, he ranked first with 845 assists, 40.21% of runners caught stealing, and 55 pickoffs. Along with pitcher Adam Wainwright, Molina holds the records for most games started and won as a battery. As a hitter, Molina accrued more than 2,100 hits, 150 home runs, and 1,000 runs batted in (RBIs); he batted over .300 in five seasons. Other distinctions include selection to ten MLB All-Star Games, four Platinum Glove Awards, and one Silver Slugger Award. He was a two-time selection to the All-WBC Tournament Team and was a member of the 2018 MLB Japan All-Star Series.

The product of a baseball family, Molina was born in Bayamon, Puerto Rico. His father was an amateur second baseman and the all-time hits leader in Puerto Rican baseball, and his two older brothers, Bengie and José, also developed into standout defensive catchers with lengthy MLB careers. The Cardinals' fourth-round selection in the 2000 MLB draft, Molina entered the major leagues in the 2004 season and quickly showed one of the strongest and most accurate arms in the game. Over his career, he earned a reputation as a team leader, eventually formulating pregame plans to handle opposing hitters, including pitching strategies and fielder positioning.

Molina appeared on five NL Most Valuable Player Award (MVP) ballots, including finishing fourth in 2012 and third in 2013. When Hurricane Maria ravaged the island of Puerto Rico in September 2017, Molina began relief efforts for victims of the catastrophe, consequently receiving the Roberto Clemente Award in 2018.

== Early life ==
Yadier Benjamín Molina was born on July 13, 1982, in Bayamón, Puerto Rico, the youngest of three boys to Gladys Matta and Benjamín Molina, Sr. He attended Maestro Ladislao Martínez High School in Vega Alta.–Baseball in Puerto Rico is a significant part of the island's culture. Molina's father played second base as an amateur and worked as a tools technician 10 hours per day in a Westinghouse factory. The all-time hits leader in Liga de Béisbol Profesional Roberto Clemente (or Doble-A Beísbol) history, the elder Molina delivered a .320 career batting average and gained election to the Puerto Rican baseball hall of fame in 2002. Molina's two older brothers, Bengie and José, also developed into distinguished defensive catchers with lengthy careers in Major League Baseball (MLB), and each of the three won at least one World Series championship.

Each day when he completed work, Molina's father went directly home, ate dinner with his family, and crossed the street from his family's home with his sons and his son's friend Carlos Diaz to Jesús Mambe Kuilan Park, spending countless evening hours teaching them the fundamentals of the sport. He remained hopeful that his sons would become professional baseball players.

Molina's catching aptitude showed as early as age five and developed quickly. Nonetheless, he developed great competence in playing all over the baseball field and, as older brother Bengie recalled, always seemed to "be the first player taken in the youth league draft". Molina concentrated on infield positions until about age 16, when he began to develop the familiar Molina physique: as of 2013, he stood 5'11" and weighed 220 pounds.

Molina's father also sought to accelerate him on the diamond. Following Yadier's suspension from a youth league about age 15, he anticipated the desistance would stagnate his development, so he searched for an alternative. Against the wishes of coaches, family members and friends, he scheduled Yadier for a workout with the Hatillo Tigres, an amateur league team. Molina made the team after a single workout and immediately became the starting catcher. The Tigres' first baseman, Luís Rosario, was the one who recommended him to the organization. The Tigres played in a league composed mainly of players 10 or more years older than Molina, well before he was eligible for the MLB draft.

== Professional career ==
=== Draft and minor leagues ===
Minnesota Twins scout Edwin Rodríguez followed and scrutinized Molina starting in high school. He observed that Molina's skills closely resembled that of both his older brothers—both accomplished major league catchers—and decided that his defense was "polished" enough to be considered more advanced than most high schoolers in the United States. However, Molina's hitting lagged behind his defense. The initial report on his skill set was "defensive catcher, great arm, weak bat"; the closest comparable hitter as catcher was one whom the Cardinals eventually placed at the top of their organizational ladder, his future manager Mike Matheny.

Before he was drafted, Molina worked out for the Cincinnati Reds. He put on a spectacle at Riverfront Stadium with his arm and bat that grabbed the attention of executives, scouts, and prominent former Reds players, including Johnny Bench and Bob Boone. As Molina recalled, he left the session with the impression that Cincinnati intended to draft him. Undeterred by the universal reservations about his offensive ceiling, the St. Louis Cardinals instead took Molina in the fourth round of the 2000 MLB draft and signed him for $325,000.

"I saw the kid that's going to steal my job."

— Mike Matheny, when he was still the Cardinals' starting catcher, to his wife, on Molina in 2001

The Cardinals then invited Molina to major league spring training camp. Described as "raw", the young catcher worked to emulate Matheny. At one point in that extended spring training, instructor Dave Ricketts observed Molina from a golf cart during a game. Molina allowed a passed ball through his legs with a runner on third base, and raced to the backstop to retrieve the ball. Still hoping to prevent the runner from scoring, he instead found Ricketts in the golf cart parked on top of home plate. Ricketts, who had a reputation for becoming upset when minor league catchers allowed balls to bounce between their legs, removed Molina from the game and drove him to the batting cage. There, Molina later recalled, Ricketts batted 150 to 200 ground balls to improve the young catcher's ability to block pitches.

Molina began his professional career with the Johnson City Cardinals of the Rookie-level Appalachian League in 2001, playing 44 total games and batting .259. He advanced one level in each of four seasons in the minor leagues. Even without highly developed offensive skills, Molina proved difficult to strike out. Mainly a singles hitter who favored hitting the ball the other way, he batted .278 with 14 home runs and 133 runs batted in (RBIs) with 118 strikeouts in 1,044 at-bats in four minor league seasons. In his first three seasons, he threw out 111 base runners attempting to steal while allowing 133 stolen bases, for a caught-stealing percentage of 45%.

=== St. Louis Cardinals (2004–2022) ===
==== 2004–06 ====
Molina's first chance in the Major Leagues came when the incumbent catcher, Matheny, went on the disabled list (DL) with a strained rib in the Cardinals' pennant-winning season of 2004. Molina made his Major League debut on June 3. One of his first game-winning hits occurred on August 7. He stroked a broken-bat single to shallow center field in the bottom of the ninth inning against the New York Mets. On the play, the center fielder, Mike Cameron started towards the outfield wall based on Molina's full swing, not immediately realizing that he had made only partial contact because of the broken bat. By the time Cameron charged the ball, it was too late; it fell in for a hit, scoring Jim Edmonds. Three weeks later, on August 29, the Cardinals beat the Pittsburgh Pirates 6–4, thanks in part to two plays in which Molina tagged out the runner at home plate, including a collision with Ty Wigginton.

Molina appeared in 51 regular-season games and batted .267 with two home runs and 15 RBIs in 151 plate appearances. He threw out more than half of would-be base-stealers (nine of 17). In the World Series against the Boston Red Sox, manager Tony La Russa elected to start Molina over Matheny in Game 4. The Red Sox swept the Cardinals and claimed the title that game, their first in 86 years. The following offseason, Matheny signed a three-year, $10.5-million contract with the San Francisco Giants, clearing the way for Molina to become the Cardinals' starting catcher.

In 2005, Molina struggled with injuries and saw a drop off in the offensive performance in his rookie season. He doubled and scored on David Eckstein's go-ahead single on his way to three hits in a June 12 defeat of the New York Yankees, 5–3. Molina returned from a 33-game absence on August 19 induced by a hairline fracture of his left fifth metacarpal bone from being hit by a pitch on July 7. Starting pitcher Chris Carpenter, attempting to extend a winning streak to ten games on an August 19 game versus the San Francisco Giants, found himself in a 4–0 deficit in the ninth inning. Capped by Molina's three-run home run, the Cardinals rallied and won 5–4 in the ninth. The next day, Molina's suicide squeeze bunt scored Mark Grudzielanek, tying the game and allowing the Cardinals to win 4–2. Those were just two wins of 100 as St. Louis made their way to another division title following 105 wins the season before.

In 114 games, Molina posted a .252 batting average with eight home runs and 49 RBIs with just 30 strikeouts in 421 plate appearances. Defensively, he registered career-highs of nine pickoffs and a caught-stealing percentage of 64 from throwing out 25 of 39 would-be base-stealers. According to Baseball-Reference.com, as of 2024, that percentage ranked as the 28th highest all-time season-single caught stealing percentage. Since 1957, only Roberto Pérez's 71.4% in the shortened 2020 season and Mike LaValliere's 72.7% in 1993 were higher.

Before the 2006 season commenced, Molina participated in the inaugural World Baseball Classic (WBC) for Puerto Rico. After returning to the Cardinals, he changed his jersey number from 41 to 4. However, the regular season presented some of his greatest offensive challenges as he struggled through a career-worst .216 batting average in 461 regular-season plate appearances. It was a culmination of a decline over his first three seasons; Molina's on-base plus slugging percentages (OPS) registered at .684 in 2004, .654 in 2005 and .595 in 2006. The low batting average was due in part to a deflated batting average on balls in play (BABIP) of .226 (normal is around .300), a career low. (Note: Batting average on balls in play, or BABIP, is the calculation of the batting average of all playable batted balls only. It excludes strikeouts and home runs and includes sacrifice flies. This statistic is widely variable, as defense, "luck", and opposing team's talent levels all affect BABIP. Most hitters' BABIP falls within or close to the range of .290 and .300. According to Baseball-Reference.com, Molina's career BABIP was .293.)

In a May 27 game against the San Diego Padres at Petco Park in San Diego with the Cardinals holding a 4–3 lead in the bottom of the ninth, Molina picked Brian Giles off first to end the game, the first pickoff to end a major league game in nearly four years. The Cardinals faced the Padres again in the National League Division Series (NLDS) playoff game in the playoffs, he again picked a Padre off at first, this time Mike Piazza, while bailing pitcher Jeff Suppan out of a jam. For the season, he caught 41% of all base-stealing attempts and picked off seven runners.

Even as his bat languished, Molina's defense was instrumental in propelling the Cardinals to the National League Central division crown in a season heavily marred by injuries for the team. However, the following playoffs marked a turning point in his career offensive output. He posted a .358 composite batting average, .424 on-base percentage (OBP), two home runs and eight RBIs in 16 games as the Cardinals reached the World Series. He batted .308 in the National League Division Series (NLDS), .348 in the National League Championship Series (NLCS) and .412 in the World Series.

One of Molina's landmark playoff performances came in Game 7 of the NLCS against the New York Mets, the final game of the series tied at three games each. Starting in the top of the ninth, he batted with a 1–1 score. In the sixth inning, Mets left fielder Endy Chávez had prevented the Cardinals from taking the lead when he leapt to catch Scott Rolen's near-miss home run over the left field fence. This time, however, Molina hit a two-run home run off Aaron Heilman over left field that was too high for Chávez to catch and gave the Cardinals a 3–1 edge.

In the bottom of the ninth, rookie pitcher Adam Wainwright – filling in as emergency closer – found himself in a two-out, bases-loaded situation against center fielder Carlos Beltrán, who had already homered three times in the NLCS. Molina called for a mound conference. Initially, he wanted a sinker from Wainwright but changed his mind because he suspected Wainwright would overthrow it and give Beltrán an easy pitch to hit. Molina made an unconventional choice by calling for a changeup to start the sequence against Beltrán. It was called for a strike. Had Beltrán successfully got a base hit, the scheme may have caused tension for the third-year catcher with La Russa and pitching coach Dave Duncan because throwing a first-pitch changeup ran contrary to Duncan's teaching. Molina then called for two curveballs. Beltrán fouled off the first, but Wainwright struck him out looking at a "bender that started up and away and bit hard to the low inside corner" for the final out of the game. The Cardinals' conquest of the NLCS gave them a return trip to the World Series after two years. They proceeded to defeat the Detroit Tigers in five games, giving Molina his first championship ring. His mask was turned in for display at the Baseball Hall of Fame.

==== 2007–09 ====
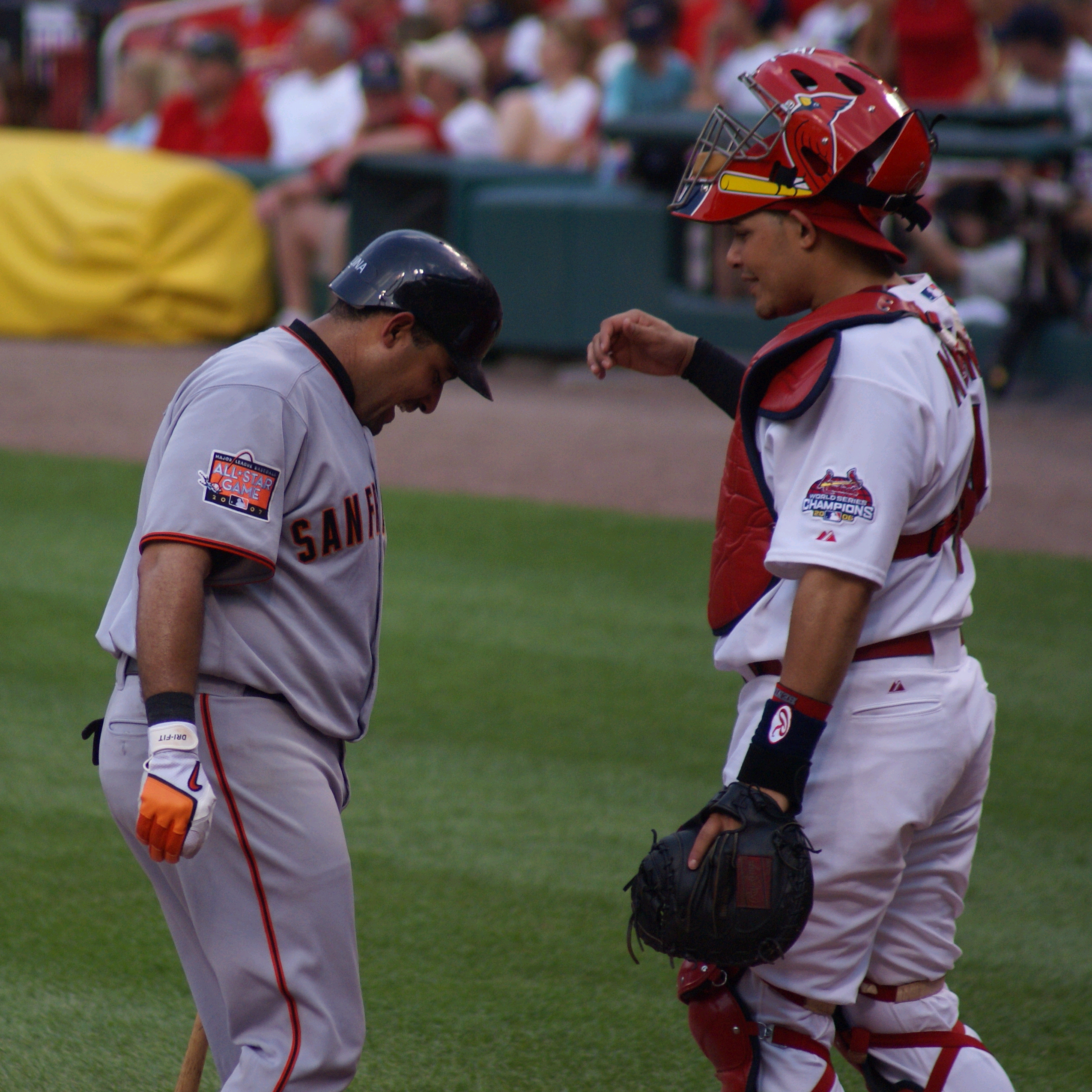
Molina interacting with his brother Bengie in a 2007 game, the first time they faced each other in the Major Leagues

Batting out of the number-five spot in the batting order for the first time in his career on Opening Day, 2007, Molina collected two hits. In a game against the Milwaukee Brewers on April 15, Molina picked Prince Fielder off first base as he leaned far off the bag, tipping off Molina and first baseman Albert Pujols to a hit and run the Brewers were planning. Four days later, Molina faced his brother Bengie for the first time in a game against the San Francisco Giants. It was also the first time they had seen each other in about three and one-half years.

From May 1 to 24, Molina strung together a then-career high 15-game hitting streak, during which he batted .373. It was the longest streak for a Cardinals catcher since Erik Pappas' 16-game streak in 1993. Molina was absent for most of June due to a fractured left wrist. In the third inning of the May 29 game against Colorado, he took a foul tip off his wrist from Rockies right fielder Brad Hawpe's bat. After missing 26 games, the Cardinals activated him from the disabled list on June 28.

The first multi-error game of Molina's career occurred July 13 against the Philadelphia Phillies on a catch and throw. In a span of 11 starts from August 2–16, he racked up four three-hit games. On August 16, he hit two home runs against the Brewers for his first career multi-homer game. Molina homered and stroked the go-ahead double in an August 22 defeat of Florida. One week later, he homered in back-to-back games against the Cincinnati Reds; he, Edmonds, and Rick Ankiel each drove in three runs in an 11–3 victory on September 2. On Yadier Molina Bobblehead Night September 19 versus Philadelphia, he stroked three hits including the game-winning single in the tenth inning.

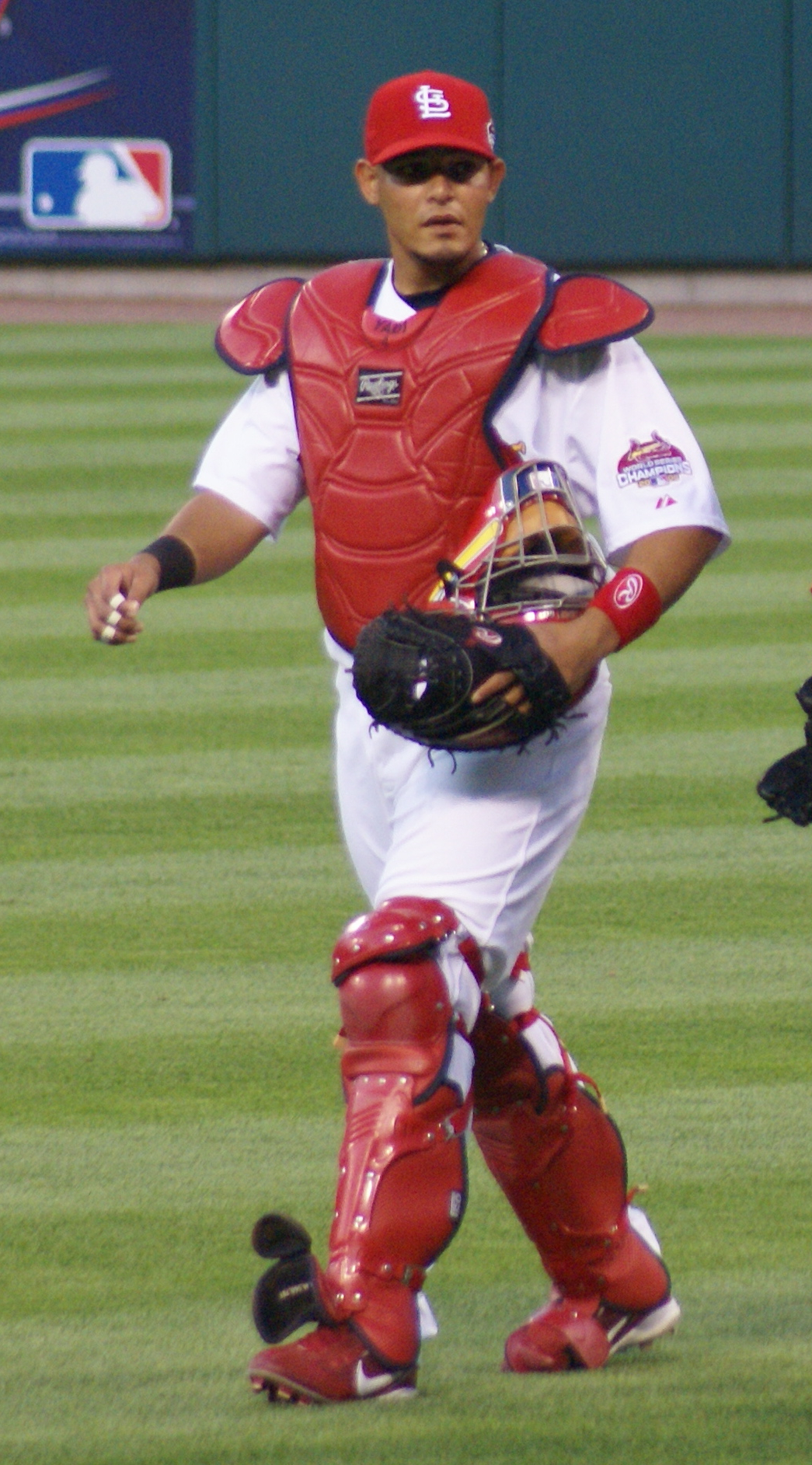
Molina with the Cardinals in 2007

Molina suffered a concussion in September and underwent arthroscopic surgery to repair torn cartilage in his right knee. The knee surgery ended his season early on September 24. In Molina's final 50 games, he successfully collected 49 hits in 158 AB for a .310 AVG. Of his final 35 starts, 12 were multi-hit games. His .281 batting average after the All-Star break ranked fifth among NL catchers. He finished the season with a new career-best .275 batting average, six home runs, and 40 RBIs in 111 games. He threw out 50% (23 of 46) baserunners attempting to steal, the highest percentage in the majors. From 2005 to 2007, he led all MLB with a 47% caught-stealing rate and 18 pick-offs.

On January 14, 2008, Molina and the Cardinals agreed to a four-year, $15.5 million deal with a club option for a fifth, cementing his position as their starting catcher. He reported to spring training having lost 15 pounds and in improved physical shape from rehabilitating following knee surgery. He started the season with an Opening Day home run and seven-game hitting streak. After a home plate collision with Eric Bruntlett on June 15 against the Philadelphia Phillies in the ninth inning, Molina sustained head and neck injuries and was removed from the field on a stretcher. There were no indications of a concussion. He held on to the ball to help the Cardinals win. He missed the next four games. To that point, Molina was batting .295 with three home runs and 24 RBIs. He also had thrown out 10 of 32 baserunners (31.3%) – well below his career average of 45% – but an Associated Press reporter attributed the decline to an inexperienced pitching staff.

Molina returned to the field against Boston at Fenway Park as the designated hitter. In that game, his solo home run provided the difference in a 5–4 Cardinals victory. It was also the first game of the first of two 13-game hitting streaks for the season. His first career start at first base, also against Boston, occurred two days later. During that streak, he collected 17 hits in 47 at-bats for a .362 batting average. The second hitting streak spanned from August 16 to September 2, where he successfully hit 19 times in 50 at bats for a .380 average. On September 2, he and Felipe López hit consecutive home runs against the Arizona Diamondbacks en route to an 8–2 victory.

Overall, Molina enjoyed a breakout offensive season, finishing with new career highs with a .304 batting average – his first over .300 – and in hits (135), OBP (.349), SLG (.392), runs (37) and RBIs (56). Of all catchers in franchise history with at least 450 PA in a season, he became just the second ever, after Simmons, to bat over .300; it was then the fourth-best season batting average; and, his 29 strikeouts were the fewest since Simmons fanned 20 times in 1976. Molina led the team and was sixth in the NL with a .340 batting average with runners in scoring position. For the season, he successfully caught 35% of opposing baserunners, still higher than the league average of 27%. He led all MLB with seven pickoffs. That November, Molina received his first Gold Glove Award, becoming the third Cardinal catcher ever to win the honor, after Tom Pagnozzi and Matheny.

Before the 2009 season commenced, Molina participated with Puerto Rico in his second WBC. When the event concluded, he returned to the Cardinals. In an April 16 game against the Arizona Diamondbacks, he reached base in all five of his plate appearances in a 12–7 victory. Starting pitcher Joel Piñeiro – struggling with his fastball command in previous starts – experimented with a sinker and shut out the New York Mets on June 24 with just two hits. Molina erased a Mets runner by throwing out Luis Castillo attempting to steal second base. Molina was batting .278 with five home runs and 25 RBIs through July 5, 2009. He was selected through fan vote to represent the Cardinals in the All-Star Game in St. Louis' Busch Stadium – his first All-Star Game. As the top vote-getter among NL catchers with 2,641,467 votes, Molina was named the NL's starting catcher. He caught eight innings and drove home a run.

Following the All-Star break on July 18, Molina's four hits and Albert Pujols' two home runs helped cap Chris Carpenter's 6–1 victory over the Diamondbacks, who pitched around nine runners on base in eight innings. On August 15, Molina picked off San Diego's Kevin Kouzmanoff at first on the way to a 7–4 victory, the 33rd of his career. At that point, Bill James Online rated that Molina saved his team fifteen total runs from pickoffs alone in his career.

A sore left knee sustained after taking a foul ball of his kneecap temporarily disabled Molina on September 26. He was back in action on October 1 against Cincinnati, although he was removed from that game due to a "tweaked" knee. He finished the season with a .293 batting average, six home runs, 54 RBIs, and a major league-leading 136 games caught, the highest franchise total since Ted Simmons' total in 1977. His strikeout rate of once every 13.9 PA was the second-lowest in the NL. While accumulating 39 mult-hit games, the Cardinals won 27 of them. He led the major leagues with eight pickoffs and was second in the NL in innings caught. He also won his second Gold Glove award after the season. The Sporting News announced that major league managers and coaches had selected Molina for the magazine's end-of-season All-Star award. For the first time in his career, Molina earned Most Valuable Player Award (MVP) consideration. He finished tied for 23rd with Miguel Tejada with one percent of the vote share.

==== 2010–11 ====
On Opening Day, April 5, 2010, Molina connected for a grand slam, becoming just the third Cardinals player to hit an Opening Day grand slam, following Mark McGwire and Scott Rolen. On April 17, he caught all 20 innings of a game against the Mets. Molina turned in a productive April, driving in 15 runners, the most for a Cardinals catcher in the month of April since Ted Simmons drove in 20 in 1977. He also continued his productivity with the bases loaded that month, collecting four hits and 11 RBIs in five at bats.

Before the All-Star break, Molina batted just .223. However, he was voted to start his second consecutive game, and second overall, and played four innings. After the All-Star break, his hitting improved, as he stroked 63 hits in 200 at bats for .315 batting average. During a game against the Cincinnati Reds on August 10, as second baseman Brandon Phillips came to bat, he exchanged words with Molina that escalated to a bench-clearing confrontation, although no one was ejected. On September 17, he amassed a career-high five RBIs and career-tying four hits against San Diego, including two doubles. After an examination on his sore right knee on September 23, Molina was shut down for the rest of the season, missing 12 games.

The final batting results for Molina's 2010 season consisted of a .262 batting average, six home runs, and 62 RBIs. He ranked as the fourth toughest in the NL to strike out with 10.2 at bats per strikeout. He led all NL catchers in at-bats (465) and stolen bases (eight), and his 122 hits ranked second, just behind Brian McCann's 123. He was tops in the NL with 24 bases-loaded RBIs, collecting eight hits in 15 AB for a .533 batting average in those situations. He also was first in the Majors with a .455 batting average (10–22) on 0–2 counts. He led all MLB catchers in innings (1138), games started (130) and assists (79), and led the NL for the third time in caught-stealing percentage at 49%. On November 1, he won his fourth consecutive Fielding Bible Award as the sole catcher. In addition, Molina became the first player at any position to win the award unanimously with a perfect score of 100. Nine days later, he was awarded his third consecutive Gold Glove Award.

With increased offensive productivity in 2011, Molina continued to help anchor the middle of Cardinals lineup in addition to the pitching staff and defense. From May 15 to 18, he put together four consecutive multi-hit games. Selected to his third consecutive All-Star Game, he substituted for the starter, McCann, played four innings and doubled in his only at-bat. Molina hit safety in 14 consecutive games from July 21 to August 11, one fewer than his career high. From July 22–25, he homered in three consecutive games, the second time in his career he had done so.

On August 2, Molina was ejected from a game against the Milwaukee Brewers for arguing a called strike. He bumped umpire Rob Drake in the chest multiple times and appeared to spit upon him. Molina later apologized, stating that he did not intend to spit on the umpire and that he "was caught up in the moment. That's what happens when you're caught up in the race and trying to win. I didn't handle it the right way." He served a five-game suspension handed down by MLB for "making contact with umpire Rob Drake multiple times and spraying him with spit twice while arguing."

Although the Cardinals stayed competitive, they were, at best, on the fringes of making the playoffs through August. On August 28, with a 70–64 record, they faced a 10 1/2-game deficit to the Braves for the wild card playoff berth with 28 left to play. Molina provided a spark to the offense in the close of the season, batting .342 in August and .341 in September. With his 30th double on September 21, he became the fourth catcher in Cardinals history to reach that milestone, following Simmons, Bob O'Farrell and Walker Cooper.

St. Louis won 20 of 28 games to finish the season, allowing them to tie the Braves for the wild card lead going into the final day. Molina caught Carpenter's 8–0 shutout of the Astros, the final game of the regular season. Meanwhile, the Philles defeated the Braves 4–3 in 13 innings, giving the Cardinals the wild card title and eliminating the Braves from the playoffs. The 10 1/2 games-won deficit marked the largest lead surrendered with 28 left to play in MLB history, consummating what St. Louis Post-Dispatch sportswriter Bernie Miklasz termed an "improbable comeback," and one of the greatest sports history. It was just the first in a series of improbable comebacks for the Cardinals in 2011.

Molina compiled a .305 batting average, 32 doubles, 14 home runs and 65 RBIs during the 2011 regular season. His batting average led the Cardinals and was eighth in the NL. However, his posted a career-low 29% caught-stealing percentage. His OPS+ (126), batting average, and hit totals led NL catchers, doubles placed second and RBIs third. His .337 batting average following the All-Star Break tied for seventh in the NL. He also led all NL catchers with 12 three-hit games, and collated 39 multi-hit games and 13 multi-RBI games.

By making the playoffs, Molina became the first catcher in franchise history to appear in five postseasons for the Cardinals. He batted .333 in the NLCS against Milwaukee, including five hits in eight AB in the final two games. In Game 1 of the World Series against the Texas Rangers, Molina threw out Ian Kinsler attempting to steal in the first inning on the way to a 3–2 win. It was the Rangers' only attempted steal of the game. That caught stealing gave Molina five in seven total chances in the 2011 postseason to that point; the Rangers had been tied with the Cardinals for most steals in that postseason. For the series, the Rangers attempted to steal four bases and were successful just once. In Game 3, Molina accumulated four RBI, and two more each in Games 6 and 7.

The Cardinals won the Series in seven games, giving Molina his second championship ring. He batted .333 and set a team World Series record with nine RBIs. It was the highest World Series RBI total among catchers since Sandy Alomar Jr., drove in 10 in 1997. Molina started all 18 games and played every inning in that 2011 playoff run, including one at first. Overall, he batted .299 with five doubles and 12 RBIs. His 20 hits were the most by a catcher in the postseason since Iván Rodríguez stroked 21 in 2003. On November 1, Molina won his fourth consecutive Gold Glove Award, becoming just the fifth catcher on a pennant-winning club to lead his position in OPS+ in his league while winning a Gold Glove. He also won the first-ever National League Rawlings Platinum Glove Award, bestowed upon one player in each league. For the second time in his career, he won MVP consideration; he finished tied for 21st for the NL MVP balloting.

==== 2012 ====
On March 1, 2012, Molina signed a five-year extension with the Cardinals worth $75 million through 2017. The contract included a $1 million signing bonus, no-trade clause, and a mutual option for 2018 worth another $15 million. The deal made him the second-highest-paid catcher in the majors. He collected his tenth career four-hit game against the Brewers on April 29 with a two-run home run that led the Cardinals to a 7–3 win. On May 1, Molina mounted the first of two two-stolen base games of the season; the other occurred August 3.

On May 27 against the Phillies, Molina blasted his third career grand slam against Roy Halladay. His made his 1,000th career appearance in an MLB game against the Chicago White Sox on June 12. From July 25 to August 7, he maintained a season-best 11-game hitting streak in which he batted .413. In a game against Pittsburgh at PNC Park on August 28, he sustained head, neck and back injuries – although no concussion – in a second-inning home plate collision with second baseman Josh Harrison. In August, he batted .403 with a .453 OBP, both tied for third in the NL. As the season progressed, he garnered widespread consideration for the National League MVP award. On September 4, Molina collected his 1,000th career hit, an infield single against the Mets at home in the second inning.

The 2012 season was one of Molina's crowning achievements as a hitter, especially considering early professional scouting reports did not forecast his bat being much of a factor in the major leagues. He set new career highs in multiple offensive categories, including a .315 batting average, 22 home runs, 76 RBI, 65 runs scored, .373 OBP, .501 slugging percentage and 12 stolen bases. He led the team in batting average for the second straight season, thus becoming the first catcher in franchise history to do so.

Panning Molina's performance National League-wide, he ranked fourth in batting average, tenth in on-base percentage, 14th in slugging percentage and tied for 18th with 46 multihit games. He led NL catchers in stolen bases and set a Cardinals single-season record for catchers, and ranked second among NL catchers in HR and third in RBIs and batting average. An aggressive hitter, he batted .380 with seven home runs on the first pitch; his home run total on first pitches ranked seventh in the NL. His 32 baserunners caught stealing topped MLB, 47.9 caught stealing percentage ranked second, and three pickoffs tied for first in the NL and were second in MLB.

From a historic perspective, Fangraphs' Dave Cameron noted that Molina's combination of offensive productivity and interception of base runners in 2012 was one of the rarest performances in history. He became just the ninth MLB catcher to post a season with a weighted runs created (WRC+) (Note: Weighted runs created plus (wRC+ or WRC+) attempts to measure a hitter's productivity in terms of a percentage relative to a league-adjusted average, scaled to the number 100 as the ballpark and league-adjusted average, and the percentage above or below average added to 100. It is a scale similar to OPS+. wRC+, based on runs created (RC) which statistician Bill James formulated, is a measurement of a theoretical number of runs a batter produces. Tom Tango evolved RC into weighted runs created (wRC), similar to wOBA, which weighs each type of hit separately, as explained in note (e).) factor of 140 and 45 percent of runners caught stealing. At 143, his WRC+ was tied for eighth all-time among catchers with at 45% of base runners caught stealing. Further, those figures aligned with peak seasons of other catchers such as Johnny Bench, Elston Howard, Carlton Fisk, and Rick Wilkins.

After being the subject of much speculation for the MVP award throughout the season, Molina ultimately finished fourth. However, he did win the prestigious and oldest award given to Latino players: the LatinoMVP award given by Latino Sports and the Latino Sports Writers & Broadcasters Association (LSWBA). He and winner Buster Posey became the first pair of catchers to finish in the top four in the award's 88-year history. However, like in years past, other awards were on their way. In November, he won his fifth straight Gold Glove award, making him the first Cardinal since Jim Edmonds to win that many consecutively, which Edmonds did in 2004. On December 4, he won his first GIBBY Award for Defensive Player of the Year. The St. Louis chapter of the Baseball Writers' Association of America (BBWAA) named him the St. Louis Baseball Man of the Year for 2012. In a Los Angeles Times report that published the top MLB jersey sales from the All-Star break until October 1, his jersey ranked 18th.

==== 2013 ====
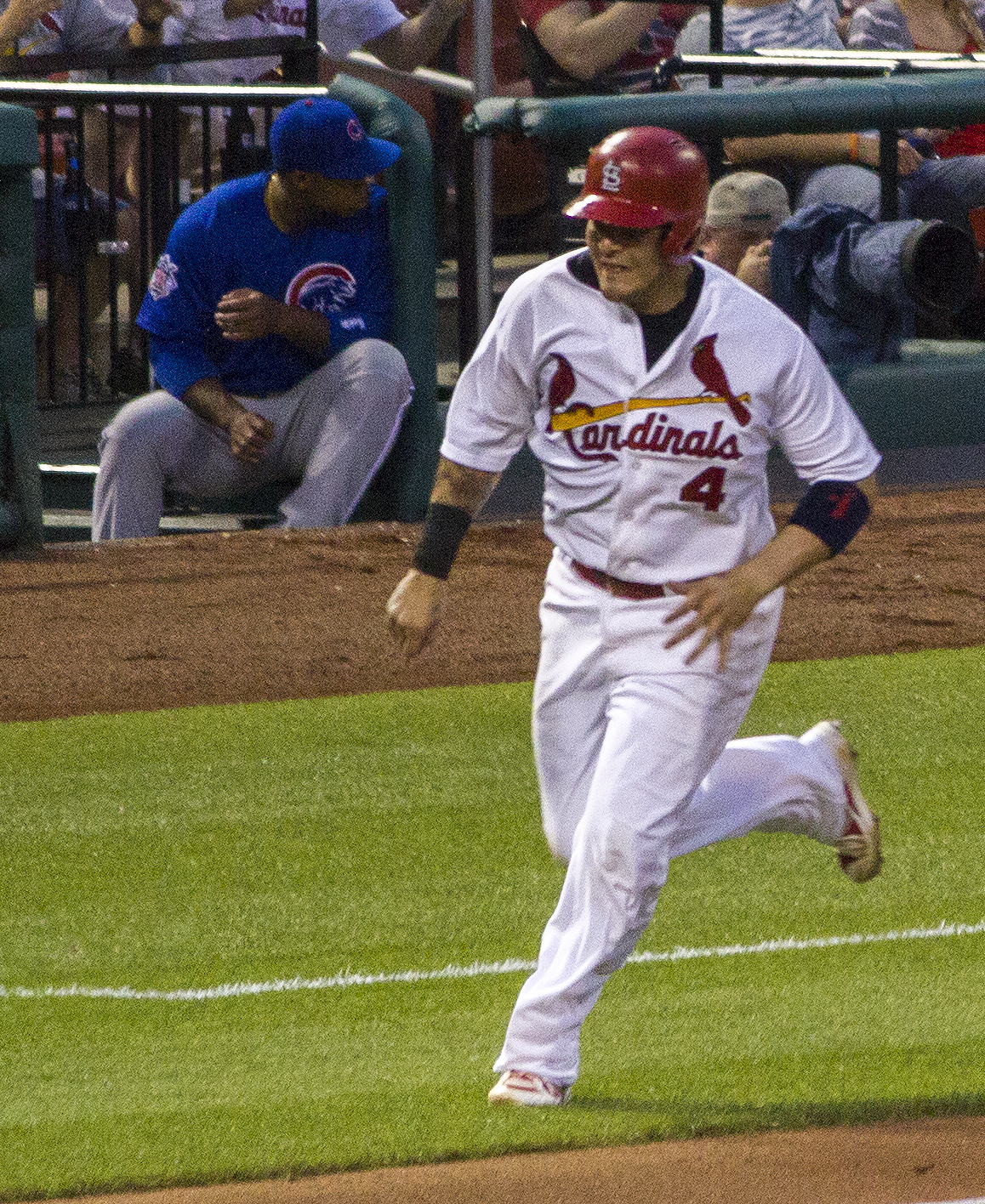
Molina rounding third in St. Louis in 2013

With increased profile coming in conjunction with his offensive breakout from the year before, Molina's popularity with fans around the game also increased. Following his 2012 fourth-place MVP finish, his 2013 in-season jersey sales rose to third place, just after Posey and retiring New York Yankees closer Mariano Rivera, according to a July 11 report. On June 2 he was ejected by 1st base umpire Clint Fagan for throwing his helmet after a long throw by San Francisco Giants shortstop Brandon Crawford resulted in him getting called out on a close play at 1st. Molina collected two doubles in a three-hit game on June 12, giving him 21 doubles for the season, a pre-All-Star break career high. It was also the second-highest pre-All-Star break total in franchise history following Ted Simmons' 29 thirty-five years earlier. That three-hit game also gave Molina 78 for his career, tied for 43 on the all-time list for catchers.

Through July 15, Molina led the NL with a .341 (110 hits in 323 at-bats) batting average. In the final All-Star Game balloting, Molina (6,883,258 votes) edged out Posey (6,474,088) for the role of the NL's starting catcher in the game held at Citi Field in Queens, New York City. The Cardinals placed Molina on the 15-day disabled list on July 31 due to a right knee sprain. At the time he went on the DL, Molina was batting .330 with eight homers, thirty doubles, and 54 RBIs. A magnetic resonance image (MRI) indicated inflammation but no structural damage, so the knee was drained of excess fluid buildup and Molina was given a cortisone injection.

The knee injury impacted his batting average, contributing to a late-season slump. On September 16, Molina collected four hits with three runs scored to help the Cardinals to a 12–2 win over the Seattle Mariners and break an 0–15 slump, raising his batting average to .317. Eight days later, Molina was behind the plate to call rookie Michael Wacha's one-hit, 8 2/3 innings of shutout work in a 2–0 victory over the Washington Nationals. It was actually a no-hitter through that point until Ryan Zimmerman broke it up with a high-bouncing ground ball that glanced off Wacha's glove for the Nationals' only hit of the game.

For the year, Molina set new career highs in batting average (.319), doubles (44), runs scored (68), and RBIs (80). He also hit .373 with runners in scoring position (RISP) in a season in which the Cardinals set the all-team team record for batting average with RISP at .330. He finished fourth in the NL in batting average, second in doubles and sixth in batting average with RISP. His 44 doubles were the most in the Major Leagues among catchers since Iván Rodríguez' 47 in 1996.

Molina was also noted for his handling of the pitching staff. The Cardinals overcame losing key pitchers Chris Carpenter, Jason Motte, and Jaime García – among others – early in the season by substituting twelve rookie pitchers en route to winning a competitive NL Central division title over the Pittsburgh Pirates and Cincinnati Reds (each team finished with at least 90 wins). A continuously evolving core exceeded expectations by filling in for 52 games started, 36 wins, and five saves and Molina was credited with their success in a large part due to his pitch-calling skills and aptness to guide. The rookies' 36 wins were the most in franchise history since 1941. (Note: A group of rookie pitchers including Shelby Miller, Trevor Rosenthal, Kevin Siegrist, Carlos Martínez, Seth Maness and Michael Wacha proved key to the Cardinals' 2013 Central division title run. Miller credited Molina's leadership behind the plate and preparation: "Yadi knows everything about every single hitter, exactly what to throw. If you execute your pitches and throw them where he wants the ball, you're going to get hitters out, have a better ERA, win the game. I seriously believe that all the success I've had is totally on him.")

The Cardinals squared off against the Pirates in the NLDS. Two weeks removed from just missing a no-hitter, Wacha again nearly repeated the feat with Molina behind the plate in an elimination game, Game 4. Molina threw out pinch runner Josh Harrison attempting to steal second base in the eighth inning to help the Cardinals preserve a 2–1 lead. In the World Series against the Boston Red Sox, Molina became just the ninth player – and the first in the expansion era – in franchise history to appear in four World Series with the club, and the first since Stan Musial in the 1946 World Series, also against the Red Sox. Molina collected more awards following the season, including his first Silver Slugger Award, sixth Gold Glove, and a third-place finish in MVP voting. Molina was a co-winner, along with Wainwright and Matt Carpenter, for the BBWAA St. Louis Baseball Man of the Year.

==== 2014 ====
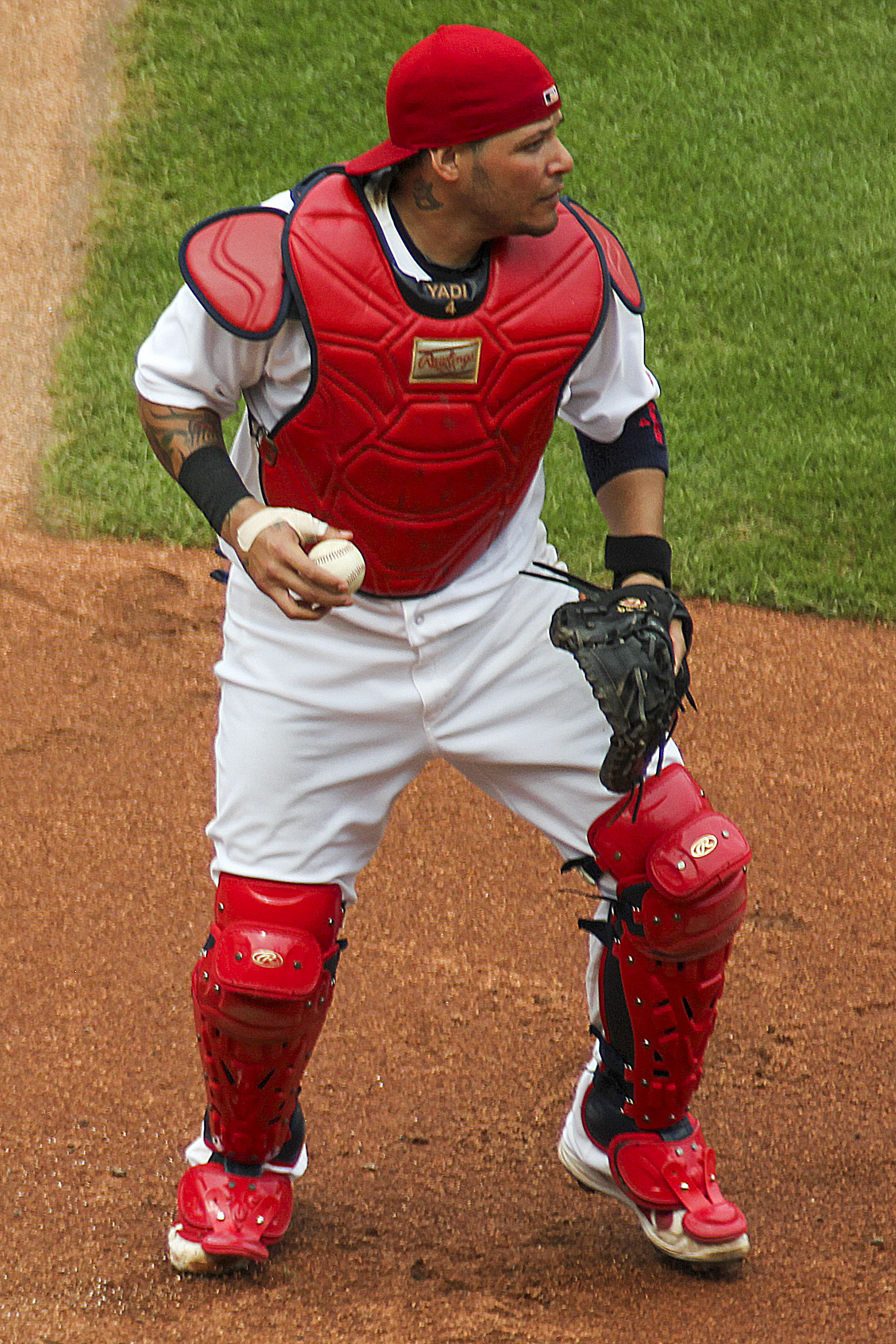
Molina in 2014

Along with three other players each separately displayed, Sports Illustrated featured Molina on the cover of their March 31 issue complementing the 2014 MLB season preview article. On the 2014 Opening Day – the same day Sports Illustrated published the Molina cover edition – he stroked his second season-entry home run and the 90th of his career, accounting for the difference in a 1–0 defeat of the Reds in Cincinnati. It also secured the 100th win for batterymate Adam Wainwright. Molina added a single for two of the Cardinals' five hits.

With a one ball, two strike pitch from relief pitcher Randy Choate incoming to Cubs outfielder Nate Schierholtz in a May 4 game, the batter foul tipped the pitch. Instead of Molina being in a position to catch it cleanly with his glove, the ball hit the thigh. Molina instantly hunched over the ball, trapping it between the thigh and rib cage. He held on, qualifying it as a third strike.

With the All-Star Game nearing, Brewers catcher Jonathan Lucroy aired a satirical television commercial in the style of a political advertising campaign on June 17 to outgain Molina in the All-Star voting totals. At that point, Molina led the vote total for NL catchers with more than two million, while Posey was second at 1.4 million and Lucroy third with 1.1 million.

Some, including Matheny, took the message literally. However, Brad Weimer, the advertisement's creator, confirmed the humor was meant to be tongue-in-cheek. Molina stayed in the lead and won the vote as the starting catcher in the All-Star Game at Target Field in Minneapolis, Minnesota, his sixth consecutive appearance.

His season was interrupted on July 9 against the Pirates. While sliding past third base, he attempted to grab the bag to stay on. However, during the play, he injured his right thumb. An MRI revealed torn ligaments, requiring surgery and forcing him to miss the next eight to 12 weeks. Regarding the injury as having a significance impact on the Cardinals' season, St. Louis Post-Dispatch sportswriter Bernie Miklasz commented, "Losing the best catcher in the world for the next 8 to 12 weeks with a torn thumb ligament is a horrendous, demoralizing setback for the Cardinals. This could be a season-ending injury." At that point, he was batting .287 with a .341 OBP, .409 SLG, 16 doubles, seven homers, and 30 RBIs through 83 games. He also led MLB with a 49 caught-stealing percentage.

He returned from the DL ahead of schedule, about seven weeks and 40 games missed after the injury, and was activated August 29 before a series against the Cubs. However, he still had not fully recovered, as he batted .250 in September with a pronounced drop in power production. His 110 appearances were his fewest since his rookie season in 2004. He finished the season with a .282 batting average, seven HR, 38 RBIs, 21 doubles, a .333 OBP and .386 SLG, all lower totals than 2013, and many since 2010. Among players with at least 90 games played, Molina's 48% caught stealing and 3.20 catcher's ERA were both first in the major leagues.

During Game 1 of the NLDS against the Dodgers, Wainwright hit Adrián González with a pitch, and both benches cleared. Umpire Jerry Meals attempted to get between González and Molina, but Molina briefly shoved Meals. MLB fined Molina $5,000 without suspending him. In Game 2 of the NLCS against the Giants, Molina collected his 89th career hit in the postseason, passing Pujols for the franchise record. However, he sustained his second significant injury of the season in that same game, straining his left abdominal oblique muscle during another at bat, due in part to compensation in his swing for lost power following his thumb injury earlier in the season.

After missing the next game, his string of 83 consecutive playoff games started was stopped, which was a major league record. The last playoff game he had not started was Game 3 of the 2004 World Series. On November 4, Molina was announced as winning his seventh consecutive Gold Glove, tying Boone as having won the third-most Gold Gloves among catchers. Further, only Bench and Rodríguez had won more consecutive (10 each) as catchers in major league history. He won the National League Platinum Glove award on November 8, his third time in the award's first four years.

==== 2015 ====
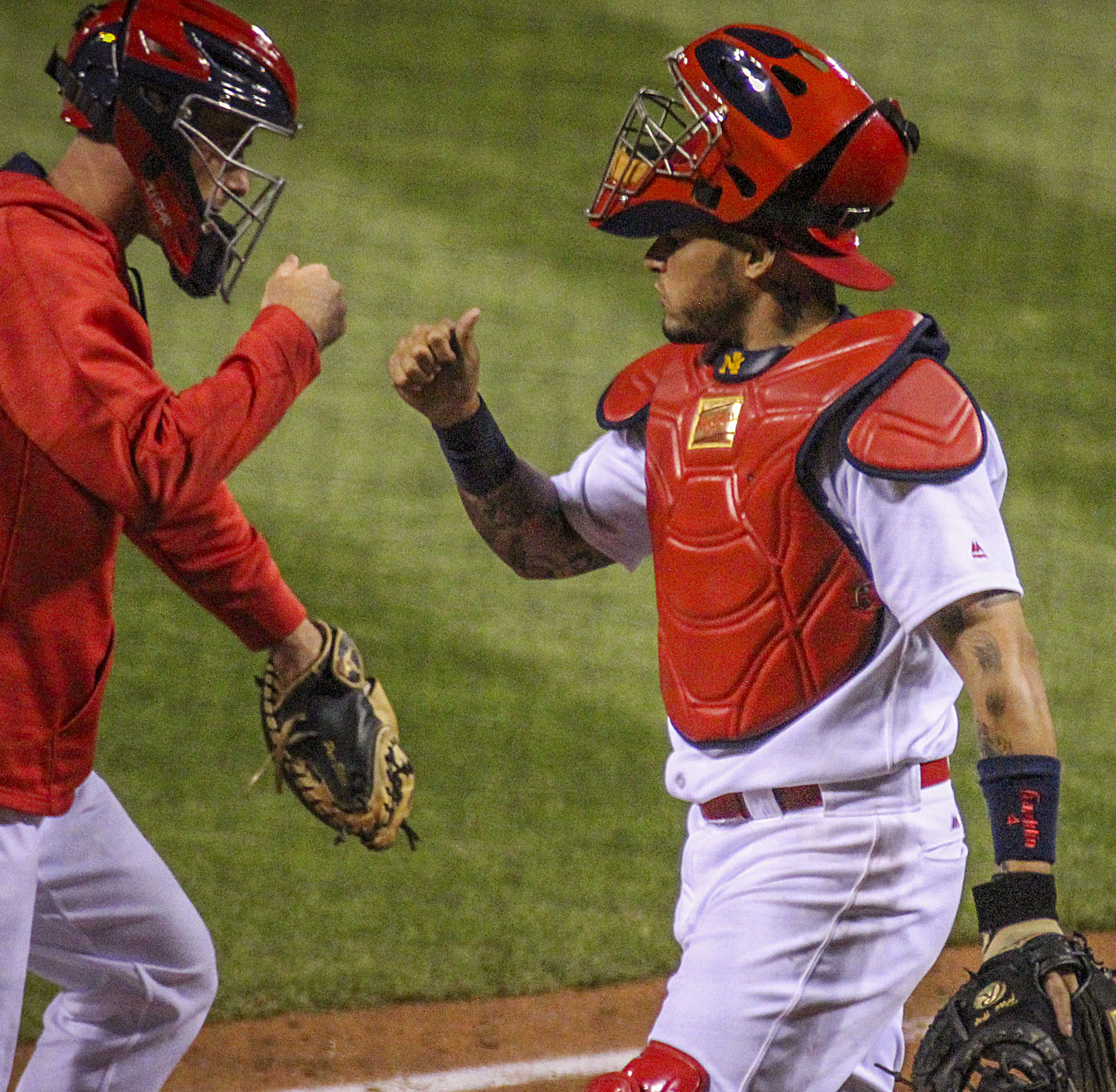
Yadi fist bumps the temporary catcher in 2016

With his 11th consecutive Opening Day start on April 5, 2015, against the Cubs, Molina became the first catcher in club history to achieve this feat. On May 10 against the Pirates, he was on the dubious end of a piece of MLB history: lining out into the first "4–5–4" (Note: A 4–5–4 play is a scenario involving the second baseman and third baseman. In the case of the triple play, the second baseman records an out, throws to the third baseman, who records a second out, and finally back to the second baseman, who records the third and final out of the inning, all in one play.) triple play in MLB history. Second baseman Neil Walker caught his line drive with two runners on, then threw to third baseman Jung-ho Kang to double up Jhonny Peralta for the second out. Kang briefly pirouetted the ball in his hand, albeit confused, but threw back to Walker to tag Jason Heyward for the third out. Molina's first home run of the season and first in 95 games occurred against the Minnesota Twins on June 15; his previous home run dated back to June 27, 2014.

On July 7, he was selected to his seventh consecutive All-Star Game, played at Great American Ball Park in Cincinnati. In the Reds' clubhouse for the All-Star Game, Molina shared a locker with Reds' second baseman Brandon Phillips. Since the brawl between the Cardinals and Reds in 2010, the two mended their schism, and Molina has a photograph of their families together. When informed whose locker he was using, Molina replied, "This is Phillips' locker? How about that? I'll have to write something to him." While the pregame roster introductions were made, Reds fans booed all six Cardinals players who were selected, and even former Cardinal Albert Pujols. When Molina was introduced, he smiled and turned and pointed his thumbs toward the back of his jersey. Pujols provided levity when he then joined in the booing. After the game, Molina remarked to reporters, "when you spend 12 years coming to Cincinnati and you beat them so many times, they're going to boo you." In his career to that point, he hit .319 with a .352 on-base percentage and .500 slugging percentage in 270 career at-bats at Great American Ball Park.

Hitting his first triple in more than four years and 2,000 at bats, with the bases loaded, Molina provided the decisive run in a 3–2 outcome against the Chicago White Sox on July 22. In the annual Baseball America Toolbox Awards, managers and coaches around the National League rated Molina as both the "Best hit and run artist" and "Best defensive catcher" in the NL. His 100th career home run was well-timed, becoming the game-winning run in the bottom of the eighth inning at Busch Stadium on August 19 in a 4–3 win over San Francisco. After sustaining an injury to his left thumb during a September 20 game against the Cubs, an MRI revealed a partial ligament tear, preventing him from playing. Molina won his eighth consecutive Gold Glove Award and fourth Platinum Glove Award in 2015. In December, it was revealed that Molina had a second surgery on his left thumb, pushing his return to late in 2016 spring training. He was winner of the Darryl Kile Good Guy Award.

==== 2016 ====
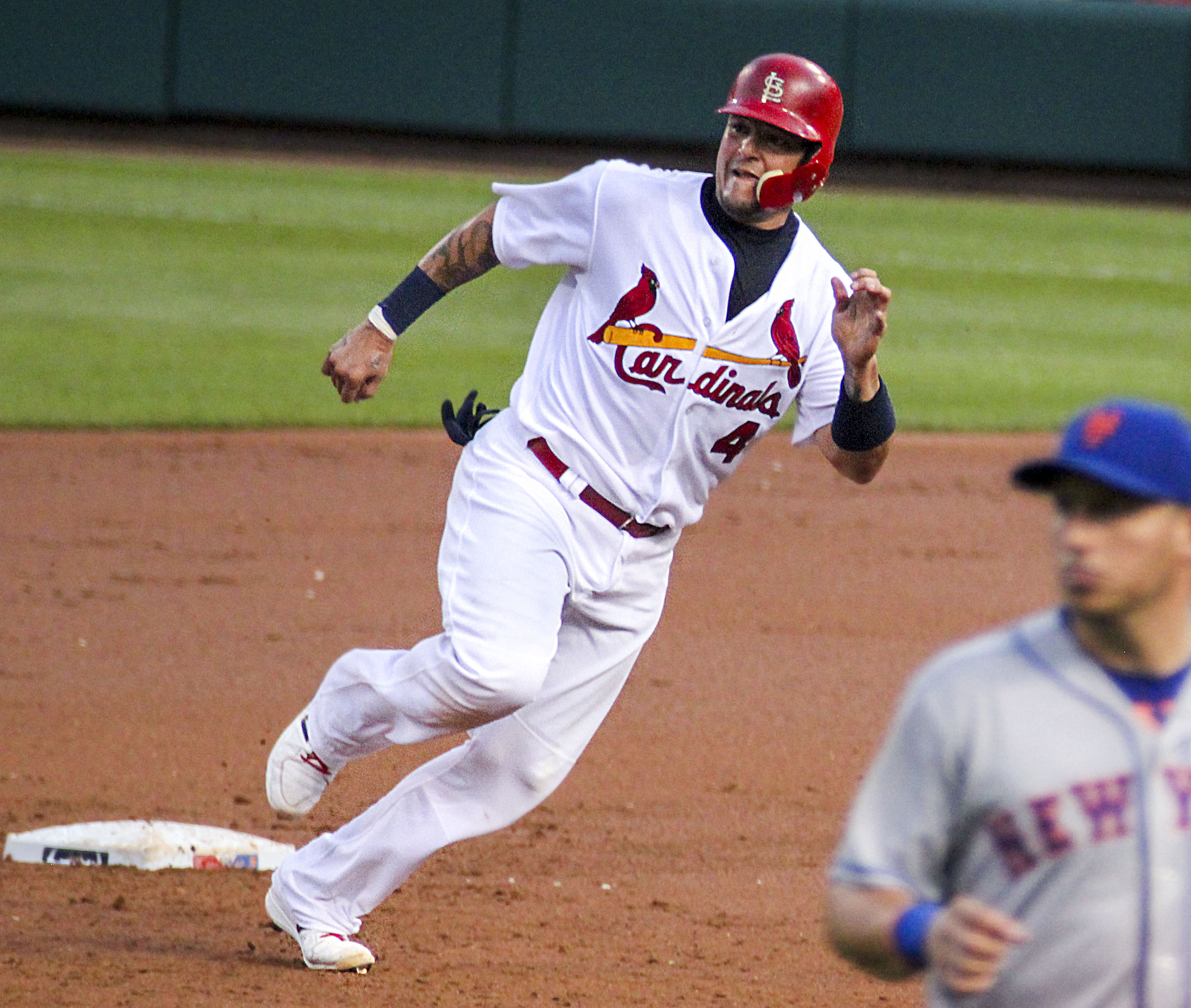
Molina digging for third in 2016.

At age 33, Molina broke the Cardinals' all-time games caught record on April 8, 2016, in his 1,440th game, passing Ted Simmons (1968–80). His 1,343 games started since the beginning of the 2005 season was the highest total in the major leagues. He made his 1,500th career major league appearance on May 14 in a 5–3 loss to the Los Angeles Dodgers. While playing the Washington Nationals in the seventh inning of a 2–1 loss at Nationals Park on May 26, Stephen Drew hit a high infield fly that stayed over the pitcher's mound. With both Aledmys Díaz and Mike Leake attempting to catch the ball, Molina posited himself and waited. As the ball deflected off Díaz' glove, he almost collided with Leake, but Molina instinctively moved his glove and caught the ball before it hit the ground. He recorded his 1,500th career hit on July 2 against Milwaukee, becoming the 34th catcher in MLB history, and second for the Cardinals, after Simmons.

Molina's ninth-inning, RBI double, tied the July 27 game against the New York Mets at 4−4, ending Jeurys Familia's consecutive-saves streak of 52, the third-longest in major league history. His tenth-inning double against Milwaukee on August 30, his 30th of the season and 300th of his career, helped lead the Cardinals to a 2–1 victory. He caught a career-high 146 games. After starting with a .256 average through 85 games, Molina batted .365 from July 8 to the end of the season, and overall hit .307, eight home runs, 58 RBIs, and led all major league catchers with 164 hits and 38 doubles. His hit total was also a career-high, leading the club, and he was eighth in the league in batting and ninth in doubles.

==== 2017 ====
During Spring Training before the 2017 season, and the final guaranteed year on Molina's contract, the Cardinals began to negotiate an extension to keep Molina in St. Louis for the remainder of his career. He agreed to a three-year contract extension for a reported $60 million, making him the highest-paid catcher in baseball. He was not interested in exercising his 2018 mutual option, which would have been worth $15 million. The extension assured Molina of remaining in St. Louis through 2020, and increases the chances that he will finish his career having played for just one organization, the one that drafted him. This distinction of having Molina retire as a Cardinal is something that carried weight for both parties throughout the negotiations.

On June 26, Molina became the ninth catcher all-time to record 11,000 career putouts at the position. For the eighth time in his career, he was an All-Star selection, as resulted in a vote by fellow players. He homered, making him the oldest catcher to hit a homer in an All-Star Game, in his age-34 season, and the first Cardinal to homer in an All-Star Game since Reggie Smith in 1974.

On August 9 against the Kansas City Royals, Molina came in with two outs and the bases loaded. After drawing a 1–0 count against Peter Moylan, a brief delay occurred when a stray kitten had made its way onto the outfield. On the very next pitch to Molina, he hit it 387 feet into the left field seats for a go-ahead grand slam. This was the fifth grand slam of his career, tying him with Tim McCarver for second-most career grand slams by a Cardinals catcher. This also proved to be the deciding hit in this game, as the Cardinals held up to win, 8–5.

On September 19, Molina tied Jim Bottomley (1922–1932) for 10th place in Cardinals history with 1,727 hits. Molina led the team in 2017 with 134 hits and 78 RBIs, and all NL catchers in both categories, entering play on that date. He broke the tie with Bottomley on September 20, with his 1,728th hit, and tied his own career-high RBI total for a season with 80, reached in 2013. He passed 80 on September 21, with his 81st and 82nd RBI. He was the 2017 recipient of the Missouri Athletic Club's Sports Personality of the Year Award.

==== 2018 ====
In January 2018, Molina expressed his plan to retire following the 2020 season when his contract would expire. As batterymates, Wainwright and Molina had accumulated more starts together than any other in franchise history. He passed Bench for two milestones early in the season: for 13th place in major league history in innings caught with 14,494 1/3 on April 14 while playing the Cincinnati Reds, and 16th in games caught versus with 1,743 on May 2 versus the Chicago White Sox. Molina doubled versus Cincinnati on April 22 to give him 338 for his career and tie Ozzie Smith for tenth place in Cardinals' history. On May 5, Molina exited the game after a foul tip struck him in the groin. The next day, on May 6, Molina underwent emergency surgery for a pelvic injury with traumatic hematoma.

The Cardinals activated Molina from the DL on June 5. On June 19, he set the major league record for most games caught with one team with 1,757, passing Gabby Hartnett who had previously held the record as a member of the Cubs. Molina homered twice in a loss to Philadelphia on June 20 for his fifth career multihomer game. He homered twice again on June 23 versus Milwaukee to fuel a 3–2 win, giving him five home runs over his previous six games.

Batting .279 with 13 home runs, Molina was named to the 2018 MLB All-Star Game to replace the injured Buster Posey. He finished his 2018 campaign batting .261 with twenty home runs and 74 RBIs in 123 games. He had the highest fielding percentage among major league catchers, at .998. He won his ninth Gold Glove.

==== 2019 ====
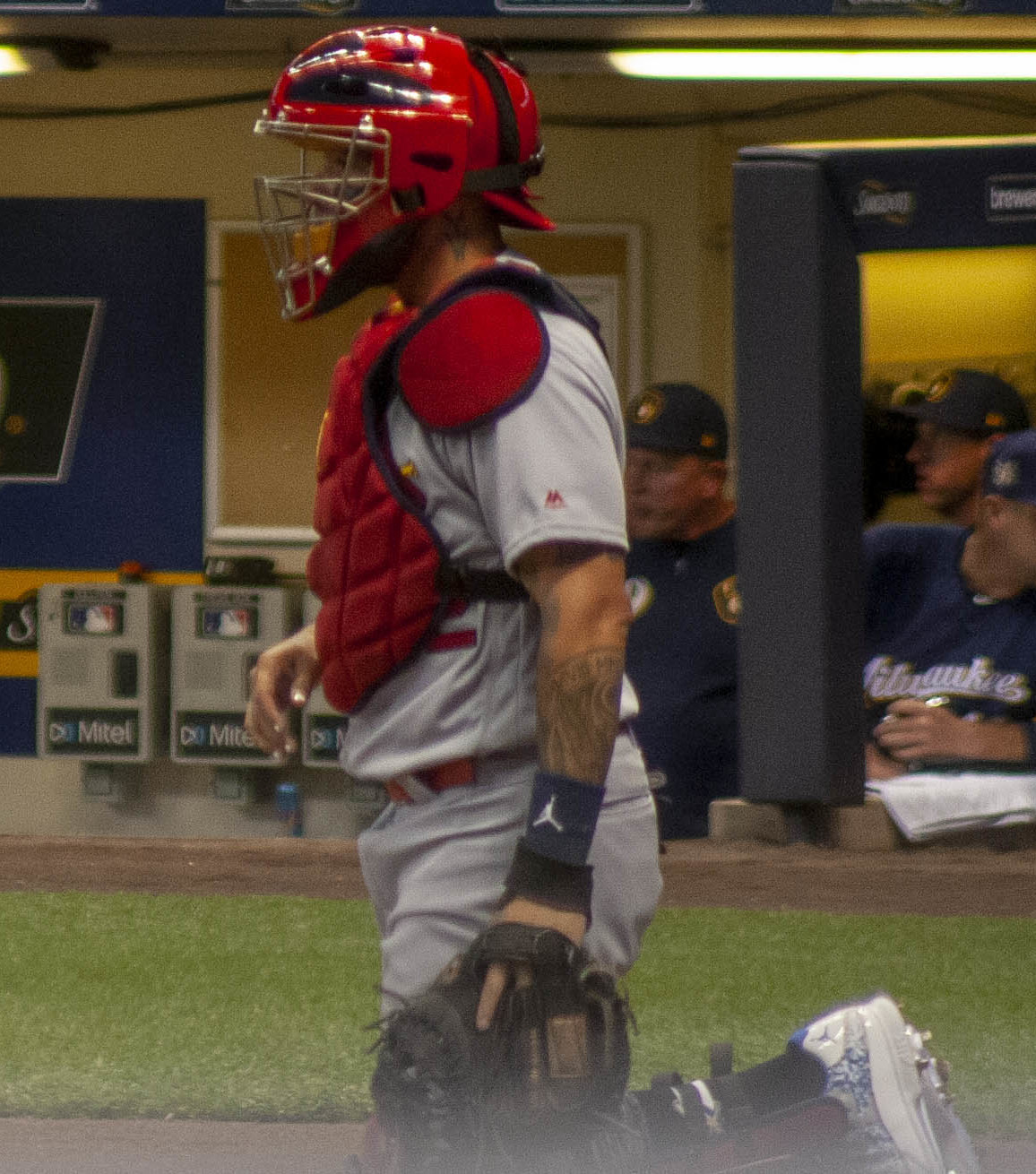
Molina catching in 2019

On Opening Day 2019, versus the Brewers, Molina extended his team-record for Opening Day starts with 15. He made his first career appearance at third base in extra innings of a 6−5 win on April 1 versus the Pirates. The Cardinals were in need of infield depth with an injury to regular utility infielder Jedd Gyorko. He was placed on the injured list on May 31 with a thumb tendon strain.

For the 2019 season, Molina batted .270/.312/.399 with ten home runs and 57 RBIs over 113 games. He batted .143 in the NLCS and .167 in the NLDS. He had the slowest sprint speed of all National League players, at 22.8 feet/second. On October 9, Molina set the record for the most appearances by a National League player in post-season MLB play, at ninety-four games. He was nominated for a Gold Glove.

==== 2020 ====
In 2020, Molina made his 16th consecutive Opening Day start. On August 4, it was announced that Molina had tested positive for COVID-19, and he was subsequently placed on the injured list. He returned from the injured list on August 20. On September 24, against the Milwaukee Brewers, he singled to right-center field for his 2,000th career hit.

For the season, he batted a slash line of .262/.303/.359, with four home runs and 16 RBIs. He was the second-oldest player in the NL, and had the slowest sprint speed of all major league catchers, at 23.0 feet per second. On defense, he led all NL catchers in errors, with five.

At the end of the 2020 season, Molina entered into free agency for the first time in his career.

==== 2021 ====
In 2021, Molina returned temporarily to Puerto Rico to play in the Liga de Béisbol Profesional Roberto Clemente to play as a reinforcement with the Atenienses de Manatí in the semifinals. However, his participation was shadowed by the poor performance of the team, resulting in a sweeping 4-0 series with the Indios de Mayagüez.

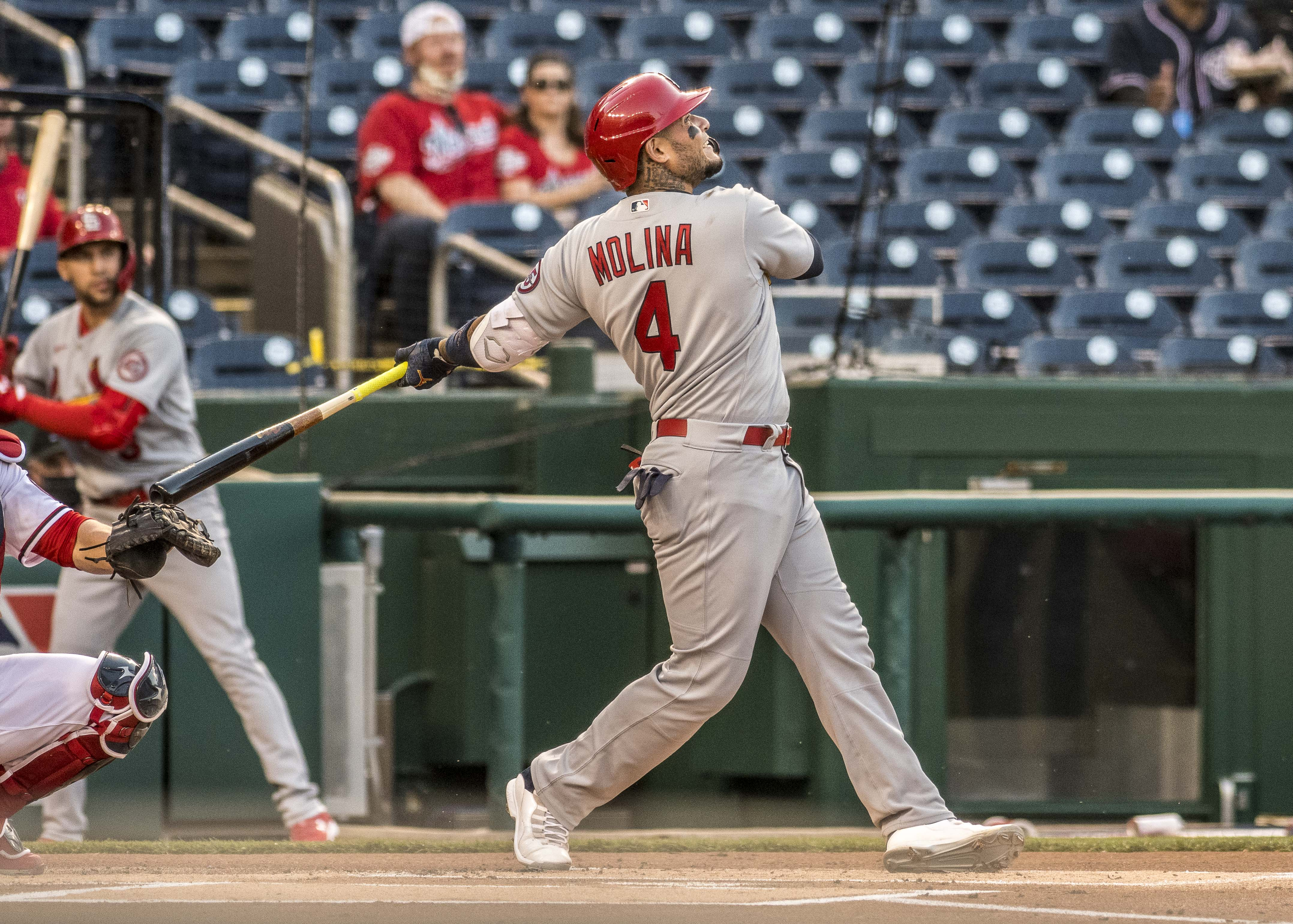
Molina batting against the Washington Nationals in April 2021

On February 8, 2021, the Cardinals announced that they had signed Molina to a one-year deal for a reported $9 million. In regards to the signing, Molina stated "this is my home" and "I'm happy to be back." On April 14, Molina caught his 2,000th game with the Cardinals, the most by a catcher on one team. On August 24, Molina signed a one-year extension worth $10 million and announced that 2022 would be his final season.

Molina finished the 2021 season batting .252/.297/.370 with 11 home runs and 66 RBIs over 121 games and again had the slowest sprint speed of all major league catchers, at 22.6 feet/second.–He was nominated for a Gold Glove, making him one of six Cardinals to be nominated which led the major leagues.

==== 2022 ====
On May 15, 2022, Molina and Adam Wainwright won their 203rd game as a starting battery, setting the MLB record. On May 22, Molina made his first career pitching performance as he closed an 18–4 win against the Pittsburgh Pirates. He gave up all four of the Pirates' runs on four hits and two home runs. His pitching debut came one week after that of teammate Albert Pujols, who also gave up four hits and two home runs in the ninth inning. On June 8, Molina came in to pitch again in the eighth inning of an 11-3 loss against the Tampa Bay Rays. In the mound appearance, Molina collected his first career pitching strikeout, punching out Rays infielder Isaac Paredes.

On September 14, Wainwright and Molina set another MLB record by starting alongside one another for the 325th time, surpassing Mickey Lolich and Bill Freehan of the Detroit Tigers for the most starts by a battery in MLB history. His last game was played on October 8, 2022, as the Cardinals were beaten 2–0 in the 2022 Wild Card Series by the Philadelphia Phillies. He went one for four and left two runners on base.

In 2022 he batted .214/.233/.302 in 262 at bats, and was the slowest player in major league baseball, with a sprint speed of 21.8 feet per second.

== International career ==
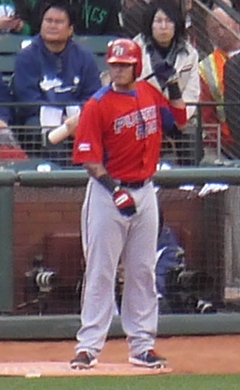
Molina batting for the Puerto Rico national team in the 2013 World Baseball Classic.

Molina played in the first four World Baseball Classic (WBC) tournaments – 2006, 2009, 2013, and 2017 – for Puerto Rico. He was fellow defensive standout Iván Rodríguez's backup in 2006 and 2009 and the primary catcher for the 2013 and 2017 squads.

In his first tournament in 2006, Molina played four games and collected three hits in five at-bats. In a 2009 game against the Netherlands on March 9, Molina's eighth-inning double keyed a rally in which Puerto Rico won 3–1. Speaking the next day, Molina stated that the previous night's double had been a bigger thrill than his two-run homer to beat the Mets in Game 7 of the 2006 NLCS.

With Molina as the starting catcher in 2013, Puerto Rico earned the silver medal. Edwin Rodríguez, who had scouted Molina in Puerto Rico before the Cardinals signed him, became the manager for the 2013 squad. Shortly after learning he would be the manager, Rodríguez contacted Molina for input on constructing the roster. Molina prepared for the Classic by playing 14 games for the winter league team in Puerto Rico Rodríguez managed. Molina was voted on the All-World Baseball Classic team for the first time.

In a 2013 semifinal game against Japan, Molina alertly took advantage of a baserunning mistake to record an unusual putout. With Shinnosuke Abe batting for Japan in the top of the eighth inning, and Hirokazu Ibata on second and Seiichi Uchikawa on first, J. C. Romero was pitching for Puerto Rico. Abe took a pitch from Romero inside for a ball as the runners went in motion. However, Ibata retreated to second as Uchikawa charged toward him. Instead of throwing and risking an error, Molina held on to the ball. He then chased Uchikawa, cornered him by positioning himself between first and second and tagged out Uchikawa – an unassisted caught stealing. The Japanese later stated they were attempting to exploit Romero's slow delivery.

Puerto Rico advanced the finals again in 2017, falling to the United States 8−0 in earning their second consecutive silver medal and only loss of the tournament. Molina made a strong case to be named Most Valuable Player (MVP) of the entire tournament, batting .333 with two home runs and a .583 slugging percentage in six games. After collecting three hits and a home run in eight at bats over two games in Pool F competition, he was named that group's MVP. In the semifinal game against the Netherlands, he picked two runners off base in one inning. He was named the catcher of 2017 All-World Baseball Classic team, his second All-WBC honor. Also, the coaching staff often allowed him to conduct the preparation meetings, took his advice on construction of the starting rotation, and when to remove tiring pitchers.

On September 10, 2018, he was selected to be part of the 2018 MLB Japan All-Star Series as a member of the MLB All-Stars team.

== Coaching career ==
Molina's first experience managing was with Puerto Rico's U-23 baseball team, in both the qualifiers for and actual tournament of the 2018 U-23 Baseball World Cup. Puerto Rico dropped its first three games to the Dominican Republic, Venezuela, and South Korea, preventing it from moving on in the tournament. However, Molina managed the team to four more victories in the group stage and consolation round.

In 2022, Molina announced that he would be managing the Navegantes del Magallanes in the Venezuelan Professional Baseball League, having been recruited by former major leaguer Pablo Sandoval. Molina said the opportunity could open the door to managing a team in MLB, saying that Navegantes was "something different, and I'd like to try it early and see how it goes. And then after, I can decide if I want to do it [in the United States]." He managed Magallanes to a 29–27 regular season finish, though they were eliminated in the playoff round-robin.

Also in 2022, Molina was announced as manager of the Puerto Rico national team for the 2023 World Baseball Classic. The appointment created some controversy in Puerto Rico after the resignation of team general manager Eduardo Pérez, who had reportedly wanted Astros bench coach Joe Espada to manage the team. Puerto Rico was placed in Pool D, the so-called "group of death," along with Venezuela and the Dominican Republic. At the tournament, Molina managed Puerto Rico to eight perfect innings against Israel, as well as a 5–2 upset victory over the Dominican Republic to decide which team moved on to the knockout stage. However, Puerto Rico was eliminated by Mexico in the quarterfinals.

Molina managed the Criollos de Caguas to the 2023–24 Roberto Clemente Professional Baseball League title in Puerto Rico, as well as at the 2024 Caribbean Series. He returned to manage Navegantes in the 2025–26 LVBP season, following the departure of Eduardo Pérez. At the time of his appointment, Magallanes was in last place; he led the team to a 20-12 record and finished the season in third, one game behind the leader. He was awarded Manager of the Year honors. Molina led the team to its 14th championship, defeating the Caribes de Anzoátegui in six games.

On January 21, 2026, the St. Louis Cardinals hired Molina to serve as a special assistant to president of baseball operations Chaim Bloom.

== Playing style ==
=== Defense, pitch calling, throwing, and hands ===
The winner of eight consecutive Gold Gloves, Molina was widely praised for his preparation, defense and leadership, not just of the pitching staff, but also of the entire team, even from Johnny Bench. Fellow catchers Jorge Posada and Brian McCann said in 2009 that Molina was the best defensive catcher in baseball. Víctor Martínez also called him "the best behind the plate." In 2013, a scout pronounced Molina the "one piece the St. Louis Cardinals cannot lose" while another commented that he was "irreplaceable." When the club did lose Molina midway through the 2014 season to a thumb injury, ESPN's Keith Law tweeted, "Yadier Molina missing two-plus months would be bad for the Cardinals, but also just bad for baseball, period." In his time in the major leagues, Molina was widely viewed as evolving into a competitive influence and an unofficial on-field coach.

As a part of his pre-game preparation, Molina would meticulously study and prepare for the upcoming game's opposing hitters by creating a complete pitching and defensive plan. Other preparation included handling ground balls at shortstop and third base, extending his agility for blocking pitches thrown in the dirt. Former Cardinals starter Jake Westbrook said he was "a part of every aspect of the game: starters, relievers, offense, defense."

Advanced baseball analysis, also called sabermetrics, show Molina to be one of the best defending catchers in MLB history. Molina ranked second all-time among catchers as of the end of the 2024 season on Baseball Reference's career defensive total zone runs, behind only Iván Rodríguez and just ahead of Jim Sundberg, Bob Boone, and Gary Carter. Molina also ranked as one of the best 15 defenders at any position. Molina led NL catchers in total zone runs 8 times in his career, from 2005 to 2017. Fangraphs assessed Molina's defense even better, ranking him second all time in defensive wins above replacement, just behind fellow Cardinal Ozzie Smith. According to the Fielding Bible's defensive runs saved, Molina saved 186 runs in his career, with a career-high of 30 in 2013.

"You don't ever have to worry about bouncing a ball to Yadier. He's a human vacuum behind the plate. The only thing you have to think about is making the pitch, because you know Yadi's going to catch whatever you throw."

— Cardinals starting pitcher Adam Wainwright

Molina was known for his in-game pitch-calling skills, and pitchers rarely rejected signs that he showed for the next pitch. In 2013, Matheny said, "We tell all our young pitchers when they come up to pitch their game. Yadi needs to find out how they work. He's a quick study. But at the same time, they tend to just follow him. We do put them in Yadi's hands." Molina read opposing hitters and would move fielders with subtle signs and gestures to align them with his pitch calling. La Russa said that "it's not just instinct. It's sense, based on how a hitter's standing, how he responds to the pitch or two before, and he's very creative in how he makes his adjustment based on what he sees with the hitter and knowing what his pitcher can do."

"During the course of games, he would do something and I'd go, 'I can't believe he did that.' But it worked. His pitch calling, sometimes you're thinking he's doing something so out of the norm, yet it was the right thing to do at the time."

— Dave Duncan, on Molina to Sports Illustrated in 2013

Baseball Prospectus estimated that Molina saved 35 defensive runs in the 2012 season through his pitch framing.

Molina was among the best in the game at throwing out baserunners with pickoffs and during steal attempts. He threw out 40% of attempted basestealers, leading the NL four times. He studied baserunners to learn how they decide when and whether to attempt a steal and when they were less guarded against a pickoff. He practiced pickoff moves and coordinates signals with the first basemen to indicate when he was primed to move for a pickoff throw. Molina threw from behind left-handed batters to obfuscate the runner's view of his motion to first base. In 2012, a Sports Illustrated poll of 306 players found that Molina was the "toughest catcher to run on." An Arizona Diamondbacks official said team policy was not to run on Molina.

=== Batting ===
As the website Viva El Birdos wrote, "Yadier Molina broke into the majors as a light-hitting defensive specialist", who hit mostly singles. Molina pushed to shed the light-hitter label he had in common with his brothers. A fidgeter with his batting stance early in his career, Molina mimicked and vacillated between more accomplished hitters such as Andrés Galarraga and Albert Pujols. However, it was a dip in his swing and an inability to get around on fastballs that sapped his efforts. Over time, with assistance of teammates such as Pujols, Molina found his comfortable stance, sounder mechanics and adopted a line-drive style of swing that eliminated the dip and helped him hit fastballs with more authority.

Thus, he became a more consistent hitter as his career progressed, defying the scouting reports that he would have a weak bat. In combination with an improved ability to pull the ball and hit it up the middle, he improved his batting average, batting .293 or higher from 2008 to 2013. His line-drive pull percentage of 2009–11 increased by about 6% in 2012–13; his batting average on balls in play increased from .280 in 2005–10 to .327 in 2011–13; and his weighted on-base average (wOBA) (Note: Designed to rate a player's overall batting production by assigning different weights to certain outcomes, wOBA takes into account singles, doubles, triples, home runs, hit by pitches, and unintentional walks. wOBA is based on the philosophy Tango developed that not all outcomes are proportionally weighted. Unlike slugging percentage, which assigns one base for a single, two for a double, etc., or on-base plus slugging, which assumes that one base for slugging is equal to one walk, wOBA attempts to measure the impact of each event in terms of their run-scoring value. Further, wOBA finds that OBP is 1.8 times more valuable than slugging percentage. The weight of each outcome also varies from season to season.) increased from .290 in 2009 to over .520 in 2013. To keep his bat in the lineup but allow respite from the rigors of his in-game catching duties, Molina has occasionally started at first base.

Aside from swinging with increased line-drive contact and hitting fastballs with more authority, very little has actually changed in the catcher's approach. One trait that always persisted throughout his career was Molina's aggressive and free-swinging — but high-contact — batting style. Through 2012, he swung at more than 51% percent of the pitches he saw — he has a reputation for swinging at pitches in and out of the strike zone, low and away and even in toward his hands. Because of his free-swinging tendency, he naturally had a walk rate (6.3%) below the major league average (8.3%). Combined with his ability to put the bat on the ball quite frequently (87%) and his improved approach at the plate, he increased his career-high single-season batting average five times between 2006 and 2013.

Despite batting just .238 in his first three seasons and .240 after 1,000 at-bats, Molina increased his average to .285 average through 2016. He also improved his power, hitting a career high 22 home runs in 2012 and 44 doubles the following season. His hitting diminished toward the end of his career, batting .258 in his final six seasons. His ability to get on base was hampered by his low walk rate and footspeed; he was consistently one of the slowest runners in baseball in his final seven seasons.

== Awards and accomplishments ==
Championships earned or shared
Title	Times	Dates	References
National League champion	4	2004, 2006, 2011, 2013	
World Series champion	2	2006, 2011	

Awards, honors, and exhibition team selections	Times	Dates	References
All-World Baseball Classic Team	2	2013, 2017	
Baseball America Toolbox Award for Best Defensive Catcher	2	2014, 2015	
Baseball Writers' Association of America St. Louis Baseball Man of the Year	2	2012, 2013	
The Cardinal Nation/Scout.com St. Louis Cardinals Player of the Year	2	2012, 2013	
Darryl Kile Good Guy Award	1	2015	
Fielding Bible Award at catcher	6	2007−10, 2012, 2013	
GIBBY/This Year in Baseball Award for Defensive Player of the Year	2	2012, 2013	
MLB All-Star	10	2009−15, 2017–18, 2021	
MLB Japan Series All-Star	1	2018	
Rawlings Gold Glove Award at catcher	9	2008−15, 2018	
Rawlings Platinum Glove Award	4	2011, 2012, 2014, 2015	
Roberto Clemente Award	1	2018	
Silver Slugger Award at catcher	1	2013	
The Sporting News National League All-Star at catcher	1	2009	
Wilson Cardinals' Defensive Player of the Year	2	2012, 2013	
World Baseball Classic silver medalist (with Puerto Rico)	2	2013, 2017	

=== Records ===
MLB records

- Consecutive playoff games started, 83
- Career leader in putouts by a catcher, 15,122

St. Louis Cardinals records

- Consecutive Opening Day starts at catcher, 15 (2005–19)
- Consecutive seasons leading the team in batting average as catcher, 2
- Gold Gloves won as catcher, 9
- Total zone runs as catcher, 163
- Playoff appearances as catcher, 8
- Career postseason hits, 102

=== Statistical Achievements ===
Category	# of Times	Dates
All National League players
Defensive Wins Above Replacement (dWAR)	6	2006, 2007, 2009, 2010, 2012, 2013
Wins Above Replacement (WAR)	1	2012
National League top-five fielding leader as catcher
Assists	8 (**3**)	2005−**10**, **2012**, 2013
Caught stealing	7	2005−07, 2010, 2012, 2015, 2017
Caught stealing percentage	10 (**4**)	**2005**−**10**, 2012−15
Double plays	6 (**3**)	2010, **2012**−**15**, **2017**
Errors	3	2005, 2008, 2017
Fielding percentage	7 (**2**)	2006, 2009, 2010, 2012−**14**, **2016**
Games played	9 (**6**)	2006, **2009**−**13**, **2015**−**17**
Passed balls	4 (**1**)	**2005**, 2006, 2010, 2016
Putouts	7 (**3**)	2009, 2010, 2012, **2013**, **2015**, **2016**, 2017
Stolen bases allowed	1	2016
Total zone runs	12 (**7**)	**2005**−15, 2017
National League top-ten batting leader
At bat-to-strikeout ratio	8	2008−13, 2015, 2016
Adjusted OPS	1	2012
Batting average	4	2011−13, 2016
Doubles	2	2013, 2016
Double plays grounded into	6	2007−11, 2016
Offensive WAR	1	2012
Sacrifice flies	2	2015, 2017
Notes: **Bold** — league leader. Per Baseball-Reference.com.

== Personal life ==
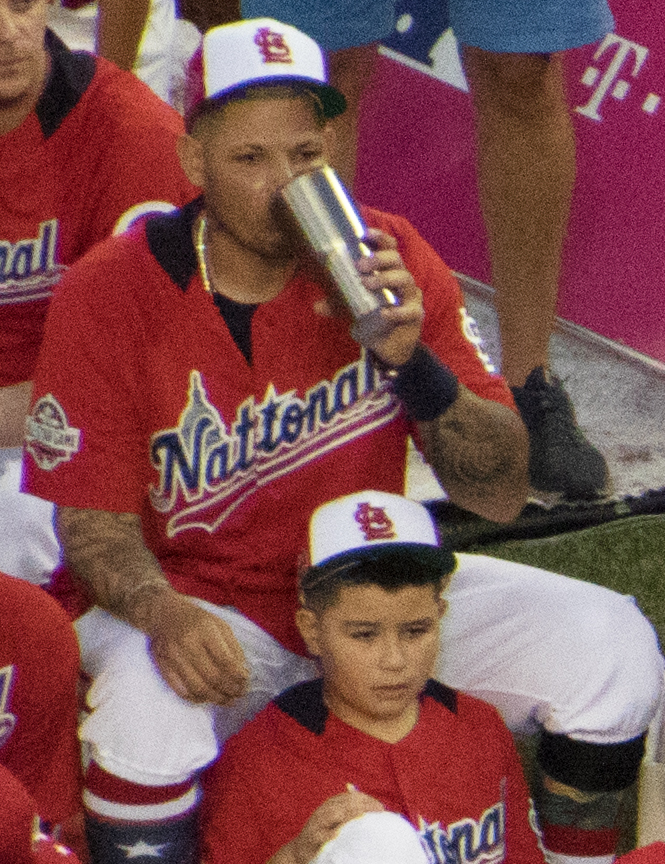
Molina with his older son at the 2018 Major League Baseball Home Run Derby

Molina resides in Vega Alta and stayed in Caseyville, Illinois, during the baseball season until 2015. He then purchased a home in Creve Coeur, Missouri. Molina also owned a home in Jupiter, Florida, the home of the Cardinals spring training facilities, but sold it in 2020.

Molina married his wife Wanda Torres in 2007 and the couple have three children. On September 4, 2008, they had a son; on July 4, 2010, a daughter; and on February 6, 2016, another son. After signing his $75 million contract in 2012, Molina purchased a home on a four-acre property in Jupiter, Florida, for $7.15 million. His agent is Melvin Roman of MDR Sports Management, who has represented him since he signed his first professional contract with the Cardinals shortly after being drafted in 2000. Molina's charitable organization, named Foundation 4, has helped to raise donations for childhood cancer patients in Puerto Rico. Molina is an avid fan of the St. Louis Blues and attends games frequently. He is close friends with Vladimir Tarasenko.

Molina's two older brothers, Bengie and José Molina, played a combined 28 seasons in the major leagues. Each of the three brothers has won at least one World Series ring, making them the only trio of brothers with such a distinction (Bengie and José both won their first while with the Anaheim Angels in 2002). They are also the only trio of brothers to play as catchers in the major leagues. Of a total of 19 trios of brothers who have played in the major leagues — including the DiMaggios and the Cruzes — only one other trio of brothers has all appeared in a World Series: Matty, Félipe, and Jesús Alou.

Even while the Molina brothers still lived in the United States playing professional baseball, their parents stayed in the same home near the park where the brothers grew up playing ball, Jesús Rivera Park. Benjamín Molina organized youth teams. On October 11, 2008, Molina's father died from a heart attack. At the moment it occurred, he was tending to a baseball field that he had built for the youth in Bayamón.

Spurred by absences from autograph shows for which he was paid to appear, Steiner Sports Marketing filed a lawsuit for $175,000 against Molina in the New York state supreme court in Manhattan on October 2, 2009. Steiner Sports allegedly paid him $90,640 in advance when they renewed their contract with him in July 2008. The firm stated that he ignored their agreement to make public and private appearances to sign autographs and did not return the money.

After Hurricane Maria devastated the island of Puerto Rico in September 2017, Molina and his wife started a GoFundMe page for the victims on September 21 with a goal of $1 million. It raised $20,000 in the first seven hours. More than three million Puerto Ricans were left without power, and The New York Times had reported that over 95% of cell service was unavailable. Drone video coverage on The Weather Channel described Bayamon as looking "like a war zone". Continuing with relief efforts, Molina was consequently named the recipient of the annual Roberto Clemente Award on October 24, 2018.

On June 7, 2026, Molina and his family were scheduled to fly from Texas in a Gulfstream G200 jet for a visit to Puerto Rico when the plane crashed at the La Romana International Airport in the Dominican Republic, killing pilot Erick Javier Diago and co-pilot Ruddy Ghazal. Molina shared his condolences with the families of the deceased on Instagram.

== See also ==
- List of Major League Baseball career assists as a catcher leaders
- List of Major League Baseball career games played as a catcher leaders
- List of Major League Baseball career hits leaders
- List of Major League Baseball career putouts as a catcher leaders
- List of Major League Baseball players from Puerto Rico
- List of Major League Baseball players who spent their entire career with one franchise
- List of Puerto Ricans
- List of St. Louis Cardinals team records
- St. Louis Cardinals award winners and league leaders
