= List of Major League Baseball career games played as a catcher leaders =

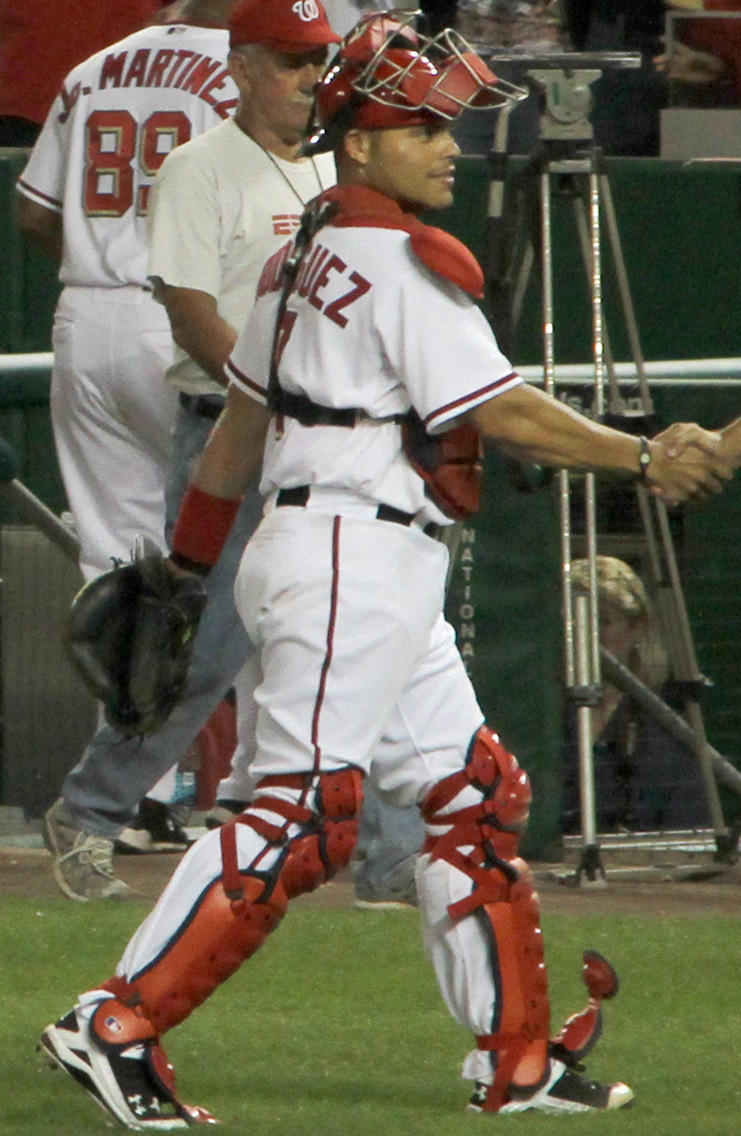
Iván Rodríguez, the all-time leader in games played as a catcher

Games played (most often abbreviated as G or GP) is a statistic used in team sports to indicate the total number of games in which a player has participated (in any capacity); the statistic is generally applied irrespective of whatever portion of the game is contested. In baseball, the statistic applies also to players who, prior to a game, are included on a starting lineup card or are announced as ex ante substitutes, whether or not they play; however, in Major League Baseball, the application of this statistic does not extend to consecutive games played streaks. A starting pitcher, then, may be credited with a game played even if he is not credited with a game started or an inning pitched. The catcher is a position for a baseball or softball player. When a batter takes his/her turn to hit, the catcher crouches behind home plate, in front of the (home) umpire, and receives the ball from the pitcher. In addition to these primary duties, the catcher is also called upon to master many other skills in order to field the position well. The role of the catcher is similar to that of the wicket-keeper in cricket. In the numbering system used to record defensive plays, the catcher is assigned the number 2.

Because catching is generally regarded as the most grueling position in baseball, catchers have historically played fewer games than any other non-pitching position; it is still unusual for a player to catch all of their team's games for even a month. Only eight players in history have caught in all of their team's games over the course of a season; five of those achieved the feat in the 19th century, when the seasons were generally much shorter, and the other three did so during World War II, when player availability was sharply limited. Prior to 1944, only seven players caught 145 games in a season, none more than once. When Bob Boone became the first player to catch 2,000 major league games in 1988, it was over a quarter century after every other non-pitching position had seen a player reach that milestone. But in recent decades, the workload of top major league catchers has gradually increased, and the top ten career leaders all made their major league debuts after 1968.

Iván Rodríguez is the all-time leader in games played as a catcher, playing 2,427 games at the position. Carlton Fisk (2,226), Bob Boone (2,225), Yadier Molina (2,184), Gary Carter (2,056) and Jason Kendall (2,025) are the only other players to play 2,000 or more games as a catcher. Molina, of the St. Louis Cardinals, is the only player to catch 2,000 games with one team.

== Key ==
**Rank**	Rank amongst leaders in career games caught. A blank field indicates a tie.
**Player (2026 Gs)**	Number of games played during the 2026 Major League Baseball season
**MLB**	Total career games played as a catcher in Major League Baseball
*	Denotes elected to National Baseball Hall of Fame
**Bold**	Denotes active player (Note: A player is considered inactive if he has announced his retirement or has not played for a full season.)

== List ==
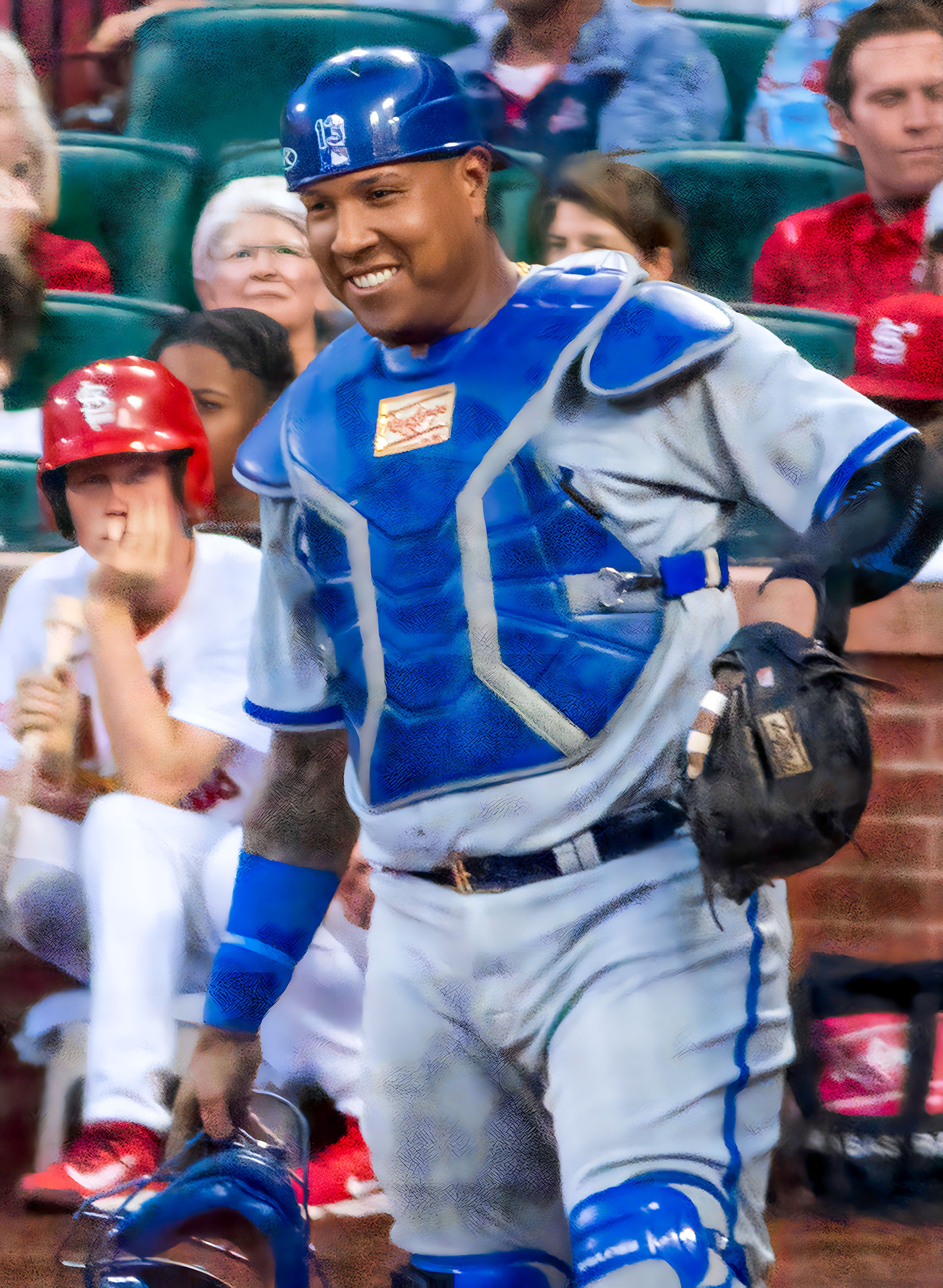
Salvador Perez, the active leader in career games played as a catcher and 42nd all-time.

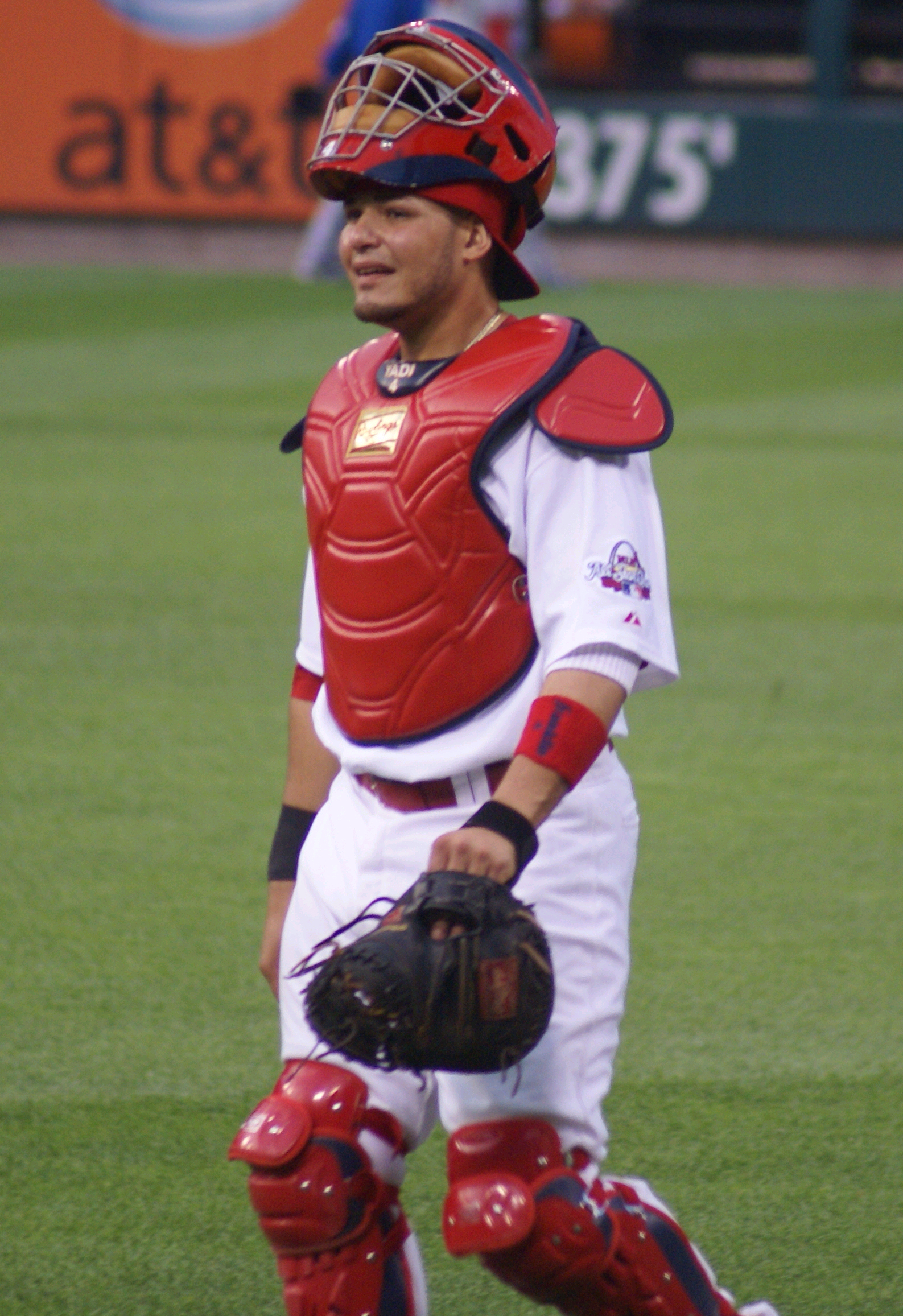
Yadier Molina holds the National League career record.

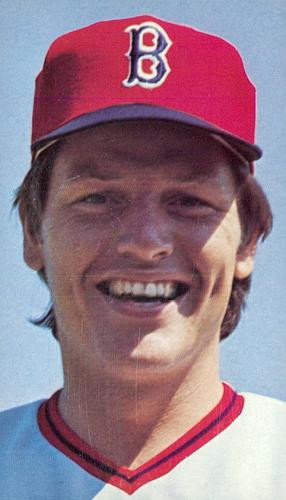
Carlton Fisk holds the American League career record.

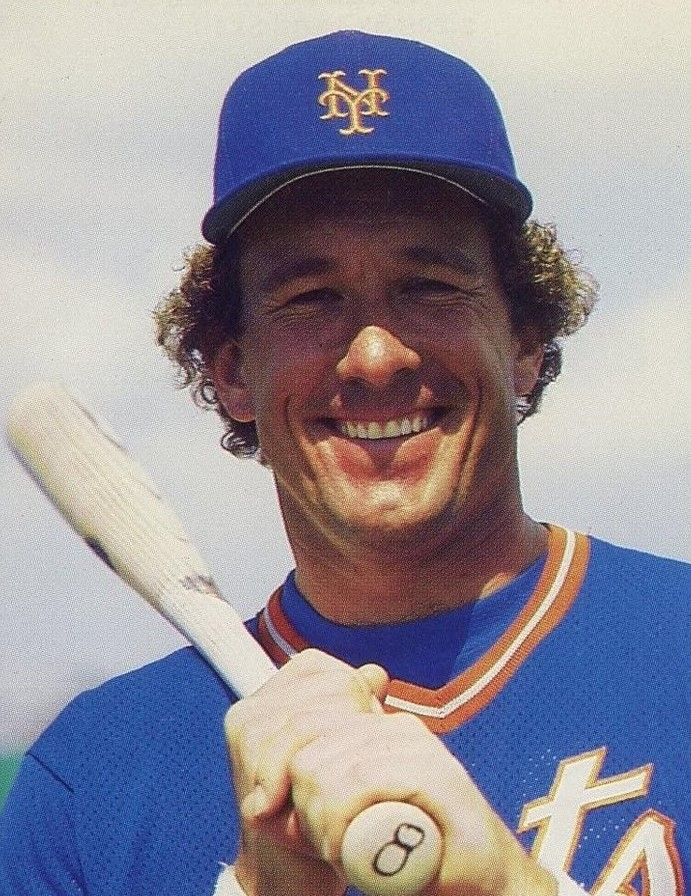
Gary Carter held the National League record for 31 years.

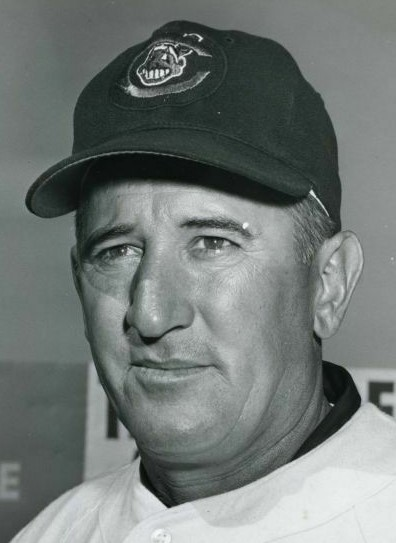
Al López held the major league record for 42 years.

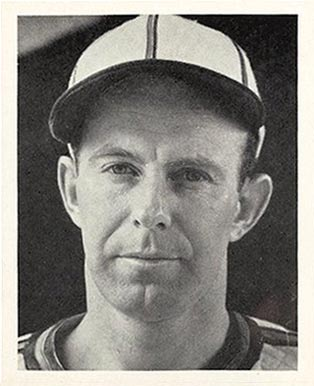
Rick Ferrell held the American League record for 43 years.

- Stats updated as of September 27, 2026.

Rank	Player (2026 Gs)	Games as catcher			Other leagues, notes
Rank	Player (2026 Gs)	MLB	American League	National League	Other leagues, notes
1	Iván Rodríguez*	2,427	2,060	367	
2	Carlton Fisk*	2,226	2,226	0	Held major league record, 1993–2009
3	Bob Boone	2,225	1,130	1,095	Held major league record, 1987–1993
4	Yadier Molina	2,184	0	2,184	
5	Gary Carter*	2,056	0	2,056	Held National League record, 1990–2021
6	Jason Kendall	2,025	486	1,539	
7	Tony Peña	1,950	767	1,183	
8	Brad Ausmus	1,938	350	1,588	
9	A. J. Pierzynski	1,936	1,624	312	
10	Jim Sundberg	1,927	1,850	77	Holds AL single-season record of 155 (tied record in 1975)
11	Al López*	1,918	57	1,861	Held major league record, 1945–1987; held NL record, 1945–1990
12	Benito Santiago	1,917	159	1,758	
13	Lance Parrish	1,818	1,536	282	
14	Rick Ferrell*	1,806	1,806	0	Held American League record, 1945–1988
15	Gabby Hartnett*	1,793	0	1,793	Held major league record, 1939–1945; held NL record, 1934–1945
16	Ted Simmons*	1,771	297	1,474	
17	Johnny Bench*	1,742	0	1,742	
18	Ray Schalk*	1,727	1,722	5	Held major league record, 1925–1939; held AL record, 1920–1945; held single-season record, 1920–1944
19	Bill Dickey*	1,708	1,708	0	
20	Yogi Berra*	1,699	1,697	2	
21	Rick Dempsey	1,633	1,444	189	
22	Mike Piazza*	1,630	0	1,630	
23	Jim Hegan	1,629	1,536	93	
24	Brian McCann	1,612	483	1,129	
	Deacon McGuire	1,612	359	1,026	Includes 227 in American Association; held major league record, 1900–1925; held the single-season record, 1895–1908
26	Bill Freehan	1,581	1,581	0	
27	Russell Martin	1,579	651	928	
28	Jorge Posada	1,574	1,574	0	
29	Sherm Lollar	1,571	1,571	0	
30	Luke Sewell	1,562	1,562	0	
31	Ernie Lombardi*	1,544	0	1,544	
32	Kurt Suzuki	1,540	1,145	395	
33	Steve O'Neill	1,532	1,532	0	
34	Darrell Porter	1,506	1,006	500	
35	Jason Varitek	1,488	1,488	0	
36	Rollie Hemsley	1,482	1,024	458	
37	Del Crandall	1,479	49	1,430	
38	John Roseboro	1,476	258	1,218	
39	Mickey Cochrane*	1,451	1,451	0	
40	Ramón Hernández	1,447	957	490	
41	Wally Schang	1,435	1,435	0	
42	**Salvador Perez (44)**	1,427	1,427	0	
43	Muddy Ruel	1,410	1,410	0	
44	**J.T. Realmuto (123)**	1,401	0	1,401	
45	Mike Scioscia	1,395	0	1,395	
46	Johnny Edwards	1,392	0	1,392	
47	Tim McCarver	1,387	15	1,372	
48	Terry Steinbach	1,381	1,381	0	
49	Terry Kennedy	1,378	221	1,157	
50	Roy Campanella*	1,374	0	1,183	Includes 191 in Negro National League (incomplete)
51	Gus Mancuso	1,360	0	1,360	
52	Javy López	1,351	245	1,106	
	Jimmie Wilson	1,351	0	1,351	
54	Jerry Grote	1,348	22	1,326	
55	Bob O'Farrell	1,338	0	1,338	Held National League record, 1933–1934
56	Sandy Alomar Jr.	1,324	1,256	68	
57	Wilbert Robinson*	1,316	154	715	Includes 447 in American Association; held major league record, 1899–1900
58	Frankie Hayes	1,311	1,311	0	Held single-season record, 1944–1968; holds AL single-season record of 155 (set in 1944)
59	Alan Ashby	1,299	398	901	
60	Mike Matheny	1,285	389	896	
	Bengie Molina	1,285	839	446	
62	Spud Davis	1,282	0	1,282	
63	Dan Wilson	1,281	1,237	44	
64	Rick Cerone	1,279	1,079	200	
65	Thurman Munson	1,278	1,278	0	
66	Del Rice	1,249	31	1,218	
67	Joe Girardi	1,247	374	873	
	Frank Snyder	1,247	0	1,247	Held National League record, 1927–1933
	Butch Wynegar	1,247	1,247	0	
70	Ernie Whitt	1,246	1,187	59	
71	Chief Zimmer	1,239	0	1,162	Includes 77 in American Association; held the single-season record, 1890–1895
72	Don Slaught	1,237	793	444	
73	Ivey Wingo	1,233	0	1,233	
74	Steve Yeager	1,230	49	1,181	
75	Hank Severeid	1,225	1,181	44	
76	Walker Cooper	1,223	0	1,223	
77	Andy Seminick	1,213	0	1,213	
78	Tom Haller	1,199	36	1,163	
79	Malachi Kittridge	1,197	242	955	
80	Red Dooin	1,195	0	1,195	Held National League record, 1915–1927
81	George Gibson	1,194	0	1,194	Held single-season record, 1908–1920; held NL single-season record, 1908–1944
82	Mickey Owen	1,175	30	1,145	
83	Martín Maldonado	1,172	801	371	
84	Mike Lieberthal	1,170	0	1,170	
85	Johnny Kling	1,169	0	1,169	Held National League record, 1913–1915
86	Charles Johnson	1,160	280	880	
87	Darrin Fletcher	1,143	516	627	
	Brent Mayne	1,143	703	440	
89	Smoky Burgess	1,139	7	1,132	
90	Elston Howard	1,138	1,138	0	
91	Chris Iannetta	1,122	473	649	
	Billy Sullivan	1,122	1,034	88	Held AL single-season record, 1906–1911
93	**Yasmani Grandal (0)**	1,114	275	839	
	Manny Sanguillén	1,114	77	1,037	
95	Cy Perkins	1,111	1,111	0	
96	Birdie Tebbetts	1,108	1,108	0	
97	Phil Masi	1,101	217	884	
98	Jonathan Lucroy	1,098	303	795	
99	Todd Hundley	1,096	0	1,096	
100	Buster Posey	1,093	0	1,093	

== Other Hall of Famers ==
Player	Games as catcher			Other leagues, notes
Player	MLB	American League	National League	Other leagues, notes
Roger Bresnahan*	974	91	883	
Joe Mauer*	921	921	0	
Joe Torre*	903	0	903	
Buck Ewing*	636	0	555	Includes 81 in Players' League; held NL single-season record, 1889–1890
Biz Mackey*	617	0	0	Includes 242 in Negro National League (second), 209 in Eastern Colored League, 116 in Negro National League (first), 50 in American Negro League (incomplete)
Connie Mack*	610	0	498	Includes 112 in Players' League
King Kelly*	584	0	457	Includes 70 in American Association, 57 in Players' League
Josh Gibson*	513	0	0	Includes 512 in Negro National League (second), 1 in Negro National League (first) (incomplete)
Deacon White*	458	0	226	Includes 232 in National Association; held major league record, 1874–1881; held single-season record, 1873–1879
Craig Biggio*	428	0	428	
Jim O'Rourke*	231	0	209	Includes 22 in National Association
Jimmie Foxx*	108	106	2	
Louis Santop*	91	0	0	Includes 91 in Eastern Colored League (incomplete)
