= Bernie Miklasz =

American sports journalist

- Born: February 15, 1959 (age 67); Baltimore, Maryland, U.S.
- Occupation: Sports radio personality
- Spouse: Kirsten
- Children: Meredith

Bernie Miklasz (born Bernard Joseph Miklasz February 15, 1959) is an American sportswriter and sports radio personality. As of 2026, he is a contributor for STL Sports Central, KMOX, and Foul Territory.

A native of Baltimore, Maryland, Miklasz worked at the Baltimore News-American and The Dallas Morning News before moving to St. Louis in 1985 to cover professional football for the St. Louis Post-Dispatch. He was the lead sports columnist at the Post-Dispatch from 1999 to 2015. He hosted the morning show on 101 ESPN in St. Louis from 2015 to 2020. He joined KMOX in 2024. He joined STL Sports Central in 2025.

== Selection committees ==
- Heisman Trophy in college football
- Former member of the Board of Selectors for the Pro Football Hall of Fame.
- As a member of the Baseball Writers' Association of America, he votes for:
  - Baseball Hall of Fame inductees
  - National League Cy Young Award
  - MLB Most Valuable Player Award
  - MLB Rookie of the Year Award
  - MLB Manager of the Year Award

== Personal life ==
Bernie Miklasz lives in St. Louis, Missouri, and is married.
