= 2016 Tampa Bay Rays season =

2016 Tampa Bay Rays
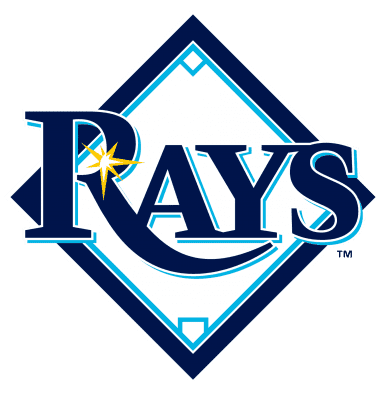
- League: American League
- Division: East
- Ballpark: Tropicana Field
- City: St. Petersburg, Florida
- Record: 68–94 (.420)
- Divisional place: 5th
- Owners: Stuart Sternberg
- Managers: Kevin Cash
- Television: Sun Sports (Dewayne Staats, Brian Anderson, Todd Kalas)
- Radio: Tampa Bay Rays Radio Network (English) (Andy Freed, Dave Wills, Todd Kalas); WGES (Spanish) (Ricardo Taveras, Enrique Oliu)

The 2016 Tampa Bay Rays season was the Rays' 19th season of Major League Baseball and the ninth as the "Rays" (all at Tropicana Field). After starting the season 31–32, the Rays went 37–62 across their final 100 games, including a dismal 3–24 stretch before the All-Star Break, to finish at 68–94, their worst record since the 2007 season.

In March 2016, the Rays traveled to Cuba to play an exhibition game against the Cuba national baseball team to accompany Barack Obama's visit to Cuba, the first United States presidential visit to Cuba in 88 years. It was a landmark in Cuba–United States relations. With Obama and Raúl Castro in attendance, the Rays beat Cuba 4–1.

== Season standings ==
=== American League East ===
AL East
| Team | W | L | Pct. | GB | Home | Road |
|---|---|---|---|---|---|---|
| Boston Red Sox | 93 | 69 | .574 | — | 47‍–‍34 | 46‍–‍35 |
| Toronto Blue Jays | 89 | 73 | .549 | 4 | 51‍–‍30 | 38‍–‍43 |
| Baltimore Orioles | 89 | 73 | .549 | 4 | 50‍–‍31 | 39‍–‍42 |
| New York Yankees | 84 | 78 | .519 | 9 | 48‍–‍33 | 36‍–‍45 |
| Tampa Bay Rays | 68 | 94 | .420 | 25 | 36‍–‍45 | 32‍–‍49 |

=== American League Wild Card ===
Division leaders
| Team | W | L | Pct. |
|---|---|---|---|
| Texas Rangers | 95 | 67 | .586 |
| Cleveland Indians | 94 | 67 | .584 |
| Boston Red Sox | 93 | 69 | .574 |

Wild Card teams (Top 2 teams qualify for postseason)
| Team | W | L | Pct. | GB |
|---|---|---|---|---|
| Toronto Blue Jays | 89 | 73 | .549 | — |
| Baltimore Orioles | 89 | 73 | .549 | — |
| Detroit Tigers | 86 | 75 | .534 | 2½ |
| Seattle Mariners | 86 | 76 | .531 | 3 |
| New York Yankees | 84 | 78 | .519 | 5 |
| Houston Astros | 84 | 78 | .519 | 5 |
| Kansas City Royals | 81 | 81 | .500 | 8 |
| Chicago White Sox | 78 | 84 | .481 | 11 |
| Los Angeles Angels | 74 | 88 | .457 | 15 |
| Oakland Athletics | 69 | 93 | .426 | 20 |
| Tampa Bay Rays | 68 | 94 | .420 | 21 |
| Minnesota Twins | 59 | 103 | .364 | 30 |

=== Record against opponents ===
2016 American League record Source: MLB Standings Grid – 2016
| Team | BAL | BOS | CWS | CLE | DET | HOU | KC | LAA | MIN | NYY | OAK | SEA | TB | TEX | TOR | NL |
|---|---|---|---|---|---|---|---|---|---|---|---|---|---|---|---|---|
| Baltimore | — | 8–11 | 4–3 | 5–1 | 5–2 | 1–6 | 4–2 | 4–2 | 5–1 | 10–9 | 3–4 | 1–6 | 13–6 | 3–4 | 9–10 | 14–6 |
| Boston | 11–8 | — | 3–4 | 4–2 | 2–5 | 5–2 | 2–4 | 4–3 | 4–3 | 11–8 | 5–1 | 4–3 | 12–7 | 3–3 | 9–10 | 14–6 |
| Chicago | 3–4 | 4–3 | — | 8–11 | 7–12 | 3–3 | 5–14 | 2–5 | 12–7 | 3–3 | 5–2 | 4–3 | 4–3 | 4–2 | 5–1 | 9–11 |
| Cleveland | 1–5 | 2–4 | 11–8 | — | 14–4 | 3–4 | 14–5 | 6–1 | 10–9 | 2–5 | 4–2 | 3–4 | 5–1 | 2–5 | 4–3 | 13–7 |
| Detroit | 2–5 | 5–2 | 12–7 | 4–14 | — | 4–2 | 7–12 | 2–4 | 15–4 | 3–3 | 4–3 | 4–3 | 6–1 | 2–4 | 3–4 | 13–7 |
| Houston | 6–1 | 2–5 | 3–3 | 4–3 | 2–4 | — | 3–4 | 13–6 | 5–2 | 2–4 | 13–6 | 11–8 | 3–3 | 4–15 | 2–5 | 11–9 |
| Kansas City | 2–4 | 4–2 | 14–5 | 5–14 | 12–7 | 4–3 | — | 1–5 | 15–4 | 2–5 | 1–6 | 3–4 | 5–2 | 1–6 | 2–4 | 10–10 |
| Los Angeles | 2–4 | 3–4 | 5–2 | 1–6 | 4–2 | 6–13 | 5–1 | — | 2–4 | 1–6 | 12–7 | 8–11 | 3–4 | 9–10 | 4–3 | 9–11 |
| Minnesota | 1–5 | 3–4 | 7–12 | 9–10 | 4–15 | 2–5 | 4–15 | 4–2 | — | 2–5 | 2–4 | 4–2 | 3–4 | 5–2 | 1–6 | 8–12 |
| New York | 9–10 | 8–11 | 3–3 | 5–2 | 3–3 | 4–2 | 5–2 | 6–1 | 5–2 | — | 4–3 | 3–3 | 11–8 | 3–4 | 7–12 | 8–12 |
| Oakland | 4–3 | 1–5 | 2–5 | 2–4 | 3–4 | 6–13 | 6–1 | 7–12 | 4–2 | 3–4 | — | 7–12 | 5–2 | 9–10 | 3–3 | 7–13 |
| Seattle | 6–1 | 3–4 | 3–4 | 4–3 | 3–4 | 8–11 | 4–3 | 11–8 | 2–4 | 3–3 | 12–7 | — | 4–2 | 7–12 | 3–3 | 13–7 |
| Tampa Bay | 6–13 | 7–12 | 3–4 | 1–5 | 1–6 | 3–3 | 2–5 | 4–3 | 4–3 | 8–11 | 2–5 | 2–4 | — | 4–2 | 11–8 | 10–10 |
| Texas | 4–3 | 3–3 | 2–4 | 5–2 | 4–2 | 15–4 | 6–1 | 10–9 | 2–5 | 4–3 | 10–9 | 12–7 | 2–4 | — | 3–4 | 13–7 |
| Toronto | 10–9 | 10–9 | 1–5 | 3–4 | 4–3 | 5–2 | 4–2 | 3–4 | 6–1 | 12–7 | 3–3 | 3–3 | 8–11 | 4–3 | — | 13–7 |

== Regular season summary ==
=== Game log ===
Legend
| | Rays win |
| | Rays loss |
| | Postponement |
| **Bold** | Rays team member |

2016 Game Log (68–94)
April: 11–12 (Home: 8–7; Away: 3–5)

| # | Date | Opponent | Score | Win | Loss | Save | Attendance | Record | Streak |
|---|---|---|---|---|---|---|---|---|---|
| 1 | April 3 | Blue Jays | 3–5 | Stroman (1–0) | **Archer** (0–1) | Osuna (1) | 31,042 | 0–1 | L1 |
| 2 | April 4 | Blue Jays | 3–5 | Dickey (1–0) | **Smyly** (0–1) | Osuna (2) | 15,116 | 0–2 | L2 |
| 3 | April 5 | Blue Jays | 3–2 | **Colomé** (1–0) | Cecil (0–1) | — | 12,757 | 1–2 | W1 |
| 4 | April 6 | Blue Jays | 5–3 | **Ramírez** (1–0) | Floyd (0–1) | — | 14,257 | 2–2 | W2 |
| 5 | April 8 | @ Orioles | 1–6 | Tillman (1–0) | **Archer** (0–2) | — | 17,304 | 2–3 | L1 |
| — | April 9 | @ Orioles | Postponed (snow); Makeup: June 25 | | | | | | |
| 6 | April 10 | @ Orioles | 3–5 | Brach (1–0) | **Odorizzi** (0–1) | Britton (2) | 23,101 | 2–4 | L2 |
| 7 | April 12 | Indians | 5–1 | **Cedeño** (1–0) | Kluber (0–2) | — | 10,283 | 3–4 | W1 |
| 8 | April 13 | Indians | 1–4 | Carrasco (1–0) | **Smyly** (0–2) | Allen (2) | 10,117 | 3–5 | L1 |
| 9 | April 14 | Indians | 0–6 | Salazar (2–0) | **Archer** (0–3) | — | 10,715 | 3–6 | L2 |
| 10 | April 15 | White Sox | 0–1 | Sale (3–0) | **Colomé** (1–1) | — | 16,801 | 3–7 | L3 |
| 11 | April 16 | White Sox | 7–2 | **Ramírez** (2–0) | Danks (0–2) | — | 30,451 | 4–7 | W1 |
| 12 | April 17 | White Sox | 3–2 | **Moore** (1–0) | Quintana (1–1) | **Colomé** (1) | 21,810 | 5–7 | W2 |
| 13 | April 19 | @ Red Sox | 3–0 (10) | **Ramírez** (3–0) | Barnes (1–1) | **Colomé** (2) | 32,061 | 6–7 | W3 |
| 14 | April 20 | @ Red Sox | 3–7 | Porcello (3–0) | **Archer** (0–4) | — | 31,689 | 6–8 | L1 |
| 15 | April 21 | @ Red Sox | 12–8 | **Ramírez** (4–0) | Cuevas (0–1) | **Colomé** (3) | 37,954 | 7–8 | W1 |
| 16 | April 22 | @ Yankees | 3–6 | Nova (1–0) | **Moore** (1–1) | Miller (4) | 31,843 | 7–9 | L1 |
| 17 | April 23 | @ Yankees | 2–3 | Miller (1–0) | **Ramírez** (4–1) | — | 40,714 | 7–10 | L2 |
| 18 | April 24 | @ Yankees | 8–1 | **Smyly** (1–2) | Pineda (1–2) | — | 40,981 | 8–10 | W1 |
| 19 | April 25 | Orioles | 2–0 | **Archer** (1–4) | Gausman (0–1) | **Colomé** (4) | 12,996 | 9–10 | W2 |
| 20 | April 26 | Orioles | 3–1 | **Romero** (1–0) | Jiménez (1–2) | **Colomé** (5) | 10,988 | 10–10 | W3 |
| 21 | April 27 | Orioles | 1–3 | Tillman (2–1) | **Moore** (1–2) | Britton (5) | 11,850 | 10–11 | L1 |
| 22 | April 29 | Blue Jays | 1–6 | Sanchez (2–1) | **Smyly** (1–3) | — | 13,679 | 10–12 | L2 |
| 23 | April 30 | Blue Jays | 4–3 | **Cedeño** (2–0) | Cecil (0–5) | — | 14,948 | 11–12 | W1 |

May: 11–16 (Home: 3–8; Away: 8–8)

| # | Date | Opponent | Score | Win | Loss | Save | Attendance | Record | Streak |
|---|---|---|---|---|---|---|---|---|---|
| 24 | May 1 | Blue Jays | 1–5 | Stroman (4–0) | **Cedeño** (2–1) | — | 27,217 | 11–13 | L1 |
| 25 | May 3 | Dodgers | 5–10 | Kazmir (2–2) | **Moore** (1–3) | Jansen (10) | 14,116 | 11–14 | L2 |
| 26 | May 4 | Dodgers | 8–5 | **Ramírez** (5–1) | Wood (1–3) | **Colomé** (6) | 13,226 | 12–14 | W1 |
| 27 | May 6 | @ Angels | 5–2 | **Archer** (2–4) | Rasmus (0–2) | **Colomé** (7) | 41,253 | 13–14 | W2 |
| 28 | May 7 | @ Angels | 4–2 | **Ramírez** (6–1) | Smith (0–2) | **Colomé** (8) | 40,142 | 14–14 | W3 |
| 29 | May 8 | @ Angels | 3–1 | **Andriese** (1–0) | Tropeano (1–2) | **Colomé** (9) | 41,086 | 15–14 | W4 |
| 30 | May 9 | @ Mariners | 2–5 | Hernandez (3–2) | **Eveland** (0–1) | Cishek (10) | 15,230 | 15–15 | L1 |
| 31 | May 10 | @ Mariners | 4–6 | Miley (3–2) | **Smyly** (1–4) | Cishek (11) | 16,013 | 15–16 | L2 |
| 32 | May 11 | @ Mariners | 5–6 (11) | Johnson (1–0) | **Geltz** (0–1) | — | 23,000 | 15–17 | L3 |
| 33 | May 13 | Athletics | 3–6 | Hill (5–3) | **Odorizzi** (0–2) | Madson (9) | 14,604 | 15–18 | L4 |
| 34 | May 14 | Athletics | 6–0 | **Andriese** (2–0) | Graveman (1–5) | — | 28,158 | 16–18 | W1 |
| 35 | May 15 | Athletics | 6–7 | Axford (3–1) | **Geltz** (0–2) | Madson (10) | 19,545 | 16–19 | L1 |
| 36 | May 16 | @ Blue Jays | 13–2 | **Smyly** (2–4) | Happ (5–1) | — | 26,516 | 17–19 | W1 |
| 37 | May 17 | @ Blue Jays | 12–2 | **Archer** (3–4) | Stroman (4–1) | — | 27,521 | 18–19 | W2 |
| 38 | May 18 | @ Blue Jays | 6–3 | **Odorizzi** (1–2) | Dickey (2–5) | **Colomé** (10) | 29,078 | 19–19 | W3 |
| 39 | May 20 | @ Tigers | 7–5 | **Andriese** (3–0) | Sánchez (3–5) | **Colomé** (11) | 30,304 | 20–19 | W4 |
| 40 | May 21 | @ Tigers | 4–5 | Fulmer (3–1) | **Smyly** (2–5) | Rodríguez (12) | 32,316 | 20–20 | L1 |
| 41 | May 22 | @ Tigers | 4–9 | Zimmermann (7–2) | **Archer** (3–5) | — | 34,758 | 20–21 | L2 |
| 42 | May 23 | @ Marlins | 6–7 | Phelps (3–2) | **Ramírez** (6–2) | Ramos (14) | 17,969 | 20–22 | L3 |
| 43 | May 24 | @ Marlins | 4–3 | **Odorizzi** (2–2) | Koehler (2–5) | **Colomé** (12) | 23,709 | 21–22 | W1 |
| 44 | May 25 | Marlins | 3–4 | Barraclough (3–1) | **Sturdevant** (0–1) | Ramos (15) | 13,554 | 21–23 | L1 |
| 45 | May 26 | Marlins | 1–9 | Fernández (7–2) | **Smyly** (2–6) | — | 11,399 | 21–24 | L2 |
| 46 | May 27 | Yankees | 4–1 | Tanaka (3–0) | **Archer** (3–6) | — | 14,697 | 21–25 | L3 |
| 47 | May 28 | Yankees | 9–5 | **Moore** (2–3) | Pineda (2–6) | — | 20,188 | 22–25 | W1 |
| 48 | May 29 | Yankees | 1–2 | Eovaldi (6–2) | **Odorizzi** (2–3) | Chapman (7) | 19,748 | 22–26 | L1 |
| 49 | May 30 | @ Royals | 2–6 | Herrera (1–1) | **Ramírez** (6–3) | — | 32,018 | 22–27 | L2 |
| 50 | May 31 | @ Royals | 5–10 | Gee (2–2) | **Smyly** (2–7) | Davis (15) | 26,006 | 22–28 | L3 |

June: 11–17 (Home: 6–7; Away: 5–10)

| # | Date | Opponent | Score | Win | Loss | Save | Attendance | Record | Recap |
|---|---|---|---|---|---|---|---|---|---|
| 51 | June 1 | @ Royals | 3–6 | Duffy (1–0) | **Archer** (3–7) | Davis (16) | 30,554 | 22–29 | L4 |
| 52 | June 2 | @ Twins | 4–6 | Rogers (1–0) | **Ramírez** (6–4) | Jepsen (7) | 20,193 | 22–30 | L5 |
| 53 | June 3 | @ Twins | 4–2 | **Ramírez** (7–4) | Nolasco (2–4) | **Colomé** (13) | 21,134 | 23–30 | W1 |
| 54 | June 4 | @ Twins | 7–4 | **Andriese** (4–0) | Santana (1–5) | **Colomé** (14) | 26,613 | 24–30 | W2 |
| 55 | June 5 | @ Twins | 7–5 | **Cedeño** (3–1) | Jepsen (2–5) | **Colomé** (15) | 25,510 | 25–30 | W3 |
| 56 | June 6 | @ Diamondbacks | 6–4 | **Archer** (4–7) | Ray (2–5) | **Colomé** (16) | 17,176 | 26–30 | W4 |
| 57 | June 7 | @ Diamondbacks | 0–5 | Greinke (8–3) | **Moore** (2–4) | — | 17,964 | 26–31 | L1 |
| 58 | June 8 | @ Diamondbacks | 6–3 | **Odorizzi** (3–3) | Bradley (2–2) | **Colomé** (17) | 16,954 | 27–31 | W1 |
| 59 | June 10 | Astros | 4–3 | **Andriese** (5–0) | McCullers Jr. (3–2) | **Colomé** (18) | 13,075 | 28–31 | W2 |
| 60 | June 11 | Astros | 3–4 | Fiers (4–3) | **Archer** (4–8) | Harris (3) | 19,658 | 28–32 | L1 |
| 61 | June 12 | Astros | 5–0 | **Moore** (3–4) | Keuchel (3–9) | — | 11,168 | 29–32 | W1 |
| 62 | June 14 | Mariners | 8–7 | **Garton** (1–0) | Montgomery (2–2) | **Colomé** (19) | 11,455 | 30–32 | W2 |
| 63 | June 15 | Mariners | 3–2 (13) | **Andriese** (6–0) | Montgomery (2–3) | — | 12,239 | 31–32 | W3 |
| 64 | June 16 | Mariners | 4–6 | Paxton (1–2) | **Snell** (0–1) | Cishek (15) | 11,331 | 31–33 | L1 |
| 65 | June 17 | Giants | 1–5 | Samardzija (8–4) | **Archer** (4–9) | — | 40,135 | 31–34 | L2 |
| 66 | June 18 | Giants | 4–6 | Strickland (3–0) | **Colomé** (1–2) | Gearrin (2) | 23,948 | 31–35 | L3 |
| 67 | June 19 | Giants | 1–5 | Law (2–1) | **Cedeño** (3–2) | — | 17,361 | 31–36 | L4 |
| 68 | June 20 | @ Indians | 4–7 | Shaw (1–3) | **Ramírez** (7–5) | Allen (14) | 13,811 | 31–37 | L5 |
| 69 | June 21 | @ Indians | 0–6 | Kluber (7–7) | **Snell** (0–2) | — | 15,629 | 31–38 | L6 |
| 70 | June 22 | @ Indians | 1–6 | Bauer (5–2) | **Archer** (4–10) | — | 21,216 | 31–39 | L7 |
| 71 | June 24 | @ Orioles | 3–6 | Tolliver (1–0) | **Moore** (3–5) | Britton (22) | 44,956 | 31–40 | L8 |
| 72 | June 25 (1) | @ Orioles | 0–5 | Gausman (1–5) | **Andriese** (6–1) | — | 18,229 | 31–41 | L9 |
| 73 | June 25 (2) | @ Orioles | 6–8 | McFarland (2–2) | **Ramírez** (7–6) | Britton (23) | 33,040 | 31–42 | L10 |
| 74 | June 26 | @ Orioles | 5–12 | Wilson (4–5) | **Smyly** (2–8) | — | 38,611 | 31–43 | L11 |
| 75 | June 27 | Red Sox | 13–7 | **Snell** (1–2) | Rodríguez (1–3) | — | 18,024 | 32–43 | W1 |
| 76 | June 28 | Red Sox | 2–8 | Porcello (9–2) | **Archer** (4–11) | — | 16,986 | 32–44 | L1 |
| 77 | June 29 | Red Sox | 4–0 | **Moore** (4–5) | Price (8–5) | — | 24,110 | 33–44 | W1 |
| 78 | June 30 | Tigers | 7–10 | Sánchez (5–8) | **Ramírez** (7–7) | Rodríguez (22) | 10,729 | 33–45 | L1 |

July: 9–16 (Home: 5–8; Away: 4–8)

| # | Date | Opponent | Score | Win | Loss | Save | Attendance | Record | Recap |
|---|---|---|---|---|---|---|---|---|---|
| 79 | July 1 | Tigers | 2–10 | Fulmer (8–2) | **Smyly** (2–9) | — | 13,537 | 33–46 | L2 |
| 80 | July 2 | Tigers | 2–3 | Verlander (8–6) | **Snell** (1–3) | Rodriguez (23) | 17,861 | 33–47 | L3 |
| 81 | July 3 | Tigers | 1–5 | Rondón (2–0) | **Andriese** (6–2) | — | 13,126 | 33–48 | L4 |
| 82 | July 4 | Angels | 4–2 | **Moore** (5–5) | Salas (3–6) | **Garton** (1) | 14,532 | 34–48 | W1 |
| 83 | July 5 | Angels | 5–13 | Guerra (2–0) | **Odorizzi** (3–4) | — | 14,896 | 34–49 | L1 |
| 84 | July 6 | Angels | 2–7 | Weaver (7–7) | **Smyly** (2–10) | — | 11,267 | 34–50 | L2 |
| 85 | July 7 | Angels | 1–5 | Santiago (6–4) | **Snell** (1–4) | — | 14,576 | 34–51 | L3 |
| 86 | July 8 | @ Red Sox | 5–6 | Ross Jr. (1–1) | **Archer** (4–12) | Uehara (3) | 37,739 | 34–52 | L4 |
| 87 | July 9 | @ Red Sox | 1–4 | Porcello (11–2) | **Moore** (5–6) | Uehara (4) | 36,900 | 34–53 | L5 |
| 88 | July 10 | @ Red Sox | 0–4 | Price (9–6) | **Odorizzi** (3–5) | — | 36,669 | 34–54 | L6 |
**87th All-Star Game in San Diego, California**
| 89 | July 15 | Orioles | 3–4 | Givens (7–1) | **Archer** (4–13) | Britton (28) | 17,672 | 34–55 | L7 |
| 90 | July 16 | Orioles | 1–2 | Tillman (13–2) | **Moore** (5–7) | Britton (29) | 18,638 | 34–56 | L8 |
| 91 | July 17 | Orioles | 5–2 | **Odorizzi** (4–5) | Bundy (2–2) | **Colomé** (20) | 16,161 | 35–56 | W1 |
| 92 | July 18 | @ Rockies | 4–7 | Anderson (2–3) | **Smyly** (2–11) | Estévez | 30,601 | 35–57 | L1 |
| 93 | July 19 | @ Rockies | 10–1 | **Snell** (2–4) | Chatwood (8–6) | **Andriese** (1) | 33,061 | 36–57 | W1 |
| 94 | July 20 | @ Rockies | 11–3 | **Archer** (5–13) | de la Rosa (6–7) | — | 31,456 | 37–57 | W2 |
| 95 | July 21 | @ Athletics | 7–3 | **Moore** (6–7) | Gray (4–9) | **Colomé** (21) | 14,412 | 38–57 | W3 |
| 96 | July 22 | @ Athletics | 0–1 (13) | Axford (4–3) | **Floro** (0–1) | — | 15,250 | 38–58 | L1 |
| 97 | July 23 | @ Athletics | 3–4 | Graveman (7–6) | **Colomé** (1–3) | — | 30,436 | 38–59 | L2 |
| 98 | July 24 | @ Athletics | 2–3 | Dull (4–2) | **Ramírez** (7–8) | Madson (21) | 17,642 | 38–60 | L3 |
| 99 | July 26 | @ Dodgers | 2–3 | Norris (6–9) | **Archer** (5–14) | Jansen (30) | 46,960 | 38–61 | L4 |
| 100 | July 27 | @ Dodgers | 3–1 | **Moore** (7–7) | McCarthy (2–1) | **Colomé** (22) | 43,576 | 39–61 | W1 |
| 101 | July 29 | Yankees | 5–1 | **Odorizzi** (5–5) | Nova (7–6) | **Colomé** (23) | 17,856 | 40–61 | W2 |
| 102 | July 30 | Yankees | 6–3 | **Smyly** (3–11) | Eovaldi (9–7) | **Colomé** (24) | 25,883 | 41–61 | W3 |
| 103 | July 31 | Yankees | 5–3 | **Snell** (3–4) | Pineda (5–10) | **Colomé** (25) | 18,109 | 42–61 | W4 |

August: 14–15 (Home: 10–7; Away: 4–8)

| # | Date | Opponent | Score | Win | Loss | Save | Attendance | Record | Recap |
|---|---|---|---|---|---|---|---|---|---|
| 104 | August 1 | Royals | 0–3 | Duffy (7–1) | **Archer** (5–15) | Herrera (2) | 13,976 | 42–62 | L1 |
| 105 | August 2 | Royals | 2–3 | Young (3–8) | **Cedeño** (3–3) | Herrera (3) | 12,625 | 42–63 | L2 |
| 106 | August 3 | Royals | 12–0 | **Odorizzi** (6–5) | Vólquez (8–10) | — | 11,149 | 43–63 | W1 |
| 107 | August 4 | Royals | 3–2 | **Boxberger** (1–0) | Soria (4–5) | **Colomé** (26) | 13,120 | 44–63 | W2 |
| 108 | August 5 | Twins | 2–6 | Santana (5–9) | **Ramírez** (7–9) | — | 12,161 | 44–64 | L1 |
| 109 | August 6 | Twins | 7–3 | **Archer** (6–15) | Berríos (2–2) | **Colomé** (27) | 15,603 | 45–64 | W1 |
| 110 | August 7 | Twins | 3–6 | Gibson (4–6) | **Andriese** (6–3) | Kintzler (9) | 12,649 | 45–65 | L1 |
| 111 | August 8 | @ Blue Jays | 5–7 | Benoit (2–1) | **Cedeño** (3–4) | Osuna (25) | 43,812 | 45–66 | L2 |
| 112 | August 9 | @ Blue Jays | 9–2 | **Smyly** (4–11) | Estrada (7–5) | **Ramírez** (1) | 43,134 | 46–66 | W1 |
| 113 | August 10 | @ Blue Jays | 0–7 | Happ (16–3) | **Snell** (3–5) | — | 45,501 | 46–67 | L1 |
| 114 | August 12 | @ Yankees | 3–6 | Sabathia (7–9) | **Archer** (6–16) | Betances (4) | 46,459 | 46–68 | L2 |
| 115 | August 13 | @ Yankees | 4–8 | Tanaka (9–4) | **Andriese** (6–4) | — | 41,682 | 46–69 | L3 |
| 116 | August 14 | @ Yankees | 12–3 | **Odorizzi** (7–5) | Severino (1–8) | — | 41,473 | 47–69 | W1 |
| 117 | August 15 | Padres | 8–2 | **Smyly** (5–11) | Perdomo (5–7) | — | 10,417 | 48–69 | W2 |
| 118 | August 16 | Padres | 15–1 | **Snell** (4–5) | Jackson (3–3) | — | 10,793 | 49–69 | W3 |
| 119 | August 17 | Padres | 2–0 | **Archer** (7–16) | Friedrich (4–9) | **Colomé** (28) | 10,251 | 50–69 | W4 |
| 120 | August 19 | Rangers | 2–6 | Hamels (13–4) | **Andriese** (6–5) | — | 15,109 | 50–70 | L1 |
| 121 | August 20 | Rangers | 8–2 | **Odorizzi** (8–5) | Griffin (5–3) | — | 16,505 | 51–70 | W1 |
| 122 | August 21 | Rangers | 8–4 | **Smyly** (6–11) | Pérez (8–9) | — | 17,685 | 52–70 | W2 |
| 123 | August 22 | Red Sox | 2–6 | Price (12–8) | **Snell** (4–6) | — | 13,576 | 52–71 | L1 |
| 124 | August 23 | Red Sox | 1–2 | Buchholz (5–9) | **Archer** (7–17) | Kimbrel (23) | 11,249 | 52–72 | L2 |
| 125 | August 24 | Red Sox | 4–3 (11) | **Boxberger** (2–0) | Hembree (4–1) | — | 11,896 | 53–72 | W1 |
| 126 | August 25 | Red Sox | 2–1 | **Odorizzi** (9–5) | Pomeranz (10–10) | **Romero** (1) | 12,059 | 54–72 | W2 |
| 127 | August 26 | @ Astros | 4–5 | Giles (2–3) | **Colomé** (1–4) | — | 25,852 | 54–73 | L1 |
| 128 | August 27 | @ Astros | 2–6 | Keuchel (9–12) | **Snell** (4–7) | — | 36,544 | 54–74 | L2 |
| 129 | August 28 | @ Astros | 10–4 | **Archer** (8–17) | Fister (12–9) | — | 37,484 | 55–74 | W1 |
| 130 | August 29 | @ Red Sox | 4–9 | Porcello (18–3) | **Andriese** (6–6) | — | 36,948 | 55–75 | L1 |
| 131 | August 30 | @ Red Sox | 4–3 | **Romero** (2–0) | Buchholz (5–10) | **Colomé** (29) | 37,083 | 56–75 | W1 |
| 132 | August 31 | @ Red Sox | 6–8 | Tazawa (3–2) | **Ramírez** (7–10) | Kimbrel (24) | 36,786 | 56–76 | L1 |

September: 10–18 (Home: 4–8; Away: 6–10)

| # | Date | Opponent | Score | Win | Loss | Save | Attendance | Record | Recap |
|---|---|---|---|---|---|---|---|---|---|
| 133 | September 2 | Blue Jays | 8–3 | **Farquhar** (1–0) | Stroman (9–6) | — | 12,602 | 57–76 | W1 |
| 134 | September 3 | Blue Jays | 7–5 | **Snell** (5–7) | Estrada (8–7) | **Colomé** (30) | 14,353 | 58–76 | W2 |
| 135 | September 4 | Blue Jays | 3–5 | Benoit (3–1) | **Jepsen** (2–6) | Osuna (30) | 13,884 | 58–77 | L1 |
| 136 | September 5 | Orioles | 3–7 | Jiménez (6–11) | **Andriese** (6–7) | — | 12,256 | 58–78 | L2 |
| 137 | September 6 | Orioles | 2–11 | Gallardo (5–7) | **Odorizzi** (9–6) | — | 12,207 | 58–79 | L3 |
| 138 | September 7 | Orioles | 7–6 | **Boxberger** (3–0) | Givens (8–2) | **Colomé** (31) | 10,537 | 59–79 | W1 |
| 139 | September 8 | @ Yankees | 4–5 | Layne (2–1) | **Ramírez** (7–11) | — | 27,631 | 59–80 | L1 |
| 140 | September 9 | @ Yankees | 5–7 | Warren (5–3) | **Snell** (5–8) | Betances (10) | 30,194 | 59–81 | L2 |
| 141 | September 10 | @ Yankees | 1–5 | Tanaka (13–4) | **Archer** (8–18) | — | 33,460 | 59–82 | L3 |
| 142 | September 11 | @ Yankees | 4–2 | **Andriese** (7–7) | Cessa (4–1) | **Colomé** (32) | 33,087 | 60–82 | W1 |
| 143 | September 12 | @ Blue Jays | 2–3 | Grilli (6–5) | **Boxberger** (3–1) | Osuna (32) | 35,333 | 60–83 | L1 |
| 144 | September 13 | @ Blue Jays | 6–2 | **Smyly** (7–11) | Stroman (9–8) | — | 38,338 | 61–83 | W1 |
| 145 | September 14 | @ Blue Jays | 8–1 | **Cobb** (1–0) | Estrada (8–9) | — | 41,001 | 62–83 | W2 |
| 146 | September 15 | @ Orioles | 7–6 | **Boxberger** (4–1) | Gallardo (5–8) | **Colomé** (33) | 19,233 | 63–83 | W3 |
| 147 | September 16 | @ Orioles | 4–5 | Brach (9–3) | **Boxberger** (4–2) | Britton (44) | 30,094 | 63–84 | L1 |
| 148 | September 17 | @ Orioles | 5–2 | **Andriese** (8–7) | Tillman (16–6) | **Colomé** (34) | 27,823 | 64–84 | W1 |
| 149 | September 18 | @ Orioles | 1–2 | Brach (10–3) | **Garton** (1–1) | Britton (45) | 28,427 | 64–85 | L1 |
| 150 | September 20 | Yankees | 3–5 | Severino (3–8) | **Boxberger** (4–3) | Betances (12) | 12,732 | 64–86 | L2 |
| 151 | September 21 | Yankees | 5–11 | Tanaka (14–4) | **Cobb** (1–1) | — | 12,192 | 64–87 | L3 |
| 152 | September 22 | Yankees | 2–0 | **Snell** (6–8) | Cessa (4–3) | **Colomé** (35) | 13,355 | 65–87 | W1 |
| 153 | September 23 | Red Sox | 1–2 | Pomeranz (11–12) | **Archer** (8–19) | Ziegler (22) | 20,543 | 65–88 | L1 |
| 154 | September 24 | Red Sox | 4–6 | Porcello (22–4) | **Garton** (1–2) | Kimbrel (30) | 25,641 | 65–89 | L2 |
| 155 | September 25 | Red Sox | 2–3 (10) | Kelly (4–0) | **Gamboa** (0–1) | — | 26,443 | 65–90 | L3 |
| 156 | September 26 | @ White Sox | 1–7 | Shields (6–18) | **Smyly** (7–12) | — | 13,655 | 65–91 | L4 |
| 157 | September 27 | @ White Sox | 6–13 | Sale (17–9) | **Cobb** (1–2) | — | 14,798 | 65–92 | L5 |
| 158 | September 28 | @ White Sox | 0–1 | González (5–8) | **Gamboa** (0–2) | Robertson (37) | 12,976 | 65–93 | L6 |
| 159 | September 29 | @ White Sox | 5–3 | **Archer** (9–19) | Quintana (13–12) | **Colomé** (36) | 14,792 | 66–93 | W1 |
| 160 | September 30 | @ Rangers | 1–3 | Darvish (7–5) | **Andriese** (8–8) | Dyson (38) | 35,968 | 66–94 | L1 |

October: 2–0 (Home: 0–0; Away: 2–0)

| # | Date | Opponent | Score | Win | Loss | Save | Attendance | Record | Recap |
|---|---|---|---|---|---|---|---|---|---|
| 161 | October 1 | @ Rangers | 4–1 | **Odorizzi** (10–6) | Lewis (6–5) | **Colomé** (37) | 42,093 | 67–94 | W1 |
| 162 | October 2 | @ Rangers | 6–4 (10) | **Colomé** (2–4) | Scheppers (1–1) | **Ramírez** (2) | 37,015 | 68–94 | W2 |

Legend: = Win = Loss = Postponement
Bold = Rays team member

== Roster ==
2016 Tampa Bay Rays
Roster
| Pitchers: 35 Matt Andriese; 22 Chris Archer; 26 Brad Boxberger; 31 Xavier Cedeño; 53 Alex Cobb; 37 Álex Colomé; 51,56 Dana Eveland; 43 Danny Farquhar; 49 Dylan Floro; 59 Eddie Gamboa; 52 Ryan Garton; 54 Steve Geltz; 40 Kevin Jepsen; 50 Jhan Mariñez; 58 Justin Marks; 55 Matt Moore; 23 Jake Odorizzi; 30 Erasmo Ramírez; 45 Enny Romero; 33 Drew Smyly; 4 Blake Snell; 50 Tyler Sturdevant; 58 Ryan Webb; 47 Chase Whitley | Catchers: 19 Curt Casali; 24 Hank Conger; 46 Luke Maile; 21 Bobby Wilson; Infielders: 1 Tim Beckham; 5 Matt Duffy; 11 Logan Forsythe; 3 Evan Longoria; 13 Brad Miller; 7 Logan Morrison; 9 Juniel Querecuto; 24 Alexei Ramírez; 36 Richie Shaffer | Outfielders: 9 Oswaldo Arcia; 14 Jaff Decker; 10 Corey Dickerson; 2 Nick Franklin; 5 Brandon Guyer; 8 Desmond Jennings; 39 Kevin Kiermaier; 27 Mikie Mahtook; 38 Taylor Motter; 28 Steve Pearce; 20 Steven Souza | Manager: 16 Kevin Cash; Coaches: 15 Rocco Baldelli (first base); 41 Stan Boroski (bullpen); 77 Scott Cursi (bullpen catcher); 99 Misha Dworken (bullpen catcher); 6 Tom Foley (bench); 48 Jim Hickey (pitching); 25 Charlie Montoyo (third base); 51 Chad Mottola (hitting) (September 6-end of season); 4,44 Jamie Nelson (assistant hitting); 17 Derek Shelton (hitting) (beginning of season-September 5) |

== Player stats ==
=== Batting ===
Note: G = Games played; AB = At bats; R = Runs; H = Hits; 2B = Doubles; 3B = Triples; HR = Home runs; RBI = Runs batted in; SB = Stolen bases; BB = Walks; AVG = Batting average; SLG = Slugging average

| Player | G | AB | R | H | 2B | 3B | HR | RBI | SB | BB | AVG | SLG |
|---|---|---|---|---|---|---|---|---|---|---|---|---|
| Evan Longoria | 160 | 633 | 81 | 173 | 41 | 4 | 36 | 98 | 0 | 42 | .273 | .521 |
| Brad Miller | 152 | 548 | 73 | 133 | 29 | 6 | 30 | 81 | 6 | 47 | .243 | .482 |
| Logan Forsythe | 127 | 511 | 76 | 135 | 24 | 4 | 20 | 52 | 6 | 46 | .264 | .444 |
| Corey Dickerson | 148 | 510 | 57 | 125 | 36 | 3 | 24 | 70 | 0 | 33 | .245 | .469 |
| Steven Souza Jr. | 120 | 430 | 58 | 106 | 17 | 1 | 17 | 49 | 7 | 31 | .247 | .409 |
| Kevin Kiermaier | 105 | 366 | 55 | 90 | 20 | 2 | 12 | 37 | 21 | 40 | .246 | .410 |
| Logan Morrison | 107 | 353 | 45 | 84 | 18 | 1 | 14 | 43 | 4 | 37 | .238 | .414 |
| Curt Casali | 84 | 226 | 23 | 42 | 10 | 0 | 8 | 25 | 0 | 25 | .186 | .336 |
| Brandon Guyer | 63 | 212 | 27 | 51 | 12 | 1 | 7 | 18 | 2 | 12 | .241 | .406 |
| Steve Pearce | 60 | 204 | 26 | 63 | 11 | 1 | 10 | 29 | 0 | 26 | .309 | .520 |
| Desmond Jennings | 65 | 200 | 22 | 40 | 7 | 1 | 7 | 20 | 2 | 21 | .200 | .350 |
| Tim Beckham | 64 | 198 | 25 | 49 | 12 | 5 | 5 | 16 | 2 | 14 | .247 | .434 |
| Mikie Mahtook | 65 | 185 | 16 | 36 | 9 | 0 | 3 | 11 | 0 | 7 | .195 | .292 |
| Nick Franklin | 60 | 174 | 18 | 47 | 10 | 1 | 6 | 26 | 6 | 12 | .270 | .443 |
| Hank Conger | 49 | 124 | 6 | 24 | 5 | 0 | 3 | 10 | 0 | 12 | .194 | .306 |
| Luke Maile | 42 | 119 | 10 | 27 | 7 | 0 | 3 | 15 | 0 | 4 | .227 | .361 |
| Bobby Wilson | 28 | 87 | 14 | 20 | 2 | 0 | 4 | 9 | 0 | 5 | .230 | .391 |
| Taylor Motter | 33 | 80 | 11 | 15 | 3 | 0 | 2 | 9 | 0 | 11 | .188 | .300 |
| Matt Duffy | 21 | 76 | 9 | 21 | 3 | 0 | 1 | 7 | 0 | 3 | .276 | .355 |
| Alexei Ramírez | 17 | 57 | 5 | 14 | 3 | 0 | 1 | 7 | 2 | 4 | .246 | .351 |
| Oswaldo Arcia | 21 | 54 | 7 | 14 | 2 | 1 | 2 | 7 | 1 | 6 | .259 | .444 |
| Jaff Decker | 19 | 52 | 1 | 8 | 1 | 0 | 0 | 1 | 1 | 4 | .154 | .173 |
| Richie Shaffer | 20 | 48 | 5 | 12 | 6 | 0 | 1 | 4 | 0 | 5 | .250 | .438 |
| Juniel Querecuto | 4 | 11 | 1 | 1 | 0 | 1 | 0 | 2 | 0 | 0 | .091 | .273 |
| Pitcher totals | 162 | 23 | 1 | 3 | 0 | 0 | 0 | 1 | 0 | 2 | .130 | .130 |
| Team totals | 162 | 5481 | 672 | 1333 | 288 | 32 | 216 | 647 | 60 | 449 | .243 | .426 |

=== Pitching ===
Note: W = Wins; L = Losses; ERA = Earned run average; G = Games pitched; GS = Games started; SV = Saves; IP = Innings pitched; H = Hits allowed; R = Runs allowed; ER = Earned runs allowed; BB = Walks allowed; SO = Strikeouts

| Player | W | L | ERA | G | GS | SV | IP | H | R | ER | BB | SO |
|---|---|---|---|---|---|---|---|---|---|---|---|---|
| Chris Archer | 9 | 19 | 4.02 | 33 | 33 | 0 | 201.1 | 183 | 100 | 90 | 67 | 233 |
| Jake Odorizzi | 10 | 6 | 3.69 | 33 | 33 | 0 | 187.2 | 170 | 80 | 77 | 54 | 166 |
| Drew Smyly | 7 | 12 | 4.88 | 30 | 30 | 0 | 175.1 | 174 | 103 | 95 | 49 | 167 |
| Matt Moore | 7 | 7 | 4.08 | 21 | 21 | 0 | 130.0 | 125 | 62 | 59 | 40 | 109 |
| Matt Andriese | 8 | 8 | 4.37 | 29 | 19 | 1 | 127.2 | 131 | 64 | 62 | 25 | 109 |
| Erasmo Ramírez | 7 | 11 | 3.77 | 64 | 1 | 2 | 90.2 | 90 | 39 | 38 | 26 | 63 |
| Blake Snell | 6 | 8 | 3.54 | 19 | 19 | 0 | 89.0 | 93 | 44 | 35 | 51 | 98 |
| Alex Colomé | 2 | 4 | 1.91 | 57 | 0 | 37 | 56.2 | 43 | 12 | 12 | 15 | 71 |
| Enny Romero | 2 | 0 | 5.91 | 52 | 0 | 1 | 45.2 | 42 | 31 | 30 | 28 | 50 |
| Xavier Cedeño | 3 | 4 | 3.70 | 54 | 0 | 0 | 41.1 | 36 | 17 | 17 | 13 | 43 |
| Ryan Garton | 1 | 2 | 4.35 | 37 | 0 | 1 | 39.1 | 44 | 20 | 19 | 11 | 33 |
| Danny Farquhar | 1 | 0 | 3.06 | 35 | 0 | 0 | 35.1 | 33 | 14 | 12 | 15 | 46 |
| Steve Geltz | 0 | 2 | 5.74 | 27 | 0 | 0 | 26.2 | 24 | 17 | 17 | 9 | 23 |
| Brad Boxberger | 4 | 3 | 4.81 | 27 | 0 | 0 | 24.1 | 23 | 13 | 13 | 19 | 22 |
| Dana Eveland | 0 | 1 | 9.00 | 33 | 0 | 0 | 23.0 | 32 | 23 | 23 | 19 | 21 |
| Alex Cobb | 1 | 2 | 8.59 | 5 | 5 | 0 | 22.0 | 32 | 22 | 21 | 7 | 16 |
| Kevin Jepsen | 0 | 1 | 5.68 | 25 | 0 | 0 | 19.0 | 20 | 13 | 12 | 9 | 13 |
| Tyler Sturdevant | 0 | 1 | 3.93 | 16 | 0 | 0 | 18.1 | 18 | 8 | 8 | 6 | 14 |
| Ryan Webb | 0 | 0 | 5.19 | 18 | 0 | 0 | 17.1 | 27 | 11 | 10 | 3 | 11 |
| Dylan Floro | 0 | 1 | 4.20 | 12 | 0 | 0 | 15.0 | 23 | 8 | 7 | 5 | 14 |
| Chase Whitley | 0 | 0 | 2.51 | 5 | 1 | 0 | 14.1 | 13 | 7 | 4 | 3 | 15 |
| Eddie Gamboa | 0 | 2 | 1.35 | 7 | 0 | 0 | 13.1 | 9 | 3 | 2 | 8 | 11 |
| Justin Marks | 0 | 0 | 1.00 | 4 | 0 | 0 | 9.0 | 7 | 1 | 1 | 9 | 6 |
| Jhan Mariñez | 0 | 0 | 2.45 | 3 | 0 | 0 | 3.2 | 2 | 1 | 1 | 0 | 3 |
| Taylor Motter | 0 | 0 | 0.00 | 1 | 0 | 0 | 0.1 | 1 | 0 | 0 | 0 | 0 |
| Team totals | 68 | 94 | 4.20 | 162 | 162 | 42 | 1426.1 | 1395 | 713 | 665 | 491 | 1357 |

== Farm system ==
| Level | Team | League | Manager |
|---|---|---|---|
| AAA | Durham Bulls | International League | Jared Sandberg |
| AA | Montgomery Biscuits | Southern League | Brady Williams |
| A-Advanced | Charlotte Stone Crabs | Florida State League | Michael Johns |
| A | Bowling Green Hot Rods | Midwest League | Reinaldo Ruiz |
| A-Short Season | Hudson Valley Renegades | New York–Penn League | Tim Parenton |
| Rookie | Princeton Rays | Appalachian League | Danny Sheaffer |
| Rookie | GCL Rays | Gulf Coast League | Jim Morrison |
| Rookie | DSL Rays | Dominican Summer League | Julio Zorrilla |
