= Bowling Green Hot Rods =

American Minor League baseball team

- Founded in 2009; Bowling Green, Kentucky
Team logo
Cap insignia

Minor league affiliations
- Class: High-A (2021–present)
- League: South Atlantic League (2021–present)
- Division: South Division
- Previous leagues: Midwest League (2010–2020); South Atlantic League (2009)

Major league affiliations
- Team: Tampa Bay Rays (2009–present)

Minor league titles
- League titles (4): 2018; 2021; 2022; 2024
- Division titles (5): 2007; 2018; 2021; 2022; 2024
- First-half titles (5): 2011; 2018; 2022; 2025; 2026
- Second-half titles (3): 2024; 2025; 2026

Team data
- Name: Bowling Green Hot Rods (2009–present)
- Colors: Navy blue, orange, white
- Ballpark: Bowling Green Ballpark (2009–present)
- Owner/ Operator: Jack Blackstock
- General manager: Kyle Wolz
- Manager: Rafael Valenzuela
- Website: milb.com/bowling-green

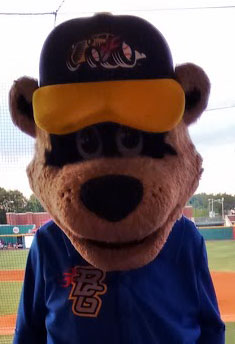
Axle

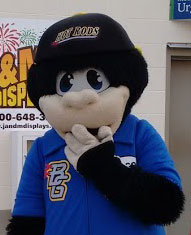
Roscoe

Axle and Roscoe, the Hot Rods' mascots

The Bowling Green Hot Rods are a Minor League Baseball team of the South Atlantic League and the High-A affiliate of the Tampa Bay Rays. They are located in Bowling Green, Kentucky, and play their home games at Bowling Green Ballpark, which opened in 2009. The team is named for the city's connections to the automotive and racing industries such as the National Corvette Museum, Holley Carburetor, Beech Bend Raceway, and the Bowling Green Assembly Plant.

Founded in 2009, they were members of the Class A South Atlantic League in their inaugural season and played in the Class A Midwest League from 2010 to 2020. There were elevated to the High-A classification and placed in the High-A East in 2021, which restored the South Atlantic League name in 2022.

== History ==
The Hot Rods began life as the Wilmington Waves, one of two South Atlantic League expansion teams for the 2001 season. However, the Waves' stay at Brooks Field in Wilmington, North Carolina, lasted but a single season. They became the South Georgia Waves when the team was moved to the Paul Eames Sports Complex in Albany, Georgia, for the 2002 season. The team retained the moniker name when it again moved to Golden Park in Columbus, Georgia, just before the 2003 campaign. One year later, in 2004, the franchise changed names and became the Columbus Catfish.

In April 2008, ownership moved the team to Bowling Green effective for the 2009 season under the new nickname "Hot Rods." Their first manager as the Hot Rods was Matt Quatraro.

In 2010, the Hot Rods and the Lake County Captains moved from the South Atlantic League to the Midwest League, a plan meant to alleviate travel expenses associated with routine road trips as well as player movement within the teams' respective organizations.

In December 2013, Art Solomon, owner of the Hot Rods for five years, sold the team to Manhattan Capital Sports headed by Stuart Katzoff. The Hot Rods have been widely recognized for their promotional efforts. In 2009, the team's "What Could've Been Night" was named Promotion of the Year by MiLB.com. In 2010, Hot Rods Assistant General Manager Greg Coleman was honored as Marketer of the Year by the Professional Marketing Association.

In September 2018, the team was sold to Jack Blackstock who had previously been a minority investor in the team.

That year, the Hot Rods won 90 games and captured their first ever Midwest League title, under then manager Craig Albernaz.

Along with Major League Baseball's reorganization of the minors after the 2020 season, the Hot Rods were invited to remain a Tampa Bay affiliate but be elevated to High-A in 2021 as members of the High-A East. They won the Southern Division title by ending the season with a first-place 82–36 record. They then won the High-A East championship by defeating the Greensboro Grasshoppers, 3–2, in a best-of-five series. Jeff Smith won the league's Manager of the Year Award. In 2022, the High-A East became known as the South Atlantic League, the name historically used by the regional circuit prior to the 2021 reorganization.

Head Coach Jeff Smith led the Hot Rods to a second straight SAL championships in 2022. After narrowly missing the playoffs in 2023, Head Coach Rafael Valenzuela lead the Hot Rods to an SAL championship in 2024.

=== Season records ===
Season	Affiliation	Manager	Record
2009	Rays	Matt Quatraro	64–75, 3rd place South
2010	Rays	Brady Williams	61–78, 6th place East
2011	Rays	Brady Williams	77–63, 3rd place East
2012	Rays	Brady Williams	80–60, 2nd place East
2013	Rays	Jared Sandberg	82–56, 1st place East
2014	Rays	Michael Johns	61–77, 8th place East
2015	Rays	Reinaldo Ruiz	69–69, 6th place East
2016	Rays	Reinaldo Ruiz	84–55, 1st place East (tie)
2017	Rays	Reinaldo Ruiz	72–65, 3rd place East
2018	Rays	Craig Albernaz	90–49, 1st place East
2019	Rays	Reinaldo Ruiz	81–58, 2nd place East
2020	Rays	Season cancelled (COVID-19 pandemic)	
2021	Rays	Jeff Smith	82–36, 1st place South
2022	Rays	Jeff Smith	78–52, 1st place South
2023	Rays	Rafael Valenzuela	69–57, 2nd place South
2024	Rays	Rafael Valenzuela	75–54, 1st place South
2025	Rays	Rafael Valenzuela	69–61, 1st place South

== Playoffs ==
Season	Quarterfinals	Semifinals	Finals
2009	-	-	-
2010	-	-	-
2011	L, 2–0, Fort Wayne	-	-
2012	L, 2–0, Lake County	-	-
2013	L, 2–0, Fort Wayne	-	-
2014	-	-	-
2015	-	-	-
2016	L, 2–1, Great Lakes	-	-
2017	L, 2–0, Fort Wayne	-	-
2018	W, 2–0, Lansing	W, 2–0, West Michigan	W, 3–1, Peoria
2019	L, 2–0, South Bend	-	-
2020	-	-	-
2021	-	-	W, 3–2, Greensboro
2022	–	W, 2–1, Rome	W, 2–1, Aberdeen
2023	–	–	–
2024	–	W, 2–0 Rome	W, 2–1 Hudson Valley
2025	–	L, 2–0 Hub City	

== Bowling Green Ballpark ==
- Address: 300 E 8th Ave, Bowling Green, KY 42101
- Opened: April 17, 2009
- Seating capacity: 4,559
- Dimensions: LF – 318 ft, CF – 400 ft, RF – 326 ft

Bowling Green Ballpark was designed by architectural firm DLR Group. The right-centerfield wall in Bowling Green Ballpark is unique in that it is concave in right-center because of the shape of a pre-existing road behind the field. The scoreboard in right-centerfield measures 35-feet tall and 56-feet wide, with the ability to show scoring, live video, advertisements, player statistics, and more. Embedded in the left field wall is a 6-foot, 3inch tall by 68-foot wide LED display board, behind which is a picnic area. There are two grass lawn seating areas- one in left-center and one at the right field line. The kids play area boasts an inflatable car customized with the Hot Rods' logo, a carousel, and a playground, and a behind the batter's eye in centerfield, a splash-pad. The Performance Food Service Club is a bar located on suite level directly behind home plate. Also on the suite level are 10 suites, the Hall of Fame suite, and a party deck—The Coca-Cola Deck.

== Media coverage ==
In addition to internet streaming coverage on MILB.tv, the Hot Rods are broadcast locally on radio station WKCT AM 930 and translator W281BV (104.1 FM) since 2022. WBGN was the original flagship station of Hot Rods baseball for the team's first 12 years in Bowling Green from 2009 to 2021.

== Mascots ==
Axle, an anthropomorphic bear, is one of the Hot Rods' mascots. Debuting in 2009, Axle wears an orange Hot Rods uniform, number 00. The Hot Rods' furry, fun-loving bear has entertained crowds at Bowling Green Ballpark while making good on his promise to become a true community ambassador. Roscoe, the Hot Rods' second mascot, debuted during the 2010 season. Roscoe is a Grease Monkey, who wears a navy Hot Rods jersey.

Turbo is a Golden Retriever who was adopted into the Hot Rods family on December 13, 2019. He is currently training to become a "batdog", retrieving bats and balls and returning them to the Hot Rods' dugout, as well as delivering balls to the home plate umpire, for the 2021 season. Turbo is one of a few bat dogs in Minor League Baseball.

== Roster ==
Bowling Green Hot Rods roster
Players		Coaches/Other
Pitchers: 2 Ryan Andrade; 35 Noah Beal; 27 Jadon Bercovich; 25 Alexander Campos; 38 Cade Citelli; 12 Kaleb Corbett; 32 Dominic Fritton; 5 Garrett Gainey; 34 Andres Galan; 21 Trevor Harrison; 18 Jacob Hartlaub; 33 Blake Morgan; 29 Mason Nichols; 28 Dominic Niman; 33 Trey Pooser; 11 Andy Rodriguez; 9 Jonathan Russell; 13 Jose Urbina	Catchers: 20 Nathan Flewelling; Infielders: 1 Nicandro Aybar; 26 Ryan Cermak; 16 Carlos Colmenarez; 8 Felix Cotes; 9 Ricardo Gonzalez; 22 Larry Martinez; 31 Ryan McCoy; 7 Jose Perez; 6 Narciso Polanco; 15 Tony Santa Maria; Outfielders: 14 Jhon Diaz; 23 Noah Myers; 30 Brendan Summerhill	Manager: 10 Rafael Valenzuela; Coaches: 41 Ryan Pennell (pitching); 4 Perry Roth (bench); 24 Brett Schneider (hitting); 60-day injured list: 16 Anderson Brito; 25 Jack Kartsonas; -- Chandler Murphy; 17 Marshall Toole; 7-day injured list; * On Tampa Bay Rays 40-man roster; ~ Development list; # Rehab assignment; ∞ Reserve list; ‡ Restricted list; § Suspended list; † Temporarily inactive list; Roster updated October 19, 2026; Transactions; → More rosters: MiLB • South Atlantic League; → Tampa Bay Rays minor league players

== Alumni ==
The following are players in Major League Baseball who played, at one time, for the Hot Rods. Players are listed under the team they debuted for.

Tampa Bay Rays

- Matt Moore
- Alex Colome
- Tim Beckham
- Enny Romero
- Kevin Kiermaier
- CJ Riefenhauser
- Kirby Yates
- Ryan Brett
- Andrew Bellatti
- Luke Maile
- Blake Snell
- Taylor Motter
- Ryan Garton
- Dylan Floro
- Juniel Querecuto
- Austin Pruitt
- Jose Alvarado
- Ryne Stanek
- Hunter Wood
- Jacob Faria
- Yonny Chirinos
- Johnny Field
- Willy Adames
- Jaime Schultz
- Diego Castillo
- Justin Williams
- Brandon Lowe
- Nick Ciuffo
- Nate Lowe
- Michael Brosseau
- Brendan McKay
- Ian Gibaut
- Kean Wong
- Josh Fleming
- Shane McClanahan
- Kevin Padlo
- Brent Honeywell Jr.
- Taylor Walls
- Wander Franco
- Vidal Brujan
- Joshua Lowe
- Shane Baz

San Francisco Giants

- Albert Suarez
- Roberto Gomez
- Enderson Franco
- Joe McCarthy
- Sam Long

Arizona Diamondbacks

- Oscar Hernandez
- Merrill Kelly

Detroit Tigers

- Kyle Lobstein
- Ryan Carpenter

Los Angeles Angels

- Luis Rengifo
- Matt Ramsey
- Kenny Rosenberg

Texas Rangers

- Kyle Bird
- Brock Burke

Miami Marlins

- Derek Dietrich
- Jesús Sánchez

St. Louis Cardinals

- Genesis Cabrera
- Roel Ramirez

Kansas City Royals

- Wilking Rodriguez

San Diego Padres

- Chris Rearick
- Jake Cronenworth

Washington Nationals

- Felipe Vazquez

Baltimore Orioles

- Joey Rickard

Philadelphia Phillies

- Tyler Goeddel
- Cristopher Sánchez

Los Angeles Dodgers

- Andrew Toles

Colorado Rockies

- German Marquez

Toronto Blue Jays

- Taylor Guerrieri

Seattle Mariners

- Parker Markel

Oakland Athletics

- Jonah Heim

Minnesota Twins

- Joe Ryan

Cincinnati Reds

- Riley O'Brien

New York Mets

- Jake Hager
