= Luis Rengifo =

Venezuelan baseball player (born 1997)

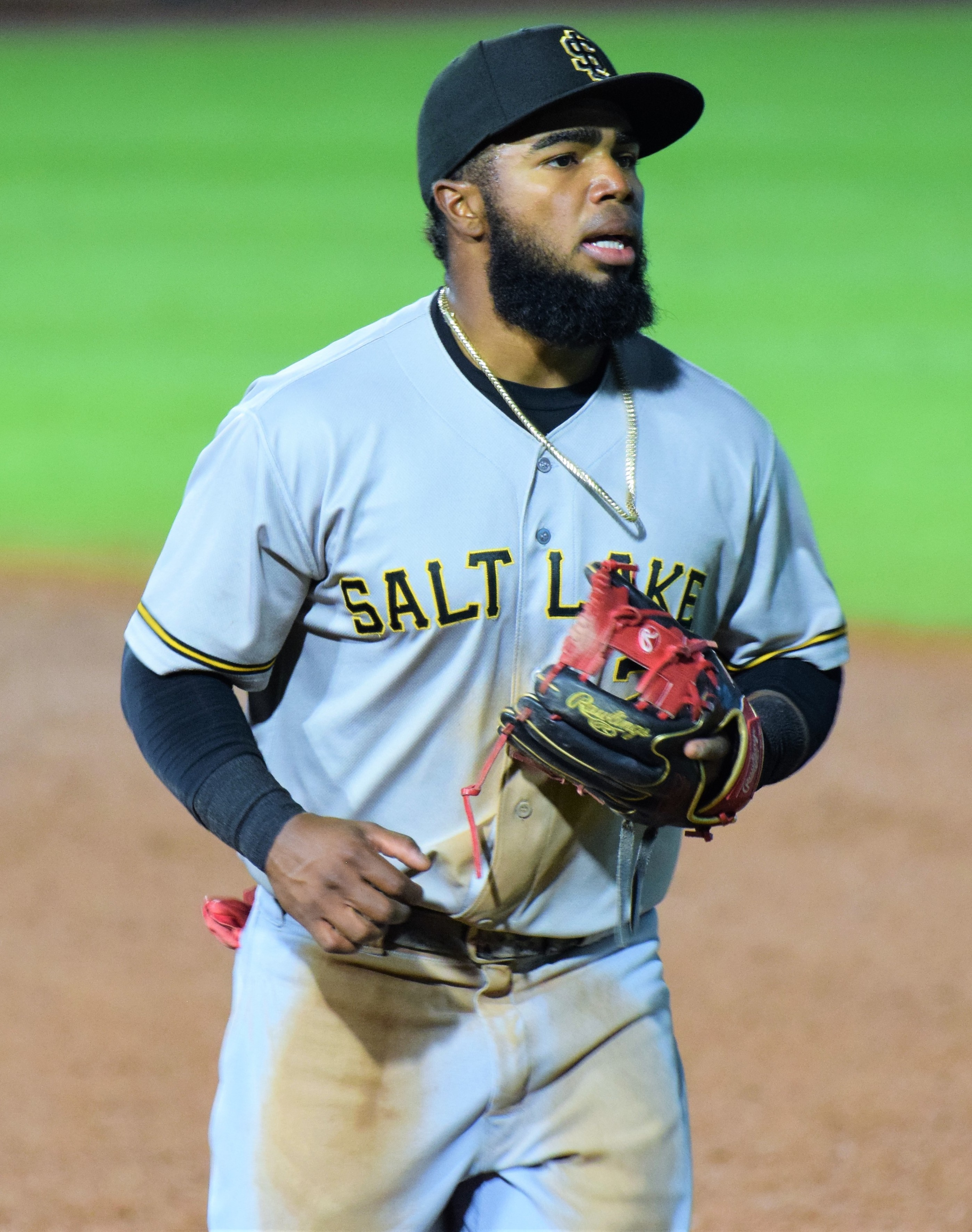
- Rengifo with the Salt Lake Bees in 2022

Free agent
- Infielder
- Born: February 26, 1997 (age 29); Naguanagua, Venezuela
- Bats: Switch Throws: Right

MLB debut
- April 25, 2019, for the Los Angeles Angels

MLB statistics (through 2026 season)
- Batting average: .248
- Home runs: 66
- Runs batted in: 266
- Stats at Baseball Reference

Teams
- Los Angeles Angels (2019–2025); Milwaukee Brewers (2026); San Diego Padres (2026)

Luis Jose Rengifo (born February 26, 1997) is a Venezuelan professional baseball infielder who is a free agent. He has played in Major League Baseball (MLB) for the Los Angeles Angels, Milwaukee Brewers, and San Diego Padres. He made his MLB debut in 2019.

== Career ==
=== Seattle Mariners ===
Rengifo signed with the Seattle Mariners as an international free agent in March 2014. He made his professional debut that year with the Venezuelan Summer League Mariners, batting .198 with one home run and 20 runs batted-in in 64 games. He played 2015 with the Dominican Summer League Mariners where he slashed .336/.405/.465 with two home runs, 35 runs batted in, and 19 stolen bases in 60 games, 2016 with the Arizona League Mariners where he hit .239 in 34 games, and started 2017 with the Clinton LumberKings.

=== Tampa Bay Rays ===
On August 6, 2017, the Mariners traded Rengifo along with Anthony Misiewicz and a player to be named later (Osmy Gregorio), to the Tampa Bay Rays for Mike Marjama and Ryan Garton. He finished the season with the Bowling Green Hot Rods. In 125 games between Clinton and Bowling Green, he hit .250 with 12 home runs, 52 runs batted in, and 34 stolen bases.

=== Los Angeles Angels ===
On March 20, 2018, Rengifo was acquired by the Los Angeles Angels as the player to be named later from the Tampa Bay Rays in the C.J. Cron trade. He started the season with the Inland Empire 66ers and was promoted to the Mobile BayBears and Salt Lake Bees during the season. In 127 games between the three clubs, he hit .299/.399/.452 with seven home runs, 64 runs batted in, 41 stolen bases, and 109 runs scored.

On November 20, 2018, the Angels added Rengifo to their 40-man roster to protect him from the Rule 5 draft. He began 2019 back with Salt Lake. On April 25, he was called up to the major league roster, and made his major league debut that night. He finished the season hitting .238 with seven home runs and 33 runs batted in during 108 games.

In early 2020, Rengifo was nearly traded to the Los Angeles Dodgers along with Taylor Ward and an unnamed prospect in exchange for Joc Pederson, Ross Stripling, and Andy Pages, but the trade fell through. Rengifo began the season as the Angels' primary second baseman but struggled and was sent down to the minors. He finished with a .156 batting average in 33 games. Rengifo played in 54 games for the Angels in 2021, slashing .201/.246/.310 with six home runs and 18 RBI.

On September 16, 2022, Rengifo recorded his first multi-home run game, in an 8–7 home victory over his former organization, the Seattle Mariners. He went 3–for–5, hit a solo home run off of starter Robbie Ray as a right-handed batter, and hit a 3-run shot off reliever Matt Festa as a left-handed batter. In 2022 he batted .264/.294/.429. He walked in 3.3% of his plate appearances, the lowest percentage of all qualified major league batters. 15.8% of pitches thrown to him were curveballs, the highest such percentage in the majors.

In 2023, Rengifo enjoyed a career year that saw him play in 126 games and hit .264/.339/.444 with 16 home runs, 51 RBI, and 6 stolen bases. On September 5, 2023, Rengifo was named the American League Player of the Week after he batted went 11–for–25 (.440) with a 1.207 OPS, 3 home runs, and 7 RBI in the week. On September 7, Rengifo suffered a ruptured biceps tendon while taking practice swings in the on–deck circle during a game against the Cleveland Guardians. Two days later, he was placed on the injured list, and it was announced that he would miss the remainder of the season as a result of the injury.

Rengifo played in 78 games for Los Angeles in 2024, hitting .300/.347/.417 with six home runs, 30 RBI, and 24 stolen bases. On August 6, 2024, it was announced that Rengifo would miss the remainder of the season after undergoing wrist surgery.

Rengifo made 147 appearances for Los Angeles during the 2025 campaign, compiling a .238/.287/.335 slash line with nine home runs, 43 RBI, and 10 stolen bases.

=== Milwaukee Brewers ===
On February 16, 2026, Rengifo signed a one-year, $3.5 million contract with the Milwaukee Brewers that also included a $10 million mutual option for 2027. He made 57 appearances for the Brewers, batting .205/.280/.254 with 19 RBI and three stolen bases. On June 16, 2026, Rengifo was designated for assignment by Milwaukee following the promotion of Cooper Pratt. The Brewers released Rengifo on June 23.

=== San Diego Padres ===
On June 26, 2026, Rengifo signed a minor league contract with the San Diego Padres. He made six appearances for the Triple–A El Paso Chihuahuas, going 8–for–25 (.320) with two home runs, seven RBI, and two stolen bases. On July 8, the Padres selected Rengifo's contract, adding him to their active roster. On August 11, Rengifo hit his first career grand slam in an 11–2 victory over the Milwaukee Brewers. He made 38 appearances for San Diego, batting .291/.375/.409 with four home runs, 17 RBI, and three stolen bases. On August 31, Rengifo was ruled out for the remainder of the season due to a torn ACL and sprained MCL, which he suffered in a game against the Tampa Bay Rays two days prior.

== Personal life ==
On September 16, 2021, it was reported that Rengifo had been charged by Venezuelan authorities with forging divorce documents and selling property without his ex-wife's consent. The incident allegedly happened in July 2019, with the documents being legalized in December 2020. Rengifo's father, sister and lawyer were arrested and detained that same day. An arrest warrant was issued for Rengifo, although it was not immediately clear if extradition would be requested.
