= Anthony Misiewicz =

American baseball player (born 1994)

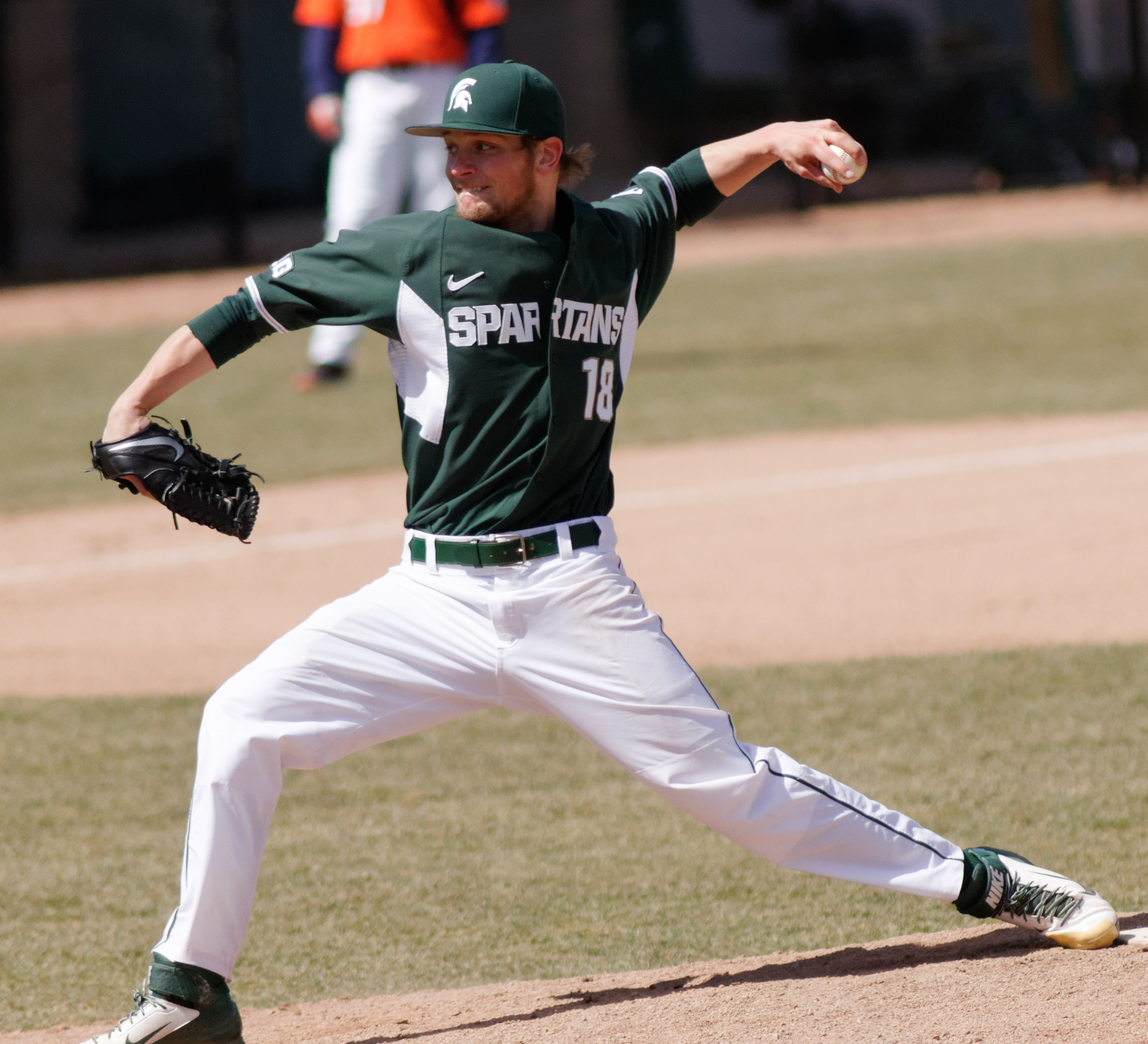
- Misiewicz at Michigan State in 2015

Free agent
- Pitcher
- Born: November 1, 1994 (age 32); Detroit, Michigan, U.S.
- Bats: Right Throws: Left

MLB debut
- July 24, 2020, for the Seattle Mariners

MLB statistics (through 2025 season)
- Win–loss record: 8–9
- Earned run average: 4.86
- Strikeouts: 119
- Stats at Baseball Reference

Teams
- Seattle Mariners (2020–2022); Kansas City Royals (2022); Arizona Diamondbacks (2023); Detroit Tigers (2023); New York Yankees (2023–2024); Minnesota Twins (2025)

Anthony Misiewicz (/mɪˈsɛvɪtʃ/ mih-SEV-itch; born November 1, 1994) is an American professional baseball pitcher who is a free agent. He has previously played in Major League Baseball (MLB) for the Seattle Mariners, Kansas City Royals, Arizona Diamondbacks, Detroit Tigers, New York Yankees, and Minnesota Twins.

== Career ==
=== Amateur career ===
Misiewicz graduated from Anchor Bay High School in New Baltimore, Michigan. He attended Michigan State University, where he played college baseball for the Michigan State Spartans. In 2015, his junior year, he had a 5–4 win–loss record with a 3.80 earned run average (ERA) in 18 games (eight games started). After the season, he briefly played collegiate summer baseball with the Cotuit Kettleers of the Cape Cod Baseball League.

=== Seattle Mariners ===
The Seattle Mariners selected Misiewicz in the 18th round of the 2015 MLB draft. He signed with the Mariners for a $70,000 signing bonus rather than returning to Michigan State for his senior year. After signing, Misiewicz made his professional debut with the Everett AquaSox, going 3–2 with a 2.14 ERA in 46 1/3 innings pitched. In 2016, he pitched for the Bakersfield Blaze, compiling a 7–10 record with a 4.79 ERA in 29 starts. He began 2017 with Modesto Nuts before being promoted to the Arkansas Travelers.

=== Tampa Bay Rays ===
On August 6, 2017, the Mariners traded Misiewicz, Luis Rengifo, and a player to be named later to the Tampa Bay Rays in exchange for Mike Marjama and Ryan Garton. He was assigned to the Montgomery Biscuits. In 28 total starts between Modesto, Arkansas, and Montgomery, he went 11–6 with a 4.51 ERA.

=== Seattle Mariners (second stint) ===
On December 13, 2017, the Seattle Mariners reacquired Misiewicz from the Rays for an international signing bonus slot. In 2018, he returned to play for Arkansas, pitching to a 3–12 record and 5.51 ERA in 21 starts. He missed nearly a month during the season due to injury. Misiewicz began 2019 with Arkansas before being promoted to the Tacoma Rainiers. Over 26 games (24 starts), he went 9–8 with a 4.59 ERA, striking out 125 over 131 1/3 innings.

On July 24, 2020, Misiewicz made his major league debut against the Houston Astros, giving up one run in one inning. For the season, he was 0–2 with a 4.05 ERA. On July 31, 2022, Misiewicz was designated for assignment.

=== Kansas City Royals ===
On August 1, 2022, Misiewicz was traded to the Kansas City Royals for cash considerations. He appeared in 15 games for the Royals down the stretch, logging a 1–1 record and 4.11 ERA with 19 strikeouts in 15.1 innings pitched.

On February 3, 2023, Misiewicz was designated for assignment by Kansas City after the signing of Zack Greinke was made official.

=== St Louis Cardinals ===
On February 8, 2023, Misiewicz was traded to the St. Louis Cardinals in exchange for cash considerations. Misiewicz was optioned to the Triple-A Memphis Redbirds to begin the 2023 season. On March 29, Misiewicz was designated for assignment to clear roster space for Jordan Walker.

=== Arizona Diamondbacks ===
On March 31, 2023, Misiewicz was traded to the Arizona Diamondbacks in exchange for cash considerations. Misiewicz made 7 appearances for Arizona, logging a 5.63 ERA with 6 strikeouts in 8.0 innings pitched. He would later miss three weeks with a calf strain, and was optioned to the Triple–A Reno Aces upon being activated on June 10. On June 12, Misiewicz was designated for assignment by the Diamondbacks after Joe Mantiply was activated from the injured list.

=== Detroit Tigers ===
On June 18, 2023, the Detroit Tigers claimed Misiewicz off of waivers and optioned him to the Triple-A Toledo Mud Hens. On June 27, Tigers recalled Misiewicz to Detroit to replace Will Vest, who was placed on the injured list. After giving up three runs on four hits and only recording one out, he was optioned back to Toledo the next day. He was designated for assignment on June 29 following the promotion of Zach Logue. On July 1, Misiewicz cleared waivers and was sent outright to Triple–A Toledo.

=== New York Yankees ===
On July 6, 2023, the New York Yankees claimed Misiewicz off of waivers and optioned him to the Triple–A Scranton/Wilkes-Barre RailRiders. The Yankees promoted him to the major leagues on September 10. On September 15, Misiewicz was struck in the head by a line drive off the bat of Pittsburgh Pirates infielder Ji-hwan Bae. He was subsequently placed on the injured list after being released from the hospital. Misiewicz was non-tendered and became a free agent on November 17.

On December 7, 2023, Misiewicz re-signed with the Yankees on a minor league contract. In 23 games for Triple–A Scranton, he recorded a 3.23 ERA with 37 strikeouts and 4 saves across 30 2/3 innings pitched. On June 18, 2024, the Yankees selected Misiewicz's contract, adding him to their active roster. He made only one scoreless appearance for New York, and was designated for assignment on September 9. Misiewicz cleared waivers and was sent outright to Scranton on September 12. Misiewicz elected free agency on October 31.

=== Minnesota Twins ===
On January 18, 2025, Misiewicz signed a minor league contract with the Minnesota Twins. In 26 appearances for the Triple-A St. Paul Saints, he posted a 2-2 record and 4.02 ERA with 29 strikeouts and eight saves across 31 1/3 innings pitched. On July 9, the Twins selected Misiewicz's contract, adding him to their active roster. In five appearances for Minnesota, he struggled to a 9.64 ERA with five strikeouts across 4 2/3 innings pitched. On November 6, Misiewicz was removed from the 40-man roster and sent outright to St. Paul; he subsequently rejected the assignment and elected free agency.

=== Cincinnati Reds ===
On January 22, 2026, Misiewicz signed a minor league contract with the Cincinnati Reds. In 32 games for the Triple-A Louisville Bats, he posted a 2-0 record and 1.95 ERA with 24 strikeouts across 32 1/3 innings pitched. On July 17, Misiewicz was released by the Reds. On July 21, he re-signed with the Reds on a new minor league contract. He elected free agency on November 2.
