= Mike Marjama =

American baseball player (born 1989)

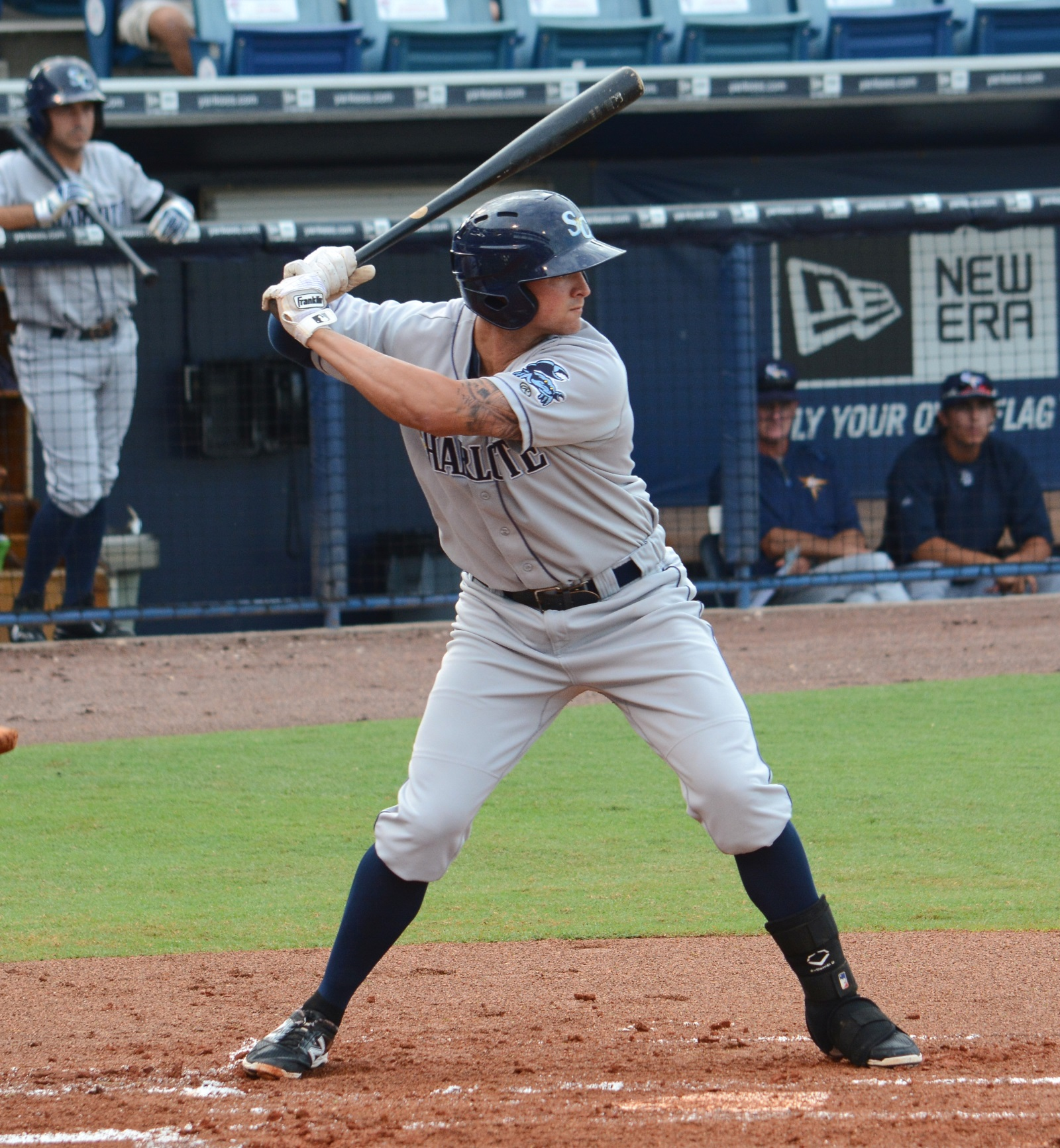
- Marjama with the Charlotte Stone Crabs in 2015
- Catcher
- Born: July 20, 1989 (age 36); Roseville, California, U.S.
- Batted: Right Threw: Right

MLB debut
- September 3, 2017, for the Seattle Mariners

Last MLB appearance
- April 18, 2018, for the Seattle Mariners

Career statistics
- Batting average: .167
- Home runs: 1
- Runs batted in: 1
- Stats at Baseball Reference

Teams
- Seattle Mariners (2017–2018)

Michael Gregory Marjama (born July 20, 1989) is an American former professional baseball catcher and current coach. He played in Major League Baseball (MLB) for the Seattle Mariners and in college baseball for the Long Beach State Dirtbags.

== Playing career ==
=== Amateur ===
Marjama attended Granite Bay High School in Granite Bay, California, and graduated in 2007. He played for the school's baseball team as a second baseman, due to his small size. During his senior year, Marjama had a .414 batting average with only three strikeouts in 109 plate appearances for the school's baseball team.

He enrolled at Sacramento City College to play for their college baseball team. He took a redshirt in his first year, and played for the school's team for two years. He had a .317 batting average in 74 games played across his two seasons with the Sacramento City Panthers, including a .345 batting average in his second season. In 2010, he played collegiate summer baseball for the La Crosse Loggers of the Northwoods League. Marjama batted .286 with two home runs and 37 runs batted in (RBIs) in 69 games played for La Crosse, and was named a Northwoods League All-Star.

Marjama then transferred to California State University, Long Beach, where he played college baseball for the Long Beach State Dirtbags in 2011. As their starting third baseman, he had a .290 batting average in 56 games. In 2011, he played collegiate summer baseball with the Orleans Firebirds of the Cape Cod Baseball League.

=== Chicago White Sox ===
The Chicago White Sox selected Marjama in the 23rd round of the 2011 Major League Baseball draft. He made his professional debut with the Bristol White Sox of the Rookie-level Appalachian League in 2011, where he batted .221 with seven RBIs in 24 games. In 2012, the White Sox converted Marjama into a catcher. He began the 2012 season with the Great Falls Voyagers of the Rookie-level Pioneer League, where he played in nine games, and was then promoted to the Kannapolis Intimidators of the Single-A South Atlantic League. He finished the season with a .289 batting average with two home runs and 17 RBIs for Great Falls and Kannapolis. Marjama returned to Kannapolis in 2013. He batted .277 with six home runs and 46 RBI in 97 games for Kannapolis that year. He played for the Winston-Salem Dash of High-A Carolina League in 2014, and finished the season with a .266 batting average in 70 games.

=== Tampa Bay Rays ===
On January 29, 2015, the White Sox traded Marjama to the Tampa Bay Rays in exchange for a player to be named later or cash considerations. Marjama played for the Charlotte Stone Crabs of the High-A Florida State League in 2015, and compiled a .302 batting average, nine home runs, and 52 RBI, all career highs. He played for the Montgomery Biscuits of the Double-A Southern League in 2016. He batted .286 with five home runs for the Biscuits.

Playing for the Durham Bulls of the Triple-A International League in 2017, Marjama was selected to appear in the Triple-A All-Star Game.

=== Seattle Mariners ===
On August 6, 2017, the Rays traded Marjama, along with Ryan Garton, to the Seattle Mariners for Anthony Misiewicz, Luis Rengifo and a player to be named later or cash considerations. The Mariners assigned Marjama to the Tacoma Rainiers of the Triple-A Pacific Coast League after the trade.

Marjama was called up to the majors for the first time on September 1, 2017. He hit his first major league home run on October 1, 2017, against the Los Angeles Angels. He batted 3-for-9 (.333) in five games for the Mariners. Marjama competed with David Freitas for the role as backup catcher in spring training in 2018. Marjama made the Mariners' Opening Day 25-man roster for the 2018 season. Due to an injury to Mike Zunino, Marjama started on Opening Day for the Mariners. When Zunino returned from his injury on April 20, the Mariners optioned Marjama, who had batted 3-for-27 (.111), to Tacoma, while keeping Freitas as Zunino's backup.

Marjama retired from professional baseball on July 6, 2018, to pursue a career with the National Eating Disorder Association. He applied for reinstatement in 2019, but was suspended for 80 games for using a performance-enhancing drug, and served out his suspension with a team before he could be reinstated.

== Coaching career ==
=== Miami Marlins ===
Beginning in 2023, Marjama served as a hitting coach in the Miami Marlins' farm system.

On February 11, 2025, Marjama was named as the hitting coach for Miami's Triple-A affiliate, the Jacksonville Jumbo Shrimp.

=== San Francisco Giants ===
On January 23, 2026, Marjama was announced as the hitting coach for the San Jose Giants, the Single-A affiliate of the San Francisco Giants.

== Personal life ==
Marjama's father teaches science at Rocklin High School. His brother and sister were also athletes at Granite Bay High; Jake played baseball and Abby plays volleyball at the University of Alabama (c/o ‘21). Marjama serves as a substitute teacher during the offseason, working in 10 different junior high schools and high schools, including Granite Bay High.

In high school, while losing weight to compete in wrestling, Marjama developed an eating disorder through excessive exercise, causing his weight to drop to 130 pounds (59 kg). He required inpatient treatment and missed baseball in the 2006 season, his junior year. He has spoken openly about eating disorders in men to both adults and teens, and appears in a documentary about his experience on the Uninterrupted multimedia platform for athletes.
