= Eddie Gamboa =

American baseball player (born 1984)

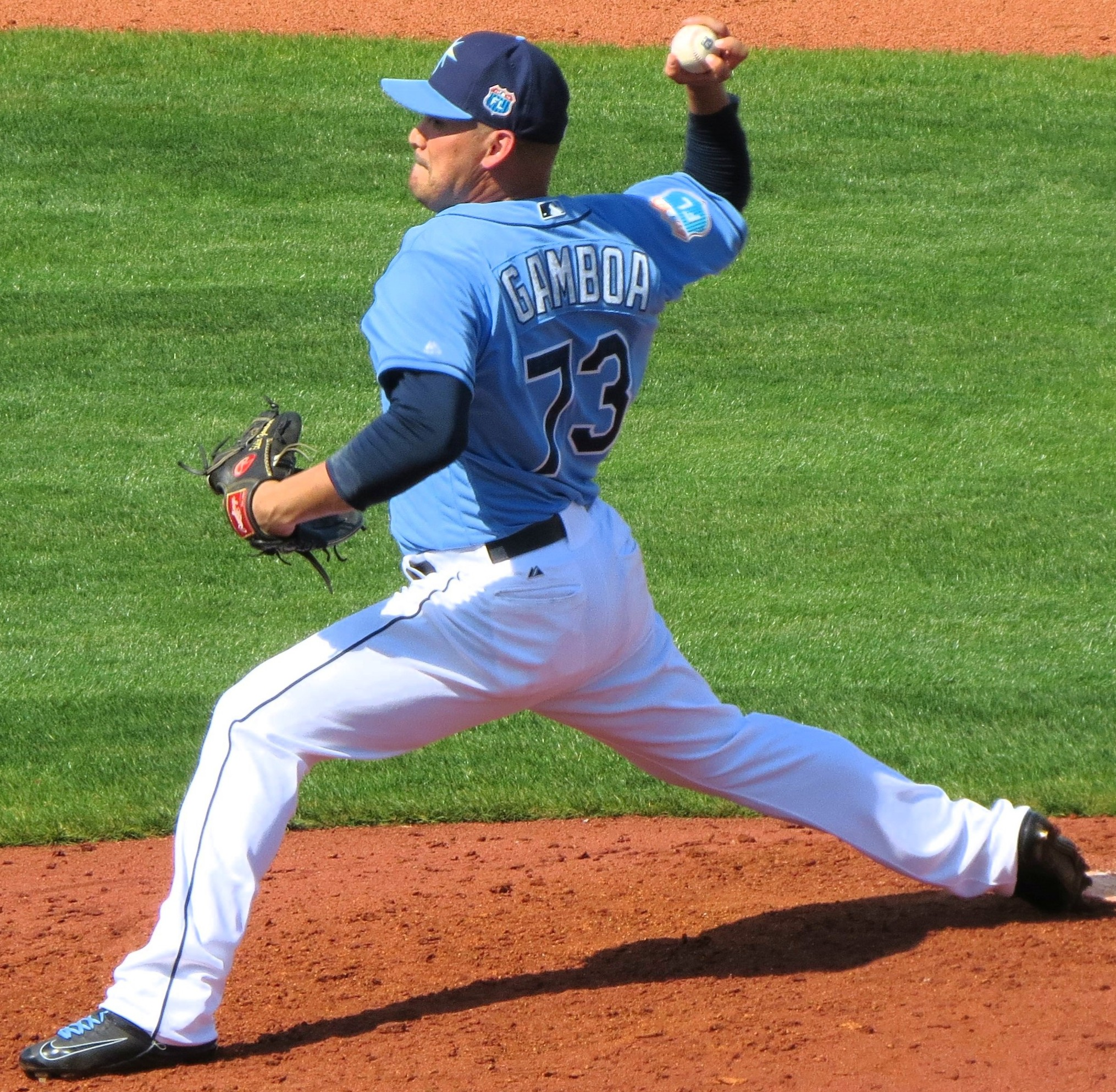
- Gamboa with the Tampa Bay Rays in 2016 Spring Training
- Pitcher
- Born: December 21, 1984 (age 41); Merced, California, U.S.
- Batted: Right Threw: Right

MLB debut
- September 2, 2016, for the Tampa Bay Rays

Last MLB appearance
- October 2, 2016, for the Tampa Bay Rays

MLB statistics
- Win–loss record: 0–2
- Earned run average: 1.35
- Strikeouts: 11
- Stats at Baseball Reference

Teams
- Tampa Bay Rays (2016)

Eduardo Avila Gamboa (born December 21, 1984) is an American former professional baseball pitcher. He played in Major League Baseball (MLB) for the Tampa Bay Rays. He is a knuckleball pitcher.

== Career ==
Gamboa attended the University of California, Davis.

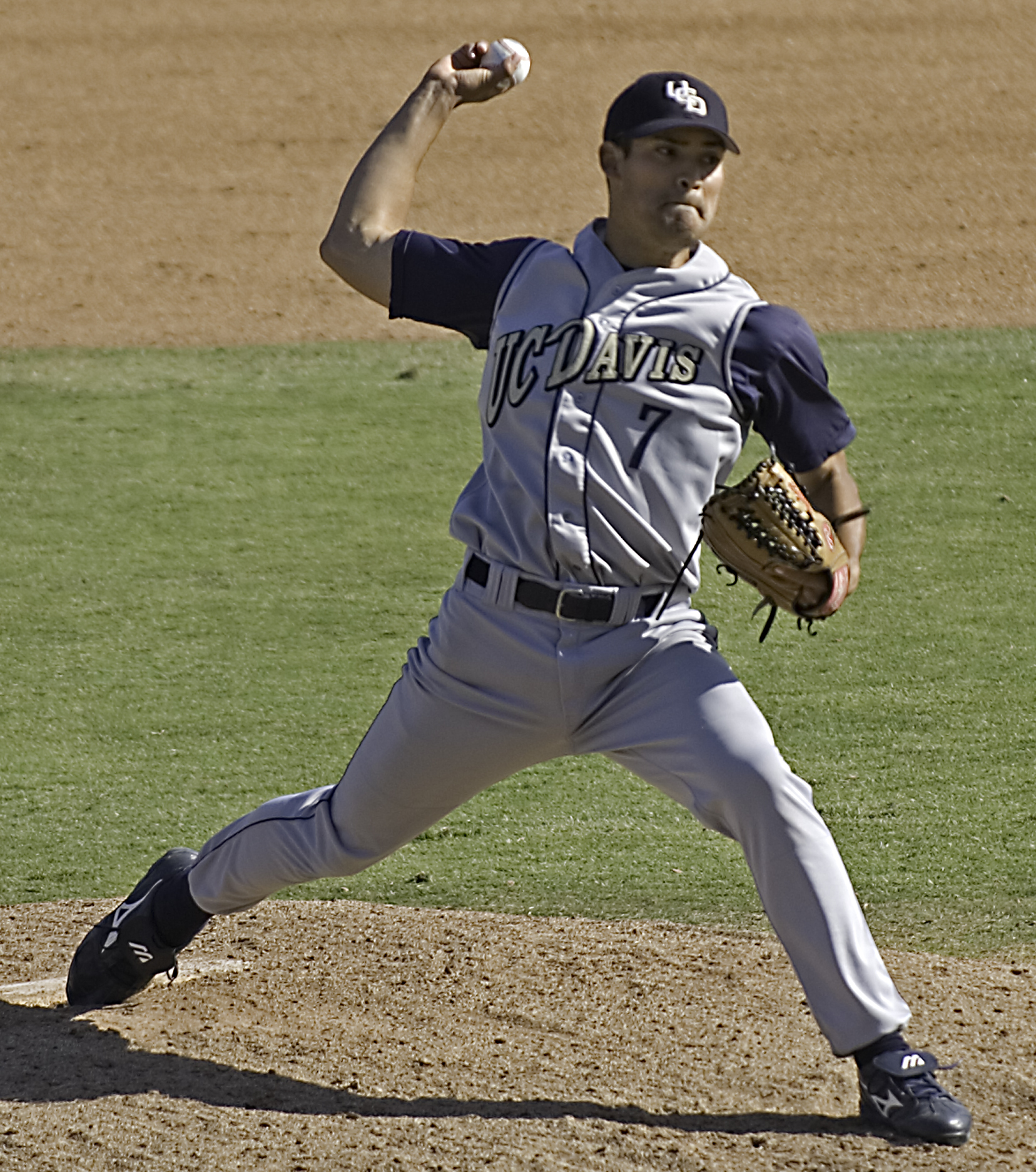
Gamboa with UC Davis in 2007.

=== Baltimore Orioles ===
The Baltimore Orioles selected Gamboa in the 21st round of the 2008 MLB draft. He made his professional debut with the rookie ball Bluefield Orioles. Gamboa split the 2009 season between three affiliates, the Single-A Delmarva Shorebirds, the High-A Frederick Keys, and the Double-A Bowie Baysox, accumulating an excellent 11-0 record and 1.08 ERA with 75 strikeouts in 39 games between the three clubs. He spent the 2010 season in Bowie, pitching to a 7-5 record and 3.75 ERA in 98.1 innings pitched. He spent the bulk of the 2011 season in Bowie as well, appearing in 2 games for Aberdeen, recording a 2-6 record and 2.90 ERA between the two teams. Gamboa reached Triple-A for the first time in 2012 with the Norfolk Tides, also playing in Bowie and Frederick, accumulating a 10-5 record and 3.61 ERA with 86 strikeouts in 29 games. He split the 2013 season between Norfolk and Bowie, registering a 6-11 record and 4.43 ERA in 25 appearances.

The Orioles added Gamboa to their 40-man roster on November 20, 2013. but non-tendered him on December 2, making him a free agent. On January 7, 2014, Gamboa re-signed with the Orioles organization on a minor league contract. Gamboa was handed a 50-game suspension for testing positive for "exogenous testosterone," a performance-enhancing substance in violation of the Minor League Drug Prevention and Treatment Program on June 13, 2014. He became a free agent after the 2014 season. On December 3, 2014, Gamboa signed a major league contract with the Orioles and was added to the 40-man roster.

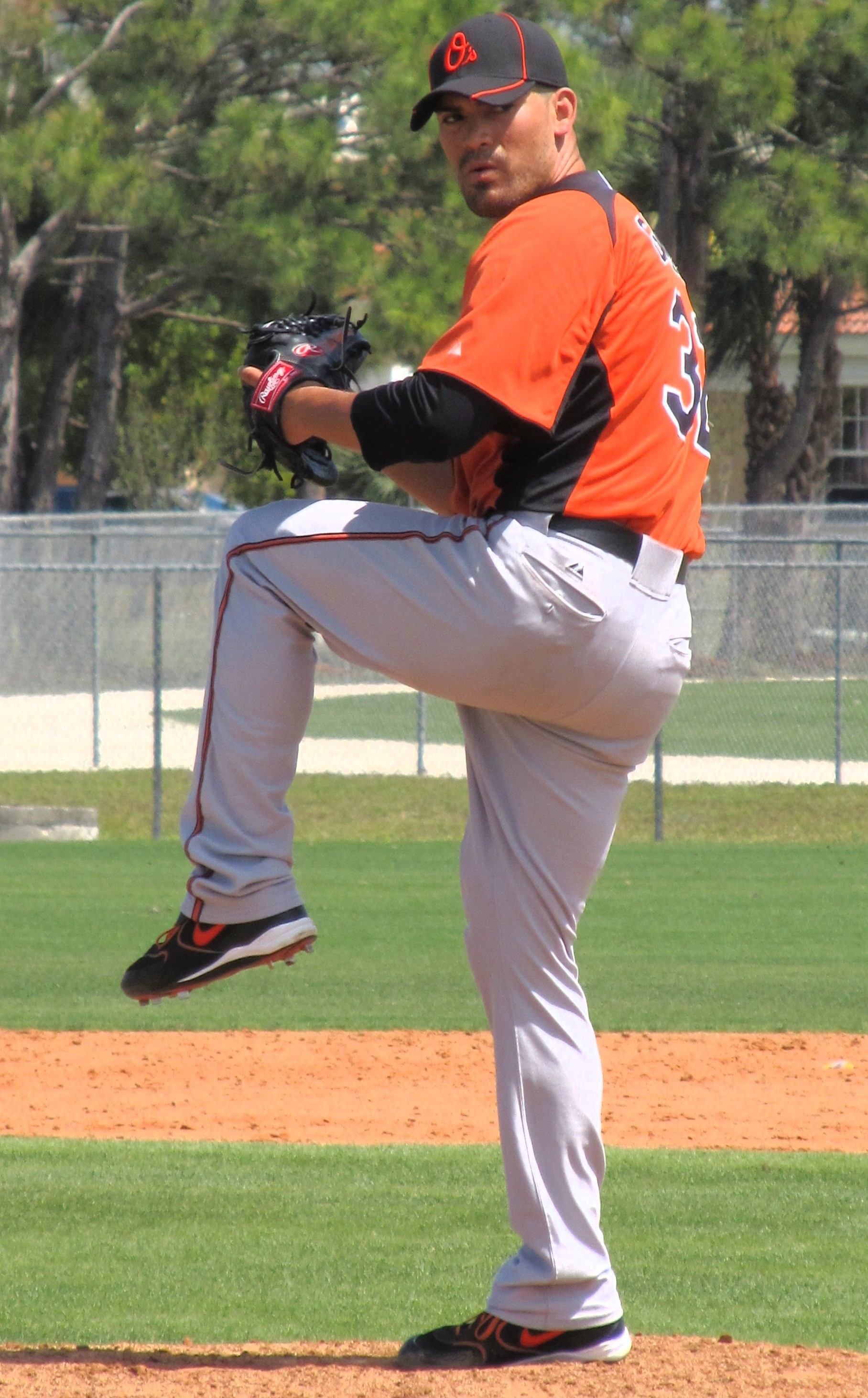
Gamboa in 2012.

Gamboa was promoted to the Orioles when Wesley Wright was placed on the disabled list on April 11, 2015. Assigned uniform number 68, he was optioned back to the Norfolk Tides without appearing in any Orioles games two days later on April 13, 2015 when David Lough was reinstated from the disabled list. On August 25, 2015, Gamboa was outrighted off of the 40-man roster. He elected free agency on November 6, 2015.

=== Tampa Bay Rays ===
Gamboa signed a minor league deal with the Tampa Bay Rays in January 2016. They promoted him to the major leagues on September 1. He made his major league debut against the Toronto Blue Jays on September 2. He was designated for assignment on February 14, 2017.

=== Texas Rangers ===
On February 14, 2017, the same day as being designated for assignment from the Rays, Gamboa was traded to the Texas Rangers for a player to be named later or cash considerations. On June 22, 2017, Gamboa was designated for assignment by the Rangers. He was assigned outright to the Round Rock Express but rejected the outright assignment and elected free agency.

=== Los Angeles Dodgers ===
On June 30, 2017, Gamboa signed a minor league deal with the Los Angeles Dodgers. He made six starts for the Triple-A Oklahoma City Dodgers and three starts (and one relief appearance) for the Double-A Tulsa Drillers. On November 6, 2017, Gamboa elected free agency.

=== Baltimore Orioles (second stint) ===
On January 19, 2018, Gamboa signed a minor league deal with the Baltimore Orioles. He split the season between the Double–A Bowie Baysox and Triple–A Norfolk Tides, accumulating a 2.88 ERA with 16 strikeouts and 2 saves across 25 innings pitched. Gamboa elected free agency following the season on November 2.

=== Sultanes de Monterrey ===
On March 21, 2019, Gamboa signed with the Sultanes de Monterrey of the Mexican League. Gamboa recorded a 4.38 ERA in 9 games in his first season for Monterrey. Gamboa did not play in a game in 2020 due to the cancellation of the LMB season because of the COVID-19 pandemic. Gamboa struggled to an 0-3 record and 7.20 ERA in 4 starts the following season and was released on July 20, 2021. However, he later re-signed with the team on July 30, 2021.

=== Mariachis de Guadalajara ===
On June 15, 2022, Gamboa was loaned to the Mariachis de Guadalajara of the Mexican League. He made only two appearances for the club, allowing two runs on four hits with one strikeout in two innings pitched. Gamboa did not appear for Guadalajara in 2023, and became a free agent following the season.
