= Matt Andriese =

American baseball player (born 1989)

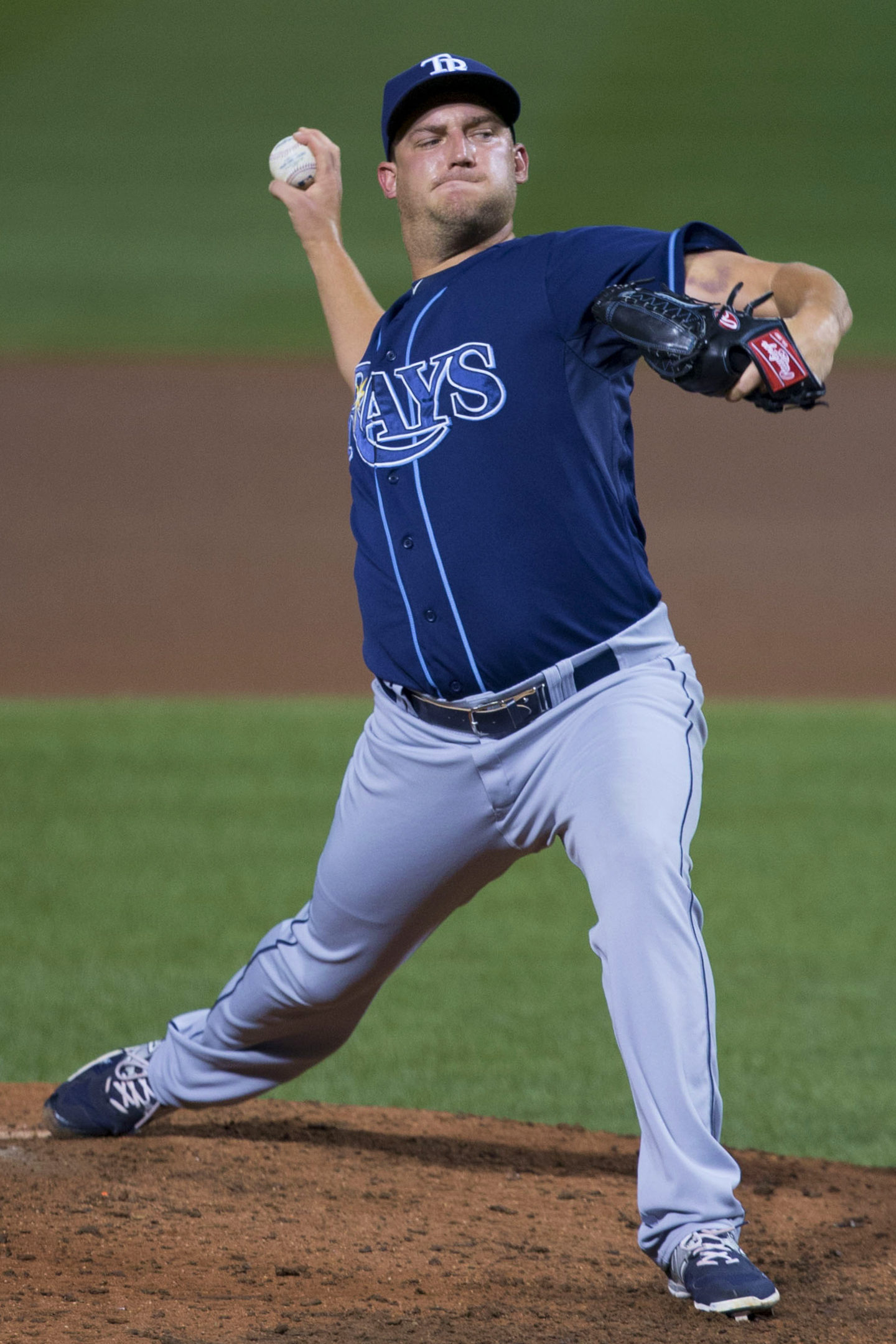
- Andriese with the Tampa Bay Rays in 2015
- Pitcher
- Born: August 28, 1989 (age 37); Redlands, California, U.S.
- Batted: Right Threw: Right

Professional debut
- MLB: April 10, 2015, for the Tampa Bay Rays
- NPB: June 7, 2022, for the Yomiuri Giants

Last appearance
- NPB: July 16, 2022, for the Yomiuri Giants
- MLB: July 4, 2024, for the Miami Marlins

MLB statistics
- Win–loss record: 28–38
- Earned run average: 4.65
- Strikeouts: 481

NPB statistics
- Win–loss record: 0–2
- Earned run average: 4.82
- Strikeouts: 18
- Stats at Baseball Reference

Teams
- Tampa Bay Rays (2015–2018); Arizona Diamondbacks (2018–2019); Los Angeles Angels (2020); Boston Red Sox (2021); Seattle Mariners (2021); Yomiuri Giants (2022); Miami Marlins (2024)

Matthew Lee Andriese (/ænˈdriːs/ an-DREESS; born August 28, 1989) is an American former professional baseball pitcher. He played in Major League Baseball (MLB) for the Tampa Bay Rays, Arizona Diamondbacks, Los Angeles Angels, Boston Red Sox, Seattle Mariners, and Miami Marlins. He has also played in Nippon Professional Baseball (NPB) for the Yomiuri Giants.

== Career ==
=== Amateur career ===
Andriese attended Redlands East Valley High School, where he played for the school's baseball team along with Tyler Chatwood. He was selected by the Texas Rangers in the 37th round of the 2008 MLB draft, but did not sign with Texas. He enrolled at the University of California, Riverside, to play college baseball for the UC Riverside Highlanders baseball team. In 2010, he played collegiate summer baseball with the Cotuit Kettleers of the Cape Cod Baseball League.

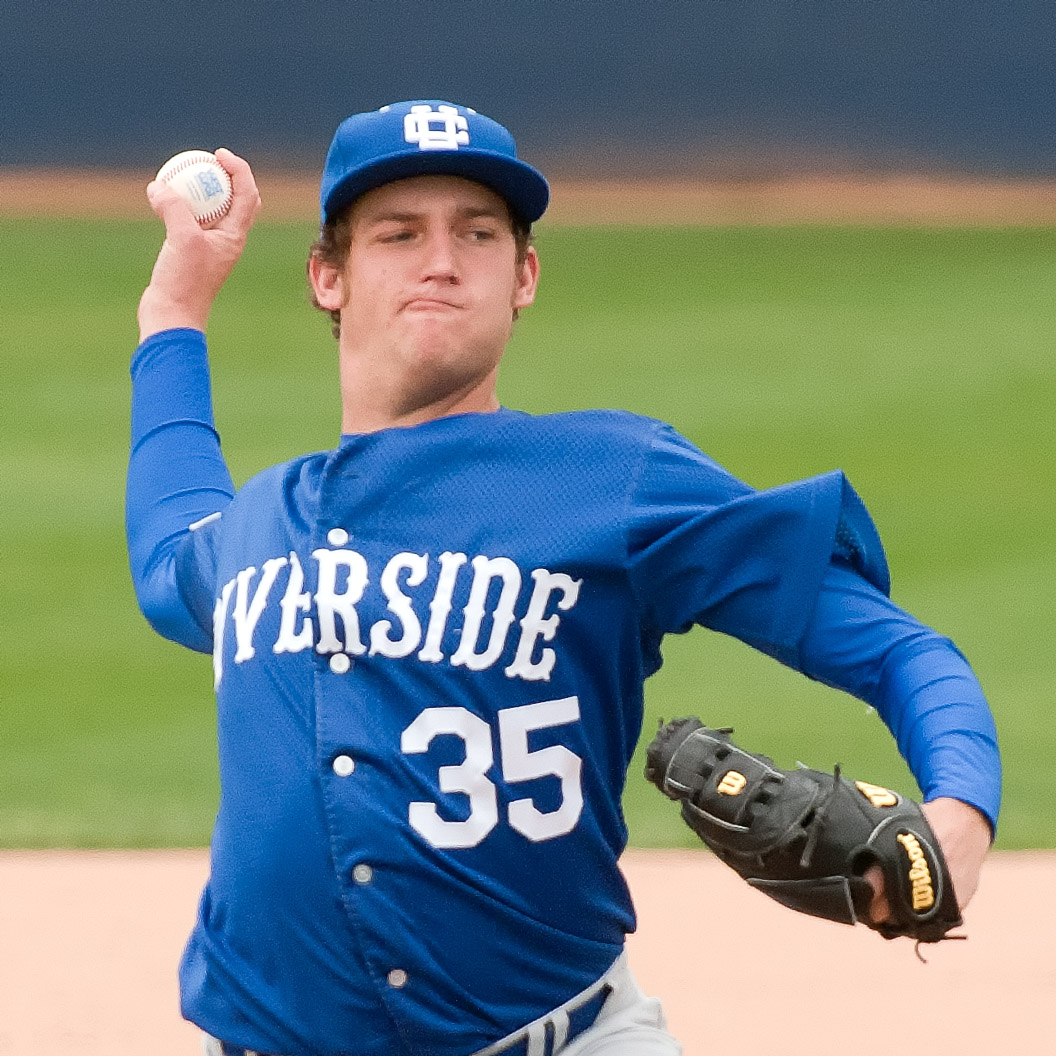
Andriese with the Highlanders in 2011

=== San Diego Padres ===
The San Diego Padres selected Andriese in the third round of the 2011 MLB draft. He signed with the Padres, and pitched for the Lake Elsinore Storm of the High–A California League in 2012. He had a strong performance with the San Antonio Missions of the Double-A Texas League in 2013, and was promoted to the Tucson Padres of the Triple-A Pacific Coast League during the season.

=== Tampa Bay Rays ===
On January 22, 2014, the Padres traded Andriese, Logan Forsythe, Brad Boxberger, Matt Lollis, and Maxx Tissenbaum to the Tampa Bay Rays in exchange for Alex Torres and Jesse Hahn. Andriese pitched for the Durham Bulls of the Triple-A International League during the 2014 season.

Andriese made the Rays' Opening Day roster out of spring training in 2015. He made his major league debut on April 10, and made his first start on April 14. He finished the 2015 season with 25 appearances (eight starts) and a 4.11 earned run average (ERA). On May 14, 2016, Andriese threw his first career complete game shutout, allowing just two hits in a 6–0 victory over the Oakland Athletics. In the 2016 season, Andriese again spent time in both the rotation and the bullpen, appearing in 29 games (19 starts); he went 8–8 with a 4.37 ERA and 109 strikeouts in 127 2/3 innings pitched.

At the start of the 2017 season, Andriese was the fifth pitcher in the Rays rotation, he started the season going 5–1 with a 3.54 ERA in 12 starts before falling victim to a stress reaction in his hip in mid-June. He was moved to the 60-day disabled list, and did not return until late August. Overall for the 2017 season, he made 18 appearances (17 starts) with a 5–5 record and 4.50 ERA. Andriese began the 2018 season with Tampa Bay, pitching to a 3–4 record and 4.07 ERA in 27 games (four starts).

=== Arizona Diamondbacks ===
On July 25, 2018, the Rays traded Andriese to the Arizona Diamondbacks in exchange for minor-league catcher Michael Pérez and minor-league pitcher Brian Shaffer. Through the end of the 2018 season, Andriese made 14 appearances (one start) with the Diamondbacks, going 0–3 with an ERA of 9.00. He returned to Arizona for the 2019 season, making 54 appearances (all in relief) while accruing a 4.71 ERA and a 5–5 record.

=== Los Angeles Angels ===
On January 14, 2020, Andriese was traded to the Los Angeles Angels in exchange for Jeremy Beasley. On July 26, 2020, Andriese made his Angels debut against the Oakland Athletics, in relief of Shohei Ohtani—he pitched 5 2/3 innings, striking out five batters and allowing no runs. Overall during the 2020 season, Andriese appeared in 16 games (1 start) with the Angels, compiling a 2–4 record with a 4.50 ERA and two saves. On December 2, Andriese was nontendered by the Angels.

=== Boston Red Sox ===
On December 23, 2020, Andriese signed a one-year, $1.85 million deal with the Boston Red Sox. In 26 appearances for Boston, Andriese struggled to a 6.03 ERA with 38 strikeouts; he was designated for assignment on August 17, 2021. On August 19, Andriese was released by the Red Sox.

=== Seattle Mariners ===
On August 22, 2021, Andriese signed a major-league contract with the Seattle Mariners. Andriese made 8 appearances for the Mariners, recording a 2.45 ERA with 12 strikeouts. After being designated for assignment on September 28, Andriese elected free agency on September 30.

=== Yomiuri Giants ===
On December 17, 2021, Andriese signed with the Yomiuri Giants of Nippon Professional Baseball. He became a free agent following the 2022 season.

=== Los Angeles Dodgers ===
On February 1, 2023, Andreise signed a minor league contract with the Los Angeles Dodgers. He made 21 appearances (19 starts) for the Triple-A Oklahoma City Dodgers, posting an 8–6 record and 6.05 ERA with 78 strikeouts across 93 2/3 innings pitched, Andriese elected free agency following the season on November 6.

=== Miami Marlins ===
On November 29, 2023, Andriese signed a minor league contract with the Miami Marlins. On April 4, 2024, he had his contract selected to the major league roster. In 3 appearances for Miami, Andriese allowed three runs in five innings pitched. He was designated for assignment by the Marlins on April 13. On April 15, Andriese cleared waivers and was sent outright to the Triple–A Jacksonville Jumbo Shrimp. On July 4, his contract was purchased back to the active roster. He made one appearance for Miami before he was designated for assignment again on July 7. Andriese returned to Jacksonville via outright assignment on July 9. He elected free agency on October 2.

== International career ==
On October 29, 2018, Andriese was selected to the MLB All-Stars for the 2018 MLB Japan All-Star Series.
