= Tyler Sturdevant =

American baseball player

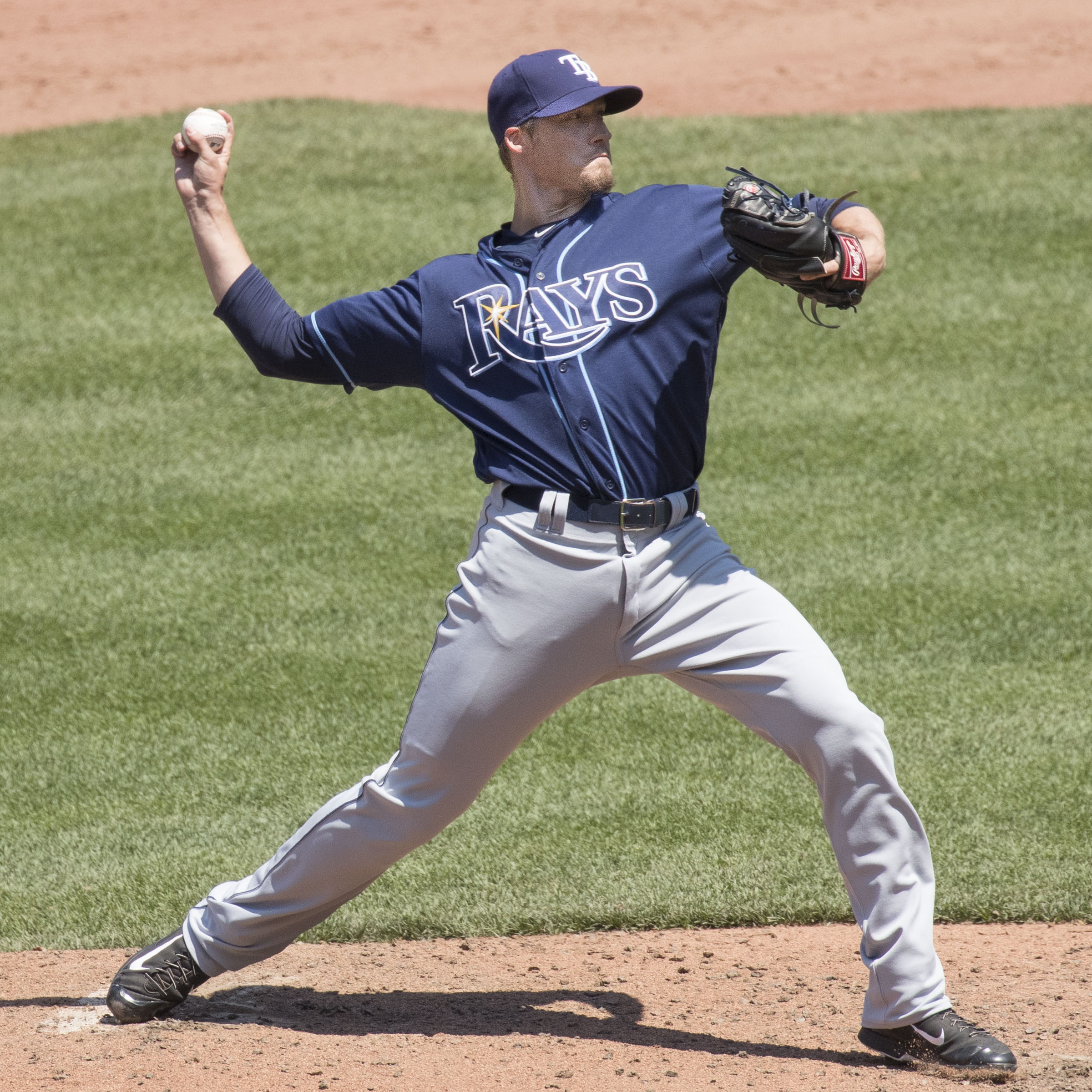
- Sturdevant with the Tampa Bay Rays
- Pitcher
- Born: December 20, 1985 (age 40); Littleton, Colorado, U.S.
- Batted: Right Threw: Right

MLB debut
- May 24, 2016, for the Tampa Bay Rays

Last MLB appearance
- August 25, 2016, for the Tampa Bay Rays

MLB statistics
- Win–loss record: 0–1
- Earned run average: 3.93
- Strikeouts: 14
- Stats at Baseball Reference

Teams
- Tampa Bay Rays (2016)

Tyler James Sturdevant (born December 20, 1985) is an American former professional baseball pitcher. He played in Major League Baseball (MLB) for the Tampa Bay Rays.

== Career ==
=== Cleveland Indians ===
Sturdevant attended Chatfield Senior High School, in Littleton, Colorado, graduating in 2004. He played college baseball at New Mexico State University. He was drafted by the Cleveland Indians in the 27th round of the 2009 Major League Baseball draft.

=== Tampa Bay Rays ===
On November 20, 2015, Sturdevant signed a minor league contract with the Tampa Bay Rays organization. On May 22, 2016, Sturdevant was selected to the 40-man roster and promoted to the major leagues for the first time. In 16 appearances for the Rays during his rookie campaign, he compiled a 3.93 ERA with 14 strikeouts across 18 1/3 innings pitched. On September 11, Sturdevant was designated for assignment by Tampa Bay. He cleared waivers and was sent outright to Durham the next day. Sturdevant elected free agency following the season on November 7.

=== Oakland Athletics ===
On November 16, 2016, Sturdevant signed a minor league contract with the Oakland Athletics organization. In 43 appearances split between the Double–A Midland RockHounds and Triple–A Nashville Sounds, he registered a cumulative 4.03 ERA with 44 strikeouts and 4 saves in 60 1/3 innings pitched. Sturdevant elected free agency following the season on November 6, 2017.
