= Juniel Querecuto =

Venezuelan baseball player (born 1992)

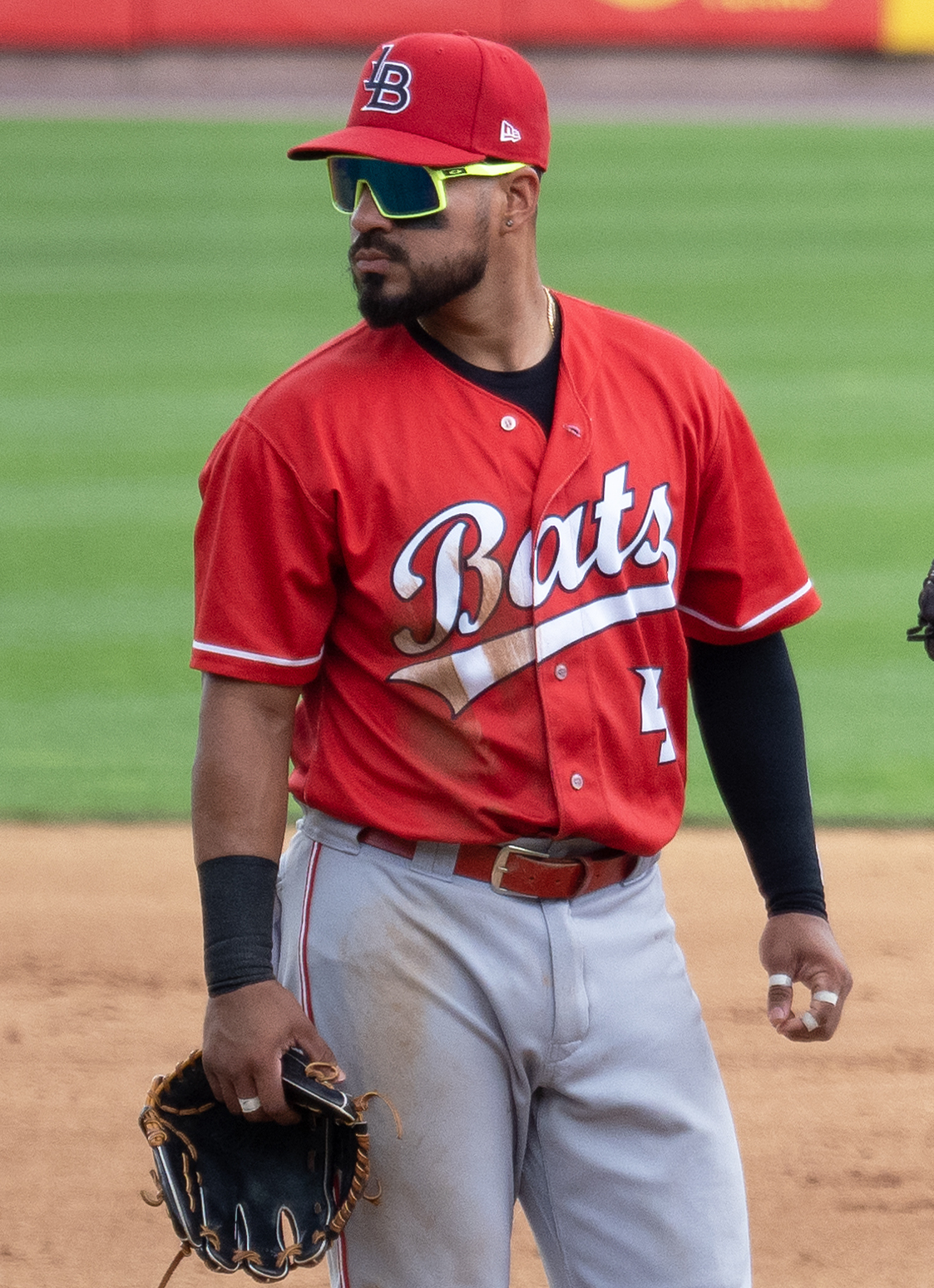
- Querecuto with the Louisville Bats in 2022

Guerreros de Oaxaca – No. 5
- Infielder
- Born: September 19, 1992 (age 33); Barquisimeto, Venezuela
- Bats: Switch Throws: Right

MLB debut
- September 22, 2016, for the Tampa Bay Rays

MLB statistics (through 2023 season)
- Batting average: .097
- Home runs: 0
- Runs batted in: 2
- Stats at Baseball Reference

Teams
- Tampa Bay Rays (2016); St. Louis Cardinals (2023)

Juniel Alberto Querecuto (born September 19, 1992) is a Venezuelan professional baseball infielder for the Guerreros de Oaxaca of the Mexican League. He has previously played in Major League Baseball (MLB) for the Tampa Bay Rays and St. Louis Cardinals.

== Professional career ==
=== Tampa Bay Rays ===
Querecuto signed with the Tampa Bay Rays organization as an international free agent on July 2, 2009. In 2010, he made his professional baseball debut with the Gulf Coast League Rays. In 46 games, Querecuto batted .251 and recorded 11 runs batted in (RBI). In 2011, he was assigned to the Low-A Hudson Valley Renegades, and hit .241 with 24 RBI in 70 games. Querecuto continued to advance through the Rays minor league system, spending the entire 2012 season with the Single-A Bowling Green Hot Rods. He played in 106 games, batting .249 with 32 RBI.

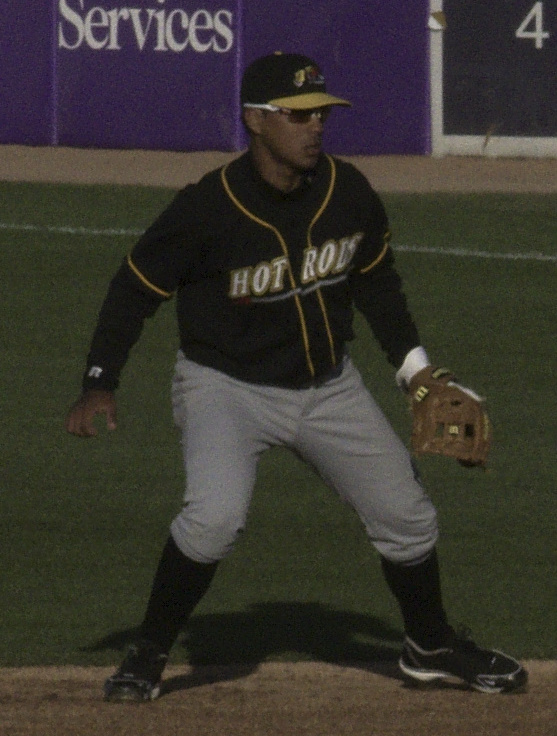
Querecuto with the Bowling Green Hot Rods in 2012

Querecuto did not play at any level in 2013. In 2014, he was assigned to Bowling Green to open the season, and earned a promotion to the High-A Charlotte Stone Crabs of the Florida State League in July. Appearing in a career-high 115 games, Querecuto hit .271 with two home runs and 45 RBI. In the offseason, he played for the Cardenales de Lara of the Venezuelan Winter League. He began the 2015 season with Charlotte, but later was promoted to the Double-A Montgomery Biscuits and Triple-A Durham Bulls. Querecuto recorded a .256 batting average with two home runs and 34 RBI in 89 games spread across all three levels. He played in 53 games for the Cardenales in the offseason, hitting .352 and 19 RBI. In 96 games with Montgomery and Durham in 2016, Querecuto batted .241 with three home runs and 38 RBI.

Querecuto was called up to the major leagues for the first time on September 21, 2016. He made his major league debut the next day. Querecuto appeared in four games for the Rays in 2016, and went 1-for-11 at the plate with a two-run triple. On October 7, he was removed from the 40–man roster and sent outright to Triple–A Durham. Querecuto elected free agency following the season on November 7.

=== San Francisco Giants ===
On November 19, 2016, Querecuto signed a minor league contract with the San Francisco Giants organization. He spent the 2017 season with the Triple–A Sacramento River Cats, playing in 94 games and hitting .232/.299/.290 with 2 home runs and 27 RBI. Querecuto elected free agency following the season on November 6, 2017.

=== Arizona Diamondbacks ===
Querecuto signed a minor league contract with the Arizona Diamondbacks on March 23, 2018 and was assigned to the Double-A Jackson Generals. He was named a Southern League All-Star at midseason. In 115 games split between Jackson and the Triple-A Reno Aces, Querecuto slashed .337/.381/.418 with one home run, 45 RBI, and 18 stolen bases. He returned to Reno in 2019, playing in 102 games and hitting .288/.317/.438 with career-highs in home runs (9) and RBI (51).

Querecuto did not play in a game in 2020 due to the cancellation of the minor league season because of the COVID-19 pandemic. He re-signed with the Diamondbacks on a minor league contract on November 2, 2020. Querecuto spent the 2021 season with the Triple-A Reno. He played in 96 games, hitting .301 with 13 home runs and 79 RBI. He elected free agency following the season on November 7, 2021.

=== Cincinnati Reds ===
On January 11, 2022, Querecuto signed a minor league contract with the Cincinnati Reds that included an invitation to spring training. He played in 108 games for the Triple-A Louisville Bats, slashing .256/.308/.417 with 11 home runs, 34 RBI, and 10 stolen bases. Querecuto elected free agency following the season on November 10.

=== St. Louis Cardinals ===
On November 18, 2022, Querecuto signed a minor league contract with the St. Louis Cardinals organization. He played in 106 games for the Triple–A Memphis Redbirds, hitting .269/.343/.418 with 13 home runs, 57 RBI, and 12 stolen bases. On September 13, 2023, the Cardinals selected Querecuto's contract, adding him to the major league roster. In 9 games for St. Louis, he went 2–for–20 (.100) with one walk. Following the season on October 26, Querecuto was removed from the 40–man roster and sent outright to Triple–A Memphis. He elected free agency on October 29.

=== Saraperos de Saltillo ===
On February 14, 2024, Querecuto signed with the Saraperos de Saltillo of the Mexican League. In 10 games for the Saraperos, he went 6–for–32 (.188) with no home runs and three RBI. Querecuto was released by Saltillo on May 1.

=== Guerreros de Oaxaca ===
On May 5, 2024, Querecuto signed with the Guerreros de Oaxaca of the Mexican League. In 41 appearances for Oaxaca, he slashed .283/.332/.464 with six home runs, 32 RBI, and four stolen bases. Querecuto became a free agent following the season.

On July 28, 2025, Querecuto re-signed with the Guerreros. In 8 games he hit .364/.432/.485 with 1 home run, 4 RBIs and 1 stolen base.

== Personal life ==
His father, Juan Querecuto, played 13 seasons with the Cardenales de Lara.

== See also ==
- List of Major League Baseball players from Venezuela
