= Enny Romero =

Dominican baseball player (born 1991)

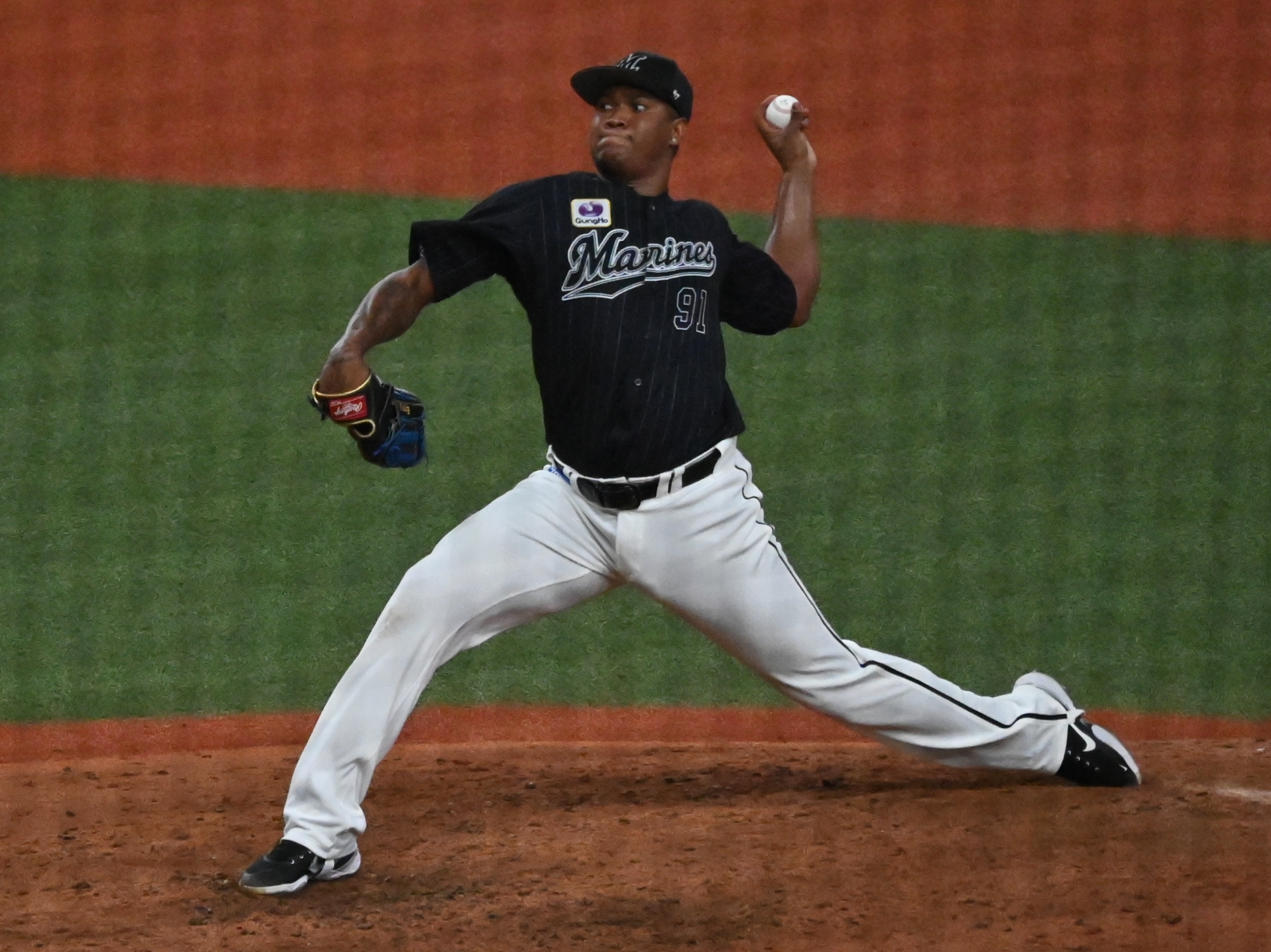
- Romero with the Chiba Lotte Marines

Toros de Tijuana – No. 16
- Pitcher
- Born: January 24, 1991 (age 35); Santo Domingo, Dominican Republic
- Bats: Left Throws: Left

Professional debut
- MLB: September 22, 2013, for the Tampa Bay Rays
- NPB: April 4, 2019, for the Chunichi Dragons

MLB statistics (through 2018 season)
- Win–loss record: 4–6
- Earned run average: 5.12
- Strikeouts: 156

NPB statistics (through 2022 season)
- Win–loss record: 17–19
- Earned run average: 3.60
- Strikeouts: 202
- Stats at Baseball Reference

Teams
- Tampa Bay Rays (2013, 2015–2016); Washington Nationals (2017–2018); Pittsburgh Pirates (2018); Kansas City Royals (2018); Chunichi Dragons (2019–2020); Chiba Lotte Marines (2021–2022)

Enny Manuel Romero Hernandez (born January 24, 1991) is a Dominican professional baseball pitcher for the Toros de Tijuana of the Mexican League. He has previously played in Major League Baseball (MLB) for the Tampa Bay Rays, Washington Nationals, Pittsburgh Pirates, and Kansas City Royals, and in Nippon Professional Baseball (NPB) for the Chunichi Dragons.

== Professional career ==
=== Tampa Bay Rays ===
Romero represented the Rays at the 2012 All-Star Futures Game. He was added to the Rays' 40-man roster on November 20, 2012. Romero was called up to start against the Baltimore Orioles on September 22, 2013. After spending the entirety of the 2014 season in the minor leagues, Romero returned to major league action in the 2015 season as a reliever, pitching 30 innings for the Rays on the year. Starting the 2016 season, Romero retired 17 consecutive batters across relief appearances to set a franchise record for the Rays. Romero notched his first career save on August 25, 2016, striking out slugger David Ortiz to seal a Rays victory over the division rival Boston Red Sox. In total, Romero pitched to a 5.27 ERA over 80 1/3 innings with the Rays across three seasons, exhibiting a high walk rate of about five batters per nine innings.

=== Washington Nationals ===
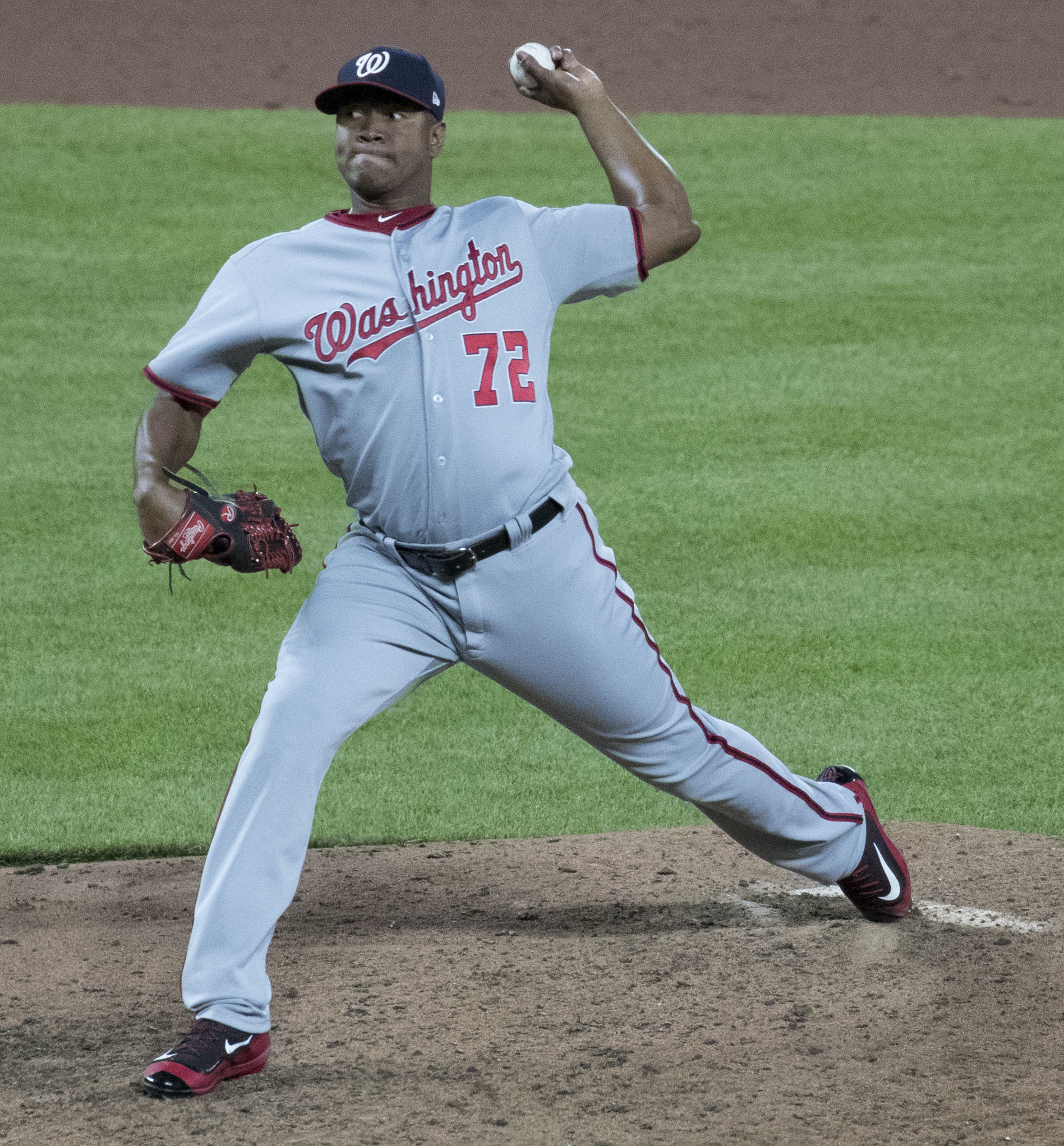
Romero with the Washington Nationals

The Rays traded Romero to the Washington Nationals for minor league pitcher Jeffrey Rosa on February 7, 2017.

Romero pitched for the Dominican Republic national baseball team in the 2017 World Baseball Classic, earning the win in a March 12 game against Colombia with a scoreless inning of relief. He joined the Nationals at spring training after the initial round of the WBC.

With the Nationals, Romero quickly became a key cog in manager Dusty Baker's bullpen as it struggled to find its footing over the first half of the season, going through three closers before Baker decided to handle the ninth inning by committee. While Romero continued to walk batters at an above-average rate, as he had with Tampa Bay, his strikeout rate climbed and his earned run average declined relative to what it had been with the Rays. He was frequently deployed to handle the eighth and even the ninth inning.

Romero began the 2018 season on the Nationals′ roster, but in two appearances posted a 13.50 ERA in two innings of work. The Nationals designated him for assignment on April 7, 2018.

=== Pittsburgh Pirates ===
On April 14, 2018, the Pittsburgh Pirates claimed Romero off waivers. He appeared in two games for the Pirates, hitting a double in his first at-bat, but in the four innings he pitched he gave up five runs, three of them unearned, on seven hits, giving him an ERA with Pittsburgh of 7.50. In order to make room on their roster for the major-league debut of pitching prospect Nick Kingham, the Pirates initially decided to designate Romero for assignment on April 29, but within hours changed their minds after Romero and his agent informed them that Romero had injured his shoulder while pitching on April 25. The Pirates instead opted to place him on the 10-day disabled list. He was designated for assignment on July 2.

=== Kansas City Royals ===
The Kansas City Royals claimed Romero off waivers on July 5, 2018. On July 21, 2018, he was designated for assignment. On July 26, 2018, Romero elected to become a free agent.

=== Chunichi Dragons ===
On December 3, 2018, it was announced that Romero had signed with the Chunichi Dragons in the NPB's Central League.

On April 4, 2019, Romero made his NPB debut. After the season, he re-signed with Dragons.

On December 2, 2020, he became a free agent.

=== Los Angeles Dodgers ===
On January 14, 2021, Romero signed a minor league contract with the Los Angeles Dodgers organization that included an invitation to major league Spring Training. He was released on April 4, 2021.

=== Chiba Lotte Marines ===
On August 10, 2021, Romero signed with the Chiba Lotte Marines of Nippon Professional Baseball. He made 4 appearances for the team down the stretch, recording a 1.54 ERA with 20 strikeouts.

Romero made 20 appearances for Lotte during the 2022 season, compiling an 8–9 record and 3.36 ERA with 77 strikeouts across 115 1/3 innings pitched. He became a free agent following the season.

=== SSG Landers ===
On December 12, 2022, Romero signed with the SSG Landers of the KBO League. He began the 2023 season on the injured list with a shoulder injury, and did not appear in a game for the team. On May 3, 2023, Romero was released by the Landers following the signing of Roenis Elías.

=== San Francisco Giants ===
On December 21, 2024, Romero signed a minor league contract with the San Francisco Giants. He did not make an appearance for the organization before he was released on May 9, 2025.

=== Toros de Tijuana ===
On August 3, 2026, Romero signed with the Toros de Tijuana of the Mexican League.

== Pitching style ==
Romero's main weapon is a blazing fastball, which he threw in the high 90s while in the Tampa Bay Rays organization but which began routinely hitting the century mark in 2017, beginning at the World Baseball Classic. In a July 2017 game with the Washington Nationals, Romero hit 102 miles per hour (164 km/h) with his fastball in a strikeout of Atlanta Braves star Freddie Freeman. Romero also mixes in a cutter that rides in at about 90 miles per hour (140 km/h), as well as an occasional curveball.

Perhaps the most notable drawback in Romero's game throughout his professional career has been a lack of command, with a high walk rate coloring his time in Tampa Bay. During 2017 spring training with the Nationals, a MASN Sports beat reporter noted that he appeared to have made adjustments allowing him to better locate his pitches, and Romero exhibited improved command into the 2017 season.
