= Ryan Garton =

American baseball player (born 1989)

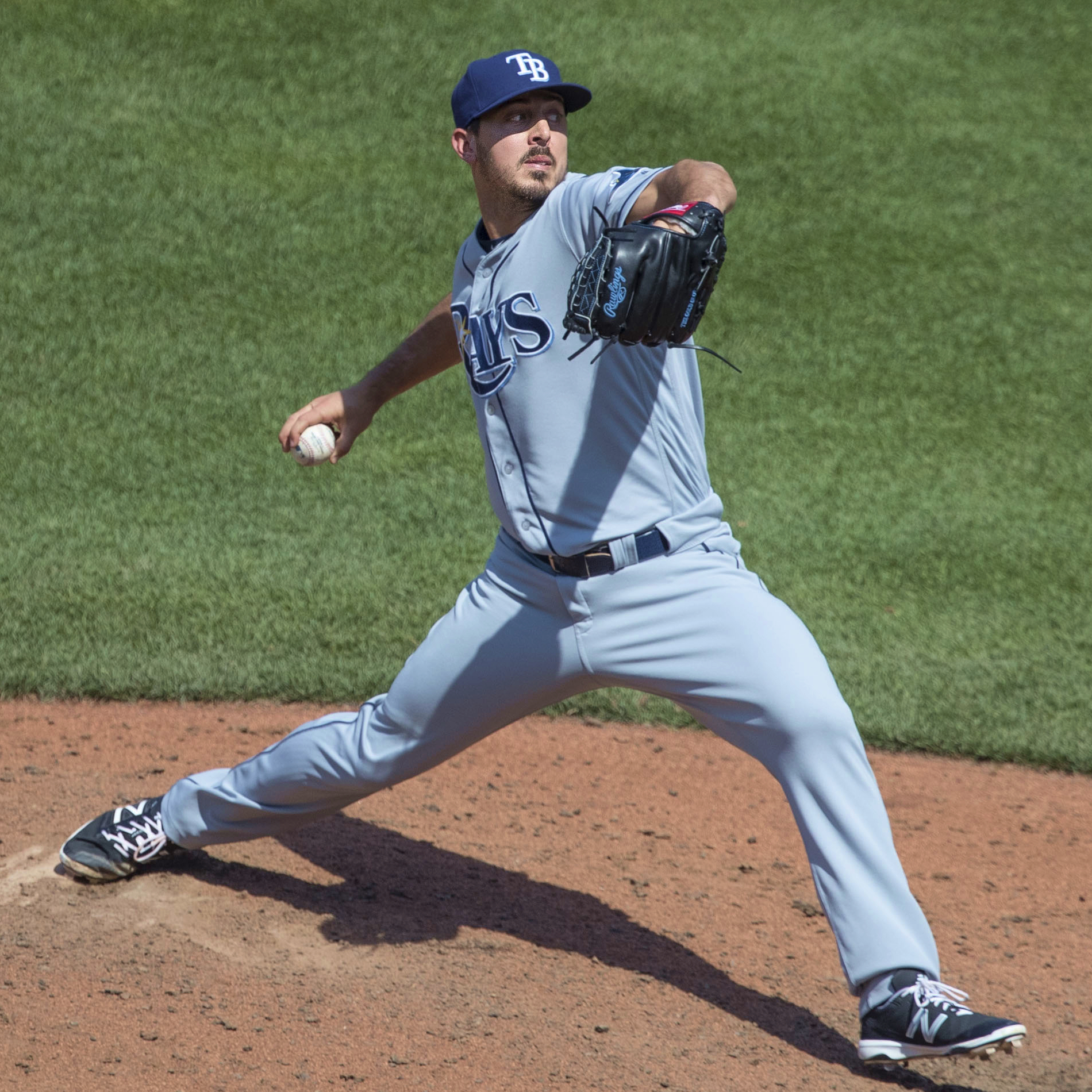
- Garton with the Tampa Bay Rays
- Pitcher
- Born: December 5, 1989 (age 36); Clearwater, Florida, U.S.
- Batted: Right Threw: Right

MLB debut
- May 26, 2016, for the Tampa Bay Rays

Last MLB appearance
- May 20, 2019, for the Seattle Mariners

MLB statistics
- Win–loss record: 1–3
- Earned run average: 4.90
- Strikeouts: 50
- Stats at Baseball Reference

Teams
- Tampa Bay Rays (2016–2017); Seattle Mariners (2017, 2019)

Ryan Patrick Garton (born December 5, 1989) is an American former professional baseball pitcher. He played in Major League Baseball (MLB) for the Tampa Bay Rays in 2016 and 2017 and the Seattle Mariners in 2017 and 2019.

== Career ==
=== Tampa Bay Rays ===
Garton attended J. W. Mitchell High School in New Port Richey, Florida, and Florida Atlantic University, where he played college baseball for the Florida Atlantic Owls. In 2011, he pitched in summer college baseball for the Bethesda Big Train. The Tampa Bay Rays selected him in the 34th round of the 2012 Major League Baseball draft.

The Rays promoted Garton to the major leagues on May 25, 2016, and he made his major league debut the next day in the seventh inning of a game against the Miami Marlins, allowing three earned runs on two innings pitched.

=== Seattle Mariners ===
On August 6, 2017, the Rays traded Garton and Mike Marjama to the Seattle Mariners for Anthony Misiewicz, Luis Rengifo, and a player to be named later or cash considerations. Garton was removed from the 40-man roster and sent outright to Triple-A on October 26. Garton spent all of 2018 with the Triple-A Tacoma Rainiers. He was assigned to Tacoma to start the 2019 season. He had his contract selected to the major leagues on May 17, 2019. He was designated for assignment on May 21. He elected free agency on October 8, 2019. In 15 games with the Mariners, he had a 3.68 ERA in 14 2/3 innings.

=== Minnesota Twins ===
On November 26, 2019, Garton signed a minor league contract with the Minnesota Twins. He did not play in a game in 2020 due to the cancellation of the minor league season because of the COVID-19 pandemic. Garton was released by the Twins organization on September 4, 2020.

=== Retirement ===
On March 5, 2021, Garton joined the coaching staff of Heisler Hitting, a baseball academy run by former minor league baseball player Adam Heisler.

=== Acereros de Monclova ===
On July 21, 2021, Garton came out of retirement and signed with the Acereros de Monclova of the Mexican League. He was released on August 5 after posting a 7.00 ERA in 8 appearances.

Garton again retired on September 20, 2021, when he joined the Southern Performance Institute as part of the coaching staff.

== Personal life ==
Garton's wife, Christina Lodato, is a strength coach for Olympic sports for the Ole Miss Rebels. She worked in similar roles at the University of South Alabama and University of Tampa. Their first child was born in October 2023.
