= 2013 Tampa Bay Rays season =

2013 Tampa Bay Rays
- American League Wild Card winners
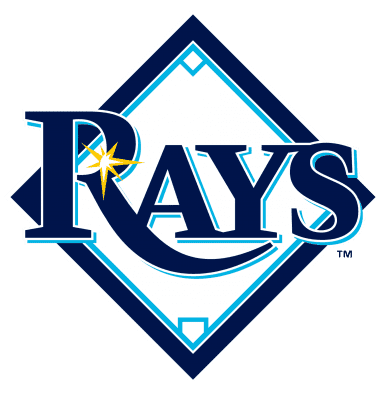
- League: American League
- Division: East
- Ballpark: Tropicana Field
- City: St. Petersburg, Florida
- Record: 92–71 (.564)
- Divisional place: 2nd
- Owners: Stuart Sternberg
- General managers: Andrew Friedman (de facto)
- Managers: Joe Maddon
- Television: Sun Sports (Dewayne Staats, Brian Anderson, Todd Kalas)
- Radio: Tampa Bay Rays Radio Network (English) (Andy Freed, Dave Wills, Todd Kalas); WGES (Spanish) (Ricardo Taveras, Enrique Oliu)

The Tampa Bay Rays' 2013 season was the Rays' 16th season of Major League Baseball and the sixth as the "Rays" (all at Tropicana Field). The Rays hoped to improve upon their 90–72 record and third-place finish from 2012. After 162 games, the Rays had a 91–71 record, but fell into a tie with the Texas Rangers for the last remaining wild card berth. The Rays won in a tie-breaker game on September 30 and then beat the Cleveland Indians in the ALWC Game on October 2. They advanced to play the Boston Red Sox in the ALDS, but lost the series in four games.

== Offseason ==
The Rays decided to pick up the options of starting pitcher James Shields, closer Fernando Rodney, and catcher José Molina, while declining the option of designated hitter Luke Scott on October 31, 2012.

Third baseman Evan Longoria was given a six-year, $100 million contract extension on November 26, 2012. This put Longoria under contract with Tampa Bay through the 2022 season, with a team option for 2023.

Pitchers James Shields and Wade Davis, along with a player to be named later (who turned out to be Elliot Johnson on February 12), were traded on the night of December 9, 2012 to the Kansas City Royals. In return, the Rays acquired four Kansas City prospects: outfielder Wil Myers, pitchers Jake Odorizzi and Mike Montgomery, and third baseman Patrick Leonard.

Reliever Kyle Farnsworth was re-signed to a one-year $3 million contract with incentives on January 24.

Infielder Reid Brignac was traded to the Colorado Rockies on February 14. The Rockies sent cash considerations and a player to be named later.

Some of the Rays' losses to free agency included center fielder B. J. Upton, who signed a five-year, $75.25 million deal with the Atlanta Braves. The Rays had previously offered Upton a one-year $13.3 million qualifying offer in order to receive draft pick compensation should Upton not re-sign. The Rays also lost infielder Jeff Keppinger when he signed a three-year, $12 million agreement with the Chicago White Sox on December 5, 2012. Reliever J. P. Howell signed with the Los Angeles Dodgers for one year and $2.85 million, plus $1.2 million in performance bonuses, on January 6.

== Season standings ==
=== American League East ===
AL East
| Team | W | L | Pct. | GB | Home | Road |
|---|---|---|---|---|---|---|
| Boston Red Sox | 97 | 65 | .599 | — | 53‍–‍28 | 44‍–‍37 |
| Tampa Bay Rays | 92 | 71 | .564 | 5½ | 51‍–‍30 | 41‍–‍41 |
| New York Yankees | 85 | 77 | .525 | 12 | 46‍–‍35 | 39‍–‍42 |
| Baltimore Orioles | 85 | 77 | .525 | 12 | 46‍–‍35 | 39‍–‍42 |
| Toronto Blue Jays | 74 | 88 | .457 | 23 | 40‍–‍41 | 34‍–‍47 |

=== American League Wild Card ===
Division winners
| Team | W | L | Pct. |
|---|---|---|---|
| Boston Red Sox | 97 | 65 | .599 |
| Oakland Athletics | 96 | 66 | .593 |
| Detroit Tigers | 93 | 69 | .574 |

Wild Card teams (Top 2 teams qualify for postseason)
| Team | W | L | Pct. | GB |
|---|---|---|---|---|
| Cleveland Indians | 92 | 70 | .568 | +½ |
| Tampa Bay Rays | 92 | 71 | .564 | — |
| Texas Rangers | 91 | 72 | .558 | 1 |
| Kansas City Royals | 86 | 76 | .531 | 5½ |
| New York Yankees | 85 | 77 | .525 | 6½ |
| Baltimore Orioles | 85 | 77 | .525 | 6½ |
| Los Angeles Angels of Anaheim | 78 | 84 | .481 | 13½ |
| Toronto Blue Jays | 74 | 88 | .457 | 17½ |
| Seattle Mariners | 71 | 91 | .438 | 20½ |
| Minnesota Twins | 66 | 96 | .407 | 25½ |
| Chicago White Sox | 63 | 99 | .389 | 28½ |
| Houston Astros | 51 | 111 | .315 | 40½ |

=== Record vs. opponents ===
2013 American League record Source: MLB Standings Grid – 2013
| Team | BAL | BOS | CWS | CLE | DET | HOU | KC | LAA | MIN | NYY | OAK | SEA | TB | TEX | TOR | NL |
|---|---|---|---|---|---|---|---|---|---|---|---|---|---|---|---|---|
| Baltimore | — | 11–8 | 4–3 | 3–4 | 4–2 | 4–2 | 3–4 | 5–2 | 3–3 | 9–10 | 5–2 | 2–4 | 6–13 | 5–2 | 10–9 | 11–9 |
| Boston | 8–11 | — | 4–2 | 6–1 | 3–4 | 6–1 | 2–5 | 3–3 | 4–3 | 13–6 | 3–3 | 6–1 | 12–7 | 2–4 | 11–8 | 14–6 |
| Chicago | 3–4 | 2–4 | — | 2–17 | 7–12 | 3–4 | 9–10 | 3–4 | 8–11 | 3–3 | 2–5 | 3–3 | 2–5 | 4–2 | 4–3 | 8–12 |
| Cleveland | 4–3 | 1–6 | 17–2 | — | 4–15 | 6–1 | 10–9 | 4–2 | 13–6 | 1–6 | 5–2 | 5–2 | 2–4 | 5–1 | 4–2 | 11–9 |
| Detroit | 2–4 | 4–3 | 12–7 | 15–4 | — | 6–1 | 9–10 | 0–6 | 11–8 | 3–3 | 3–4 | 5–2 | 3–3 | 3–4 | 5–2 | 12–8 |
| Houston | 2–4 | 1–6 | 4–3 | 1–6 | 1–6 | — | 2–4 | 10–9 | 1–5 | 1–5 | 4–15 | 9–10 | 2–5 | 2–17 | 3–4 | 8–12 |
| Kansas City | 4–3 | 5–2 | 10–9 | 9–10 | 10–9 | 4–2 | — | 2–5 | 15–4 | 2–5 | 1–5 | 4–3 | 6–1 | 3–3 | 2–4 | 9–11 |
| Los Angeles | 2–5 | 3–3 | 4–3 | 2–4 | 6–0 | 9–10 | 5–2 | — | 1–5 | 3–4 | 8–11 | 11–8 | 4–3 | 4–15 | 6–1 | 10–10 |
| Minnesota | 3–3 | 3–4 | 11–8 | 6–13 | 8–11 | 5–1 | 4–15 | 5–1 | — | 2–5 | 1–6 | 4–3 | 1–6 | 4–3 | 1–5 | 8–12 |
| New York | 10–9 | 6–13 | 3–3 | 6–1 | 3–3 | 5–1 | 5–2 | 4–3 | 5–2 | — | 1–5 | 4–3 | 7–12 | 3–4 | 14–5 | 9–11 |
| Oakland | 2–5 | 3–3 | 5–2 | 2–5 | 4–3 | 15–4 | 5–1 | 11–8 | 6–1 | 5–1 | — | 8–11 | 3–3 | 10–9 | 4–3 | 13–7 |
| Seattle | 4–2 | 1–6 | 3–3 | 2–5 | 2–5 | 10–9 | 3–4 | 8–11 | 3–4 | 3–4 | 11–8 | — | 3–3 | 7–12 | 3–3 | 8–12 |
| Tampa Bay | 13–6 | 7–12 | 5–2 | 4–2 | 3–3 | 5–2 | 1–6 | 3–4 | 6–1 | 12–7 | 3–3 | 3–3 | — | 4–4 | 11–8 | 12–8 |
| Texas | 2–5 | 4–2 | 2–4 | 1–5 | 4–3 | 17–2 | 3–3 | 15–4 | 3–4 | 4–3 | 9–10 | 12–7 | 4–4 | — | 1–6 | 10–10 |
| Toronto | 9–10 | 8–11 | 3–4 | 2–4 | 2–5 | 4–3 | 4–2 | 1–6 | 5–1 | 5–14 | 3–4 | 3–3 | 8–11 | 6–1 | — | 11–9 |

== Schedule ==
=== Regular season ===
2013 Game Log
April (12–14)

| # | Date | Opponent | Score | Win | Loss | Save | Attendance | Record | Recap |
|---|---|---|---|---|---|---|---|---|---|
| 1 | April 2 | Orioles | 4–7 | Hammel (1–0) | McGee (0–1) | Johnson (1) | 34,078 | 0–1 | |
| 2 | April 3 | Orioles | 8–7 | Rodney (1–0) | Hunter (0–1) | | 15,599 | 1–1 | |
| 3 | April 4 | Orioles | 3–6 | González (1–0) | Hernández (0–1) | Johnson (2) | 17,491 | 1–2 | |
| 4 | April 5 | Indians | 4–0 | Moore (1–0) | McAllister (0–1) | | 16,019 | 2–2 | |
| 5 | April 6 | Indians | 6–0 | Cobb (1–0) | Bauer (0–1) | | 32,217 | 3–2 | |
| 6 | April 7 | Indians | 0–13 | Masterson (2–0) | Price (0–1) | | 21,629 | 3–3 | |
| 7 | April 8 | @ Rangers | 4–5 | Ogando (2–0) | Hellickson (0–1) | Nathan (2) | 27,355 | 3–4 | |
| 8 | April 9 | @ Rangers | 1–6 | Tepesch (1–0) | Hernández (0–2) | | 31,398 | 3–5 | |
| 9 | April 10 | @ Rangers | 2–0 | Moore (2–0) | Holland (0–1) | Rodney (1) | 26,643 | 4–5 | |
| — | April 12 | @ Red Sox | Postponed (rain); Makeup: June 18 | | | | | | |
| 10 | April 13 | @ Red Sox | 1–2 (10) | Tazawa (2–0) | Gomes (0–1) | | 33,039 | 4–6 | |
| 11 | April 14 | @ Red Sox | 0–5 | Buchholz (3–0) | Cobb (1–1) | | 35,198 | 4–7 | |
| 12 | April 15 | @ Red Sox | 2–3 | Bailey (1–0) | Peralta (0–1) | | 37,449 | 4–8 | |
| 13 | April 16 | @ Orioles | 4–5 | Arrieta (1–0) | Hernández (0–3) | Johnson (6) | 14,670 | 4–9 | |
| 14 | April 17 | @ Orioles | 6–2 | Moore (3–0) | Tillman (0–1) | | 13,591 | 5–9 | |
| 15 | April 18 | @ Orioles | 6–10 (10) | Patton (1–0) | Wright (0–1) | | 13,986 | 5–10 | |
| 16 | April 19 | Athletics | 8–3 | Cobb (2–1) | Anderson (1–3) | | 15,115 | 6–10 | |
| 17 | April 20 | Athletics | 1–0 | Hellickson (1–1) | Parker (0–3) | Rodney (2) | 25,611 | 7–10 | |
| 18 | April 21 | Athletics | 8–1 | Hernández (1–3) | Milone (3–1) | | 25,954 | 8–10 | |
| 19 | April 22 | Yankees | 5–1 | Moore (4–0) | Sabathia (3–2) | | 15,331 | 9–10 | |
| 20 | April 23 | Yankees | 3–4 | Robertson (1–0) | Price (0–2) | Rivera (6) | 17,644 | 9–11 | |
| 21 | April 24 | Yankees | 3–0 | Cobb (3–1) | Pettitte (3–1) | Rodney (3) | 19,177 | 10–11 | |
| 22 | April 25 | @ White Sox | 2–5 | Sale (2–2) | Hellickson (1–2) | Reed (7) | 15,056 | 10–12 | |
| 23 | April 26 | @ White Sox | 4–5 | Peavy (3–1) | Hernández (1–4) | Reed (8) | 20,008 | 10–13 | |
| 24 | April 27 | @ White Sox | 10–4 | Moore (5–0) | Floyd (0–4) | | 25,270 | 11–13 | |
| 25 | April 28 | @ White Sox | 8–3 | Price (1–2) | Jones (0–2) | | 22,677 | 12–13 | |
| 26 | April 30 | @ Royals | 2–8 | Shields (2–2) | Cobb (3–2) | | 12,378 | 12–14 | |

May (18–10)

| # | Date | Opponent | Score | Win | Loss | Save | Attendance | Record | Recap |
|---|---|---|---|---|---|---|---|---|---|
| 27 | May 1 | @ Royals | 8–9 | Chen (0–2) | McGee (0–2) | Holland (7) | 11,514 | 12–15 | |
| — | May 2 | @ Royals | Postponed (rain); Makeup: August 26 | | | | | | |
| 28 | May 3 | @ Rockies | 7–4 (10) | Farnsworth (1–0) | Belisle (1–2) | Rodney (4) | 30,255 | 13–15 | |
| 29 | May 4 | @ Rockies | 3–9 | Garland (3–2) | Price (1–3) | | 29,099 | 13–16 | |
| 30 | May 5 | @ Rockies | 8–3 | Cobb (4–2) | Chacín (3–1) | | 39,220 | 14–16 | |
| 31 | May 6 | Blue Jays | 7–8 | Oliver (1–1) | Rodney (1–1) | Janssen (8) | 9,952 | 14–17 | |
| 32 | May 7 | Blue Jays | 4–6 | Delabar (3–1) | Peralta (0–2) | Janssen (9) | 10,273 | 14–18 | |
| 33 | May 8 | Blue Jays | 10–4 | Moore (6–0) | Romero (0–2) | | 11,075 | 15–18 | |
| 34 | May 9 | Blue Jays | 5–4 (10) | Farnsworth (2–0) | Loup (1–3) | | 11,979 | 16–18 | |
| 35 | May 10 | Padres | 6–3 | McGee (1–2) | Thayer (0–2) | Rodney (5) | 12,424 | 17–18 | |
| 36 | May 11 | Padres | 8–7 | Ramos (1–0) | Street (0–2) | | 18,587 | 18–18 | |
| 37 | May 12 | Padres | 4–2 | Hernández (2–4) | Stults (3–3) | Rodney (6) | 17,396 | 19–18 | |
| 38 | May 14 | Red Sox | 5–3 | Moore (7–0) | Lackey (1–4) | Rodney (7) | 15,227 | 20–18 | |
| 39 | May 15 | Red Sox | 2–9 | Lester (6–0) | Price (1–4) | | 15,767 | 20–19 | |
| 40 | May 16 | Red Sox | 3–4 | Tazawa (3–2) | Rodney (1–2) | | 16,055 | 20–20 | |
| 41 | May 17 | @ Orioles | 12–10 | Hellickson (2–2) | Hammel (5–2) | Peralta (1) | 38,061 | 21–20 | |
| 42 | May 18 | @ Orioles | 10–6 | Torres (1–0) | Johnson (1–4) | | 34,685 | 22–20 | |
| 43 | May 19 | @ Orioles | 3–1 | Moore (8–0) | Tillman (3–2) | Rodney (8) | 37,704 | 23–20 | |
| 44 | May 20 | @ Blue Jays | 5–7 | Dickey (4–5) | Lueke (0–1) | | 29,885 | 23–21 | |
| 45 | May 21 | @ Blue Jays | 4–3 | Cobb (5–2) | Ortiz (1–2) | Rodney (9) | 15,802 | 24–21 | |
| 46 | May 22 | @ Blue Jays | 3–4 (10) | Loup (2–3) | Ramos (1–1) | | 18,771 | 24–22 | |
| 47 | May 24 | Yankees | 4–9 | Phelps (3–2) | Hernández (2–5) | | 17,825 | 24–23 | |
| 48 | May 25 | Yankees | 3–4 (11) | Nova (2–1) | Lueke (0–2) | Rivera (18) | 25,874 | 24–24 | |
| 49 | May 26 | Yankees | 8–3 | Cobb (6–2) | Sabathia (4–4) | | 24,159 | 25–24 | |
| 50 | May 27 | Marlins | 10–6 | McGee (2–2) | Fernández (2–3) | | 13,025 | 26–24 | |
| 51 | May 28 | Marlins | 7–6 | Rodney (2–2) | Dunn (1–1) | | 13,876 | 27–24 | |
| 52 | May 29 | @ Marlins | 3–1 | Hernández (3–5) | Koehler (0–3) | Rodney (10) | 16,671 | 28–24 | |
| 53 | May 30 | @ Marlins | 5–2 | Colomé (1–0) | Nolasco (3–6) | Rodney (11) | 23,199 | 29–24 | |
| 54 | May 31 | @ Indians | 9–2 | Wright (1–1) | Barnes (0–1) | Ramos (1) | 29,603 | 30–24 | |

June (13–15)

| # | Date | Opponent | Score | Win | Loss | Save | Attendance | Record | Recap |
|---|---|---|---|---|---|---|---|---|---|
| 55 | June 1 | @ Indians | 0–5 | Jiménez (4–3) | Archer (0–1) | | 22,748 | 30–25 | |
| 56 | June 2 | @ Indians | 11–3 | Hellickson (3–2) | McAllister (4–5) | | 18,106 | 31–25 | |
| 57 | June 4 | @ Tigers | 1–10 | Sánchez (6–5) | Moore (8–1) | | 30,569 | 31–26 | |
| 58 | June 5 | @ Tigers | 3–0 | Peralta (1–2) | Fister (5–3) | Rodney (12) | 30,005 | 32–26 | |
| 59 | June 6 | @ Tigers | 2–5 | Scherzer (8–0) | Hernández (3–6) | Valverde (7) | 36,168 | 32–27 | |
| 60 | June 7 | Orioles | 2–1 | Archer (1–1) | Hammel (7–4) | Rodney (13) | 13,256 | 33–27 | |
| 61 | June 8 | Orioles | 8–0 | Hellickson (4–2) | Gausman (0–3) | | 21,834 | 34–27 | |
| 62 | June 9 | Orioles | 7–10 | Tillman (6–2) | Moore (8–2) | Johnson (21) | 19,921 | 34–28 | |
| 63 | June 10 | Red Sox | 8–10 (14) | Morales (2–0) | Ramos (1–2) | | 15,477 | 34–29 | |
| 64 | June 11 | Red Sox | 8–3 | Hernández (4–6) | Lester (6–3) | | 16,870 | 35–29 | |
| 65 | June 12 | Red Sox | 1–2 | Aceves (3–1) | Archer (1–2) | Bailey (7) | 15,091 | 35–30 | |
| 66 | June 13 | Royals | 1–10 | Santana (5–5) | Hellickson (4–3) | | 11,398 | 35–31 | |
| 67 | June 14 | Royals | 2–7 | Mendoza (2–3) | Moore (8–3) | | 13,407 | 35–32 | |
| 68 | June 15 | Royals | 5–3 | Torres (2–0) | Guthrie (7–4) | Rodney (14) | 18,593 | 36–32 | |
| 69 | June 16 | Royals | 3–5 | Davis (4–5) | Hernández (4–7) | Holland (14) | 27,442 | 36–33 | |
| 70 | June 18 (1) | @ Red Sox | 1–5 | Aceves (4–1) | Archer (1–3) | | 33,430 | 36–34 | |
| 71 | June 18 (2) | @ Red Sox | 1–3 | Bailey (3–0) | Peralta (1–3) | | 32,156 | 36–35 | |
| 72 | June 19 | @ Red Sox | 6–2 | Hellickson (5–3) | Dempster (4–8) | | 35,710 | 37–35 | |
| 73 | June 20 | @ Yankees | 8–3 | Moore (9–3) | Pettitte (5–5) | | 37,649 | 38–35 | |
| 74 | June 21 | @ Yankees | 2–6 | Phelps (5–4) | Hernández (4–8) | | 41,123 | 38–36 | |
| 75 | June 22 | @ Yankees | 5–7 | Sabathia (8–5) | Peralta (1–4) | Rivera (24) | 46,013 | 38–37 | |
| 76 | June 23 | @ Yankees | 3–1 | Archer (2–3) | Nova (2–2) | Rodney (15) | 46,054 | 39–37 | |
| 77 | June 24 | Blue Jays | 4–1 | Hellickson (6–3) | Robers (3–3) | Rodney (16) | 11,407 | 40–37 | |
| 78 | June 25 | Blue Jays | 5–1 | Moore (10–3) | Buehrle (4–5) | | 12,041 | 41–37 | |
| 79 | June 26 | Blue Jays | 0–3 | Dickey (8–9) | Hernández (4–9) | | 21,502 | 41–38 | |
| 80 | June 28 | Tigers | 3–6 | Scherzer (12–0) | Colomé (1–1) | Benoit (5) | 17,645 | 41–39 | |
| 81 | June 29 | Tigers | 4–3 (10) | Rodney (3–2) | Rondón (0–1) | | 23,809 | 42–39 | |
| 82 | June 30 | Tigers | 3–1 | Hellickson (7–3) | Porcello (4–6) | Rodney (17) | 23,427 | 43–39 | |

July (21–5)

| # | Date | Opponent | Score | Win | Loss | Save | Attendance | Record | Recap |
|---|---|---|---|---|---|---|---|---|---|
| 83 | July 1 | @ Astros | 12–0 | Moore (11–3) | Keuchel (4–5) | | 12,722 | 44–39 | |
| 84 | July 2 | @ Astros | 8–0 | Price (2–4) | Bédard (3–4) | | 19,631 | 45–39 | |
| 85 | July 3 | @ Astros | 1–4 | Norris (6–7) | Hernández (4–10) | Veras (17) | 14,143 | 45–40 | |
| 86 | July 4 | @ Astros | 7–5 (11) | Wright (2–1) | Fields (0–1) | Rodney (18) | 20,470 | 46–40 | |
| 87 | July 5 | White Sox | 8–3 | Hellickson (8–3) | Axelrod (3–5) | | 15,825 | 47–40 | |
| 88 | July 6 | White Sox | 3–0 | Moore (12–3) | Sale (5–8) | Rodney (19) | 21,047 | 48–40 | |
| 89 | July 7 | White Sox | 3–1 | Price (3–4) | Danks (2–6) | | 16,832 | 49–40 | |
| 90 | July 8 | Twins | 7–4 | Torres (3–0) | Deduno (4–4) | Rodney (20) | 11,516 | 50–40 | |
| 91 | July 9 | Twins | 4–1 | Archer (3–3) | Gibson (1–2) | Rodney (21) | 12,777 | 51–40 | |
| 92 | July 10 | Twins | 4–3 (13) | Ramos (2–2) | Pressly (2–1) | | 12,757 | 52–40 | |
| 93 | July 11 | Twins | 4–3 | Moore (13–3) | Pelfrey (4–7) | McGee (1) | 24,571 | 53–40 | |
| 94 | July 12 | Astros | 1–2 | Cosart (1–0) | Price (3–5) | Veras (18) | 13,347 | 53–41 | |
| 95 | July 13 | Astros | 4–3 | Hernández (5–10) | Harrell (5–10) | Rodney (22) | 20,409 | 54–41 | |
| 96 | July 14 | Astros | 5–0 | Archer (4–3) | Bédard (3–6) | | 21,180 | 55–41 | |
All-Star Break
| 97 | July 19 | @ Blue Jays | 8–5 | Price (4–5) | Cecil (3–1) | | 33,266 | 56–41 | |
| 98 | July 20 | @ Blue Jays | 4–3 | Hellickson (9–3) | Buehrle (5–7) | Rodney (23) | 42,639 | 57–41 | |
| 99 | July 21 | @ Blue Jays | 4–3 | Archer (5–3) | Dickey (8–11) | Rodney (24) | 41,247 | 58–41 | |
| 100 | July 22 | @ Red Sox | 3–0 | Moore (14–3) | Workman (0–1) | | 35,016 | 59–41 | |
| 101 | July 23 | @ Red Sox | 2–6 | Lester (9–6) | Hernández (5–11) | | 34,609 | 59–42 | |
| 102 | July 24 | @ Red Sox | 5–1 | Price (5–5) | Doubront (7–4) | | 26,514 | 60–42 | |
| – | July 25 | @ Red Sox | Postponed (rain); Makeup: July 29 | | | | | | |
| 103 | July 26 | @ Yankees | 10–6 | Hellickson (10–3) | Sabathia (9–9) | Rodney (25) | 44,486 | 61–42 | |
| 104 | July 27 | @ Yankees | 1–0 | Archer (6–3) | Nova (4–4) | | 43,424 | 62–42 | |
| 105 | July 28 | @ Yankees | 5–6 | Rivera (2–2) | McGee (2–3) | | 47,714 | 62–43 | |
| 106 | July 29 | @ Red Sox | 2–1 | Price (6–5) | Doubront (7–5) | Rodney (26) | 37,242 | 63–43 | |
| 107 | July 30 | Diamondbacks | 5–2 | Hernández (6–11) | Kennedy (3–8) | | 17,402 | 64–43 | |
| 108 | July 31 | Diamondbacks | 0–7 | Miley (8–8) | Hellickson (10–4) | | 25,095 | 64–44 | |

August (11–15)

| # | Date | Opponent | Score | Win | Loss | Save | Attendance | Record | Recap |
|---|---|---|---|---|---|---|---|---|---|
| 109 | August 2 | Giants | 1–4 | Bumgarner (11–6) | Archer (6–4) | Romo (26) | 20,144 | 64–45 | |
| 110 | August 3 | Giants | 2–1 | Rodney (4–2) | Machi (2–1) | | 31,969 | 65–45 | |
| 111 | August 4 | Giants | 4–3 | Torres (4–0) | Mijares (0–3) | Rodney (27) | 34,078 | 66–45 | |
| 112 | August 6 | @ Diamondbacks | 1–6 | Miley (9–8) | Hellickson (10–5) | | 19,458 | 66–46 | |
| 113 | August 7 | @ Diamondbacks | 8–9 | Putz (3–1) | Peralta (1–5) | Ziegler (7) | 18,733 | 66–47 | |
| 114 | August 9 | @ Dodgers | 6–7 | Belisario (5–6) | Rodney (4–3) | | 51,083 | 66–48 | |
| 115 | August 10 | @ Dodgers | 0–5 | Greinke (10–3) | Hernández (6–12) | | 52,619 | 66–49 | |
| 116 | August 11 | @ Dodgers | 2–8 | Kershaw (11–7) | Hellickson (10–6) | | 52,248 | 66–50 | |
| 117 | August 13 | Mariners | 4–5 | Ramírez (4–0) | Archer (6–5) | Farquhar (5) | 13,294 | 66–51 | |
| 118 | August 14 | Mariners | 5–4 | Peralta (2–5) | Farquhar (0–1) | | 14,910 | 67–51 | |
| 119 | August 15 | Mariners | 7–1 | Cobb (7–2) | Saunders (10–12) | | 13,299 | 68–51 | |
| 120 | August 16 | Blue Jays | 5–4 | Rodney (5–2) | Loup (4–6) | | 15,433 | 69–51 | |
| 121 | August 17 | Blue Jays | 2–6 | Happ (3–2) | Hernández (6–13) | | 25,036 | 69–52 | |
| 122 | August 18 | Blue Jays | 2–1 (10) | McGee (3–3) | Lincoln (1–2) | | 23,373 | 70–52 | |
| 123 | August 19 | @ Orioles | 4–3 | Price (7–5) | Tillman (11–4) | Rodney (28) | 25,044 | 71–52 | |
| 124 | August 20 | @ Orioles | 7–4 | Cobb (8–2) | González (8–6) | Rodney (29) | 26,158 | 72–52 | |
| 125 | August 21 | @ Orioles | 2–4 | Chen (7–6) | Hellickson (10–7) | Hunter (4) | 28,323 | 72–53 | |
| 126 | August 23 | Yankees | 7–2 | Archer (7–5) | Kuroda (11–9) | | 24,239 | 73–53 | |
| 127 | August 24 | Yankees | 4–2 | Price (8–5) | Sabathia (11–11) | Rodney (30) | 32,862 | 74–53 | |
| 128 | August 25 | Yankees | 2–3 (11) | Logan (4–2) | Wright (2–2) | Rivera (38) | 34,078 | 74–54 | |
| 129 | August 26 | @ Royals | 1–11 | Guthrie (13–10) | Hellickson (10–8) | | 20,546 | 74–55 | |
| 130 | August 27 | Angels | 5–6 | Frieri (2–4) | Rodney (5–4) | De La Rosa (2) | 12,939 | 74–56 | |
| 131 | August 28 | Angels | 4–1 | Archer (8–5) | Richards (4–6) | Rodney (31) | 13,535 | 75–56 | |
| 132 | August 29 | Angels | 0–2 | Vargas (8–5) | Odorizzi (0–1) | Frieri (28) | 15,741 | 75–57 | |
| 133 | August 30 | @ Athletics | 3–4 | Cook (6–3) | Price (8–6) | Balfour (34) | 15,603 | 75–58 | |
| 134 | August 31 | @ Athletics | 1–2 | Gray (2–2) | Cobb (8–3) | Balfour (35) | 35,067 | 75–59 | |

September (17–12)

| # | Date | Opponent | Score | Win | Loss | Save | Attendance | Record | Recap |
|---|---|---|---|---|---|---|---|---|---|
| 135 | September 1 | @ Athletics | 1–5 | Griffin (12–9) | Torres (4–1) | | 18,639 | 75–60 | |
| 136 | September 2 | @ Angels | 2–11 | Richards (5–6) | Archer (8–6) | | 37,557 | 75–61 | |
| 137 | September 3 | @ Angels | 7–1 | Moore (15–3) | Vargas (8–6) | Hernández (1) | 34,332 | 76–61 | |
| 138 | September 4 | @ Angels | 3–1 | Hellickson (11–8) | Weaver (9–8) | Rodney (32) | 34,025 | 77–61 | |
| 139 | September 5 | @ Angels | 2–6 | Williams (6–2) | Price (8–7) | | 34,623 | 77–62 | |
| 140 | September 6 | @ Mariners | 4–6 | Capps (3–3) | Peralta (2–6) | Farquhar (13) | 14,796 | 77–63 | |
| 141 | September 7 | @ Mariners | 2–6 | Paxton (1–0) | Archer (8–7) | | 17,773 | 77–64 | |
| 142 | September 8 | @ Mariners | 4–1 | McGee (4–3) | Medina (4–5) | Rodney (33) | 18,645 | 78–64 | |
| 143 | September 10 | Red Sox | 0–2 | Buchholz (10–0) | Price (8–8) | Uehara (19) | 18,605 | 78–65 | |
| 144 | September 11 | Red Sox | 3–7 (10) | Uehara (4–0) | Peralta (2–7) | | 19,215 | 78–66 | |
| 145 | September 12 | Red Sox | 4–3 | McGee (3–5) | De La Rosa (0–1) | Rodney (34) | 20,360 | 79–66 | |
| 146 | September 13 | @ Twins | 3–0 | Archer (9–7) | Correia (9–12) | Rodney (35) | 27,292 | 80–66 | |
| 147 | September 14 | @ Twins | 7–0 | Gomes (1–1) | Albers (2–3) | | 28,541 | 81–66 | |
| 148 | September 15 | @ Twins | 4–6 | Fien (5–2) | Peralta (2–8) | Perkins (35) | 27,988 | 81–67 | |
| 149 | September 16 | Rangers | 6–2 | Cobb (9–3) | Garza (9–6) | | 10,724 | 82–67 | |
| 150 | September 17 | Rangers | 1–7 | Ogando (7–4) | Hellickson (11–9) | | 10,786 | 82–68 | |
| 151 | September 18 | Rangers | 4–3 (12) | Gomes (2–1) | Ortiz (2–2) | | 14,827 | 83–68 | |
| 152 | September 19 | Rangers | 2–8 | Darvish (13–9) | Moore (15–4) | | 13,550 | 83–69 | |
| 153 | September 20 | Orioles | 5–4 (18) | Hellickson (12–9) | Norris (10–12) | | 21,247 | 84–69 | |
| 154 | September 21 | Orioles | 5–1 | Cobb (10–3) | González (10–8) | | 23,835 | 85–69 | |
| 155 | September 22 | Orioles | 3–1 | Gomes (3–1) | Feldman (12–11) | Rodney (36) | 28,974 | 86–69 | |
| 156 | September 23 | Orioles | 5–4 | Peralta (3–8) | Hunter (6–5) | | 17,830 | 87–69 | |
| 157 | September 24 | @ Yankees | 7–0 | Moore (16–4) | Kuroda (11–13) | Odorizzi (1) | 43,407 | 88–69 | |
| 158 | September 25 | @ Yankees | 8–3 | Price (9–8) | Hughes (4–14) | | 37,260 | 89–69 | |
| 159 | September 26 | @ Yankees | 4–0 | Cobb (11–3) | Nova (9–6) | | 48,675 | 90–69 | |
| 160 | September 27 | @ Blue Jays | 3–6 | Dickey (14–13) | Hellickson (12–10) | Santos (1) | 27,288 | 90–70 | |
| 161 | September 28 | @ Blue Jays | 2–7 | Happ (5–7) | Torres (4–2) | | 33,232 | 90–71 | |
| 162 | September 29 | @ Blue Jays | 7–6 | Moore (17–4) | Redmond (4–3) | Rodney (37) | 44,551 | 91–71 | |
| 163 | September 30 | @ Rangers | 5–2 | Price (10–8) | Pérez (10–6) | | 42,796 | 92–71 | |

=== Postseason ===
2013 Postseason Game Log
American League Wild Card Game

| Date | Opponent | Score | Win | Loss | Save | Location/Attendance | Series | Recap |
|---|---|---|---|---|---|---|---|---|
| October 2 | @ Indians | 4–0 | Cobb (1–0) | Salazar (0–1) | | Progressive Field; 43,579 | 1–0 | |

American League Division Series

| Game | Date | Opponent | Score | Win | Loss | Save | Location/Attendance | Series | Recap |
|---|---|---|---|---|---|---|---|---|---|
| 1 | October 4 | @ Red Sox | 2–12 | Lester (1–0) | Moore (0–1) | | Fenway Park; 38,177 | 0–1 | |
| 2 | October 5 | @ Red Sox | 4–7 | Lackey (1–0) | Price (0–1) | Uehara (1) | Fenway Park; 38,705 | 0–2 | |
| 3 | October 7 | Red Sox | 5–4 | Rodney (1–0) | Uehara (0–1) | | Tropicana Field; 33,675 | 1–2 | |
| 4 | October 8 | Red Sox | 1–3 | Breslow (1–0) | McGee (0–1) | Uehara (2) | Tropicana Field; 32,807 | 1–3 | |

=== Detailed records ===
American League
| Opponent | Home | Away | Total | Pct. | Runs scored | Runs allowed |
AL East
| Baltimore Orioles | 7–3 | 6–3 | 13–6 | .684 | 104 | 86 |
| Boston Red Sox | 3–6 | 4–6 | 7–12 | .368 | 57 | 71 |
| New York Yankees | 5–4 | 7–3 | 12–7 | .632 | 92 | 60 |
| Tampa Bay Rays | – | – | – | – | – | – |
| Toronto Blue Jays | 6–4 | 5–4 | 11–8 | .579 | 83 | 81 |
| | 21–17 | 22–16 | 43–33 | .566 | 336 | 298 |
AL Central
| Chicago White Sox | 3–0 | 2–2 | 5–2 | .714 | 38 | 21 |
| Cleveland Indians | 2–1 | 2–1 | 4–2 | .667 | 30 | 23 |
| Detroit Tigers | 2–1 | 1–2 | 3–3 | .500 | 16 | 25 |
| Kansas City Royals | 1–3 | 0–3 | 1–6 | .143 | 22 | 53 |
| Minnesota Twins | 4–0 | 2–1 | 6–1 | .857 | 33 | 17 |
| | 12–5 | 7–9 | 19–14 | .576 | 139 | 139 |
AL West
| Houston Astros | 2–1 | 3–1 | 5–2 | .714 | 38 | 14 |
| Los Angeles Angels | 1–2 | 2–2 | 3–4 | .429 | 23 | 28 |
| Oakland Athletics | 3–0 | 0–3 | 3–3 | .500 | 22 | 15 |
| Seattle Mariners | 2–1 | 1–2 | 3–3 | .500 | 26 | 23 |
| Texas Rangers | 2–2 | 2–2 | 4–4 | .500 | 25 | 33 |
| | 10–6 | 8–10 | 18–16 | .529 | 128 | 111 |

National League
| Opponent | Home | Away | Total | Pct. | Runs scored | Runs allowed |
| Arizona Diamondbacks | 1–1 | 0–2 | 1–3 | .250 | 14 | 24 |
| Colorado Rockies | 0–0 | 2–1 | 2–1 | .667 | 18 | 16 |
| Los Angeles Dodgers | 0–0 | 0–3 | 0–3 | .000 | 8 | 20 |
| Miami Marlins | 2–0 | 2–0 | 4–0 | 1.000 | 25 | 15 |
| San Diego Padres | 3–0 | 0–0 | 3–0 | 1.000 | 18 | 12 |
| San Francisco Giants | 2–1 | 0–0 | 2–1 | .667 | 7 | 8 |
| | 8–2 | 4–6 | 12–8 | .600 | 90 | 95 |

== Roster ==
2013 Tampa Bay Rays
Roster
| Pitchers: 22 Chris Archer; 38 Jeff Beliveau; 53 Alex Cobb; 37 Álex Colomé; 43 Kyle Farnsworth; 47 Brandon Gomes; 58 Jeremy Hellickson; 40 Roberto Hernández; 52 Josh Lueke; 57 Jake McGee; 55 Matt Moore; 23 Jake Odorizzi; 62 Joel Peralta; 14 David Price; 27 Cesar Ramos; 56 Fernando Rodney; 45 Enny Romero; 54 Alex Torres; 35 Jamey Wright; 49 Wesley Wright | Catchers: 59 José Lobatón; 28 José Molina; Infielders: 29 Tim Beckham; 15 Shelley Duncan; 11 Yunel Escobar; 16 Chris Gimenez; 21 James Loney; 3 Evan Longoria; 19 Ryan Roberts; 18 Ben Zobrist | Outfielders: 13 Jason Bourgeois; 7 David DeJesus; 5 Sam Fuld; 8 Desmond Jennings; 2 Kelly Johnson; 20 Matthew Joyce; 41 Kevin Kiermaier; 9 Wil Myers; 1 Sean Rodriguez; 30 Luke Scott; 15 Delmon Young; Other batters: 43 Freddy Guzmán | Manager: 70 Joe Maddon; Coaches: 46 Stan Boroski (bullpen); 77 Scott Cursi (bullpen catcher); 6 Tom Foley (third base); 25 George Hendrick (first base); 48 Jim Hickey (pitching); 4 Dave Martinez (bench); 44 Jamie Nelson (assistant hitting); 17 Derek Shelton (hitting); 65 Don Zimmer (coach) |

== Player stats ==
=== Batting ===
Note: G = Games played; AB = At bats; R = Runs scored; H = Hits; 2B = Doubles; 3B = Triples; HR = Home runs; RBI = Runs batted in; AVG = Batting average; SB = Stolen bases

| Player | G | AB | R | H | 2B | 3B | HR | RBI | AVG | SB |
|---|---|---|---|---|---|---|---|---|---|---|
| José Molina | 99 | 283 | 26 | 66 | 14 | 0 | 2 | 18 | .233 | 2 |
| James Loney | 158 | 549 | 54 | 164 | 33 | 0 | 13 | 75 | .299 | 3 |
| Ben Zobrist | 157 | 612 | 77 | 168 | 36 | 3 | 12 | 71 | .275 | 11 |
| Yunel Escobar | 153 | 508 | 61 | 130 | 27 | 1 | 9 | 56 | .256 | 4 |
| Evan Longoria | 160 | 614 | 91 | 165 | 39 | 3 | 32 | 88 | .269 | 1 |
| Kelly Johnson | 118 | 366 | 41 | 86 | 12 | 2 | 16 | 52 | .235 | 7 |
| Desmond Jennings | 139 | 527 | 82 | 133 | 31 | 6 | 14 | 54 | .252 | 20 |
| Wil Myers | 88 | 335 | 50 | 98 | 23 | 0 | 13 | 53 | .293 | 5 |
| Luke Scott | 91 | 253 | 27 | 61 | 13 | 2 | 9 | 40 | .241 | 1 |
| Matt Joyce | 140 | 413 | 61 | 97 | 22 | 0 | 18 | 47 | .235 | 7 |
| José Lobatón | 100 | 277 | 38 | 69 | 15 | 2 | 7 | 32 | .249 | 0 |
| Sean Rodriguez | 96 | 195 | 21 | 48 | 10 | 1 | 5 | 23 | .246 | 1 |
| Sam Fuld | 118 | 176 | 25 | 35 | 0 | 3 | 2 | 17 | .199 | 8 |
| Ryan Roberts | 60 | 162 | 15 | 40 | 6 | 0 | 5 | 17 | .247 | 0 |
| David DeJesus | 35 | 104 | 13 | 27 | 10 | 0 | 2 | 11 | .260 | 2 |
| Delmon Young | 23 | 62 | 8 | 16 | 3 | 0 | 3 | 7 | .258 | 0 |
| Shelley Duncan | 20 | 55 | 6 | 10 | 1 | 0 | 2 | 6 | .182 | 0 |
| Jason Bourgeois | 9 | 16 | 2 | 3 | 0 | 0 | 1 | 2 | .188 | 0 |
| Tim Beckham | 5 | 7 | 1 | 3 | 0 | 0 | 0 | 1 | .429 | 0 |
| Chris Gimenez | 4 | 3 | 0 | 1 | 1 | 0 | 0 | 0 | .333 | 0 |
| Kevin Kiermaier | 1 | 0 | 0 | 0 | 0 | 0 | 0 | 0 | ---- | 0 |
| Freddy Guzmán | 1 | 0 | 1 | 0 | 0 | 0 | 0 | 0 | ---- | 1 |
| Pitcher totals | 163 | 21 | 0 | 1 | 0 | 0 | 0 | 0 | .048 | 0 |
| Team totals | 163 | 5538 | 700 | 1421 | 296 | 23 | 165 | 670 | .257 | 73 |

=== Pitching ===
Note: W = Wins; L = Losses; ERA = Earned run average; G = Games pitched; GS = Games started; SV = Saves; IP = Innings pitched; H = Hits allowed; R = Runs allowed; ER = Earned runs allowed; BB = Walks allowed; K = Strikeouts

| Player | W | L | ERA | G | GS | SV | IP | H | R | ER | BB | K |
|---|---|---|---|---|---|---|---|---|---|---|---|---|
| David Price | 10 | 8 | 3.33 | 27 | 27 | 0 | 186.2 | 178 | 78 | 69 | 27 | 151 |
| Jeremy Hellickson | 12 | 10 | 5.17 | 32 | 31 | 0 | 174.0 | 185 | 103 | 100 | 50 | 135 |
| Roberto Hernández | 6 | 13 | 4.89 | 32 | 24 | 1 | 151.0 | 164 | 87 | 82 | 38 | 113 |
| Matt Moore | 17 | 4 | 3.29 | 27 | 27 | 0 | 150.1 | 119 | 58 | 55 | 76 | 143 |
| Alex Cobb | 11 | 3 | 2.76 | 22 | 22 | 0 | 143.1 | 120 | 46 | 44 | 45 | 134 |
| Chris Archer | 9 | 7 | 3.22 | 23 | 23 | 0 | 128.2 | 107 | 49 | 46 | 38 | 101 |
| Joel Peralta | 3 | 8 | 3.41 | 80 | 0 | 1 | 71.1 | 47 | 31 | 27 | 34 | 74 |
| Jamey Wright | 2 | 2 | 3.09 | 66 | 1 | 0 | 70.0 | 61 | 25 | 24 | 23 | 65 |
| Cesar Ramos | 2 | 2 | 4.14 | 48 | 0 | 1 | 67.1 | 66 | 31 | 31 | 22 | 53 |
| Fernando Rodney | 5 | 4 | 3.38 | 68 | 0 | 37 | 66.2 | 53 | 27 | 25 | 36 | 82 |
| Jake McGee | 5 | 3 | 4.02 | 71 | 0 | 1 | 62.2 | 52 | 28 | 28 | 22 | 75 |
| Alex Torres | 4 | 2 | 1.71 | 39 | 0 | 0 | 58.0 | 32 | 12 | 11 | 20 | 62 |
| Kyle Farnsworth | 2 | 0 | 5.76 | 39 | 0 | 0 | 29.2 | 37 | 19 | 19 | 7 | 19 |
| Jake Odorizzi | 0 | 1 | 3.94 | 7 | 4 | 1 | 29.2 | 28 | 13 | 13 | 8 | 22 |
| Josh Lueke | 0 | 2 | 5.06 | 19 | 0 | 0 | 21.1 | 23 | 12 | 12 | 12 | 25 |
| Brandon Gomes | 3 | 1 | 6.52 | 26 | 0 | 0 | 19.1 | 18 | 15 | 14 | 7 | 29 |
| Álex Colomé | 1 | 1 | 2.25 | 3 | 3 | 0 | 16.0 | 14 | 8 | 4 | 9 | 12 |
| Wesley Wright | 0 | 0 | 2.92 | 16 | 0 | 0 | 12.1 | 9 | 4 | 4 | 3 | 15 |
| Enny Romero | 0 | 0 | 0.00 | 1 | 1 | 0 | 4.2 | 1 | 0 | 0 | 4 | 0 |
| Jeff Beliveau | 0 | 0 | 0.00 | 1 | 0 | 0 | 0.2 | 1 | 0 | 0 | 1 | 0 |
| Sam Fuld | 0 | 0 | 0.00 | 1 | 0 | 0 | 0.1 | 0 | 0 | 0 | 0 | 0 |
| Team totals | 92 | 71 | 3.74 | 163 | 163 | 42 | 1464.0 | 1315 | 646 | 608 | 482 | 1310 |

== Farm system ==
| Level | Team | League | Manager |
|---|---|---|---|
| AAA | Durham Bulls | International League | Charlie Montoyo |
| AA | Montgomery Biscuits | Southern League | Billy Gardner Jr. |
| A | Charlotte Stone Crabs | Florida State League | Brady Williams |
| A | Bowling Green Hot Rods | Midwest League | Jared Sandberg |
| A-Short Season | Hudson Valley Renegades | New York–Penn League | Mike Johns |
| Rookie | Princeton Rays | Appalachian League | Danny Sheaffer |
| Rookie | GCL Rays | Gulf Coast League | Jim Morrison |

LEAGUE CHAMPIONS: Durham
