= Alex Torres (baseball) =

Venezuelan baseball player (born 1987)

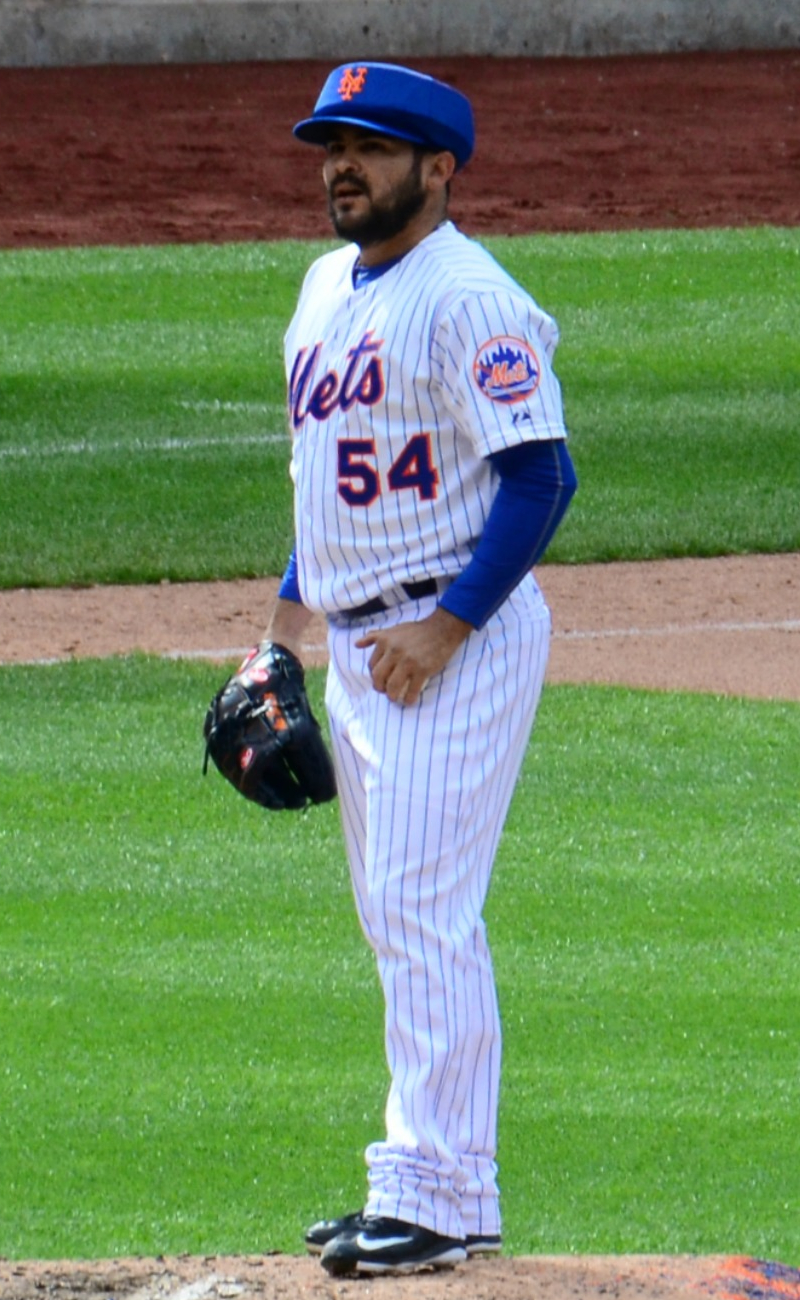
- Torres wearing a protective cap while pitching for the New York Mets in 2015
- Pitcher
- Born: December 8, 1987 (age 38); Valencia, Venezuela
- Batted: Left Threw: Left

MLB debut
- July 18, 2011, for the Tampa Bay Rays

Last MLB appearance
- July 29, 2015, for the New York Mets

MLB statistics
- Win–loss record: 7–4
- Earned run average: 2.68
- Strikeouts: 157
- Stats at Baseball Reference

Teams
- Tampa Bay Rays (2011, 2013); San Diego Padres (2014); New York Mets (2015)

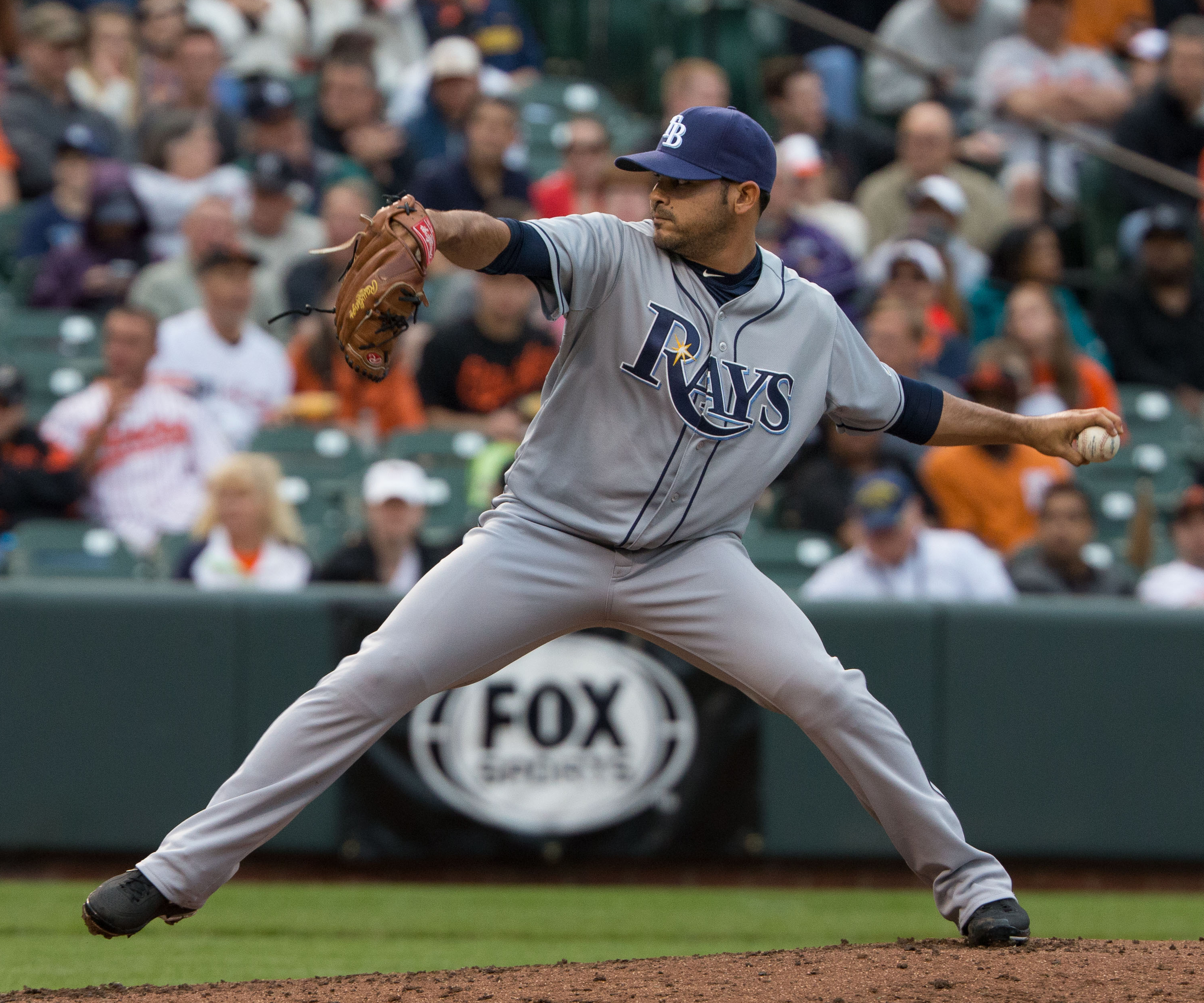
Torres pitching for the Tampa Bay Rays in 2013

Alexander Jesus Torres Matos (born December 8, 1987) is a Venezuelan former professional baseball pitcher. He played in Major League Baseball (MLB) for the Tampa Bay Rays, San Diego Padres and New York Mets. He is known as the first pitcher in Major League Baseball to take advantage of the league rules allowing pitchers to wear protective headgear full-time.

== Professional career ==
=== Los Angeles Angels ===
Torres was signed on January 12, 2005, by Los Angeles Angels scout Carlos Porte, as an international free agent, and was assigned to the Angels' Dominican Summer League Angels that season. He spent the 2006 and 2007 seasons with the Angels' rookie-level Arizona League Angels, as well as the beginning of the 2008 season before earning a promotion to the Rancho Cucamonga Quakes in the Class A-Advanced California League.

In 2009, Torres was again assigned to Rancho Cucamonga, where he earned minor league Pitcher of the Month honors for the Angels organization in both June and July. He held a stretch of 19 consecutive scoreless innings pitched (June 9–29, 2008) and won his final 5 starts before being promoted again to the Arkansas Travelers in the Double-A Texas League on July 31, 2009.

=== Tampa Bay Rays ===
On August 28, 2009, Torres was traded to the Tampa Bay Rays along with infielders Sean Rodriguez and Matthew Sweeney for pitcher Scott Kazmir, and he was assigned to the Montgomery Biscuits in the Double-A Southern League. Following the 2009 season, the Rays added Torres to the 40-man roster on November 19 to protect him from the Rule 5 draft. Torres started 27 games for Montgomery in 2010, posting a 3.47 ERA and 150 strike-outs in 142 2/3 innings.

For the 2011 season, Torres was promoted to the Durham Bulls in the Triple-A International League. He was promoted to the Major League for the first time on July 18, 2011. He pitched in a single game on July 18, giving up one hit and three walks in one inning, before he was returned to Triple-A. He was called up to the Rays again in September, pitching in 3 more games in relief. For the season in Triple-A, he started 27 games, had a 3.08 ERA and 156 strike-outs in 146 1/3 innings.

Torres began 2012 as a starter for the Durham Bulls, but he struggled with control and was sent to the bullpen after 5 starts with a 10.38 ERA. He made 11 relief appearances, allowing 11 earned runs in 20 1/3 innings, and then returned to the starting rotation in mid-June. He continued to struggle in 8 more starts, allowing 24 earned runs in 24 innings, before he was placed on the disabled list and then sent to the rookie-level Gulf Coast League Rays in Port Charlotte, Florida to work with pitching coach Marty DeMerritt. Torres returned to make the final start of the year in Durham, pitching 5 2/3 scoreless innings and striking out 10. He then pitched in the winter leagues in his native Venezuela.

Torres again opened 2013 with the Triple-A Durham Bulls as he was eligible for a fourth option year after being added to the 40-man roster in 2009. He pitched to a 3.52 ERA in 9 starts in Durham in 2013.

Torres was called up the Rays in mid-May when David Price went down with an injury. He appeared in 2 games out of the bullpen, including a scoreless four-inning stint, and was sent back down to Durham. He was recalled on June 1 to add depth to the bullpen. There was discussion in June about turning Torres into a starter, but manager Joe Maddon opted to keep him in the bullpen. Torres remained with the big league club for the remainder of the season, accumulating a 1.71 ERA and 62 strike-outs in 58 innings and 39 games.

=== San Diego Padres ===
On January 22, 2014, the Rays traded Torres and Jesse Hahn to the San Diego Padres for Logan Forsythe, Brad Boxberger, Matt Andriese, Maxx Tissenbaum and Matt Lollis. On June 21, 2014, Torres became the first Major League Baseball pitcher to wear the isoBLOX protective cap introduced early in the year. MLB approved the product in January, nearly a year and a half after pitcher Brandon McCarthy was struck in the head by a line drive and suffered life-threatening brain injuries. Other pitchers with traumatic injuries includes Juan Nicasio, Alex Cobb and Aroldis Chapman, which led MLB to ramp up efforts to better protect pitchers. Torres accumulated a 3.33 ERA over 54 innings in 70 appearances in 2014, striking out 51 and walking 33.

=== New York Mets ===
On March 30, 2015, the Padres traded Torres to the New York Mets for Cory Mazzoni and a player to be named later. Torres pitched to a 3.15 ERA, but walked 26 batters in 34 1/3 and allowed left-handed hitters a .268 batting average against. All of this combined with the fact that Torres was out of minor league options ultimately led the Mets to designate him for assignment on August 4. Torres cleared waivers and was sent outright to the Triple–A Las Vegas 51s on August 8.

=== San Francisco Giants ===
On January 7, 2016, Torres signed a minor league contract with the Atlanta Braves. On April 1, he was released.

On April 15, 2016, Torres signed a minor league contract with the San Francisco Giants organization. He made 40 appearances for the Triple–A Sacramento River Cats, compiling a 4.26 ERA with 38 strikeouts across 38 innings pitched. Torres elected free agency following the season on November 7.

=== Gunma Diamond Pegasus ===
Torres signed with the Gunma Diamond Pegasus of the Baseball Challenge League for the 2017 season.

=== Tigres de Quintana Roo ===
On January 15, 2020, Torres signed with the Tigres de Quintana Roo of the Mexican League. He did not play in a game due to the cancellation of the Mexican League season because of the COVID-19 pandemic. Torres was released by Quintana Roo on April 6.

== See also ==
- List of Major League Baseball players from Venezuela
