= 2013 American League Division Series =

Teams
Team (Wins)		Manager	Season
Boston Red Sox (3)		John Farrell	97–65 (.599), GA: 5 1/2
Tampa Bay Rays (1)		Joe Maddon	92–71 (.564), GB: 5 1/2
- Dates: October 4–8
- Television: TBS
- TV announcers: Brian Anderson, John Smoltz, Joe Simpson and Rachel Nichols
- Radio: ESPN
- Radio announcers: Jon Sciambi and Chris Singleton
- Umpires: Dana DeMuth (crew chief), Eric Cooper, Paul Emmel, Chris Guccione, Larry Vanover, Mike Winters

Teams
Team (Wins)		Manager	Season
Detroit Tigers (3)		Jim Leyland	93–69 (.574), GA: 1
Oakland Athletics (2)		Bob Melvin	96–66 (.593), GA: 5 1/2
- Dates: October 4–10
- Television: TBS (Games 1–2, 4–5); MLB Network (Game 3)
- TV announcers: Don Orsillo, Dennis Eckersley, Buck Martinez and David Aldridge (TBS); Matt Vasgersian, Jim Kaat and Sam Ryan (MLBN)
- Radio: ESPN
- Radio announcers: Michael Kay and Aaron Boone
- Umpires: Gary Darling (crew chief), C. B. Bucknor, Mike DiMuro, Tom Hallion, Jim Reynolds, Mark Wegner
- ALWC: Tampa Bay Rays defeated Cleveland Indians, 4–0

The 2013 American League Division Series were two best-of-five playoff series in Major League Baseball’s (MLB) 2013 postseason to determine the teams that would participate in the 2013 American League Championship Series. The three divisional winners (seeded 1-3 based on record) and a fourth team — the winner of a one-game Wild Card playoff — played in two series. TBS carried most of the games, with some on MLB Network.

These matchups were:

- (1) Boston Red Sox (AL East champions) vs. (5) Tampa Bay Rays (Wild Card Game winner): Red Sox won the series, 3–1.
- (2) Oakland Athletics (AL West champions) vs. (3) Detroit Tigers (AL Central champions): Tigers won the series, 3–2.

The higher seeded team in each series hosted Games 1, 2, and 5 (if necessary), and the lower seeded team hosted Games 3 and 4 (if necessary).

This was the 2nd time the Rays and Red Sox have faced each other in the postseason. The only other time was the 2008 ALCS which was won by the Rays 4 games to 3.

This was the 4th time the Tigers and the A's have faced each other in the postseason. The Tigers and the A's faced each other in the 1972 ALCS (A's won 3–2), in the 2006 ALCS (Tigers won 4–0) and in the 2012 ALDS (Tigers won 3–2).

The Red Sox went on to defeat the Tigers in the ALCS, then win the 2013 World Series over the National League champion St. Louis Cardinals.

== Matchups ==
=== Boston Red Sox vs. Tampa Bay Rays ===
Boston won the series, 3–1.

Game	Date	Score	Location	Time	Attendance
1	October 4	Tampa Bay Rays – 2, Boston Red Sox – 12	Fenway Park	3:33	38,177
2	October 5	Tampa Bay Rays – 4, Boston Red Sox – 7	Fenway Park	3:14	38,705
3	October 7	Boston Red Sox – 4, Tampa Bay Rays – 5	Tropicana Field	4:19	33,675
4	October 8	Boston Red Sox – 3, Tampa Bay Rays – 1	Tropicana Field	3:49	32,807

=== Oakland Athletics vs. Detroit Tigers ===
Detroit won the series, 3–2.

Game	Date	Score	Location	Time	Attendance
1	October 4	Detroit Tigers – 3, Oakland Athletics – 2	O.co Coliseum	3:24	48,401
2	October 5	Detroit Tigers – 0, Oakland Athletics – 1	O.co Coliseum	3:23	48,292
3	October 7	Oakland Athletics – 6, Detroit Tigers – 3	Comerica Park	3:32	43,973
4	October 8	Oakland Athletics – 6, Detroit Tigers – 8	Comerica Park	3:25	43,958
5	October 10	Detroit Tigers – 3, Oakland Athletics – 0	O.co Coliseum	3:20	46,959

== Boston vs. Tampa Bay ==
=== Game 1 ===
October 4, 2013 3:07 pm (EDT) at Fenway Park in Boston, Massachusetts 63 °F (17 °C), cloudy
Team	1	2	3	4	5	6	7	8	9	R	H	E
Tampa Bay	0	1	0	1	0	0	0	0	0	2	4	0
Boston	0	0	0	5	3	0	0	4	X	12	14	0
WP: Jon Lester (1–0) LP: Matt Moore (0–1); Home runs: TB: Sean Rodriguez (1), Ben Zobrist (1); BOS: None; Attendance: 38,177; Boxscore

In Game 1, Jon Lester of the Red Sox pitched 7 2/3 innings, allowing home runs to Sean Rodriguez in the second and Ben Zobrist in the fourth. The only other hit he allowed was a one-out single to Delmon Young in the fourth. Trailing 2–0, the Red Sox' offense ignited in the bottom of the fourth inning off Matt Moore. After a leadoff single and ground-rule double. Jonny Gomes tied the game with a one-out double to center field. One out later, Stephen Drew's single and Will Middlebrooks's double scored a run each. After Jacoby Ellsbury reached on a strike-three wild pitch, Shane Victorino capped the inning's scoring with an RBI single that put the Red Sox up 5–2. Next inning, after a one-out double and intentional walk, Jarrod Saltalamacchia's two-run double made it 7–2 Red Sox and knock Moore out of the game. Wesley Wright relieved Moore and after a strikeout and intentional walk, Ellsbury's RBI single made it 8–2 Red Sox. In the eighth, Ellsbury hit a leadoff single off Jamey Wright, stole second and scored on Victorino's single. A single and walk loaded the bases before Mike Napoli walked to force in a run, Gomes hit into a double play to score another, and Saltalamacchia's RBI single capped the game's scoring at 12–2 Red Sox. Junichi Tazawa and Ryan Dempster provided effective relief pitching in the eighth and ninth to seal the Game 1 victory for the Red Sox.

=== Game 2 ===
October 5, 2013 5:37 pm (EDT) at Fenway Park in Boston, Massachusetts 63 °F (17 °C), mostly cloudy
Team	1	2	3	4	5	6	7	8	9	R	H	E
Tampa Bay	0	1	0	0	2	1	0	0	0	4	8	2
Boston	2	0	2	1	1	0	0	1	X	7	11	0
WP: John Lackey (1–0) LP: David Price (0–1) Sv: Koji Uehara (1); Home runs: TB: None; BOS: David Ortiz 2 (2); Attendance: 38,705; Boxscore

Game 2 featured a match up between David Price, and John Lackey. In the first inning, Jacoby Ellsbury hit a blooper-single before stealing second and moving to third on a missed throw-out attempt. Dustin Pedroia got the sac-fly to bring him home. Ortiz, who had never hit a home run off Price, hit a home run into the bullpen to give the Red Sox an early 2–0 lead. The next inning, Tampa's Delmon Young hit a sacrifice fly of his own with two on to make it 2–1. In the third, back-to-back leadoff doubles by David Ross and Ellsbury made it 3–1 Red Sox. After a Shane Victorino single, Dustin Pedroia's RBI groundout made it 4–1 Red Sox. Next inning, Mike Napoli drew a leadoff walk and scored on Stephen Drew's two-out triple to make it 5–1 Red Sox. In the fifth, James Loney hit a two-run double to cut the lead to 5–3. In the bottom of the fifth, a Pedroia line drive double scored Ellsbury from first, who singled to lead off, to make it 6–3. In the sixth, Desmond Jennings hit a leadoff single, moved to second on a groundout and scored on Yunel Escobar's single to make it 6–4. In the bottom eighth David Ortiz hit a deep solo homer off Price to make it 7–4. Koji Uehara pitched a perfect ninth for a save. Lackey allowed four runs while coming through in clutch situations to keep the Sox in the lead throughout the game. According to Joe Maddon after the game, Price did not pitch badly even though he gave up seven earned runs. During Price's post-game interview, he claimed it was a lucky win for the Sox.

=== Game 3 ===
October 7, 2013 6:07 pm (EDT) at Tropicana Field in St. Petersburg, Florida 73 °F (23 °C), dome
Team	1	2	3	4	5	6	7	8	9	R	H	E
Boston	1	0	0	0	2	0	0	0	1	4	7	0
Tampa Bay	0	0	0	0	3	0	0	1	1	5	11	1
WP: Fernando Rodney (1–0) LP: Koji Uehara (0–1); Home runs: BOS: None; TB: Evan Longoria (1), José Lobatón (1); Attendance: 33,675; Boxscore

Dustin Pedroia started Game 3 with an RBI groundout off Alex Cobb in the first which scored Jacoby Ellsbury after a single and hit-by-pitch. In the top of the fifth, an Ellsbury double and Shane Victorino single was followed by a wild pitch and RBI single by David Ortiz. In the bottom of the fifth, Evan Longoria hit a three-run home run off Clay Buchholz to tie the game at three. The Rays took the lead in the eighth on Delmon Young's bases loaded groundout off Brandon Workman, the run charged to Franklin Morales, but the Red Sox tied the game in the ninth on Pedroia's groundout with runners on second and third off Fernando Rodney. Tampa Bay's José Lobatón hit a home run with two outs in the bottom of the ninth inning off Koji Uehara into the Rays Touch Tank to beat the Red Sox 5–4 and keep the series alive. This was the Rays first postseason win at home since Game 2 of the 2008 World Series

=== Game 4 ===
October 8, 2013 8:37 pm (EDT) at Tropicana Field in St. Petersburg, Florida 73 °F (23 °C), dome
Team	1	2	3	4	5	6	7	8	9	R	H	E
Boston	0	0	0	0	0	0	2	0	1	3	6	0
Tampa Bay	0	0	0	0	0	1	0	0	0	1	6	0
WP: Craig Breslow (1–0) LP: Jake McGee (0–1) Sv: Koji Uehara (2); Attendance: 32,807; Boxscore

Craig Breslow came out of the bullpen to send the Red Sox into the AL championship series for the first time in five years. Breslow relieved Red Sox starter Jake Peavy in the sixth inning and struck out his first four batters. The Rays struck first off of Peavy when Yunel Escobar hit a leadoff double in the sixth, moved to third on a groundout, and scored on David DeJesus's single, but in the seventh, the Red Sox got runners on first and third with two outs off of Jake McGee, who was relieved by Joel Peralta. A wild pitch to Shane Victorino scored a run before Victorino singled to score another. The Red Sox loaded the bases off of Fernando Rodney on two walks and a hit-by-pitch before Dustin Pedroia's sacrifice fly gave them an insurance run. Koji Uehara pitched a perfect bottom half for the save and with the series win, the Red Sox improved to 6–4 all-time in ALDS play; the Rays fell to 1–3.

=== Composite line score ===
2013 ALDS (3–1): Boston Red Sox over Tampa Bay Rays

Team	1	2	3	4	5	6	7	8	9	R	H	E
Tampa Bay Rays	0	2	0	1	5	2	0	1	1	12	29	3
Boston Red Sox	3	0	2	6	6	0	2	5	2	26	38	0
Total attendance: 143,364 Average attendance: 35,841

== Oakland vs. Detroit ==
=== Game 1 ===
October 4, 2013 6:37 pm (PDT) at O.Co Coliseum in Oakland, California, 77 °F (25 °C), clear
Team	1	2	3	4	5	6	7	8	9	R	H	E
Detroit	3	0	0	0	0	0	0	0	0	3	10	0
Oakland	0	0	0	0	0	0	2	0	0	2	3	1
WP: Max Scherzer (1–0) LP: Bartolo Colón (0–1) Sv: Joaquín Benoit (1); Home runs: DET: None; OAK: Yoenis Céspedes (1); Attendance: 48,401; Boxscore

Bartolo Colón surrendered three runs in the first inning. After a double by Austin Jackson, Colon hit Torii Hunter with a pitch and Miguel Cabrera followed with an RBI single that sent Hunter to third. Prince Fielder grounded into a double play, with Hunter scoring on the play. After a Victor Martínez double, Alex Avila grounded a seeing-eye single to right, which gave Detroit an early 3–0 lead. Max Scherzer struck out 11 and gave up one hit through the first six innings. In the bottom of the seventh, Yoenis Céspedes hit a two-run home run to trim the Tigers lead to 3–2. Joaquín Benoit got Josh Donaldson to pop out to first to end the eighth inning, and he then struck out the side in the ninth to close out the win. A's hitters fanned 16 times off three Tigers pitchers.

=== Game 2 ===
October 5, 2013 6:07 pm (PDT) at O.Co Coliseum in Oakland, California, 82 °F (28 °C), clear
Team	1	2	3	4	5	6	7	8	9	R	H	E
Detroit	0	0	0	0	0	0	0	0	0	0	4	0
Oakland	0	0	0	0	0	0	0	0	1	1	8	0
WP: Grant Balfour (1–0) LP: Al Alburquerque (0–1); Attendance: 48,292; Boxscore

Game 2 was a fierce pitching duel between both teams. Oakland Athletics rookie starter Sonny Gray matched Detroit Tigers veteran Justin Verlander with eight shutout innings and nine strikeouts. Verlander was dominant as well, with seven shutout innings and 11 strikeouts. Both teams' bullpens carried the game scoreless into the bottom of the ninth. A's leadoff batter Yoenis Céspedes started the inning with a ground ball single into left field. Seth Smith followed up with a ground ball single into right field, moving Céspedes over to third base. Tigers reliever Al Alburquerque then intentionally walked Josh Reddick to load the bases. With no outs in the bottom of the ninth, Alburquerque was lifted for Rick Porcello. A's catcher Stephen Vogt greeted Porcello with a line-drive single to left field, driving in Céspedes for the walk off win and tying the series at one game apiece.

=== Game 3 ===
October 7, 2013 1:07 pm (EDT) at Comerica Park In Detroit, Michigan 53 °F (12 °C), cloudy
Team	1	2	3	4	5	6	7	8	9	R	H	E
Oakland	0	0	1	2	3	0	0	0	0	6	10	0
Detroit	0	0	0	3	0	0	0	0	0	3	7	1
WP: Jarrod Parker (1–0) LP: Aníbal Sánchez (0–1) Sv: Grant Balfour (1); Home runs: OAK: Josh Reddick (1), Brandon Moss (1), Seth Smith (1); DET: None; Attendance: 43,973; Boxscore

The A's scored six runs (five earned) off 2013 AL ERA leader Aníbal Sánchez. The first run was unearned, when Yoenis Céspedes hit a sharp grounder to third that Miguel Cabrera mishandled for an error, allowing Coco Crisp to score from second. In the top of the fourth, Josh Reddick led off with a home run. Stephen Vogt followed with a triple, and scored on a sacrifice fly by Crisp, making the score 3–0. The Tigers tied the game off Jarrod Parker in the bottom of the fourth, on an RBI double by Victor Martínez and a two-run single by Jhonny Peralta. This ended a streak of 20 consecutive scoreless innings by A's pitchers. The A's quickly went back on top by three runs in the fifth, on a homer from Brandon Moss and a two-run shot by Seth Smith. In the bottom of the ninth inning, A's pitcher Grant Balfour got into a heated argument with Detroit batter Víctor Martínez. The argument included a profane exchange between Martinez and Balfour, caught by MLB Network's on-field microphones, and caused the benches to empty. No injuries were reported and no ejections were made because of the incident, and Balfour went on to earn the save. Because MLB Network is a cable channel not under FCC purview, no action could be taken against them, though the game announcers apologized for the profanity shortly after.

=== Game 4 ===
October 8, 2013 5:08 pm (EDT) at Comerica Park In Detroit, Michigan 67 °F (19 °C), sunny
Team	1	2	3	4	5	6	7	8	9	R	H	E
Oakland	1	0	0	0	2	0	1	0	2	6	12	0
Detroit	0	0	0	0	3	0	2	3	X	8	9	0
WP: Max Scherzer (2–0) LP: Sean Doolittle (0–1); Home runs: OAK: Jed Lowrie (1); DET: Jhonny Peralta (1), Víctor Martínez (1); Attendance: 43,958; Boxscore

The A's took another early lead on the Tigers, when Coco Crisp led off the game with a triple off Doug Fister and scored on a Jed Lowrie single. The A's extended the lead to 3–0 in the top of the fifth, when Lowrie hit a two-run homer to right field. It looked like the Tiger hitters, who had struggled to put up runs all series long, were on their way to another frustrating evening when starter Dan Straily no-hit them through the first four innings. But Prince Fielder led off the bottom of the fifth with a bloop single to left, Victor Martínez grounded a single to right, and Jhonny Peralta followed with a three-run homer to left to tie the game. Tiger manager Jim Leyland went to Game 1 starter Max Scherzer as a reliever in the top of the seventh, and Oakland promptly went up 4–3 when Coco Crisp drove in Stephen Vogt with a single. On a controversial play, the Tigers managed to tie the game in the bottom of the inning, when Victor Martínez hit the ball to the right-center field wall and a fan reached into the field of play and disrupted its trajectory. The call on the field was a home run for Martínez. Umpires reviewed the play because the fan had clearly interfered with the path of the ball, but they let the home run stand after concluding that there was not enough video evidence to determine if right fielder Josh Reddick would have made a leaping catch. Later in the inning, Austin Jackson gave the Tigers a 5–4 lead on a broken-bat RBI single that scored pinch runner Andy Dirks. Scherzer nearly gave the lead back when he loaded the bases with no outs in the top of the eighth, but he struck out Reddick and Vogt before getting pinch hitter Alberto Callaspo on a line out to center. The Tigers got three additional runs in the bottom of the inning, when pinch runner Hernán Pérez scored on a bases-loaded wild pitch by Brett Anderson, and Omar Infante followed with a two-run double to make the score 8–4. The A's made it interesting in the top of the ninth, getting the tying run to the plate after a two-run single by Yoenis Céspedes, but Joaquín Benoit struck out Seth Smith to prevent any further damage.

=== Game 5 ===
October 10, 2013 5:08 pm (PDT) at O.Co Coliseum in Oakland, California 63 °F (17 °C), sunny
Team	1	2	3	4	5	6	7	8	9	R	H	E
Detroit	0	0	0	2	0	1	0	0	0	3	8	0
Oakland	0	0	0	0	0	0	0	0	0	0	3	0
WP: Justin Verlander (1–0) LP: Sonny Gray (0–1) Sv: Joaquín Benoit (2); Home runs: DET: Miguel Cabrera (1); OAK: None; Attendance: 46,959; Boxscore

Having used Max Scherzer in relief during Game 4, Jim Leyland sent Game 2 starter Justin Verlander to the hill. A's manager Bob Melvin also chose to go with his Game 2 starter, Sonny Gray, who had befuddled the Tigers for eight shutout innings earlier in the series. Gray looked solid again, surrendering only a walk through the first three innings. Torii Hunter got the Tigers' first hit in the fourth, a one-out single up the middle, then Gray made a mistake on an inside fastball to Miguel Cabrera that the slugger hit for a two-run homer to left. It was Cabrera's first extra-base hit of the series and only his second home run since August. The Tigers got a third run with one out in the sixth inning. With runners on first and third, Omar Infante hit a potential inning-ending double play ball to third off reliever Dan Otero, but Josh Donaldson bounced his throw to second baseman Alberto Callaspo. Callaspo corralled the ball for a force out but had no chance to get Infante at first, and Victor Martínez scored on the play. Verlander, who threw a four-hit shutout in Game 5 of the 2012 ALDS, also in Oakland, was brilliant again. He retired the first 16 Oakland batters before giving up a one-out walk to Josh Reddick in the sixth inning. He lost his no-hit bid with two outs in the seventh, when Yoenis Céspedes hit a hard single to center, but escaped the inning with no damage. Verlander would leave after eight shutout innings, surrendering two hits and one walk, while striking out ten. Closer Joaquín Benoit surrendered a two-out double to Jed Lowrie and hit Céspedes with a pitch to bring the tying run to the plate for the second straight game. But he got Seth Smith to fly out to short right field, ending the game and the series.

Verlander's effort gave him 30 straight scoreless innings against the A's in the playoffs, breaking the record for scoreless innings against one team in the postseason set by Christy Mathewson (28). The A's also struck out 57 times in the series, breaking the old record for a best-of-five playoff series of 55 strikeouts set by the 2010 Tampa Bay Rays. Both Austin Jackson of the Tigers and Brandon Moss of the A's fanned 13 times in the series, setting an ALDS record for an individual player.

The Tigers made it to the ALCS for the third straight season, becoming the first team to do so since the 1998–2001 New York Yankees made four straight appearances. The Athletics have now lost their last six winner-take-all Game 5s, the last two at the hands of the Tigers (2012 and 2013). They are now 1–12 in playoff-clinching games since 2000, the only win coming in 2006 when they swept the Minnesota Twins in the ALDS.

=== Composite line score ===
2013 ALDS (3–2): Detroit Tigers over Oakland Athletics

Team	1	2	3	4	5	6	7	8	9	R	H	E
Detroit Tigers	3	0	0	5	3	1	2	3	0	17	38	1
Oakland Athletics	1	0	1	2	5	0	3	0	3	15	36	1
Total attendance: 231,583 Average attendance: 46,316

== See also ==
- 2013 National League Division Series
