= 2013 American League Wild Card Game =

Baseball game

	1	2	3	4	5	6	7	8	9	R	H	E
Tampa Bay Rays	0	0	1	2	0	0	0	0	1	4	8	0
Cleveland Indians	0	0	0	0	0	0	0	0	0	0	9	1
- Date: October 2, 2013
- Venue: Progressive Field
- City: Cleveland, Ohio
- Managers: Joe Maddon (Tampa Bay Rays); Terry Francona (Cleveland Indians)
- Umpires: Gerry Davis (crew chief), Ted Barrett, Mike Everitt, Greg Gibson, Phil Cuzzi, Brian Knight
- Attendance: 43,579
- Ceremonial first pitch: Andre Thornton
- Television: TBS
- TV announcers: Brian Anderson, Joe Simpson, John Smoltz, and Rachel Nichols
- Radio: ESPN
- Radio announcers: Jon Sciambi and Chris Singleton

The 2013 American League Wild Card Game was a play-in game during Major League Baseball's (MLB) 2013 postseason played between the American League's (AL) two wild card teams, the Cleveland Indians and the Tampa Bay Rays (the latter winners of a one-game tie-breaker against the Texas Rangers). It was held at Progressive Field in Cleveland, Ohio, on October 2, 2013. The Rays won by a 4–0 score and advanced to the AL Division Series to face the Boston Red Sox, who went on to become the World Series champion of that year. The game was televised on TBS.

== Game results ==
=== Line score ===
October 2, 2013 8:07 pm (EDT) at Progressive Field in Cleveland, Ohio, 69 °F (21 °C), clear
Team	1	2	3	4	5	6	7	8	9	R	H	E
Tampa Bay	0	0	1	2	0	0	0	0	1	4	8	0
Cleveland	0	0	0	0	0	0	0	0	0	0	9	1
WP: Alex Cobb (1–0) LP: Danny Salazar (0–1); Home runs: TB: Delmon Young (1); CLE: None; Attendance: 43,579; Boxscore

Rays starting pitcher Alex Cobb recorded 6 2/3 shutout innings and five strikeouts and three relievers pitched 2 1/3 shutout innings. Delmon Young led off the top of the third inning with a home run and Desmond Jennings hit a two-run double in the fourth off of Danny Salazar. Yunel Escobar had an RBI single in the ninth off of Joe Smith, the run charged to Cody Allen. Rays manager Joe Maddon and Indians manager Terry Francona would meet each other again three years later in the 2016 World Series, with Maddon, as manager of the Chicago Cubs, winning 4–3. The Indians also became the first team in MLB history to be eliminated from the postseason without scoring a run.
