= Alex Cobb =

American baseball player (born 1987)

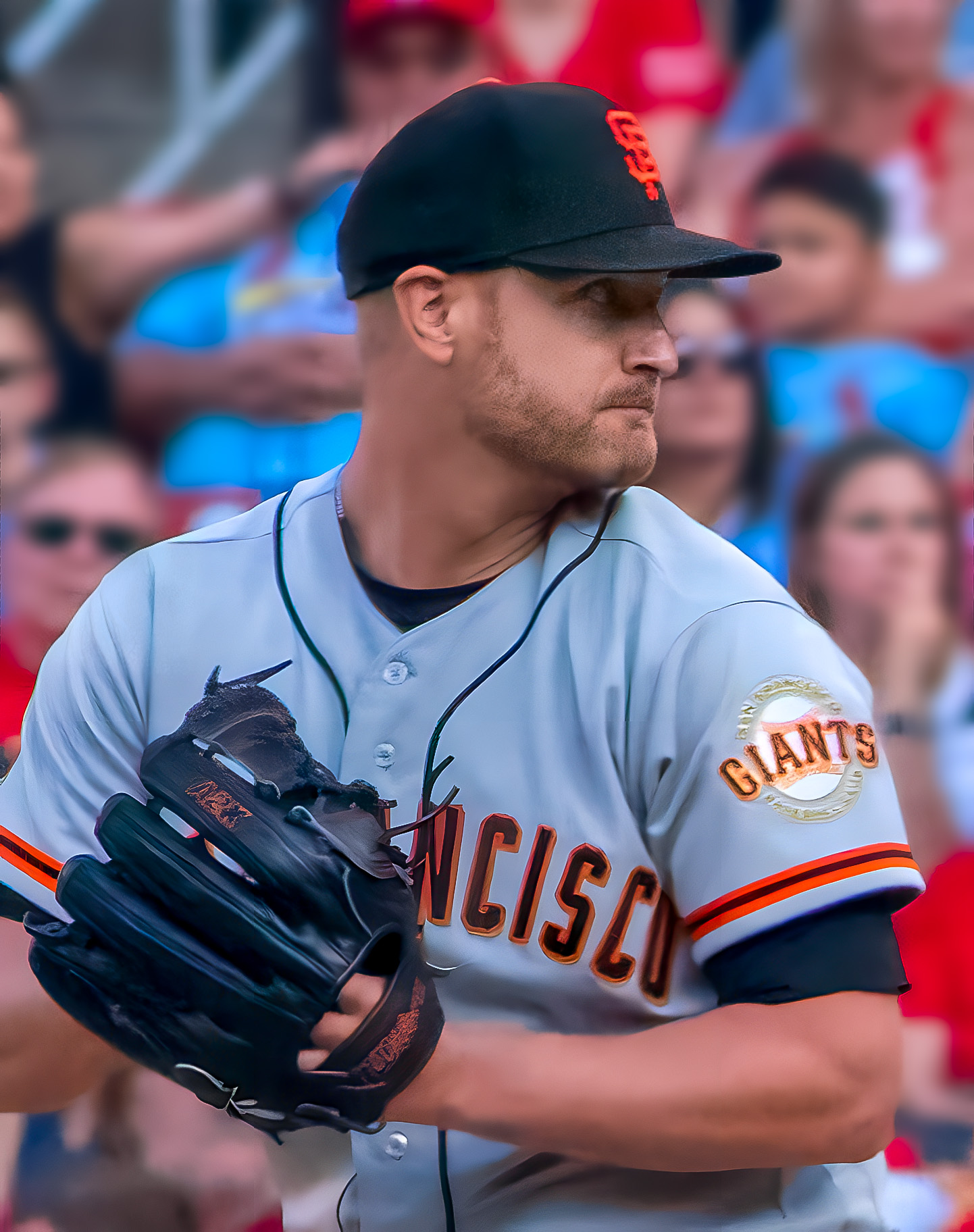
- Cobb with the San Francisco Giants in 2023

Free agent
- Pitcher
- Born: October 7, 1987 (age 39); Boston, Massachusetts, U.S.
- Bats: Right Throws: Right

MLB debut
- May 1, 2011, for the Tampa Bay Rays

MLB statistics (through 2024 season)
- Win–loss record: 79–76
- Earned run average: 3.84
- Strikeouts: 1,108
- Stats at Baseball Reference

Teams
- Tampa Bay Rays (2011–2014, 2016–2017); Baltimore Orioles (2018–2020); Los Angeles Angels (2021); San Francisco Giants (2022–2023); Cleveland Guardians (2024)

Career highlights and awards
- All-Star (2023)

Alexander Miller Cobb (born October 7, 1987) is an American professional baseball pitcher who is a free agent. He has previously played in Major League Baseball (MLB) for the Tampa Bay Rays, Baltimore Orioles, Los Angeles Angels, San Francisco Giants and Cleveland Guardians. Cobb was selected by the Rays in the fourth round of the 2006 MLB draft, and made his MLB debut with them in 2011.

== Early life ==
Cobb was born in Boston, Massachusetts, to Lindsay Miller-Cobb and Rick Cobb, an accountant. He lived in North Reading, Massachusetts, for the first two years of his life, after which his family relocated to Vero Beach, Florida, due to employment. As a youth, Cobb served as a batboy for the Los Angeles Dodgers at Holman Stadium in Vero Beach for three years of spring training. He grew up a Boston Red Sox fan.

Cobb graduated from Vero Beach High School in 2006. While there, he was an all-state pitcher as a junior as he had a 8–2 win–loss record with an 0.62 earned run average (ERA) and 139 strikeouts in 90 innings pitched. As a senior, he was named the Scripps Treasure Coast Newspapers All-Area Baseball Player of the Year after going 5–3 with a 1.06 ERA and 139 strikeouts in 74 innings, and batting .342 with five home runs and 17 runs batted in (RBIs). He also played quarterback for the football team. Cobb committed to play college baseball at Clemson University.

== Professional career ==
=== Tampa Bay Rays ===
==== Draft and minor leagues (2006–2010) ====
The Tampa Bay Rays selected Cobb in the fourth round of the 2006 Major League Baseball draft, and he signed for a $400,000 signing bonus. He played in their farm system from 2006 to 2010. In 2006 with Princeton he was 0–0 with a 5.19 ERA in 8.2 innings. In 2007 with Hudson Valley he was 5–6 with a 3.54 ERA in 81.1 innings. In 2008 with Columbus, he was 9–7 with a 3.29 ERA in 139.2 innings, and was a mid-season SAL All Star. In 2009 with Charlotte, he was 8–5 with a 3.03 ERA in 124.2 innings.

In 2010, he pitched the entire season with Double-A Montgomery. He was 7–5 as he pitched in 23 games (22 starts) with a 2.71 ERA (4th in the Southern League and in the Rays organization), had 128 strikeouts (third in the league and tied for 4th in the Rays' system) in 119.2 innings, and as a starter his 9.51 strikeouts/9 innings ratio led the league.

==== Major leagues (2011–2017) ====
Cobb was called up to the majors for the first time on May 1, 2011, and made his major league debut that day. He was optioned back to the minors after the game. On May 31, Cobb was recalled back to the majors. On June 7, he earned his first major league victory. Cobb pitched for 6 1/3 innings and the Rays defeated the Angels 4–1. In late July, Cobb began to experience numbness and swelling in his right arm. After an August 5 start, he required surgery to remove a blood clot and blockage in the area of his first right rib and remove part of one of his ribs. The two surgeries ended his 2011 season. With Tampa Bay in 2011 he was 3–2 with a 3.42 ERA in nine starts covering 52.2 innings.

Cobb was invited to spring training in 2012, but sent to minor league camp to begin the season. He was called up to fill in for the injured Jeff Niemann. On August 23, Cobb pitched his first career complete-game shutout, besting the Oakland Athletics. He ended the season with a 11–9 record and a 4.03 ERA in 23 starts covering 136.1 innings at the major league level.

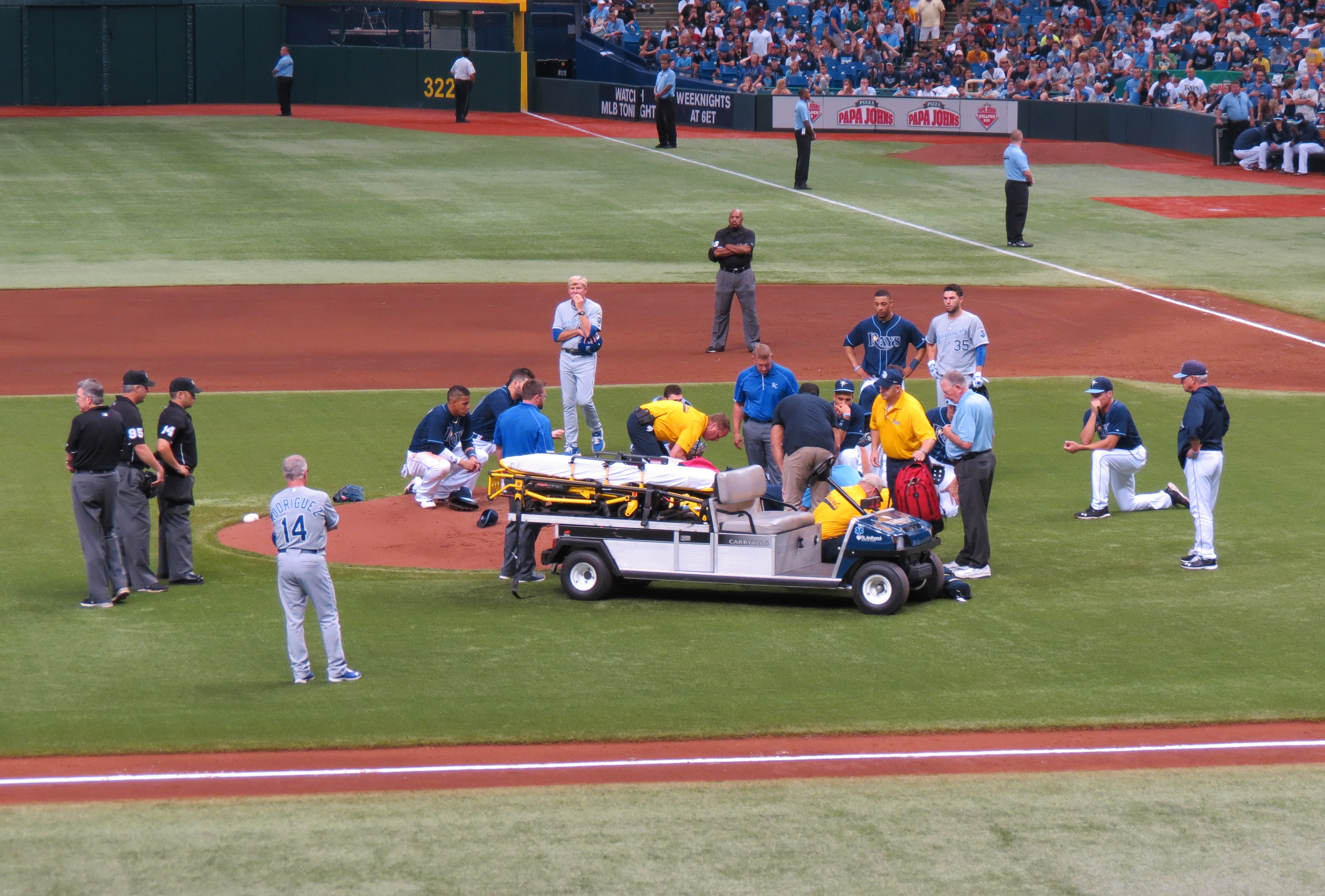
Cobb being lifted onto a stretcher after being struck in the head by a line drive, June 15, 2013.

On May 10, 2013, Cobb struck out four batters in a single inning. He also gave up one run in that inning after Will Venable reached base on a dropped third strike, stole second and third base, and was then balked home for the first time in recorded baseball.

Cobb was struck in the head by a line drive off the bat of Kansas City Royals first baseman Eric Hosmer on June 15, 2013. Cobb was carried off the field on a stretcher and transported to Bayfront Medical Center in St. Petersburg, Florida. It was reported that Cobb suffered a mild concussion and had a cut on his right ear, while all other scans and tests came back normal, and he would be discharged the next day. Cobb suffered nausea, headaches, and vertigo, and missed two months, making his return on August 15.

Cobb was named the American League Player of the Week for the week ending September 22, 2013. In 22 starts in 2013, Cobb finished the year 11–3 with a 2.76 ERA (19.2 innings short of qualifying for the 4th-best ERA in the AL), and a .228 batting average against. His 72.6 ground ball percentage would have ranked highest in the majors had he qualified. His .786 win–loss percentage was the fourth-best in the league among pitchers with 10 or more wins. During the postseason, Cobb started two games, earning a win for the Rays in the American League Wild Card Game over the Cleveland Indians, and starting in Game 3 of the American League Division Series against the Boston Red Sox. Though Cobb pitched well in Game 3, he did not earn the win, leaving with the game tied after five innings. The game was decided when Rays catcher José Lobatón hit a walk-off home run.

In 2014, Cobb endorsed a product designed to help protect young ballplayers from similar injuries: the isoBLOX padded cap insert. The insert, a skull cap which fits underneath adjustable or stretch caps, is based on the same technology Major League Baseball approved for on-field use in 2014. "If boys and girls start wearing protective inserts, it will become second nature for them when they’re older," Cobb said. Cobb went 10–9 with a 2.87 ERA (6th-best in the AL, and 4th-best in team history) in 27 starts. His 7.683 hits per 9 innings were 4th-best in the AL, and his 0.60 home runs per 9 innings were 6th-best. He received the lowest run-support of all AL pitchers, at 3.63 runs per 9 innings.

To begin the 2015 season, Cobb was placed on the 15-day disabled list due to right forearm tendinitis, missing what would have been his first Opening Day start. On May 5, 2015, it was revealed that his elbow was diagnosed with a partial tear of the UCL. Three days later, it was announced that he would undergo Tommy John surgery, ending his 2015 season.

Cobb began the 2016 season on the 60-day disabled list. He returned to the Rays’ rotation towards the end of the season, but was not effective. In five starts covering 22 innings, Cobb was 1–2 and posted an 8.59 ERA. After Cobb returned from Tommy John surgery, he completely changed the usage of his pitches. Due to the health of his arm and his rehabilitation program, Cobb was not allowed to throw his split-finger fastball, his most dominant and often-used pitch. Cobb went back to using his four-seam fastball and an improved, and more commonly used, curveball.

Due to the success of Cobb's first 10 starts of the 2017 season (3.82 ERA) and his impending free-agency, the Rays were reported to be shopping the starter if they were to fall out of the playoff race or if they felt they had the depth to lose Cobb. After an injury to Matt Andriese and poor play by Blake Snell coupled with Cobb's flashes of high potential, the Rays stated that they were not actively shopping Cobb, instead planning on utilizing him as a key piece for the regular season and playoffs. After a poor May and early June, Cobb showed signs of brilliance, constantly pitching late into games, getting weak contact, and consistently keeping his pitch count down. Between June 9 and July 26, Cobb recorded 9 quality starts in 10 games, pitching 7 or more innings in 6 of those games. In that stretch, he went 5–1 and lowered his ERA from 4.52 to 3.46, even flirting with a no-hitter through 7 innings against the Pittsburgh Pirates.

Cobb ended the 2017 season 12–10 with a 3.66 ERA in 177 innings over 29 starts. His whiff percentage was 16.9%, in the bottom 4% in baseball. His 1.41 range factor on defense was the best among AL pitchers. He was named the winner of the Paul C. Smith Champion Award, which goes to the Rays player who best exemplifies the spirit of true professionalism on and off the field.

=== Baltimore Orioles (2018–2020) ===
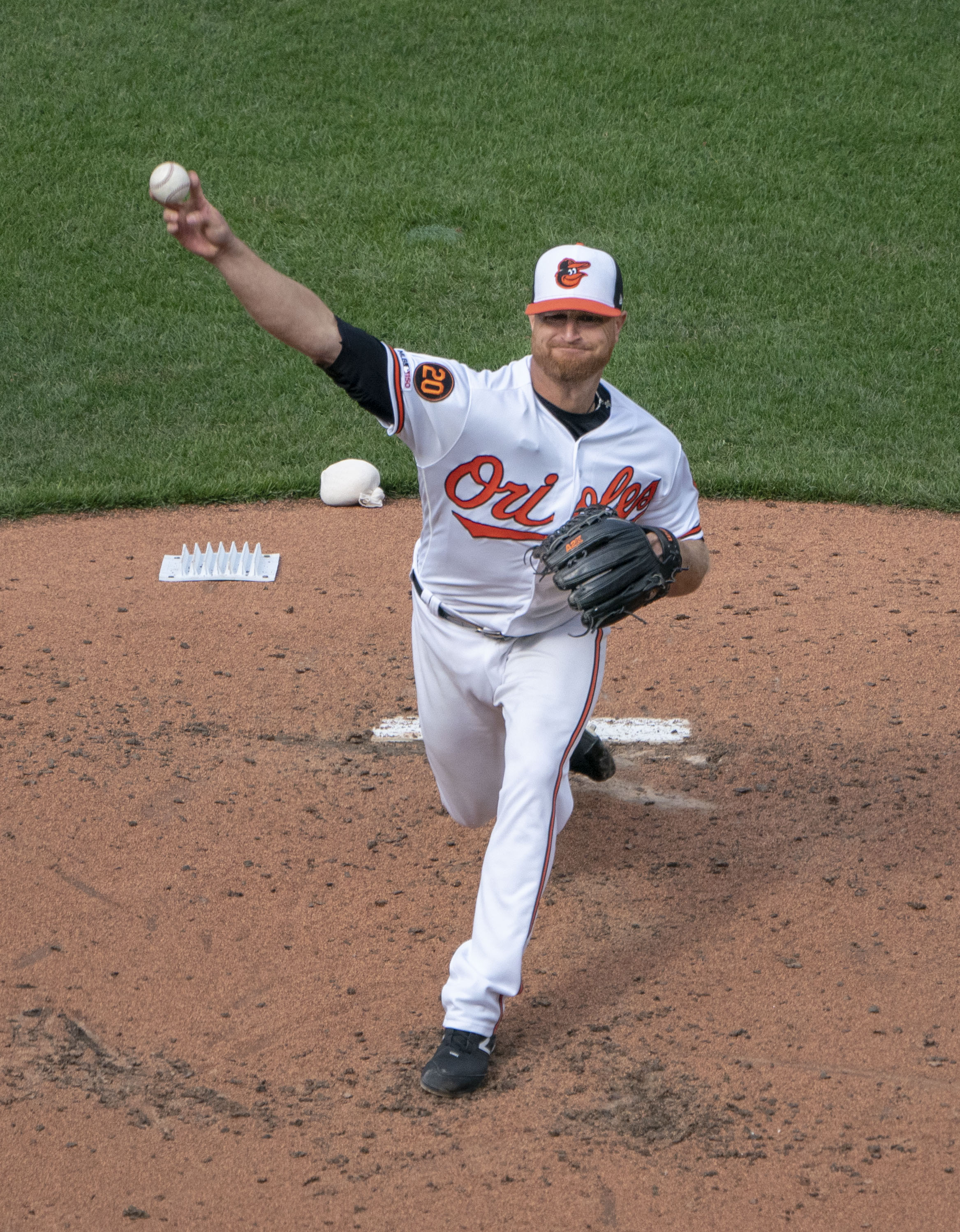
Cobb with the Baltimore Orioles in 2019.

On March 20, 2018, Cobb agreed to a four-year deal worth $57 million with the Baltimore Orioles. On September 23, he aggravated a blister, keeping him out for the remainder of the season.

He finished the first season of his 4-year contract with a 5–15 record in 28 starts with a 4.90 ERA. He struck out 102 batters in 152 1/3 innings.

On March 13, 2019, the team announced that Cobb would be the team's Opening Day starter. A week later, however, he was placed on the 10-day disabled list with a right groin strain to start the season. He was placed on the disabled list for a third time on April 28 with a lumbar strain. At the time of the injury, Cobb had allowed 9 home runs in 12 1/3 innings. He was transferred to the 60-day disabled list on May 22. On June 11, it was revealed Cobb needed to undergo hip surgery, and he was ruled out for the rest of the season.

In 2019, in only 12.1 innings pitched, he was 0–2 with a 10.95 ERA in three starts.

In 2020 for the Orioles, Cobb pitched to a 2–5 record with a 4.30 ERA and 38 strikeouts over 52.1 innings pitched in 10 starts. Batters hit hard-hit balls against him 48.2% of the time, putting him in the worst 4% of baseball pitchers in that category.

=== Los Angeles Angels (2021) ===
On February 2, 2021, Cobb was traded to the Los Angeles Angels in exchange for second baseman Jahmai Jones. The Orioles also agreed to pay over half of the remaining $15 million on Cobb's salary. During the season he had stints on the injured list due to both blisters and right wrist inflammation.

In 2021 he was 8–3 with a 3.76 ERA and 98 strikeouts in 93.1 innings (a career-high 9.5 batters per 9 innings) over 18 starts. He had the third-lowest home runs/9 innings pitched rate among starters with at least 90 innings. He also was in the top 94% among qualified pitchers in "barrel rate," as he gave up a barrel (high exit velocity and ideal launch angle) on only 4.2% of batted balls against him, and in the top 93% on his career-best "chase rate" (the percentage of pitches outside the strike zone that he induces batter to swing at).

=== San Francisco Giants (2022–2024) ===
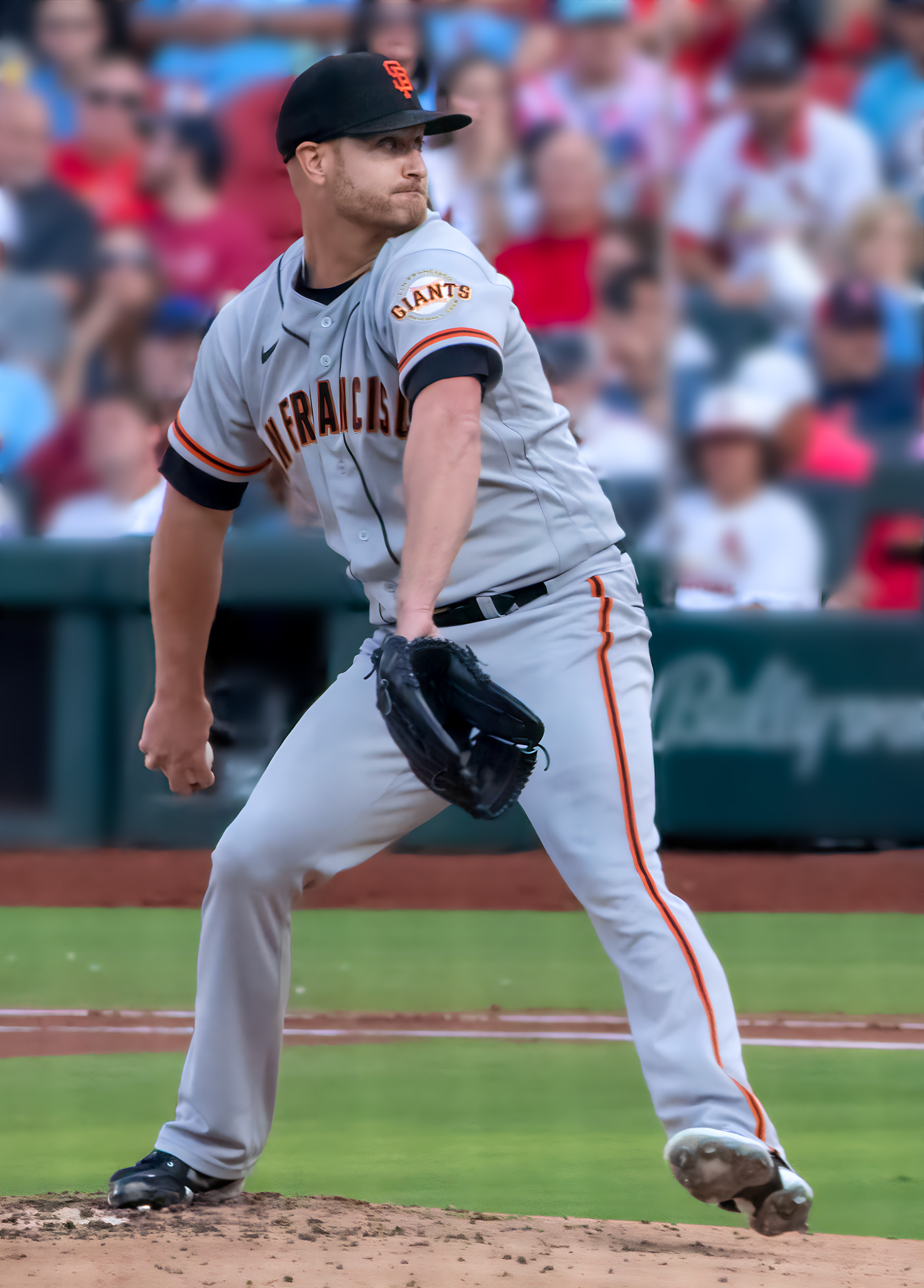
Cobb in 2023

On November 30, 2021, the San Francisco Giants signed Cobb to a two-year, $20 million contract with a $10 million club option for his third season.

In 2022 with the Giants, he was 7–8 with a 3.73 ERA in 23 starts, as in 149.2 innings he struck out 151 batters (a career high). He was in the top 4% in "lowest barrel-rate against," among MLB pitchers. His 3.51 strikeouts/walk ratio was the best of his career, and he used his splitter 42.5% of the time which was the highest splitter usage among starters in MLB. On defense he led all NL pitchers in double plays turned, with four.

On August 29, 2023, Cobb took a no-hitter bid into the ninth inning in a game against the Cincinnati Reds. Spencer Steer broke up the bid with two outs with an RBI double (scoring a runner who had walked earlier in the inning). Cobb finished off the complete game victory as the Giants defeated the Reds 6–1. Along with the walk and double in the ninth, the Reds' only other baserunner came on a third inning error; seven of Cobb's nine innings were perfect. He threw 131 pitches, tied for the most for a starter since 2018. Cobb made 28 starts for San Francisco in 2023, with a 7–7 record, 3.87 ERA, and 131 strikeouts across 151 1/3 innings pitched. Following the season on October 30, it was announced that Cobb would undergo left hip surgery to address his labrum and ongoing impingements. On November 5, 2023, the Giants exercised their $10 million option on Cobb for the 2024 season.

While beginning the 2024 season rehabilitating from surgery, Cobb began to experience shoulder inflammation in his right arm, and was transferred to the 60-day injured list on April 20, 2024.

=== Cleveland Guardians (2024) ===
On July 30, 2024, Cobb was traded to the Cleveland Guardians for minor league pitcher Jacob Bresnahan and minor league infielder Nate Furman. He was activated from the injured list on August 9. On September 1, Cobb took a perfect game into the seventh inning against the Pittsburgh Pirates before Isiah Kiner-Falefa hit a ground ball which bounced off of Cobb, allowing him to reach base. After making 3 starts during the regular season, Cobb started twice for Cleveland in the postseason, losing Game 3 of the American League Division Series and Game 1 of the American League Championship Series. It was his first postseason action since 2013.

=== Detroit Tigers (2025) ===
On December 10, 2024, the Detroit Tigers signed Cobb to a one-year, $15 million contract. He suffered a right hip injury before the season began, and was later transferred to the 60-day injured list on May 30, 2025. On September 6, it was announced that Cobb would undergo season-ending resurfacing surgery on his right hip.

== Pitching style ==
Cobb throws four pitches: a sinker (his most-used pitch in 2021) and a four-seam fastball, each averaging about 93 mph, a splitter in the high 80s (his second-most used pitch in 2021), and a knuckle curve in the low 80s. Nearly half of his pitches with 2 strikes in 2021 were splitters.

== Personal life ==
Cobb proposed to his girlfriend, Kelly Reynolds, in February 2014 at the Discovery Cove in Orlando. They have been married since 2016 and have two daughters together, born in March 2019 and July 2020.

Cobb's brother, R.J., is a United States Army officer who served in Iraq and Afghanistan and was awarded a Purple Heart. R.J. is four years older than Alex. Their mother, a nurse practitioner, died in December 2005 at 49 years of age as the result of a stroke, when he was a senior in high school.

== See also ==
- List of Major League Baseball single-inning strikeout leaders
