= Sean Rodriguez =

American baseball player (born 1985)

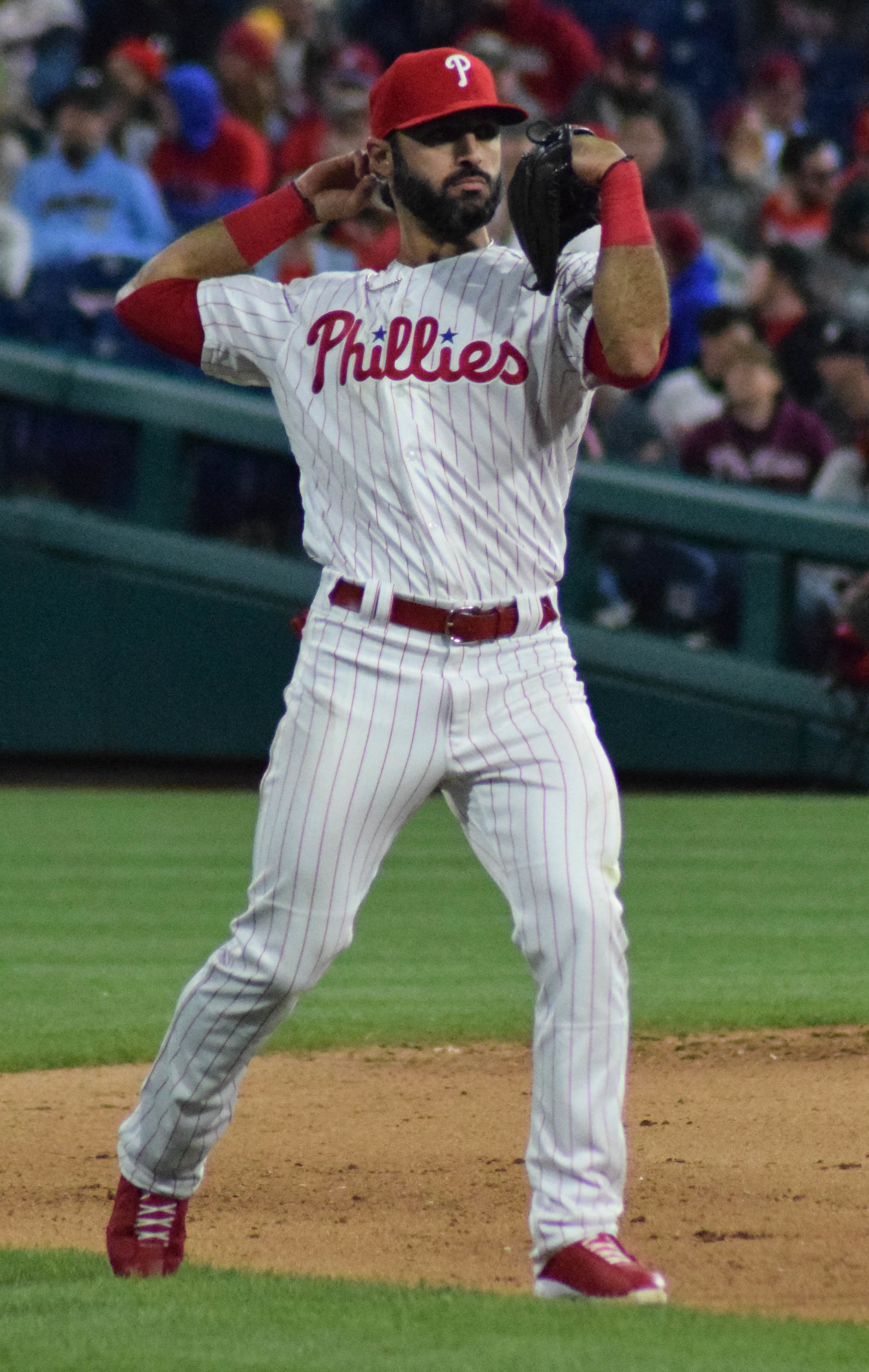
- Rodriguez with the Philadelphia Phillies in 2019
- Utility player
- Born: April 26, 1985 (age 41); Miami, Florida, U.S.
- Batted: Right Threw: Right

MLB debut
- April 19, 2008, for the Los Angeles Angels

Last MLB appearance
- September 19, 2020, for the Miami Marlins

MLB statistics
- Batting average: .226
- Home runs: 81
- Runs batted in: 298
- Stats at Baseball Reference

Teams
- Los Angeles Angels (2008–2009); Tampa Bay Rays (2010–2014); Pittsburgh Pirates (2015–2016); Atlanta Braves (2017); Pittsburgh Pirates (2017–2018); Philadelphia Phillies (2019); Miami Marlins (2020)

Sean John Rodriguez (born April 26, 1985) is an American former professional baseball utility player who currently serves as a player development instructor for the Philadelphia Phillies of Major League Baseball (MLB). He played in MLB for the Los Angeles Angels, Tampa Bay Rays, Pittsburgh Pirates, Atlanta Braves, Phillies, and Miami Marlins. Rodriguez was drafted out of high school by the Angels in the third round of the 2003 Major League Baseball draft. He made his major league debut in 2008. While he played more second base than any other position, Rodriguez played at every position in his MLB career except for catcher.

== Early life ==
Rodriguez was born in Miami, Florida, to Cuban parents. His father, Johnny, was largely responsible for teaching his son the game of baseball. By the age of four, Sean was using a 30-inch (760 mm) bat, weighted with a baseball doughnut. At age eight, he could throw baseballs from the outfield to home plate. Johnny also coached Sean in Little League. Though Sean wanted to play shortstop at the time, his father placed him in the outfield. His father spent the 2014 season as Manager of the Rookie-level Johnson City Cardinals of the Appalachian League, and has coached, managed, and scouted in eight organizations. Sean's older brother, Robert, was a catcher in the Nationals’ minor league system for five years (2002–06), and is the head coach/instructor at Total Baseball Academy in Clearwater, Florida.

Rodriguez attended Miami Coral Park High School where he played center field for the baseball team. He transferred after his sophomore year to G. Holmes Braddock High School, where Rodriguez played shortstop for the baseball team.

== Professional career ==
=== Los Angeles Angels of Anaheim ===
Rodriguez was drafted out of high school by the Anaheim Angels in the third round (90th overall) of the 2003 Major League Baseball draft. He signed for a $400,000 signing bonus. Rodriguez, then primarily a shortstop, began his professional career for the Rookie League Tempe Angels in 2003. In 54 games, he batted .269/.332/.380 with 2 home runs, 25 RBIs, and 11 stolen bases in 216 at bats.

Rodriguez split the 2004 season between the Rookie League Provo Angels, for whom he batted .338/.486/.569 and scored 64 runs (tied for 2nd in the Pioneer League) with four triples (tied for 4th) and 55 RBIs and 51 walks (both tied for 5th), and the Single-A Cedar Rapids Kernels. In a combined 421 at bats in 121 games, he batted .297/.420/.487 with 14 home runs, 72 RBIs, and 23 stolen bases. Rodriguez was named a Pioneer League postseason All-Star, and was the Pioneer League MVP.

Rodriguez spent the entire 2005 season playing for the Kernels. He played in 124 games with 448 at bats and batted .250/.371/.422 with 14 home runs, 45 RBIs, and 27 stolen bases.

In 2006, he split the year between the Single-A Rancho Cucamonga Quakes with whom he batted .301/.377/.545 and was 2nd in the California League with 24 home runs, the Double-A Arkansas Travelers, and the Triple-A Salt Lake Bees (just one game for them). On June 18 Rodriguez was the California League Player of the Week. In a combined 135 games, he batted .307 with 29 home runs. His 135 games were a career high for him, and so were his .307/.387/.557 batting average, 29 home runs, 77 RBIs 522 at-bats, and 34 doubles. He also led the Quakes with 24 home runs, a .299 batting average, and was tied for first in doubles with 29. Rodriguez was also named a California League midseason and postseason All-Star, and after the minor league season, was named by Baseball America and Topps as a High Class A All-Star.

In 2007, Rodriguez played for the Travelers again, this time for an entire season. In a career-high 136 games, he batted .254/.345/.423 with 84 runs (tied for 3rd in the Texas League), 31 doubles (tied for 9th), 17 home runs (tied for 10th), and 73 RBIs (8th) while leading the league with 19 HBP. He led the Travelers with his 136 games played, and came in second with 129 hits. Rodriguez was also a Texas League midseason and postseason All-Star.

On November 6, 2007, Rodriguez's contract was purchased by the Angels, protecting him from the Rule 5 draft.

Rodriguez began the 2008 season for the Triple-A Salt Lake Bees. On April 18, he was recalled from the Bees and made his major league debut against the Seattle Mariners the next day. He went 1–4 in his debut. On July 14 he was the Pacific Coast League Player of the Week. For the Bees, he batted .306/.397/.645 with 21 home runs, 52 RBIs, and 9 HBP (tied for 5th) in 248 at bats. For the 2008 season in the major leagues, he batted .204/.276/.317 with three home runs, 10 RBIs, and three stolen bases in 167 at bats.

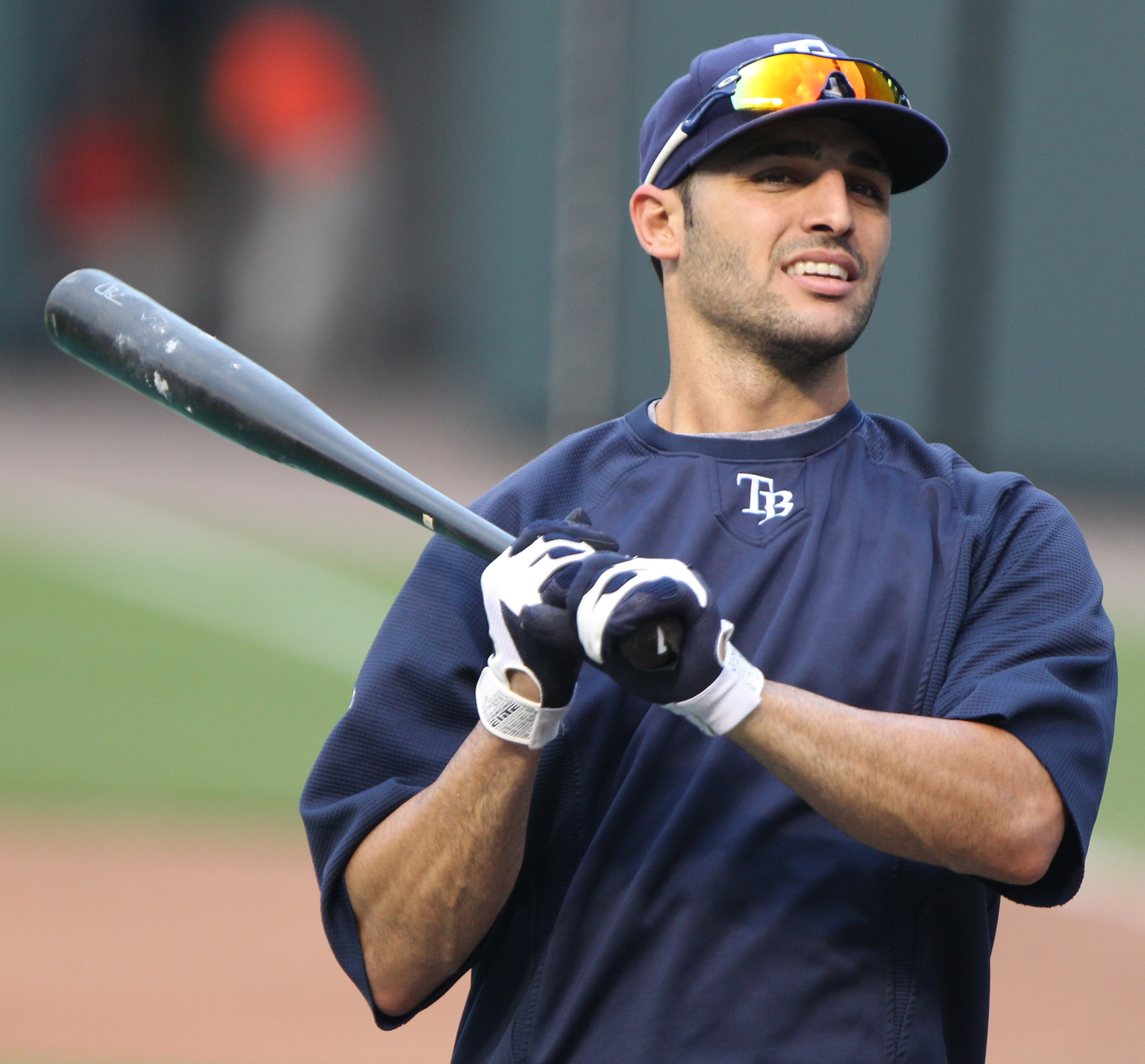
Rodriguez with the Tampa Bay Rays in 2009

On August 17, 2009, he was the Pacific Coast League Player of the Week. In 2009 Rodriguez played most of the season for the Bees, for whom he hit .299/.400/.616 with 81 runs (tied for 9th in the Pacific Coast League), 29 home runs (2nd), 93 RBIs (4th), 9 steals, and 13 HBP (2nd) in 365 at bats. For the 2009 season in the major leagues, he had five hits including two home runs in 25 at bats.

=== Tampa Bay Rays ===
On September 1, 2009, he was traded to the Tampa Bay Rays as the player to be named in a deal that sent Scott Kazmir to the Angels. Fellow minor leaguers Matt Sweeney and Alexander Torres also came to the Rays in the trade. Rodriguez was assigned to the AAA Durham Bulls, where he finished out the season.

Rodriguez's final 2009 stats between Salt Lake City and Durham included him batting .294/.397/.608 (3rd among all minor leaguers), with 30 home runs (tied for 7th among all minor leaguers, and first in the Angels organization) and 98 RBIs (first in the Angels organization) in 385 at-bats. In the Pacific Coast League he was 2nd in home runs (29), 4th in RBIs (93), 5th in OBP (.400), 2nd in slugging percentage (.616), and 2nd in at bats per home run ratio (12.59). On September 23 Rodriguez helped Durham win the Triple-A championship, hitting a solo homer in a 5–4 win over the Memphis Redbirds.

In 2010, he played for the Rays, as their part-time second baseman and utility player. In 343 at bats, Rodriguez hit .251/.308/.397 with 9 home runs, 40 RBIs in 343 at bats. He stole 13 bases on the year, while being caught stealing three times.

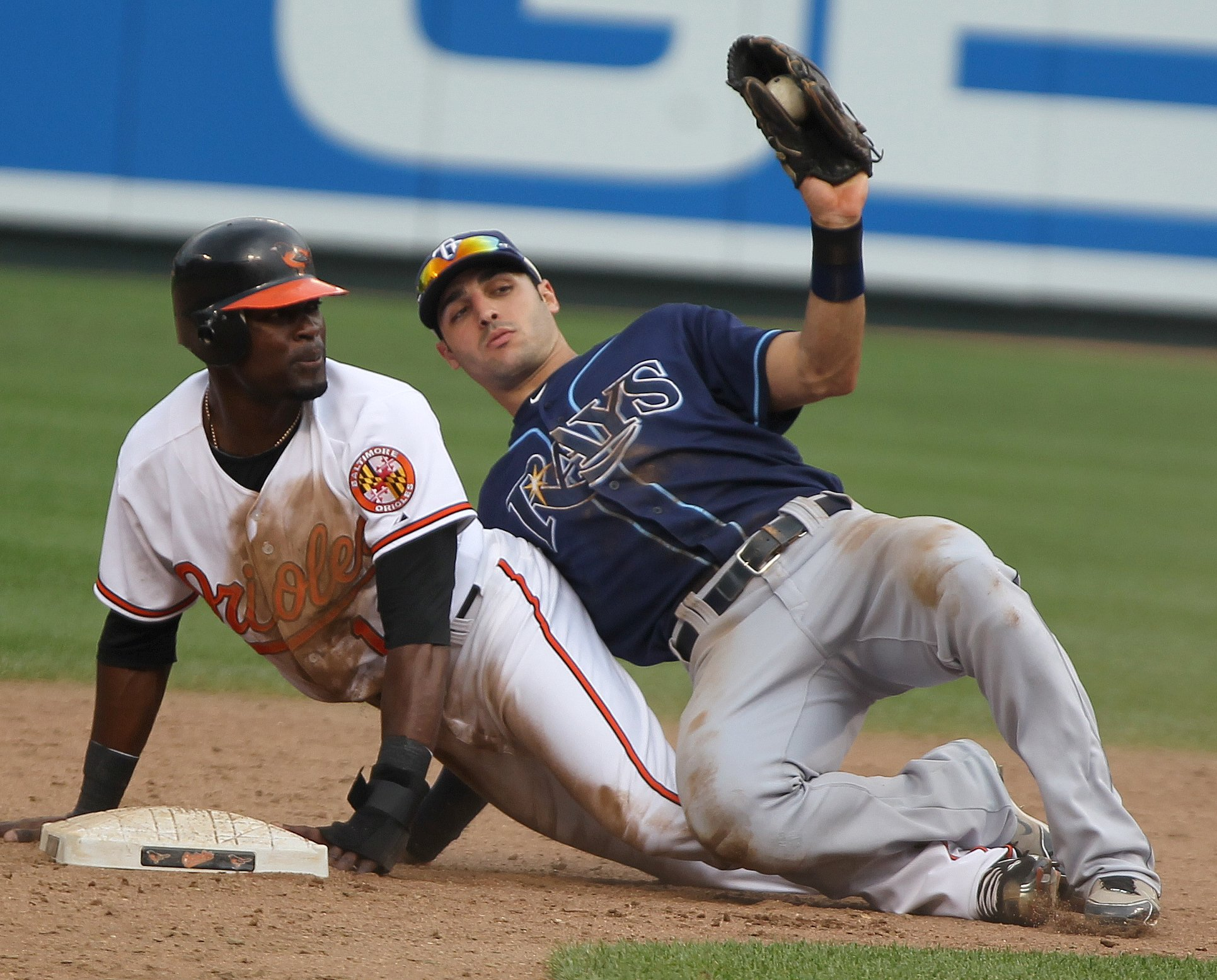
Rodriguez (on the right) in 2011.

During the 2011 season, Rodriguez played 131 games. He batted 223/.323/.357, with 8 home runs, 36 RBIs, 11 stolen bases, and 18 HBP (2nd in the American League) in 373 at bats.

During a game vs the Seattle Mariners on August 15, 2012, Rodriguez struck out looking for the final out in Félix Hernández's perfect game. On August 21, Rodriguez was optioned to Triple-A after the team activated Luke Scott from the disabled list. For the 2012 season, in the major leagues he batted .213/.281/.326 with 6 home runs, 32 RBIs, and 5 stolen bases in 301 at bats.

In 2013, he batted .246/.320/.385 with five home runs and 23 RBIs in 195 at bats for the Rays.

Despite hitting a career-low .211 in 237 at bats over 96 games for the Rays in 2014, Rodriguez had a career-high .443 slugging percentage and set career highs in home runs (12) and RBIs (41). He averaged one RBI for every 5.78 at bats, the 10th-best ratio in the American League among players with at least 250 plate appearances. He was designated for assignment on November 26, when the Rays signed Ernesto Frieri.

=== Pittsburgh Pirates ===
On December 1, 2014, Rodriguez was traded to the Pittsburgh Pirates in exchange for a player to be named later. Pirates minor league right handed pitcher Buddy Borden was the player to be named later, as he was sent to the Tampa Bay Rays to complete the trade for Rodriguez. In 2015 he batted .246/.281/.362 with 4 home runs and 17 RBIs in 224 at bats.

On October 7, 2015, Rodriguez was ejected from the NL Wild Card game for his role in a benches-clearing brawl after Chicago Cubs pitcher Jake Arrieta was intentionally hit by a pitch from Pirates relief pitcher Tony Watson. Earlier in the game, Francisco Cervelli along with Josh Harrison were hit by Arrieta.

On December 17, 2015, Rodriguez re-signed with the Pirates on a one-year, $2.5 million contract. For the week of September 12–18, 2016, Rodriguez was named the National League's Co-Player of the Week, after Rodriguez batted .414 (12-for-29), with six runs scored, five home runs, 12 RBIs, and a 1.386 OPS. In 2016 he batted .270/.349/.510 with career-high 18 home runs and 56 RBIs in 300 at bats.

=== Atlanta Braves ===
On November 30, 2016, Rodriguez signed a two-year, $11.5 million contract with the Atlanta Braves. The expectation was that he would receive more playing time than he would have had with the Pirates.

On the afternoon of January 28, 2017, Rodriguez was injured near his Miami home when his Chevy Suburban SUV was struck in a side collision by a stolen police cruiser. The stolen police car then burst into and was engulfed in flames, as its driver was killed in the crash. In the collision Rodriguez's rotator cuff on his non-throwing left arm was severely torn, his labrum was damaged, and his biceps tendon was dislocated. His wife suffered a broken tibia, femur, wrist, and three broken ribs and was unable to walk for four months, his 7-year-old son Gogo had lacerations on his head, a fractured orbital bone beneath his eye, and a broken arm, and his 2-year-old son Zekiel was hospitalized with internal bleeding.

Rodriguez had surgery on his three injuries on February 14. He missed five months in rehab, and was not activated until mid-season. After Rodriguez returned to the team and had 37 at bats, the Braves traded him.

=== Pittsburgh Pirates (second stint) ===
The Braves traded Rodriguez to the Pittsburgh Pirates on August 5, 2017, in exchange for Connor Joe. In his first game back with the Pirates, he hit a walk-off home run. Between the two major league teams, in 2017 he batted .167/.276/.295 with five home runs and eight RBI in 132 at-bats.

In 2018 for the Pirates, Rodriguez batted .167/.277/.313 with five home runs and 19 RBI in 150 at-bats.

=== Philadelphia Phillies ===
On February 8, 2019, Rodriguez signed a minor league contract with the Philadelphia Phillies. He was invited to spring training with the Phillies. On April 24, Rodriguez was promoted to the major leagues after Jean Segura and Scott Kingery were injured. On June 16, Rodriguez made his first career pitching appearance in the 8th inning against the Atlanta Braves.

In 2019 with the Triple–A Lehigh Valley IronPigs of the International League, Rodriguez slashed .267/.327/.622 with four home runs and 12 RBI in 45 at-bats. With the Phillies, he batted .223/.348/.375 with four home runs and 12 RBI in 112 at-bats.

Through 2019, in the major leagues Rodriguez had played 338 games at second base, 213 games at first base, 187 games at shortstop, 154 games at third base, 125 games in left field, 69 games in right field, 27 games in center field, as well as pitched 1 1/3 scoreless innings in two games.

=== Miami Marlins ===
On February 4, 2020, Rodriguez signed a minor league deal with the Miami Marlins. On July 24, Rodriguez was selected to the 40-man roster, but hit the injured list shortly thereafter due to an unspecified medical reason. On September 20, Rodriguez was designated for assignment by the Marlins after recording 2 hits in 13 at-bats across four games.

== Post-playing career ==
On March 11, 2022, Rodriguez was hired as a player development instructor for the Philadelphia Phillies, effectively ending his playing career.

== Personal life ==
Rodriguez and his wife, Giselle, have four children. Rodriguez is heavily involved in autism awareness, as his son Sean Jr. is highly-functioning with autism. Rodriguez is a Christian.
