= José Lobatón =

Venezuelan baseball player (born 1984)

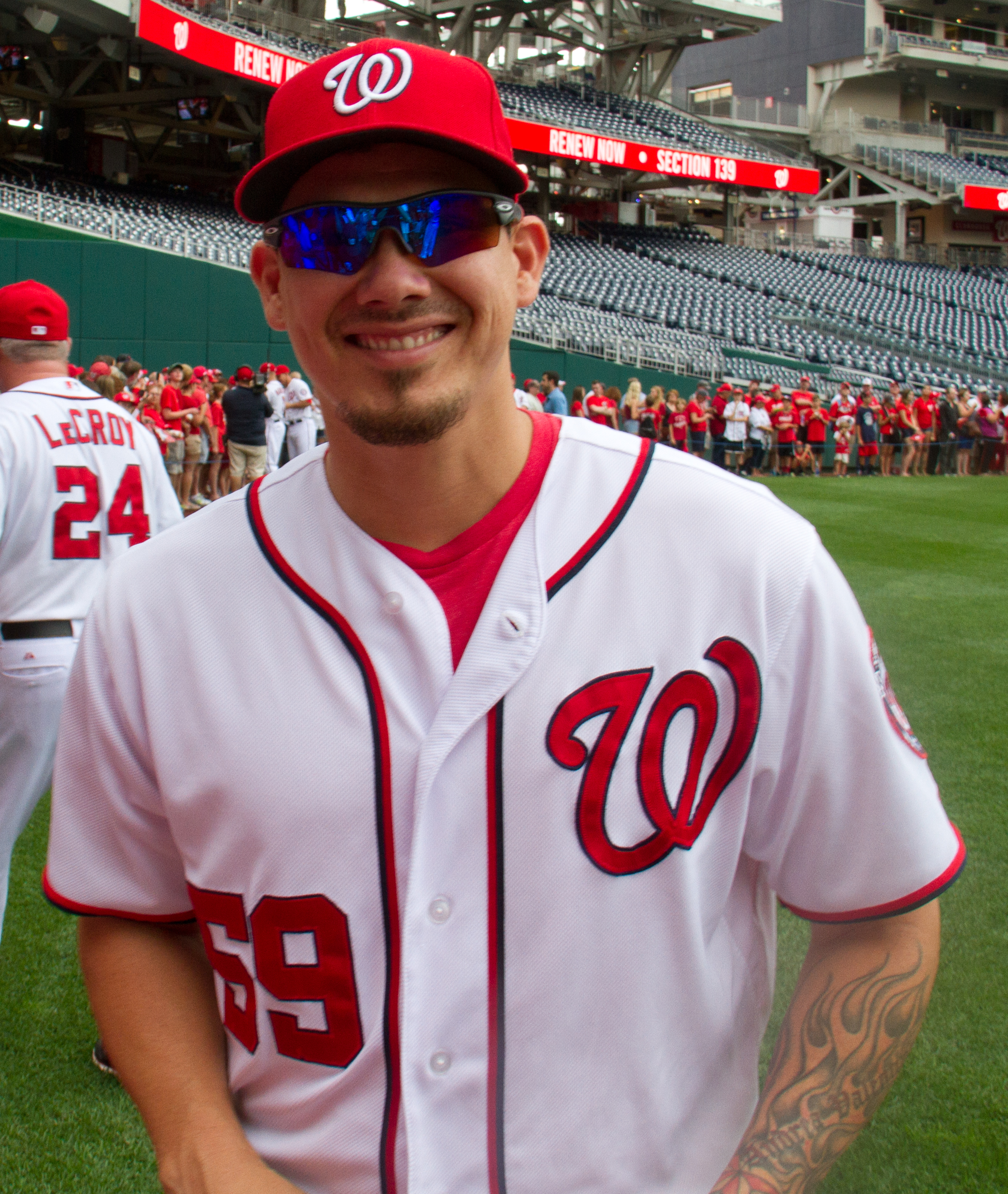
- Lobatón with the Washington Nationals
- Catcher
- Born: October 21, 1984 (age 41); Acarigua, Venezuela
- Batted: Switch Threw: Right

MLB debut
- July 5, 2009, for the San Diego Padres

Last MLB appearance
- June 29, 2021, for the Chicago Cubs

MLB statistics
- Batting average: .213
- Home runs: 21
- Runs batted in: 107
- Stats at Baseball Reference

Teams
- San Diego Padres (2009); Tampa Bay Rays (2011–2013); Washington Nationals (2014–2017); New York Mets (2018); Chicago Cubs (2021)

José Manuel Lobatón (born October 21, 1984) is a Venezuelan former professional baseball catcher. He has played in Major League Baseball (MLB) for the San Diego Padres, Tampa Bay Rays, Washington Nationals, New York Mets, and Chicago Cubs.

== Early life ==
Lobatón was the youngest of four children raised in northeastern Venezuela by their father, a taxi driver, and their stay-at-home mom. In 2002, at 17 years old, he signed with the San Diego Padres for $70,000.

== Career ==
=== San Diego Padres ===
On May 13, 2002, Lobatón signed with the San Diego Padres organization as an international free agent. Lobatón made his professional debut in 2003 with the rookie ball Idaho Falls Padres, slashing .272/.352/.366 in 56 games. The next year, Lobatón played for the Low-A Eugene Emeralds, batting .219/.298/.437 with 7 home runs and 23 RBI. In 2005, he split the season between Eugene, the AZL Padres, and the Single-A Fort Wayne Wizards, accumulating a .250/.368/.313 slash line with 6 RBI between the three teams. In 2006, he split the year between the High-A Lake Elsinore Storm and Fort Wayne, posting a .235/.355/.383 batting line with 5 home runs and 26 RBI. He returned to Lake Elsinore for the 2007 season, and hit .260/.346/.428 paired with career-highs in home runs (10) and RBI (47). In 2008, Lobatón played for the Double-A San Antonio Missions, logging a .259/.338/.422 slash line with 9 home runs and 45 RBI. He was assigned to the Triple-A Portland Beavers to begin the 2009 season.

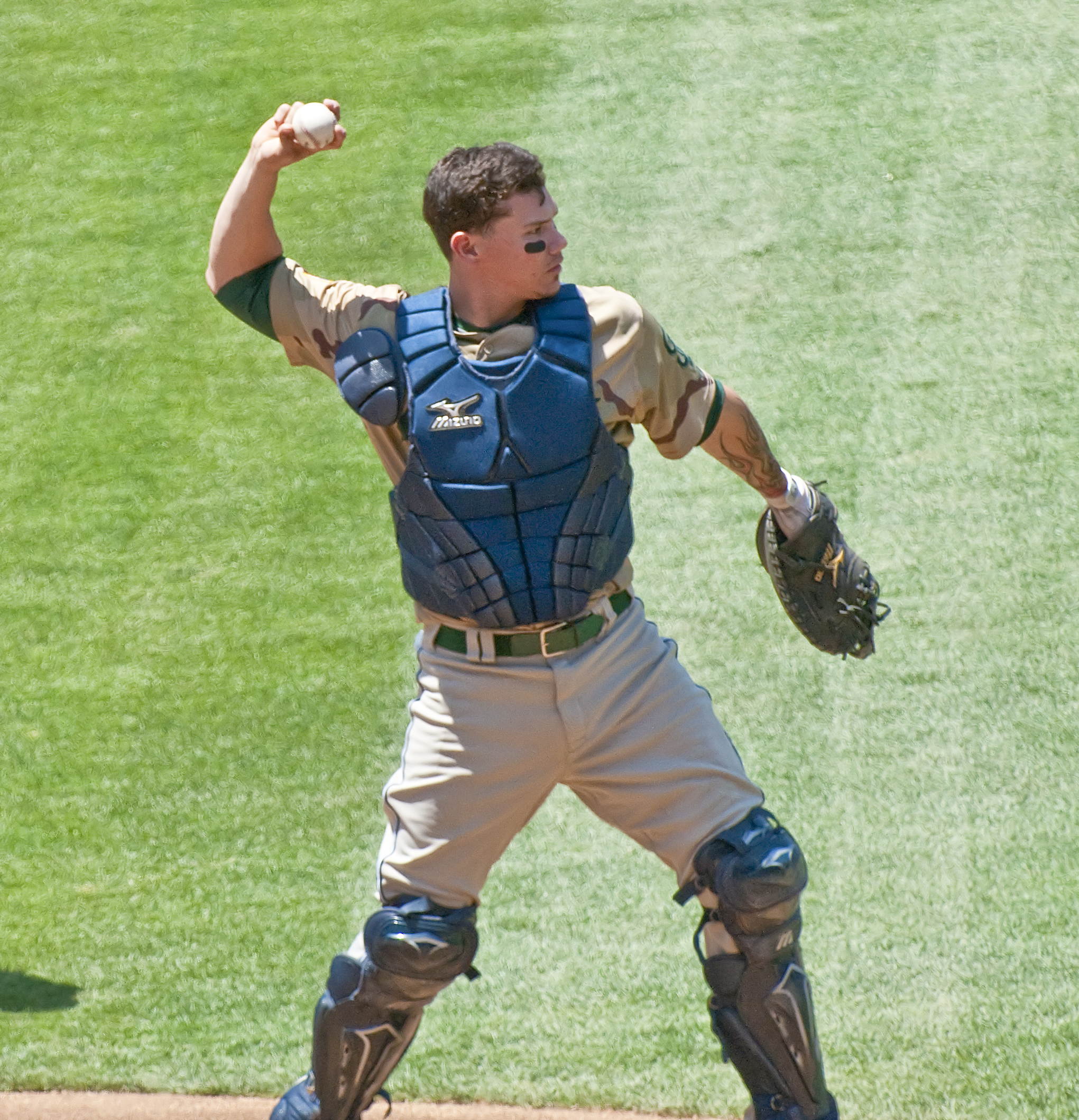
Lobatón with the San Diego Padres in 2009

On July 5, 2009, Lobatón was selected to the 40-man roster and promoted to the major leagues for the first time. He made his Major League debut that day against the Los Angeles Dodgers. He only played in 7 games with the Padres, going .176 in 17 at-bats with 3 hits and no RBI's. He was designated for assignment by the team on July 28.

=== Tampa Bay Rays ===
On July 30, 2009, Lobatón was claimed off waivers by the Tampa Bay Rays and was assigned to the Double A Montgomery Biscuits, where he finished the year batting .262 in 26 games. In 2010, Lobatón spent the entire season split between Montgomery and the Triple-A Durham Bulls, posting a .260/.339/.385 slash line with 7 home runs and 35 RBI. Lobatón spent the majority of the 2011 season split between Durham and the High-A Charlotte Stone Crabs, and also hit .118 with only 4 hits in 34 at-bats for the Rays.

Lobaton hit his first Major League home run against the Baltimore Orioles on July 25, 2012. During a three-game series against the Toronto Blue Jays from August 16–18, 2013, Lobaton hit a walk-off triple and walk-off home run, becoming the first catcher to do so since Wally Schang in 1917 and only the fourth player overall since 2002.

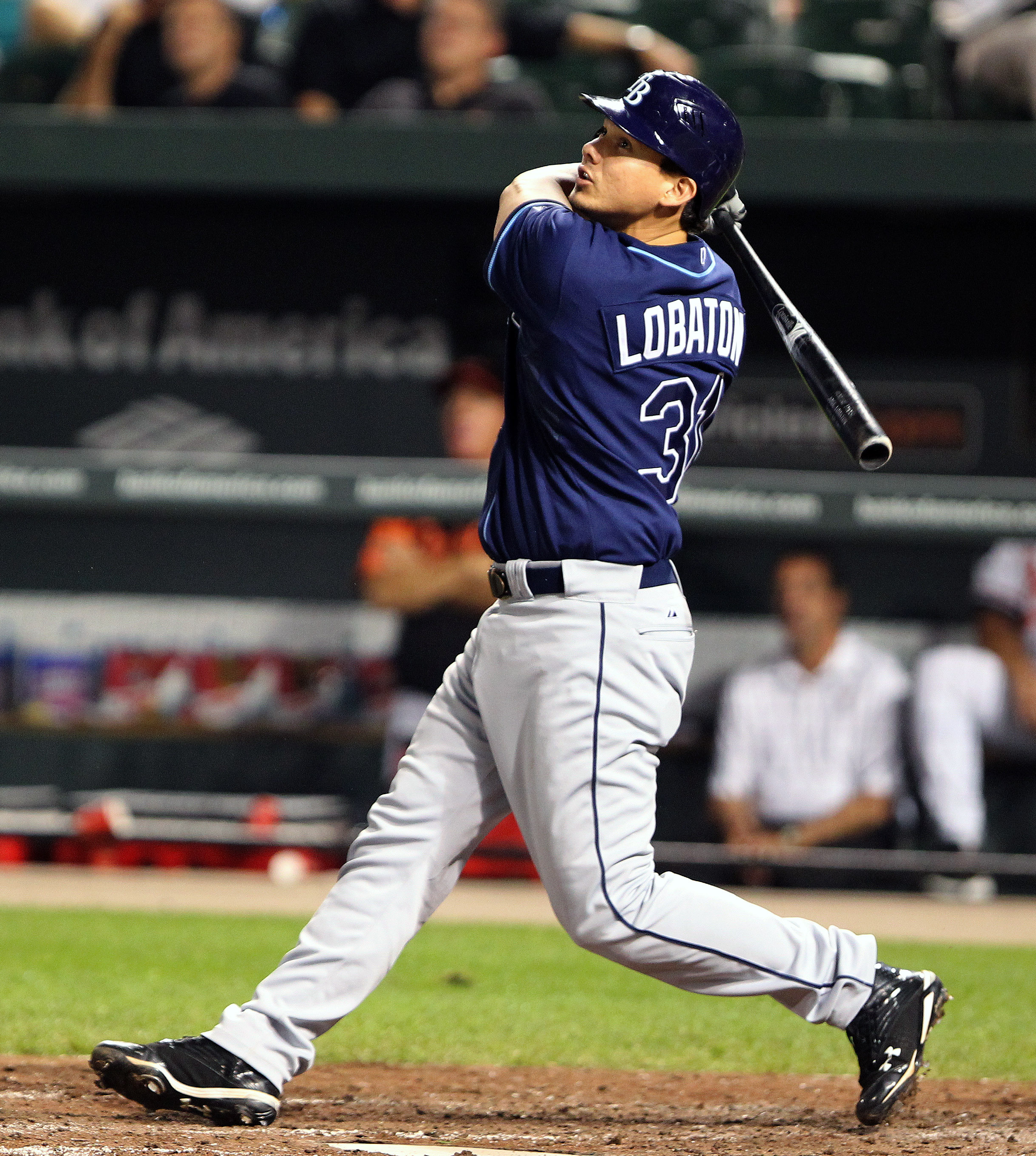
Lobatón batting for the Tampa Bay Rays in 2011

In 2013, Lobatón hit .249/.320/.394 with 7 home runs and 32 RBI in 100 games for Tampa Bay. Lobatón hit a 9th inning walk-off home run off of Boston Red Sox closer Koji Uehara to defeat the Red Sox in game three of the 2013 American League Division Series. Lobatón became the only Rays player to hit a walk-off home run in the postseason, and the first Ray to hit a home run into the Rays Touch Tank (the others being Luis Gonzalez and Miguel Cabrera). It was the only walk-off home run of the 2013 postseason.

=== Washington Nationals ===
On February 13, 2014, Lobatón was traded to the Washington Nationals (along with Felipe Rivero and Drew Vettleson) in exchange for Nathan Karns. In 2014, Lobatón played in 66 games for the Nationals, slashing .234/.287/.304 with 2 home runs and 12 RBI. The next year, he played in 44 games for Washington, slashing .199/.279/.294. In 2016, Lobatón hit .232/.319/.374 in 39 games for the big league club. Lobatón and the Nationals avoided salary arbitration on December 1, 2016, agreeing to a $1.575 million salary for the 2017 season. In March 2017, he declined an offer to replace Salvador Pérez on the roster of the Venezuela national baseball team at the 2017 World Baseball Classic so that he could stay in spring training with Nationals and compete for a spot on the club's roster. In 51 games for the Nationals in 2017, Lobatón slashed .170/.248/.277, and became a free agent after the season

=== New York Mets ===
On December 15, 2017, Lobatón signed a minor league contract with the New York Mets organization. On April 13, 2018, Lobatón was selected to the active roster. He was designated for assignment on May 19 after hitting .152 in 52 plate appearances and was outrighted to the Triple-A Las Vegas 51s. He had his contract purchased again on June 1, 2018. Lobatón was again designated for assignment on June 11, 2018. He cleared waivers and was outrighted to Triple-A. He finished the year in New York, after again being selected to the roster on September 8, with a major league slash line of .143/.246/.224

=== Seattle Mariners ===
On December 7, 2018, Lobatón signed a minor league contract with the Seattle Mariners organization. He was assigned to the Triple-A Tacoma Rainiers to begin the year. In 75 games with Tacoma, he batted .236/.305/.434 with 13 home runs and 38 RBI.

=== Los Angeles Dodgers ===
On August 9, 2019, Lobatón was traded to the Los Angeles Dodgers in exchange for cash considerations. He finished the year with the Triple–A Oklahoma City Dodgers, posting a batting line of .234/.339/.383 with one home run and five RBI in 15 games. Lobatón elected free agency following the season on November 4.

On January 9, 2020, Lobatón re–signed with the Dodgers organization on a minor league contract. He did not play in a game for the organization in 2020 due to the cancellation of the minor league season because of the COVID-19 pandemic. Lobatón was released by Los Angeles on July 1.

=== Chicago Cubs ===
On July 15, 2020, Lobatón signed a minor league deal with the Chicago Cubs. Lobatón was released by the organization on September 7, 2020. On February 12, 2021, Lobatón re-signed with the Cubs on a minor league contract that included an invitation to Spring Training. He was assigned to the Triple-A Iowa Cubs to begin the season, and hit .179/.347/.410 in 15 games for the team. On June 11, Lobatón was selected to the active roster. In a June 29 game against the Milwaukee Brewers, Lobatón sprained his shoulder attempting to avoid a collision with Josh Hader at first base. He was placed on the 60-day injured list the following day. He became a free agent after the 2021 season.

== Personal life ==
Lobaton married his wife, Nina, at Tropicana Field on July 3, 2012. The couple had a son in 2013.

== See also ==
- List of Major League Baseball players from Venezuela
