= 2015 Tampa Bay Rays season =

2015 Tampa Bay Rays
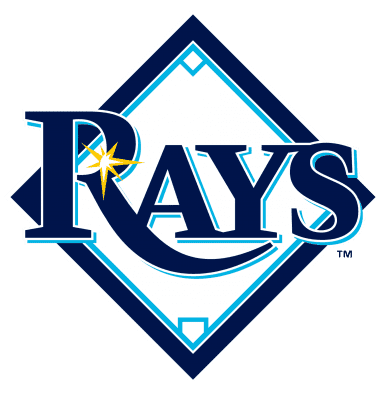
- League: American League
- Division: East
- Ballpark: Tropicana Field
- City: St. Petersburg, Florida
- Record: 80–82 (.494)
- Divisional place: 4th
- Owners: Stuart Sternberg
- General managers: Matthew Silverman
- Managers: Kevin Cash
- Television: Sun Sports (Dewayne Staats, Brian Anderson, Todd Kalas, Emily Austen)
- Radio: Tampa Bay Rays Radio Network (English) (Andy Freed, Dave Wills, Todd Kalas); WGES (Spanish) (Ricardo Taveras, Enrique Oliu)

The Tampa Bay Rays 2015 season was the Rays' 18th season of Major League Baseball and the eighth as the "Rays" (all at Tropicana Field)

== Offseason ==
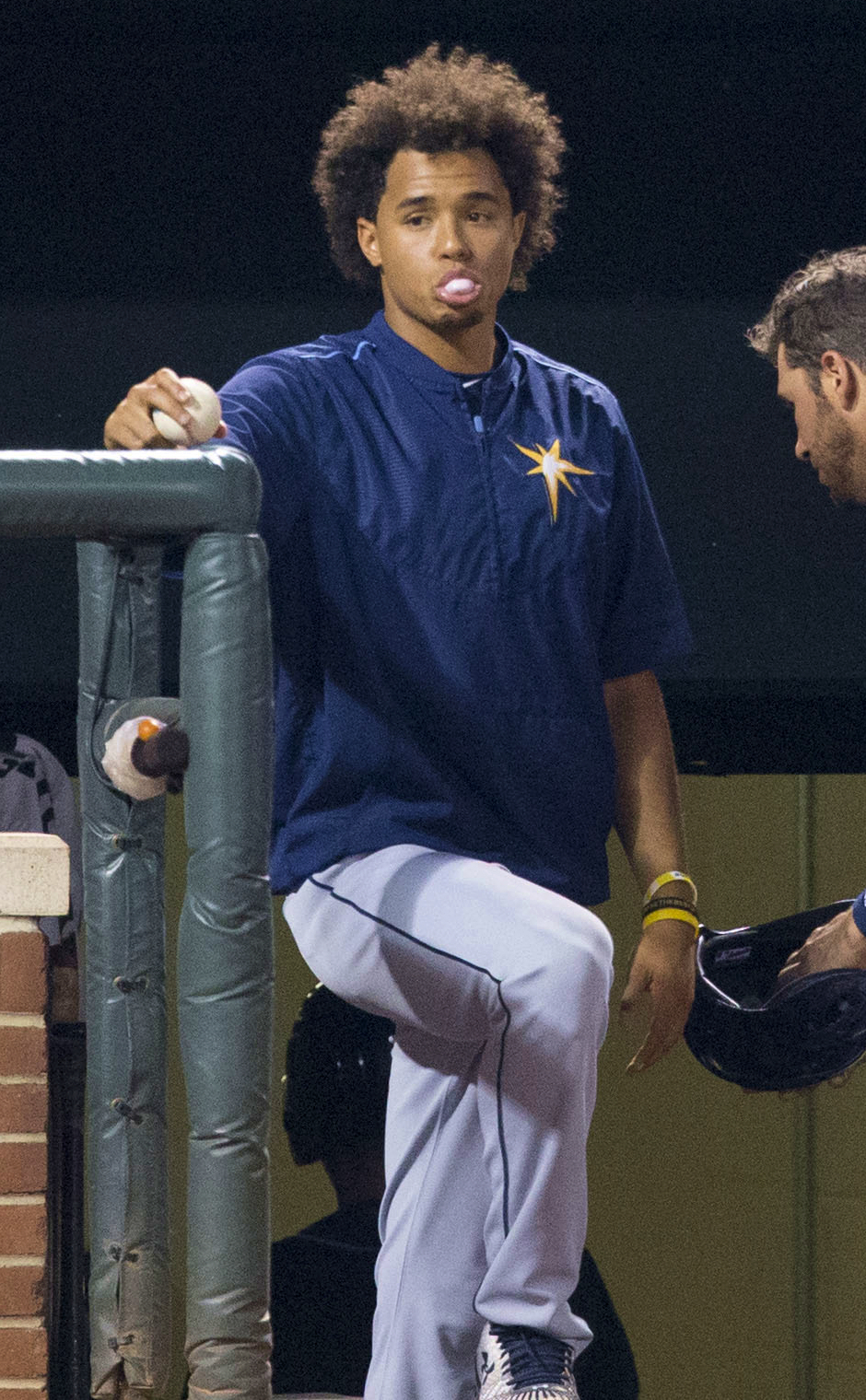
All-Star pitcher Chris Archer.

- November 3: Designated Vince Belnome and Jerry Sands for assignment.
- November 4: Signed Eduar Quinonez to a minor league contract.
- November 5: Traded Cesar Ramos to the Los Angeles Angels for Mark Sappington.
- November 14: Traded Jeremy Hellickson to the Arizona Diamondbacks for Andrew Velazquez and Justin Williams.
- November 20: Traded Adam Liberatore and Joel Peralta to the Los Angeles Dodgers for Greg Harris and José Domínguez, promoted 5 players from the minors, invited 2 players to spring training, and designated Michael Kohn for assignment.
- November 24: Released Jose Molina and Cole Figueroa.
- November 25: Signed Marlon Constante to a minor league contract.
- November 26: Signed Ernesto Frieri and Thomas Lebron (minor league contract).
- December 1: Traded Sean Rodriguez to the Pittsburgh Pirates for Buddy Borden and cash.
- December 2: Signed Ender Gonzalez to a minor league contract.
- December 12: Signed 4 players to a minor league contract and invited 3 of them to spring training.
- December 16: Traded Matt Joyce to the Angels for Kevin Jepsen.
- December 17: Signed Jhan Mariñez to a minor league contract.
- December 19: Traded Wil Myers, Ryan Hanigan, and Jose Castillo to the San Diego Padres for René Rivera, Burch Smith, and Jake Bauers. Also received Steven Souza and Travis Ott from the Washington Nationals.
- December 23: Sent Brandon Gomes to the minors.
- January 3: Signed Joey Butler and Juan Francisco to a minor league contract and invited them to spring training.
- January 5: Signed Mayo Acosta to a minor league contract and invited him to spring training.
- January 10:' Signed Asdrúbal Cabrera and traded Ben Zobrist and Yunel Escobar to the Oakland Athletics for Boog Powell, Daniel Robertson, John Jaso, and cash.
- January 16: Signed Everett Teaford to a minor league contract and invited him to spring training.
- January 21: Signed Robert Zarate to a minor league contract and invited him to spring training.
- January 23: Received Mike Marjama from the Chicago White Sox for a player to be named later.
- February 2: Invited 7 players to spring training and signed 2 of them to a minor league contract.

== Season standings ==
=== American League East ===
AL East
Team	W	L	Pct.	GB	Home	Road
Toronto Blue Jays	93	69	.574	—	53‍–‍28	40‍–‍41
New York Yankees	87	75	.537	6	45‍–‍36	42‍–‍39
Baltimore Orioles	81	81	.500	12	47‍–‍31	34‍–‍50
Tampa Bay Rays	80	82	.494	13	42‍–‍42	38‍–‍40
Boston Red Sox	78	84	.481	15	43‍–‍38	35‍–‍46

=== American League Wild Card ===
Division leaders
Team	W	L	Pct.
Kansas City Royals	95	67	.586
Toronto Blue Jays	93	69	.574
Texas Rangers	88	74	.543

Wild Card teams (Top 2 teams qualify for postseason)
Team	W	L	Pct.	GB
New York Yankees	87	75	.537	+1
Houston Astros	86	76	.531	—
Los Angeles Angels of Anaheim	85	77	.525	1
Minnesota Twins	83	79	.512	3
Cleveland Indians	81	80	.503	4½
Baltimore Orioles	81	81	.500	5
Tampa Bay Rays	80	82	.494	6
Boston Red Sox	78	84	.481	8
Chicago White Sox	76	86	.469	10
Seattle Mariners	76	86	.469	10
Detroit Tigers	74	87	.460	11½
Oakland Athletics	68	94	.420	18

=== Record against opponents ===
2015 American League record Source: MLB Standings Grid – 2015
Team	BAL	BOS	CWS	CLE	DET	HOU	KC	LAA	MIN	NYY	OAK	SEA	TB	TEX	TOR	NL
Baltimore	—	11–8	3–3	5–1	4–3	3–4	3–4	2–4	0–7	10–9	6–1	3–3	10–9	1–6	8–11	12–8
Boston	8–11	—	3–4	2–4	4–2	2–4	4–3	2–5	2–5	8–11	5–1	4–3	9–10	2–5	10–9	13–7
Chicago	3–3	4–3	—	10–9	9–10	5–1	7–12	4–3	6–13	2–5	5–2	4–3	1–5	3–3	4–3	9–11
Cleveland	1–5	4–2	9–10	—	7–11	5–2	9–10	4–2	7–12	5–2	3–4	4–3	5–2	3–3	3–4	12–8
Detroit	3–4	2–4	10–9	11–7	—	3–4	9–10	1–6	11–8	2–5	2–4	4–3	3–3	2–5	2–4	9–11
Houston	4–3	4–2	1–5	2–5	4–3	—	4–2	10–9	3–3	4–3	10–9	12–7	2–5	6–13	4–3	16–4
Kansas City	4–3	3–4	12–7	10–9	10–9	2–4	—	6–1	12–7	2–4	5–1	4–2	6–1	3–4	3–4	13–7
Los Angeles	4–2	5–2	3–4	2–4	6–1	9–10	1–6	—	5–2	2–4	11–8	12–7	3–3	12–7	2–5	8–12
Minnesota	7–0	5–2	13–6	12–7	8–11	3–3	7–12	2–5	—	1–5	4–3	4–3	4–2	3–3	2–5	8–12
New York	9–10	11–8	5–2	2–5	5–2	3–4	4–2	4–2	5–1	—	3–4	5–1	12–7	2–5	6–13	11–9
Oakland	1–6	1–5	2–5	4–3	4–2	9–10	1–5	8–11	3–4	4–3	—	6–13	3–4	10–9	1–5	11–9
Seattle	3–3	3–4	3–4	3–4	3–4	7–12	2–4	7–12	3–4	1–5	13–6	—	4–3	12–7	4–2	8–12
Tampa Bay	9–10	10–9	5–1	2–5	3–3	5–2	1–6	3–3	2–4	7–12	4–3	3–4	—	2–5	10–9	14–6
Texas	6–1	5–2	3–3	3–3	5–2	13–6	4–3	7–12	3–3	5–2	9–10	7–12	5–2	—	2–4	11–9
Toronto	11–8	9–10	3–4	4–3	4–2	3–4	4–3	5–2	5–2	13–6	5–1	2–4	9–10	4–2	—	12–8

=== Game log ===
2015 Game Log (80–82)
April: 12–10 (Home: 6–6; Away: 6–4)

#	Date	Opponent	Score	Win	Loss	Save	Attendance	Record	Recap
1	April 6	Orioles	2–6	Tillman (1–0)	**Archer** (0–1)	—	31,042	0–1	
2	April 7	Orioles	5–6	Gausman (1–0)	**Karns** (0–1)	Britton (1)	13,906	0–2	
3	April 8	Orioles	2–0	**Odorizzi** (1–0)	González (0–1)	**Boxberger** (1)	13,569	1–2	
4	April 10	@ Marlins	9–10 (10)	Morris (1–0)	**Boxberger** (0–1)	—	17,375	1–3	
5	April 11	@ Marlins	2–0	**Archer** (1–1)	Cosart (0–1)	**Boxberger** (2)	17,830	2–3	
6	April 12	@ Marlins	8–5	**Karns** (1–1)	Álvarez (0–2)	**Frieri** (1)	20,199	3–3	
7	April 13	@ Blue Jays	2–1	**Odorizzi** (2–0)	Dickey (0–1)	**Boxberger** (3)	48,414	4–3	
8	April 14	@ Blue Jays	3–2	**Geltz** (1–0)	Castro (0–1)	**Jepsen** (1)	17,264	5–3	
9	April 15	@ Blue Jays	7–12	Buehrle (2–0)	**Ramírez** (0–1)	—	15,086	5–4	
10	April 16	@ Blue Jays	4–2	**Archer** (2–1)	Sanchez (0–2)	**Boxberger** (4)	14,433	6–4	
11	April 17	Yankees	4–5	Betances (2–0)	**Jepsen** (0–1)	Miller (3)	15,572	6–5	
12	April 18	Yankees	0–9	Tanaka (2–1)	**Odorizzi** (2–1)	—	20,824	6–6	
13	April 19	Yankees	3–5	Pineda (2–0)	**Andriese** (0–1)	Miller (4)	21,791	6–7	
14	April 21	Red Sox	0–1	Miley (1–1)	**Archer** (2–2)	Uehara (2)	14,307	6–8	
15	April 22	Red Sox	7–5	**Boxberger** (1–1)	Mujica (1–1)	**Geltz** (1)	12,733	7–8	
16	April 23	Red Sox	2–1	**Boxberger** (2–1)	Varvaro (0–1)	—	13,834	8–8	
17	April 24	Blue Jays	12–3	**Dominguez** (1–0)	Dickey (0–2)	**Andriese** (1)	11,897	9–8	
18	April 25	Blue Jays	4–2	**Frieri** (1–0)	Cecil (1–2)	**Boxberger** (5)	19,772	10–8	
19	April 26	Blue Jays	5–1	**Archer** (3–2)	Buehrle (3–1)	—	21,107	11–8	
20	April 27	@ Yankees	1–4	Wilson (1–0)	**Gomes** (0–1)	Miller (8)	34,590	11–9	
21	April 28	@ Yankees	2–4	Whitley (1–0)	**Odorizzi** (2–2)	Martin (1)	36,934	11–10	
22	April 29	@ Yankees	3–2 (13)	**Gomes** (1–1)	Shreve (1–1)	**Frieri** (2)	30,055	12–10	

May: 14–15 (Home: 7–8; Away: 7–7)

#	Date	Opponent	Score	Win	Loss	Save	Attendance	Record	Recap
23	May 1	@ Orioles^{[a]}	2–0	**Colomé** (1–0)	Tillman (2–3)	**Boxberger** (6)	9,945	13–10	
24	May 2	@ Orioles^{[a]}	0–4	González (3–1)	**Archer** (3–3)	Brach (1)	12,789	13–11	
25	May 3	@ Orioles^{[a]}	2–4	Hunter (1–1)	**Geltz** (1–1)	Britton (5)	16,652	13–12	
26	May 4	@ Red Sox	5–1	**Odorizzi** (3–2)	Buchholz (1–4)	—	34,541	14–12	
27	May 5	@ Red Sox	0–2	Porcello (3–2)	**Smyly** (0–1)	Uehara (5)	33,688	14–13	
28	May 6	@ Red Sox	5–3	**Colomé** (2–0)	Masterson (2–1)	**Boxberger** (7)	35,060	15–13	
29	May 7	Rangers	4–5	Claudio (1–0)	**Archer** (3–4)	Feliz (4)	8,701	15–14	
30	May 8	Rangers	8–2	**Karns** (2–1)	Gallardo (2–5)	—	11,704	16–14	
31	May 9	Rangers	7–2	**Bellatti** (1–0)	Detwiler (0–4)	**Boxberger** (8)	20,943	17–14	
32	May 10	Rangers	1–2	Kela (3–1)	**Jepsen** (0–2)	Feliz (5)	14,521	17–15	
33	May 11	Yankees	5–11	Sabathia (1–5)	**Colomé** (2–1)	—	10,619	17–16	
34	May 12	Yankees	4–2	**Jepsen** (1–2)	Eovaldi (3–1)	**Boxberger** (9)	10,417	18–16	
35	May 13	Yankees	3–2	**Karns** (3–1)	Warren (2–2)	**Boxberger** (10)	11,924	18–16	
36	May 14	Yankees	6–1	**Ramírez** (1–1)	Whitley (1–2)	**Andriese** (2)	11,977	19–16	
37	May 15	@ Twins	2–3	Hughes (3–4)	**Odorizzi** (3–3)	Perkins (12)	24,018	20–17	
38	May 16	@ Twins	4–6	Duensing (1–0)	**Jepsen** (1–3)	Perkins (13)	27,128	20–18	
39	May 17	@ Twins	11–3	**Archer** (4–4)	Gibson (3–3)	—	23,708	21–18	
40	May 19	@ Braves	5–3	**Ramírez** (2–1)	Foltynewicz (2–1)	**Boxberger** (11)	20,120	22–18	
41	May 20	@ Braves	1–2	Cunniff (2–0)	**Odorizzi** (3–4)	Grilli (12)	24,549	22–19	
42	May 21	Athletics	3–0	**Colomé** (3–1)	Chavez (1–4)	**Boxberger** (12)	10,605	23–19	
43	May 22	Athletics	5–2	**Archer** (5–4)	Kazmir (2–3)	**Boxberger** (13)	12,329	24–19	
44	May 23	Athletics	0–5	Graveman (2–2)	**Karns** (3–2)	—	15,207	24–20	
45	May 24	Athletics	2–7	Gray (5–2)	**Ramírez** (2–2)	—	15,692	24–21	
46	May 25	Mariners	1–4	Elías (2–1)	**Odorizzi** (3–5)	Rodney (13)	10,401	24–22	
47	May 26	Mariners	6–7	Rodney (2–2)	**Boxberger** (2–2)	Beimel (1)	9,628	24–23	
48	May 27	Mariners	0–3	Hernández (8–1)	**Boxberger** (2–3)	—	10,365	24–24	
49	May 29	@ Orioles	1–2	O'Day (1–0)	**Gomes** (1–2)	—	45,505	24–25	
50	May 30	@ Orioles	3–0	**Ramírez** (3–2)	Chen (1–4)	**Boxberger** (14)	38,177	25–25	
51	May 31	@ Orioles	9–5	**Odorizzi** (4–5)	Tillman (2–7)	**Boxberger** (15)	36,945	26–25	

June: 16–12 (Home: 7–9; Away: 9–3)

#	Date	Opponent	Score	Win	Loss	Save	Attendance	Record	Recap
52	June 1	@ Angels	3–7	Richards (5–3)	**Colomé** (3–2)	—	27,078	26–26	
53	June 2	@ Angels	6–1	**Archer** (6–4)	Wilson (3–4)	—	28,771	27–26	
54	June 3	@ Angels	6–5 (10)	**Boxberger** (3–3)	Street (2–2)	**Geltz** (2)	28,245	28–26	
55	June 4	@ Mariners	2–1	**Ramírez** (4–2)	Elías (2–3)	**Jepsen** (2)	16,096	29–26	
56	June 5	@ Mariners	1–0	**Bellatti** (2–0)	Rodney (2–3)	**Jepsen** (3)	20,695	30–26	
57	June 6	@ Mariners	1–2	Hernández (9–2)	**Geltz** (1–2)	Smith (1)	31,106	30–27	
58	June 7	@ Mariners	3–1	**Archer** (7–4)	Montgomery (0–1)	**Jepsen** (4)	27,906	31–27	
59	June 9	Angels	2–8	Shoemaker (4–4)	**Karns** (3–3)	—	11,617	31–28	
60	June 10	Angels	4–2	**Ramírez** (5–2)	Weaver (4–6)	**McGee** (1)	10,088	32–28	
61	June 11	Angels	2–6	Richards (6–4)	**Jepsen** (1–4)	—	10,779	32–29	
62	June 12	White Sox	7–5	**Andriese** (1–1)	Danks (3–3)	**McGee** (2)	13,448	33–29	
63	June 13	White Sox	5–4	**Boxberger** (4–3)	Putnam (1–2)	**McGee** (3)	20,248	34–29	
64	June 14	White Sox	2–1	**Riefenhauser** (1–0)	Sale (6–3)	**Jepsen** (5)	17,962	35–29	
65	June 15	Nationals	6–1	**Ramírez** (6–2)	González (4–4)	—	10,216	36–29	
66	June 16	Nationals	4–16	Roark (3–2)	**Colomé** (3–3)	—	11,491	36–30	
67	June 17	@ Nationals	5–0	**Andriese** (2–1)	Zimmerman (5–5)	—	28,929	37–30	
68	June 18	@ Nationals	5–3	**Archer** (8–4)	Fister (2–3)	**Boxberger** (16)	29,242	38–30	
69	June 19	@ Indians	4–1	**Karns** (4–3)	Carrasco (8–6)	**Boxberger** (17)	22,811	39–30	
70	June 20	@ Indians	4–1	**Cedeño** (1–0)	Kluber (3–9)	**Boxberger** (18)	24,670	40–30	
71	June 21	@ Indians	0–1	Allen (1–2)	**Jepsen** (1–5)	—	20,847	40–31	
72	June 22	Blue Jays	5–8	Hutchison (7–1)	**Andriese** (2–2)	Osuna (1)	10,324	40–32	
73	June 23	Blue Jays	4–3	**Archer** (9–4)	Dickey (3–7)	**Boxberger** (19)	11,474	41–32	
74	June 24	Blue Jays	0–1 (12)	Cecil (2–4)	**Gomes** (1–3)	Delabar (1)	18,469	41–33	
75	June 26	Red Sox	3–4 (10)	Ogando (2–0)	**Geltz** (1–3)	Uehara (15)	17,508	41–34	
76	June 27	Red Sox	4–1	**Andriese** (3–2)	Miley (7–7)	**Boxberger** (20)	23,876	42–34	
77	June 28	Red Sox	3–5	Masterson (3–2)	**Archer** (9–5)	Uehara (16)	21,963	42–35	
78	June 29	Indians	1–7	Anderson (1–0)	**Karns** (4–4)	—	11,802	42–36	
79	June 30	Indians	2–6	Salazar (7–3)	**Ramírez** (6–3)	—	10,437	42–37	

July: 9–16 (Home: 6–5; Away: 3–11)

#	Date	Opponent	Score	Win	Loss	Save	Attendance	Record	Recap
80	July 1	Indians	1–8	Carrasco (10–6)	**Colomé** (3–4)	—	11,394	42–38	
81	July 2	Indians	4–5 (10)	Shaw (1–1)	**Cedeño** (1–1)	Allen (15)	16,353	42–39	
82	July 3	@ Yankees	5–7 (12)	Shreve (6–1)	**Geltz** (1–4)	—	43,141	42–40	
83	July 4	@ Yankees	2–3	Betances (5–1)	**Boxberger** (4–4)	—	35,508	42–41	
84	July 5	@ Yankees	8–1	**Ramírez** (7–3)	Nova (1–2)	—	35,050	43–41	
—	July 6	@ Royals	Postponed (rain); Makeup: July 7						
85	July 7 (1)	@ Royals	5–9	Holland (3–0)	**Boxberger** (4–5)	—	22,386	43–42	
86	July 7 (2)	@ Royals	1–7	Finnegan (2–0)	**Gomes** (1–4)	—	28,119	43–43	
87	July 8	@ Royals	7–9	Guthrie (7–5)	**Archer** (9–6)	Holland (17)	28,204	43–44	
88	July 9	@ Royals	3–8	Ventura (4–6)	**Karns** (4–5)	—	32,308	43–45	
89	July 10	Astros	3–1	**Ramírez** (8–3)	McHugh (9–5)	**Boxberger** (21)	17,129	44–45	
90	July 11	Astros	3–0	**Odorizzi** (5–5)	Keuchel (11–4)	**Boxberger** (22)	18,479	45–45	
91	July 12	Astros	4–3	**Moore** (1–0)	McCullers (4–5)	**Boxberger** (23)	16,458	46–45	
–	July 14	86th All-Star Game	AL 6–3 NL	Price (1–0)	Kershaw (0–1)	—	43,656	—	Box
92	July 17	@ Blue Jays	2–6	Hutchison (9–2)	**Odorizzi** (5–6)	—	32,908	46–46	
93	July 18	@ Blue Jays	3–2	**Jepsen** (2–5)	Tepera (0–1)	McGee (4)	41,583	47–46	
94	July 19	@ Blue Jays	0–4	Estrada (7–5)	**Archer** (9–7)	—	41,683	47–47	
95	July 20	@ Phillies	3–5	Buchanan (1–5)	**Moore** (1–1)	Papelbon (16)	20,148	47–48	
96	July 21	@ Phillies	1–0	**Karns** (5–5)	Nola (0–1)	**Boxberger** (24)	28,703	48–48	
97	July 22	@ Phillies	4–5 (10)	Papelbon (2–1)	**Boxberger** (2–6)	—	22,252	48–49	
98	July 24	Orioles	3–1	**Colomé** (4–4)	O'Day (5–1)	**McGee** (5)	17,838	49–49	
99	July 25	Orioles	1–5	González (9–6)	**Ramírez** (8–4)	—	24,327	49–50	
100	July 26	Orioles	2–5	Chen (5–6)	**Moore** (1–2)	Britton (25)	18,613	49–51	
101	July 27	Tigers	5–2	**Karns** (6–5)	Sánchez (10–8)	**Boxberger** (25)	13,348	50–51	
102	July 28	Tigers	10–2	**Odorizzi** (6–6)	Price (9–4)	—	16,326	51–51	
103	July 29	Tigers	1–2	Verlander (1–3)	**Archer** (9–8)	Soria (23)	28,057	51–52	
104	July 31	@ Red Sox	5–7	Tazawa (2–3)	**McGee** (0–1)	Uehara (23)	36,715	51–53	

August: 14–13 (Home: 6–5; Away: 8–8)

#	Date	Opponent	Score	Win	Loss	Save	Attendance	Record	Recap
105	August 1	@ Red Sox	7–11	Kelly (3–6)	**Moore** (1–3)	Machi (1)	35,944	51–54	
106	August 2	@ Red Sox	4–3	**Geltz** (2–4)	Tazawa (2–4)	**Boxberger** (26)	35,699	52–54	
107	August 3	@ White Sox	5–4	**McGee** (1–1)	Robertson (4–3)	**Boxberger** (27)	16,496	53–54	
108	August 4	@ White Sox	11–3	**Archer** (10–8)	Sale (9–7)	—	18,499	54–54	
109	August 5	@ White Sox	5–6 (10)	Robertson (5–3)	**Boxberger** (4–7)	—	20,028	54–55	
110	August 7	Mets	3–4	Clippard (2–3)	**Boxberger** (4–8)	Familia (30)	23,145	54–56	
111	August 8	Mets	5–4	**Karns** (7–5)	Syndergaard (6–6)	**Boxberger** (28)	31,042	55–56	
112	August 9	Mets	4–3	**Cedeño** (2–1)	Colón (10–11)	**McGee** (6)	26,681	56–56	
113	August 11	Braves	2–0	**Ramírez** (9–4)	Pérez (4–3)	**Cedeño** (1)	15,506	57–56	
114	August 12	Braves	9–6	**Colomé** (5–4)	Marksberry (0–1)	**Boxberger** (29)	16,337	58–56	
115	August 14	@ Rangers	3–5	Dyson (4–4)	**McGee** (1–2)	Tolleson (22)	32,512	58–57	
116	August 15	@ Rangers	4–12	Lewis (13–5)	**Archer** (10–9)	—	32,351	58–58	
117	August 16	@ Rangers	3–5	Gallardo (9–9)	**Smyly** (0–2)	Tolleson (23)	29,167	58–59	
118	August 17	@ Astros	9–2	**Ramírez** (10–4)	Kazmir (6–8)	—	16,256	59–59	
119	August 18	@ Astros	2–3 (10)	Gregerson (6–2)	**Boxberger** (4–9)	—	17,749	59–60	
120	August 19	@ Astros	2–3 (13)	Fields (4–1)	**Andriese** (3–3)	—	26,001	59–61	
121	August 20	@ Astros	1–0	**Archer** (11–9)	McHugh (13–7)	—	18,177	60–61	
122	August 21	@ Athletics	2–1	**Smyly** (1–2)	Bassitt (1–5)	**Boxberger** (30)	20,671	61–61	
123	August 22	@ Athletics	5–4	**Colomé** (6–4)	Venditte (0–2)	—	35,067	62–61	
124	August 23	@ Athletics	2–8	Rodriguez (3–1)	**Geltz** (2–5)	—	19,425	62–62	
125	August 25	Twins	7–11	Graham (1–1)	**Andriese** (3–4)	—	9,632	62–63	
126	August 26	Twins	3–5	Duensing (4–0)	**Archer** (11–10)	Jepsen (8)	9,205	62–64	
127	August 27	Twins	5–4	**Gomes** (2–4)	Milone (6–4)	**Boxberger** (31)	9,375	63–64	
128	August 28	Royals	2–3	Vólquez (12–7)	**Ramírez** (10–5)	Holland (29)	13,622	63–65	
129	August 29	Royals	3–6	Medlen (3–0)	**Odorizzi** (6–7)	Davis (13)	24,372	63–66	
130	August 30	Royals	3–2	**Cedeño** (3–1)	Hochevar (1–1)	**Boxberger** (32)	18,634	64–66	
131	August 31	@ Orioles	6–3	**Archer** (12–10)	Chen (8–7)	**Boxberger** (33)	19,841	65–66	

September: 12–15 (Home: 6–6; Away: 6–9)

#	Date	Opponent	Score	Win	Loss	Save	Attendance	Record	Recap
132	September 1	@ Orioles	11–2	**Smyly** (2–2)	Tillman (9–10)	—	22,987	66–66	
133	September 2	@ Orioles	6–7 (11)	Brach (5–2)	**Andriese** (3–5)	—	15,963	66–67	
134	September 4	@ Yankees	2–5	Severino (3–2)	**Odorizzi** (6–8)	Miller (30)	32,530	66–68	
135	September 5	@ Yankees	3–2	**Cedeño** (4–1)	Eovaldi (13–4)	**Boxberger** (34)	35,030	67–68	
136	September 6	@ Yankees	4–6	Nova (6–7)	**Archer** (12–11)	Miller (31)	35,299	67–69	
137	September 7	@ Tigers	4–5	Alburquerque (4–1)	**Gomes** (2–5)	Rondón (4)	27,958	67–70	
138	September 8	@ Tigers	7–8 (13)	Ryan (2–3)	**Bellatti** (2–1)	—	26,526	67–71	
139	September 9	@ Tigers	8–0	**Odorizzi** (7–8)	Lobstein (3–7)	—	25,932	68–71	
140	September 11	Red Sox	8–4	**Bellatti** (3–1)	Tazawa (2–7)	—	14,796	69–71	
141	September 12	Red Sox	4–10	Porcello (8–12)	**Moore** (1–4)	—	20,698	69–72	
142	September 13	Red Sox	0–2	Hembree (1–0)	**Romero** (0–1)	Ross (2)	15,402	69–73	
143	September 14	Yankees	1–4	Cotham (1–0)	**Boxberger** (4–10)	Miller (33)	11,940	69–74	
144	September 15	Yankees	6–3	**Odorizzi** (8–8)	Rumbelow (1–1)	**Gomes** (1)	13,539	70–74	
145	September 16	Yankees	1–3	Severino (4–3)	**Archer** (12–12)	Miller (34)	13,299	70–75	
146	September 17	Orioles	3–4	Roe (4–2)	**Colomé** (6–5)	O'Day (3)	9,617	70–76	
147	September 18	Orioles	8–6	**Smyly** (3–2)	Wilson (2–2)	**Boxberger** (35)	10,967	71–76	
148	September 19	Orioles	1–2	Chen (10–7)	**Ramírez** (10–6)	Britton (34)	17,053	71–77	
149	September 20	Orioles	7–6	**Yates** (1–0)	Britton (4–1)	—	17,801	72–77	
150	September 21	@ Red Sox	7–8	Machi (2–0)	**Gomes** (2–6)	Ross (5)	33,673	72–78	
151	September 22	@ Red Sox	5–2	**Moore** (2–4)	Koehler (3–3)	**Boxberger** (36)	33,673	73–78	
152	September 23	@ Red Sox	6–2	**Smyly** (4–2)	Porcello (8–14)	**Boxberger** (37)	32,753	74–78	
153	September 24	@ Red Sox	4–2	**Ramírez** (11–6)	Miley (11–11)	**Boxberger** (38)	34,916	75–78	
154	September 25	@ Blue Jays	3–5	Dickey (11–11)	**Odorizzi** (8–9)	Osuna (18)	47,696	75–79	
155	September 26	@ Blue Jays	8–10	Price (18–5)	**Archer** (12–13)	Osuna (19)	47,094	75–80	
156	September 27	@ Blue Jays	4–5	Cecil (4–5)	**Geltz** (2–6)	—	47,287	75–81	
157	September 29	Marlins	4–2	**Colomé** (7–5)	Morris (5–4)	**Boxberger** (39)	9,150	76–81	
158	September 30	Marlins	6–4	**Smyly** (5–2)	Cosart (2–5)	**Boxberger** (40)	9,431	77–81	

October: 3–1 (Home: 3–1; Away: 0–0)

#	Date	Opponent	Score	Win	Loss	Save	Attendance	Record	Recap
159	October 1	Marlins	4–1	**Odorizzi** (9–9)	Fernández (6–1)	**Boxberger** (41)	9,657	78–81	
160	October 2	Blue Jays	4–8	Buehrle (15–7)	**Romero** (0–2)	—	13,668	78–82	
161	October 3	Blue Jays	4–3	**Colomé** (8–5)	Osuna (1–6)	—	21,963	79–82	
162	October 4	Blue Jays	12–3	**Moore** (3–4)	Buehrle (15–8)	—	15,815	80–82	

Legend: = Win = Loss = Postponement
Bold = Rays team member

- ^{a} Games moved to Tropicana Field for safety concerns due to the 2015 Baltimore protests.

== Roster ==
2015 Tampa Bay Rays
Roster
Pitchers: 35 Matt Andriese; 22 Chris Archer; 50 Grant Balfour; 56 Ronald Belisario; 38 Jeff Beliveau; 59 Andrew Bellatti; 26 Brad Boxberger; 31 Xavier Cedeño; 37 Álex Colomé; 52 José Domínguez; 43 Ernesto Frieri; 54 Steve Geltz; 47 Brandon Gomes; 58 Preston Guilmet; 40 Kevin Jepsen; 51 Nate Karns; 57 Jake McGee; 55 Matt Moore; 23 Jake Odorizzi; 30 Erasmo Ramírez; 34 C. J. Riefenhauser; 45 Enny Romero; 33 Drew Smyly; 50,59 Everett Teaford; 49 Kirby Yates	Catchers: 40 J. P. Arencibia; 19 Curt Casali; 46 Luke Maile; 44 René Rivera; 46 Bobby Wilson; Infielders: 1 Tim Beckham; 29 Ryan Brett; 13 Asdrúbal Cabrera; 31 Allan Dykstra; 10 Jake Elmore; 11 Logan Forsythe; 2 Nick Franklin; 36 Marc Krauss; 21 James Loney; 3 Evan Longoria; 36 Richie Shaffer	Outfielders: 9 Joey Butler; 7 David DeJesus; 5 Brandon Guyer; 28 John Jaso; 8 Desmond Jennings; 39 Kevin Kiermaier; 27 Mikie Mahtook; 7 Daniel Nava; 24 Grady Sizemore; 20 Steven Souza	Manager: 16 Kevin Cash; Coaches: 15 Rocco Baldelli (first base); 41 Stan Boroski (bullpen); 77 Scott Cursi (bullpen catcher); 6 Tom Foley (bench); 48 Jim Hickey (pitching); 25 Charlie Montoyo (third base); 4 Jamie Nelson (assistant hitting); 17 Derek Shelton (hitting)

== Statistics ==
=== Batting ===
Note: G = Games played; AB = At bats; R = Runs scored; H = Hits; 2B = Doubles; 3B = Triples; HR = Home runs; RBI = Runs batted in; BB = Base on balls; SO = Strikeouts; AVG = Batting average; SB = Stolen bases

Player	G	AB	R	H	2B	3B	HR	RBI	BB	SO	AVG	SB
Matt Andriese, P	25	1	0	0	0	0	0	0	0	0	.000	0
Chris Archer, P	34	5	0	0	0	0	0	0	0	3	.000	0
J. P. Arencibia, C	24	71	9	22	3	0	6	17	1	22	.310	0
Tim Beckham, 2B, SS	82	203	24	45	7	4	9	37	13	69	.222	3
Ronald Belisario, P	6	1	0	0	0	0	0	0	0	0	.000	0
Ryan Brett, 2B	3	3	0	2	1	0	0	0	1	0	.667	0
Joey Butler, DH, LF	88	257	30	71	12	0	8	30	16	82	.276	5
Asdrúbal Cabrera, SS	143	505	66	134	28	5	15	58	36	107	.265	6
Curt Casali, C	38	101	13	24	6	0	10	18	8	34	.238	0
David DeJesus, LF, DH	82	232	24	60	8	2	5	26	19	39	.259	3
Allan Dykstra, 1B	13	31	3	4	0	0	1	4	6	12	.129	0
Jake Elmore, 1B	51	141	10	29	5	0	2	16	12	25	.206	1
Logan Forsythe, 2B	153	540	69	152	33	2	17	68	55	111	.281	9
Nick Franklin, 1B, 2B, SS	44	101	11	16	4	1	3	7	7	37	.158	1
Brandon Guyer, LF	128	332	51	88	21	2	8	28	25	61	.265	10
John Jaso, DH, LF	70	185	23	53	17	0	5	22	28	39	.286	1
Desmond Jennings, OF	28	97	9	26	2	1	1	7	8	17	.268	5
Nate Karns, P	27	4	1	1	0	0	1	1	0	3	.250	0
Kevin Kiermaier, CF	151	505	62	133	25	12	10	40	24	95	.263	18
Marc Krauss, 1B	4	10	0	1	1	0	0	1	0	7	.100	0
James Loney, 1B	104	361	25	101	16	0	4	32	23	34	.280	2
Evan Longoria, 3B	160	604	74	163	35	1	21	73	51	132	.270	3
Mikie Mahtook, OF	41	105	22	31	5	1	9	19	6	31	.295	4
Luke Maile, C	15	35	2	6	3	0	0	2	0	8	.171	0
Matt Moore, P	12	1	0	0	0	0	0	0	0	0	.000	0
Daniel Nava, RF	31	73	7	17	2	0	1	3	12	19	.233	1
Jake Odorizzi, P	28	4	0	0	0	0	0	0	0	2	.000	0
Erasmo Ramírez, P	34	2	0	0	0	0	0	0	0	2	.000	0
René Rivera, C	110	298	16	53	14	0	5	26	11	86	.178	0
Richie Shaffer, 1B, DH, 3B	31	74	11	14	3	0	4	6	10	32	.189	0
Grady Sizemore, OF	58	175	20	45	12	0	6	27	14	37	.257	3
Steven Souza, RF	110	373	59	84	15	1	16	40	46	144	.225	12
Bobby Wilson, C	25	55	3	8	0	0	0	4	4	20	.145	0
Team totals	162	5485	644	1383	278	32	167	612	436	1310	.252	87

=== Pitching ===
Note: W = Wins; L = Losses; ERA = Earned run average; G = Games pitched; GS = Games started; SV = Saves; IP = Innings pitched; H = Hits allowed; R = Runs allowed; ER = Earned runs allowed; HR = Home runs allowed; BB = Walks allowed; K = Strikeouts

Player	W	L	ERA	G	GS	SV	IP	H	R	ER	HR	BB	K
Matt Andriese	3	5	4.11	25	8	2	65.2	69	32	30	8	18	49
Chris Archer	12	13	3.23	34	34	0	212.0	175	85	76	19	66	252
Grant Balfour	0	0	6.23	6	0	0	4.1	3	3	3	1	4	0
Ronald Belisario	0	0	7.88	6	0	0	8.0	8	7	7	0	4	6
Jeff Beliveau	0	0	13.50	5	0	0	2.2	6	4	4	1	1	2
Andrew Bellatti	3	1	2.31	17	0	0	23.1	16	7	6	4	10	18
Brad Boxberger	4	10	3.71	69	0	41	63.0	54	29	26	9	32	74
Xavier Cedeño	4	1	2.09	61	0	1	43.0	37	11	10	3	12	43
Álex Colomé	8	5	3.94	43	13	0	109.2	112	50	48	9	31	88
José Domínguez	1	0	0.00	4	0	0	5.2	2	0	0	0	2	5
Jake Elmore	0	0	9.00	1	0	0	1.0	3	1	1	1	0	0
Nick Franklin	0	0	18.00	1	0	0	1.0	3	2	2	1	0	0
Ernesto Frieri	1	0	4.63	22	0	2	23.1	20	12	12	6	11	19
Steve Geltz	2	6	3.74	70	2	2	67.1	45	31	28	8	26	61
Brandon Gomes	2	6	4.27	63	0	1	59.0	55	28	28	10	15	44
Preston Guilmet	0	0	5.06	3	0	0	5.1	5	3	3	1	2	5
Kevin Jepsen	2	5	2.81	46	0	5	41.2	34	15	13	4	20	34
Nate Karns	7	5	3.67	27	26	0	147.0	132	62	60	19	56	145
Jake McGee	1	2	2.41	39	0	6	37.1	27	11	10	3	8	48
Matt Moore	3	4	5.43	12	12	0	63.0	74	40	38	9	23	46
Jake Odorizzi	9	9	3.35	28	28	0	169.1	149	65	63	18	46	150
Erasmo Ramírez	11	6	3.75	34	27	0	163.1	145	73	68	16	40	126
C. J. Riefenhauser	1	0	5.52	17	0	0	14.2	15	10	9	3	7	7
Enny Romero	0	2	5.10	23	0	0	30.0	39	18	17	1	13	31
Drew Smyly	5	2	3.11	12	12	0	66.2	58	24	23	11	20	77
Everett Teaford	0	0	1.59	4	0	0	5.2	5	1	1	0	3	4
Kirby Yates	1	0	7.97	20	0	0	20.1	23	18	18	10	7	21
Team totals	80	82	3.74	162	162	60	1453.1	1314	642	604	175	477	1355

== Farm system ==
Level	Team	League	Manager
AAA	Durham Bulls	International League	Jared Sandberg
AA	Montgomery Biscuits	Southern League	Brady Williams
A	Charlotte Stone Crabs	Florida State League	Michael Johns
A	Bowling Green Hot Rods	Midwest League	Reinaldo Ruiz
A-Short Season	Hudson Valley Renegades	New York–Penn League	Tim Parenton
Rookie	Princeton Rays	Appalachian League	Danny Sheaffer
Rookie	GCL Rays	Gulf Coast League	Jim Morrison
Rookie	VSL Rays	Venezuelan Summer League	
Rookie	DSL Rays	Dominican Summer League	Julio Zorrilla

LEAGUE CHAMPIONS: Charlotte
