= Tim Beckham =

American baseball player (born 1990)

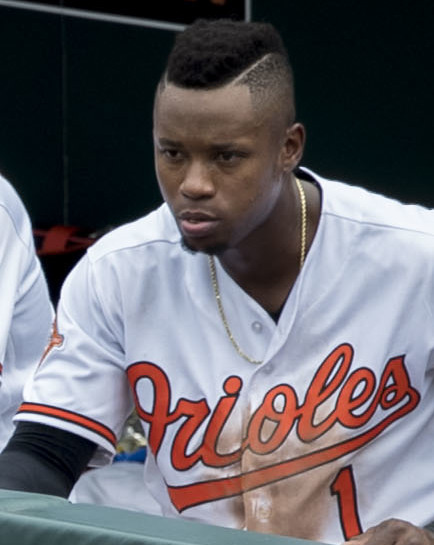
- Beckham with the Orioles in 2017
- Infielder
- Born: January 27, 1990 (age 36); Griffin, Georgia, U.S.
- Batted: Right Threw: Right

MLB debut
- September 19, 2013, for the Tampa Bay Rays

Last MLB appearance
- August 24, 2022, for the Minnesota Twins

MLB statistics
- Batting average: .246
- Home runs: 63
- Runs batted in: 199
- Stats at Baseball Reference

Teams
- Tampa Bay Rays (2013, 2015–2017); Baltimore Orioles (2017–2018); Seattle Mariners (2019); Minnesota Twins (2022)

Timothy Lamar Beckham (born January 27, 1990) is an American former professional baseball infielder. He played in Major League Baseball (MLB) for the Tampa Bay Rays, Baltimore Orioles, Seattle Mariners, and Minnesota Twins. Beckham was the first overall selection of the 2008 MLB draft by the Rays and received a signing bonus of $6.15 million. He made his MLB debut in 2013, and played for the Rays through 2017 when they traded him to Baltimore. He played for the Orioles in 2017 and 2018, for Seattle in 2019, and for Minnesota in 2022.

== Early years ==
Beckham grew up in the Crestview Heights neighborhood of Griffin, Georgia. He often played baseball in his yard with his two older brothers. Beckham played football, basketball, and baseball. However, he quit baseball while in grade school to focus on football and basketball. Encouraged by his brothers, he got back into baseball. Beckham was the shortstop for the Griffin junior varsity baseball team as an eighth grader, and the varsity team at Griffin High School in 2005 as a freshman. His older brother Jeremy had gone on to play baseball at Georgia Southern University and was eventually drafted by the Rays in the 2008 Major League Baseball draft.

== High school ==
In his freshman year for the Griffin High varsity team, Beckham batted seventh in the order and hit 14 home runs on the season. In his first at-bat in 2006 as a sophomore, Beckham hit a home run. For the season he batted .405, hitting five home runs, three triples and six doubles. He also added 22 runs batted in and stole 15 bases.

During his junior season at Griffin, Beckham batted .512, hitting nine doubles, six triples, and six home runs. He also added 39 RBIs and stole 20 bases. Following the season, Beckham competed in the World Wood Bat Association 17-Under Summer Championship, in Cincinnati, Ohio. Beckham finished the tournament rated as the #1 prospect out of over 2,000 participants. Later that year, in August 2007, Beckham took home the MVP Honors at the Aflac Classic in San Diego, California. Beckham concluded the summer of 2007 having batted .409, hitting nine home runs, 15 doubles, eight triples, and 32 stolen bases, against some of the best competition in America.

Beckham committed to the University of Southern California during his senior year, but maintained his intentions of entering the 2008 MLB draft. Through 24 games in his senior season, Beckham batted .500 with five home runs, nine doubles, and three triples. Beckham also added 31 RBIs and 16 stolen bases.

Beckham was rated Baseball America as the top high school baseball prospect. He was described as a potential five tool player at the major league level. Beckham ran the 60-yard dash in 6.33 seconds, and bench pressed 200 pounds (91 kg).

== Professional career ==
=== Tampa Bay Rays ===
==== Draft and minor leagues ====
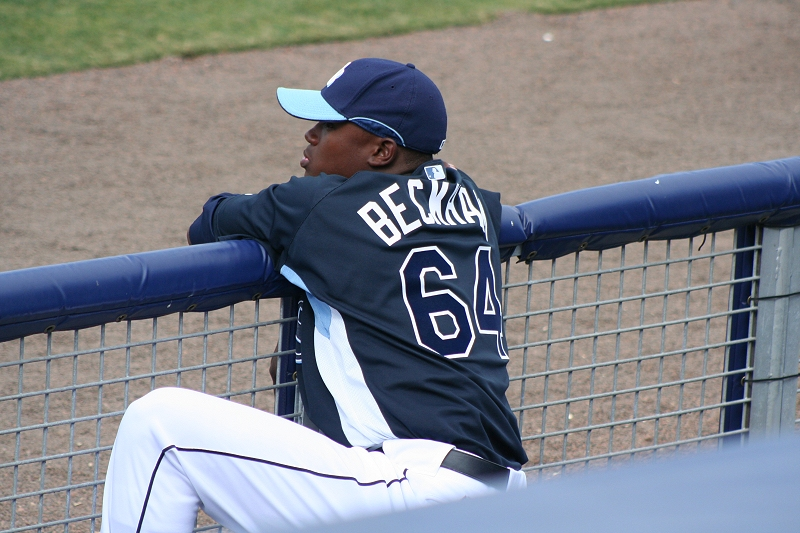
Beckham in 2009 spring training

The Tampa Bay Rays chose Beckham with the first overall selection of the 2008 MLB draft. Beckham signed with the Rays on June 19, receiving a signing bonus of $6.15 million. He played with the Princeton Rays of the Appalachian League, the Hudson Valley Renegades, the Bowling Green Hot Rods of the Midwest League, and the Charlotte Stone Crabs of the Florida State League.

In 2011, Beckham was selected to the All-Star Futures Game along with fellow Tampa Bay Rays prospects Hak-Ju Lee and Matt Moore.

In May 2012, Beckham was suspended 50 games for a second positive test for a "drug of abuse".

After the conclusion of the 2012 season, Beckham was added to the 40-man roster to be protected from the upcoming Rule 5 draft. He was optioned to AAA Durham on March 15, 2013.

==== Major leagues ====
On September 18, 2013, the Rays promoted Beckham to the majors. He made his MLB debut on September 19, as a pinch hitter against the Texas Rangers. In his only at-bat, he recorded his first career MLB hit, a single off of Tanner Scheppers. He had 3 hits, all singles, in 7 at-bats. He scored once and drove in a run.

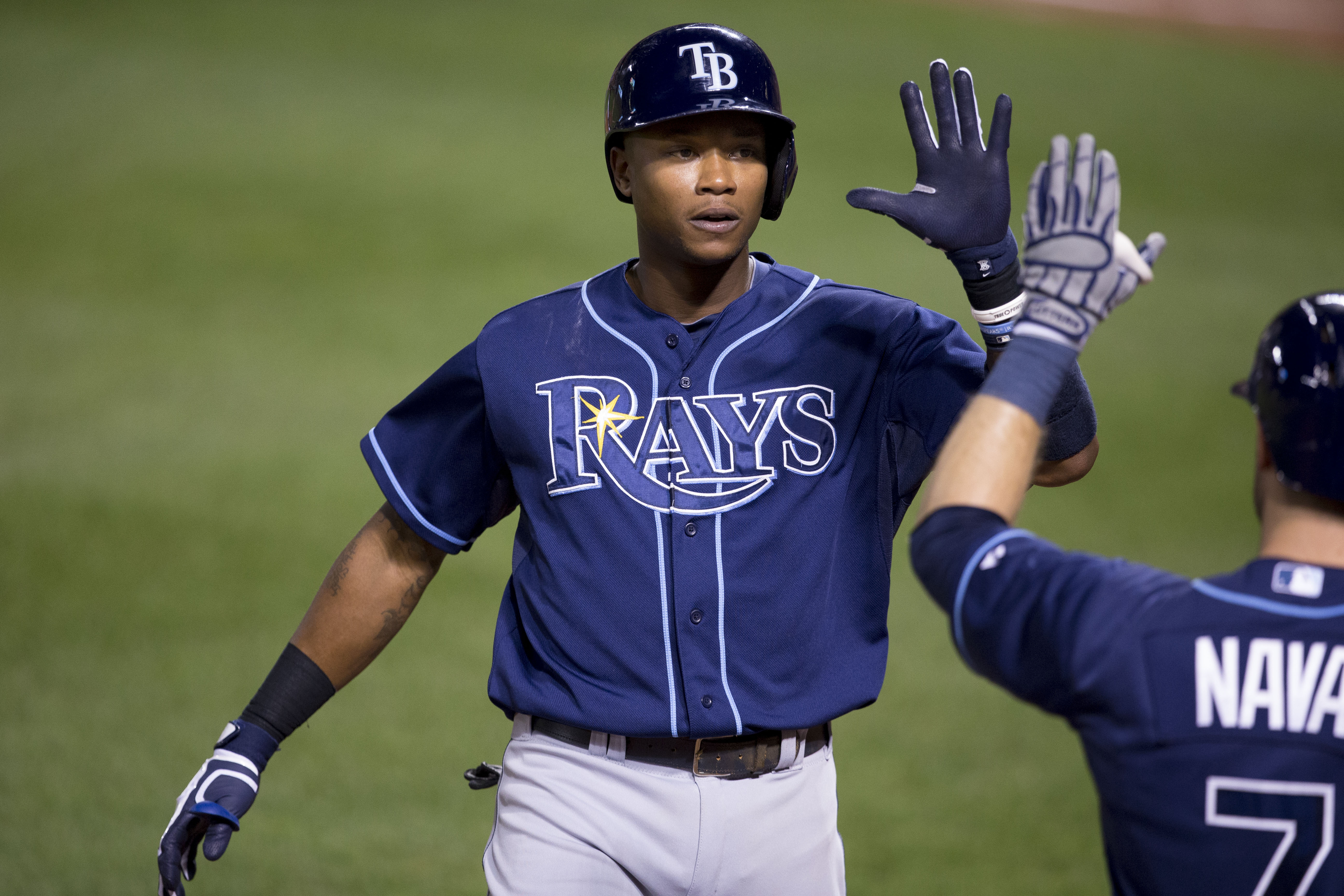
Beckham with the Tampa Bay Rays in 2015

After the 2013 season, Beckham tore his anterior cruciate ligament. He missed the 2014 season.

On April 11, 2015, Beckham hit his first major league home run. For the season, he batted .222/.274/.429.

In 2016, Beckham played a backup utility man role, mainly playing shortstop, but also seeing time at all four infield positions. Beckham was demoted to Triple-A Durham on August 31, 2016, after not hustling home from second base during a game against the Boston Red Sox at Fenway Park. He finished the season batting .247/.300/.434, with 5 home runs and 16 RBIs in 64 games.

In spring training in 2017, Beckham worked on playing in the outfield in an attempt to give him more playing time and a more important platoon role. Due to an injury to newly acquired shortstop Matt Duffy, Beckham's playing time at shortstop increased, including starting on Opening Day. Beckham started in a majority of the Rays games. This led Beckham to a minor break out. Batting .266/.303/.422 with 8 home runs, 26 RBIs through the first two months. Even with his improved play, Beckham was expected to relinquish his starting role upon Duffy's return. Upon the acquisition of defensive standout Adeiny Hechavarria, Beckham shifted over to second base He committed 20 errors for the season, the second-most among all American League (AL) players.

=== Baltimore Orioles ===
The Rays dealt Beckham to the Baltimore Orioles for Tobias Myers at trade deadline on July 31, 2017. He made his Orioles debut the next night, going 2-for-4 with a double and two runs scored. On August 5, in a 5–2 victory over the Tigers, Beckham homered for the third straight game. His home run was the 10,000th in Orioles' franchise history. Through his first five games with the Orioles, Beckham was 13-for-20, an average of .650, with three home runs, five RBIs, and an OPS of 2.000. Beckham was named AL Player of the Week.

Beckham went on a 12-game hitting streak to begin his career with the Orioles, before going 0-for-4 on August 13. During the hitting streak, Beckham slashed .531/.549/.939 with seven doubles, two triples, three home runs, nine RBIs and 14 runs scored.

Beckham collected 50 hits in his first month with the Orioles, the second most in team history (Cal Ripken, 53). He hit in 27 of the 29 games and slashed .394/.417/.646 with ten doubles, two triples, and six home runs, while driving in 19 runs and scoring 27 times.

Prior to the 2018 MLB season, the Orioles announced that Beckham would be moved to third base while Manny Machado would be moved to shortstop. Beckham was placed on the 10-day DL on April 25 with a left groin strain, and he was transferred to the 60-day DL on May 13.

=== Seattle Mariners ===
On January 10, 2019, Beckham signed a one-year contract worth $1.75 million with the Seattle Mariners. He was named the Mariners' Opening Day shortstop, making his debut against the Oakland Athletics on March 20, 2019, in Tokyo, Japan. Beckham hit safely in 9 of his first 10 games to begin the season, in which he hit .410/477/.846 with 4 home runs and 11 RBI during that span. As a result, he was awarded the AL Player of the Week honors for the first week of the season. On August 6, Beckham received an 80-game suspension without pay after testing positive for Stanozolol, a performance-enhancing substance, in violation of MLB's Joint Drug Prevention and Treatment Program. This ended Beckham's season, finishing with a .237/.293/.461 (100 wRC+) slash line with 15 home runs and 47 RBIs. On December 2, Beckham was non-tendered by Seattle and became a free agent.

=== Chicago White Sox ===
After going unsigned for the 2020 season, on October 29, 2020, Beckham signed a minor league contract with the Chicago White Sox organization. Beckham spent the 2021 season with the Triple-A Charlotte Knights. He played in 45 games, hitting .279 with 11 home runs and 32 RBI's. He became a free agent following the season.

=== Minnesota Twins ===
On February 5, 2022, Beckham signed a minor league contract with the Minnesota Twins. After missing the first two months of the 2022 season with a strained left quadriceps, Beckham played for the St. Paul Saints. The Twins promoted him to the major leagues on July 30. On August 26, Beckham was designated for assignment. He cleared waivers and became a free agent on August 31.

== See also ==
- List of Major League Baseball players suspended for performance-enhancing drugs
