= Ryan Brett =

American baseball player (born 1991)

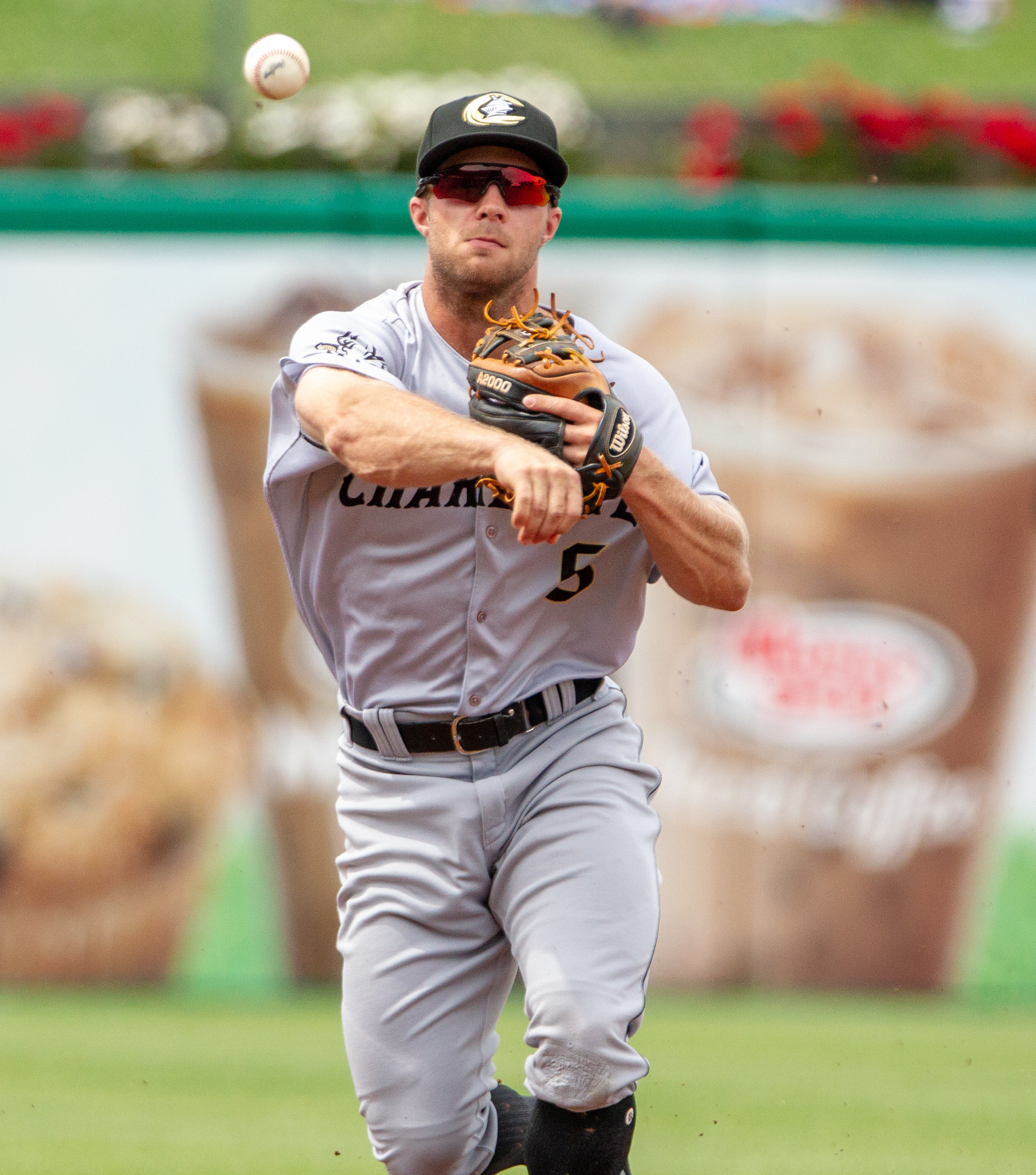
- Brett with the Charlotte Knights in 2018
- Second baseman
- Born: October 9, 1991 (age 34); Seattle, Washington, U.S.
- Batted: Right Threw: Right

MLB debut
- April 18, 2015, for the Tampa Bay Rays

Last MLB appearance
- April 21, 2015, for the Tampa Bay Rays

MLB statistics
- Batting average: .667
- Home runs: 0
- Runs batted in: 0
- Stats at Baseball Reference

Teams
- Tampa Bay Rays (2015)

Ryan Duane Brett (born October 9, 1991) is an American former professional baseball second baseman. He played in Major League Baseball (MLB) for the Tampa Bay Rays in 2015.

== Career ==
=== Tampa Bay Rays ===
Brett attended Highline High School in Burien, Washington. He was drafted by the Tampa Bay Rays in the third round of the 2010 Major League Baseball draft. Brett made his professional debut that season for the Gulf Coast League Rays. He played 2011 with the Princeton Rays and started 2012 with the Bowling Green Hot Rods. In August 2012, Brett along with two other Rays minor leaguers were suspended 50 games for testing positive for methamphetamine. He returned in 2013 and started the season with the Charlotte Stone Crabs. After hitting .340 he was promoted to the Montgomery Biscuits. He returned to Montgomery in 2014.

The Rays promoted Brett to the major leagues on April 18, 2015. In 3 games for Tampa Bay, he went 2-for-3 (.667) with a walk. Brett missed the entirety of the 2016 season with an elbow injury. On December 2, 2016, the Rays non-tendered Brett, making him a free agent.

On December 14, 2016, Brett re-signed with the Rays organization on a minor league contract. Brett played in only 20 games in 2017, splitting his time between Charlotte and the Triple–A Durham Bulls. In total, he accumulated a .284/.312/.473 batting line with 2 home runs, 5 RBI, and 4 stolen bases. Brett elected free agency following the season on November 6, 2017.

=== Chicago White Sox ===
On January 10, 2018, Brett signed a minor league contract with the Texas Rangers. He was released prior to the start of the season on March 6. On March 9, Brett signed a minor league contract with the Chicago White Sox. In 57 appearances split between the Double-A Birmingham Barons and Triple-A Charlotte Knights, he batted a combined .237/.266/.340 with three home runs, 15 RBI, and four stolen bases. Brett was released by the White Sox organization on August 1.

=== Kansas City T-Bones ===
On August 6, 2018, Brett signed with the Kansas City T-Bones of the American Association of Independent Professional Baseball. In 27 games down the stretch, he hit .336/.415/.434 with nine RBI and seven stolen bases. Brett was released by Kansas City on March 7, 2019.

However, Brett later re-signed with T-Bones on March 15, 2019. In 23 contests for the team, he batted .238/.297/.381 with two home runs, five RBI, and two stolen bases. Brett was released again by the team on June 22.

=== Cleburne Railroaders ===
On June 25, 2019, Brett signed with the Cleburne Railroaders of the American Association of Professional Baseball. In 63 appearances for Cleburne, Brett hit .257/.311/.406 with eight home runs, 28 RBI, and seven stolen bases.

=== Sioux Falls Canaries ===
On January 13, 2020, Cleburne traded Brett to the Sioux Falls Canaries of the American Association of Professional Baseball. In 40 appearances for the Canaries, he slashed .243/.283/.336 with one home run, 14 RBI, and three stolen bases. On January 20, 2021, Brett was released by the Canaries.
