= Danny Farquhar =

American baseball player (born 1987)

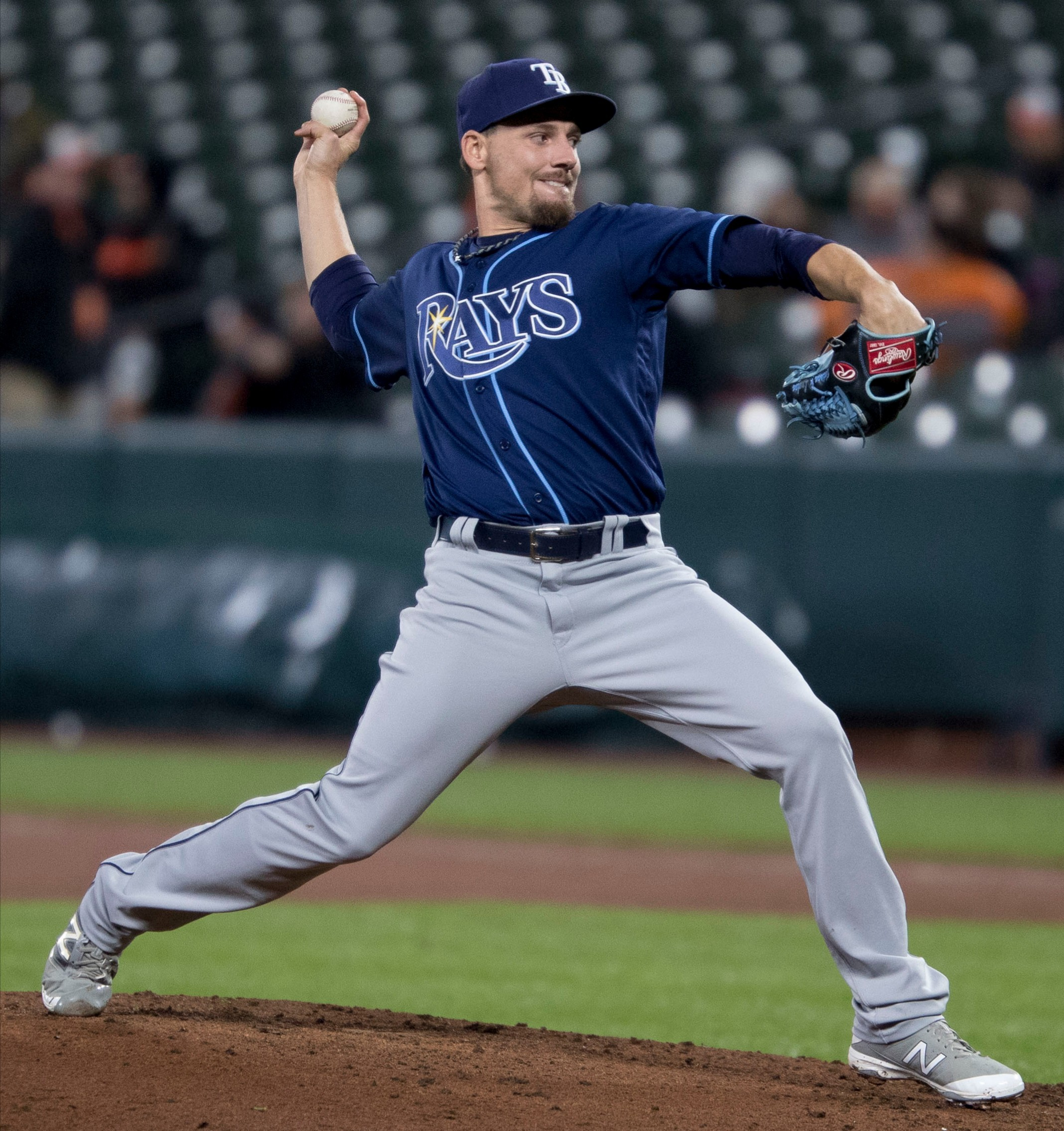
- Farquhar with the Tampa Bay Rays in April 2017

Seattle Mariners – No. 80
- Pitcher / Pitching coach
- Born: February 17, 1987 (age 39); Pembroke Pines, Florida, U.S.
- Batted: Right Threw: Right

MLB debut
- September 13, 2011, for the Toronto Blue Jays

Last MLB appearance
- April 20, 2018, for the Chicago White Sox

MLB statistics
- Win–loss record: 10–15
- Earned run average: 3.93
- Strikeouts: 309
- Stats at Baseball Reference

Teams
- As player: Toronto Blue Jays (2011); Seattle Mariners (2013–2015); Tampa Bay Rays (2016–2017); Chicago White Sox (2017–2018); As coach: Seattle Mariners (2024–present)

Daniel Andres Farquhar (/ˈfɑːrkwɑːr/ FAR-kwar; born February 17, 1987) is an American former professional baseball pitcher. He played for the Toronto Blue Jays, Seattle Mariners, Tampa Bay Rays, and Chicago White Sox in Major League Baseball (MLB) from 2011 to 2018. He had a brain aneurysm during his final MLB game. Farquhar is the assistant pitching coach for the Mariners.

== Amateur career ==
Farquhar attended Archbishop Edward A. McCarthy High School in Southwest Ranches, Florida, where he played for the school's baseball team as a pitcher and outfielder. He batted .436 as a sophomore. As an outfielder, he was named to the All-District Second Team in 2004, his junior year. As a senior, he had a 0.89 earned run average (ERA), setting a school record. He was teammates with future MLB catcher Alex Avila and threw a no-hitter to Avila in 2005.

Farquhar attended the University of Louisiana at Lafayette, where he played for the Louisiana Ragin' Cajuns baseball team. As a college freshman, he had a 6–1 win–loss record with four saves and a 2.17 ERA. He led the Sun Belt Conference in ERA. In 2007 as a sophomore, Farquhar went 6–3 with six saves, a 3.08 ERA and 115 strikeouts to 22 walks in 87 2/3 innings pitched. He was fourth in the conference in ERA and second in strikeouts. After the season, he played collegiate summer baseball in Massachusetts with the Harwich Mariners of the Cape Cod Baseball League. As a junior, he had a 3–8 record with a 4.95 ERA.

== Professional career ==
=== Toronto Blue Jays ===
The Toronto Blue Jays selected Farquhar in the tenth round, with the 309th overall selection of the 2008 MLB draft. After signing with Toronto, he made his professional debut with the Auburn Doubledays of the Low-A New York–Penn League. He was promoted to the Lansing Lugnuts of the Single-A Midwest League during the season. He finished 2008 with 2–2 win–loss record, 32 1/3 innings pitched (IP), and a 1.95 ERA. He began the 2009 season with the Dunedin Blue Jays of the High-A Florida State League and finished the season with the New Hampshire Fisher Cats of the Double-A Eastern League. In 2009, Farquhar had a 2–4 record, 1.87 ERA and 22 saves, in 62 2/3 innings pitched. He returned to the Fisher Cats in 2010, pitching to a 3.52 ERA while striking out 79 but walking 42 in 76 2/3 innings. He pitched in the Arizona Fall League after the season.

=== Oakland Athletics ===
On November 18, 2010, the Blue Jays traded Farquhar to the Oakland Athletics along with Trystan Magnuson in exchange for outfielder Rajai Davis. Farquhar threw eight innings without allowing a run for the Sacramento River Cats of the Triple-A Pacific Coast League (PCL).

=== Toronto Blue Jays (second stint) ===
Farquhar was traded back to the Toronto Blue Jays in exchange for reliever David Purcey on April 18, 2011. The Blue Jays assigned him to the Las Vegas 51s of the PCL. Farquhar made his major league debut on September 13, against the Boston Red Sox. He pitched 2/3 of an inning and allowed three earned runs on three hits and two walks.

Farquhar made 20 appearances for the Double-A New Hampshire Fisher Cats to begin the 2012 season, registering an 0-1 record and 2.97 ERA with 33 strikeouts and one save across 30 1/3 innings pitched. On June 2, 2012, Farquhar was designated for assignment after Toronto claimed pitcher Chris Schwinden off waivers.

=== Oakland Athletics (second stint) ===
On June 9, 2012, the Athletics claimed Farquhar off waivers from the Blue Jays. After making five appearances in the minor leagues for the Sacramento River Cats, the Athletics waived him on June 24 picking up the contract of A.J. Griffin.

=== New York Yankees ===
The New York Yankees claimed Farquhar off waivers on June 26, 2012 and optioned him to the Double-A Trenton Thunder. However, he was placed on waivers three days later, as the Yankees claimed Schwinden, who had been waived by the Cleveland Indians. Farquhar was outrighted to Trenton on July 1 and promoted to the Triple-A Scranton/Wilkes-Barre RailRiders on July 19.

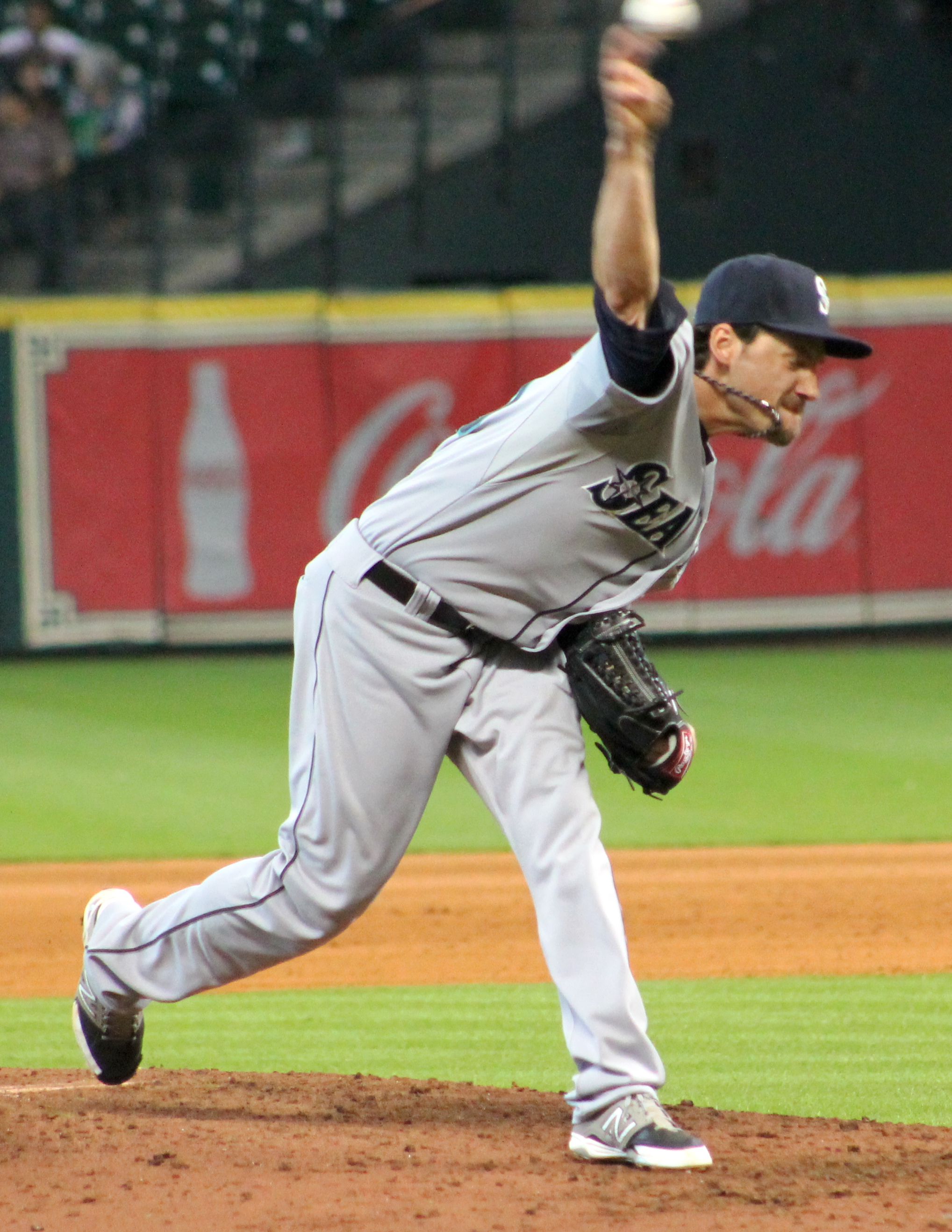
Farquhar pitching in Houston for the Seattle Mariners, July 2014

=== Seattle Mariners ===
On July 23, 2012, the Yankees traded Farquhar and pitcher D.J. Mitchell to the Seattle Mariners for right fielder Ichiro Suzuki. Farquhar started the 2013 season with the Tacoma Rainiers of the PCL. The Mariners purchased his contract, promoting him to the major leagues on May 17. On August 2, Farquhar replaced Tom Wilhelmsen as closer, and he recorded his first major league save on August 3 against Baltimore. From that point until the end of the season, he went 0–3 with 16 saves in 24 games, striking out 29 in 22 2/3 innings with a 2.38 ERA. Overall on the year, he went 0–3 with a 4.20 ERA in 46 appearances, striking out 79 in 55 2/3 innings.

In 2014, Farquhar returned to a setup role behind new closer Fernando Rodney. Farquhar was 3–1 with 1 save, a 2.66 ERA, and 81 strikeouts in 71 innings pitched. Farquhar and Rodney both fell off in 2015, with Farquhar posting a 1–8 record, one save, and 5.12 ERA in 41 innings.

=== Tampa Bay Rays ===
On November 5, 2015, the Mariners traded Farquhar, Brad Miller, and Logan Morrison to the Tampa Bay Rays for Nate Karns, C. J. Riefenhauser, and Boog Powell.

On April 23, 2016, Farquhar was sent down to the Durham Bulls of the Triple-A International League. He was recalled on May 14, but was designated for assignment the next day and was back with Durham on May 16. On June 25, he was back with the Rays, but one day later, he was sent down again to Durham. After one day, on June 27, he was called back up to the Rays.

This time Farquhar made it 8 days before his July 5 demotion back to Durham. On August 6, he was called back up to the Rays, his final move of the season. He finished the season with a 3.06 ERA and 46 strikeouts in 35 games (35 1/3 innings) for the Rays. Farquhar was designated for assignment on June 29, 2017. He cleared waivers and was assigned to Durham. The Rays released him on July 20.

=== Chicago White Sox ===
On July 24, 2017, Farquhar signed a minor league contract with the Chicago White Sox. His contract was purchased by the White Sox on August 19.

==== Astros sign stealing ====
In a game on September 21, 2017, against the Houston Astros, Farquhar made a pitching appearance in the 8th inning against Astros hitter Evan Gattis. During the at bat, Farquhar noticed banging from within the Astros dugout every time the catcher called for any pitch other than a fastball. Eventually, he and catcher Kevan Smith made a mound visit because of it and afterwards Gattis was struck out after a pitch without a sign being called. The incident would become part of the investigation of the Houston Astros sign stealing scandal.

==== 2018 brain hemorrhage ====
On April 20, 2018, after pitching in relief in the sixth inning in a game against the Houston Astros, Farquhar collapsed in the dugout. Witnesses saw him go into the White Sox's dugout and vomit before losing consciousness. Farquhar was carried out by ambulance and taken to Rush University Medical Center. Teammates said they were shocked because they did not "notice any signs that Farquhar might have been sick." After further testing, doctors revealed Farquhar suffered from a brain hemorrhage which was caused by a ruptured brain aneurysm. On May 7, Farquhar was discharged from the hospital. Despite being ruled out for the rest of the 2018 season, Demetrius Klee Lopes and other doctors expected him to make a full recovery and pitch again. On June 1, he had recovered enough to throw the ceremonial first pitch for the White Sox's game against the Milwaukee Brewers. On October 26, Farquhar was removed from the 40-man roster and sent outright to Triple-A. He elected free agency after the season.

=== New York Yankees (second stint) ===
On January 21, 2019, Farquhar signed a minor league contract with the Yankees. The Yankees assigned him to Triple-A Scranton/Wilkes-Barre, where he allowed seven runs in three innings pitched in two games. The Yankees released him on June 19. On August 1, he announced that he was retiring on his Instagram.

== Coaching career ==
=== Chicago White Sox ===
In January 2020, the Chicago White Sox named Farquhar the pitching coach of the High-A Winston-Salem Dash. After coaching the Dash in 2021 and 2022, he was promoted to the pitching coach of the Double-A Birmingham Barons for the 2023 season.

=== Seattle Mariners ===
On January 10, 2024, Farquhar was hired as a pitching strategist and assistant pitching coach on the Seattle Mariners' major league coaching staff. He got the job after calling Mariners general manager Jerry Dipoto about the team's vacant bullpen coach job.

== Personal life ==
Farquhar is married to his high school sweetheart. They have a daughter and two sons. Off the field, he enjoys golf. He said in 2013, that he would like to coach high school baseball and teach high school math.

Farquhar's sister was a cheerleader at the University of Florida. Farquhar ran cross country in high school.
