= Logan Morrison =

American baseball player (born 1987)

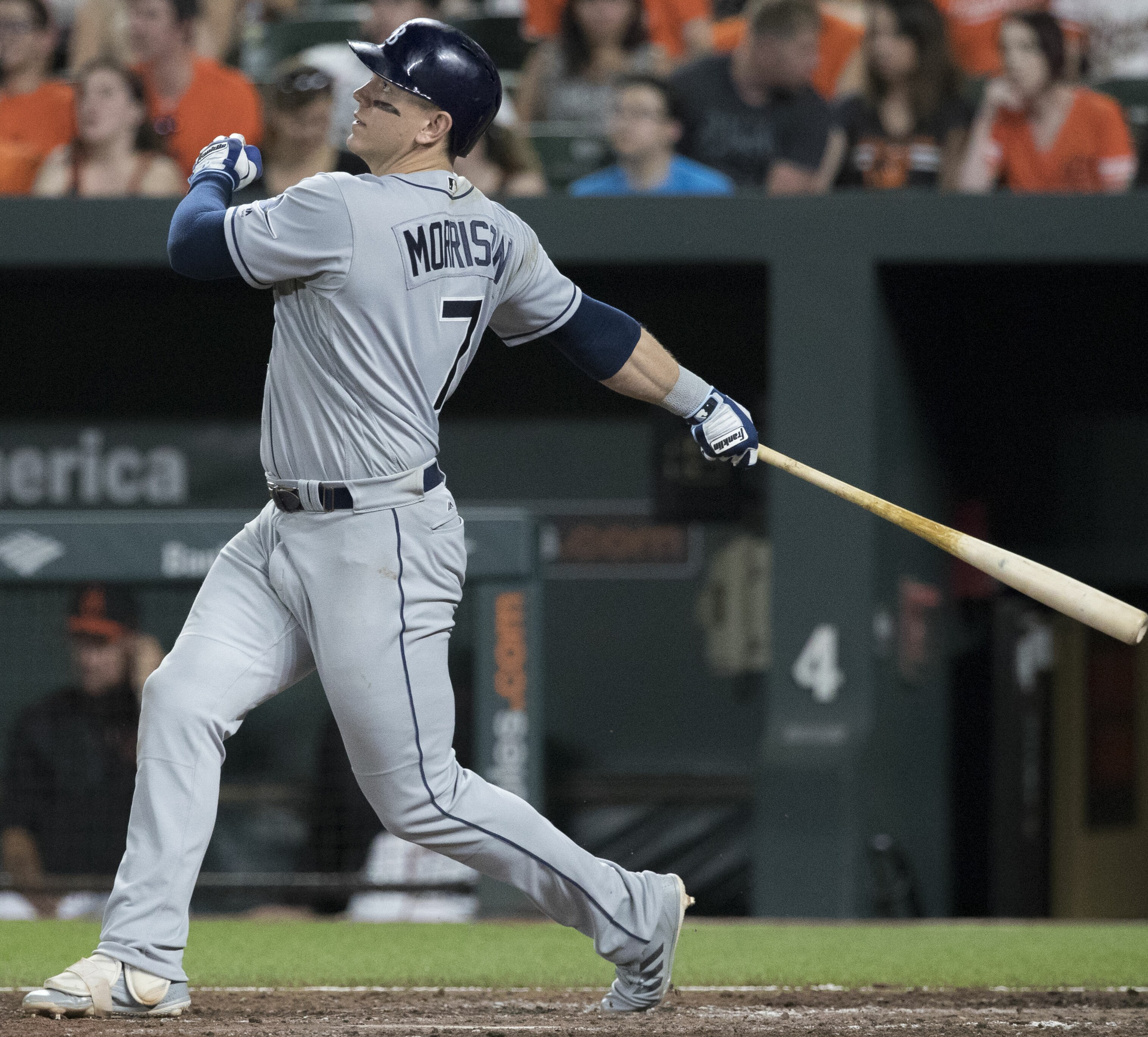
- Morrison with the Tampa Bay Rays in 2017
- First baseman / Left fielder
- Born: August 25, 1987 (age 39); Kansas City, Missouri, U.S.
- Batted: Left Threw: Left

MLB debut
- July 27, 2010, for the Florida Marlins

Last MLB appearance
- August 9, 2020, for the Milwaukee Brewers

MLB statistics
- Batting average: .238
- Home runs: 140
- Runs batted in: 426
- Stats at Baseball Reference

Teams
- Florida / Miami Marlins (2010–2013); Seattle Mariners (2014–2015); Tampa Bay Rays (2016–2017); Minnesota Twins (2018); Philadelphia Phillies (2019); Milwaukee Brewers (2020)

Justis Logan Morrison (born August 25, 1987), nicknamed "LoMo", is an American former professional baseball first baseman and left fielder. He played in Major League Baseball (MLB) for the Florida/Miami Marlins, Seattle Mariners, Tampa Bay Rays, Minnesota Twins, Philadelphia Phillies and Milwaukee Brewers. He was the 2008 Florida State League MVP, and played in the 2010 All-Star Futures Game. Entering the 2010 baseball season, Morrison was considered by Baseball America to be the #2 prospect in the Florida Marlins farm system, and the #20 overall prospect. That season he made his major league debut with the Marlins.

== Early life and amateur career ==
Morrison was born in Kansas City, Missouri, and moved around a lot with his father, who served as a chief petty officer during his 28-year United States Coast Guard career. Morrison has also lived in Wilmington, North Carolina; Key West, Florida; Newport News, Virginia, and Slidell, Louisiana. His father played defensive end at the University of Kansas in the 1970s.

Morrison was drafted after his senior year (2005) at Northshore High School in Slidell, Louisiana, by the Florida Marlins in the 22nd round, but decided to attend Maple Woods (MO) Community College, and was signed as a draft-and-follow prior to the 2006 Major League Baseball draft. In his freshman year, Morrison batted .436/.532/.743 for the MCC-Maple Woods Monarchs with 9 home runs and 45 RBIs in 140 at bats.

== Professional career ==
=== Florida/Miami Marlins ===
In 2007, Morrison batted .268/.343/.483 with 24 home runs (4th in the league), 86 RBIs, 71 runs scored, and 22 doubles in 128 games played for the Greensboro Grasshoppers. In June he was named the Marlins' Organizational Hitter of the Month. He was named a South Atlantic League Mid-Season All-Star.

In 2008, Morrison batted .332/.402/.494 with 13 home runs, 74 RBIs, and 38 doubles for the Class High A Jupiter Hammerheads. He led the Florida State League in batting average (.332), hits (162), doubles (38), and OBP (.402), and was 2nd in total bases (241), 6th in RBIs (74), tied for 6th in home runs (13), 7th in runs (71), and tied for 8th in walks (57). He was named Florida State League MVP, was league Player of the Week on June 16 and August 4, was TOPPS league Player of the Month for July, was named a Baseball America High Class A All Star and Baseball America Minor League All Star, and was both a mid-season and a postseason All Star, was a Baseball America First Team Minor League All Star, was ranked the #3 prospect in the FSL by Baseball America, and was named the Best Hitter for Average in the Marlins organization by Baseball America. He finished 4th in the Florida State League in at bats (488), 4th in OPS (.896), and 5th in SLG% (.494). He then played for the Mesa Solar Sox in the Arizona Fall League. There, he batted .404 (3rd in the league), was on the All Prospect Team, was named a Rising Star, and was Player of the Week on November 3.

A broken bone in his right thumb limited Morrison to 79 games at Double-A in 2009, where he batted .277/.411 (7th-best in the league)/.442 with 8 home runs, 47 RBIs, and 18 doubles.

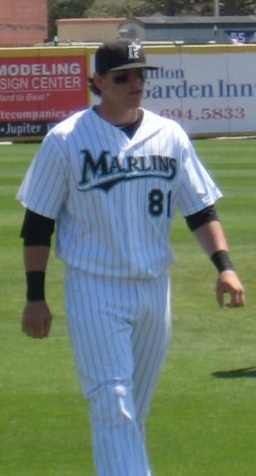
Morrison during his tenure with the Florida Marlins in 2010

In 2010, Morrison played for the Jupiter Hammerheads and New Orleans Zephyrs. He was an MiLB.com Florida Organization All Star, and an All-Star Futures Game selection. On July 27, 2010, the Florida Marlins called up Morrison to replace the injured Chris Coghlan. He went 1–4 that night as the starting left fielder, recording his first major league hit in his debut. Morrison wore number 20 his first 2 years in Florida, before switching to number 5 in 2012 when the Marlins changed their name from Florida to Miami. In 2010 in the major leagues, playing left field he batted .283/.390/.447 with 2 home runs and 18 RBIs in 244 at bats, and was 8th in the National League in triples, with 7.

On August 13, 2011, Morrison was optioned back to New Orleans. Ten days later, he was called back up to the majors. In his first at bat, he hit a home run. On September 15, 2011, Morrison filed a grievance against the Marlins for what he said was an unfair demotion to the minors. In 2011 in the majors, at 23 years of age in his first full season, playing almost exclusively left field, he batted .247/.330/.468 with 23 home runs and 72 RBIs in at 462 bats.

On February 11, 2012, Morrison switched to uniform number 5. The number had been retired for the entirety of the Marlins' existence in honor of the late Carl Barger, the team's founding president and chief operating officer. (Barger's favorite player had been Joe DiMaggio, whose number 5 was retired by the New York Yankees.) Morrison requested the number in honor of his late father, who had encouraged Morrison to model his career after Hall of Famer George Brett, whose number 5 was retired by the Kansas City Royals. Several subsequent Marlins players wore the number 5 after Morrison.

On May 22, 2012, Morrison was moved to first base after the Marlins sent teammate Gaby Sánchez to Triple-A. He had played first base before playing left field. On June 10, 2012, Morrison was moved back to left field after the Marlins called Sanchez back up. He played 21 games at first, with a fielding percentage of .994 and one error, and 59 games in left field. In 2012 he batted .230/.308/.399 with 11 home runs and 36 RBIs in 296 at bats. His season ended early due to right knee inflammation, and he underwent surgery to repair his patella tendon. In 2012, Morrison was the Marlins' nominee for the Roberto Clemente Award, given to a player who shows outstanding commitment to helping others both on and off the field.

In 2013 he batted .242/.333/.375 with 6 home runs and 36 RBIs in 293 at bats, while playing first base.

=== Seattle Mariners ===
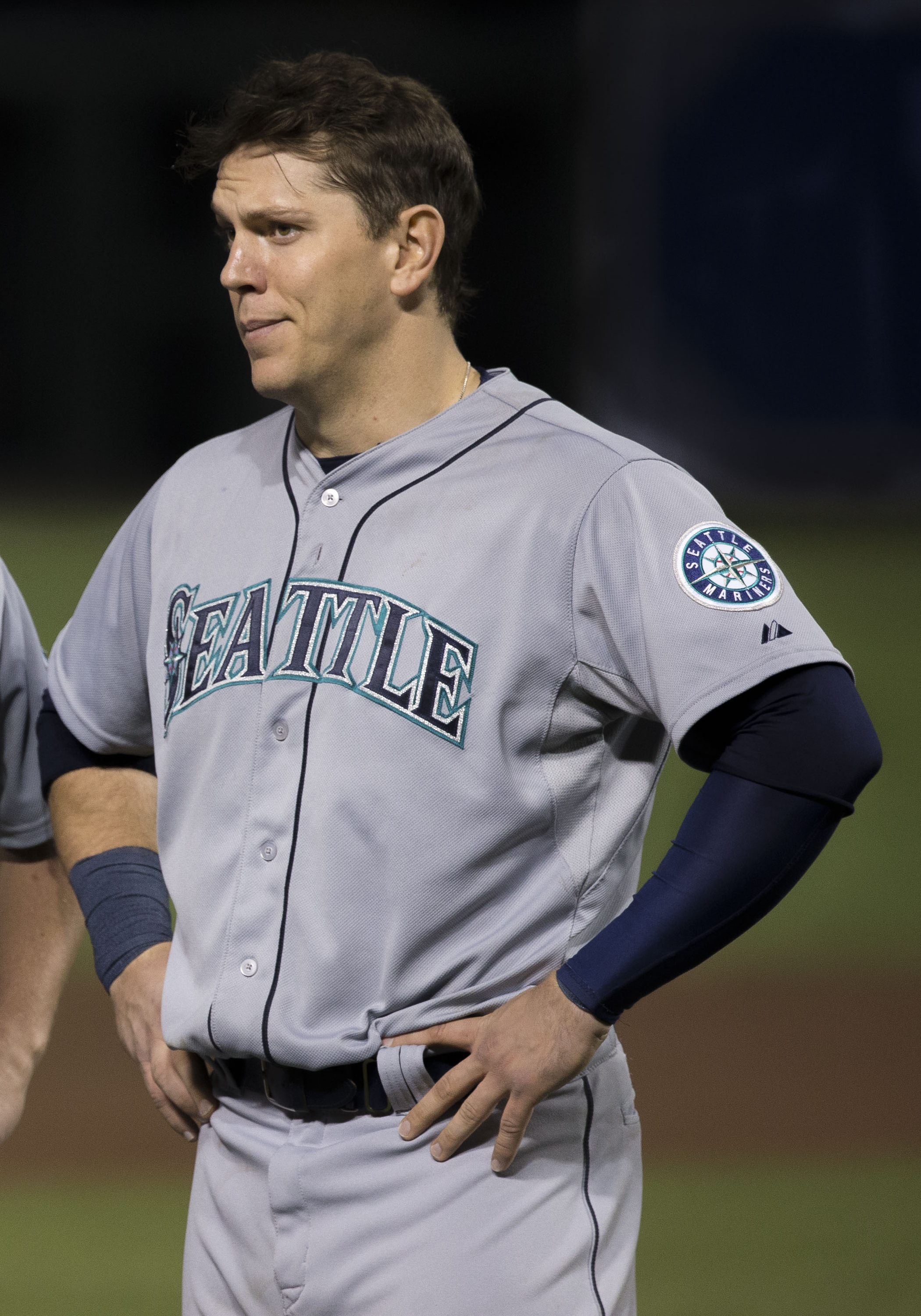
Morrison with the Seattle Mariners in 2015

On December 13, 2013, the Marlins traded Morrison to the Seattle Mariners for pitcher Carter Capps. He reverted to wearing number 20 during his tenure with the Mariners. Morrison played in just eight games before sustaining a hamstring injury, causing him to miss nearly two months of the season. On June 11, he was activated from the disabled list, and immediately took over the first base role vacated by Justin Smoak, who went down with an injury. In 99 games in 2014, Morrison hit .262/.315/.420 while finishing with 11 home runs and 38 RBIs in 336 at bats. Over the final two months of the season (49 games), he hit .321/.375/.512 with 6 home runs and 20 RBIs, solidifying his role as the Mariners' first baseman heading into 2015. Smoak was allowed to leave the club via waivers, and Morrison avoided arbitration with Seattle for $2.725 million.

Morrison appeared in 146 games and 457 at bats for Seattle in 2015, with 115 starts at first base. He hit .225/.302/.383 with 17 home runs and 54 RBIs, with a wRC+ of 90, a significant dropoff from his 2014 value of 111. His fielding percentage of .996 was identical from 2014 to 2015, but his Defensive Runs Saved total of -7 was worse in 2015 than his 0 total in 2014. Morrison also struggled against left-handed pitchers in 2015, hitting .190 with a 19.4 percent strikeout rate, both marks worse than his .241 average and 14.3 percent strikeout rate against righties.

=== Tampa Bay Rays ===
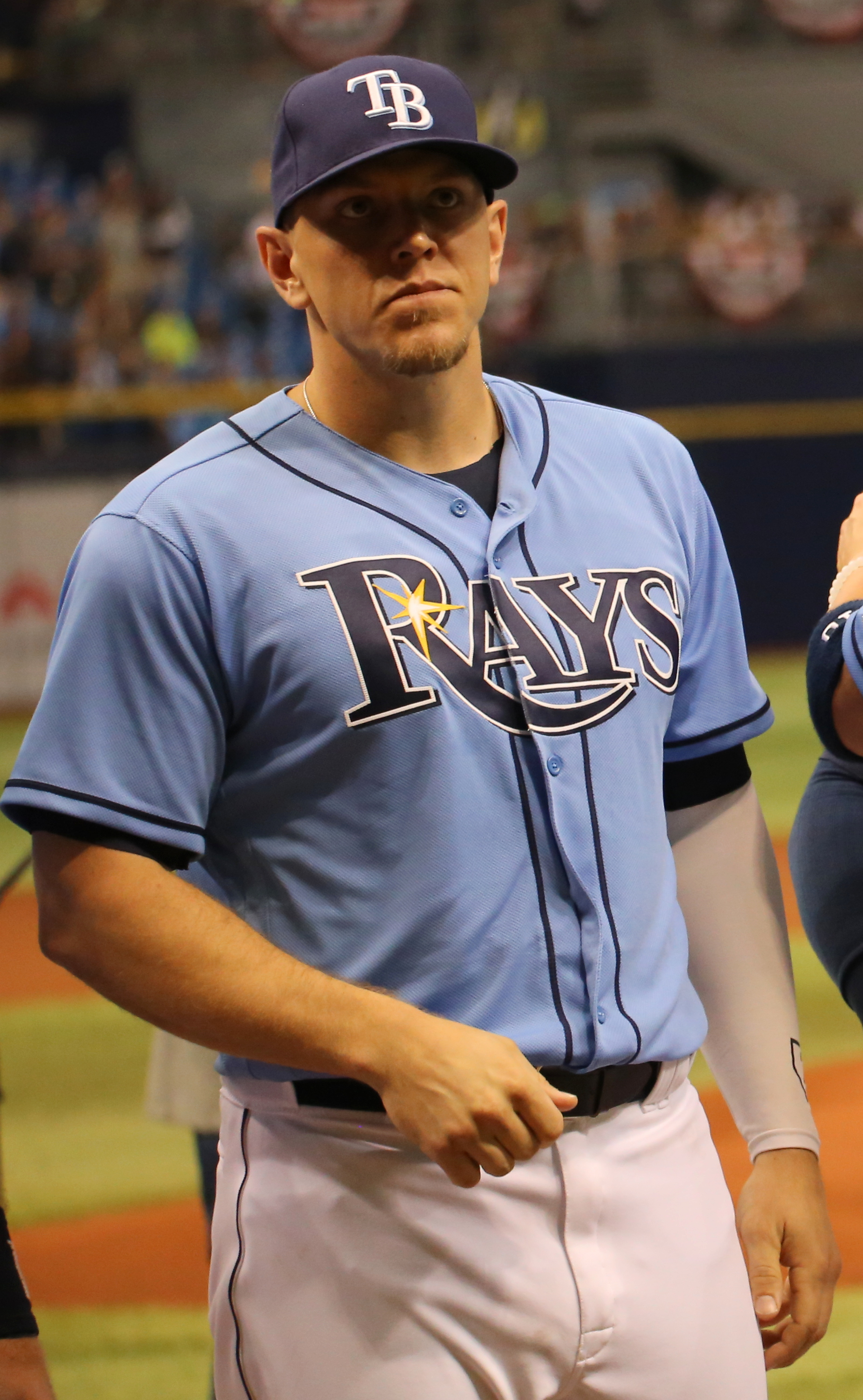
Morrison during his tenure with the Tampa Bay Rays in 2016

On November 5, 2015, Morrison, Brad Miller, and Danny Farquhar were traded to the Tampa Bay Rays for Nathan Karns, C. J. Riefenhauser, and Boog Powell.

Morrison wore number 7 with the Rays. Having supplanted incumbent first baseman James Loney with a solid spring training, Morrison began 2016 with the lion's share of starts at first base, with utility man Steve Pearce as his platoon-mate. He appeared in 107 games in his first season in Tampa Bay, making 78 starts at first base, and 17 as designated hitter. For the 2016 season he hit .238/.319/.414 with 14 home runs and 43 RBIs in 353 at bats, striking out in a career-high 22.4% of his plate appearances. Morrison played his final game of the season on September 11, as a torn left wrist sheath injury requiring surgery cut his season short. Of the 95 starts he made, only 11 came against left-handed pitchers, and as a whole, Morrison hit .258 (16–62) against lefties while benefiting from a .341 BAbip, compared to his overall BAbip of .278. After the 2016 season, he became a free agent. On February 6, 2017, Morrison signed a one-year contract worth $2.5 million to remain with the Rays for the 2017 season.

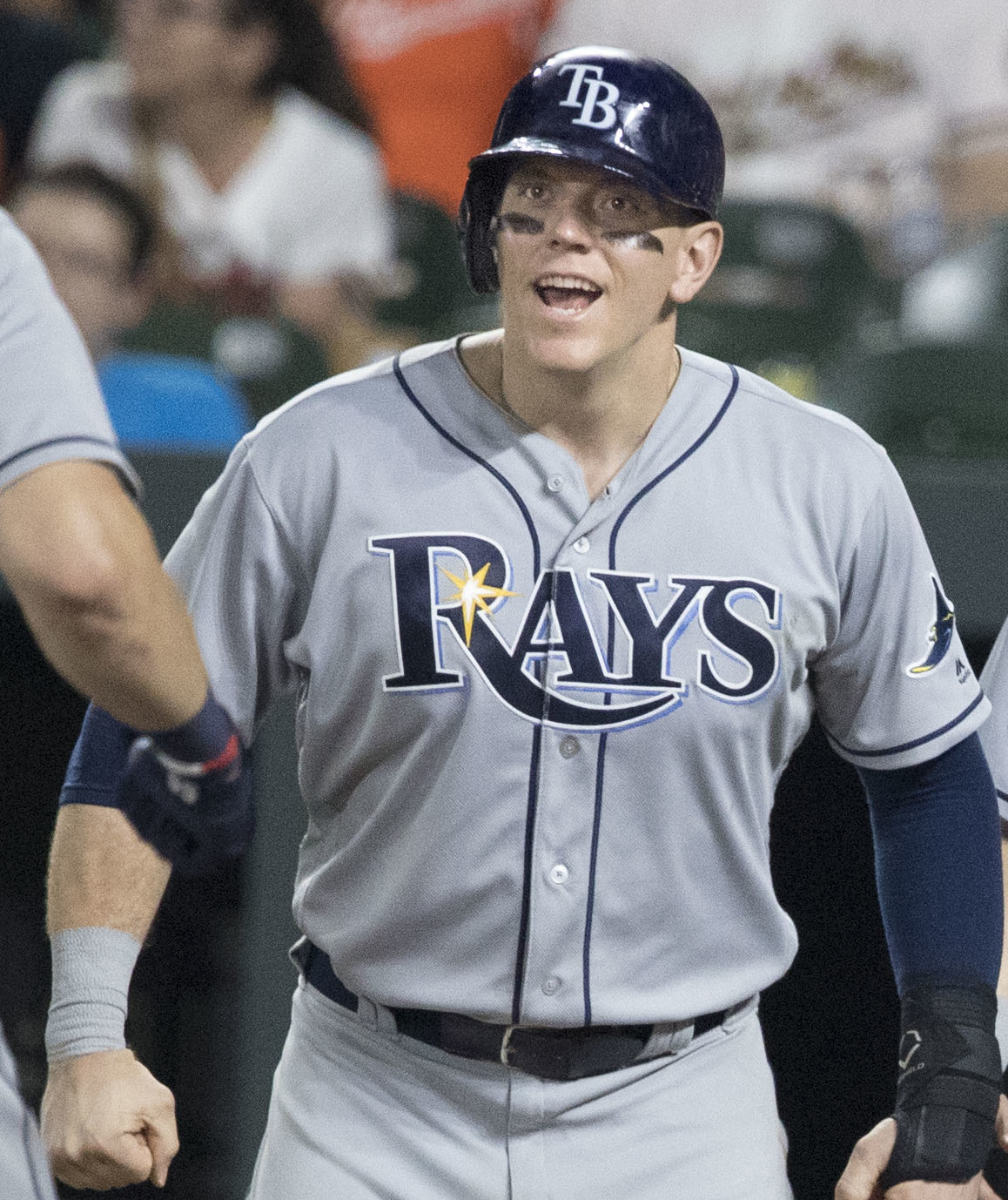
Morrison during his tenure with the Tampa Bay Rays in 2017

Morrison showed improved power and situational hitting in 2017, becoming the everyday first baseman, instead of the original plan of platooning with right-handed hitter Rickie Weeks Jr. On May 22, Morrison hit his 12th home run of the year; on that day in the 2016 season, Morrison hit his first of the year. On May 31, he hit his 15th home run of the year, passing his 2016 total of 14. On July 1, Morrison hit his 23rd and 24th home runs against Dylan Bundy, passing his career high. After being snubbed by the Home Run Derby and missing out on the All-Star vote, Morrison was left out of the All-Star festivities in 2017. He voiced his displeasure with the Home Run Derby selections by criticizing Gary Sánchez, who had 13 home runs and was the final player allowed in the derby, saying, "I remember when I had 14 home runs ... that was a month and a half ago." Morrison became only the second player in history with 24 or more home runs at the All-Star Break not to be selected. In 2017 he batted .246/.353/.516 with 85 RBIs and was 4th in the American League in intentional walks (with 8), 5th in home runs (38; a career high, and 3rd-most in club history), 6th in at bats per home run (13.5), and 8th in walks (81) in 512 at bats, while playing first base. He hit a home run every 9.67 at bats in games on the road, the 9th-best rate in American League history.

=== Minnesota Twins ===
Morrison signed a one-year, $6.5 million contract with the Minnesota Twins on February 28, 2018. He became the first person in Twins history to wear number 99. For the 2018 season, he batted .186/.276/.368 with 15 home runs and 39 RBIs in 318 at bats, as he played through an injury. A labrum tear in his left hip ended his season early, in August, as he underwent surgery. The Twins declined his 2019 contract option on October 30, 2018, making him a free agent.

=== New York Yankees ===
On April 19, 2019, Morrison signed a minor league deal with the New York Yankees. Playing in AAA for the Scranton/Wilkes-Barre RailRiders, he batted .289/.341/.658 with 15 home runs and 37 RBIs in 152 at bats. On July 4, Morrison opted out of his contract and was released, making him a free agent.

=== Philadelphia Phillies ===
On July 13, 2019, Morrison signed a minor league deal with the Philadelphia Phillies. On August 14, the Phillies selected Morrison's contract. In 2019 with the Phillies Morrison batted .200/.263/.400 with two home runs and three RBIs in 35 at bats, which included 25 pinch hit opportunities.

=== Milwaukee Brewers ===
On January 9, 2020, Morrison signed a minor league deal with the Milwaukee Brewers. Morrison made the Opening Day roster for the Brewers. On August 10, 2020, Morrison was designated for assignment after going 3-for-28 with one home run in 9 games. He elected free agency on August 14, 2020.

=== High Point Rockers ===
On April 28, 2021, Morrison signed with the High Point Rockers of the Atlantic League of Professional Baseball. He hit .390 with three home runs and nine RBIs through the first nine games of the season.

=== Cincinnati Reds ===
On June 10, 2021, Morrison's contract was purchased by the Cincinnati Reds. He hit .347 with 2 home runs in 16 games for the Triple-A Louisville Bats.

=== High Point Rockers (second stint) ===
On April 9, 2022, Morrison again signed with High Point. In 91 games he hit .283/.410/.512 with 15 home runs 54 RBIs and 3 stolen bases. He became a free agent following the season.

== Personal life ==
Morrison's father had lung cancer during Morrison's rookie season, and died on December 8, 2010, at 52 years of age. Morrison pays tribute to his father with a Coast Guard salute to the skies every time he hits a home run. Morrison hosts an annual baseball camp in his father's honor with all proceeds benefiting the American Lung Association. Since the camp started in 2011, Morrison has raised over $300,000 for the American Lung Association. The third annual LoMo: Camp for a Cure took place on January 12–13, 2013.

Morrison was one of the first baseball players to gain popularity on Twitter, first gaining a large following during his first full season in the major leagues in 2011. After posting multiple controversial tweets in the years following, Morrison stopped using Twitter in August 2015.

Morrison and his wife Christie married in 2013. They have two children, a daughter who was born in September 2015 and a son who was born March 2019. They owned a home in Jupiter, Florida but sold it in 2020 for $745,000.
