= Nate Karns =

American baseball player (born 1987)

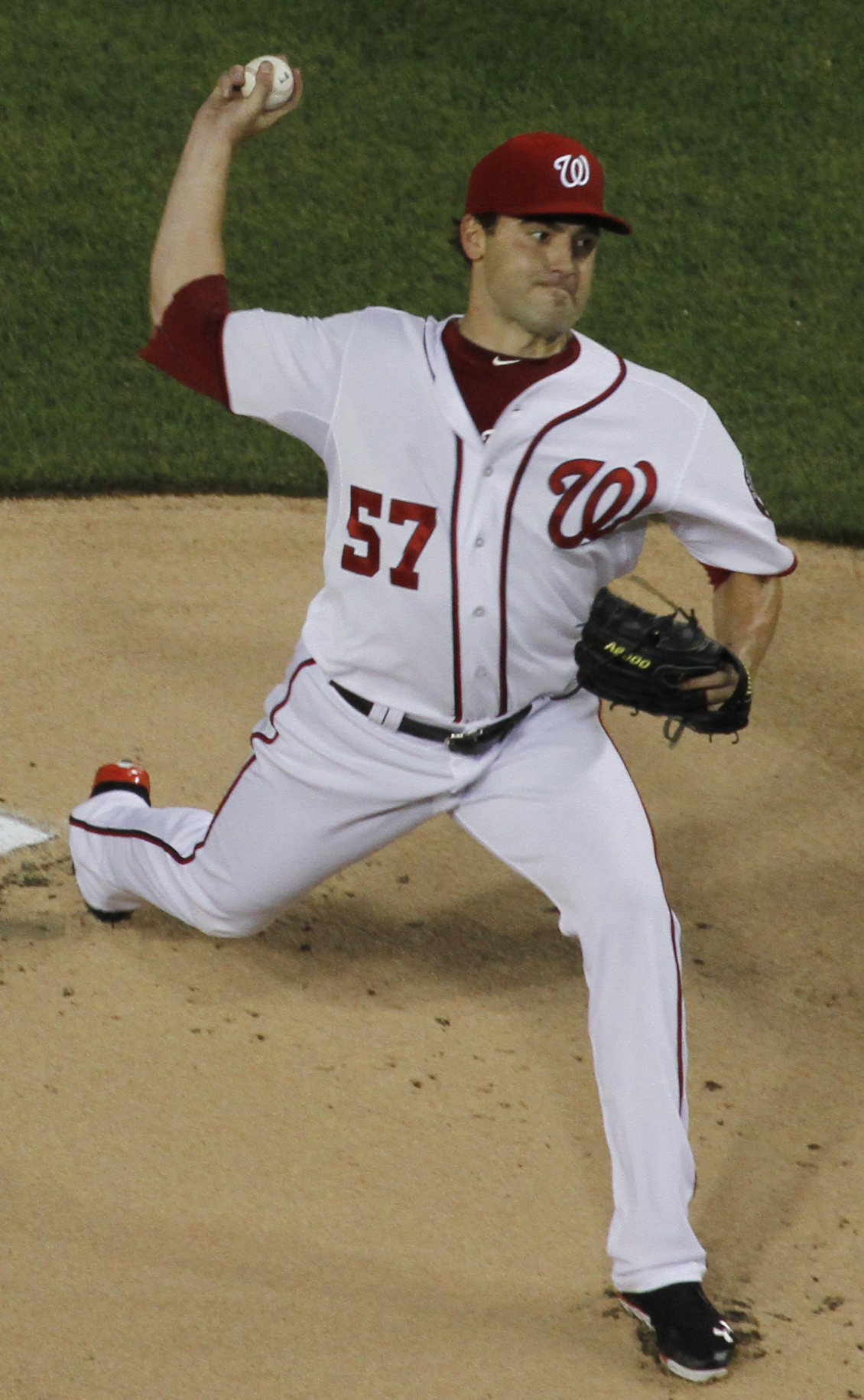
- Karns with the Washington Nationals
- Pitcher
- Born: November 25, 1987 (age 38); Franklin, Pennsylvania, U.S.
- Batted: Right Threw: Right

MLB debut
- May 28, 2013, for the Washington Nationals

Last MLB appearance
- April 8, 2019, for the Baltimore Orioles

MLB statistics
- Win–loss record: 16–12
- Earned run average: 4.30
- Strikeouts: 326
- Stats at Baseball Reference

Teams
- Washington Nationals (2013); Tampa Bay Rays (2014–2015); Seattle Mariners (2016); Kansas City Royals (2017); Baltimore Orioles (2019)

Nathan Alan Karns (born November 25, 1987) is an American former professional baseball pitcher. He played in Major League Baseball (MLB) for the Washington Nationals, Tampa Bay Rays, Seattle Mariners, Kansas City Royals, and Baltimore Orioles.

== Career ==
=== Amateur ===
Karns attended James W. Martin High School in Arlington, Texas, where he played for the school's baseball team. He enrolled at Texas Tech University, where he played college baseball for the Texas Tech Red Raiders baseball team. In 2008, he played collegiate summer baseball with the Falmouth Commodores of the Cape Cod Baseball League.

=== Washington Nationals ===
The Washington Nationals drafted Karns in the 12th round, with the 352nd overall selection, of the 2009 Major League Baseball draft. His professional career was delayed as he had shoulder surgery in 2010, and didn't make his professional debut until 2011.

In 2012, Karns began the year with the Single–A Hagerstown Suns, and then was promoted to the High–A Potomac Nationals. His combined record was 11–4, and was named the Nationals Minor Pitcher of the Year in 2012. On November 20, 2012, the Nationals added Karns to their 40-man roster to protect him from the Rule 5 draft.

When Ross Detwiler suffered an injury, Karns was called up to take his place in the pitching rotation, and made his major league debut on May 28, 2013. He started, and lasted 4 1/3 innings, allowing three earned runs, five hits, and two walks, in a game the Nationals won, 9–3.

=== Tampa Bay Rays ===
On February 13, 2014, Karns was traded to the Tampa Bay Rays in exchange for José Lobatón, Felipe Rivero and Drew Vettleson. Karns spent the majority of the season with the Triple–A Durham Bulls. He made two starts for the Rays in 2014, posting a 4.50 ERA with 14 strikeouts.

Due to numerous injuries to begin the 2015 season, the Rays gave Karns a rotation spot for Opening Day. On July 21, 2015, pitching against the Philadelphia Phillies in Philadelphia, Karns hit his first major league home run as the Rays defeated the Phillies, 1–0. It was the first time since 1962 that an American League pitcher had homered in a 1–0 game. Karns made 27 appearances (26 starts) for the Rays, averaging nine strikeouts per nine innings despite logging just under six innings per start. He compiled a 7–5 record and 3.67 ERA with 145 strikeouts across 147 innings.

=== Seattle Mariners ===
On November 5, 2015, the Rays traded Karns, C. J. Riefenhauser, and Boog Powell to the Seattle Mariners in exchange for Brad Miller, Danny Farquhar, and Logan Morrison.

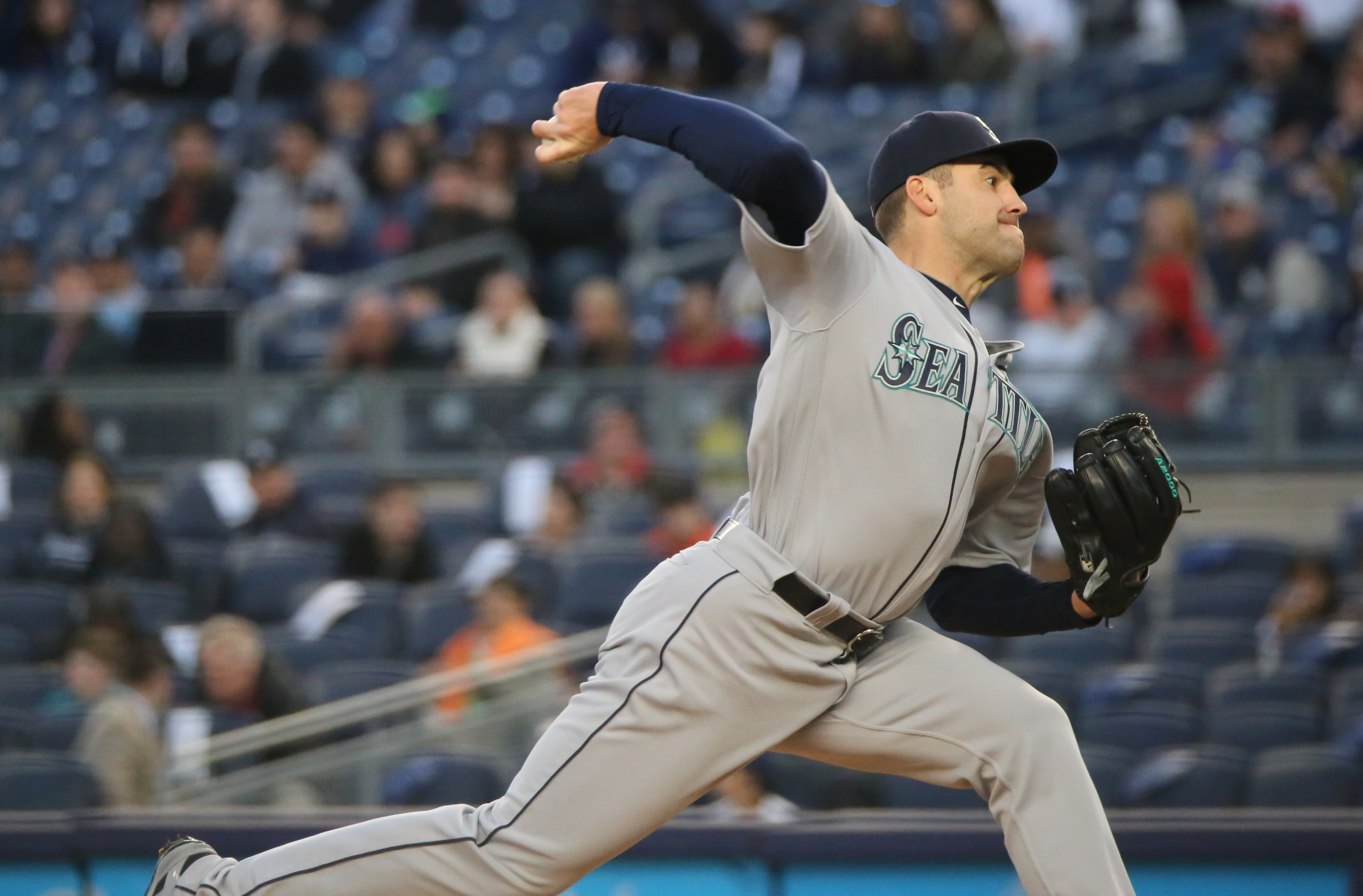
Karns pitching for the Seattle Mariners in the 2016 season

Karns began the season in Seattle's rotation but was then demoted to the bullpen after struggling. He made eight relief appearances before being shut down for the season in early August with a back strain. Karns finished the season with a 6–2 record, 5.15 ERA, and 101 strikeouts in 94 1/3 innings.

=== Kansas City Royals ===
On January 6, 2017, Karns was traded to the Kansas City Royals in exchange for Jarrod Dyson. His 2017 season with Kansas City was cut short due to injury, undergoing surgery for thoracic outlet syndrome in July. Karns finished the season 2–2 with a 4.17 ERA in nine games (eight starts). He missed the entire 2018 season with right elbow inflammation. Karns elected free agency after the Royals outrighted him to the minors on October 31, 2018.

=== Baltimore Orioles ===
Karns signed a one–year, major league contract with the Baltimore Orioles on February 7, 2019. The deal was worth a reported $800,000 guaranteed, with $200,000 in incentive bonuses for 100 innings pitched. He appeared in four games before being placed on the disabled list with a forearm strain. On July 26, Karns was designated for assignment by the Orioles. He cleared waivers and was sent outright to the Triple–A Norfolk Tides on August 2. Karns was released by the Orioles organization on August 7.

== Personal life ==
Nathan Karns got married in December 2015 to Jennifer Karns (formerly Jennifer Boecker).

Karns is currently a realtor for real estate firm Rogers Healy and Associates Real Estate in Dallas, Texas.
