= C. J. Riefenhauser =

American baseball player (born 1990)

- Pitcher
- Born: January 30, 1990 (age 36); Yonkers, New York, U.S.
- Batted: Left Threw: Left

MLB debut
- April 19, 2014, for the Tampa Bay Rays

Last MLB appearance
- October 3, 2015, for the Tampa Bay Rays

MLB statistics
- Win–loss record: 1–0
- Earned run average: 6.30
- Strikeouts: 9
- Stats at Baseball Reference

Teams
- Tampa Bay Rays (2014–2015)

Charles Joseph Riefenhauser (born January 30, 1990) is an American former professional baseball pitcher. He played in Major League Baseball (MLB) for the Tampa Bay Rays. He is the head baseball coach at Yorktown High School, a position he has held since 2019.

== Playing career ==
=== Amateur career ===
Riefenhauser was raised in Mahopac, New York, and he graduated from Mahopac High School. He then attended Chipola Junior College.

=== Tampa Bay Rays ===
Riefenhauser was drafted in the 20th round of the 2010 Major League Baseball draft. That year he played for the Princeton Rays and the Bowling Green Hot Rods, and recorded a combined ERA of 2.25 with only 28.0 IP. In the 2011 season he played for both the Hot Rods and the Charlotte Stone Crabs with an ERA of 2.80 and 138.1 IP.

Riefenhauser represented the Rays at the 2013 All-Star Futures Game. He was added to the Rays 40-man roster on November 20, 2013. He was called up on April 19, 2014 to make his MLB debut, and sent back down on April 21. He was recalled again on September 16, after the Durham Bulls' post-season ended.

In 2015, Riefenhauser made 17 appearances with the Rays, earning his first major league win on June 14 against the Chicago White Sox.

=== Chicago Cubs ===
On November 5, 2015, the Rays traded Riefenhauser, Nate Karns, and Boog Powell to the Seattle Mariners in exchange for Brad Miller, Danny Farquhar, and Logan Morrison.

On December 2, before ever suiting up for the Mariners, Riefenhauser was the player to be named later traded along with Mark Trumbo to the Baltimore Orioles in exchange for Steve Clevenger. He was designated for assignment by the Orioles following the acquisition of Odrisamer Despaigne on February 4, 2016. Riefenhauser was claimed by the Chicago Cubs on February 12. On May 26, Riefenhauser was removed from the 40-man roster and sent outright to the Triple-A Iowa Cubs. In 29 appearances split between Iowa and the rookie-level Arizona League Cubs, he compiled a 2-1 record and 4.71 ERA with 26 strikeouts and one save across 28 2/3 innings pitched. Riefenhauser was released by the Cubs organization on August 20.

=== Rockland Boulders ===
On December 6, 2016, Riefenhauser signed a minor league contract with the Houston Astros organization. He was released prior to the start of the season on March 27, 2017.

On May 20, 2017, Riefenhauser signed with the Rockland Boulders of the Can-Am League. In 23 appearances (eight starts) for the Boulders, he compiled a 5-1 record and 3.81 ERA with 45 strikeouts across 54 1/3 innings pitched. Riefenhauser was released by Rockland on April 13, 2018.

== Coaching career ==
In September 2019, Riefenhauser was hired as the coach for the baseball team at Yorktown High School in Yorktown Heights, New York.
