= Brandon Gomes =

American baseball player and executive (born 1984)

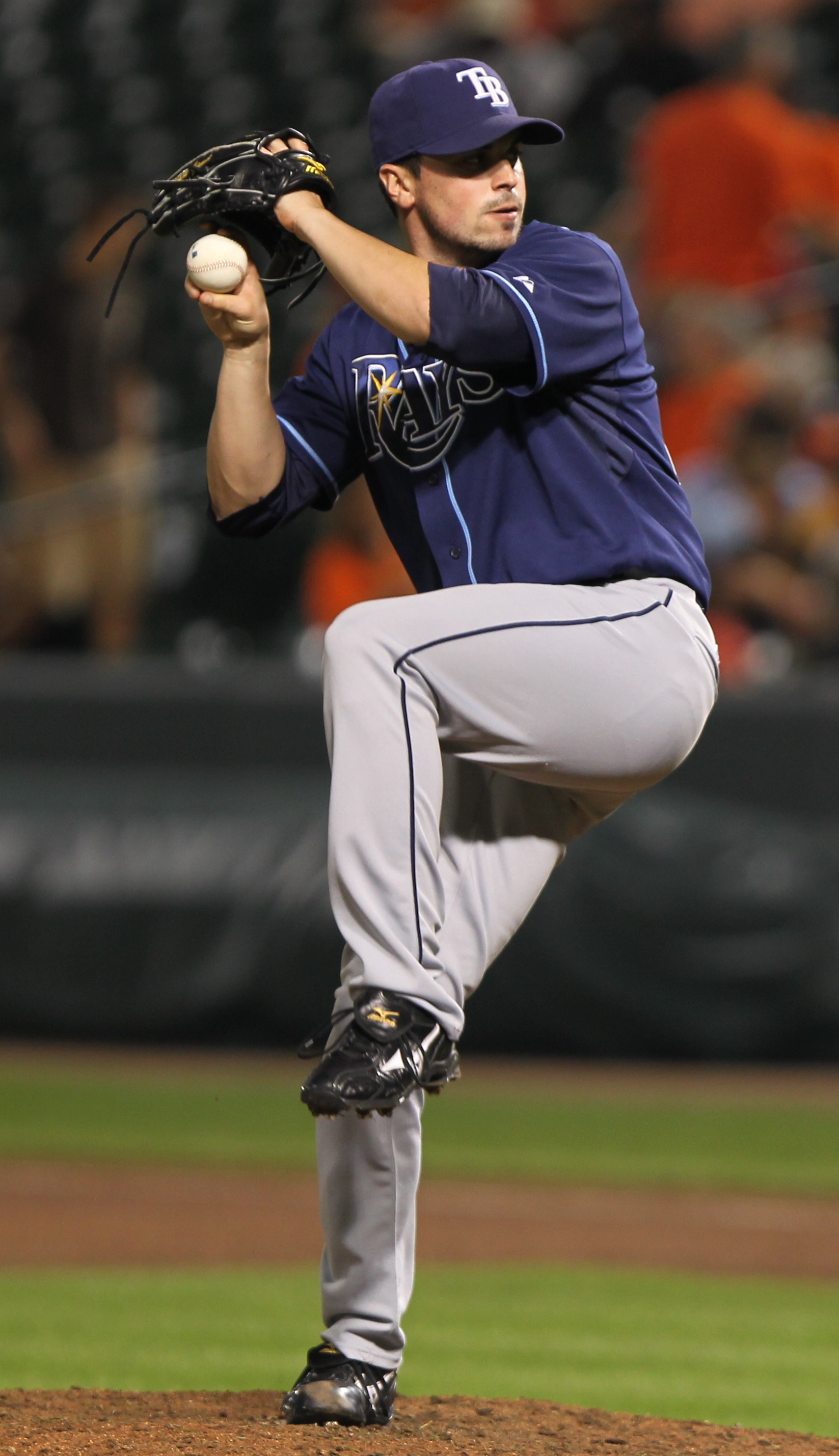
- Gomes with the Tampa Bay Rays in 2011

Los Angeles Dodgers
- Pitcher / General manager
- Born: July 15, 1984 (age 42); Fall River, Massachusetts, U.S.
- Batted: Right Threw: Right

MLB debut
- May 3, 2011, for the Tampa Bay Rays

Last MLB appearance
- October 3, 2015, for the Tampa Bay Rays

MLB statistics
- Win–loss record: 11–12
- Earned run average: 4.20
- Strikeouts: 144
- Stats at Baseball Reference

Teams
- As player: Tampa Bay Rays (2011–2015); As general manager: Los Angeles Dodgers (2022–present)

Career highlights and awards
- 2x World Series champion (2024, 2025)

Brandon Paul Gomes (born July 15, 1984) is an American former professional baseball pitcher and current baseball executive. He played for the Tampa Bay Rays of Major League Baseball (MLB) from 2011 to 2015. After his playing career ended, Gomes joined the Los Angeles Dodgers as a pitching coordinator. He was successively promoted to director of player development in 2017, an assistant general manager in 2019, and general manager in 2022.

== Amateur career ==
Born and raised in Fall River, Massachusetts, Gomes attended Durfee High School. At Durfee, Gomes pitched and also played shortstop, hitting .425 with 14 home runs and 83 RBIs while also compiling a record of 19–5 with a 1.66 ERA and 287 strikeouts. Gomes, who was also a member of the National Honor Society, was Massachusetts High School Gatorade Player of the Year and also won All-State honors twice. After high school, Gomes attended Tulane University. After having a successful freshman season, Gomes had Tommy John surgery during his sophomore year, receiving a medical redshirt. As a redshirt sophomore, Gomes continued to work out of both the bullpen and starting rotation, but later became a full-time starter as a junior. As a senior, Gomes improved, going 7–6 with a 3.92 ERA and 74 strikeouts in 96.1 innings. In 2003 and 2006, Gomes played for the Falmouth Commodores of the Cape Cod Baseball League, going 2–2 with a 3.62 ERA for the team in 2006.

== Professional playing career ==
=== San Diego Padres ===
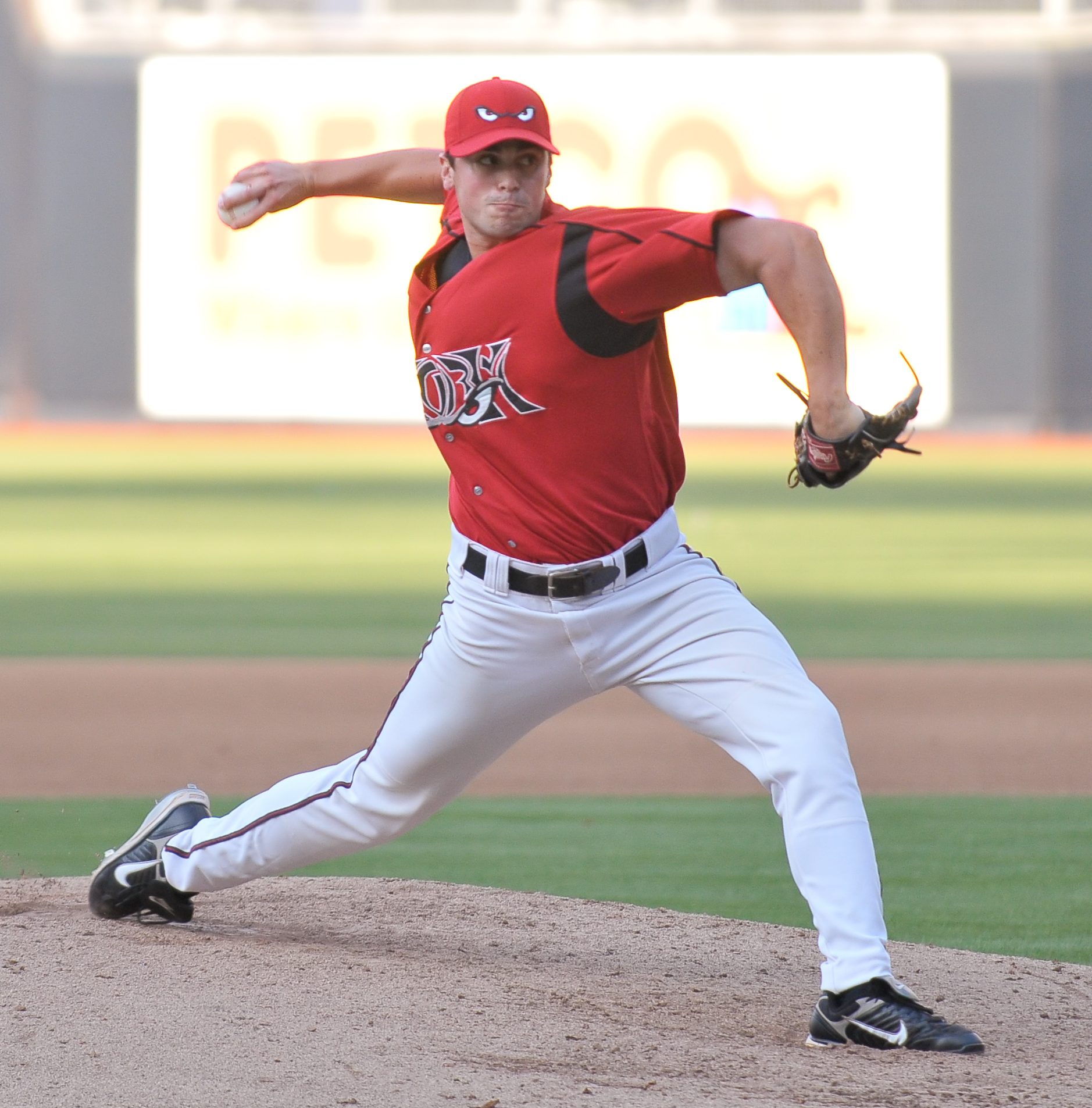
Gomes pitching for Lake Elsinore in 2008.

Gomes was selected by the San Diego Padres in the seventeenth round (537th overall) of the 2007 MLB draft out of Tulane. He began his professional career that year by pitching in 18 games, 11 as a starter, with a 4.23 ERA for the Eugene Emeralds and the Fort Wayne Wizards in the Padres farm system. He moved to the bullpen in 2008 with Fort Wayne and was promoted to the Lake Elsinore Storm of the Advanced–A California League on July 11. Between the two levels, he had a 6–3 record, 3.30 ERA and 81 strikeouts.

In 2009, Gomes was assigned to the Double–A San Antonio Missions of the Texas League. He was 4–1 with a 2.63 EFA in 65 games with 100 strikeouts, the top total in all of minor league baseball. After playing for the Peoria Saguaros in the Arizona Fall League, he returned to San Antonio for the 2010 season, compiling a 7–2 record, 1.87 ERA and 93 strikeouts in 51 games. The Padres added him to their 40-man roster on November 18 to protect him from the Rule 5 Draft.

=== Tampa Bay Rays ===
In December 2010 Gomes was traded to the Tampa Bay Rays along with Adam Russell, Cesar Ramos and Cole Figueroa in exchange for Jason Bartlett and a player to be named later. He was assigned to the Triple–A Durham Bulls to begin the 2011 season and pitched in 20 games for them, with a 1.42 ERA and 40 strikeouts in 25 1/3 innings with seven saves.

Gomes was called up to the Rays and made his major league debut on May 3, 2011, pitching two scoreless innings against the Toronto Blue Jays, allowing only one walk. He recorded his first major league strikeout in his third appearance, on May 7, against Derrek Lee of the Baltimore Orioles. On the season, he appeared in 40 games, with a 2–1 record, 2.92 ERA and 32 strikeouts in 37 innings.

In 2012, Gomes spent most of the season back with Durham, pitching 55 1/3 innings over 40 games with a 3.09 ERA and 73 strikeouts. He pitched in 15 games in the majors, allowing 10 earned runs in 17 2/3 innings. On June 24, in the second game of a doubleheader, he became just the third American League pitcher to draw a bases-loaded walk since the designated hitter rule came into effect in 1973. In 2013 he was sidelines from May through mid-August because of a right lat strain and pitched 19 1/3 innings over 26 games with a 6.52 ERA. He used his time while rehabbing that year to observe the scouting department and how they prepared for the draft, which would be helpful for him later in his career.

Gomes split 2014 between Durham and the Rays, with 27 games and a 3.62 ERA in the minors and 29 games and a 3.71 ERA in the majors. He was designated for assignment by the Rays on December 19, but cleared waivers and was sent outright to Durham on December 23. Gomes was added back to the Rays roster on April 19, 2015 after they released former closer Grant Balfour and he pitched in 63 games for them with a 2–7 record and 4.27 ERA. He was again designated for assignment on November 20 He elected to become a free agent rather than accept another outright to the minors.

=== Chicago Cubs ===
On December 23, 2015, Gomes signed a minor league contract with the Chicago Cubs. He made 19 appearances for the Triple-A Iowa Cubs in 2016, logging a 1-2 record and 3.97 ERA with 20 strikeouts across 22 2/3 innings pitched. Gomes was released by the Cubs organization on June 4, 2016.

=== Pitching style ===
Gomes threw three pitches: a four-seam fastball (90-92 mph), a curveball (78-82), and a splitter (81-86). The curveball was primarily used against right-handed hitters, while left-handed hitters saw more of the splitter.

== Baseball executive ==
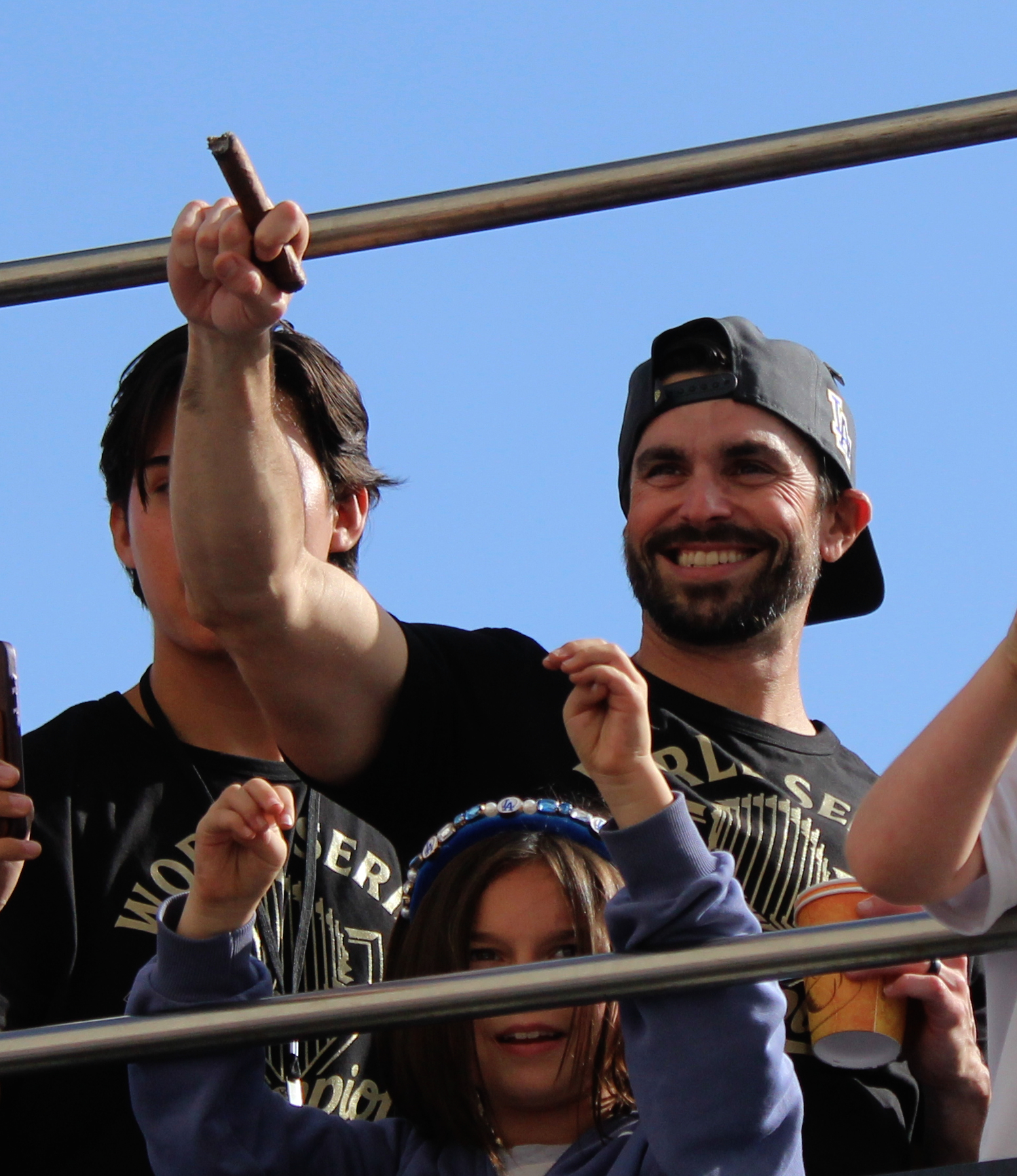
Brandon Gomes at the Los Angeles Dodgers parade, 2025

After his release from the Cubs, Gomes reached out to Los Angeles Dodgers President of Baseball Operations Andrew Friedman, who had signed him with the Rays, and inquired about a job. Friedman hired him as a pitching coordinator. On December 1, 2017, he was promoted to director of player development, replacing Gabe Kapler, who left to manage the Philadelphia Phillies.

Gomes was promoted to vice president and assistant general manager on March 17, 2019 and then, on January 18, 2022, to the position of general manager. Gomes cited his experience as an average player subject to several transactions throughout his career as instrumental to increasing his interest about the work of baseball executives.
