= Charlotte Stone Crabs =

- 2009–2020; Port Charlotte, Florida

Team logo	Cap insignia

Minor league affiliations
- Class: Class A-Advanced (2009–2020)
- League: Florida State League (2009–2020)

Major league affiliations
- Team: Tampa Bay Rays (2009–2020)

Minor league titles
- League titles (3): 1983; 1990; 2015
- Division titles (6): 1983; 1990; 2009; 2010; 2013; 2015

Team data
- Name: Charlotte Stone Crabs (2009–2020)
- Colors: Navy, light blue, yellow, white
- Ballpark: Charlotte Sports Park (2009–2020)

The Charlotte Stone Crabs were a Minor League Baseball team located in Port Charlotte, Florida, from 2009 to 2020. They competed in the Florida State League (FSL) as the Class A-Advanced affiliate of the Tampa Bay Rays Major League Baseball (MLB) team. They played their home games at Charlotte Sports Park and were named for the Florida stone crab, which is indigenous to the Charlotte County region.

The Stone Crabs arrived in Port Charlotte in 2009 after the Vero Beach Devil Rays were purchased by Ripken Baseball and relocated from Vero Beach, Florida. They played 11 seasons in Port Charlotte. The 2020 season was cancelled due to the COVID-19 pandemic. After the cancelled season, the Stone Crabs were dropped as a Rays affiliate and not invited to join another organization as a part of MLB's 2021 reorganization of the minor leagues.

== History ==
On August 25, 2008, it was announced that the Vero Beach Devil Rays, the Class A-Advanced affiliate of the Tampa Bay Devil Rays playing in the Florida State League (FSL), had been sold to Ripken Baseball. This resulted in a relocation of the franchise from Vero Beach, Florida, to Port Charlotte with the team becoming the Charlotte Stone Crabs.

In preparation for the new team's arrival, Charlotte County Stadium, which last housed the Charlotte County Redfish of the now defunct South Coast League, underwent a $27 million renovation, which was completed in January 2009. Renamed Charlotte Sports Park, it became the spring training home of the Tampa Bay Rays as well as the regular season home of the Stone Crabs.

On April 9, 2009, with the Fort Myers Miracle as opponents, Alex Cobb threw the first pitch in Stone Crabs history. A rehabbing B. J. Upton was the first Stone Crabs batter, and Matt Fields hit a home run to lead off the second inning, laying claim to the first Stone Crabs hit, home run, and RBI. After starting the season 0–3, the franchise notched its first win on April 13 in Fort Myers. The Stone Crabs won the South Division title in their first season, but lost the FSL championship to the Tampa Yankees, three games to two. In 2010 and 2013, they again won the FSL South and returned to the league championship series, but lost to the Tampa Yankees (2010) and Daytona Cubs (2013).

In 2012, the Stone Crabs hosted the Florida State League All-Star Game. The South Division All-Stars came from behind for a 6–3 win over the North All-Stars with Charlotte pitchers bookending the game. C. J. Riefenhauser started the evening with a perfect inning and Chris Rearick threw a scoreless ninth for the save. St. Lucie Mets third baseman Wilmer Flores took home Most Valuable Player honors, and Lakeland Flying Tigers outfielder Avisaíl García won the Home Run Derby.

Charlotte won their lone FSL championship in 2015, defeating the Daytona Tortugas, 3–1.

The 2019 season became the team's last. The COVID-19 pandemic resulted in the cancellation of the 2020 season. After the cancelled season, Major League Baseball took direct control of Minor League Baseball. The Stone Crabs were not among the four teams invited to remain as affiliates of the Tampa Bay Rays, with whom they had been affiliated since 2009. This ended the team's 12-year run. General manager Jeff Cook was the team's final employee.

== Uniform ==
The Stone Crabs had four jerseys and two hats that they wore during the season. The uniforms were manufactured by Rawlings and the hats were made by New Era. Navy socks were worn high with all uniforms, per team policy. Player names were not worn on the jersey backs.

=== Jerseys ===
The home white had "Stone Crabs" across the chest with navy piping around the neck, down the center of the jersey, and around the two sleeves. There was also a thin navy line down both white pant legs. The number on the back was navy with a light blue outline.

The road grays had "Charlotte" written across the chest with navy piping around the neck, down the center of the jersey, and around the two sleeves. There was also a thin navy line down both gray pant legs. The number on the back was navy with a white outline. There was also a crab patch on the left sleeve.

The alternate uniform was light blue with the alternate logo (a crab claw grasping a capital C) on the left side of the chest. Parallel navy stripes ran along the shoulders, navy piping circles each sleeve, and navy bars ran from the armpits down the side of the jersey to the base. The number on the back was navy with a white outline. New for the 2014 season and made of a lightweight material, these jerseys were worn nearly every game. As of 2018 these jerseys were no longer worn.

The fourth jersey was the alternate prior to 2014, but was later used exclusively for warm-ups. Made of a mesh material, these navy blue, two button pullovers had "Stone Crabs" across the chest with light blue piping that ran from the collar bone down both sleeves. There was also a light blue semi-circle that ran from the shoulders under each armpit. The numbers on the back were light blue with a white outline. These jerseys were only used for batting practice.

As of 2017, the Stone crabs had another Jersey. The Jersey was navy blue with the SC stone crabs logo on the front of the Jersey. The Jersey featured a crab logo on the sleeve of the jersey. These were worn on select home week days.

=== Hats ===
The primary hat was navy blue with a matching navy brim and button, the "SC" logo on the front, and a white New Era flag logo on the left side.

The alternate hat was light blue with a navy blue brim and button, the alternate crab claw logo on the front, and a navy New Era flag logo on the left side.

The 2014 season saw a new hat added to the rotation, which was used exclusively for warm-ups. It was made of a navy blue, lightweight material with the crab logo on the front, a light blue brim and button, and a light blue New Era flag logo on the left side.

== Team managers and coaches ==
On December 20, 2008, the team announced that Vero Beach manager Jim Morrison would follow the team to Port Charlotte and become the first skipper of the Stone Crabs, a position he would retain through the 2012 season. In 2013, managing duties were passed to Brady Williams, who had managed the class A affiliate Bowling Green Hot Rods for the previous three seasons. Williams was promoted to the Double-A Montgomery Biscuits for the 2014 season and a Hot Rods manager was again called on to fill the vacancy, this time former Tampa Bay Devil Ray Jared Sandberg.

== Season-by-season ==
League champions †	Finals appearance *	Division winner ^	Wild card berth ¤

Year	League	Division	Regular season										Postseason
Year	League	Division	1st half					2nd half					Postseason
Year	League	Division	Finish	Wins	Losses	Win%	GB	Finish	Wins	Losses	Win%	GB	Postseason
2009	FSL	South	2nd	37	31	.544	5.5	2nd ¤	34	35	.493	3	Won semifinals (Fort Myers) 2–1; Lost finals (Tampa) 1–3 *
2010	FSL	South	1st ^	43	26	.623	—	3rd	37	33	.529	1	Won semifinals (Bradenton) 2–1; Lost finals (Tampa) 1–3 *
2011	FSL	South	4th	30	39	.435	7.5	3rd	34	36	.486	11.5	
2012	FSL	South	4th	29	38	.433	19.5	6th	26	41	.388	12.5	
2013	FSL	South	4th	29	38	.433	16	1st ^	38	27	.585	—	Won semifinals (Fort Myers) 2–0; Lost finals Daytona) 1–3*
2014	FSL	South	5th	31	36	.463	9	5th	32	34	.485	9	
2015	FSL	South	1st ^	45	25	.643	—	6th	24	41	.369	17.5	Won semifinals (Palm Beach) 2–0; Won finals (Daytona) 3–1 †
2016	FSL	South	4th	33	36	.478	5.5	5th	31	35	.471	7	
2017	FSL	South	6th	31	37	.456	9.5	2nd	38	29	.567	4	
2018	FSL	South	4th	34	33	.507	6.5	2nd	40	29	.580	—^{[a]}	
2019	FSL	South	4th	35	31	.530	4	1st ^	47	22	.681	—	No playoffs^{[b]}

- ^{a} The Stone Crabs finished with the same record as the Fort Myers Miracle, but since the Miracle had the better head-to-head record in the second half (4–2), the Stone Crabs did not win the division.
- ^{b} The playoffs were canceled due to the impending threat from Hurricane Dorian.

=== All-time records ===
Statistic	Wins	Losses	Win %
Regular season record (2009–2019)	758	732	.509
Postseason record (2009–2019)	14	12	.538
All-time regular and postseason record	772	744	.509

== Noteworthy games ==
=== No-hitter ===
- Blake Snell, August 2, 2014: The first no-hitter in Stone Crabs history was a rain shortened one, as lefty Blake Snell stumped the Daytona Cubs for 5.1 innings before heavy rains washed away the final frames at Charlotte Sports Park. The Stone Crabs won 10–0.

== Single-season records ==
=== Offensive ===
Hits: 145.....Tyler Bortnick '11
Doubles: 38.....Mike Sheridan '11
Triples: 11.....Hak-Ju Lee '11
Homeruns: 14.....Alejandro Segovia & Jeff Malm '13
RBIs: 73.....Richie Shaffer '13
Walks: 79.....Tyler Bortnick '11
Stolen Bases: 43.....Tyler Bortnick '11

=== Pitching ===
Wins: 14.....Jeremy Hall '09
Strikeouts: 208.....Matt Moore '10
Saves: 25.....Zach Quate '10

== Notable Stone Crabs alumni ==
- Alex Cobb (2009)
- Jake McGee (2009)
- Matt Moore (2010)
- Stephen Vogt (2009–10)
- Jake Bauers (2015)
- Blake Snell (2015)
- Brandon Lowe (2017)
- Willy Adames (2015)
- Kenny Rosenberg (2018)
