= 2013 Seattle Mariners season =

Major League Baseball season

2013 Seattle Mariners
- League: American League
- Division: West
- Ballpark: Safeco Field
- City: Seattle, Washington
- Record: 71–91 (.438)
- Divisional place: 4th
- Owners: Nintendo of America (represented by Howard Lincoln)
- General managers: Jack Zduriencik
- Managers: Eric Wedge
- Television: Root Sports Northwest (Dave Sims, Mike Blowers)
- Radio: ESPN-710; Seattle Mariners Radio Network (Rick Rizzs, Aaron Goldsmith)

The 2013 Seattle Mariners season was the 37th season in franchise history. The Mariners played their 14th full season (15th overall) at Safeco Field. They finished with a record of 71–91 and fourth place in the American League West.

== Standings ==
=== American League West ===
AL West
Team	W	L	Pct.	GB	Home	Road
Oakland Athletics	96	66	.593	—	52‍–‍29	44‍–‍37
Texas Rangers	91	72	.558	5½	46‍–‍36	45‍–‍36
Los Angeles Angels of Anaheim	78	84	.481	18	39‍–‍42	39‍–‍42
Seattle Mariners	71	91	.438	25	36‍–‍45	35‍–‍46
Houston Astros	51	111	.315	45	24‍–‍57	27‍–‍54

=== American League Wild Card ===
Division winners
Team	W	L	Pct.
Boston Red Sox	97	65	.599
Oakland Athletics	96	66	.593
Detroit Tigers	93	69	.574

Wild Card teams (Top 2 teams qualify for postseason)
Team	W	L	Pct.	GB
Cleveland Indians	92	70	.568	+½
Tampa Bay Rays	92	71	.564	—
Texas Rangers	91	72	.558	1
Kansas City Royals	86	76	.531	5½
New York Yankees	85	77	.525	6½
Baltimore Orioles	85	77	.525	6½
Los Angeles Angels of Anaheim	78	84	.481	13½
Toronto Blue Jays	74	88	.457	17½
Seattle Mariners	71	91	.438	20½
Minnesota Twins	66	96	.407	25½
Chicago White Sox	63	99	.389	28½
Houston Astros	51	111	.315	40½

=== Record against opponents ===
2013 American League record Source: MLB Standings Grid – 2013
Team	BAL	BOS	CWS	CLE	DET	HOU	KC	LAA	MIN	NYY	OAK	SEA	TB	TEX	TOR	NL
Baltimore	—	11–8	4–3	3–4	4–2	4–2	3–4	5–2	3–3	9–10	5–2	2–4	6–13	5–2	10–9	11–9
Boston	8–11	—	4–2	6–1	3–4	6–1	2–5	3–3	4–3	13–6	3–3	6–1	12–7	2–4	11–8	14–6
Chicago	3–4	2–4	—	2–17	7–12	3–4	9–10	3–4	8–11	3–3	2–5	3–3	2–5	4–2	4–3	8–12
Cleveland	4–3	1–6	17–2	—	4–15	6–1	10–9	4–2	13–6	1–6	5–2	5–2	2–4	5–1	4–2	11–9
Detroit	2–4	4–3	12–7	15–4	—	6–1	9–10	0–6	11–8	3–3	3–4	5–2	3–3	3–4	5–2	12–8
Houston	2–4	1–6	4–3	1–6	1–6	—	2–4	10–9	1–5	1–5	4–15	9–10	2–5	2–17	3–4	8–12
Kansas City	4–3	5–2	10–9	9–10	10–9	4–2	—	2–5	15–4	2–5	1–5	4–3	6–1	3–3	2–4	9–11
Los Angeles	2–5	3–3	4–3	2–4	6–0	9–10	5–2	—	1–5	3–4	8–11	11–8	4–3	4–15	6–1	10–10
Minnesota	3–3	3–4	11–8	6–13	8–11	5–1	4–15	5–1	—	2–5	1–6	4–3	1–6	4–3	1–5	8–12
New York	10–9	6–13	3–3	6–1	3–3	5–1	5–2	4–3	5–2	—	1–5	4–3	7–12	3–4	14–5	9–11
Oakland	2–5	3–3	5–2	2–5	4–3	15–4	5–1	11–8	6–1	5–1	—	8–11	3–3	10–9	4–3	13–7
Seattle	4–2	1–6	3–3	2–5	2–5	10–9	3–4	8–11	3–4	3–4	11–8	—	3–3	7–12	3–3	8–12
Tampa Bay	13–6	7–12	5–2	4–2	3–3	5–2	1–6	3–4	6–1	12–7	3–3	3–3	—	4–4	11–8	12–8
Texas	2–5	4–2	2–4	1–5	4–3	17–2	3–3	15–4	3–4	4–3	9–10	12–7	4–4	—	1–6	10–10
Toronto	9–10	8–11	3–4	2–4	2–5	4–3	4–2	1–6	5–1	5–14	3–4	3–3	8–11	6–1	—	11–9

=== Game log ===
Legend
	Mariners win
	Mariners loss
	Postponement
**Bold**	Mariners team member

2013 Game Log: 71–91 (Home: 36–45; Road: 35–46)
April: 12–17 (Home: 8–8; Road: 4–9)

#	Date	Opponent	Score	Win	Loss	Save	Attendance	Record	Boxscore
1	April 1	@ Athletics	2–0	**Hernández** (1–0)	Anderson (0–1)	**Wilhelmsen** (1)	36,067	1–0	
2	April 2	@ Athletics	7–1	**Iwakuma** (1–0)	Parker (0–1)	—	15,315	2–0	
3	April 3	@ Athletics	2–6	Milone (1–0)	**Saunders** (0–1)	—	15,162	2–1	
4	April 4	@ Athletics	2–8	Griffin (1–0)	**Maurer** (0–1)	—	12,134	2–2	
5	April 5	@ White Sox	8–7 (10)	**Loe** (1–0)	Jones (0–1)	**Wilhelmsen** (2)	15,312	3–2	
6	April 6	@ White Sox	3–4	Veal (1–0)	**Hernández** (1–1)	Reed (3)	22,461	3–3	
7	April 7	@ White Sox	3–4 (10)	Reed (1–0)	**Loe** (1–1)	—	18,708	3–4	
8	April 8	Astros	3–0	**Saunders** (1–1)	Humber (0–2)	**Wilhelmsen** (3)	42,589	4–4	
9	April 9	Astros	9–16	Clemens (1–0)	**Maurer** (0–2)	—	10,745	4–5	
10	April 10	Astros	3–8	Peacock (1–1)	**Beavan** (0–1)	—	10,493	4–6	
11	April 11	Rangers	3–4	Ortiz (1–0)	**Hernández** (1–2)	Nathan (3)	22,917	4–7	
12	April 12	Rangers	3–1	**Iwakuma** (2–0)	Darvish (2–1)	**Wilhelmsen** (4)	15,029	5–7	
13	April 13	Rangers	1–3	Ortiz (2–0)	**Capps** (0–1)	Nathan (4)	23,461	5–8	
14	April 14	Rangers	4–3	**Maurer** (1–2)	Tepesch (1–1)	**Wilhelmsen** (5)	16,981	6–8	
15	April 16	Tigers	2–6	Fister (3–0)	**Harang** (0–1)	—	12,379	6–9	
16	April 17	Tigers	1–2 (14)	Smyly (1–0)	**Furbush** (0–1)	Benoit (1)	14,981	6–10	
17	April 18	Tigers	2–0	**Capps** (1–1)	Verlander (2–2)	**Wilhelmsen** (6)	15,742	7–10	
18	April 19	@ Rangers	0–7	Darvish (3–1)	**Saunders** (1–2)	—	36,273	7–11	
19	April 20	@ Rangers	0–5	Lowe (1–0)	**Maurer** (1–3)	—	43,025	7–12	
20	April 21	@ Rangers	3–11	Grimm (1–0)	**Harang** (0–2)	Kirkman (1)	44,599	7–13	
21	April 22	@ Astros	7–1	**Hernández** (2–2)	Peacock (1–2)	—	23,201	8–13	
22	April 23	@ Astros	2–3	Norris (3–2)	**Iwakuma** (2–1)	Veras (2)	13,929	8–14	
23	April 24	@ Astros	3–10	Harrell (2–2)	**Saunders** (1–3)	—	11,686	8–15	
24	April 25	Angels	6–0	**Maurer** (2–3)	Richards (1–1)	—	13,000	9–15	
25	April 26	Angels	3–6	Wilson (2–0)	**Harang** (0–3)	Frieri (3)	31,543	9–16	
26	April 27	Angels	3–2	**Hernández** (3–2)	Blanton (0–4)	**Wilhelmsen** (7)	31,901	10–16	
27	April 28	Angels	2–1	**Capps** (2–1)	Vargas (0–3)	**Wilhelmsen** (8)	20,638	11–16	
28	April 29	Orioles	6–2	**Saunders** (2–3)	Britton (0–1)	—	9,818	12–16	
29	April 30	Orioles	2–7	Hammel (4–1)	**Maurer** (2–4)	—	13,629	12–17	

May: 12–14 (Home: 5–4; Road: 7–10)

#	Date	Opponent	Score	Win	Loss	Save	Attendance	Record	Boxscore
30	May 1	Orioles	8–3	**Harang** (1–3)	Chen (2–3)	—	12,936	13–17	
31	May 3	@ Blue Jays	4–0	**Hernández** (4–2)	Romero (0–1)	—	23,779	14–17	
32	May 4	@ Blue Jays	8–1	**Iwakuma** (3–1)	Dickey (2–5)	—	35,754	15–17	
33	May 5	@ Blue Jays	2–10	Morrow (1–2)	**Saunders** (2–4)	—	22,937	15–18	
34	May 7	@ Pirates	1–4	Gómez (2–0)	**Harang** (1–4)	Grilli (13)	12,973	15–19	
35	May 8	@ Pirates	2–1	**Hernández** (5–2)	Burnett (3–3)	**Wilhelmsen** (9)	18,877	16–19	
36	May 10	Athletics	6–3	**Iwakuma** (4–1)	Straily (1–1)	**Wilhelmsen** (10)	25,509	17–19	
37	May 11	Athletics	3–4	Parker (2–5)	**Maurer** (2–5)	Balfour (6)	30,089	17–20	
38	May 12	Athletics	6–1	**Saunders** (3–4)	Milone (3–5)	—	27,599	18–20	
39	May 14	@ Yankees	3–4	Kelley (2–0)	**Furbush** (0–2)	Rivera (16)	41,267	18–21	
40	May 15	@ Yankees	12–2	**Iwakuma** (5–1)	Hughes (0–2)	—	41,267	19–21	
41	May 16	@ Yankees	3–2	**Pérez** (1–0)	Pettitte (4–3)	**Wilhelmsen** (11)	35,392	20–21	
42	May 17	@ Indians	3–6 (10)	Pestano (1–0)	**Leutge** (0–1)	—	34,282	20–22	
43	May 18	@ Indians	4–5	Perez (2–0)	**Pérez** (1–1)	—	17,574	20–23	
44	May 19	@ Indians	0–6	Masterson (7–2)	**Hernández** (5–3)	—	19,744	20–24	
45	May 20	@ Indians	8–10 (10)	Smith (2–0)	**Furbush** (0–3)	—	19,390	20–25	
46	May 21	@ Angels	0–12	Williams (3–1)	**Harang** (1–5)	—	34,095	20–26	
47	May 22	@ Angels	1–7	Wilson (4–3)	**Maurer** (2–6)	—	33,313	20–27	
48	May 24	Rangers	5–9	Grimm (4–3)	**Saunders** (3–5)	Nathan (15)	22,053	20–28	
49	May 25	Rangers	2–5	Holland (4–2)	**Hernández** (5–4)	Nathan (16)	35,022	20–29	
50	May 26	Rangers	4–3 (13)	**Medina** (1–0)	Kirkman (0–1)	—	23,154	21–29	
51	May 27	Padres	9–0	**Harang** (2–5)	Richard (0–5)	—	18,942	22–29	
52	May 28	Padres	1–6	Vólquez (4–5)	**Maurer** (2–7)	—	11,911	22–30	
53	May 29	@ Padres	2–3 (10)	Gregerson (3–2)	**Medina** (1–1)	—	19,882	22–31	
54	May 30	@ Padres	7–1	**Hernández** (6–2)	Cashner (4–3)	—	18,809	23–31	
55	May 31	@ Twins	3–0	**Iwakuma** (6-1)	Pelfrey (3-6)	**Wilhelmsen** (12)	31,430	24-31	

June: 11–16 (Home: 8–10; Road: 3–6)

#	Date	Opponent	Score	Win	Loss	Save	Attendance	Record	Boxscore
56	June 1	@ Twins	4–5	Thielbar (1–0)	**Wilhelmsen** (0–1)	—	33,417	24–32	
57	June 2	@ Twins	0–10	Diamond (4–4)	**Bonderman** (0–1)	—	34,876	24–33	
58	June 3	White Sox	4–2	**Saunders** (4–5)	Danks (0–2)	**Wilhelmsen** (13)	13,491	25–33	
59	June 4	White Sox	7–4	**Hernández** (7–4)	Peavy (6–4)	**Wilhelmsen** (14)	16,294	26–33	
60	June 5	White Sox	5–7 (16)	Reed (2–0)	**Noesí** (0–1)	—	20,139	26–34	
61	June 6	Yankees	1–6	Hughes (3–4)	**Harang** (2–6)	—	18,776	26–35	
62	June 7	Yankees	4–1	**Bonderman** (1–1)	Kuroda (6–5)	**Wilhelmsen** (15)	26,248	27–35	
63	June 8	Yankees	1-3	Pettitte (5-3)	**Saunders** (4-6)	Rivera (22)	38,252	27-36	
64	June 9	Yankees	1-2	Robertson (4-1)	**Medina** (1-2)	Rivera (23)	43,389	27-37	
65	June 10	Astros	3-2	**Iwakuma** (7-1)	Keuchel (3-3)	**Wilhelmsen** (16)	12,811	28-37	
66	June 11	Astros	4-0	**Harang** (3-6)	Norris (5-6)	–	10,266	28-38	
67	June 12	Astros	1-6	Clemens (4-2)	**Wilhelmsen** (0-2)	–	13,823	29-38	
68	June 14	@ Athletics	3-2	**Saunders** (5-6)	Milone (6-6)	**Pérez** (1)	31,448	30-38	
69	June 15	@ Athletics	4-0	**Hernández** (8-4)	Griffin (5-6)	–	24,378	31-38	
70	June 16	@ Athletics	2-10	Colón (9-2)	**Iwakuma** (7-2)	–	36,067	31-39	
71	June 17	@ Angels	3-11	Vargas (6-4)	**Harang** (3-7)	–	30,258	31-40	
72	June 18	@ Angels	3-2 (10)	**Furbush** (1-3)	Richards (2-4)	**Medina** (1)	33,040	32-40	
73	June 19	@ Angels	0-1	Wilson (6-5)	**Saunders** (5-7)	Frieri (16)	35,401	32-41	
74	June 20	@ Angels	9-10	Downs (1-2)	**Capps** (2-2)	Frieri (17)	37,711	32-42	
75	June 21	Athletics	3-6	Colón (10-2)	Iwakuma' (7-3)	Balfour (18)	23,086	32-43	
76	June 22	Athletics	7-5	**Medina** (2-2)	Cook (1-1)	–	20,704	33-43	
77	June 23	Athletics	6-3 (10)	**Pérez** (2-1)	Balfour (0-1)	–	22,813	34-43	
78	June 25	Pirates	4-9	Locke (7-1)	'Saunders (5-8)	–	21,074	34-44	
79	June 26	Pirates	2-4	Mazzaro (4-2)	**Furbush** (1-4)	Melancon (2)	21,265	34-45	
80	June 28	Cubs	5-4 (10)	**Medina** (3-2)	Parker (0-1)	–	31,471	35-45	
81	June 29	Cubs	3-5 (11)	Villanueva (2-4)	**Pérez** (2-2)	Parker (1)	34,630	35-46	
82	June 30	Cubs	6-7	Jackson (4-10)	**Bonderman** (1-2)	Gregg (13)	24,701	35-47	

July: 15–10 (Home: 8–6; Road: 7–4)

#	Date	Opponent	Score	Win	Loss	Save	Attendance	Record	Boxscore
83	July 2	@ Rangers	9-2	**Saunders** (6-8)	Grimm (7-6)	–	39,579	36-47	
84	July 3	@ Rangers	4-2 (10)	**Furbush** (2-4)	Ross (4-2)	**Wilhelmsen** (17)	39,468	37-47	
85	July 4	@ Rangers	4-5	Lindblom (1-2)	**Iwakuma** (7-4)	Nathan (28)	46,476	37-48	
86	July 5	@ Reds	4-2	**Harang** (4-7)	Leake (7-4)	**Pérez** (2)	33,596	38-48	
87	July 6	@ Reds	4-13	Latos (8-2)	**Bonderman** (1-3)	–	34,965	38-49	
88	July 7	@ Reds	3-1	**Saunders** (7-8)	Arroyo (7-7)	**Wilhelmsen** (18)	32,669	39-49	
89	July 8	Red Sox	11-4	**Hernández** (9-4)	Lester (8-5)	–	21,830	40-49	
90	July 9	Red Sox	8-11	Breslow (3-2)	**Beavan** (0-2)	Uehara (6)	21,076	40-50	
91	July 10	Red Sox	4-11	Doubront (6-3)	**Harang** (4-8)	–	20,468	40-51	
92	July 11	Red Sox	7-8 (10)	Wright (1-0)	**Wilhelmsen** (0-3)	Uehara (7)	25,367	40-52	
93	July 12	Angels	8-3	**Saunders** (8-8)	Williams (5-5)	–	21,375	41-52	
94	July 13	Angels	6-0	**Hernández** (10-4)	Weaver (3-5)	–	32,466	42-52	
95	July 14	Angels	4-3	**Iwakuma** (8-4)	Blanton (2-12)	**Wilhelmsen** (19)	25,643	43-52	
96	July 19	@ Astros	10-7	**Saunders** (9-8)	Norris (6-9)	**Wilhelmsen** (20)	24,635	44-52	
97	July 20	@ Astros	4-2	**Iwakuma** (9-4)	Bédard (3-7)	**Wilhelmsen** (21)	25,733	45-52	
98	July 21	@ Astros	12-5	**Hernández** (11-4)	Lyles (4-4)	–	38,838	46-52	
99	July 22	Indians	2-1	**Harang** (5-8)	Jiménez (7-5)	**Wilhelmsen** (22)	18,009	47-52	
100	July 23	Indians	4-3	**Ramirez** (1-0)	McAllister (4-6)	**Wilhelmsen** (23)	16,308	48-52	
101	July 24	Indians	1-10	Kazmir (6-4)	**Saunders** (9-9)	–	25,688	48-53	
102	July 25	Twins	8-2	**Iwakuma** (10-4)	Correia (7-7)	–	18,135	49-53	
103	July 26	Twins	2-3 (13)	Duensing (3-1)	**Medina** (3-3)	Perkins (25)	23,162	49-54	
104	July 27	Twins	0-4	Deduno (7-4)	**Harang** (5-9)	–	24,524	49-55	
105	July 28	Twins	6-4	**Ramirez** (2-0)	Gibson (2-3)	**Wilhelmsen** (24)	35,087	50-55	
106	July 30	@ Red Sox	2-8	Workman (1-1)	**Saunders** (9-10)	–	34,578	50-56	
107	July 31	@ Red Sox	4-5 (15)	Britton (1-0)	**Luetge** (0-2)	–	35,059	50-57	

August: 12–16 (Home: 2–10; Road: 10–6)

#	Date	Opponent	Score	Win	Loss	Save	Attendance	Record	Boxscore
108	August 1	@ Red Sox	7-8	Wright (2-0)	**Pérez** (2-3)	–	35,886	50-58	
109	August 2	@ Orioles	8-11	Tillman (14-3)	**Harang** (5-10)	Johnson (38)	25,947	50-59	
110	August 3	@ Orioles	8-4	**Ramirez** (3-0)	Feldman (9-9)	**Farquhar** (1)	35,231	51-59	
111	August 4	@ Orioles	3-2	**Saunders** (10-10)	Chen (6-4)	**Farquhar** (2)	30,759	52-59	
112	August 5	Blue Jays	1-3	Dickey (9-11)	**Iwakuma** (10-5)	Janssen (20)	32,300	52-60	
113	August 6	Blue Jays	2-7	Johnson (2-8)	**Hernández** (11-5)	–	28,198	52-61	
114	August 7	Blue Jays	9-7	**Maurer** (3-7)	Loup (4-4)	**Farquhar** (3)	34,792	53-61	
115	August 9	Brewers	5-10	Lohse (8-7)	**Saunders** (10-11)	–	34,827	53-62	
116	August 10	Brewers	0-10	Gorzelanny (3-4)	**Iwakuma** (10-6)	–	46,027	53-63	
117	August 11	Brewers	2-0	**Hernández** (12-5)	Peralta (8-12)	**Farquhar** (4)	25,390	54-63	
118	August 13	@ Rays	5-4	**Ramirez** (4-0)	Archer (6-5)	**Farquhar** (5)	13,294	55-63	
119	August 14	@ Rays	4-5	Peralta (2-5)	**Farquhar** (0-1)	–	14,910	55-64	
120	August 15	@ Rays	1-7	Cobb (7-2)	**Saunders** (10-12)	–	13,299	55-65	
121	August 16	@ Rangers	3-1	**Iwakuma** (11-6)	Cotts (4-2)	**Farquhar** (6)	37,596	56-65	
122	August 17	@ Rangers	3-15	Perez (6-3)	**Hernández** (12-6)	–	44,247	56-66	
123	August 18	@ Rangers	4-3	**Medina** (4-3)	Nathan (3-2)	**Farquhar** (7)	40,832	57-66	
124	August 19	@ Athletics	1-2	Parker (9-6)	**Capps** (2-3)	–	11,112	57-67	
125	August 20	@ Athletics	7-4	**Maurer** (4-7)	Doolittle (4-5)	**Farquhar** (8)	13,041	58-67	
126	August 21	@ Athletics	5-3	**Iwakuma** (12-6)	Griffin (10-9)	**Farquhar** (9)	18,641	59-67	
127	August 23	Angels	0-2	Richards (4-5)	**Hernández** (12-7)	Frieri (27)	21,616	59-68	
128	August 24	Angels	1-5	Vargas (7-5)	**Ramírez** (4-1)	–	24,477	59-69	
129	August 25	Angels	1-7	Weaver (8-7)	**Harang** (5-11)	–	22,999	59-70	
130	August 26	Rangers	3-8	Blackley (2-1)	**Saunders** (10-13)	–	15,995	59-71	
131	August 27	Rangers	3-4 (10)	Scheppers (6-2)	**Farquhar** (0-2)	Nathan (38)	15,115	59-72	
132	August 28	Rangers	4-12	Perez (8-3)	**Hernández** (12-8)	–	22,420	59-73	
133	August 29	@ Astros	3-2	**Ramírez** (5-1)	Lyles (6-7)	**Farquhar** (10)	22,203	60-73	
134	August 30	@ Astros	7-1	**Walker** (1-0)	Peacock (3-5)	–	13,869	61-73	
135	August 31	@ Astros	3-1	**Saunders** (11-13)	Keuchel (5-8)	**Farquhar** (11)	21,085	62-73	

September: 9-18 (Home: 5-7; Road: 4-11)

#	Date	Opponent	Score	Win	Loss	Save	Attendance	Record	Boxscore
136	September 1	@ Astros	0-2	Oberholtzer (4-1)	**Furbush** (2-5)	–	17,203	62-74	
137	September 2	@ Royals	1-3	Smith (2-1)	**Hernández** (12-9)	Holland (37)	20,063	62-75	
138	September 3	@ Royals	3-4	Hochevar (4-2)	**Medina** (4-4)	Holland (38)	13,638	62-76	
139	September 4	@ Royals	6-4	**Luetge** (1-2)	Crow (7-5)	**Farquhar** (12)	13,621	63-76	
140	September 5	@ Royals	6-7 (13)	Coleman (3-0)	**Ruffin** (0-1)	–	14,004	63-77	
141	September 6	Rays	6-4	**Capps** (3-3)	Peralta (2-6)	**Farquhar** (13)	14,796	64-77	
142	September 7	Rays	6-2	**Paxton** (1-0)	Archer (8-7)	–	17,773	65-77	
143	September 8	Rays	1-4	McGee (4-3)	**Medina** (4-5)	Rodney (33)	18,645	65-78	
144	September 9	Astros	4-6	Chapman (1-1)	**Farquhar** (0-3)	Fields (4)	9,808	65-79	
145	September 10	Astros	2-13	Lyles (7-7)	**Saunders** (11-14)	–	10,245	65-80	
146	September 11	Astros	1-6	Peacock (5-5)	**Maurer** (4-8)	Zeid (1)	11,656	65-81	
147	September 13	@ Cardinals	1-2 (10)	Siegrist (3-1)	**Ruffin** (0-2)	–	40,506	65-82	
148	September 14	@ Cardinals	4-1	**Paxton** (2-0)	Wacha (3-1)	**Farquhar** (14)	41,374	66-82	
149	September 15	@ Cardinals	2-12	Miller (14-9)	**Ramírez** (5-2)	–	40,526	66-83	
150	September 16	@ Tigers	2-4	Porcello (13-8)	**Saunders** (11-15)	Benoit (21)	34,063	66-84	
151	September 17	@ Tigers	2-6	Alburquerque (3-3)	**Medina** (4-6)	–	39,076	66-85	
152	September 18	@ Tigers	8-0	**Iwakuma** (13-6)	Verlander (13-12)	–	36,395	67-85	
153	September 19	@ Tigers	4-5	Fister (13-9)	**Furbush** (2-6)	Benoit (22)	38,431	67-86	
154	September 20	@ Angels	2-3 (11)	Rasmus (1-1)	**LaFromboise** (0-1)	–	39,469	67-87	
155	September 21	@ Angels	5-6	Williams (9-10)	**Saunders** (11-16)	Frieri (36)	41,001	67-88	
156	September 22	@ Angels	3-2	**Pérez** (3-3)	Wilson (17-7)	**Farquhar** (15)	39,099	68-88	
157	September 23	Royals	5-6	Davis (8-11)	**Luetge** (1-3)	Holland (45)	12,790	68-89	
158	September 24	Royals	4-0	**Paxton** (3-0)	Chen (8-4)	–	12,528	69-89	
159	September 25	Royals	6-0	**Iwakuma** (14-6)	Santana (9-10)	–	15,347	70-89	
160	September 27	Athletics	2-8	Colón (18-6)	**Hernández** (12-10)	–	23,014	70-90	
161	September 28	Athletics	7-5	**Maurer** (5-8)	Parker (12-8)	**Farquhar** (16)	17,751	71-90	
162	September 29	Athletics	0-9	Gray (5-3)	**Ramírez** (5-3)	–	17,081	71-91	

=== Roster ===
2013 Seattle Mariners
**Roster**
**Pitchers**: 49 Blake Beavan; 32 Jeremy Bonderman; 58 Carter Capps; 40 Danny Farquhar; 41 Charlie Furbush; 39 Aaron Harang; 34 Félix Hernández; 18 Hisashi Iwakuma; 30 Bobby LaFromboise; 31 Kameron Loe; 44 Lucas Luetge; 37 Brandon Maurer; 31 Yoervis Medina; 45 Héctor Noesí; 65 James Paxton; 59 Óliver Pérez; 46 Stephen Pryor; 50 Erasmo Ramírez; 57 Chance Ruffin; 23 Joe Saunders; 27 Taijuan Walker; 54 Tom Wilhelmsen	**Catchers**: 65 Brandon Bantz; 33 Henry Blanco; 63 Jesús Montero; 35 Humberto Quintero; 7 Kelly Shoppach; 2 Jesús Sucre; 3 Mike Zunino; **Infielders**: 3 Robert Andino; 20 Nick Franklin; 16 Alex Liddi; 5 Brad Miller; 8 Kendrys Morales; 26 Brendan Ryan; 15 Kyle Seager; 17 Justin Smoak; 1 Carlos Triunfel	**Outfielders**: 13 Dustin Ackley; 36 Abraham Almonte; 12 Jason Bay; 9 Endy Chávez; 21 Franklin Gutiérrez; 28 Raúl Ibañez; 38 Michael Morse; 4 Carlos Peguero; 55 Michael Saunders	**Manager**: 22 Eric Wedge; **Coaches**: 29 Mike Brumley (first base); 43 Jeff Datz (third base); 25 Dave Hansen (hitting); 47 Jaime Navarro (bullpen); 62 Jason Phillips (bullpen catcher); 6 Robby Thompson (bench); 48 Carl Willis (pitching); 52 Daren Brown (third base)

== Players stats ==
=== Batting ===
Note: G = Games played; AB = At bats; R = Runs scored; H = Hits; 2B = Doubles; 3B = Triples; HR = Home runs; RBI = Runs batted in; BB = Base on balls; SB = Stolen bases; AVG = Batting average

Player	G	AB	R	H	2B	3B	HR	RBI	BB	SB	AVG
Kyle Seager	160	615	79	160	32	2	22	69	68	9	.260
Kendrys Morales	156	602	64	167	34	0	23	80	49	0	.277
Justin Smoak	131	454	53	108	19	0	20	50	64	0	.238
Raúl Ibañez	124	454	54	110	20	2	29	65	42	0	.242
Michael Saunders	132	406	59	96	23	3	12	46	54	13	.236
Dustin Ackley	113	384	40	97	18	2	4	31	37	2	.253
Nick Franklin	102	369	38	83	20	1	12	45	42	6	.225
Brad Miller	76	306	41	81	11	6	8	36	24	5	.265
Mike Morse	76	283	31	64	13	0	13	27	20	0	.226
Endy Chávez	97	266	22	71	10	0	2	14	9	1	.267
Brendan Ryan	87	260	23	50	10	0	3	21	21	4	.192
Jason Bay	68	206	30	42	6	0	11	20	26	3	.204
Mike Zunino	52	173	22	37	5	0	5	14	16	1	.214
Franklin Gutiérrez	41	145	18	36	7	0	10	24	5	3	.248
Kelly Shoppach	35	107	11	21	7	0	3	9	12	0	.196
Jesús Montero	29	101	6	21	1	1	3	9	8	0	.208
Henry Blanco	35	96	8	12	2	0	3	14	10	0	.125
Robert Andino	29	76	5	14	4	0	0	4	7	0	.184
Abraham Almonte	25	72	10	19	4	0	2	9	6	1	.264
Humberto Quintero	22	67	5	15	1	0	2	4	3	0	.224
Carlos Triunfel	17	44	1	6	1	0	0	2	0	0	.136
Jesús Sucre	8	26	1	5	0	0	0	3	2	0	.192
Alex Liddi	8	17	0	1	1	0	0	0	1	0	.059
Carlos Peguero	2	6	1	2	0	0	1	1	1	1	.333
Brandon Bantz	1	2	0	0	0	0	0	0	0	0	.000
Pitcher Totals	162	21	2	0	0	0	0	0	2	0	.000
Team totals	162	5558	624	1318	249	17	188	597	529	49	.237

=== Pitching ===
Note: W = Wins; L = Losses; ERA = Earned run average; G = Games pitched; GS = Games started; SV = Saves; IP = Innings pitched; H = Hits allowed; R = Runs allowed; ER = Earned runs allowed; BB = Walks allowed; SO = Strikeouts

Player	W	L	ERA	G	GS	SV	IP	H	R	ER	BB	SO
Hisashi Iwakuma	14	6	2.66	33	33	0	219.2	179	69	65	42	185
Félix Hernández	12	10	3.04	31	31	0	204.1	185	74	69	46	216
Joe Saunders	11	16	5.26	32	32	0	183.0	232	117	107	61	107
Aaron Harang	5	11	5.76	22	22	0	120.1	133	81	77	28	87
Brandon Maurer	5	8	6.30	22	14	0	90.0	114	66	63	27	70
Erasmo Ramírez	5	3	4.98	14	13	0	72.1	79	44	40	26	57
Yoervis Medina	4	6	2.91	63	0	1	68.0	49	22	22	40	71
Charlie Furbush	2	6	3.74	71	0	0	65.0	48	33	27	29	80
Carter Capps	3	3	5.49	53	0	0	59.0	73	37	36	23	66
Tom Wilhelmsen	0	3	4.12	59	0	24	59.0	45	28	27	33	45
Danny Farquhar	0	3	4.20	46	0	16	55.2	44	29	26	22	79
Óliver Pérez	3	3	3.74	61	0	2	53.0	50	23	22	26	74
Blake Beavan	0	2	6.13	12	2	0	39.2	46	27	27	8	27
Jeremy Bonderman	1	3	4.93	7	7	0	38.1	40	23	21	17	16
Lucas Luetge	1	3	4.86	35	0	0	37.0	42	22	20	16	27
Héctor Noesí	0	1	6.59	12	1	0	27.1	42	21	20	12	21
James Paxton	3	0	1.50	4	4	0	24.0	15	5	4	7	21
Taijuan Walker	1	0	3.60	3	3	0	15.0	11	7	6	4	12
Bobby LaFromboise	0	1	5.91	10	0	0	10.2	12	8	7	4	11
Chance Ruffin	0	2	8.38	9	0	0	9.2	14	10	9	5	15
Stephen Pryor	0	0	0.00	7	0	0	7.1	3	0	0	1	7
Kameron Loe	1	1	10.80	4	0	0	6.2	11	8	8	1	3
Team totals	71	91	4.31	162	162	43	1465.0	1467	754	702	478	1297

== Farm system ==
Level	Team	League	Manager
AAA	Tacoma Rainiers	Pacific Coast League	Daren Brown and John Stearns
AA	Jackson Generals	Southern League	Jim Pankovits
A	High Desert Mavericks	California League	Jim Horner
A	Clinton LumberKings	Midwest League	Eddie Menchaca
A-Short Season	Everett AquaSox	Northwest League	Rob Mummau
Rookie	Pulaski Mariners	Appalachian League	Chris Prieto
Rookie	AZL Mariners	Arizona League	Darrin Garner

LEAGUE CHAMPIONS: Pulaski
