= Brandon Bantz =

American baseball player (born 1987)

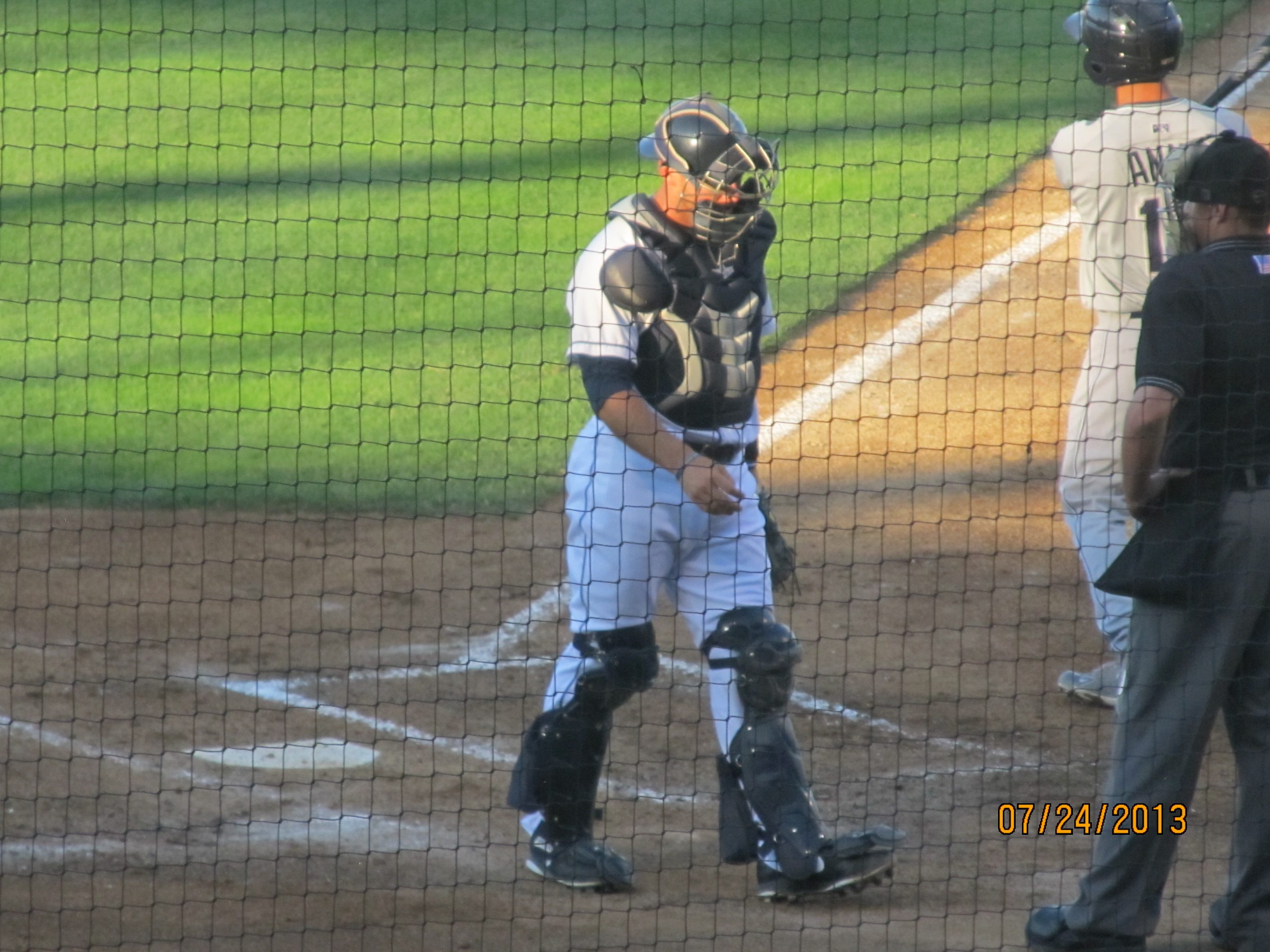
- Bantz with the Seattle Mariners in 2013
- Catcher
- Born: January 7, 1987 (age 39); Mansfield, Texas, U.S.
- Batted: Right Threw: Right

MLB debut
- June 8, 2013, for the Seattle Mariners

Last MLB appearance
- June 8, 2013, for the Seattle Mariners

MLB statistics
- Batting average: .000
- Home runs: 0
- Runs batted in: 0
- Stats at Baseball Reference

Teams
- Seattle Mariners (2013)

Brandon Bantz (born January 7, 1987) is an American former professional baseball catcher. He played in one Major League Baseball (MLB) game for the Seattle Mariners in 2013. He is a coach for the Utah Talons of the Athletes Unlimited Softball League.

== Playing career ==
=== Amateur ===
Bantz attended Mansfield High School in Mansfield, Texas, where he was teammates with Jordan Walden. He played college baseball for the Dallas Baptist Patriots. In 2008, he played collegiate summer baseball with the Bourne Braves of the Cape Cod Baseball League.

=== Seattle Mariners ===
The Seattle Mariners selected Bantz in the 30th round with the 893rd overall selection of the 2009 MLB draft. Bantz hit his first-ever walk-off home run with the Everett AquaSox that August.

Bantz was promoted to the major leagues for the only time on June 5, 2013, serving as the backup catcher to Kelly Shoppach due to injuries to Jesús Sucre and Jesús Montero. Bantz played once for the Mariners, starting at catcher in his only game on June 8. He received a standing ovation from the Safeco Field crowd before his first plate appearance, with home plate umpire Laz Díaz telling him to wave to the crowd. At the plate, he faced Andy Pettitte twice, grounding out once and striking out once before Endy Chávez replaced him as a pinch hitter in the eighth inning. Behind the plate, Bantz caught Joe Saunders, Danny Farquhar and Óliver Pérez. He allowed stolen bases to Robinson Canó and Jayson Nix.

Bantz was designated for assignment by the Mariners on June 11. He cleared waivers and was sent outright to the Triple-A Tacoma Rainiers on June 13. He spent the rest of the season with the Double-A Jackson Generals Tacoma, slashing .219/.282/.307 with three home runs and 15 runs batted in (RBIs). One of his home runs was a walk-off for Jackson. The Mariners released Bantz on March 27, 2014.

=== Later career ===
On April 1, 2014, Bantz signed as a minor league contract with the Washington Nationals. In 22 games for the Double-A Harrisburg Senators, he slashed .271/.320/.343 with six RBI. The Nationals released Bantz on May 23.

Bantz signed with the Long Island Ducks of the independent Atlantic League on July 7.

On January 19, 2015, Bantz signed a minor league contract with the Miami Marlins organization. In 68 games split between the Double-A Jacksonville Suns and Triple-A New Orleans Zephyrs, he batted a combined .245/.318/.359 with four home runs and 25 RBI. Bantz elected free agency following the season on November 6.

== Post-playing career ==
Following his playing career, Bantz opened a baseball training facility in Denver, Colorado.

Bantz is an assistant coach for the Utah Talons of the Athletes Unlimited Softball League.
