= Robert Andino =

American baseball player (born 1984)

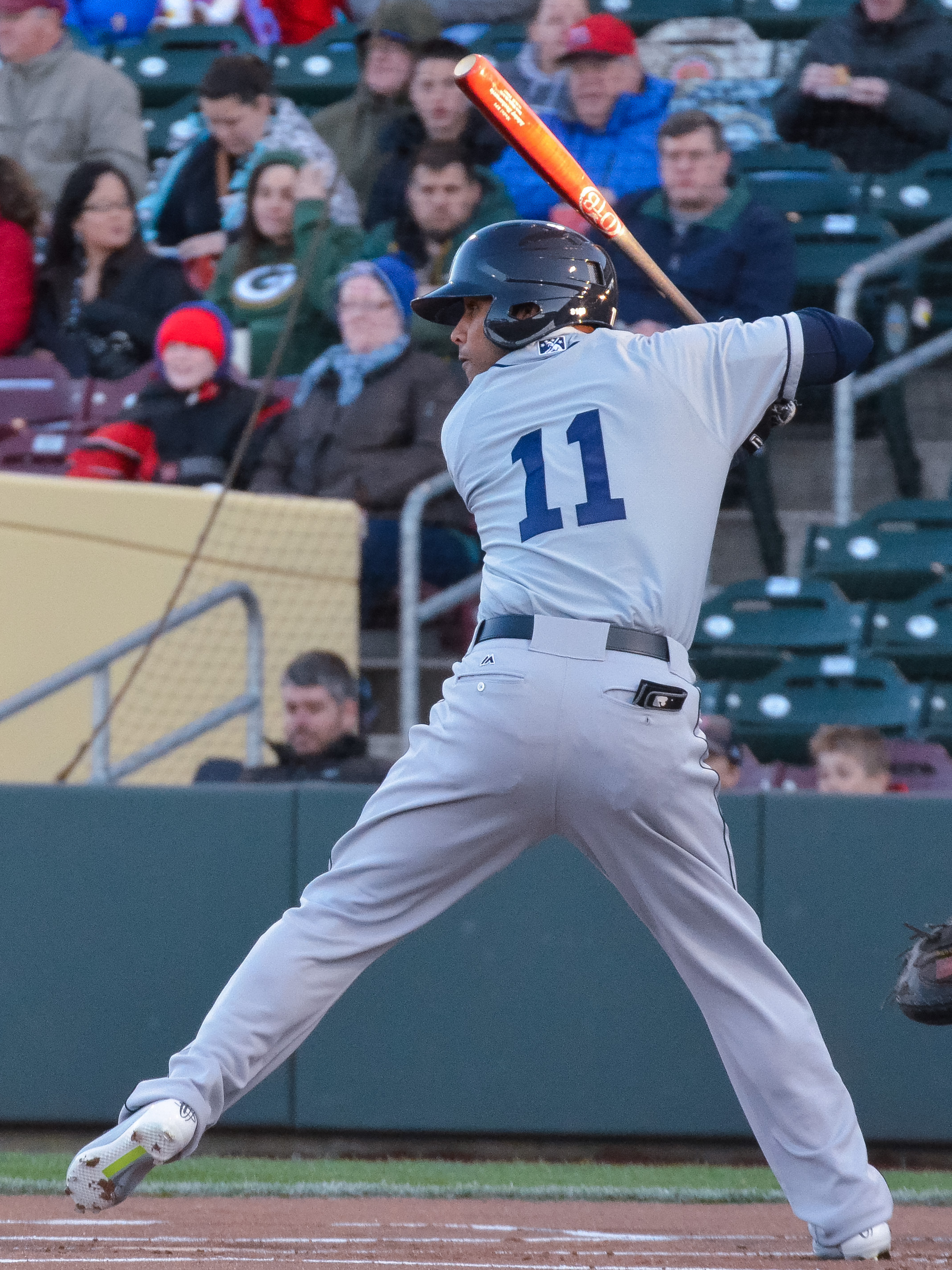
- Andino with the New Orleans Zephyrs in 2016
- Infielder
- Born: April 25, 1984 (age 42); Miami, Florida, U.S.
- Batted: Right Threw: Right

MLB debut
- September 4, 2005, for the Florida Marlins

Last MLB appearance
- September 10, 2016, for the Miami Marlins

MLB statistics
- Batting average: .233
- Home runs: 18
- Runs batted in: 97
- Stats at Baseball Reference

Teams
- Florida Marlins (2005–2008); Baltimore Orioles (2009–2012); Seattle Mariners (2013); Miami Marlins (2016)

Robert Lazaro Andino (born April 25, 1984) is a Cuban-American former professional baseball infielder. He played in Major League Baseball (MLB) for the Baltimore Orioles, Florida/Miami Marlins, and Seattle Mariners.

== Baseball career ==
=== Florida Marlins ===
Andino was selected in the second round (52nd overall) of the 2002 MLB draft by the Florida Marlins out of Miami Southridge High School.

He was promoted to the Marlins for the first time on September 2, 2005. He made his major-league debut two days later, when he replaced Álex González at shortstop in the eighth inning of a 7–1 loss to the New York Mets at Dolphins Stadium. His only at bat was a groundout to shortstop José Reyes to end the game. His first hit in the majors was a ground-rule double off Vicente Padilla in the fourth inning of a 10–2 defeat at home to the Philadelphia Phillies on September 17. The Marlins initially saw him as their "shortstop of the future", but other players, including Hanley Ramírez, knocked him out of that role.

On April 1, 2008, Andino hit a walk-off home run in the 10th inning off New York Mets reliever Matt Wise for his first career home run.

=== Baltimore Orioles ===
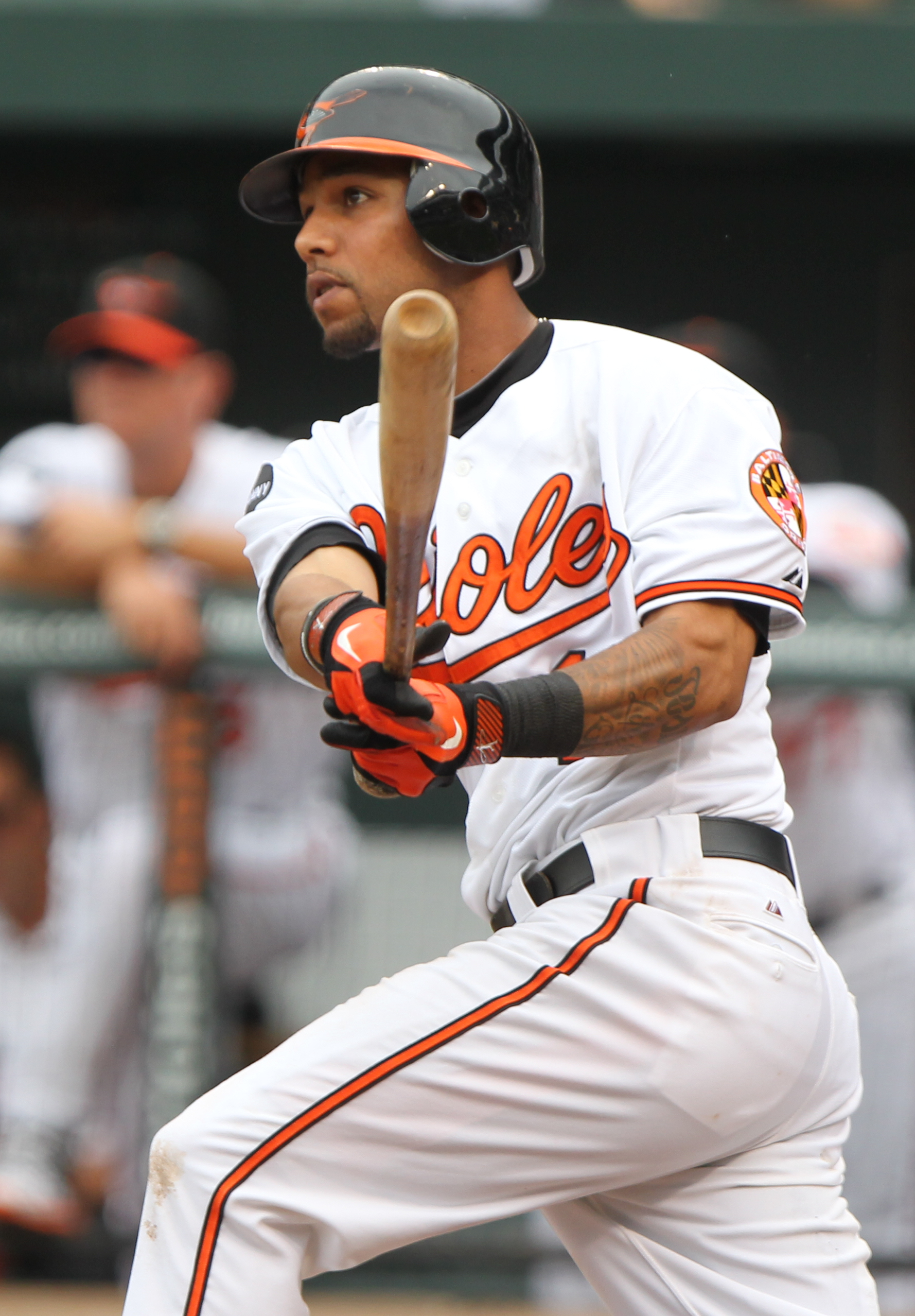
Andino batting for the Baltimore Orioles in 2011

In an exchange of players out of minor league options, Andino was traded to the Baltimore Orioles for Hayden Penn on April 1, 2009. He made his first appearance for the Orioles on April 9, 2009, pinch-hitting for César Izturis.

He made a barehanded catch of a Justin Morneau pop fly in foul territory during the sixth inning of a 6–1 win over the Minnesota Twins at Target Field on August 24, 2011. He had slightly overrun the ball while approaching the tarpaulin roll parked against the fence on the third-base side.

During the last two weeks of the 2011 campaign, Andino had three clutch hits that helped prevent the Boston Red Sox from clinching the American League Wild Card. The first was a two-out bases-clearing double down the right-field line off Jonathan Papelbon in the eighth inning of a 7–5 win at Fenway Park on September 20. Six nights later, on September 26, he became the first Oriole to achieve an inside-the-park home run at Camden Yards with a three-run shot off Josh Beckett in the sixth inning of a 6–3 triumph. With runners on second and third and two outs, he sent the ball to deep straightaway center field where it initially landed in Jacoby Ellsbury's glove. It was jarred loose when Ellsbury collided with the fence. Andino was able to score standing up when the relay throw skipped past Red Sox catcher Jarrod Saltalamacchia. The feat was witnessed by his father, Robert Sr., who was attending a professional game involving his son for the first time. Andino struck against Papelbon again with a two-out game-winning single to left field in the ninth inning of the regular-season-ending 4–3 victory at home on September 28. This walk-off hit ultimately resulted in the Red Sox losing a spot in the playoffs, as mere minutes later the Tampa Bay Rays won on a walk-off home run by Evan Longoria against the New York Yankees, to clinch the playoff spot the Red Sox previously held. His clutch performances were dubbed by the Boston sports media as "The Curse of the Andino", an obvious pun on the Curse of the Bambino.

On September 7, 2012, Andino hit his career-high seventh home run of the season against New York Yankees pitcher Cody Eppley.

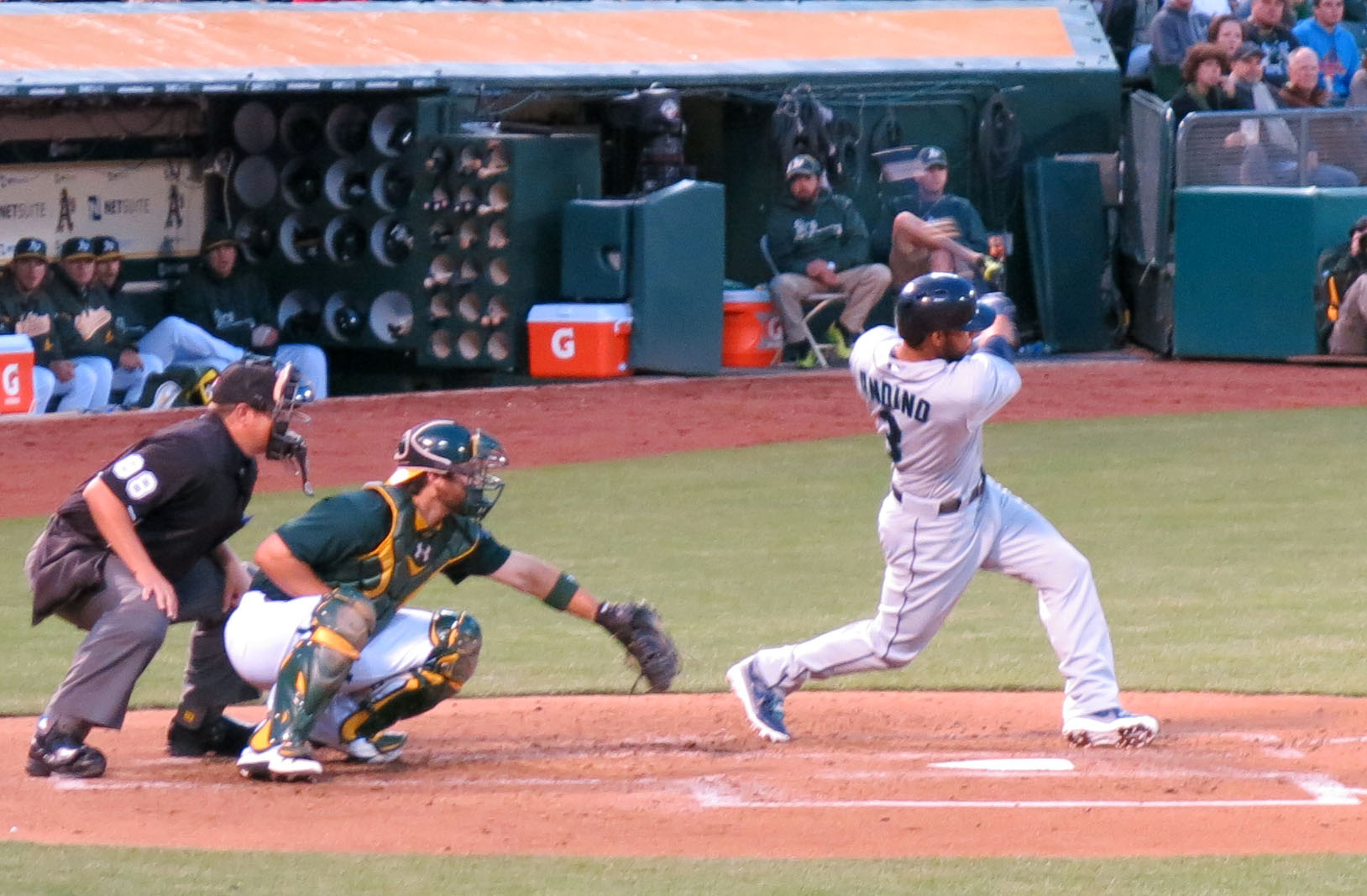
Andino (right) batting for the Seattle Mariners in 2013

=== Seattle Mariners ===
Andino was traded to the Seattle Mariners for Trayvon Robinson on November 20, 2012. On May 24, 2013, he was designated for assignment to make room for catcher Jesús Sucre. He was outrighted to the Tacoma Rainiers on May 27.

=== Pittsburgh Pirates ===
On July 31, 2013, he was traded to the Pittsburgh Pirates for a player to be named later or cash. He was assigned to the Triple-A Indianapolis Indians, where he finished the season.

On January 7, 2014, the Pirates signed Andino to a minor league contract with an invitation to major league spring training. He did not make the team and spent the season with the Triple–A Indianapolis Indians, becoming a free agent at the season's end.

=== Somerset Patriots ===
On March 31, 2015, Andino signed with the Somerset Patriots of the Atlantic League of Professional Baseball, where he spent the 2015 season. In 123 games he hit .248/.302/.339 with 4 home runs, 56 RBIs and 5 stolen bases.

=== Miami Marlins ===
On December 28, 2015, Andino signed a minor league contract with the Miami Marlins. He had his contract selected by the Marlins on August 14, 2016. He appeared in 13 games for the Marlins, and amassed a .292 batting average with one RBI. Andino was designated for assignment by Miami following the acquisition of Odrisamer Despaigne on September 15.

=== Baltimore Orioles (second stint) ===
On February 6, 2017, Andino signed a minor league contract with the Baltimore Orioles organization. On May 31, Andino was suspended for 50 games for testing positive for Adderall. In 49 games for the Triple–A Norfolk Tides, Andino hit .234/.282/.375 with 6 home runs and 23 RBI. He elected free agency following the season on November 6.
