= Brandon Maurer =

American baseball player (born 1990)

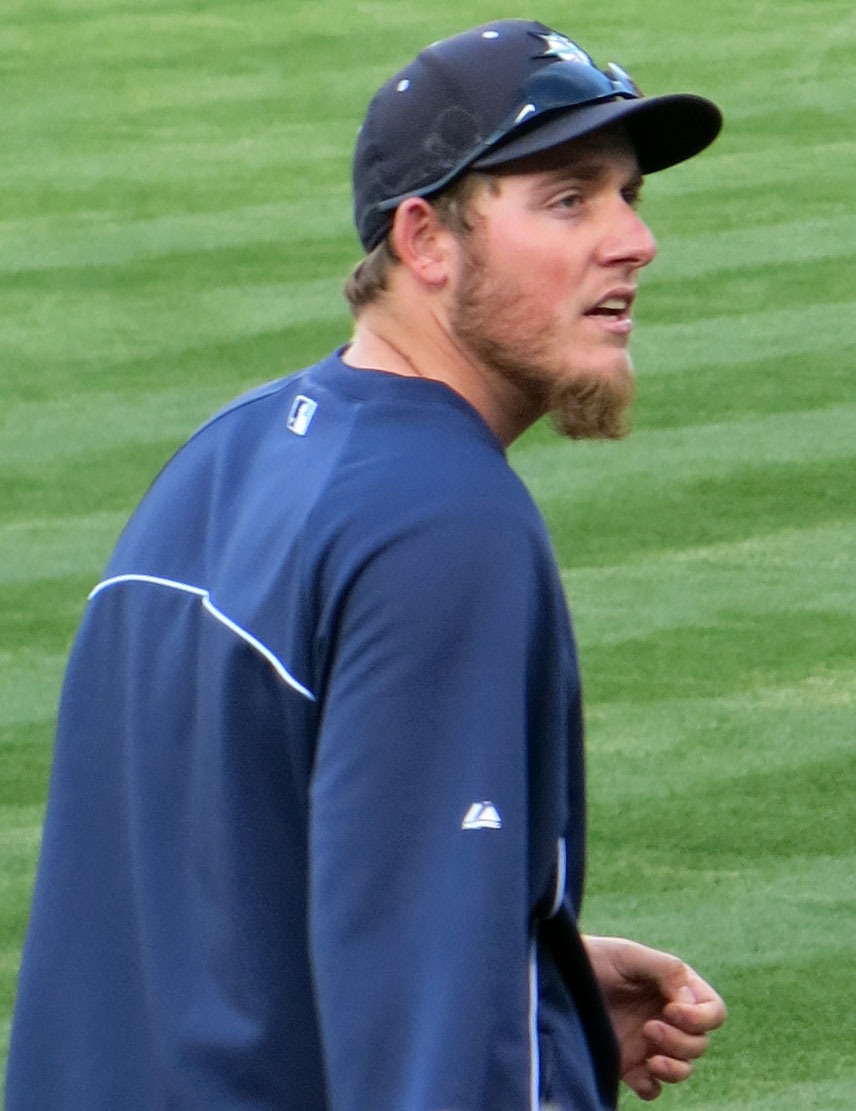
- Maurer with the Seattle Mariners
- Pitcher
- Born: July 3, 1990 (age 35); Newport Beach, California, U.S.
- Batted: Right Threw: Right

MLB debut
- April 4, 2013, for the Seattle Mariners

Last MLB appearance
- September 25, 2018, for the Kansas City Royals

MLB statistics
- Win–loss record: 16–31
- Earned run average: 5.36
- Strikeouts: 326
- Stats at Baseball Reference

Teams
- Seattle Mariners (2013–2014); San Diego Padres (2015–2017); Kansas City Royals (2017–2018)

Brandon Eugene Maurer (born July 3, 1990) is an American former professional baseball pitcher. He played in Major League Baseball (MLB) for the Seattle Mariners, San Diego Padres, and Kansas City Royals.

From Costa Mesa, California, Maurer pitched at Orange Lutheran High School. The Mariners selected Maurer in the 23rd round of the 2008 MLB draft. After being overshadowed by other prospects, Maurer had a strong spring training showing with the Mariners in 2013 and made the team's Opening Day starting rotation. The Mariners traded Maurer to the Padres after the 2014 season, and he became a relief pitcher. The Padres traded Maurer to the Royals in 2017.

== Amateur career ==
Maurer competed in Little League Baseball in Costa Mesa, California as a pitcher. On July 30, 2002, at the age of 12, Maurer pitched a perfect game in a Little League all-star game.

Maurer attended Orange Lutheran High School in Orange, California. Maurer played for the school's baseball team, which competes in the Trinity League, within the Southern Section of the California Interscholastic Federation. In 2007, his junior year, Maurer was used as a relief pitcher and had a 0.54 earned run average (ERA) and four saves. As a senior in 2008, he earned second-team All-Trinity League honors and helped Orange Lutheran finish second in the league. Though he was overshadowed by teammates Gerrit Cole and Aaron Gates, he earned notice from Major League Baseball teams. He accepted a scholarship from the Cal State Long Beach, to play college baseball for the Long Beach State Dirtbags.

== Professional career ==
=== Seattle Mariners ===
The Seattle Mariners drafted Maurer in the 23rd round, with the 702nd overall selection of the 2008 Major League Baseball draft. Maurer signed with the Mariners. Upon joining the Arizona League Mariners of the Rookie-level Arizona League, he threw as fast as 93 miles per hour (150 km/h), with the team expecting that he would increase his velocity by approximately 2 to 3 miles per hour (3.2–4.8 km/h) by adding 20 to 30 pounds (9.1–13.6 kg). By 2011, Maurer could throw as hard as 96 miles per hour (154 km/h).

In 2009, Maurer pitched for the Pulaski Mariners of the Rookie-level Appalachian League. He pitched for the Clinton LumberKings of the Single-A Midwest League in 2010, and the Adelaide Bite of the Australian Baseball League (ABL) in the winter of 2010–11, reaching the ABL championship series. Maurer started the 2011 season with the LumberKings, and was promoted to the High Desert Mavericks of the High-A California League in May. Following his second start with High Desert, he was named the California League Pitcher of the Week for the week ending June 1.

Heading into the 2012 season, scouts viewed Maurer as a "sleeper" prospect. Maurer pitched for the Jackson Generals of the Double-A Southern League in 2012. Though overshadowed by teammates Danny Hultzen and Taijuan Walker, Maurer was named the league's Most Outstanding Pitcher after going 9–2 with a 3.20 earned run average with 117 strikeouts in 137 2/3 innings pitched. On November 20, 2012, Maurer was added to the Mariners' 40-man roster to be protected from the Rule 5 draft.

In spring training in 2013, Maurer competed with Erasmo Ramírez, Jeremy Bonderman, and Blake Beavan for the final two spots in the Mariners' five-man starting rotation, behind Félix Hernández, Hisashi Iwakuma, and Joe Saunders. Allowing only two runs in 20 innings with 22 strikeouts and six walks in the Cactus League, Maurer made the Mariners' 25-man roster and rotation, skipping Triple-A. Maurer became the first member of the Mariners' 2008 draft class to reach the major leagues and the first starter to skip Triple-A and debut for the Mariners since John Cummings and Mike Hampton in 1993. He reached MLB before more heralded prospects, such as Walker, Hultzen, and James Paxton. In his major league debut on April 4, he allowed six runs in six innings to the Oakland Athletics, including on home runs by Yoenis Céspedes and Josh Reddick, in a loss. After a second poor performance, Maurer earned his first win in his third start, on April 14. In his rookie season, he went 5–8 with a 6.30 ERA, starting 14 of his 22 games with the Mariners. He had similar poor results in 2014, going 1–4 with a 4.65 ERA in 38 games, 7 of them starts.

=== San Diego Padres ===
On December 30, 2014, the Mariners traded Maurer to the San Diego Padres in exchange for Seth Smith. In the first half of the 2015 season, Maurer pitched to a 2.11 ERA. His performance diminished in the second half as he suffered from shoulder inflammation. Maurer's 2015 season ended with a 7–4 record and 3.00 ERA in 53 games.

Maurer entered spring training in 2016 as a candidate for the starting rotation. The Padres opted to keep Maurer in the bullpen for the 2016 season. The Padres named Maurer their closer after the team traded away Fernando Rodney to the Miami Marlins on June 30, 2016. Maurer held the role for the rest of the season, saving 13 games. He entered 2017 as the incumbent closer for the Padres, saving20 games for the Padres despite having an ERA of 5.72 although his fielding independent pitching (FIP) had him with a 3.23 ERA. In his three seasons with the Padres, Maurer had an 8–13 record with 33 saves.

=== Kansas City Royals ===
On July 24, 2017, the Padres traded Maurer, Ryan Buchter, and Trevor Cahill to the Kansas City Royals for Matt Strahm, Travis Wood, and Esteury Ruiz. He was outrighted to the Triple-A Omaha Storm Chasers on May 3, 2018. In 37 games in 2018, Maurer registered an ERA of 7.76 in 31 1/3 innings. He became a free agent on November 2.

=== Pittsburgh Pirates ===
On January 30, 2019, Maurer signed a minor league contract with the Pittsburgh Pirates organization. In 8 games split between the Low-A West Virginia Black Bears and Triple-A Indianapolis Indians, he compiled a 3–0 record and 2.89 ERA with 13 strikeouts across 9 1/3 innings pitched. Maurer elected free agency following the season on November 4.

== Personal life ==
Maurer is married. He has been described as a "laid back California surfer type".
