= Yoervis Medina =

Venezuelan baseball player (1988–2025)

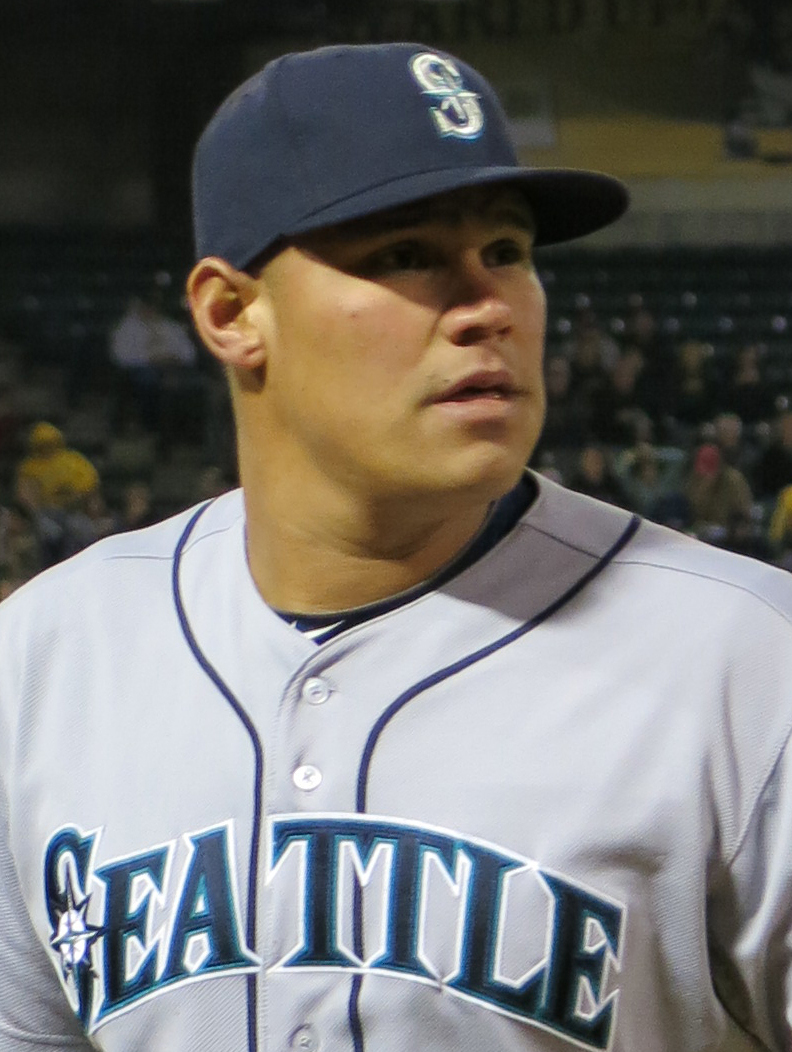
- Medina with the Seattle Mariners in 2014
- Pitcher
- Born: July 27, 1988; Puerto Cabello, Venezuela
- Died: October 30, 2025 (aged 37); Naguanagua Municipality, Venezuela
- Batted: Right Threw: Right

MLB debut
- April 16, 2013, for the Seattle Mariners

Last MLB appearance
- July 26, 2015, for the Chicago Cubs

MLB statistics
- Win–loss record: 10–9
- Earned run average: 3.08
- Strikeouts: 147
- Stats at Baseball Reference

Teams
- Seattle Mariners (2013–2015); Chicago Cubs (2015)

Yoervis José Medina (July 27, 1988 – October 30, 2025) was a Venezuelan professional baseball pitcher. He played in Major League Baseball (MLB) for the Seattle Mariners and Chicago Cubs from 2013 to 2015.

== Career ==
=== Seattle Mariners ===
From 2006 to 2009, Medina played for the VSL Mariners in the Venezuelan Summer League. In 2006, he made 17 appearances, four of which were starts. That season, he went 3–4 with a 3.60 earned run average (ERA). In 2007, he went 4–2 with a 3.42 ERA in 16 games (six starts). He was used almost entirely as a reliever in 2008, going 4–3 with a 1.79 ERA in 17 games (one start). In 2009, he went 3–4 with a 2.65 ERA in 15 games (13 starts).

Medina moved to the United States for the 2010 season, playing for the Everett AquaSox, Clinton LumberKings and Tacoma Rainiers and going a combined 92 with a 3.17 ERA in 15 starts. In 82⅓ innings, he struck out 92 batters while walking 31.

Medina made his Major League Baseball debut with the Seattle Mariners on April 16, 2013. Medina made 63 appearances for Seattle during his rookie campaign, compiling a 4–6 record and 2.91 ERA with 71 strikeouts and one saves over 68 innings of work.

Medina made 66 appearances out of the bullpen for Seattle in 2014, with a 5–3 record, 2.68 ERA, and 60 strikeouts across 57 innings pitched. He pitched in 12 games for the Mariners in 2015, posting a 1–0 record and 3.00 ERA with nine strikeouts and one save over 12 innings of work.

=== Chicago Cubs ===
On May 19, 2015, Medina was traded to the Chicago Cubs for catcher Welington Castillo. He was subsequently optioned to the Triple-A Iowa Cubs. Medina made five appearances for Chicago, recording a 7.00 ERA with 7 strikeouts across 9 innings of work. He was designated for assignment following the acquisition of Brendan Ryan on December 17.

=== Philadelphia Phillies ===
Medina was claimed off waivers by the Pittsburgh Pirates on December 23, 2015.

On February 3, 2016, Medina was traded to the Philadelphia Phillies in exchange for pitcher Jesse Biddle. He made three scoreless appearances for the rookie-level Gulf Coast League Phillies, striking out four in four innings of work. Medina was released by the Phillies organization on July 3.

=== International leagues ===
After ending his American career, Medina continued to pitch in the Venezuelan winter league, also pitching in the Nicaraguan winter league in 2021–2022

On June 9, 2023, Medina signed with the Senago Baseball Club of the Italian Baseball League (IBL). In seven starts for Senago, he struggled to an 0–6 record and 8.01 ERA with 31 strikeouts across 30 1/3 innings pitched.

On April 12, 2024, Medina signed with Draci Brno of the Czech Baseball Extraliga. He was 4–1 with a 2.11 ERA in 11 games.

== Death ==
Medina died of a heart attack, while driving in Naguanagua Municipality, Venezuela, on October 30, 2025. He was 37.

== See also ==
- List of Major League Baseball players from Venezuela
