= Taijuan Walker =

American baseball player (born 1992)

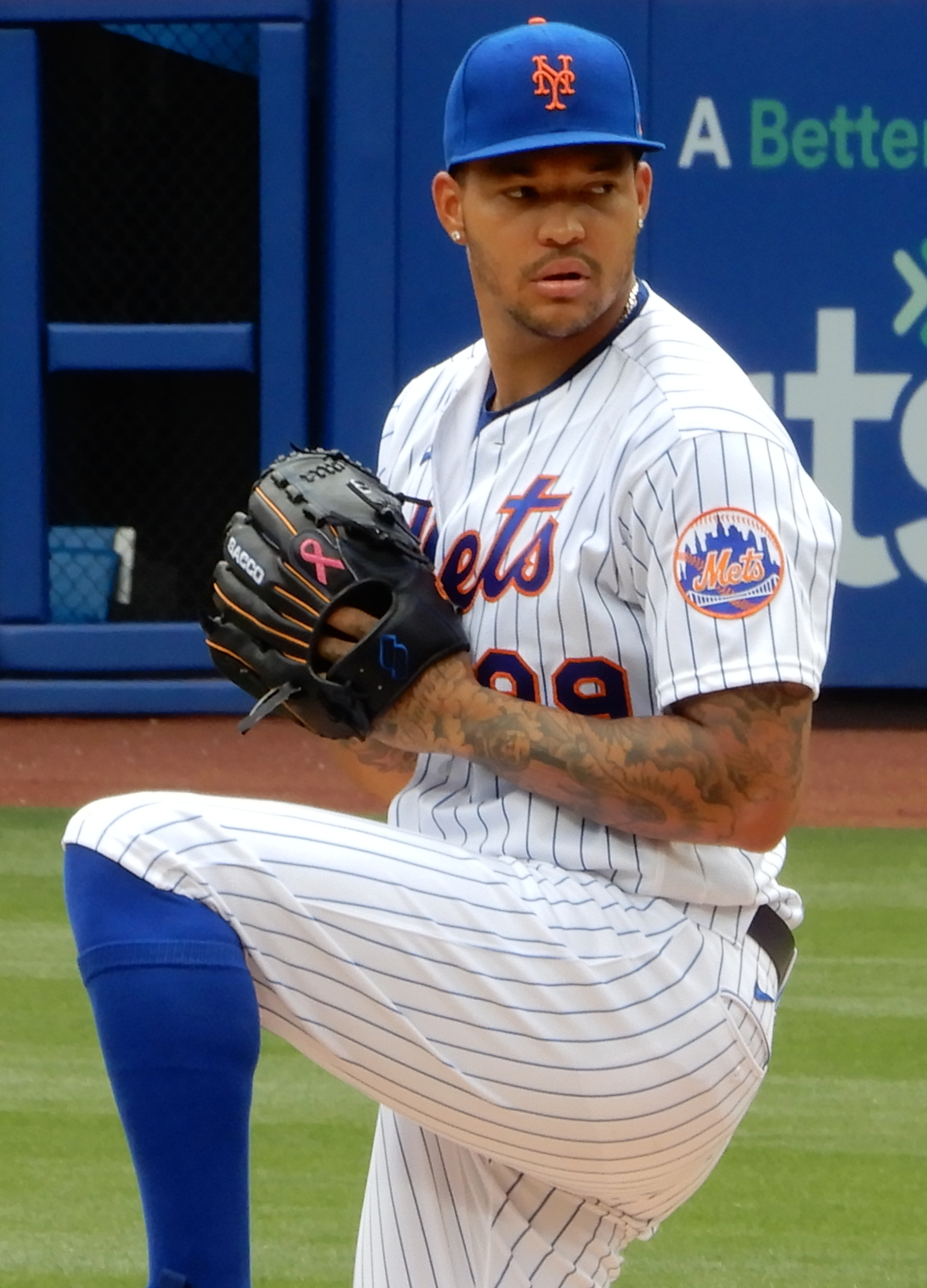
- Walker with the New York Mets in 2021

Free agent
- Pitcher
- Born: August 13, 1992 (age 33); Shreveport, Louisiana, U.S.
- Bats: Switch Throws: Right

MLB debut
- August 30, 2013, for the Seattle Mariners

MLB statistics (through April 22, 2026)
- Win–loss record: 78–75
- Earned run average: 4.27
- Strikeouts: 1,105
- Stats at Baseball Reference

Teams
- Seattle Mariners (2013–2016); Arizona Diamondbacks (2017–2019); Seattle Mariners (2020); Toronto Blue Jays (2020); New York Mets (2021–2022); Philadelphia Phillies (2023–2026)

Career highlights and awards
- All-Star (2021)
Medals
Men's baseball
Representing Mexico
World Baseball Classic
Bronze medal – third place	2023 Miami	Team

Taijuan Emmanuel Walker (born August 13, 1992) is an American professional baseball pitcher who is a free agent. He has previously played in Major League Baseball (MLB) for the Seattle Mariners, Arizona Diamondbacks, Toronto Blue Jays, New York Mets, and Philadelphia Phillies. Walker made his MLB debut in 2013 and was an All-Star in 2021. He has played for the Mexican national baseball team.

== Amateur career ==
Born in Shreveport, Louisiana, Walker's original love was basketball, until he began playing baseball at the age of 11. Walker attended Yucaipa High School in Yucaipa, California, where he was a pitcher and shortstop, as well as a two-sport athlete.

== Professional career ==
=== Seattle Mariners ===
The Seattle Mariners selected Walker in the first round, with the 43rd overall pick, of the 2010 MLB draft. Walker and the Mariners agreed to a deal that included an $800,000 signing bonus. He made four appearances for the rookie-level Arizona League Mariners, all in relief, and went 1–1 with a 1.29 earned run average (ERA). Walker was listed as one of the Mariners' top 10 prospects for the 2011 season, ranked fourth according to Baseball America. Prior to the 2012 season, he was ranked the second best prospect in the Mariners organization and the 20th best overall. Walker was selected to play in the 2012 All-Star Futures Game.

After Walker pitched to a 5–3 win–loss record and a 3.61 ERA with 64 strikeouts in 57 1/3 innings pitched for the Tacoma Rainiers of the Triple-A Pacific Coast League, the Mariners promoted Walker on August 30, 2013. Walker pitched 5 innings against the Houston Astros, and yielded just 2 hits and struck out 2. Walker was called up when rosters expanded in September 2013. He started 3 games, finishing the season with a 3.60 ERA in 15 innings. On September 24, 2014, Walker pitched his first MLB complete game, losing 1-0 to the Toronto Blue Jays at Rogers Centre.

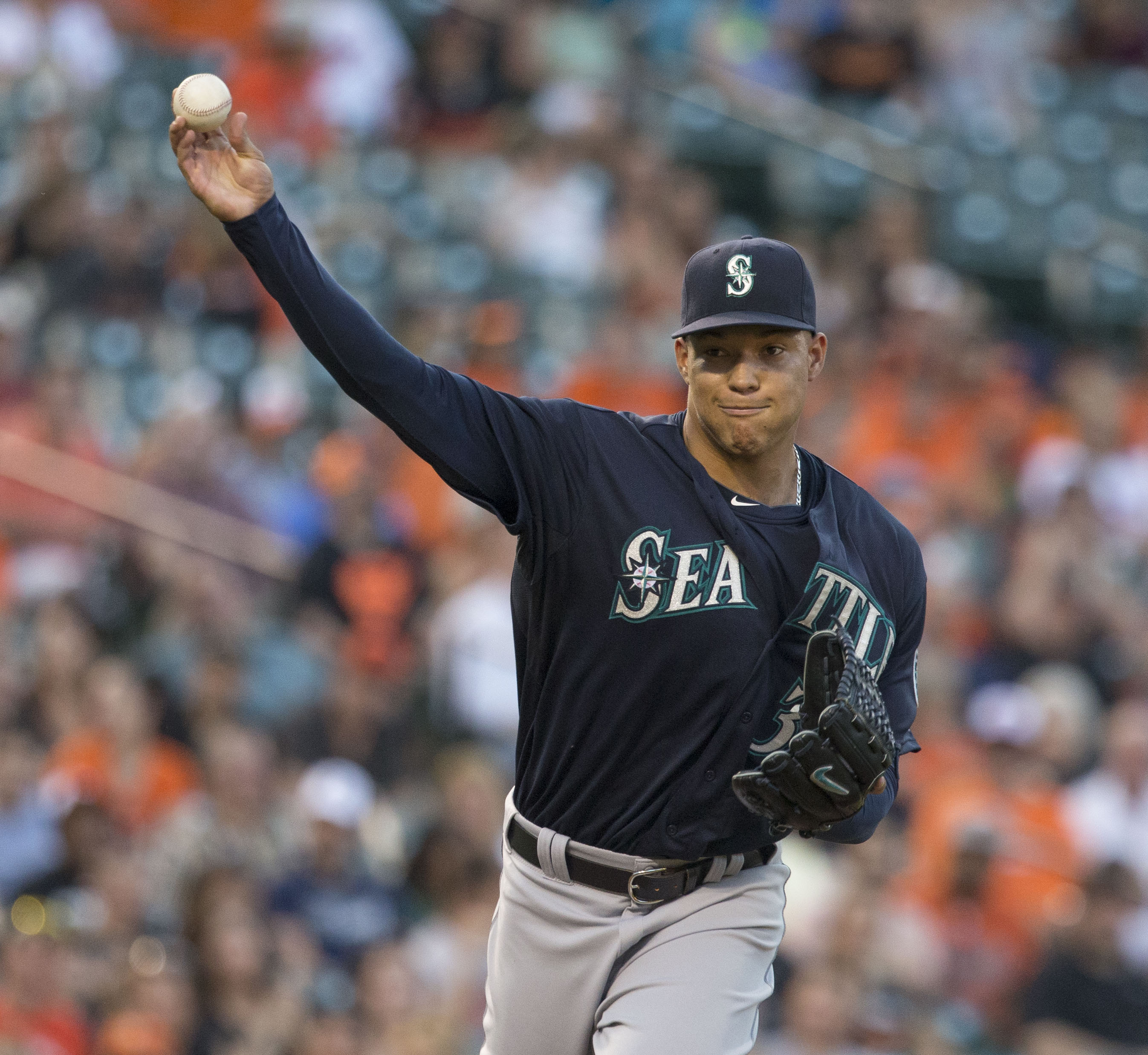
Walker with the Mariners in 2015

Walker began the 2015 season as a member of the Mariners' starting rotation. In his first start, at Oakland, Walker gave up nine runs in 3 1/3 innings. He followed that outing by giving up 5 runs in 4 innings against the Dodgers, causing some to question whether or not Walker was ready for the big leagues. Walker continued to struggle, pitching more than 6 innings only once through his first nine starts. However, Walker won five straight starts in June and July, improving his record from 2–6 to 7–6. Walker struggled after winning five straight, going 0–1 with an 8.02 ERA, but on July 31 threw a complete game one-hitter (his only hit was a home run by Miguel Sano) against the Minnesota Twins at Target Field. This time, his offense backed him up, as he won 6–1, striking out 11, and only needing 100 pitches to do so. Overall, Walker finished the 2015 season with an 11–8 record despite posting a 4.56 ERA in 29 starts.

Throughout the first half of the 2016 season, Walker battled with a foot injury. He was placed on the 15-day disabled list on two occasions. He began the second half of the season on the disabled list. Before the all-star break, Walker had a 4–7 record despite a 3.66 ERA and 80 strikeouts in 86 innings. Walker was optioned to Triple-A on August 8, 2016. On September 13, 2016, Walker pitched his first career complete-game shutout in an 8–0 Mariners win over the Los Angeles Angels of Anaheim. He carried a perfect game into the sixth inning and a no-hitter into the seventh, finishing the game allowing no walks and three hits while striking out eleven batters.

=== Arizona Diamondbacks ===
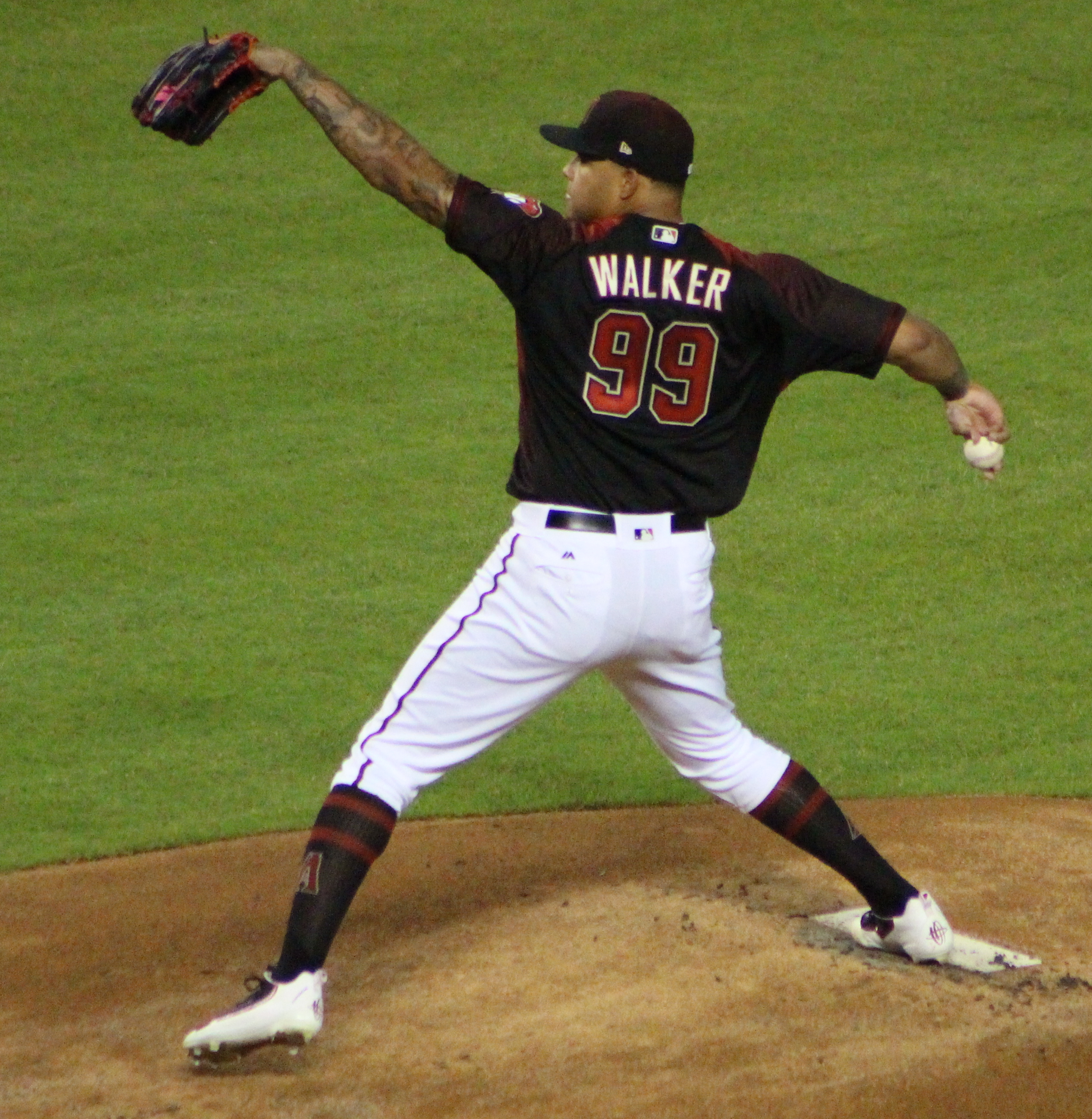
Walker in 2017

On November 23, 2016, the Mariners traded Walker and Ketel Marte to the Arizona Diamondbacks for Jean Segura, Mitch Haniger, and Zac Curtis. In 2017, his first season in Arizona, Walker made 28 starts, pitching to a 9–9 record in 157 innings.

On April 15, 2018, Walker was placed on the 10-day disabled list due to right forearm tightness. Two days later, on April 17, it was revealed that Walker was diagnosed with a UCL injury in his right elbow. On April 18, it was revealed that Walker had a partial tear of the UCL in his right elbow. The injury required Tommy John surgery, ending his season. Following his surgery, Walker appeared in one game for the Diamondbacks, the final game of the 2019 season. On December 2, Walker was non-tendered by Arizona and became a free agent.

=== Seattle Mariners (second stint) ===
On February 4, 2020, Walker worked out for 20 scouts from major league teams. Walker signed a one-year, $2 million contract to return to the Mariners on February 12. Walker was 2–2 with a 4.00 ERA in five starts to begin the season.

=== Toronto Blue Jays ===
On August 27, 2020, the Mariners traded Walker to the Toronto Blue Jays for a player to be named later or cash considerations. On September 1, Toronto sent Alberto Rodríguez to Seattle to complete the trade. On August 29, he made his Blue Jays debut against the Baltimore Orioles, he threw six scoreless innings, allowing four hits. With Toronto, Walker appeared in 6 games, compiling a 2–1 record with 1.37 ERA and 25 strikeouts in 26 1/3 innings pitched.

=== New York Mets ===
On February 20, 2021, Walker agreed to a two-year, $20 million contract with the New York Mets with a player option for the 2023 season. He was named to the MLB All-Star Game, replacing teammate Jacob deGrom. However, Walker's performance plummeted after the All-Star break; he posted a 7–3 record with a 2.66 ERA in the first half and was 0–8 with a 7.13 ERA in the back half. He finished the season with a 7–11 record overall and a 4.47 ERA in 159 innings.

After hurting himself swinging right-handed, Walker began batting left-handed in August 2021. As a bunter, however, he continued to do so right-handed.

On November 7, 2022, Walker opted out of his contract with the Mets for the 2023 season and elected free agency.

=== Philadelphia Phillies ===
On December 16, 2022, Walker signed a four-year, $72 million contract with the Philadelphia Phillies. He completed the 2023 regular season with a 15–6 record overall and a 4.38 ERA over 31 starts. He did not pitch during the postseason.

Walker began the 2024 season on the injured list due to right shoulder impingement but joined the starting rotation on April 28 after three rehab starts with Triple-A Lehigh Valley IronPigs. He was placed on the injured list again as of June 22 with right index finger inflammation, after posting a 5.60 ERA in his 10 starts of the season and struggling with command over and velocity of his pitches. Upon returning from the injured list in August, Walker continued to struggle and was ultimately moved from the starting rotation to the bullpen as a relief pitcher on August 29.

With the Phillies in 2024, he was 3–7 with a 7.10 ERA, with a WHIP of 1.721, in 19 games. He was in the bottom 1% among MLB pitchers in average exit velocity (91.4 mph), whiff percentage (16.7%), and barrel percentage (13.4%), and in the bottom 3% in strikeout percentage (15.2%) and hard-hit percentage (46.3%).

On May 7, 2025, Walker recorded his first career save after striking out seven over three innings of relief against the Tampa Bay Rays. He returned to the rotation in July. He had a 5–8 record with 86 strikeouts in 123 2/3 innings, starting in 21 of his 34 games. He pitched once in the postseason, allowing one run, two hits, and one walk in 2/3 of an inning in the Phillies' only postseason win.

On April 23, 2026, after recording a 9.13 ERA through five games, the Phillies released Walker.

=== Los Angeles Angels ===
On May 23, 2026, Walker signed a minor league contract with the Los Angeles Angels. He made three starts split between the rookie-level Arizona Complex League Angels and Triple-A Salt Lake Bees, recording a cumulative 2.45 ERA with nine strikeouts across 11 innings of work. Walker was released by Los Angeles on June 7, after he triggered an opt-out clause in his contract. He re-signed with the Angels on a new minor league contract on June 11. After two more starts for Salt Lake, Walker was released by Los Angeles on June 20.

== International career ==
Walker played for Mexico in the 2023 World Baseball Classic. He started against Great Britain on March 14, giving up one hit and striking out eight over four innings.

== Scouting report ==
Walker entered the majors throwing a mid-90s four-seam fastball, a curveball, and a changeup. He has also developed a sinker and cut fastball. He also throws a splitter, which became his primary off-speed pitch in 2022.

== Personal life ==
Walker's father is Black and his mother half-Mexican, half-White. Raised by his single mother, Walker helped care for his younger siblings.

Walker is a fan of the Pokémon and Star Wars franchises.

Walker and his wife have two children, born in July 2017 and November 2020.
