= Joe Saunders =

American baseball player (born 1981)

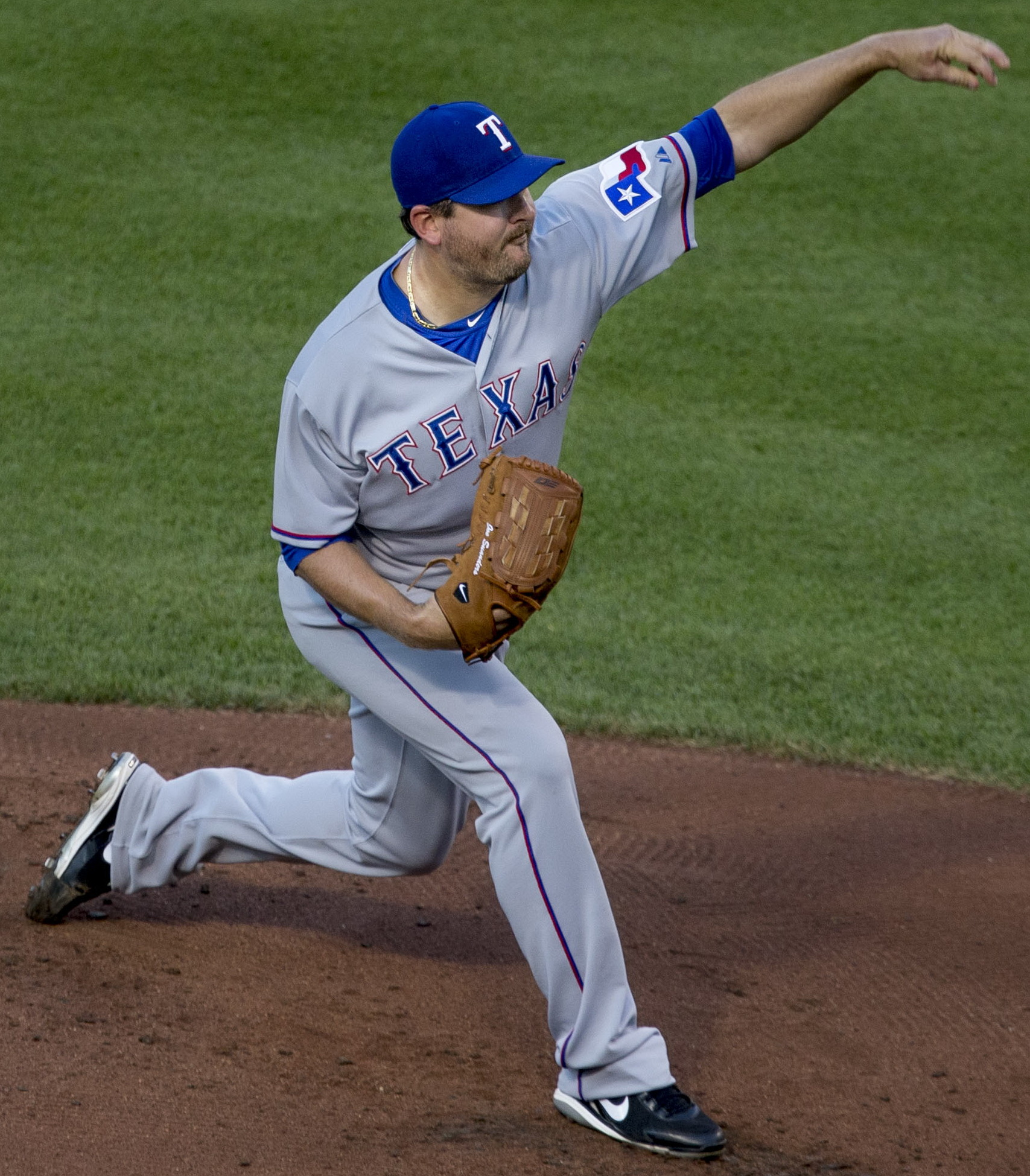
- Saunders with the Texas Rangers
- Pitcher
- Born: June 16, 1981 (age 44); Fairfax, Virginia, U.S.
- Batted: Left Threw: Left

MLB debut
- August 16, 2005, for the Los Angeles Angels of Anaheim

Last MLB appearance
- September 26, 2014, for the Baltimore Orioles

MLB statistics
- Win–loss record: 89–86
- Earned run average: 4.37
- Strikeouts: 792
- Stats at Baseball Reference

Teams
- Los Angeles Angels of Anaheim (2005–2010); Arizona Diamondbacks (2010–2012); Baltimore Orioles (2012); Seattle Mariners (2013); Texas Rangers (2014); Baltimore Orioles (2014)

Career highlights and awards
- All-Star (2008)

Joseph Francis Saunders (born June 16, 1981) is an American former professional baseball pitcher. Saunders pitched in Major League Baseball (MLB) for the Los Angeles Angels of Anaheim, Arizona Diamondbacks, Baltimore Orioles, Seattle Mariners, and Texas Rangers.

== College and minor league career ==
Saunders played college baseball at Virginia Tech, where he compiled a 27–7 career record. His 27 wins tie him for third place in most career wins in school history. His accomplishments as a Hokie earned him a place in the Virginia Tech Sports Hall of Fame. In 2001, he played collegiate summer baseball with the Harwich Mariners of the Cape Cod Baseball League and was named a league all-star.

He was drafted in the first round (12th overall) by the then Anaheim Angels in 2002. After being promoted to Single-A Cedar Rapids in 2002, he missed the entire 2003 season due to an injury in his left shoulder. He returned to the game with Single-A Rancho Cucamonga in 2004 and went 9–7 with a 3.41 ERA. He was promoted to Double-A Arkansas in 2004 and recorded a 7–4 record with two complete games in 2005. Later in 2005, he was promoted to Triple-A Salt Lake. In 2005, he was a combined 10–7 with three complete games, including two shutouts, earning honors as the Angels Organization's Pitcher of the Year. He was named #37 of the top 50 minor league baseball players in 2006 by Minor League News.

== Major league career ==
=== Los Angeles Angels ===
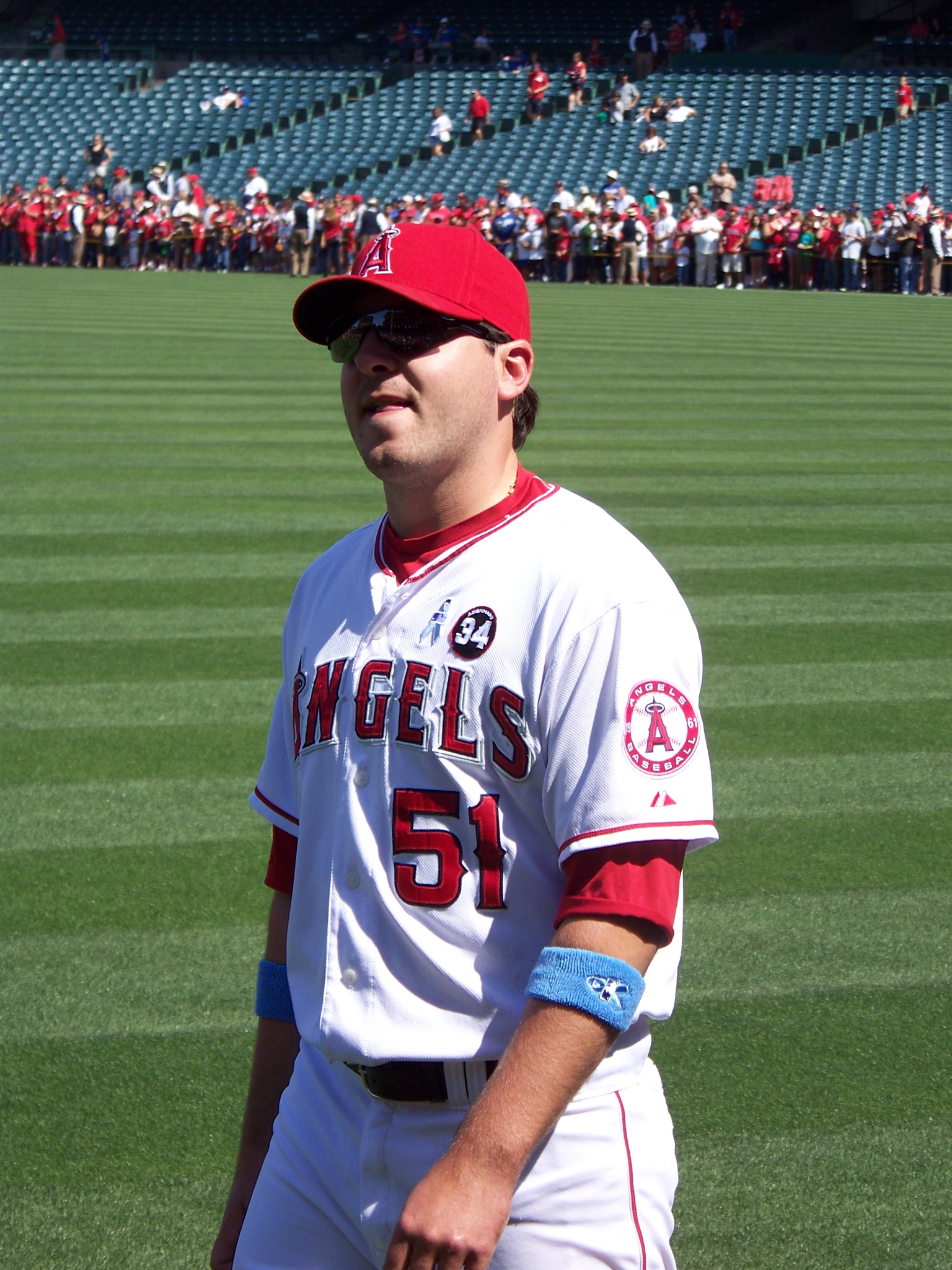
Saunders with the Angels in 2009

Saunders made his major league debut on August 16, 2005, against the Toronto Blue Jays, receiving a no decision after closer Francisco Rodríguez blew the save in a 4–3 loss for the Angels. He was sent back down to Salt Lake, but recalled on September 6 to start against the Seattle Mariners on September 14. Once again, he received a no-decision in a 10–9 defeat and was optioned to Salt Lake. Though he was not placed on the playoff roster, he was re-signed by the Angels to a one-year contract. After Bartolo Colón was placed on the disabled list during the 2006 season, Saunders was recalled a final time and replaced Colon in the rotation. Before Saunders received his first loss, he compiled a 4–0 record. He ended the season with a 7–3 record and a 4.71 ERA.

Saunders began the 2007 season in the rotation while Colon remained on the disabled list. As the only active major league player at the time from Virginia Tech, Saunders received special permission to wear a Virginia Tech cap during the April 20, 2007, game against the Seattle Mariners to honor the victims of the Virginia Tech massacre. He also wore the initials "VT" on his cleats and drew the Virginia Tech logo on the back of the pitcher's mound before the start of the game. He picked up the win after pitching six shutout innings. He was optioned to the Triple-A Salt Lake Bees on April 21, 2007, to make room for Colon's return. Saunders made two spot starts for when a pitcher on the Angel's normal rotation was injured: for Colon (triceps tendinitis) on June 2, 2007, against the Baltimore Orioles and for Jered Weaver (bruised shoulder) on June 22, 2007, against the Pittsburgh Pirates. He was called up for a third time on July 21, 2007, to replace Ervin Santana in the starting rotation when Santana was optioned to Triple-A Salt Lake.

In 2008, Saunders entered spring training in a competition with Santana for the role of 5th starter in the Angels rotation. After the Angels' co-aces John Lackey and Kelvim Escobar sustained injuries, both Saunders and Santana were promoted to full-time roles as the 3rd and 4th starter, respectively. In the first third of the season, both players shone brightly, with both being considered early candidates for the American League Cy Young Award. On June 3, 2008, Saunders became the American League's first 9-game winner in a 5–4 victory over division rivals the Seattle Mariners. Saunders gave up only one earned run, lowering his ERA to 3rd best in the American League in the process. Saunders also then became the first American League pitcher to get 11 wins, giving up only two earned runs to the Philadelphia Phillies on June 21, 2008. Following the 2008 season, Saunders was asked to join the USA Baseball team for the 2009 World Baseball Classic. However, he declined the request.

Saunders was the opening day pitcher for the Angels in the 2009 season. On May 9, 2009, he pitched his first major league complete game shutout against the Kansas City Royals. From 2008 to 2009, Saunders compiled 33 wins.

=== Arizona Diamondbacks ===
On July 25, 2010, Saunders was traded to the Arizona Diamondbacks in exchange for Dan Haren. Three minor league pitchers, left handers Patrick Corbin and Tyler Skaggs and right hander Rafael Rodríguez also went to Arizona. He made 13 starts for Arizona, posting a 3-7 record and 4.25 ERA with 50 strikeouts across 82 2/3 innings pitched.

Saunders made 33 starts for the Diamondbacks during the 2011 campaign, compiling a 12-13 record and 3.69 ERA with 108 strikeouts over 212 innings of work. On December 12, 2011, Saunders was non-tendered and became a free agent.

On January 17, 2012, Saunders re-signed with the Diamondbacks on a one-year, $6 million contract. In 21 starts for Arizona, he posted a 6-10 record and 4.22 ERA with 89 strikeouts over 130 innings of work.

=== Baltimore Orioles ===
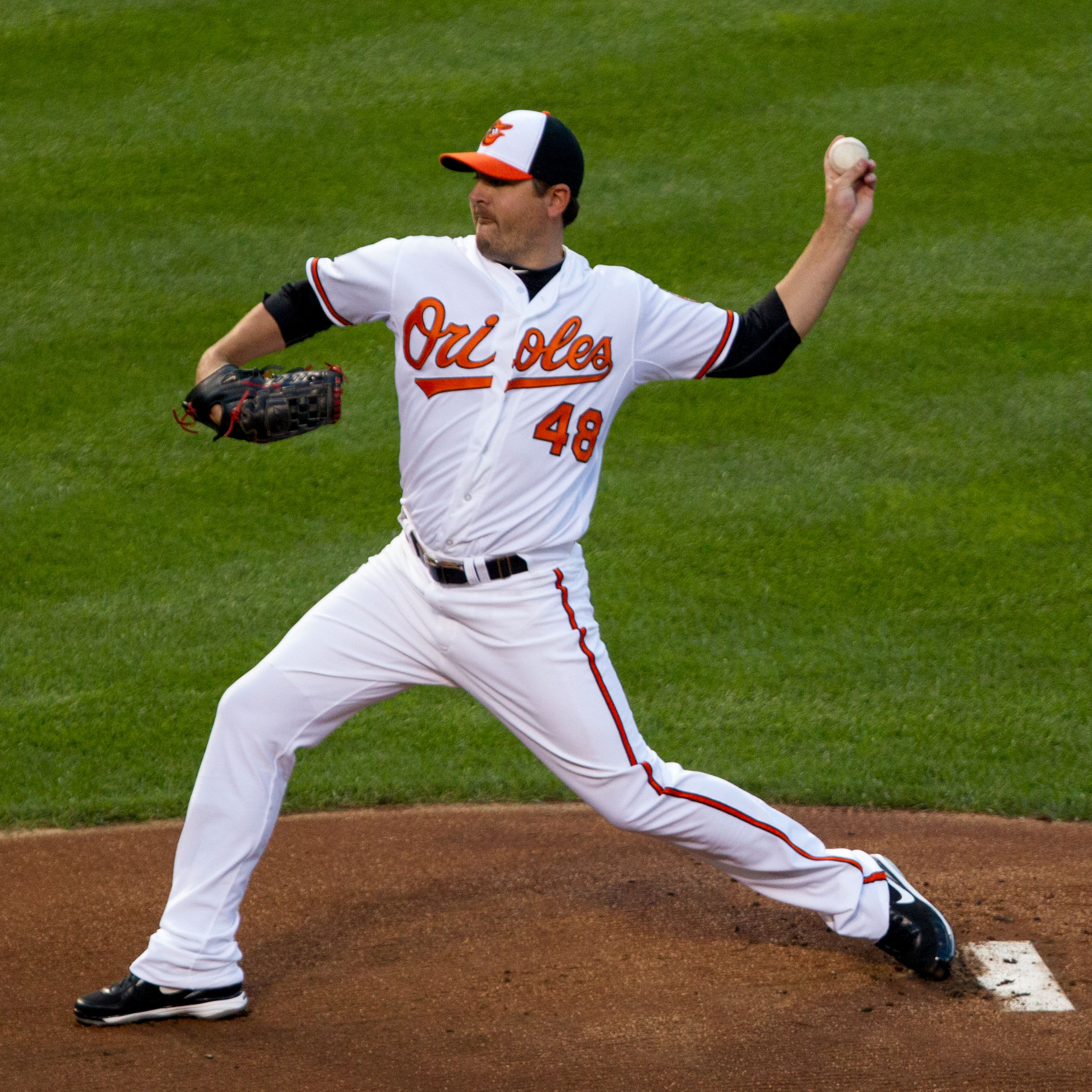
Joe Saunders in 2012.

On August 26, 2012, Saunders was traded to the Baltimore Orioles for Matt Lindstrom. He finished 3–3 in seven starts for the O's. Saunders was the winning pitcher when the Orioles defeated the Texas Rangers in the inaugural Wild Card Game, pitching 5 2/3 innings with four strikeouts. He became a free agent following the season.

=== Seattle Mariners ===
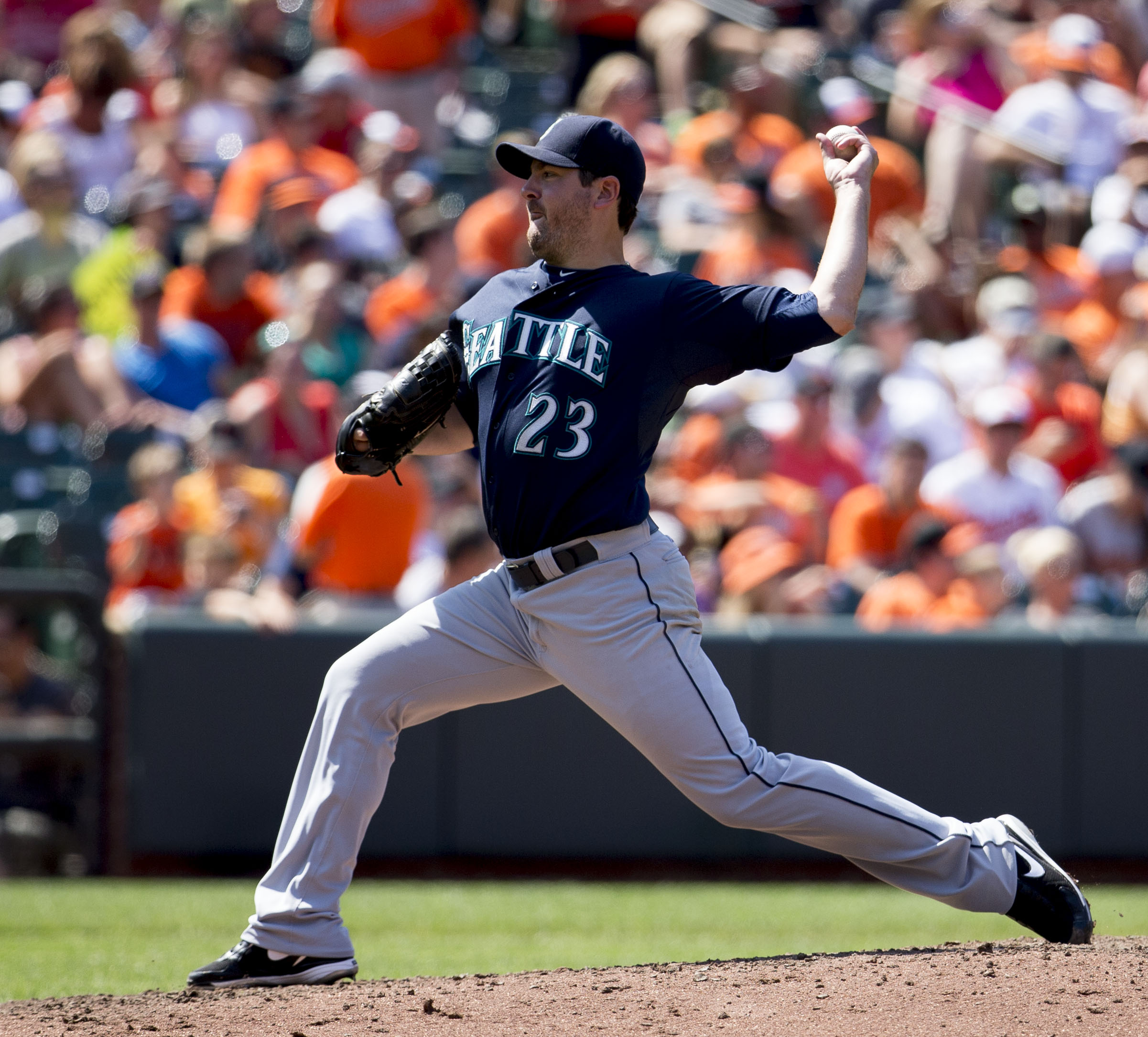
Saunders with the Mariners

On February 12, 2013, Saunders agreed to a one-year contract with the Seattle Mariners. Over his first six weeks of the season, he pitched very well at home in Safeco Field and extremely poorly in his road outings. This pattern coupled with previous good numbers at Safeco Field earned him the slightly pejorative sobriquet "Safeco Joe." Although he pitched slightly better at home than on the road, his home ERA was at 4.99 in 13 starts, while on the road his ERA was 5.45 in 19 starts. Saunders finished with a record of 11-16 and a 5.26 ERA for the M's.

=== Texas Rangers ===
On March 4, 2014, Saunders signed a one-year contract with the Texas Rangers. In eight starts for the Rangers, Saunders struggled to an 0-5 record and 6.13 ERA with 22 strikeouts across 39 2/3 innings pitched. He was designated for assignment by Texas on July 1. Saunders was released after clearing waivers on July 4.

=== Kansas City Royals ===
On July 8, 2014, Saunders signed a minor league contract with the Kansas City Royals and was assigned to the Triple-A Omaha Royals. After four starts and an ERA of 6.75 at Triple-A, he was released by the team on July 30.

=== Baltimore Orioles (second stint) ===
On August 5, 2014, Saunders returned to the Baltimore Orioles, signing a minor league contract with the club. He was called up to the big leagues on September 1 as part of the September roster expansion In six appearances for Baltimore, Saunders struggled to a 13.50 ERA with one strikeout over 3 1/3 innings. He became a free agent following the season.

=== Seattle Mariners (second stint) ===
On February 20, 2015, Saunders signed a minor league contract with the Seattle Mariners organization. In six appearances for the Triple-A Tacoma Rainiers, he logged an 0-3 record and 5.73 ERA with 12 strikeouts over 11 innings of work. Saunders opted out of his contract with the Mariners on May 1.

== Scouting report ==
Saunders has never been a strikeout pitcher, having a K/9 of less than 6. He has been durable throughout his career. Saunders relies on a fastball at around 89 to 91 MPH with sink to it, a curveball, a slider and his best pitch, a changeup.

== Personal life ==
Saunders is married to his Virginia Tech classmate and former Hokie softball player, the former Shanel Garofalo. The couple has three daughters. He described himself in an interview, "My personality is laid back and very low key. I like to have fun, and I like to hang out and be with family and friends. Then, once I get on the field, everything changes. I don’t think about any family, any friends, any babies, or anyone at all. Once I’m out there on that mound, I’m all business. I don’t think about anything except getting that hitter out any way I can."
