= Jesús Sucre =

Venezuelan baseball player (born 1988)

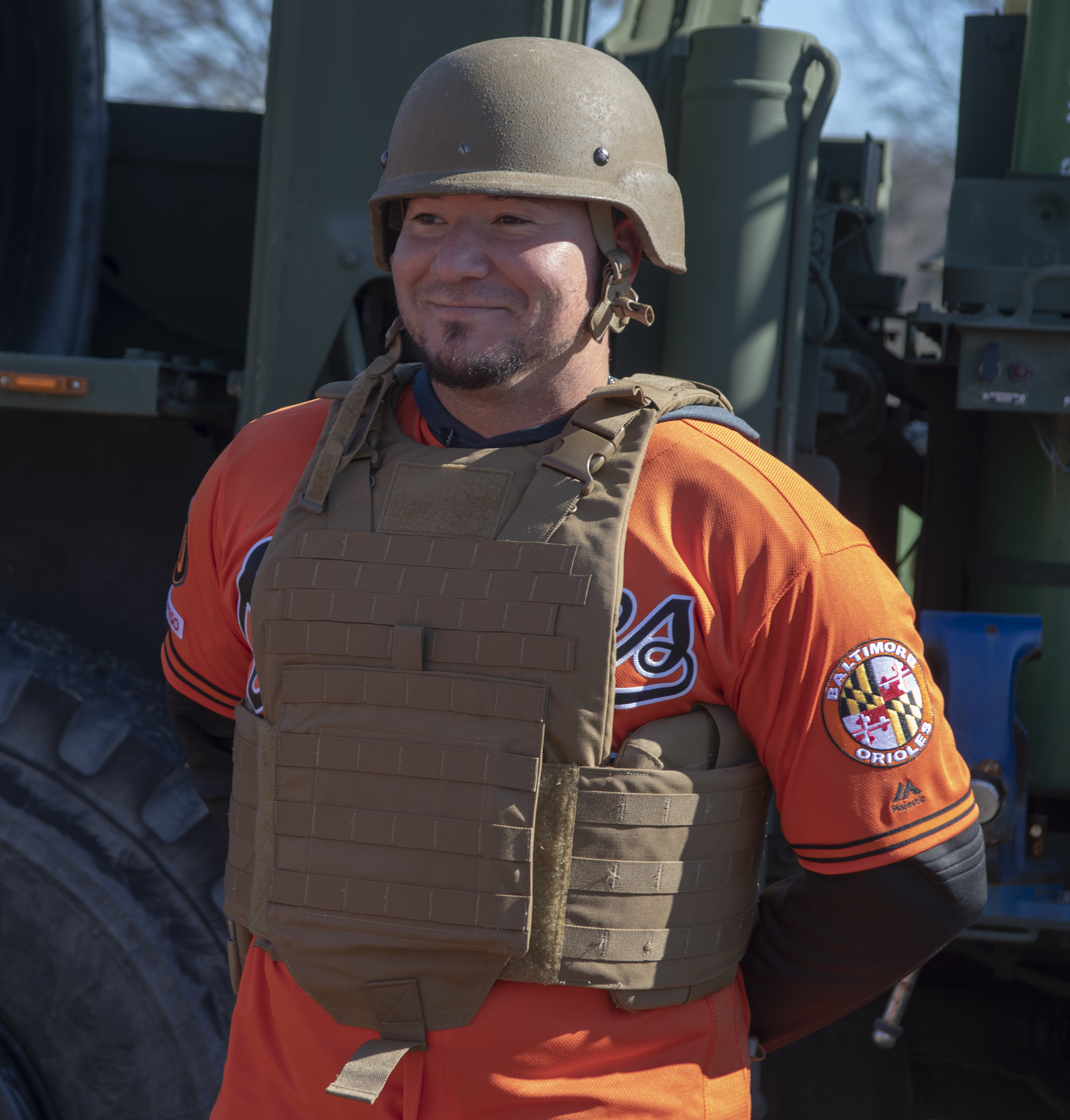
- Sucre with the Orioles at the United States Naval Academy on March 26, 2019

Delfines de La Guaira – No. 24
- Catcher
- Born: April 30, 1988 (age 37); Cumaná, Venezuela
- Batted: Right Threw: Right

MLB debut
- May 24, 2013, for the Seattle Mariners

Last MLB appearance
- April 26, 2019, for the Baltimore Orioles

MLB statistics
- Batting average: .222
- Home runs: 10
- Runs batted in: 69
- Stats at Baseball Reference

Teams
- Seattle Mariners (2013–2016); Tampa Bay Rays (2017–2018); Baltimore Orioles (2019)

Jesús Marcelo Sucre Medina (born April 30, 1988) is a Venezuelan professional baseball catcher for the Delfines de La Guaira of the Venezuelan Major League. He previously played in Major League Baseball (MLB) for the Seattle Mariners, Tampa Bay Rays, and Baltimore Orioles.

== Career ==
=== Seattle Mariners ===
Sucre was called up to the majors for the first time on May 23, 2013. He recorded his first career hit on May 24 against the Texas Rangers.

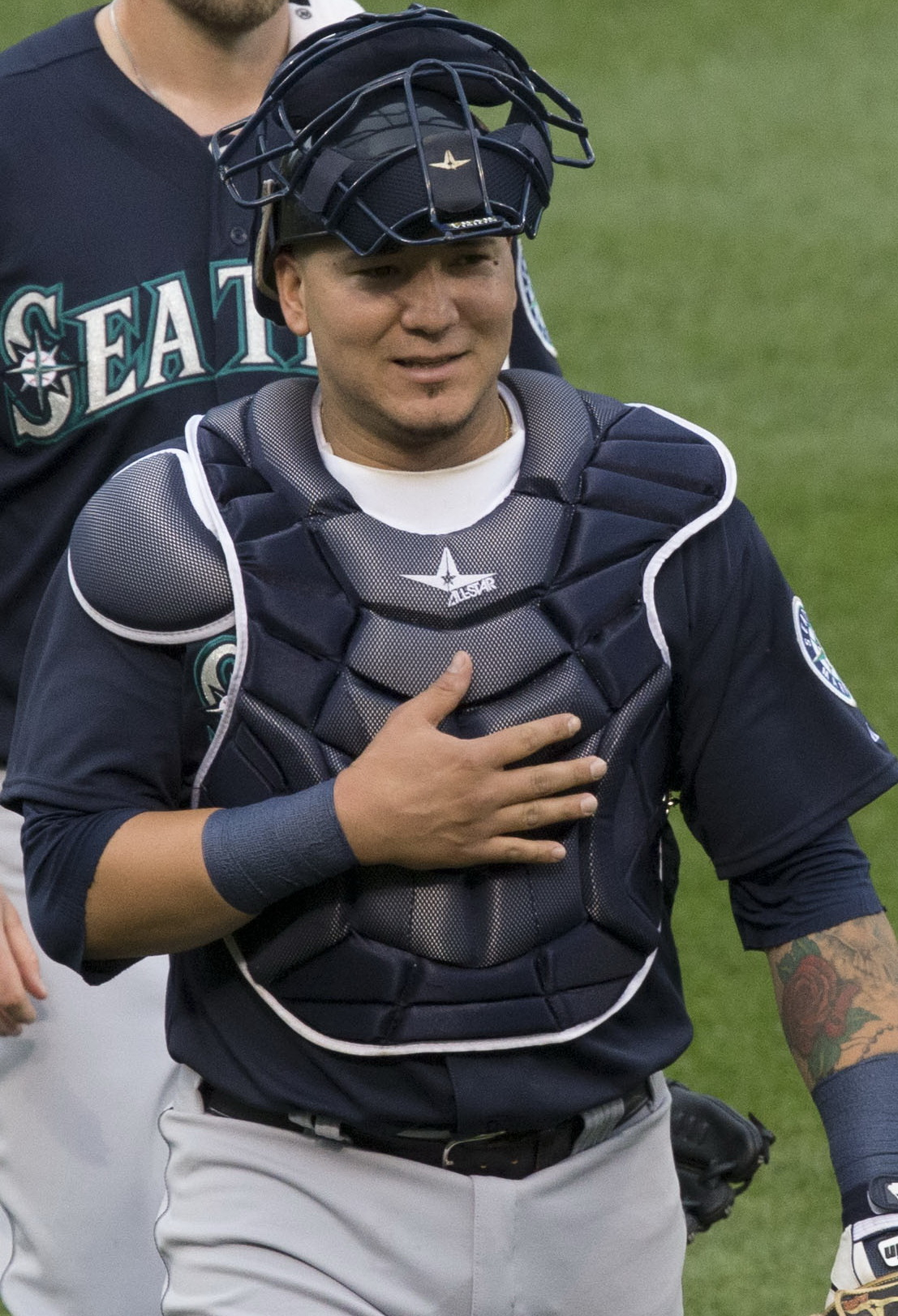
Sucre with the Mariners in 2014

Sucre was optioned to the Triple-A Tacoma Rainiers on March 11, 2014. He was called back up to the Seattle Mariners on July 8, upon the release of John Buck to serve as the backup catcher to Mike Zunino.

On June 12, 2015, the Seattle Mariners were down 10–0 against the Houston Astros when manager Lloyd McClendon called Sucre out to pitch the bottom of the 8th inning, making his MLB pitching debut. Sucre pitched a scoreless inning, delivering only 7 pitches with 4 strikes and 3 balls allowing only 1 hit, ending the inning with a 0.00 ERA. His fastest pitch was 90.8 mph. Sucre had never pitched in a baseball game before at any level, professional or amateur.

On August 12, 2015, Sucre caught Hisashi Iwakuma's no-hitter. On August 15, he was brought in to pitch the bottom of the 8th inning in a blowout against the Boston Red Sox at Fenway Park.

During the 2015–16 offseason, Sucre suffered a broken fibula and sprained ankle while playing in the Venezuelan Winter League. He had surgery in January which was expected to cause him to miss the next six months.

Sucre was activated from the 60-day disabled list on July 6, 2016. He was optioned to Tacoma on July 20, and recalled on September 2. On January 26, 2017, Sucre was designated for assignment by the Mariners. After clearing waivers, Sucre was outrighted to Triple-A Tacoma on February 1.

=== Tampa Bay Rays ===
On February 8, 2017, Sucre was traded to the Tampa Bay Rays for a player to be named later or cash. After an impressive spring training, Sucre made the team, beating out Luke Maile and Curt Casali. Sucre established career highs on offense for the season, hitting .256 with 7 home runs and 29 RBI's.

Sucre began the 2018 season as the backup to Wilson Ramos. On July 18, the Rays placed Ramos placed on the 10-day disabled list, and Sucre assumed starting responsibilities. His run as starter didn't last long as the Rays acquired Michael Perez from the Arizona Diamondbackson July 25. Sucre hit .209 in 73 games for the Rays. The Rays outrighted him to the minors on November 1. He elected free agency after the season.

=== Baltimore Orioles ===
Sucre signed a minor league contract with the Baltimore Orioles on February 1, 2019. He replaced the injured Austin Wynns when his contract was selected by the Orioles on March 25. After batting .210/.269/.242 with two doubles and three RBIs in 20 games, he was designated for assignment on April 28 and outrighted to the Triple-A Norfolk Tides two days later on April 30. He elected free agency following the 2019 season.

After the 2019 season, he played for Caribes de Anzoátegui of the Liga Venezolana de Béisbol Profesional (LVMP).

=== Gastonia Honey Hunters ===
On June 8, 2021, Sucre signed with the Gastonia Honey Hunters of the Atlantic League of Professional Baseball. In 43 games he slashed .296/.331/.408 with 1 home run and 36 RBIs. He became a free agent following the season.

=== Diablos Rojos del México ===
On May 10, 2022, Sucre signed with the Diablos Rojos del México of the Mexican League. In 11 games, he batted .206/.308/.235 with 3 RBIs. Sucre was released on May 27.

=== Mariachis de Guadalajara ===
On July 9, 2022, Sucre signed with the Mariachis de Guadalajara of the Mexican League. In 19 games he hit .258/.313/.290 with 8 RBIs. He was released on February 24, 2023.

=== Delfines de La Guaira ===
In 2025, Sucre signed with the Delfines de La Guaira of the Venezuelan Major League.

== See also ==
- List of Major League Baseball players from Venezuela
