= 2012 Seattle Mariners season =

Major League Baseball season

2012 Seattle Mariners
- League: American League
- Division: West
- Ballpark: Safeco Field
- City: Seattle, Washington
- Record: 75–87 (.463)
- Divisional place: 4th
- Owners: Nintendo of America (represented by Howard Lincoln)
- General managers: Jack Zduriencik
- Managers: Eric Wedge
- Television: Root Sports Northwest (Dave Sims, Mike Blowers, Dan Wilson, Jay Buhner, Rick Rizzs, Ken Wilson)
- Radio: ESPN-710; Seattle Mariners Radio Network (Rick Rizzs, Ron Fairly, Ken Levine, Ken Wilson, Dave Valle, Dave Henderson)

The 2012 Seattle Mariners season was the 36th season in franchise history. The Mariners played their 13th full season (14th overall) at Safeco Field and finished with a record of 75–87, fourth place in the American League West.

== Regular season ==
=== Game log ===
Legend
	Mariners win
	Mariners loss
	Postponement
**Bold**	Mariners team member

2012 Game Log: 75–87
March/April: 11-13 (Home: 3–6; Road: 8–7)

#	Date	Opponent	Score	Win	Loss	Save	Attendance	Record	Boxscore
1	March 28	@ Athletics (@ Tokyo, Japan)	3–1 (11)	**Wilhemsen** (1–0)	Carignan (0–1)	**League** (1)	44,227	1–0	
2	March 29	@ Athletics (@ Tokyo, Japan)	1–4	Colón (1–0)	**Kelley** (0–1)	Balfour (1)	43,391	1–1	
3	April 6	@ Athletics	7–3	**Vargas** (1–0)	McCarthy (0–1)	–	35,067	2–1	
4	April 7	@ Athletics	8–7	**Hernández** (1–0)	Colón (1–1)	**League** (2)	16,612	3–1	
5	April 9	@ Rangers	5–11	Darvish (1–0)	**Noesí** (0–1)		42,003	3–2	
6	April 10	@ Rangers	0–1	Feliz (1–0)	**Beavan** (0–1)	Nathan (2)	25,753	3–3	
7	April 11	@ Rangers	4–3	**Luetge** (1–0)	Nathan (0–2)	**League** (3)	32,342	4–3	
8	April 12	@ Rangers	3–5	Holland (1–0)	**Vargas** (1–1)	Adams (1)	31,513	4–4	
9	April 13	Athletics	0–4	Colón (2–1)	**Hernández** (1–1)		46,026	4–5	
10	April 14	Athletics	4–0	**Noesí** (1–1)	Milone (1–1)		21,071	5–5	
11	April 15	Athletics	5–3	**Beavan** (1–1)	Godfrey (0–2)	**League** (4)	19,650	6–5	
12	April 17	Indians	8–9	R. Pérez (1–0)	**Furbush** (0–1)	C. Perez (3)	12,461	6–6	
13	April 18	Indians	4–1	**Vargas** (2–1)	Lowe (2–1)	**League** (5)	11,343	7–6	
14	April 19	Indians	1–2	Tomlin (1–1)	**League** (0–1)	Perez (4)	12,942	7–7	
15	April 20	White Sox	3–7	Sale (2–1)	**Noesí** (1–2)		19,947	7–8	
16	April 21	White Sox	0–4	Humber (1–0)	**Beavan** (1–2)		22,472	7–9	
17	April 22	White Sox	4–7	Danks (2–2)	**Millwood** (0–1)	Santiago (4)	19,975	7–10	
18	April 24	@ Tigers	7–4	**Vargas** (3–1)	Scherzer (1–2)	**League** (6)	30,073	8–10	
19	April 25	@ Tigers	9–1	**Hernández** (2–1)	Wilk (0–3)		28,527	9–10	
20	April 26	@ Tigers	5–4	**Furbush** (1–1)	Porcello (1–2)	**League** (7)	31,451	10–10	
21	April 27	@ Blue Jays	9–5 (10)	**Furbush** (2–1)	Pérez (2–1)		24,303	11–10	
22	April 28	@ Blue Jays	0–7	Morrow (2–1)	**Millwood** (0–2)		30,765	11–11	
23	April 29	@ Blue Jays	2–7	Álvarez (1–2)	**Vargas** (3–2)		22,320	11–12	
24	April 30	@ Rays	2–3 (12)	Howell (1–0)	**League** (0–2)		9,458	11–13	

May: 12–17 (Home: 6–7; Road: 6–10)

#	Date	Opponent	Score	Win	Loss	Save	Attendance	Record	Boxscore
25	May 1	@ Rays	1–3	Moore (1–1)	**Noesí** (1–3)	Rodney (8)	9,972	11–14	
26	May 2	@ Rays	4–5	Shields (5–0)	**Beavan** (1–3)	Peralta (1)	9,837	11–15	
27	May 3	@ Rays	3–4	Niemann (2–3)	**Millwood** (0–3)	Rodney (9)	11,575	11–16	
28	May 4	Twins	2–3	Pavano (2–2)	**Wilhemsen** (1–1)	Capps (5)	22,492	11–17	
29	May 5	Twins	7–0	**Hernández** (3–1)	Marquis (2–1)		28,437	12–17	
30	May 6	Twins	5–2	**Noesí** (2–3)	Blackburn (0–4)		23,913	13–17	
31	May 7	Tigers	3–2	**Delabar** (1–0)	Dotel (1–1)		14,462	14–17	
32	May 8	Tigers	4–6	Verlander (3–1)	**Millwood** (0–4)	Valverde (6)	13,455	14–18	
33	May 9	Tigers	2–1	**Vargas** (4–2)	Putkonen (0–1)	**League** (8)	15,655	15–18	
34	May 11	@ Yankees	2–6	Kuroda (3–4)	**Hernández** (3–2)		37,226	15–19	
35	May 12	@ Yankees	2–6	Hughes (3–4)	**Noesí** (2–4)	Logan (1)	43,954	15–20	
36	May 13	@ Yankees	6–2	**Millwood** (1–4)	Pettitte (0–1)		41,631	16–20	
37	May 14	@ Red Sox	1–6	Lester (2–3)	**Vargas** (4–3)		37,334	16–21	
38	May 15	@ Red Sox	0–5	Beckett (3–4)	**Beavan** (1–4)		37,292	16–22	
39	May 16	@ Indians	3–9	Jiménez (4–3)	**Hernández** (3–3)		12,092	16–23	
40	May 17	@ Indians	5–6 (11)	Smith (4–1)	**League** (0–3)		12,894	16–24	
41	May 18	@ Rockies	4–0	**Millwood** (2–4)	White (0–3)		34,887	17–24	
42	May 19	@ Rockies	10–3	**Vargas** (5–3)	Friedrich (1–1)		30,784	18–24	
43	May 20	@ Rockies	6–4	**Beavan** (2–4)	Guthrie (2–2)		36,662	19–24	
44	May 21	Rangers	6–1	**Hernández** (4–3)	Darvish (6–2)		18,672	20–24	
45	May 22	Rangers	1–3	Harrison (5–3)	**Noesí** (2–5)	Nathan (10)	15,604	20–25	
46	May 23	Rangers	5–3	**Millwood** (3–4)	Feldman (0–2)	**League** (9)	23,097	21–25	
47	May 24	Angels	0–3	Haren (2–5)	**Vargas** (5–4)		18,048	21–26	
48	May 25	Angels	4–6	Isringhausen (1–0)	**League** (0–4)	Downs (4)	23,517	21–27	
49	May 26	Angels	3–5	Williams (5–2)	**Hernández** (4–4)	Frieri (2)	29,483	21–28	
50	May 27	Angels	2–4	Wilson (6–4)	**Noesí** (2–6)	Downs (5)	24,467	21–29	
51	May 28	@ Rangers	2–4	Harrison (6–3)	**Delabar** (1–1)	Nathan (11)	41,384	21–30	
52	May 29	@ Rangers	10–3	**Vargas** (6–4)	Feldman (0–3)		34,531	22–30	
53	May 30	@ Rangers	21–8	**Beavan** (3–4)	Holland (4–4)	**Iwakuma** (1)	43,580	23–30	

June: 11–16 (Home: 6–9; Road: 5–7)

#	Date	Opponent	Score	Win	Loss	Save	Attendance	Record	Boxscore
54	June 1	@ White Sox	4–7	Crain (1–0)	**Kelley** (0–2)	Reed (7)	19,168	23–31	
55	June 2	@ White Sox	10–8 (12)	**Wilhelmsen** (2–1)	Reed (0–1)	**Iwakuma** (2)	26,200	24–31	
56	June 3	@ White Sox	2–4	Sale (7–2)	**Millwood** (3–5)		23,062	24–32	
57	June 4	@ Angels	8–6	**Vargas** (7–4)	Santana (2–7)	**Wilhelmsen** (1)	36,079	25–32	
58	June 5	@ Angels	1–6	Richards (1–0)	**Beavan** (3–5)		35,021	25–33	
59	June 6	@ Angels	8–6	**Kelley** (1–2)	Williams (6–3)	**Wilhelmsen** (2)	37,342	26–33	
60	June 8	Dodgers	1–0	**Pryor** (1–0)	Elbert (0–1)	**Wilhelmsen** (3)	22,028	27–33	
61	June 9	Dodgers	3–8	Kershaw (5–3)	**Vargas** (7–5)		30,287	27–34	
62	June 10	Dodgers	2–8	Billingsley (4–4)	**Beavan** (3–6)		34,807	27–35	
63	June 12	Padres	4–5	Richard (3–7)	**Hernández** (4–5)	Street (6)	13,084	27–36	
64	June 13	Padres	0–1	Marquis (3–5)	**Noesí** (2–7)	Street (7)	13,931	27–37	
65	June 14	Padres	2–6	Vólquez (3–6)	**Ramírez** (0–1)		17,306	27–38	
66	June 15	Giants	2–4	Vogelsong (6–2)	**Vargas** (7–6)	Casilla (18)	29,818	27–39	
67	June 16	Giants	7–4	**Iwakuma** (1–0)	Lincecum (2–8)	**Wilhelmsen** (4)	30,589	28–39	
68	June 17	Giants	2–1	**Wilhelmsen** (3–1)	Romo (2–1)		40,603	29–39	
69	June 18	@ Diamondbacks	1–7	Miley (8–3)	**Noesí** (2–8)		24,284	29–40	
70	June 19	@ Diamondbacks	12–9 (10)	**Furbush** (3–1)	Putz (1–4)	**Wilhelmsen** (5)	21,568	30–40	
71	June 20	@ Diamondbacks	10–14	Cahill (6–5)	**Vargas** (7–7)		29,630	30–41	
72	June 22	@ Padres	5–9	Richard (5–7)	**Millwood** (3–6)	Street (9)	30,053	30–42	
73	June 23	@ Padres	5–1	**Hernández** (5–5)	Marquis (3–7)		30,922	31–42	
74	June 24	@ Padres	0–2	Vólquez (4–7)	**Noesí** (2–9)	Street (10)	27,529	31–43	
75	June 25	Athletics	0–1	Milone (8–5)	**Ramírez** (0–2)	Cook (5)	17,101	31–44	
76	June 26	Athletics	3–2	**Furbush** (4–1)	Miller (2–1)	**Wilhelmsen** (6)	12,411	32–44	
77	June 27	Athletics	1–2	Parker (4–3)	**Iwakuma** (1–1)	Cook (6)	18,158	32–45	
78	June 28	Red Sox	1–0	**Hernández** (6–5)	Atchison (2–1)		20,692	33–45	
79	June 29	Red Sox	0–5	Cook (2–1)	**Noesí** (2–10)		23,094	33–46	
80	June 30	Red Sox	3–2 (11)	**Kelley** (2–2)	Aceves (0–5)		31,311	34–46	

July: 15–11 (Home: 9–7; Road: 6–4)

#	Date	Opponent	Score	Win	Loss	Save	Attendance	Record	Boxscore
81	July 1	Red Sox	1–2 (10)	Padilla (2–0)	**League** (0–5)	Aceves (19)	34,065	34–47	
82	July 2	Orioles	6–3	**Delabar** (2–1)	Hammel (8–4)	**Wilhelmsen** (7)	14,805	35–47	
83	July 3	Orioles	4–5	O'Day (5–0)	**Furbush** (4–2)	Johnson (24)	16,270	35–48	
84	July 4	Orioles	2–4	Tillman (1–0)	**Noesí** (2–11)	Johnson (25)	21,982	35–49	
85	July 6	@ Athletics	1–4 (11)	Norberto (1–1)	**Pérez** (0–1)		10,819	35–50	
86	July 7	@ Athletics	7–1	**Vargas** (8–7)	Parker (5–4)		16,136	36–50	
87	July 8	@ Athletics	1–2 (13)	Norberto (2–1)	**Pérez** (0–2)		20,075	36–51	
88	July 13	Rangers	2–3	Holland (6–4)	**Millwood** (3–7)	Nathan (19)	23,721	36–52	
89	July 14	Rangers	7–0	**Hernández** (7–5)	Darvish (10–6)		29,951	37–52	
90	July 15	Rangers	0–4	Harrison (12–4)	**Iwakuma** (1–2)		27,378	37–53	
91	July 16	@ Royals	9–4	**Vargas** (9–7)	Sánchez (1–6)		16,697	38–53	
92	July 17	@ Royals	9–6	**Beavan** (4–6)	Verdugo (0–1)	**Wilhelmsen** (8)	15,769	39–53	
93	July 18	@ Royals	7–8	Holland (4–2)	**Kinney** (0–1)		17,312	39–54	
94	July 19	@ Royals	6–1	**Hernández** (8–5)	Smith (1–3)		16,706	40–54	
95	July 20	@ Rays	3–4 (14)	McGee (3–2)	**Wilhelmsen** (3–2)		14,143	40–55	
96	July 21	@ Rays	2–1	**Vargas** (10–7)	Cobb (4–7)	**Wilhelmsen** (9)	18,800	41–55	
97	July 22	@ Rays	2–1	**Beavan** (5–6)	Moore (6–7)	**Wilhelmsen** (10)	20,908	42–55	
98	July 23	Yankees	1–4	Kuroda (10–7)	**Millwood** (3–8)	Soriano (25)	29,911	42–56	
99	July 24	Yankees	4–2	**Hernández** (9–5)	García (4–4)	**Wilhelmsen** (11)	31,908	43–56	
100	July 25	Yankees	2–5	Phelps (2–3)	**Luetge** (1–1)	Soriano (26)	36,071	43–57	
101	July 26	Royals	4–1	**Vargas** (11–7)	Mendoza (4–7)	**Wilhelmsen** (12)	15,014	44–57	
102	July 27	Royals	6–1	**Beavan** (6–6)	Guthrie (3–11)		14,953	45–57	
103	July 28	Royals	4–3	**Millwood** (4–8)	Chen (7–9)	**Wilhelmsen** (13)	32,111	46–57	
104	July 29	Royals	7–6	**Pérez** (1–2)	Mijares (2–2)	**Wilhelmsen** (14)	19,402	47–57	
105	July 30	Blue Jays	4–1	**Iwakuma** (2–2)	Romero (8–8)	**Luetge** (1)	22,443	48–57	
106	July 31	Blue Jays	7–2	**Vargas** (12–7)	Laffey (2–2)		21,434	49–57	

August: 15–12 (Home: 9–2; Road: 6–10)

#	Date	Opponent	Score	Win	Loss	Save	Attendance	Record	Boxscore
107	August 1	Blue Jays	5–3	**Beavan** (7–6)	Villanueva (6–1)	**Wilhelmsen** (15)	22,537	50–57	
108	August 3	@ Yankees	3–6	Sabathia (11–3)	**Millwood** (4–9)		45,872	50–58	
109	August 4	@ Yankees	1–0	**Hernández** (10–5)	Kuroda (10–8)		47,067	51–58	
110	August 5	@ Yankees	2–6	García (5–5)	**Iwakuma** (2–3)		45,878	51–59	
111	August 6	@ Orioles	1–3	Tillman (5–1)	**Vargas** (12–8)	Johnson (33)	21,184	51–60	
112	August 7	@ Orioles	7–8 (14)	O'Day (6–0)	**Kelley** (2–3)		15,433	51–61	
113	August 8	@ Orioles	2–9	Johnson (1–0)	**Millwood** (4–10)		17,312	51–62	
114	August 10	@ Angels	5–6	Frieri (2–0)	**Kinney** (0–2)		39,016	51–63	
115	August 11	@ Angels	7–4	**Iwakuma** (3–3)	Haren (8–9)		38,722	52–63	
116	August 12	@ Angels	4–1	**Vargas** (13–8)	Weaver (15–2)	**Wilhelmsen** (16)	36,505	53–63	
117	August 13	Rays	1–4	Cobb (7–8)	**Beavan** (7–7)	Rodney (37)	16,205	53–64	
118	August 14	Rays	3–2	**Pryor** (2–0)	Rodney (2–2)		17,065	54–64	
119	August 15	Rays	1–0	**Hernández** (11–5)	Hellickson (7–8)		21,889	55–64	
120	August 17	Twins	5–3	**Iwakuma** (4–3)	Blackburn (4–9)	**Wilhelmsen** (17)	22,602	56–64	
121	August 18	Twins	3–2	**Wilhelmsen** (4–2)	Robertson (1–1)		21,154	57–64	
122	August 19	Twins	5–1	**Beavan** (8–7)	Deduno (4–1)	**Kinney** (1)	22,635	58–64	
123	August 20	Indians	5–3	**Furbush** (5–2)	Smith (7–4)	**Wilhelmsen** (18)	14,687	59–64	
124	August 21	Indians	5–1	**Hernández** (12–5)	Hernández (0–2)	**Luetge** (2)	39,204	60–64	
125	August 22	Indians	3–1	**Pryor** (3–0)	Pestano (3–1)	**Wilhelmsen** (19)	18,578	61–64	
126	August 24	@ White Sox	8–9	Reed (3–1)	**Wilhelmsen** (4–3)		25,058	61–65	
127	August 25	@ White Sox	4–5	Jones (6–0)	**Beavan** (8–8)	Reed (24)	27,562	61–66	
128	August 26	@ White Sox	3–4 (7)	Jones (7–0)	**Millwood** (4–11)		23,146	61–67	
129	August 27	@ Twins	1–0	**Hernández** (13–5)	Hendriks (0–7)		31,883	62–67	
130	August 28	@ Twins	5–2	**Iwakuma** (5–3)	Diamond (10–6)	**Wilhelmsen** (20)	29,854	63–67	
131	August 29	@ Twins	0–10	Deduno (5–2)	**Vargas** (13–9)		29,281	63–68	
132	August 30	@ Twins	5–4	**Beavan** (9–8)	Duensing (3–10)	**Wilhelmsen** (21)	32,578	64–68	
133	August 31	Angels	1–9	Haren (9–10)	**Millwood** (4–12)		17,739	64–69	

September/October: 11–18 (Home: 7–9; Road: 4–9)

#	Date	Opponent	Score	Win	Loss	Save	Attendance	Record	Boxscore
134	September 1	Angels	2–5	Santana (8–11)	**Hernández** (13–6)	Frieri (17)	22,910	64–70	
135	September 2	Angels	2–1	**Iwakuma** (6–3)	Weaver (16–4)	**Wilhelmsen** (22)	20,584	65–70	
136	September 3	Red Sox	4–1	**Vargas** (14–9)	Buchholz (11–5)	**Wilhelmsen** (23)	21,641	66–70	
137	September 4	Red Sox	3–4	Lester (9–11)	**Beavan** (9–9)	Bailey (2)	12,754	66–71	
138	September 5	Red Sox	2–1	**Millwood** (5–12)	Cook (3–9)	**Wilhelmsen** (24)	13,037	67–71	
139	September 7	Athletics	1–6	Griffin (5–0)	**Hernández** (13–7)		17,128	67–72	
140	September 8	Athletics	1–6	Anderson (4–0)	**Iwakuma** (6–4)		23,177	67–73	
141	September 9	Athletics	2–4	Milone (12–10)	**Vargas** (14–10)	Balfour (16)	14,403	67–74	
142	September 11	@ Blue Jays	4–3	**Ramírez** (1–2)	Morrow (8–6)	**Wilhelmsen** (25)	12,935	68–74	
143	September 12	@ Blue Jays	3–2	**Millwood** (6–12)	Romero (8–14)	**Wilhelmsen** (26)	13,519	69–74	
144	September 13	@ Blue Jays	3–8	Álvarez (9–12)	**Hernández** (13–8)		13,756	69–75	
145	September 14	@ Rangers	3–9	Darvish (15–9)	**Iwakuma** (6–5)		45,075	69–76	
146	September 15	@ Rangers	8–6	**Luetge** (2–1)	Scheppers (1–1)	**Wilhelmsen** (27)	47,267	70–76	
147	September 16	@ Rangers	1–2	Harrison (17–9)	**Beavan** (9–10)	Uehara (1)	45,928	70–77	
148	September 17	Orioles	4–10	Tillman (8–2)	**Noesí** (2–12)		13,036	70–78	
149	September 18	Orioles	2–4 (18)	Hunter (5–8)	**Luetge** (2–2)	Johnson (44)	12,608	70–79	
150	September 19	Orioles	1–3 (11)	Ayala (5–4)	**Kinney** (0–3)	Johnson (45)	14,001	70–80	
151	September 21	Rangers	6–3	**Iwakuma** (7–5)	Pérez (1–2)	**Wilhelmsen** (28)	17,893	71–80	
152	September 22	Rangers	1–0	**Beavan** (10–10)	Harrison (17–10)	**Wilhelmsen** (29)	17,671	72–80	
153	September 23	Rangers	2–3	Dempster (12–7)	**Vargas** (14–11)	Nathan (35)	19,024	72–81	
154	September 25	@ Angels	4–5	Greinke (15–5)	**Ramírez** (1–3)	Frieri (21)	38,538	72–82	
155	September 26	@ Angels	3–4	Frieri (5–2)	**Pryor** (3–1)		37,916	72–83	
156	September 27	@ Angels	9–4	**Iwakuma** (8–5)	Haren (12–12)		37,377	73–83	
157	September 28	@ Athletics	2–8	Griffin (7–1)	**Beavan** (10–11)		16,376	73–84	
158	September 29	@ Athletics	4–7 (10)	Balfour (3–2)	**Pérez** (1–3)		21,517	73–85	
159	September 30	@ Athletics	2–5	Doolittle (2–1)	**Kelley** (2–4)	Balfour (22)	21,057	73–86	
160	October 1	Angels	4–8	Wilson (13–10)	**Hernández** (13–9)		13,963	73–87	
161	October 2	Angels	6–1	**Iwakuma** (9–5)	Haren (12–13)		14,353	74–87	
162	October 3	Angels	12–0	**Beavan** (11–11)	Weaver (20–5)		15,614	75–87	

=== Standings ===
==== American League West ====
AL West
Team	W	L	Pct.	GB	Home	Road
Oakland Athletics	94	68	.580	—	50‍–‍31	44‍–‍37
Texas Rangers	93	69	.574	1	50‍–‍31	43‍–‍38
Los Angeles Angels of Anaheim	89	73	.549	5	46‍–‍35	43‍–‍38
Seattle Mariners	75	87	.463	19	40‍–‍41	35‍–‍46

==== American League Wild Card ====
Division winners
Team	W	L	Pct.
New York Yankees	95	67	.586
Oakland Athletics	94	68	.580
Detroit Tigers	88	74	.543

Wild Card teams (Top 2 teams qualify for postseason)
Team	W	L	Pct.	GB
Texas Rangers	93	69	.574	—
Baltimore Orioles	93	69	.574	—
Tampa Bay Rays	90	72	.556	3
Los Angeles Angels of Anaheim	89	73	.549	4
Chicago White Sox	85	77	.525	8
Seattle Mariners	75	87	.463	18
Toronto Blue Jays	73	89	.451	20
Kansas City Royals	72	90	.444	21
Boston Red Sox	69	93	.426	24
Cleveland Indians	68	94	.420	25
Minnesota Twins	66	96	.407	27

==== Record against opponents ====
2012 American League record Source: MLB Standings Grid – 2012
Team	BAL	BOS	CWS	CLE	DET	KC	LAA	MIN	NYY	OAK	SEA	TB	TEX	TOR	NL
Baltimore	–	13–5	6–2	4–4	3–3	5–4	2–7	5–2	9–9	4–5	8–1	10–8	2–5	11–7	11–7
Boston	5–13	–	6–2	5–3	5–5	4–3	0–6	4–3	5–13	1–8	5–4	9–9	2–6	7–11	11–7
Chicago	2–6	2–6	–	11–7	6–12	6–12	3–5	14–4	5–2	3–3	8–1	4–3	6–3	6–4	9–9
Cleveland	4–4	3–5	7–11	–	10–8	8–10	5–4	6–12	1–5	2–8	4–4	4–4	4–5	2–4	8–10
Detroit	3–3	5–5	12–6	8–10	–	13–5	5–5	10–8	4–6	4–3	1–5	5–2	3–7	4–2	11–7
Kansas City	4–5	3–4	12–6	10–8	5–13	–	4–5	7–11	3–4	5–4	1–7	4–2	4–5	2–6	8–10
Los Angeles	7–2	6–0	5–3	4–5	5–5	5–4	–	6–3	4–5	9–10	11–8	1–9	10–9	4–4	12–6
Minnesota	2–5	3–4	4–14	12–6	8–10	11–7	3–6	–	3–4	4–5	2–8	1–5	2–8	2–5	9–9
New York	9–9	13–5	2–5	5–1	6–4	4–3	5–4	4–3	–	5–5	6–3	8–10	4–3	11–7	13–5
Oakland	5–4	8–1	3–3	8–2	3–4	4–5	10–9	5–4	5–5	–	12–7	5–4	11–8	5–4	10–8
Seattle	1–8	4–5	1–8	4–4	5–1	7–1	8–11	8–2	3–6	7–12	–	4–6	9–10	6–3	8–10
Tampa Bay	8–10	9–9	3–4	4–4	2–5	2–4	9–1	5–1	10–8	4–5	6–4	–	5–4	14–4	9–9
Texas	5–2	6–2	3–6	5–4	7–3	5–4	9–10	8–2	3–4	8–11	10–9	4–5	–	6–3	14–4
Toronto	7–11	11–7	4–6	4–2	2–4	6–2	4–4	5–2	7–11	4–5	3–6	4–14	3–6	–	9–9

- Source: MLB Standings Grid – 2012

=== Roster ===
2012 Seattle Mariners
**Roster**
**Pitchers**: 49 Blake Beavan; 58 Carter Capps; 35 Steve Delabar; 41 Charlie Furbush; 34 Félix Hernández; 18 Hisashi Iwakuma; 23 Shawn Kelley; 53 Josh Kinney; 43 Brandon League; 44 Lucas Luetge; 25 Kevin Millwood; 45 Héctor Noesí; 36 Óliver Pérez; 46 Stephen Pryor; 50 Erasmo Ramírez; 52 George Sherrill; 38 Jason Vargas; 54 Tom Wilhelmsen	**Catchers**: 27 John Jaso; 63 Jesús Montero; 30 Miguel Olivo; **Infielders**: 13 Dustin Ackley; 20 Mike Carp; 61 Munenori Kawasaki; 16 Alex Liddi; 26 Brendan Ryan; 15 Kyle Seager; 17 Justin Smoak; 8 Carlos Triunfel	**Outfielders**: 9 Chone Figgins; 21 Franklin Gutiérrez; 4 Carlos Peguero; 12 Trayvon Robinson; 55 Michael Saunders; 51 Ichiro Suzuki; 10 Eric Thames; 33 Casper Wells; **Other batters**: 39 Luis Jiménez	**Manager**: 22 Eric Wedge; **Coaches**: 29 Mike Brumley (first base); 40 Chris Chambliss (hitting); 28 Jeff Datz (third base); 47 Jaime Navarro (bullpen); 62 Jason Phillips (bullpen catcher); 6 Robby Thompson (bench); 48 Carl Willis (pitching)

=== Players stats ===
==== Batting ====
Note: G = Games played; AB = At bats; R = Runs scored; H = Hits; 2B = Doubles; 3B = Triples; HR = Home runs; RBI = Runs batted in; SB = Stolen bases; BB = Base on balls; AVG = Batting average; SLG = Slugging average

Player	G	AB	R	H	2B	3B	HR	RBI	SB	BB	AVG	SLG
Dustin Ackley	153	607	84	137	22	2	12	50	13	59	.226	.328
Kyle Seager	155	594	62	154	35	1	20	86	13	46	.259	.423
Jesús Montero	135	515	46	134	20	0	15	62	0	29	.260	.386
Michael Saunders	139	507	71	125	31	3	19	57	21	43	.247	.432
Justin Smoak	132	483	49	105	14	0	19	51	1	49	.217	.364
Brendan Ryan	141	407	42	79	19	3	3	31	11	44	.194	.278
Ichiro Suzuki	95	402	49	105	15	5	4	28	15	17	.261	.353
Miguel Olivo	87	315	27	70	14	0	12	29	3	7	.222	.381
John Jaso	108	294	41	81	19	2	10	50	5	56	.276	.456
Casper Wells	93	285	42	65	12	3	10	36	3	26	.228	.396
Chone Figgins	66	166	18	30	5	2	2	11	4	19	.181	.271
Mike Carp	59	164	17	35	6	0	5	20	1	21	.213	.341
Franklin Gutiérrez	40	150	18	39	10	1	4	17	3	9	.260	.420
Trayvon Robinson	46	145	16	32	4	1	3	12	6	14	.221	.324
Eric Thames	40	123	10	27	5	2	6	14	1	6	.220	.439
Alex Liddi	38	116	8	26	4	1	3	10	2	9	.224	.353
Munenori Kawasaki	61	104	13	20	1	0	0	7	2	8	.192	.202
Carlos Peguero	17	56	2	10	2	1	2	7	0	1	.179	.357
Carlos Triunfel	10	22	2	5	2	0	0	3	0	1	.227	.318
Luis Jiménez	7	17	0	1	0	0	0	0	0	1	.059	.059
Pitcher totals	162	22	2	5	1	0	0	3	0	1	.227	.273
**Team totals**	**162**	**5494**	**619**	**1285**	**241**	**27**	**149**	**584**	**104**	**466**	**.234**	**.369**

==== Pitching ====
Note: W = Wins; L = Losses; ERA = Earned run average; G = Games pitched; GS = Games started; SV = Saves; IP = Innings pitched; H = Hits allowed; R = Runs allowed; ER = Earned runs allowed; BB = Walks allowed; SO = Strikeouts

Player	W	L	ERA	G	GS	SV	IP	H	R	ER	BB	SO
Félix Hernández	13	9	3.06	33	33	0	232.0	209	84	79	56	223
Jason Vargas	14	11	3.85	33	33	0	217.1	201	94	93	55	141
Kevin Millwood	6	12	4.25	28	28	0	161.0	168	86	76	56	107
Blake Beavan	11	11	4.43	26	26	0	152.1	168	76	75	24	67
Hisashi Iwakuma	9	5	3.16	30	16	2	125.1	117	49	44	43	101
Héctor Noesí	2	12	5.82	22	18	0	106.2	107	71	69	39	68
Tom Wilhelmsen	4	3	2.50	73	0	29	79.1	59	24	22	29	87
Erasmo Ramírez	1	3	3.36	16	8	0	59.0	47	26	22	29	37
Charlie Furbush	5	2	2.72	48	0	0	46.1	28	15	14	16	53
Brandon League	0	5	3.63	46	0	9	44.2	48	20	18	19	27
Shawn Kelley	2	4	3.25	47	0	0	44.1	43	20	16	15	45
Lucas Luetge	2	2	3.98	63	0	2	40.2	37	20	18	24	38
Steve Delabar	2	1	4.17	34	0	0	36.2	23	17	17	11	46
Josh Kinney	0	3	3.94	35	0	1	32.0	24	14	14	15	36
Óliver Pérez	1	3	2.12	33	0	0	29.2	27	7	7	10	24
Carter Capps	0	0	3.96	18	0	0	25.0	25	11	11	11	28
Stephen Pryor	3	1	3.91	26	0	0	23.0	22	13	10	13	27
George Sherrill	0	0	27.00	2	0	0	1.1	6	4	4	1	0
**Team totals**	**75**	**87**	**3.76**	**162**	**162**	**43**	**1456.2**	**1359**	**651**	**608**	**449**	**1166**

== Farm system ==
Level	Team	League	Manager
AAA	Tacoma Rainiers	Pacific Coast League	Daren Brown
AA	Jackson Generals	Southern League	Jim Pankovits
A	High Desert Mavericks	California League	Pedro Grifol
A	Clinton LumberKings	Midwest League	Eddie Menchaca
A-Short Season	Everett AquaSox	Northwest League	Rob Mummau
Rookie	Pulaski Mariners	Appalachian League	José Moreno
Rookie	AZL Mariners	Arizona League	Mike Kinkade
