= 2012 Tampa Bay Rays season =

2012 Tampa Bay Rays
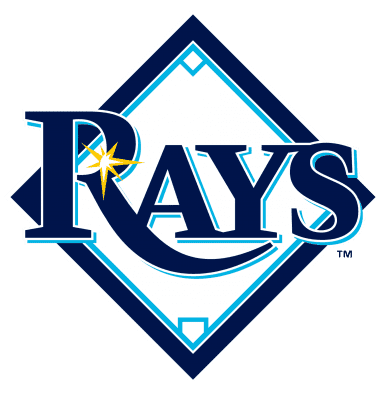
- League: American League
- Division: East
- Ballpark: Tropicana Field
- City: St. Petersburg, Florida
- Record: 90–72 (.556)
- Divisional place: 3rd
- Owners: Stuart Sternberg
- General managers: Andrew Friedman (de facto)
- Managers: Joe Maddon
- Television: Sun Sports (Dewayne Staats, Brian Anderson, Todd Kalas)
- Radio: Tampa Bay Rays Radio Network (English) (Andy Freed, Dave Wills, Todd Kalas); WGES (Spanish) (Ricardo Taveras, Enrique Oliu)

The Tampa Bay Rays 2012 season was the team's 15th season of baseball, and the fifth as the "Rays" (all at Tropicana Field). The Rays hoped to improve on their 91–71 record from 2011 and make the postseason for a franchise record third straight season. They finished the season 90–72, third place in the American League East, and third place in the American League Wild Card, missing the postseason for the first time since 2009.

== Offseason ==
On November 27, 2011, the Rays traded catcher John Jaso to the Seattle Mariners for relief pitcher Josh Lueke, as well as a player to be named later or cash.

The Rays signed catcher José Molina on November 28, 2011, to a one-year, $1.5 million contract with a $1.5 million club option for 2013, with a $300,000 buyout.

On December 13, 2011, the Rays acquired relief pitcher Burke Badenhop from the Miami Marlins in exchange for minor league catcher Jake Jefferies. At midnight that night, Badenhop was one of six arbitration eligible players that were tendered by the Rays, along with outfielder B. J. Upton, starting pitchers Jeff Niemann and David Price, and relief pitchers J. P. Howell and Joel Peralta. Not tendered was relief pitcher and former starting pitcher for the Rays, Andy Sonnanstine.

Relief pitcher Fernando Rodney was signed on January 5 to a one-year contract worth $1.75 million. The deal included a team option for 2013 worth $2.5 million or a $250,000 buyout. In 2009, while playing for the Detroit Tigers, Rodney made news at Tropicana Field when he threw a baseball into the stadium's press box from the field after converting a save. He was suspended for three games following the incident. After being signed by the Rays, he apologized for his actions.

On January 11, the Rays signed Luke Scott to a one-year contract with an option for 2013. He is expected to be the team's designated hitter primarily, though he could also be used at first base.

On January 20, the Rays signed Carlos Peña, bringing him back to the Rays for the 2012 season after just one season away with the Cubs. The contract is worth a year at $7.25 million. He is expected to be the everyday first baseman, as he was in his previous stint from 2007–2010. Outfielder Justin Ruggiano was designated for assignment on January 24 to make room on the 40-man roster.

The Rays announced on February 15 that manager Joe Maddon was given a 3-year contract extension worth $6 million, which would last through the 2015 season.

== Season standings ==
=== American League East ===
AL East
Team	W	L	Pct.	GB	Home	Road
New York Yankees	95	67	.586	—	51‍–‍30	44‍–‍37
Baltimore Orioles	93	69	.574	2	47‍–‍34	46‍–‍35
Tampa Bay Rays	90	72	.556	5	46‍–‍35	44‍–‍37
Toronto Blue Jays	73	89	.451	22	41‍–‍40	32‍–‍49
Boston Red Sox	69	93	.426	26	34‍–‍47	35‍–‍46

=== American League Wild Card ===
Division winners
Team	W	L	Pct.
New York Yankees	95	67	.586
Oakland Athletics	94	68	.580
Detroit Tigers	88	74	.543

Wild Card teams (Top 2 teams qualify for postseason)
Team	W	L	Pct.	GB
Texas Rangers	93	69	.574	—
Baltimore Orioles	93	69	.574	—
Tampa Bay Rays	90	72	.556	3
Los Angeles Angels of Anaheim	89	73	.549	4
Chicago White Sox	85	77	.525	8
Seattle Mariners	75	87	.463	18
Toronto Blue Jays	73	89	.451	20
Kansas City Royals	72	90	.444	21
Boston Red Sox	69	93	.426	24
Cleveland Indians	68	94	.420	25
Minnesota Twins	66	96	.407	27

=== Record vs. opponents ===
2012 American League record Source: MLB Standings Grid – 2012
Team	BAL	BOS	CWS	CLE	DET	KC	LAA	MIN	NYY	OAK	SEA	TB	TEX	TOR	NL
Baltimore	–	13–5	6–2	4–4	3–3	5–4	2–7	5–2	9–9	4–5	8–1	10–8	2–5	11–7	11–7
Boston	5–13	–	6–2	5–3	5–5	4–3	0–6	4–3	5–13	1–8	5–4	9–9	2–6	7–11	11–7
Chicago	2–6	2–6	–	11–7	6–12	6–12	3–5	14–4	5–2	3–3	8–1	4–3	6–3	6–4	9–9
Cleveland	4–4	3–5	7–11	–	10–8	8–10	5–4	6–12	1–5	2–8	4–4	4–4	4–5	2–4	8–10
Detroit	3–3	5–5	12–6	8–10	–	13–5	5–5	10–8	4–6	4–3	1–5	5–2	3–7	4–2	11–7
Kansas City	4–5	3–4	12–6	10–8	5–13	–	4–5	7–11	3–4	5–4	1–7	4–2	4–5	2–6	8–10
Los Angeles	7–2	6–0	5–3	4–5	5–5	5–4	–	6–3	4–5	9–10	11–8	1–9	10–9	4–4	12–6
Minnesota	2–5	3–4	4–14	12–6	8–10	11–7	3–6	–	3–4	4–5	2–8	1–5	2–8	2–5	9–9
New York	9–9	13–5	2–5	5–1	6–4	4–3	5–4	4–3	–	5–5	6–3	8–10	4–3	11–7	13–5
Oakland	5–4	8–1	3–3	8–2	3–4	4–5	10–9	5–4	5–5	–	12–7	5–4	11–8	5–4	10–8
Seattle	1–8	4–5	1–8	4–4	5–1	7–1	8–11	8–2	3–6	7–12	–	4–6	9–10	6–3	8–10
Tampa Bay	8–10	9–9	3–4	4–4	2–5	2–4	9–1	5–1	10–8	4–5	6–4	–	5–4	14–4	9–9
Texas	5–2	6–2	3–6	5–4	7–3	5–4	9–10	8–2	3–4	8–11	10–9	4–5	–	6–3	14–4
Toronto	7–11	11–7	4–6	4–2	2–4	6–2	4–4	5–2	7–11	4–5	3–6	4–14	3–6	–	9–9

- Source: MLB Standings Grid – 2012

== Regular season ==
2012 Game Log
April (15–8)

#	Date	Opponent	Score	Win	Loss	Save	Attendance	Record	Box
1	April 6	Yankees	7–6	Rodney (1–0)	Rivera (0–1)		34,078	1–0	
2	April 7	Yankees	8–6	Price (1–0)	Kuroda (0–1)	Rodney (1)	34,078	2–0	
3	April 8	Yankees	3–0	Hellickson (1–0)	Hughes (0–1)	Rodney (2)	30,413	3–0	
4	April 10	@ Tigers	2–5	Coke (1–0)	McGee (0–1)	Valverde (1)	22,574	3–1	
5	April 11	@ Tigers	4–2	Shields (1–0)	Verlander (0–1)	Rodney (3)	28,180	4–1	
6	April 12	@ Tigers	2–7	Balester (1–0)	Niemann (0–1)		30,288	4–2	
7	April 13	@ Red Sox	2–12	Beckett (1–1)	Price (1–1)		37,032	4–3	
8	April 14	@ Red Sox	5–13	Buchholz (1–0)	Badenhop (0–1)		38,024	4–4	
9	April 15	@ Red Sox	4–6	Padilla (1–0)	Moore (0–1)	Aceves (2)	38,024	4–5	
10	April 16	@ Red Sox	1–0	Shields (2–0)	Bard (0–2)	Rodney (4)	38,108	5–5	
11	April 17	@ Blue Jays	3–7	Romero (2–0)	Niemann (0–2)		15,331	5–6	
12	April 18	@ Blue Jays	12–2	Price (2–1)	Morrow (0–1)		15,828	6–6	
13	April 19	@ Blue Jays	9–4	Hellickson (2–0)	Álvarez (0–1)		18,976	7–6	
14	April 20	Twins	4–5	Maloney (1–0)	Gomes (0–1)	Capps (4)	18,763	7–7	
15	April 21	Twins	4–1	Shields (3–0)	Pavano (1–2)	Rodney (5)	31,774	8–7	
16	April 22	Twins	6–2	Niemann (1–2)	Liriano (0–3)		26,507	9–7	
17	April 24	Angels	5–0	Price (3–1)	Santana (0–4)		14,933	10–7	
18	April 25	Angels	3–2	Hellickson (3–0)	Wilson (2–2)	Rodney (6)	14,638	11–7	
19	April 26	Angels	4–3	Gomes (1–1)	Walden (0–1)		15,417	12–7	
20	April 27	@ Rangers	8–4	Shields (4–0)	Harrison (3–1)		47,496	13–7	
21	April 28	@ Rangers	2–7	Lewis (3–0)	Niemann (1–3)		49,197	13–8	
22	April 29	@ Rangers	5–2	Price (4–1)	Holland (2–2)	Rodney (7)	43,475	14–8	
23	April 30	Mariners	3–2 (12)	Howell (1–0)	League (0–2)		9,458	15–8	

May (14–14)

#	Date	Opponent	Score	Win	Loss	Save	Attendance	Record	Box
24	May 1	Mariners	3–1	Moore (1–1)	Noesí (1–3)	Rodney (8)	9,972	16–8	
25	May 2	Mariners	5–4	Shields (5–0)	Beavan (1–3)	Peralta (1)	9,837	17–8	
26	May 3	Mariners	4–3	Niemann (2–3)	Millwood (0–3)	Rodney (9)	11,575	18–8	
27	May 4	Athletics	7–2	Price (5–1)	Ross (1–2)	Peralta (2)	18,799	19–8	
28	May 5	Athletics	3–4 (12)	Fuentes (2–0)	Peralta (0–1)	Balfour (7)	23,890	19–9	
29	May 6	Athletics	5–9	Milone (4–2)	Moore (1–2)		23,873	19–10	
30	May 8	@ Yankees	3–5	Nova (4–1)	Shields (5–1)	Robertson (1)	37,086	19–11	
31	May 9	@ Yankees	4–1	Rodney (2–0)	Robertson (0–1)		38,024	20–11	
32	May 10	@ Yankees	3–5	Sabathia (5–0)	Price (5–2)	Soriano (1)	37,720	20–12	
33	May 11	@ Orioles	3–4	O'Day (3–0)	Peralta (0–2)	Johnson (10)	26,669	20–13	
34	May 12	@ Orioles	3–5	Matusz (2–4)	Moore (1–3)	Johnson (11)	32,862	20–14	
35	May 13	@ Orioles	9–8	Shields (6–1)	Arrieta (2–4)	Rodney (10)	29,552	21–14	
36	May 14	@ Blue Jays	7–1	Ramos (1–0)	Morrow (4–2)		15,289	22–14	
37	May 15	@ Blue Jays	4–3	Price (6–2)	Álvarez (3–3)	Rodney (11)	15,612	23–14	
38	May 16	Red Sox	2–1	Hellickson (4–0)	Buchholz (4–2)	Rodney (12)	20,843	24–14	
39	May 17	Red Sox	3–5	Doubront (4–1)	Moore (1–4)	Aceves (8)	19,842	24–15	
40	May 18	Braves	3–5	Hanson (5–3)	Shields (6–2)	Kimbrel (12)	19,693	24–16	
41	May 19	Braves	5–2	Cobb (1–0)	Delgado (2–4)	Rodney (13)	27,433	25–16	
42	May 20	Braves	0–2	Hudson (3–1)	Price (6–3)	Kimbrel (13)	24,759	25–17	
43	May 21	Blue Jays	2–6	Drabek (4–4)	Hellickson (4–1)		10,844	25–18	
44	May 22	Blue Jays	8–5	Davis (1–0)	Hutchison (3–2)	Rodney (14)	12,307	26–18	
45	May 23	Blue Jays	5–4 (11)	McGee (1–1)	Oliver (0–2)		11,471	27–18	
46	May 25	@ Red Sox	7–4	Cobb (2–0)	Lester (3–4)	Rodney (15)	37,594	28–18	
47	May 26	@ Red Sox	2–3	Hill (1–0)	Rodney (2–1)		38,099	28–19	
48	May 27	@ Red Sox	4–3	McGee (2–1)	Aceves (0–2)	Rodney (16)	37,844	29–19	
49	May 28	White Sox	1–2	Sale (6–2)	Moore (1–5)	Reed (5)	22,227	29–20	
50	May 29	White Sox	2–7	Humber (2–2)	Shields (6–3)		13,735	29–21	
51	May 30	White Sox	3–4	Jones (3–0)	Cobb (2–1)	Reed (6)	13,369	29–22	

June (12–15)

#	Date	Opponent	Score	Win	Loss	Save	Attendance	Record	Box
52	June 1	Orioles	5–0	Price (7–3)	Chen (4–2)	Rodney (17)	17,224	30–22	
53	June 2	Orioles	1–2	Matusz (5–5)	Hellickson (4–2)	Johnson (17)	21,693	30–23	
54	June 3	Orioles	8–4	Moore (2–5)	Arrieta (2–7)		21,693	31–23	
55	June 5	@ Yankees	0–7	Pettitte (3–2)	Shields (6–4)		40,537	31–24	
56	June 6	@ Yankees	1–4	Nova (7–2)	Cobb (2–2)	Soriano (8)	38,370	31–25	
57	June 7	@ Yankees	7–3	Price (8–3)	Sabathia (7–3)		39,891	32–25	
58	June 8	@ Marlins	5–1	Badenhop (1–1)	Nolasco (6–4)		29,628	33–25	
59	June 9	@ Marlins	13–4	Moore (3–5)	Zambrano (4–4)		30,963	34–25	
60	June 10	@ Marlins	4–2	Shields (7–4)	Sánchez (3–5)	Rodney (18)	31,111	35–25	
61	June 12	Mets	2–11	Young (1–0)	Cobb (2–3)		17,334	35–26	
62	June 13	Mets	1–9	Dickey (10–1)	Price (8–4)		18,496	35–27	
63	June 14	Mets	6–9	Santana (4–3)	Hellickson (4–3)	Francisco (16)	21,947	35–28	
64	June 15	Marlins	11–0	Moore (4–5)	Zambrano (4–5)		18,369	36–28	
65	June 16	Marlins	3–4 (15)	Webb (3–1)	Gomes (1–2)	Bell (14)	22,332	36–29	
66	June 17	Marlins	3–0	Cobb (3–3)	Johnson (4–5)	Rodney (19)	33,810	37–29	
67	June 19	@ Nationals	5–4	Price (9–4)	Wang (2–3)	Rodney (20)	27,835	38–29	
68	June 20	@ Nationals	2–3	Strasburg (9–1)	Archer (0–1)	Clippard (10)	27,485	38–30	
69	June 21	@ Nationals	2–5	Gonzalez (9–3)	Peralta (0–3)	Clippard (11)	29,551	38–31	
—	June 22	@ Phillies	Postponed (rain); Makeup: June 24						
70	June 23	@ Phillies	6–7	Papelbon (2–2)	McGee (2–2)		44,878	38–32	
71	June 24 (1)	@ Phillies	3–2	Price (10–4)	Bastardo (2–2)	Rodney (21)	44,785	39–32	
72	June 24 (2)	@ Phillies	7–3	Gomes (2–2)	Lee (0–4)		44,088	40–32	
73	June 25	@ Royals	0–8	Hochevar (5–7)	Cobb (3–4)		20,200	40–33	
74	June 26	@ Royals	2–8	Chen (7–6)	Archer (0–2)		25,982	40–34	
75	June 27	@ Royals	4–5	Crow (1–1)	Badenhop (1–2)	Broxton (19)	19,228	40–35	
76	June 28	Tigers	2–5	Scherzer (7–5)	Shields (7–5)	Valverde (14)	20,532	40–36	
77	June 29	Tigers	4–2	Price (11–4)	Verlander (8–5)	Rodney (22)	19,557	41–36	
78	June 30	Tigers	2–6	Porcello (6–5)	Hellickson (4–4)		29,443	41–37	

July (13–13)

#	Date	Opponent	Score	Win	Loss	Save	Attendance	Record	Box
79	July 1	Tigers	3–5	Smyly (3–3)	Cobb (3–5)	Valverde (15)	21,874	41–38	
80	July 2	Yankees	4–3	Moore (5–5)	Robertson (0–3)	Rodney (23)	21,742	42–38	
81	July 3	Yankees	7–4	Shields (8–5)	Nova (9–3)	Rodney (24)	26,453	43–38	
82	July 4	Yankees	3–4	Logan (3–0)	Farnsworth (0–1)	Soriano (19)	28,033	43–39	
83	July 5	@ Indians	1–3	Tomlin (5–5)	Hellickson (4–5)	Perez (24)	26,577	43–40	
84	July 6	@ Indians	10–3	Cobb (4–5)	Masterson (5–8)		28,734	44–40	
85	July 7	@ Indians	3–7	Jiménez (8–7)	Moore (5–6)		20,658	44–41	
86	July 8	@ Indians	7–6	Peralta (1–3)	Perez (0–2)	Rodney (25)	19,163	45–41	
All-Star Break
87	July 13	Red Sox	1–3	Morales (2–2)	Hellickson (4–6)	Aceves (20)	29,089	45–42	
88	July 14	Red Sox	5–3	Price (12–4)	Buchholz (8–3)	Rodney (26)	27,311	46–42	
89	July 15	Red Sox	3–7	Beckett (5–7)	Shields (8–6)		26,131	46–43	
90	July 16	Indians	2–3	McAllister (4–1)	Cobb (4–6)	Perez (26)	14,337	46–44	
91	July 17	Indians	4–2	Moore (6–6)	Tomlin (5–6)	Rodney (27)	15,712	47–44	
92	July 18	Indians	6–10	Rogers (1–2)	Farnsworth (0–2)		15,143	47–45	
93	July 19	Indians	6–0	Price (13–4)	Jiménez (8–9)		27,856	48–45	
94	July 20	Mariners	4–3 (14)	McGee (3–2)	Wilhelmsen (3–2)		14,143	49–45	
95	July 21	Mariners	1–2	Vargas (10–7)	Cobb (4–7)	Wilhelmsen (9)	18,800	49–46	
96	July 22	Mariners	1–2	Beavan (5–6)	Moore (6–7)	Wilhelmsen (10)	20,908	49–47	
97	July 24	@ Orioles	3–1	Hellickson (5–6)	Chen (8–6)	Rodney (28)	17,592	50–47	
98	July 25	@ Orioles	10–1	Price (14–4)	González (2–2)		19,582	51–47	
99	July 26	@ Orioles	2–6	Tillman (3–1)	Shields (8–7)		21,301	51–48	
100	July 27	@ Angels	1–3	Haren (8–8)	Cobb (4–8)	Frieri (12)	40,136	51–49	
101	July 28	@ Angels	3–0	Moore (7–7)	Wilson (9–7)	Rodney (29)	41,232	52–49	
102	July 29	@ Angels	2–0	Hellickson (6–6)	Greinke (9–4)	Rodney (30)	35,477	53–49	
103	July 30	@ Athletics	3–4 (15)	Norberto (3–1)	Farnsworth (0–3)		12,564	53–50	
104	July 31	@ Athletics	8–0	Shields (9–7)	Milone (9–8)		15,836	54–50	

August (17–11)

#	Date	Opponent	Score	Win	Loss	Save	Attendance	Record	Box
105	August 1	@ Athletics	4–1	Cobb (5–8)	Parker (7–5)	Rodney (31)	18,161	55–50	
106	August 3	Orioles	2–0	Moore (8–7)	Hunter (4–7)	Rodney (32)	18,410	56–50	
107	August 4	Orioles	0–4	Chen (10–6)	Hellickson (6–7)		20,612	56–51	
108	August 5	Orioles	0–1 (10)	Ayala (3–3)	Peralta (1–4)	Johnson (32)	29,530	56–52	
109	August 7	Blue Jays	4–1	Shields (10–7)	Happ (7–10)	Rodney (33)	13,823	57–52	
110	August 8	Blue Jays	3–2	Cobb (6–8)	Villanueva (6–2)	Rodney (34)	13,441	58–52	
111	August 9	Blue Jays	7–1	Moore (9–7)	Álvarez (7–9)		23,462	59–52	
112	August 10	@ Twins	12–6	Hellickson (7–7)	De Vries (2–3)		38,108	60–52	
113	August 11	@ Twins	4–2	Price (15–4)	Blackburn (4–8)	Rodney (35)	39,512	61–52	
114	August 12	@ Twins	7–3 (10)	Farnsworth (1–3)	Burnett (4–4)	Rodney (36)	35,327	62–52	
115	August 13	@ Mariners	4–1	Cobb (7–8)	Beavan (7–7)	Rodney (37)	16,205	63–52	
116	August 14	@ Mariners	2–3	Pryor (2–0)	Rodney (2–2)		17,065	63–53	
117	August 15	@ Mariners	0–1	Hernández (11–5)	Hellickson (7–8)		21,889	63–54	
118	August 16	@ Angels	7–0	Price (16–4)	Haren (8–10)		38,591	64–54	
119	August 17	@ Angels	12–3	Shields (11–7)	Weaver (15–3)		37,298	65–54	
120	August 18	@ Angels	10–8	McGee (4–2)	Jepsen (2–2)	Rodney (38)	41,086	66–54	
121	August 19	@ Angels	8–3	Moore (10–7)	Greinke (10–5)		36,789	67–54	
122	August 20	Royals	5–1	Hellickson (8–8)	Smith (4–5)		9,913	68–54	
123	August 21	Royals	0–1 (10)	Herrera (1–1)	Peralta (1–5)	Holland (6)	10,877	68–55	
124	August 22	Royals	5–3	Shields (12–7)	Mendoza (7–9)	Rodney (39)	11,892	69–55	
125	August 23	Athletics	5–0	Cobb (8–8)	Ross (2–9)		11,613	70–55	
126	August 24	Athletics	4–5	Cook (6–2)	Peralta (1–6)	Balfour (13)	18,913	70–56	
127	August 25	Athletics	2–4	McCarthy (7–5)	Hellickson (8–9)	Balfour (14)	18,187	70–57	
128	August 27	@ Rangers	5–6	Holland (9–6)	Price (16–5)	Nathan (26)	29,453	70–58	
129	August 28	@ Rangers	0–1	Darvish (13–9)	Shields (12–8)	Nathan (27)	30,700	70–59	
130	August 29	@ Rangers	8–4	McGee (5–2)	Harrison (15–8)		36,176	71–59	
131	August 30	@ Blue Jays	0–2	Villanueva (7–4)	Moore (10–8)	Janssen (18)	22,711	71–60	
132	August 31	@ Blue Jays	1–2	Morrow (8–5)	Hellickson (8–10)	Janssen (19)	20,158	71–61	

September/October (19–11)

#	Date	Opponent	Score	Win	Loss	Save	Attendance	Record	Box
133	September 1	@ Blue Jays	5–4	Davis (2–0)	Álvarez (7–12)	Rodney (40)	20,478	72–61	
134	September 2	@ Blue Jays	9–4	Price (17–5)	Romero (8–13)		18,568	73–61	
135	September 3	Yankees	4–3	Shields (13–8)	Robertson (1–5)	Rodney (41)	28,585	74–61	
136	September 4	Yankees	5–2	Cobb (9–8)	García (7–6)	Rodney (42)	17,652	75–61	
137	September 5	Yankees	4–6	Kuroda (13–10)	Moore (10–9)	Soriano (36)	16,711	75–62	
138	September 7	Rangers	3–1 (11)	Davis (3–0)	Lowe (0–1)		19,545	76–62	
139	September 8	Rangers	2–4 (10)	Adams (5–3)	Farnsworth (1–4)	Nathan (31)	18,702	76–63	
140	September 9	Rangers	6–0	Shields (14–8)	Oswalt (4–3)		20,522	77–63	
141	September 11	@ Orioles	2–9	Johnson (3–0)	Moore (10–10)		23,828	77–64	
142	September 12	@ Orioles	2–3	Johnson (2–1)	Farnsworth (1–5)		26,076	77–65	
143	September 13	@ Orioles	2–3 (14)	Wolf (5–10)	Archer (0–3)		25,130	77–66	
144	September 14	@ Yankees	6–4	Price (18–5)	Sabathia (13–6)	Rodney (43)	45,200	78–66	
145	September 15	@ Yankees	3–5	Nova (12–7)	Shields (14–9)	Soriano (39)	46,856	78–67	
146	September 16	@ Yankees	4–6	Kuroda (14–10)	Moore (10–11)	Soriano (40)	43,489	78–68	
147	September 17	Red Sox	2–5	Cook (4–10)	Cobb (9–9)		11,722	78–69	
148	September 18	Red Sox	5–7	Doubront (11–9)	Farnsworth (1–6)	Bailey (5)	11,502	78–70	
149	September 19	Red Sox	13–3	Archer (1–3)	Matsuzaka (1–6)		12,708	79–70	
150	September 20	Red Sox	7–4	Badenhop (2–2)	Bailey (1–1)		12,963	80–70	
151	September 21	Blue Jays	12–1	Shields (15–9)	Villanueva (7–6)		14,187	81–70	
152	September 22	Blue Jays	11–5	Badenhop (3–2)	Morrow (8–7)		15,699	82–70	
153	September 23	Blue Jays	3–0	Hellickson (9–10)	Jenkins (0–2)	Rodney (44)	18,985	83–70	
154	September 25	@ Red Sox	5–2	Price (19–5)	Buchholz (11–7)		37,045	84–70	
155	September 26	@ Red Sox	4–2	Cobb (10–9)	Lester (9–14)	Rodney (45)	37,247	85–70	
156	September 27	@ White Sox	3–2	Peralta (2–6)	Myers (3–8)	Rodney (46)	18,630	86–70	
157	September 28	@ White Sox	1–3	Floyd (11–11)	Hellickson (9–11)	Reed (29)	25,264	86–71	
158	September 29	@ White Sox	10–4	Moore (11–11)	Sale (17–8)		26,559	87–71	
159	September 30	@ White Sox	6–2	Price (20–5)	Quintana (6–6)		26,831	88–71	
160	October 1	Orioles	5–3	Cobb (11–9)	Chen (12–11)	Rodney (47)	13,666	89–71	
161	October 2	Orioles	0–1	González (9–4)	Shields (15–10)	Johnson (51)	13,460	89–72	
162	October 3	Orioles	4–1	Hellickson (10–11)	Tillman (9–3)	Rodney (48)	17,909	90–72	

== Roster ==
2012 Tampa Bay Rays
Roster
Pitchers: 22 Chris Archer; 31 Burke Badenhop; 53 Alex Cobb; 40 Wade Davis; 49 Dane De La Rosa; 43 Kyle Farnsworth; 47 Brandon Gomes; 58 Jeremy Hellickson; 39 J. P. Howell; 52 Josh Lueke; 57 Jake McGee; 55 Matt Moore; 34 Jeff Niemann; 62 Joel Peralta; 14 David Price; 27 Cesar Ramos; 56 Fernando Rodney; 33 James Shields	Catchers: 63,16 Chris Gimenez; 21 José Lobatón; 28 José Molina; 26 Stephen Vogt; Infielders: 15 Reid Brignac; 36 Brooks Conrad; 9 Elliot Johnson; 7 Jeff Keppinger; 3 Evan Longoria; 23 Carlos Peña; 10 Will Rhymes; 19 Ryan Roberts; 1 Sean Rodriguez; 30 Luke Scott; 44 Drew Sutton; 18 Ben Zobrist	Outfielders: 19 Brandon Allen; 5 Sam Fuld; 13 Ben Francisco; 47,11 Brandon Guyer; 8 Desmond Jennings; 20 Matthew Joyce; 35 Hideki Matsui; 24 Rich Thompson; 2 B. J. Upton	Manager: 70 Joe Maddon; Coaches: 46 Stan Boroski (bullpen); 77 Scott Cursi (bullpen catcher); 6 Tom Foley (third base); 25 George Hendrick (first base); 48 Jim Hickey (pitching); 4 Dave Martinez (bench); 17 Derek Shelton (hitting); 64 Don Zimmer (coach)

== Batting ==
Note: G = Games played; AB = At bats; R = Runs scored; H = Hits; 2B = Doubles; 3B = Triples; HR = Home runs; RBI = Runs batted in; AVG = Batting average; SB = Stolen bases

Player	G	AB	R	H	2B	3B	HR	RBI	AVG	SB
José Molina	102	251	27	56	9	0	8	32	.223	3
Carlos Peña	160	497	72	98	17	2	19	61	.197	2
Ben Zobrist	157	560	88	151	39	7	20	74	.270	14
Elliott Johnson	123	297	32	72	10	2	6	33	.242	18
Evan Longoria	74	273	39	79	14	0	17	55	.289	2
Desmond Jennings	132	505	85	124	19	7	13	47	.246	31
B. J. Upton	146	573	79	141	29	3	28	78	.246	31
Matt Joyce	124	399	55	96	18	3	17	59	.241	4
Luke Scott	96	314	35	72	22	1	14	55	.229	5
Jeff Keppinger	115	385	46	125	15	1	9	40	.325	1
Sean Rodriguez	112	301	36	64	14	1	6	32	.213	5
Ryan Roberts	60	187	23	40	10	0	6	18	.214	4
José Lobatón	69	167	16	37	10	0	2	20	.222	0
Will Rhymes	47	123	11	28	2	1	1	8	.228	1
Chris Gimenez	42	100	10	26	4	0	1	9	.260	0
Sam Fuld	44	98	14	25	3	2	0	5	.255	7
Hideki Matsui	34	95	7	14	1	0	2	7	.147	0
Brooks Conrad	24	58	4	10	5	0	2	9	.172	0
Ben Francisco	24	57	4	13	5	0	2	8	.228	0
Drew Sutton	18	48	2	13	4	0	0	6	.271	0
Steven Vogt	18	25	0	0	0	0	0	0	.000	0
Rich Thompson	23	22	5	2	0	0	0	1	.091	6
Reid Brignac	16	21	1	2	0	0	0	1	.095	0
Brandon Allen	7	13	3	2	0	0	1	3	.154	0
Brandon Guyer	3	7	2	1	0	0	1	1	.143	0
Pitcher totals	162	22	1	2	0	0	0	3	.091	0
Team totals	162	5398	697	1293	250	30	175	665	.240	134

== Pitching ==
Note: W = Wins; L = Losses; ERA = Earned run average; G = Games pitched; GS = Games started; SV = Saves; IP = Innings pitched; H = Hits allowed; R = Runs allowed; ER = Earned runs allowed; BB = Walks allowed; K = Strikeouts

Player	W	L	ERA	G	GS	SV	IP	H	R	ER	BB	K
James Shields	15	10	3.52	33	33	0	227.2	208	103	89	58	223
David Price	20	5	2.56	31	31	0	211.0	173	63	60	59	205
Matt Moore	11	11	3.81	31	31	0	177.1	158	85	75	81	175
Jeremy Hellickson	10	11	3.10	31	31	0	177.0	163	68	61	59	124
Alex Cobb	11	9	4.03	23	23	0	136.1	130	67	61	40	106
Fernando Rodney	2	2	0.60	76	0	48	74.2	43	9	5	15	76
Wade Davis	3	0	2.43	54	0	0	70.1	48	20	19	29	87
Joel Peralta	2	6	3.63	76	0	2	67.0	49	28	27	17	84
Burke Badenhop	3	2	3.03	66	0	0	62.1	63	24	21	12	42
Jake McGee	5	2	1.95	69	0	0	55.1	33	13	12	11	73
J.P. Howell	1	0	3.04	55	0	0	50.1	39	17	17	22	42
Jeff Niemann	2	3	3.08	8	8	0	38.0	30	17	13	12	34
Cesar Ramos	1	0	2.10	17	1	0	30.0	19	7	7	10	29
Chris Archer	1	3	4.60	6	4	0	29.1	23	17	15	13	36
Kyle Farnsworth	1	6	4.00	34	0	0	27.0	22	13	12	14	25
Brandon Gomes	2	2	5.09	15	0	0	17.2	16	12	10	12	15
Dane De La Rosa	0	0	12.60	5	0	0	5.0	7	7	2	2	5
Josh Lueke	0	0	18.90	3	0	0	3.1	9	7	7	3	2
Team totals	90	72	3.19	162	162	50	1459.2	1233	577	518	469	1383

== Farm system ==
Level	Team	League	Manager
AAA	Durham Bulls	International League	Charlie Montoyo
AA	Montgomery Biscuits	Southern League	Billy Gardner Jr.
A	Charlotte Stone Crabs	Florida State League	Jim Morrison
A	Bowling Green Hot Rods	Midwest League	Brady Williams
A-Short Season	Hudson Valley Renegades	New York–Penn League	Jared Sandberg
Rookie	Princeton Rays	Appalachian League	Mike Johns
Rookie	GCL Rays	Gulf Coast League	Paul Hoover

LEAGUE CHAMPIONS: Hudson Valley
