= Charlie Furbush =

American baseball player (born 1986)

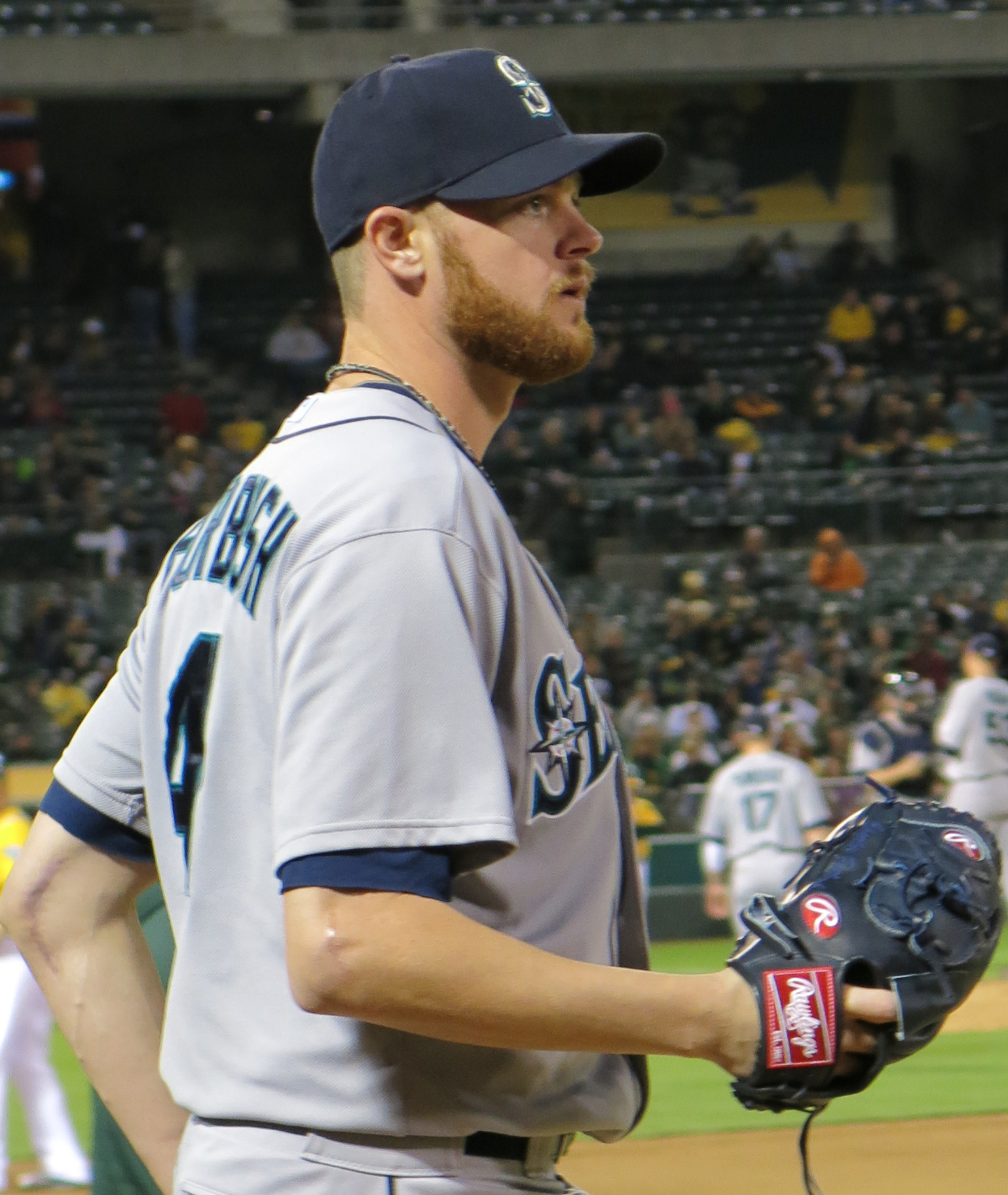
- Furbush with the Seattle Mariners in 2014
- Pitcher
- Born: April 11, 1986 (age 39); South Portland, Maine, U.S.
- Batted: Left Threw: Left

MLB debut
- May 23, 2011, for the Detroit Tigers

Last MLB appearance
- July 7, 2015, for the Seattle Mariners

MLB statistics
- Win–loss record: 13–24
- Earned run average: 3.97
- Strikeouts: 268
- Stats at Baseball Reference

Teams
- Detroit Tigers (2011); Seattle Mariners (2011–2015)

Career highlights and awards
- Pitched a combined no-hitter on June 8, 2012

Charles Roderick Furbush (born April 11, 1986) is an American former professional baseball pitcher. He played in Major League Baseball (MLB) for the Detroit Tigers and Seattle Mariners.

== Early life and career ==
Furbush was born in South Portland, Maine and attended South Portland High School. He went on to St. Joseph's College of Maine, where he was recruited to play at Louisiana State University. In 2005 and 2006, he played collegiate summer baseball for the Hyannis Mets of the Cape Cod Baseball League, where he threw a no-hitter, was named the western division's starting pitcher in the league all-star game, and was named the top New England prospect in 2006. While with Louisiana State in 2007, Furbush went 3–9 with a 4.95 ERA in 16 starts, striking out 88 batters in 87 innings.

== Professional career ==
=== Detroit Tigers ===
==== Minor leagues ====
Furbush was drafted by the Detroit Tigers in the 4th round, with the 151st overall selection, of the 2007 Major League Baseball draft and began his professional career that year.

Furbush appeared in 12 games between the rookie-level Gulf Coast League Tigers and West Michigan Whitecaps in 2007, making 10 starts and going 6–1 with a 2.34 ERA, striking out 69 batters in 61 2/3 innings. He did not pitch in 2008 due to recovery from Tommy John surgery. With the Lakeland Flying Tigers in 2009, Furbush went 6–7 with a 3.96 ERA in 24 games (23 starts). He split 2010 between Lakeland, (13 starts), the Double-A Erie SeaWolves (five starts), and Triple-A Toledo Mud Hens (nine starts), going a combined 8–9 with a 4.25 ERA. He struck out 183 batters in 159 innings.

==== Major leagues ====
On May 21, 2011, Furbush was promoted to the major leagues for the first time to replace Brad Thomas, who was placed on the 15-day disabled list with left elbow inflammation. He made his Major League debut on May 23, 2011, after coming into relief for starter Phil Coke who appeared to hurt his ankle slipping on the wet grass after a short start of only 3 1/3 innings pitched and a 1–0 Tigers deficit against the Tampa Bay Rays. Furbush issued a base on balls to the first batter he faced, Sean Rodriguez, to load the bases. He then struck out Felipe López and Kelly Shoppach to end the inning. He pitched 3 2/3 innings, allowing two hits, one base on balls, and three strikeouts before being replaced by Joaquín Benoit for the start of the eighth inning. The Tigers came back to score two runs under Furbush and eventually won the game 6–3, earning Furbush a win in his first Major League game. On June 30, Furbush was moved to the starting rotation, replacing Phil Coke.

=== Seattle Mariners ===
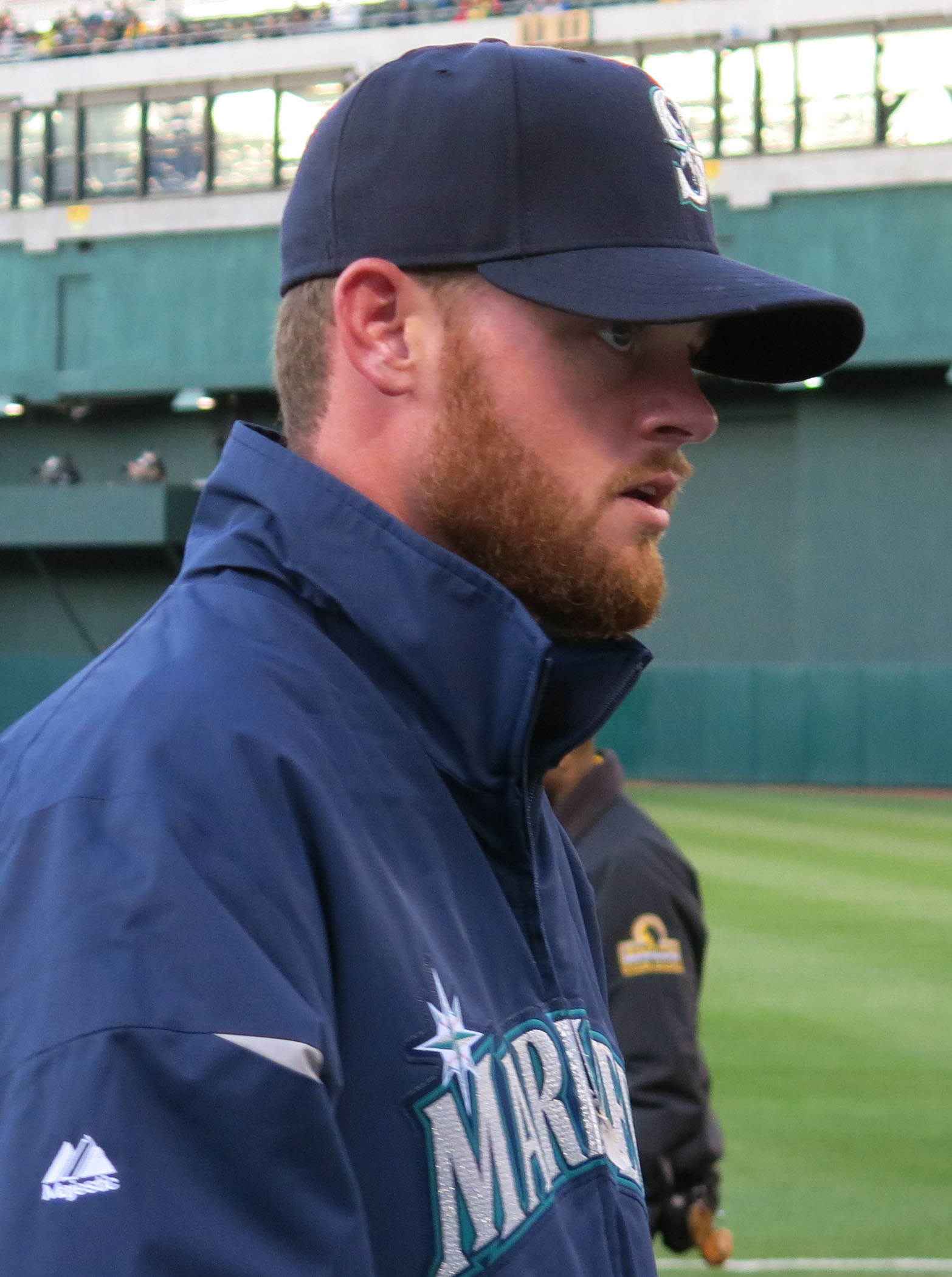
Furbush with the Mariners

On July 30, 2011, Furbush was traded to the Seattle Mariners along with Casper Wells, Francisco Martínez, and player to be named later Chance Ruffin from the Detroit Tigers in exchange for David Pauley and Doug Fister. He made 11 appearances (10 starts) for Seattle down the stretch, but struggled to a 3-7 record and 6.62 ERA with 41 strikeouts over 53 innings of work.

On June 8, 2012, Furbush combined with Kevin Millwood, Brandon League, Tom Wilhelmsen, Stephen Pryor, and Lucas Luetge to no-hit the Los Angeles Dodgers. In 48 appearances for the Mariners during the year, he compiled a 5-2 record and 2.72 ERA with 53 strikeouts across 46 1/3 innings pitched.

Furbush appeared a career-high 71 games for the Mariners in 2013, posting a 3.74 ERA and compiling 80 strikeouts in 65 innings. On December 17, 2013, Furbush signed a one-year contract extension with the Mariners.

Furbush made 67 appearances out of the bullpen for Seattle in 2014, posting a 1-5 record and 3.61 ERA with 51 strikeouts and one save across 42 1/3 innings pitched. He made 33 relief appearances for the Mariners in 2015, compiling a 1-1 record and 2.08 ERA with 17 strikeouts over 21 2/3 innings of work. On August 21, 2015, Furbush was diagnosed with a partially torn rotator cuff and biceps tendinitis, and missed the remainder of the season.

Furbush pursued a non-surgical rehabilitation for his rotator cuff injury, but experienced continued tightness in the shoulder after throwing sessions. On March 30, 2016, it was announced that Furbush would miss "several months" after undergoing a blood injection therapy to his shoulder. On August 10, Furbush announced that he would undergo surgery to fix a partially torn rotator cuff, with an expected recovery time of 12–18 months; as a result, he did not pitch in the 2016 season. On November 2, Furbush was removed from the 40-man roster and sent outright to the Triple-A Tacoma Rainiers. He elected free agency two days later.

=== Retirement ===
On March 7, 2019, Furbush announced his retirement from baseball, citing a failure to return to full health despite numerous procedures and rehabilitation efforts. In January 2022, it was reported that he was selling advertising time for Seattle radio station ESPN 710 and was said by one 710 staffer to be "a great dude."

== Pitching style ==
Furbush threw a steady mix of five pitches in his career. He led off with a four-seam fastball in the 88–93 mph range, and he had a sinker with similar speed that he threw mostly to right-handed hitters. His main off-speed pitch to lefties was a curveball at 76–79 mph, although he also liked to mix in a slider at 80–85 mph. Against righties, Furbush usually dropped the slider in favor of an 80–84 mph changeup. Against hitters from both sides of the plate, Furbush relied heavily on his curveball in 2-strike counts.

| Preceded by Johan Santana | No-hit game June 8, 2012 (with Millwood, Pryor, Luetge, League, & Wilhelmsen) | Succeeded by Matt Cain |
