= Lucas Luetge =

American baseball player (born 1987)

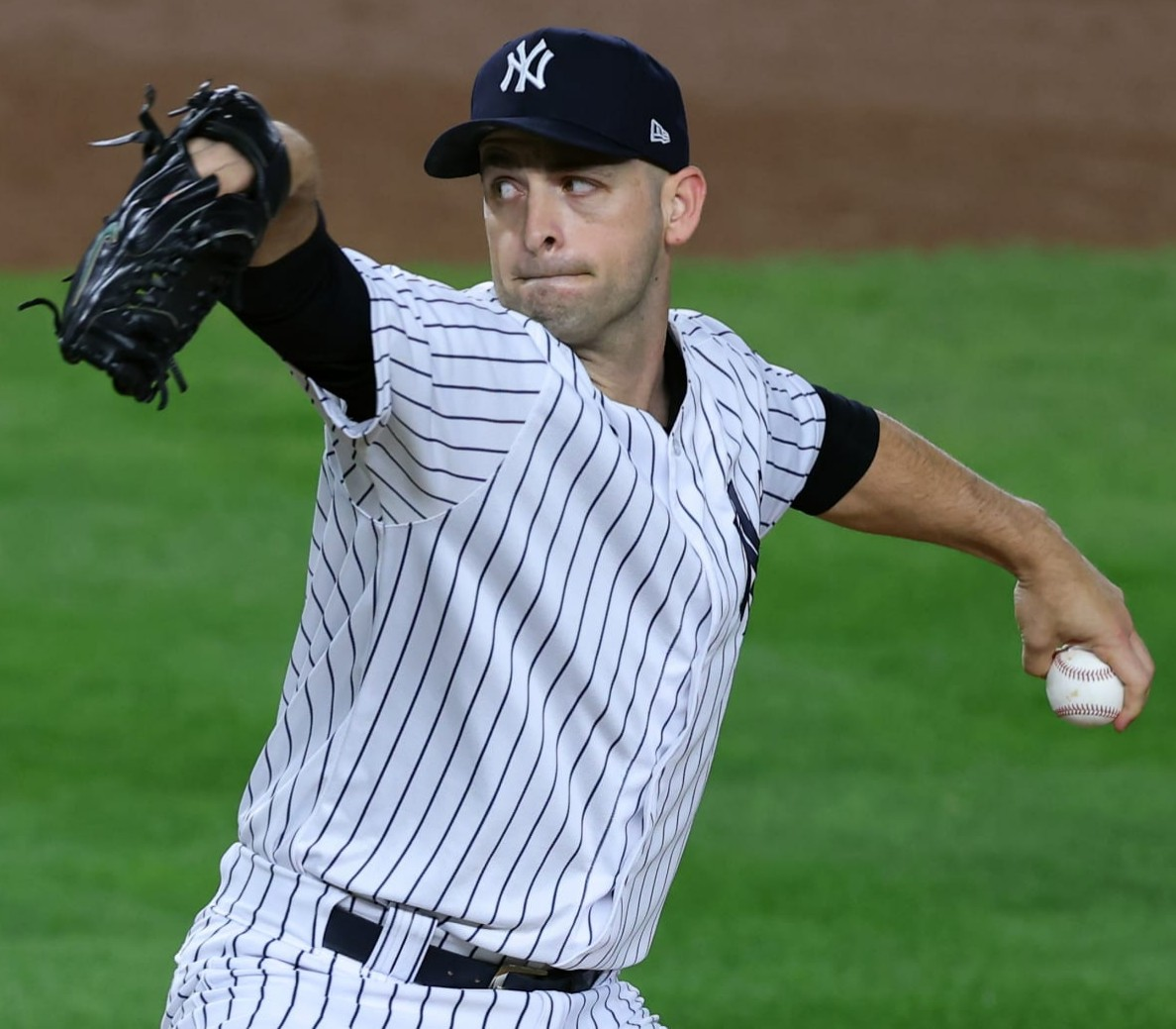
- Luetge pitching for the New York Yankees in April 2021
- Pitcher
- Born: March 24, 1987 (age 39); Brenham, Texas, U.S.
- Batted: Left Threw: Left

MLB debut
- April 7, 2012, for the Seattle Mariners

Last MLB appearance
- September 18, 2023, for the Atlanta Braves

MLB statistics
- Win–loss record: 12–11
- Earned run average: 3.60
- Strikeouts: 226
- Stats at Baseball Reference

Teams
- Seattle Mariners (2012–2015); New York Yankees (2021–2022); Atlanta Braves (2023)

Career highlights and awards
- Pitched a combined no-hitter on June 8, 2012

Lucas Lester Luetge (/ˈlɪtki/ LIT-kee born March 24, 1987) is an American former professional baseball pitcher. He played in Major League Baseball (MLB) for the Seattle Mariners, New York Yankees, and Atlanta Braves from 2012 to 2015 and 2021 to 2023.

== Career ==
=== Amateur ===
Luetge attended Bellville High School in Bellville, Texas. He enrolled at San Jacinto College, where he played college baseball, where he had an 11–3 record and 3.56 ERA over two seasons. The Chicago White Sox drafted him twice without signing him, in the 31st round of the 2005 Major League Baseball (MLB) Draft out of high school, then in the 18th round of the 2006 MLB Draft, after his first season in junior college. Luetge then transferred to Rice University, where he played baseball for the Rice Owls.

=== Milwaukee Brewers ===
The Milwaukee Brewers drafted Luetge in the 21st round, with the 638th overall selection, of the 2008 Major League Baseball draft. He spent his first professional season with the rookie-level Helena Brewers and Single-A West Virginia Power. Luetge spent the 2009 season with the High-A Brevard County Manatees, posting a 6-7 record and 4.48 ERA with 75 strikeouts in 92 1/3 innings pitched across 27 games.

Luetge split the 2010 campaign between Brevard County and the Double-A Huntsville Stars. In 39 appearances for the two affiliates, he compiled an aggregate 4-3 record and 2.95 ERA with 68 strikeouts across 79 1/3 innings pitched. Luetge made 46 appearances for Huntsville in 2011, recording a 3.13 ERA with 69 strikeouts and three saves over 69 innings of work.

=== Seattle Mariners ===
The Seattle Mariners selected Luetge in the Rule 5 Draft on December 8, 2011.

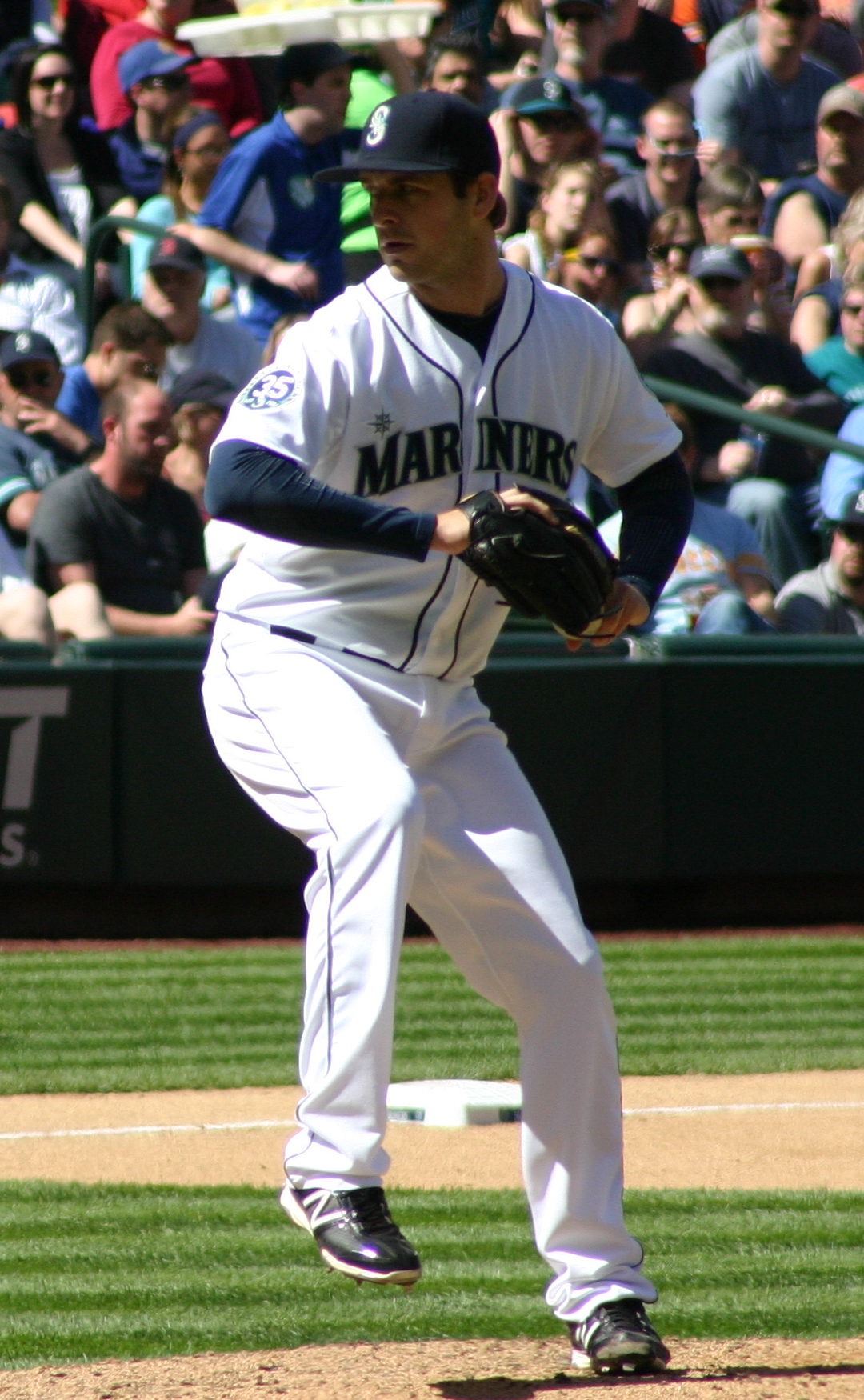
Luetge pitches for the Mariners in 2012

On April 7, 2012, Luetge made his MLB debut, striking out his only batter on 3 pitches and earning a hold. On June 8, he was one of six Mariners pitchers that no-hit the Los Angeles Dodgers. He recorded one out, a James Loney sacrifice bunt. Luetge was the fourth pitcher, following Kevin Millwood, Charlie Furbush, and Stephen Pryor. He did not allow an earned run in his first 25 appearances, a streak that lasted until June 19. In his rookie season, Luetge registered a 3.98 ERA with 38 strikeouts and two saves in 40 2/3 innings of work. The next year, Luetge pitched to a 4.86 ERA in 35 appearances, along with 27 strikeouts in 37 innings pitched, while splitting time between Seattle and the Triple-A Tacoma Rainiers. Luetge spent 2014 up and down between Tacoma and Seattle as well, recording a 5.00 ERA with seven strikeouts in nine innings pitched in the majors.

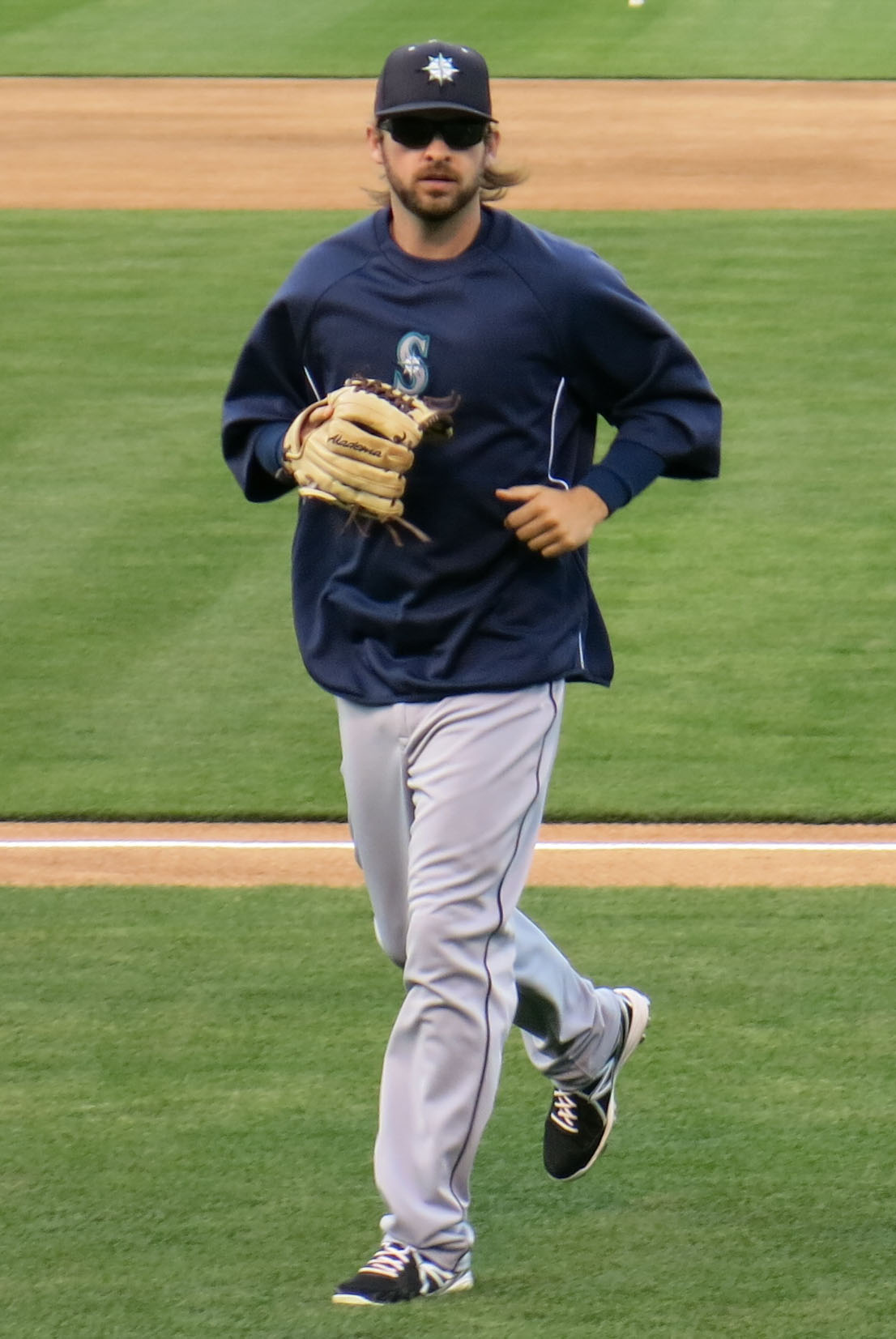
Luetge with the Mariners in 2013

Luetgue pitched once for Seattle in 2015, thowing 2 1/3 scoreless innings in relief on April 25. He would not pitch in the majors again until 2021. After spending most of the season in Triple-A, Luetge was outrighted off of the Mariners 40-man roster on September 5. On November 6, he elected free agency.

=== Los Angeles Angels ===
On November 17, 2015, Luetge signed a minor league contract with the Los Angeles Angels. On May 22, 2016, Luetge was selected to the Angels' active roster, however he was designated for assignment on May 25 without making an appearance for the big league club. On May 27, he cleared waivers and was sent outright to the Triple-A Salt Lake Bees, where he spent the remainder of the season. On October 3, Luetge elected free agency.

=== Cincinnati Reds ===
On November 25, 2016, Luetge signed a minor league contract with the Cincinnati Reds. Luetge was assigned to the Triple-A Louisville Bats. On June 1, 2017, the Reds released Luetge.

=== Baltimore Orioles ===
On June 4, 2017, Luetge signed a minor league deal with the Baltimore Orioles. He pitched in four games for the Triple-A Norfolk Tides, logging a 4.50 ERA with three strikeouts in 4 innings of work. Luetge elected free agency on November 6. Luetge had Tommy John surgery in mid-2017, which kept him from pitching in all of 2018.

=== Arizona Diamondbacks ===
On February 4, 2019, Luetge signed a minor league contract with the Arizona Diamondbacks. In 2019, his 55 games pitched tied for the lead in the minor leagues. After splitting the season with the Double-A Jackson Generals and Triple-A Reno Aces, Luetge elected free agency on November 4.

=== Oakland Athletics ===
On November 25, 2019, Luetge signed a minor league contract with the Oakland Athletics that included an invitation to major league spring training. Luetge did not play in a game in 2020 due to the cancellation of the minor league season because of the COVID-19 pandemic. He was added to the Athletics' 60-man player pool for the season but spent the entire year at the alternate site. Luetge became a free agent on November 2, 2020.

=== New York Yankees ===
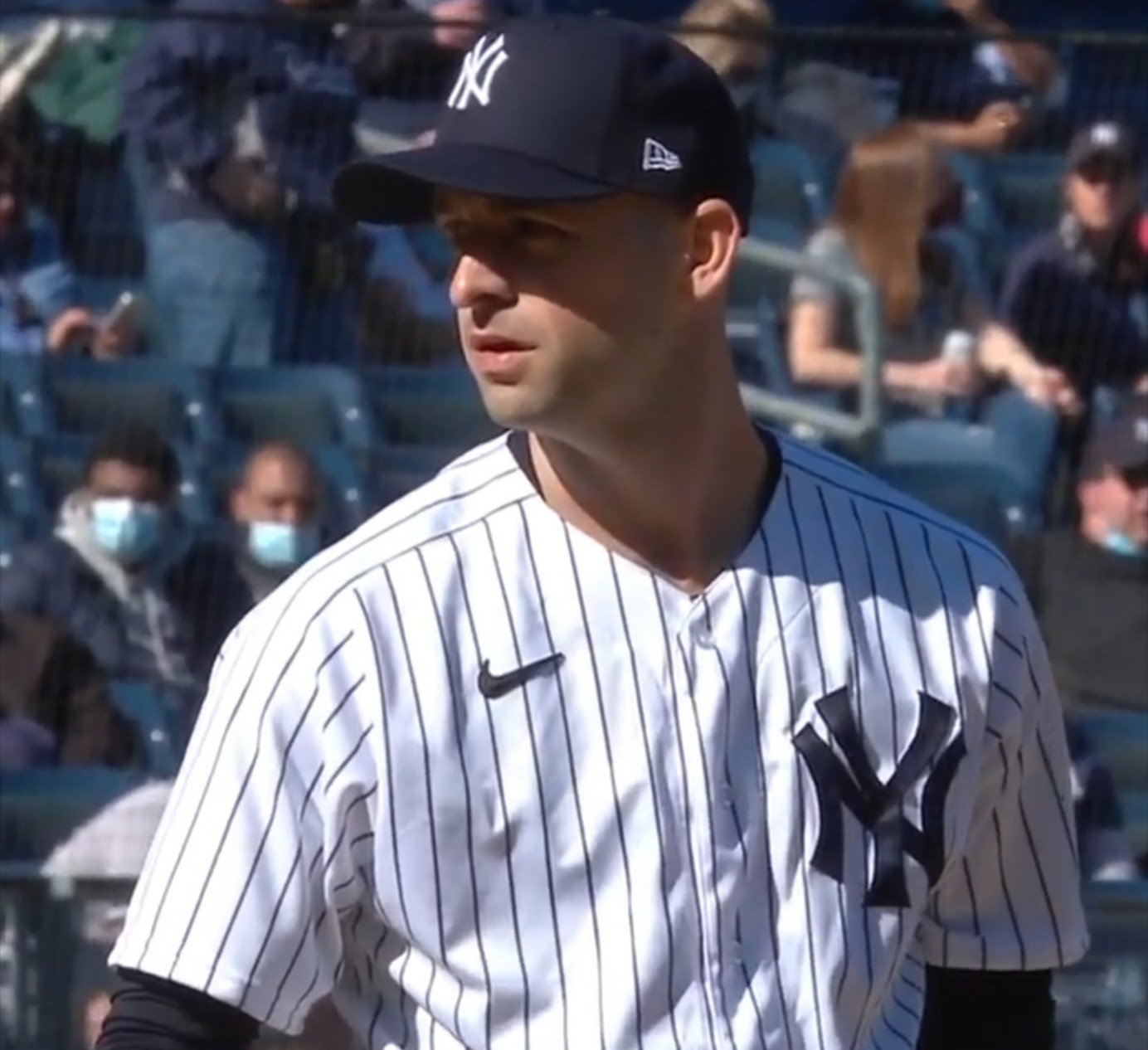
Luetge pitching for the New York Yankees in 2021

Luetge signed a minor league contract with the New York Yankees for the 2021 season, receiving a non-roster invitation to spring training. After a strong spring training in which he accrued 18 strikeouts in 10 1/3 innings pitched, Luetge was selected to the Yankees' Opening Day roster on March 31. On April 3, 2021, in a game against the Toronto Blue Jays, Luetge appeared in his first major league game since April 25, 2015. He finished the season with a 2.74 ERA in 72 1/3 innings across 57 appearances.

Luetge made the Yankees bullpen for the 2022 season. In 2022 he was 4–4 with a 2.67 ERA. He was designated for assignment on December 21, following the signing of Tommy Kahnle.

=== Atlanta Braves ===
On December 28, 2022, the Yankees traded Luetge to the Atlanta Braves for minor leaguers Caleb Durbin and Indigo Diaz. On January 13, 2023, Luetge signed a one-year, $1.55 million contract with the Braves, avoiding salary arbitration. Luetge made 9 appearances out of Atlanta's bullpen, but struggled immensely, with a 10.24 ERA and 10 strikeouts in 9 2/3 innings pitched. On May 30, Luetge was designated for assignment by the Braves following the promotion of AJ Smith-Shawver. He cleared waivers and was sent outright to the Triple-A Gwinnett Stripers on June 6. On July 13, Luetge returned to Atlanta's major league roster. On July 24, Luetge was designated for assignment by the Braves following Atlanta's acquisition of Pierce Johnson. He again cleared waivers and was outrighted to Triple-A on July 26. Luetge once more had his contract selected to the major league roster on September 18. He tossed two scoreless innings against the Philadelphia Phillies but was designated for assignment the following day. On September 21, Luetge cleared waivers and was outrighted to Gwinnett. He elected free agency on October 13.

=== Boston Red Sox ===
On February 10, 2024, Luetge signed a minor league contract with the Boston Red Sox. In 31 appearances for the Triple-A Worcester Red Sox, he compiled a 3.02 ERA with 47 strikeouts and 6 saves across 41 2/3 innings pitched. On August 3, Luetge opted out of his contract and elected free agency.

=== Chicago Cubs ===
On August 7, 2024, Luetge signed a minor league contract with the Chicago Cubs. In 13 appearances for the Triple-A Iowa Cubs, he struggled to a 6.48 ERA with 24 strikeouts across 16 2/3 innings pitched. Luetge elected free agency following the season on November 4.

Luetge announced his retirement from professional baseball via Instagram on February 28, 2025.

== Scouting report ==
Luetge threw a variety of pitches. When he debuted with the Mariners, he had a four-seam and two-seam fastball that average about 90 mph, a sweeping slider in the low 80s, a curveball in the mid-upper 70s, and an occasional changeup. When he returned to the majors in 2021, he threw a cutter, curveball, and slider or sweeper.

Luetge often worked as a left-handed specialist. In his career, lefties had a .605 on-base plus slugging (OPS) against him, while righties hit him better, with a .769 OPS.

== Personal life ==
Luetge and his wife Lacie grew up together in Texas and began dating in high school. They have three children.

Luetge's parents are Rocky and Melissa Luetge. They own a convenience store in Industry, Texas. Luetge has two brothers, Lance and Leif. Lance pitched in college and independent baseball from 2007 to 2009. His grandfather, Jack Flinn, was a high school basketball coach.

Luetge grew up rooting for the Houston Astros. He also raised and showed pigs and other livestock. He said in 2014 that he loved the American television series The Office.

== See also ==
- Rule 5 draft results

Achievements
Preceded by Johan Santana	No-hit game June 8, 2012 (with Millwood, Furbush, Pryor, League, & Wilhelmsen)	Succeeded by Matt Cain
