= Brandon League =

American baseball player (born 1983)

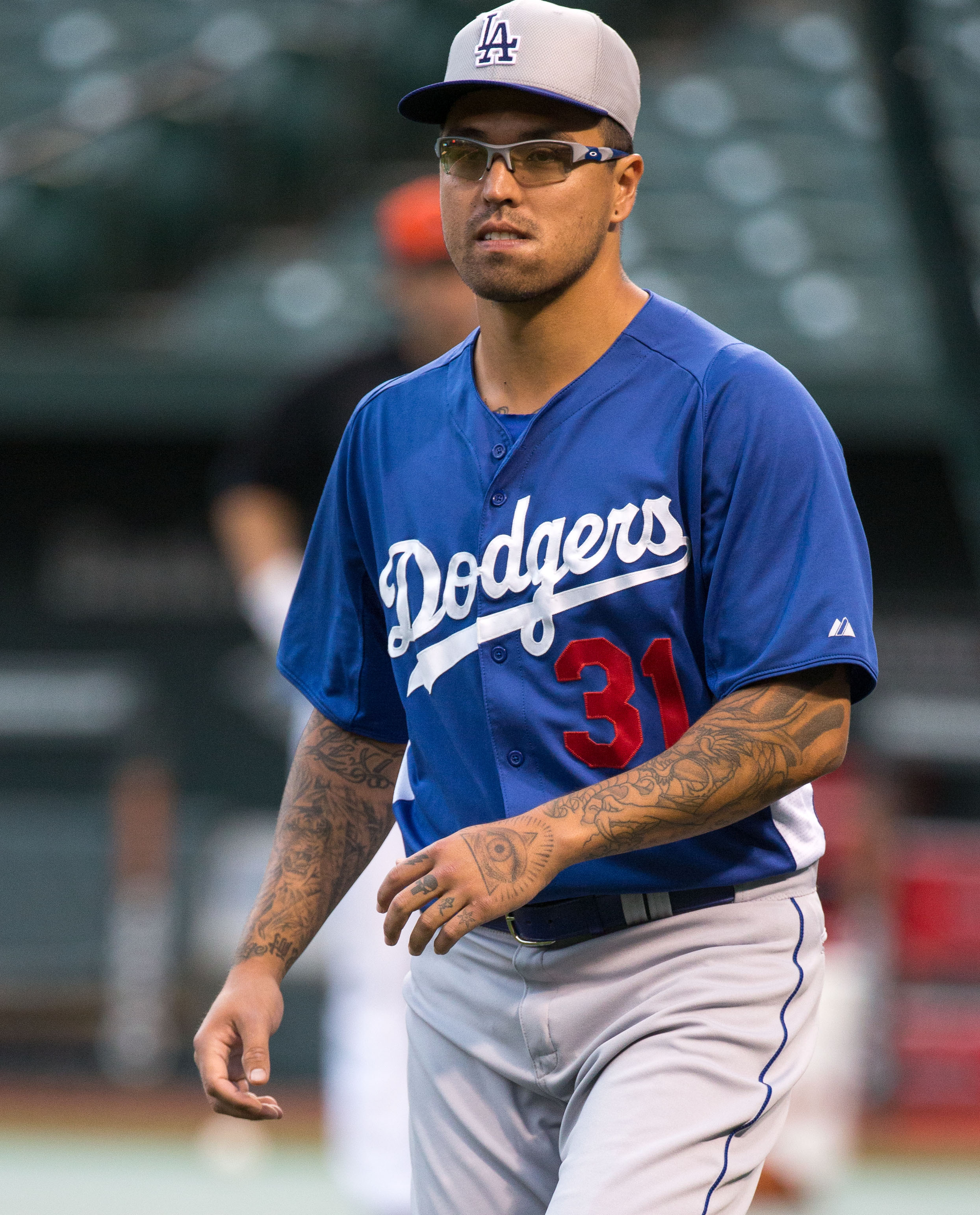
- League with the Los Angeles Dodgers
- Pitcher
- Born: March 16, 1983 (age 43); Sacramento, California, U.S.
- Batted: Right Threw: Right

MLB debut
- September 21, 2004, for the Toronto Blue Jays

Last MLB appearance
- September 27, 2014, for the Los Angeles Dodgers

MLB statistics
- Win–loss record: 27–35
- Earned run average: 3.65
- Strikeouts: 375
- Saves: 74
- Stats at Baseball Reference

Teams
- Toronto Blue Jays (2004–2009); Seattle Mariners (2010–2012); Los Angeles Dodgers (2012–2014)

Career highlights and awards
- All-Star (2011); Pitched a combined no-hitter on June 8, 2012
Medals
Men's baseball
Representing United States
World Junior Baseball Championship
Silver medal – second place	2000 Edmonton	Team

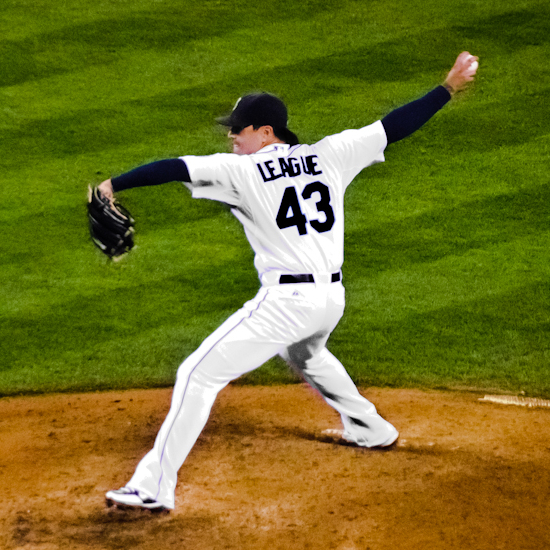
League pitching for the Seattle Mariners in 2010

Brandon Paul League (born March 16, 1983) is an American former professional baseball pitcher. He played in Major League Baseball (MLB) for the Toronto Blue Jays, Seattle Mariners, and Los Angeles Dodgers. He is a former closer and one-time All-Star.

== Professional career ==
=== Toronto Blue Jays ===
He was drafted by the Toronto Blue Jays in the second round of the 2001 MLB draft out of Saint Louis School, and was signed on July 3, 2001. He made his major league debut on September 21, 2004 against the New York Yankees as he pitched a solid inning and a third.

Following League's breakout season in 2006, he engaged in strength conditioning during the offseason, and at the behest of the Blue Jays, did not pitch until spring training. As a result, he overdeveloped some shoulder muscles, resulting in a significant drop in his fastball velocity. League was placed on the 60-day disabled list and missed the majority of the 2007 season. Both his velocity and effectiveness recovered the following season.

=== Seattle Mariners ===
On December 22, 2009, League was traded to the Seattle Mariners along with minor-league outfielder Johermyn Chávez for pitcher Brandon Morrow. He signed a one-year, $1.08 million contract for 2010. Because of an injury to David Aardsma, League started the 2011 season as the Mariners' closer. He was selected to his first All-Star game as a relief pitcher for the 2011 All-Star game. In a 2011 interview, veteran outfielder Coco Crisp named League as one of the four toughest pitchers he had ever faced. On June 8, 2012, League was one of six Mariners to throw a combined no-hitter against the Los Angeles Dodgers at Safeco Field. After a series of blown saves, League was replaced by Tom Wilhelmsen as closer. In 2 1/2 seasons with the Mariners, League had converted a total of 52 saves in 69 chances with a 3.26 ERA.

=== Los Angeles Dodgers ===
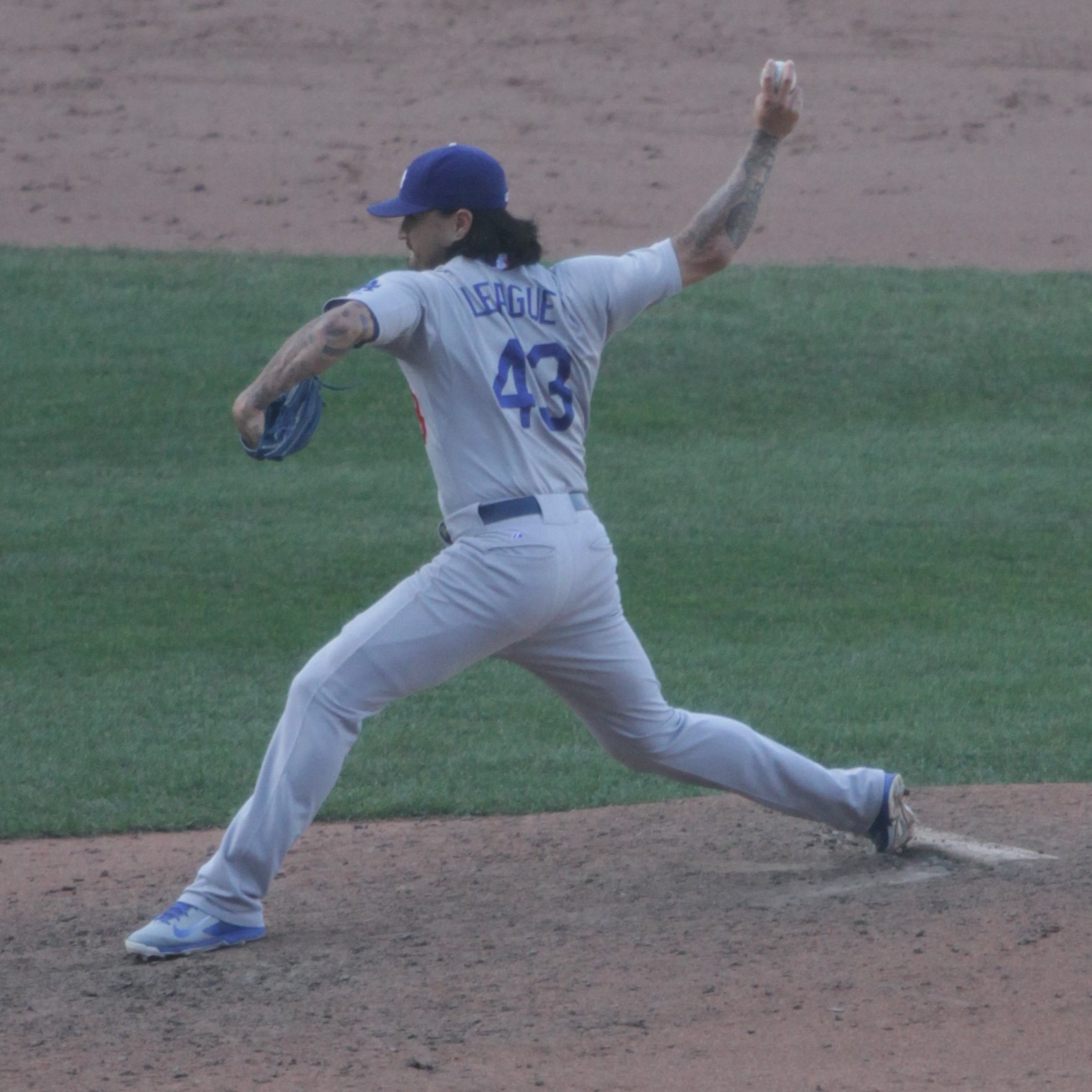
League pitching for the Dodgers in 2014

On July 30, 2012, League was traded to the Los Angeles Dodgers for minor leaguers Leon Landry and Logan Bawcom. He became the Dodgers closer in September after Kenley Jansen was sidelined with an irregular heartbeat. In 28 games with the Dodgers, he was 2–1 with a 2.30 ERA and six saves. On October 30, the Dodgers re-signed League to a three-year, $22.5 million deal with a vesting option worth $7.5 million for 2016. On June 11, League was demoted from the closer role after blowing his fourth save in 17 chances, and he was replaced by Jansen. He was used primarily in low pressure situations the rest of the season. Overall, in 2013, he was 6-4 with a 5.30 ERA in 58 appearances, with 14 early season saves. In 2014, the Dodgers used League primarily in middle relief. He finished the season with a 2–3 record and a 2.57 ERA in 63 games.

League underwent an MRI during spring training in 2015 which revealed serious shoulder damage, causing him to miss the first couple months of the season. After spending a month rehabbing in the minors, League was designated for assignment on July 2, 2015. He was released on July 10.

=== New Britain Bees ===
League did not play professional baseball at any level in 2016. On January 7, 2017, League signed a minor league contract with the Kansas City Royals that included an invitation to spring training. He was released prior to the start of the season on March 19.

On April 20, 2017, League signed with the New Britain Bees of the Atlantic League of Professional Baseball. In 44 appearances for the Bees, he compiled a 2-3 record and 4.57 ERA with 38 strikeouts and 1 save across 43 1/3 innings pitched. League became a free agent after the season.

== Coaching career ==
On January 30, 2025, the Cleveland Guardians hired League to serve as the pitching coach for their Triple-A affiliate, the Columbus Clippers. In 2026, he was named as an assistant pitching coach for the Arizona Complex League Guardians, Cleveland's rookie-level affiliate. On July 2, 2026, League was announced as the pitching coach for the National League at the All-Star Futures Game.

== Pitching style ==
League's main pitch is a very hard sinker averaging 96 mph. (In 2011, he had the hardest sinker of any relief pitcher, at 97.3 mph.) He also has an upper-80s slider that he uses primarily early in the count to right-handed hitters. He also has a splitter that he uses as a strikeout pitch. The splitter has a whiff rate of 55%.

== Personal life ==
League resides in Honolulu, and is hapa Yonsei. His maternal great-grandparents were born and raised in Fukuoka prefecture on Kyushu Island in Japan.

League's wife, Sasha League, attended Mt. Carmel High School in San Diego, California. She holds a psychology major from the University of Hawaii. They have been married since 2005. Brandon and Sasha League have four daughters.

After his playing career, League founded Parallel X League, a Southern California-based clothing line, in 2019.

Preceded by Johan Santana	No-hit game June 8, 2012 (with Millwood, Furbush, Pryor, Luetge, & Wilhelmsen)	Succeeded by Matt Cain
