= Stephen Pryor =

American baseball player (born 1989)

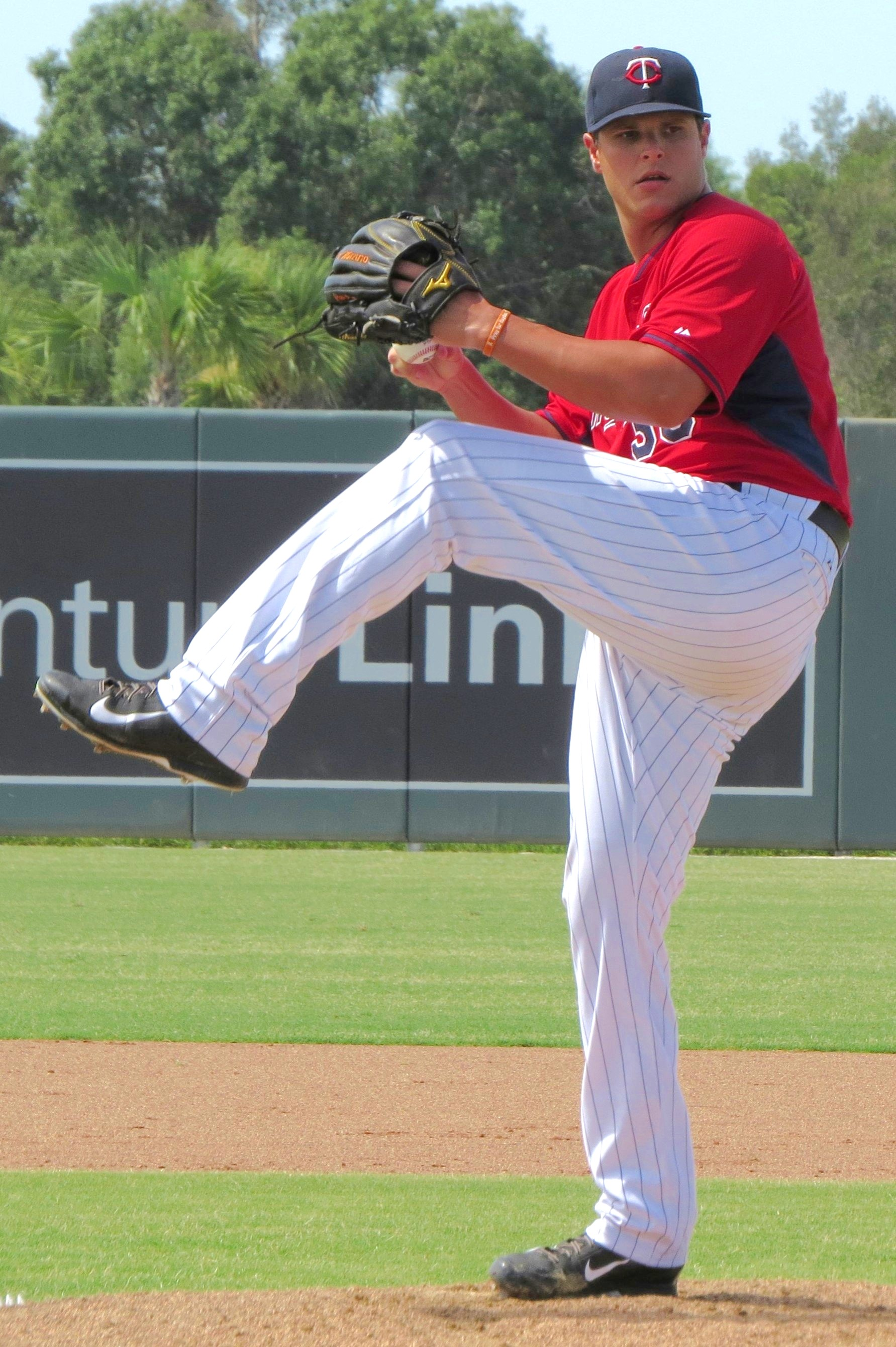
- Pryor pitching for the GCL Twins in 2015
- Pitcher
- Born: July 23, 1989 (age 36); Donelson, Tennessee, U.S.
- Batted: Right Threw: Right

MLB debut
- June 2, 2012, for the Seattle Mariners

Last appearance
- July 9, 2014, for the Seattle Mariners

MLB statistics
- Win–loss record: 3–1
- Earned run average: 2.81
- Strikeouts: 35
- Stats at Baseball Reference

Teams
- Seattle Mariners (2012–2014)

Career highlights and awards
- Pitched a combined no-hitter on June 8, 2012

Stephen Michael Pryor (born July 23, 1989) is an American former professional baseball pitcher who played in Major League Baseball (MLB) for three seasons with the Seattle Mariners. Pryor made his MLB debut on June 2, 2012. Six days later, he won his first game in a combined no-hitter started by Kevin Millwood.

== Amateur career ==
Pryor attended Friendship Christian School in Lebanon, Tennessee, where he pitched for the school's baseball team. Undrafted out of high school, Pryor began his college baseball career at Cleveland State Community College in 2007. The Texas Rangers drafted Pryor in the 42nd round of the 2008 Major League Baseball draft, but he did not sign. After playing at Cleveland State for two seasons, Pryor transferred to Tennessee Technological University, where he played for the Tennessee Tech Golden Eagles as their closer. Pryor pitched to a 4–4 win–loss record with a 5.71 earned run average, 22 walks, and 75 strikeouts in 24 appearances for the Golden Eagles in 2010.

== Professional career ==
=== Seattle Mariners ===
The Seattle Mariners drafted Pryor in the fifth round (162nd overall) of the 2010 Major League Baseball draft, and he signed with them. He began his professional career with the Everett AquaSox of the Low-A Northwest League that year.

Pryor advanced to the Clinton LumberKings of the Single-A Midwest League in August 2010. He pitched for the High Desert Mavericks of the High-A California League and Jackson Generals of the Double-A Southern League in 2011.

MLB.com ranked Pryor as the ninth-best Mariners' prospect prior to the 2012 season. He started the year with Jackson, before receiving a promotion to the Tacoma Rainiers of the Triple-A Pacific Coast League in May. Pryor was promoted to the majors for the first time on May 31, 2012. He made his MLB debut two days later against the Chicago White Sox. Pryor recorded his first MLB win on June 8, as part of a combined no-hitter against the Los Angeles Dodgers in a game started by Kevin Millwood. The game was only his fourth MLB appearance. Charlie Furbush, Brandon League, Lucas Luetge, and Tom Wilhelmsen also appeared in the game for Seattle. Pryor made 26 appearances for the Mariners during his rookie campaign, compiling a 3-1 record and 3.91 ERA with 27 strikeouts over 23 innings of work.

In April 2013, Pryor was placed on the 60-day disabled list for a torn right latissimus dorsi muscle, and on July 16, he served as a starting pitcher for the Everett AquaSox against the Vancouver Canadians. On August 11, Pryor underwent surgery to repair a torn tricep, ending his season. Prior to the injury, he had recorded seven scoreless appearances for Seattle, with seven strikeouts in 7 1/3 innings.

Pryor made one appearance for Seattle during the 2014 season, tossing a 1 2/3 innings against the Minnesota Twins on July 9, 2014.

=== Minnesota Twins ===
On July 24, 2014, Pryor was traded to the Minnesota Twins in exchange for Kendrys Morales. He made 14 appearances down the stretch for the Triple-A Rochester Red Wings, recording a 1-0 record and 0.89 ERA with 22 strikeouts and two saves across 20 1/3 innings pitched.

On March 29, 2015, Pryor was removed from the 40-man roster and sent outright to Rochester. On May 13, Pryor underwent surgery to repair a torn meniscus. He made 15 appearances split between Rochester and the rookie-level Gulf Coast League Twins during the year, accumulating a 1-2 record and 5.96 ERA with 26 strikeouts across 22 2/3 innings pitched. Pryor was released by the Twins organization on December 17.

Preceded by Johan Santana	No-hit game June 8, 2012 (with Millwood, Furbush, Luetge, League, & Wilhelmsen)	Succeeded by Matt Cain
