= Kevin Millwood =

American baseball player (born 1974)

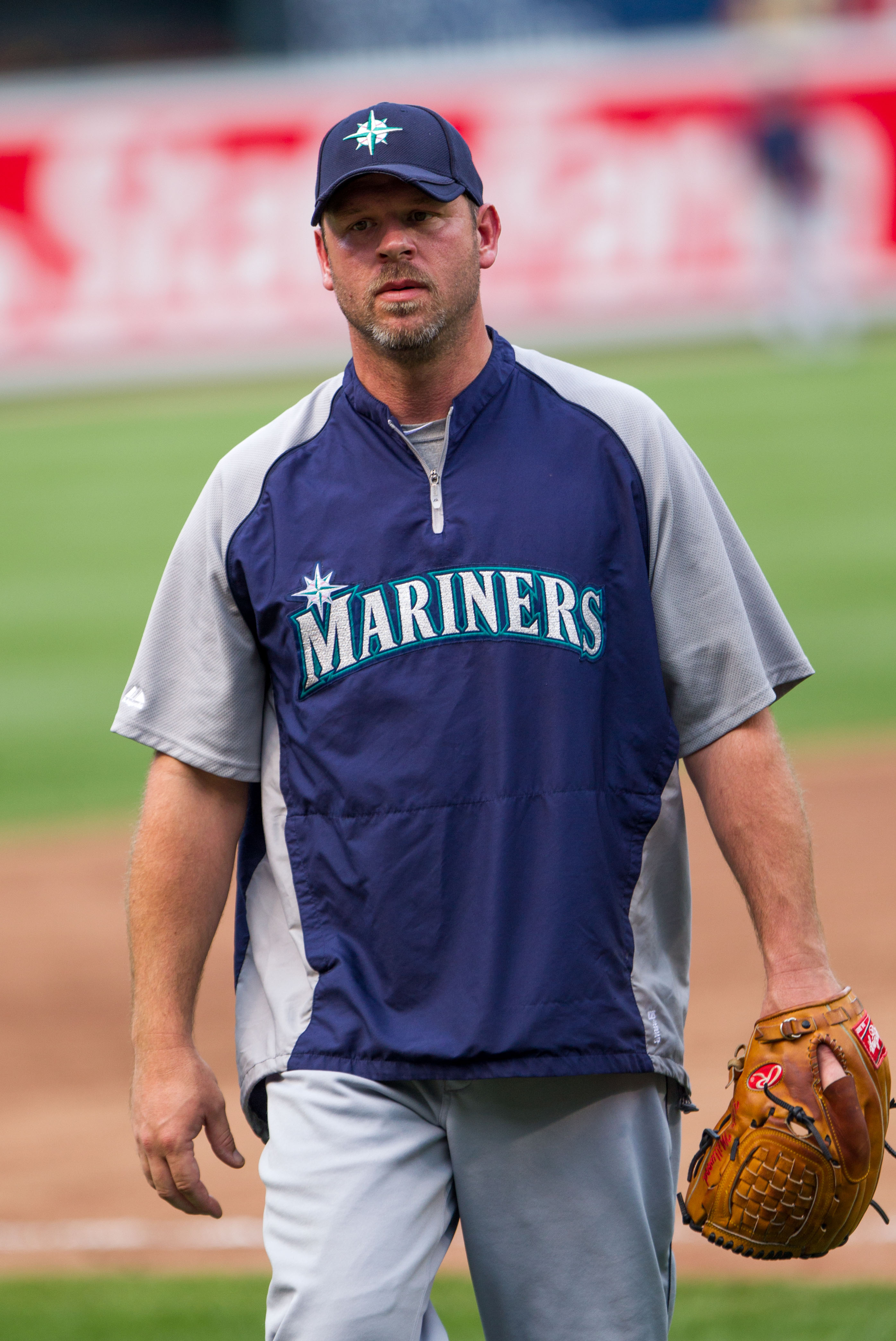
- Millwood with the Seattle Mariners in 2012
- Pitcher
- Born: December 24, 1974 (age 51); Gastonia, North Carolina, U.S.
- Batted: Right Threw: Right

MLB debut
- July 14, 1997, for the Atlanta Braves

Last MLB appearance
- September 12, 2012, for the Seattle Mariners

MLB statistics
- Win–loss record: 169–152
- Earned run average: 4.11
- Strikeouts: 2,083
- Stats at Baseball Reference

Teams
- Atlanta Braves (1997–2002); Philadelphia Phillies (2003–2004); Cleveland Indians (2005); Texas Rangers (2006–2009); Baltimore Orioles (2010); Colorado Rockies (2011); Seattle Mariners (2012)

Career highlights and awards
- All-Star (1999); AL ERA leader (2005); Pitched a no-hitter on April 27, 2003; Pitched a combined no-hitter on June 8, 2012

Kevin Austin Millwood (born December 24, 1974) is an American former professional baseball pitcher. He played in Major League Baseball (MLB) for the Atlanta Braves, Philadelphia Phillies, Cleveland Indians, Texas Rangers, Baltimore Orioles, Colorado Rockies and Seattle Mariners.

While with the Braves, Millwood was part of a pitching rotation which featured Greg Maddux, Tom Glavine and John Smoltz. In 1999 he was selected to his only All-Star Game and helped lead the Braves to the 1999 World Series and two seasons later the 2001 National League Championship Series. As a member of the Indians, his 2.86 ERA led all American League pitchers. In 2012, Millwood became the 67th pitcher to record 2,000 career strikeouts.

== Early life ==
Millwood was raised by Kathy Coplen and Bill Millwood in Bessemer City, North Carolina. He attended Bessemer City High School where he played baseball, basketball and football. As a basketball player, he scored 1,000 points for the Bessemer City Yellow Jackets. Milwood missed the beginning of every high school baseball season in order to finish the basketball season and did not expect to be drafted by a professional baseball team out of high school.

== Baseball career ==
=== Atlanta Braves ===
Millwood was drafted by the Atlanta Braves in the 11th round of the 1993 MLB draft. After four years in the minors, Millwood made his debut with the Atlanta Braves on July 14, 1997. A year later, he won 17 games. Millwood formed a part of the Braves' star pitching rotation, which also consisted of Greg Maddux, John Smoltz and Tom Glavine. According to Nate Silver, the 1997 Braves starting rotation was the best in the history of baseball as of the 2010 season.

In 1999, Millwood posted career-highs in wins (18, also achieved in 2002), earned run average (2.68), strikeouts (205) and WHIP (0.996). He finished third in the National League Cy Young Award voting (losing to the Arizona Diamondbacks' Randy Johnson) and 26th on the National League MVP ballot. He was selected as an All-Star in 1999, his only appearance in the Midsummer Classic.

=== Philadelphia Phillies ===
Before the 2003 season, Millwood was traded by the Braves to the Philadelphia Phillies for catcher Johnny Estrada in order to cut their payroll in the midst of economic difficulties. He went 14–12 with his new team, including throwing a no-hitter against the San Francisco Giants on April 27 coming in the Phillies' final season at Veterans Stadium (this was one of only two no-hitters ever thrown at the now-demolished stadium, both coming against the San Francisco Giants). He also led the majors in stolen bases allowed, with 41.

=== Cleveland Indians ===
In 2005, Millwood signed a one-year contract as a free agent with the Cleveland Indians. He came back from injury well, leading the American League in ERA (2.86). However, he managed a record of only 9–11, due to poor run support. In 2005, Millwood again led the majors in stolen bases allowed, with 33. He finished tied for sixth in balloting for the AL Cy Young Award.

=== Texas Rangers ===
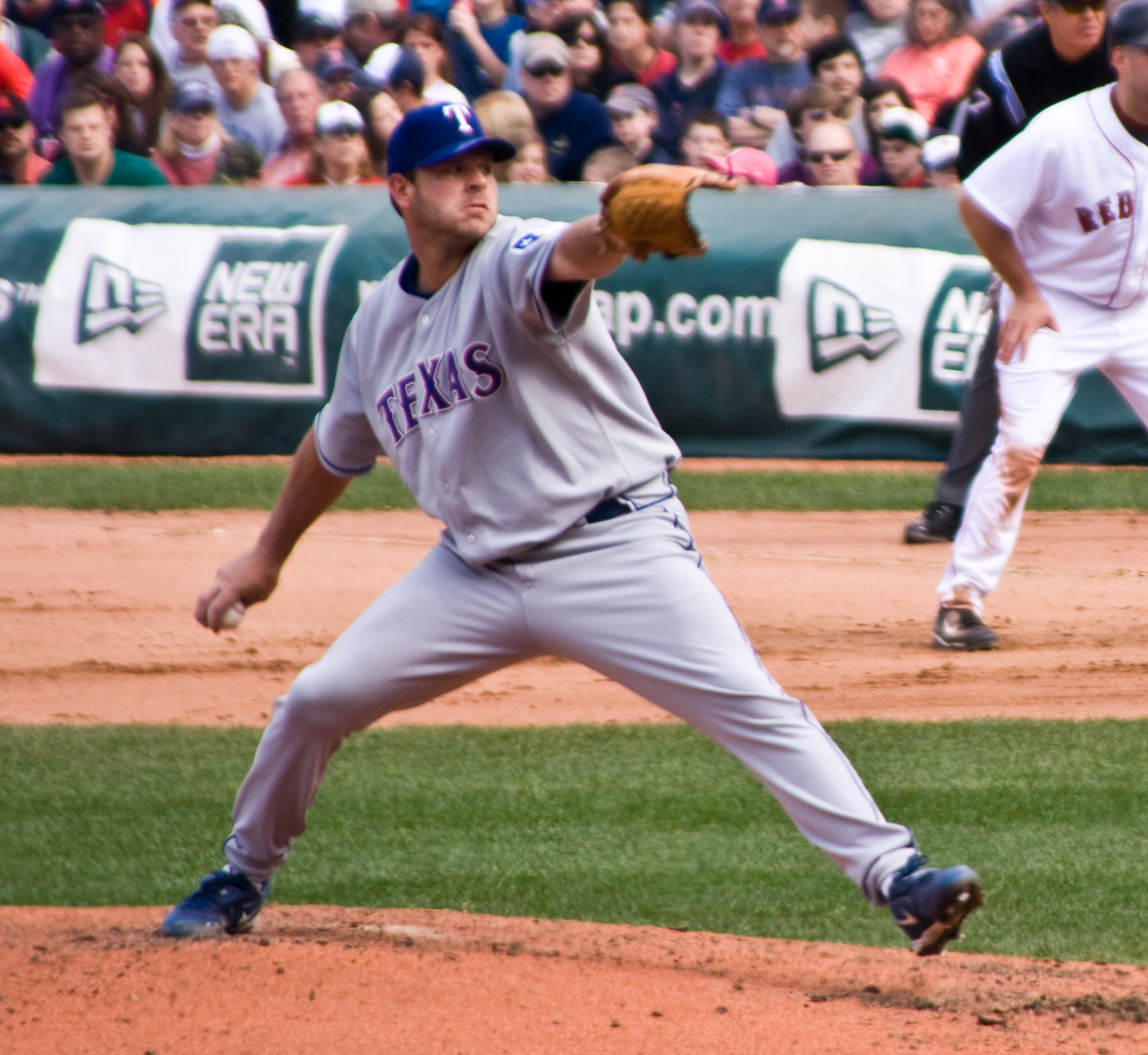
Millwood pitching for the Texas Rangers in 2008.

On December 26, 2005, the Texas Rangers signed Millwood to a five-year, $60 million deal.

In 2006, he and Vicente Padilla won 15 games; a total not matched by a Rangers pitcher until Scott Feldman in 2009.

In 2008, when batters did hit the ball against him, it was with uncommon success, as his .358 batting-average-against on balls in play was the highest in the major leagues. 26% of all balls put in play against him were line drives, the highest percentage in the majors.

=== Baltimore Orioles ===
Millwood was traded to the Baltimore Orioles on December 9, 2009, for Chris Ray and a player to be named later (left-handed pitcher Ben Snyder, a Rule 5 pick from San Francisco).

During the 2010 season, Millwood went 4–16 with a 5.10 earned run average, leading the league in losses.

=== New York Yankees ===
On March 25, 2011, Millwood was signed to a minor league contract by the New York Yankees. After making three starts in the minor leagues, he opted out of his contract on May 1.

=== Boston Red Sox ===
Millwood signed a minor league contract with the Boston Red Sox on May 19, 2011. He was released on August 7, exercising an opt-out clause.

=== Colorado Rockies ===
On August 8, 2011, Millwood signed a minor league contract with the Colorado Rockies. Millwood was called up August 10 to fill a void after an injury to Juan Nicasio.

=== Seattle Mariners ===
On January 22, 2012, it was reported that the Seattle Mariners had signed Millwood to a minor league contract. He was called up from Triple-A and made his first major league start of the season on April 22 against the Chicago White Sox. On May 13, Millwood became the 67th pitcher to record 2,000 career strikeouts when he struck out Yankee Curtis Granderson. Millwood notched a win over Yankee starter Andy Pettitte, who was pitching in the majors for the first time since 2010.

On June 8, Millwood pitched the first six innings of a combined no-hitter against the Los Angeles Dodgers before leaving the game due to a groin injury. Charlie Furbush, Stephen Pryor, Lucas Luetge, Brandon League, and Tom Wilhelmsen helped him complete the bid. Millwood was put on the disabled list in September with soreness in his shoulder and missed the remainder of the regular season.

=== Retirement ===
On February 3, 2013, Millwood was reported to be retiring.

== Pitching style ==
Millwood was a sinkerball pitcher. His sinker clocked at 89–92 mph and was complemented mostly by an 89–91 mph cutter and 83–86 mph slider. Millwood also threw a curveball (71–74) and a changeup (82–84) that he used against left-handed hitters. He tended to use the cutter early in the count, with higher use of his breaking balls in two-strike situations.

== Personal life ==
On January 9, 1999, in Spartanburg, South Carolina, Millwood married Rena Stevens of Greenville, South Carolina.

== See also ==
- List of Major League Baseball annual ERA leaders
- List of Major League Baseball no-hitters
- List of Texas Rangers Opening Day starting pitchers
- List of Major League Baseball career strikeout leaders

Awards and achievements
Preceded by Robert Person	Philadelphia Phillies Opening Day Starting Pitcher; 2003–2004	Succeeded by Jon Lieber
Preceded by Derek Lowe	No-hitter pitcher April 27, 2003	Succeeded by Roy Oswalt, Pete Munro, Kirk Saarloos, Octavio Dotel, & Billy Wagner
Preceded by Johan Santana	No-hit game June 8, 2012 (with Furbush, Pryor, Luetge, League, & Wilhelmsen)	Succeeded by Matt Cain
Preceded by Kerry Wood	Fewest hits per nine innings (NL); 1999	Succeeded by Chan Ho Park
