= Tom Wilhelmsen (baseball) =

American baseball player (born 1983)

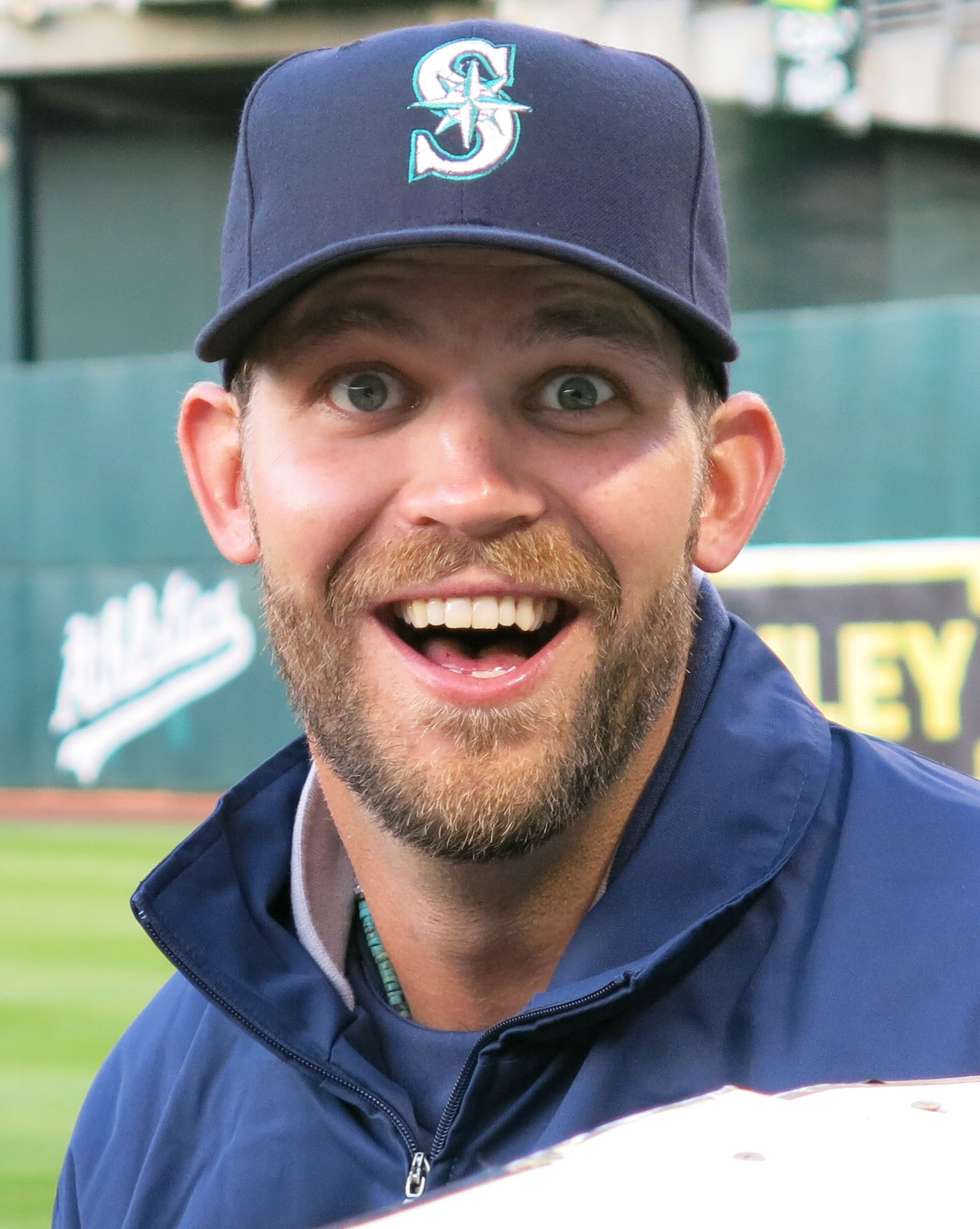
- Wilhelmsen with the Seattle Mariners
- Pitcher
- Born: December 16, 1983 (age 42); Tucson, Arizona, U.S.
- Batted: Right Threw: Right

MLB debut
- April 3, 2011, for the Seattle Mariners

Last MLB appearance
- June 9, 2017, for the Arizona Diamondbacks

MLB statistics
- Win–loss record: 14–15
- Earned run average: 3.53
- Strikeouts: 339
- Saves: 68
- Stats at Baseball Reference

Teams
- Seattle Mariners (2011–2015); Texas Rangers (2016); Seattle Mariners (2016); Arizona Diamondbacks (2017)

Career highlights and awards
- Pitched a combined no-hitter on June 8, 2012

Thomas Mark Wilhelmsen (born December 16, 1983) is an American former professional baseball relief pitcher. He played in Major League Baseball (MLB) for the Seattle Mariners, Texas Rangers, and Arizona Diamondbacks.

== Career ==
=== Milwaukee Brewers ===
Wilhelmsen graduated from Tucson High School, whence he was selected by the Milwaukee Brewers in the seventh round (199th overall) of the 2002 Major League Baseball draft. Later that summer, upon signing with the Brewers on August 19, he received a US$250,000 bonus. He began his professional career the next season.

Wilhelmsen played for the Arizona League Brewers and Beloit Snappers in 2003, going a combined 5–6 with a 2.84 ERA in 17 starts. Following that season, he twice tested positive for marijuana and was suspended for the 2004 campaign. He decided to quit professional baseball during extended spring training after his suspension ended in 2005.

During his five-year hiatus from 2005 to 2009, he worked as a bartender at The Hut, a tiki bar in his hometown. This occupation would later be the inspiration for his nickname.

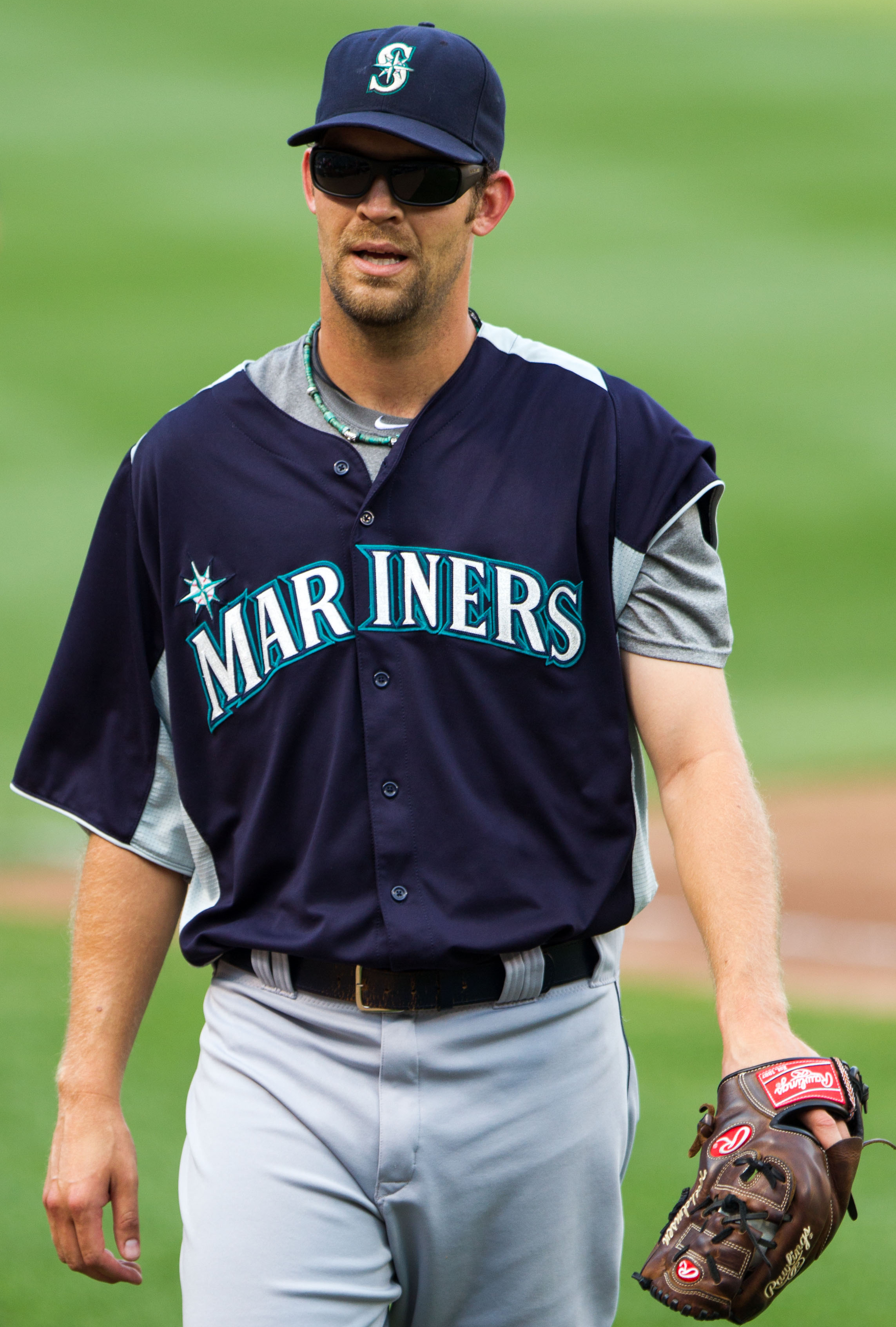
Tom Wilhelmsen in 2012.

=== Seattle Mariners ===
Prior to the 2010 season, Wilhelmsen attempted a comeback and signed a minor league contract with the Mariners. He played for the AZL Mariners, Everett AquaSox and Clinton LumberKings that season, going a combined 7–1 with a 2.19 ERA in 15 games (12 starts).

On May 17, 2011, after being signed by the Mariners he was optioned to Class AA in order to clear room for Franklin Gutierrez to be activated. After a series of trades created an opening on the Mariners' 25-man roster, Wilhelmsen was recalled from the minor leagues on August 2, 2011. He won his first major league game on August 15, pitching a perfect 8th inning against the Toronto Blue Jays.

On June 8, 2012, Wilhelmsen recorded the save in a six-pitcher combined no-hitter which was started by Kevin Millwood who left the game after the 6th inning due to a groin injury. The six pitchers used by the Mariners tied the record of most pitchers used in a no-hitter with the 2003 Houston Astros. The Mariners beat the Los Angeles Dodgers 1–0. Wilhelmsen said after the game that while he was pitching, he had forgotten it was a no-hitter, and only remembered after catcher Jesús Montero reminded him.

Wilhelmsen was optioned to Tacoma on August 6, 2013, and recalled in September. In 2014 Wilhelmsen was back in the Mariner bullpen, appearing in 57 games and finishing the season with a 2.27 ERA and a WHIP of 1.05. It was also in 2014 that Wilhelmsen reached a wider audience in baseball after his formidable dancing ability was captured on video.

During the 2015 season, Wilhelmsen had a brief stint on the disabled list after a bullpen accident; Wilhelmsen was swinging his arms when teammate Danny Farquhar ran into Wilhelmsen's right arm, resulting in a hyperextended elbow.

=== Texas Rangers ===
On November 16, 2015, the Mariners traded Wilhelmsen, James Jones, and a player to be named later (Patrick Kivlehan) to the Texas Rangers for Leonys Martín and Anthony Bass. On January 13, 2016, the Rangers and Wilhelmsen agreed to a one-year, $3.1 million contract to avoid arbitration. Wilhelmsen had a rough start with the Rangers with an ERA of 10.55. With this, the Rangers optioned Wilhelmsen to the Triple-A Round Rock Express, but he refused, making him a free agent.

=== Seattle Mariners (second stint) ===
On June 22, 2016, Wilhelmsen signed a one-year contract with the Seattle Mariners. He was designated for assignment by the Mariners on November 18, and released on November 22.

=== Arizona Diamondbacks ===
On February 10, 2017, Wilhelmsen signed a minor league contract with the Arizona Diamondbacks. He made the Diamondbacks' Opening Day roster. He was designated for assignment on June 11. He was released on June 16, 2017, after struggling with his command, allowing 12 walks in 26 innings and posting a 4.44 ERA for the Diamondbacks.

=== Milwaukee Brewers ===
On June 22, 2017, Wilhelmsen signed a minor league contract with the Milwaukee Brewers. He was released on August 5.

=== San Diego Padres ===
On February 5, 2018, Wilhelmsen signed a minor league contract with the San Diego Padres. He was released on March 19.

=== St. Paul Saints ===
On May 2, 2018, Wilhelmsen signed with the St. Paul Saints of the independent American Association of Independent Professional Baseball. He made 18 appearances for the Saints, compiling an 0-1 record and 2.89 ERA with 14 strikeouts and seven saves over 18 2/3 innings of relief.

=== Toros de Tijuana ===
On July 3, 2018, Wilhelmsen signed with the Toros de Tijuana of the Mexican League. He made 15 appearances (13 games finished) for the Toros, he compiled an 0-1 record and 3.86 ERA with 11 strikeouts and eight saves across 14 innings of relief. Wilhelmsen was released by Tijuana on August 18.

Wilhelmsen announced his retirement on December 10, 2018.

== Pitch mechanics ==
Wilhelmsen mainly throws two pitches — a four-seam fastball, which is usually 95-98 mph, and a 12-6 curveball, which will be in the upper 70s with a big, 12-6 break. He has experimented with a slider and circle changeup, but he uses these pitches sparingly. However, the changeup was seen more frequently during Spring Training in 2013.

Preceded by Johan Santana	No-hit game June 8, 2012 (with Millwood, Furbush, Pryor, Luetge, & League)	Succeeded by Matt Cain
