= 2011 Seattle Mariners season =

2011 Seattle Mariners
- League: American League
- Division: West
- Ballpark: Safeco Field
- City: Seattle, Washington
- Record: 67–95 (.414)
- Divisional place: 4th
- Owners: Nintendo of America and Satoru Iwata (represented by Howard Lincoln)
- General manager: Jack Zduriencik
- Manager: Eric Wedge
- Television: Root Sports Northwest (Dave Sims, Mike Blowers, Dan Wilson, Jay Buhner, Rick Rizzs, Ken Wilson), Jen Mueller and Angie Mentink
- Radio: ESPN-710; Seattle Mariners Radio Network (Rick Rizzs, Ron Fairly, Ken Levine, Ken Wilson, Dave Valle, Dave Henderson)

The 2011 Seattle Mariners season was the 35th season in franchise history. The Mariners finished the season last in the American League West with a 67–95 (.414) record.

Eric Wedge was hired before the season to manage the Mariners.

Long-time broadcaster Dave Niehaus died before the season. The team wore commemorative patches honoring Niehaus during the season and unveiled a statue of Niehaus at Safeco Field in September.

The Mariners established the King's Court fan section for ace Félix Hernández during the season.

== Off-season ==
=== Coaching changes ===
Daren Brown, the Seattle Mariners interim manager during the 2010 season, stated that he had interest in returning as the full-time manager in 2011. On October 5, 2010, The Seattle Times reported that Mariners had requested and received permission from the Kansas City Royals to interview their bench coach John Gibbons, who previously served as the Toronto Blue Jays manager. The Seattle Times also reported that the Mariners interviewed Bobby Valentine and Lloyd McClendon for the open managerial position. On October 15, Eric Wedge was hired as the manager.

=== Death of Dave Niehaus ===
Long-time broadcaster Dave Niehaus suffered a myocardial infarction at his Bellevue, Washington, home while preparing to barbecue some ribs on his deck on November 10, 2010 and died at age 75. Heart problems had forced Niehaus to undergo two angioplasties in 1996, leading him to give up smoking and change his diet. He was survived by his wife, three children, and six grandchildren.

On December 22, Seattle rapper Macklemore released a song called "My Oh My" in tribute to Niehaus. Macklemore performed the song at Safeco Field on Opening Day 2011 during the team's tribute to the late broadcaster.

The team wore patches on their jerseys in commemoration of Niehaus during the 2011 season. A bronze statue of Niehaus was unveiled on September 16 at Safeco Field.

=== Notable transactions ===
- December 2, 2010: Érik Bédard re-signed with the Mariners.
- December 2: José López traded to the Colorado Rockies for Chaz Roe.
- December 10: Jack Cust signed as a free agent.
- December 12: Brendan Ryan acquired from the St. Louis Cardinals for Maikel Cleto.
- December 14: Ryan Langerhans and Chris Gimenez signed as free agents.
- January 3, 2011: Miguel Olivo signeda two-year, $7 million contract as a free agent.
- January 4: Josh Bard signed as a free agent.
- January 10: Adam Kennedy signed a minor-league contract as a free agent.
- January 31: Jamey Wright re-signed with the Mariners on a minor-league contract.
- March 2: Aaron Laffey acquired from the Cleveland Indians for Matt Lawson.

== Regular season ==
=== Season standings ===
==== American League West ====
AL West
Team	W	L	Pct.	GB	Home	Road
Texas Rangers	96	66	.593	—	52‍–‍29	44‍–‍37
Los Angeles Angels of Anaheim	86	76	.531	10	45‍–‍36	41‍–‍40
Oakland Athletics	74	88	.457	22	43‍–‍38	31‍–‍50
Seattle Mariners	67	95	.414	29	39‍–‍45	28‍–‍50

==== American League Wild Card ====
Division winners
Team	W	L	Pct.
New York Yankees	97	65	.599
Texas Rangers	96	66	.593
Detroit Tigers	95	67	.586

Wild Card team (Top team qualifies for postseason)
Team	W	L	Pct.	GB
Tampa Bay Rays	91	71	.562	—
Boston Red Sox	90	72	.556	1
Los Angeles Angels of Anaheim	86	76	.531	5
Toronto Blue Jays	81	81	.500	10
Cleveland Indians	80	82	.494	11
Chicago White Sox	79	83	.488	12
Oakland Athletics	74	88	.457	17
Kansas City Royals	71	91	.438	20
Baltimore Orioles	69	93	.426	22
Seattle Mariners	67	95	.414	24
Minnesota Twins	63	99	.389	28

==== Record against opponents ====
2011 American League record Source: MLB Standings Grid – 2011
Team	BAL	BOS	CWS	CLE	DET	KC	LAA	MIN	NYY	OAK	SEA	TB	TEX	TOR	NL
Baltimore	–	8–10	4–4	2–5	5–5	5–4	3–6	6–2	5–13	4–5	4–2	9–9	1–5	6–12	7–11
Boston	10–8	–	2–4	4–6	5–1	5–3	6–2	5–2	12–6	6–2	5–4	6–12	4–6	10–8	10–8
Chicago	4–4	4–2	–	11–7	5–13	7–11	2–6	9–9	2–6	6–4	7–2	4–4	4–4	3–4	11–7
Cleveland	5–2	6–4	7–11	–	6–12	12–6	3–6	11–7	3–4	5–2	5–4	2–4	1–9	3–4	11–7
Detroit	5–5	1–5	13–5	12–6	–	11–7	3–4	14–4	4–3	5–5	4–6	6–1	6–3	4–2	7–11
Kansas City	4–5	3–5	11–7	6–12	7–11	–	7–3	8–10	3–3	4–5	5–3	2–5	2–6	4–3	5–13
Los Angeles	6–3	2–6	6–2	6–3	4–3	3–7	–	6–3	4–5	8–11	12–7	4–4	7–12	5–5	13–5
Minnesota	2–6	2–5	9–9	7–11	4–14	10–8	3–6	–	2–6	4–4	3–5	3–7	5–3	1–5	8–10
New York	13–5	6–12	6–2	4–3	3–4	3–3	5–4	6–2	–	6–3	5–4	9–9	7–2	11–7	13–5
Oakland	5–4	2–6	4–6	2–5	5–5	5–4	11–8	4–4	3–6	–	9–10	5–2	6–13	5–5	8–10
Seattle	2–4	4–5	2–7	4–5	6–4	3–5	7–12	5–3	4–5	10–9	–	4–6	4–15	3–6	9–9
Tampa Bay	9–9	12–6	4–4	4–2	1–6	5–2	4–4	7–3	9–9	2–5	6–4	–	4–5	12–6	12–6
Texas	5–1	6–4	4–4	9–1	3–6	6–2	12–7	3–5	2–7	13–6	15–4	5–4	–	4–6	9–9
Toronto	12–6	8–10	4–3	4–3	2–4	3–4	5–5	5–1	7–11	5–5	6–3	6–12	6–4	–	8–10

- Source: MLB Standings Grid – 2011

=== Season summary ===
After winning their first two games of the season, the Mariners lost seven games in a row, entering last place in the American League (AL) West. The team returned to .500 in late May, spending much of the next month in second place. A 17-game losing streak in July returned the team to the basement and led the team to trade starters Doug Fister and Érik Bédard at the trade deadline.

Pitchers Félix Hernández, Michael Pineda, and Brandon League represented the Mariners in the All-Star Game. The Mariners created the King's Court fan section during Hernández's starts during the season. Ichiro Suzuki's streak of appearing in the All-Star Game and winning a Gold Glove Award, which started in his rookie season in 2001, ended.

Pineda, Dustin Ackley, and Mike Carp were named to the Baseball America All-Rookie Team. Pineda was the AL Rookie of the Month in April, with Carp winning the award in August.

==== Notable transactions ====
- April 30, 2011: Steve Delabar signed as a minor league free agent.
- May 3: Roenis Elías signed as a minor league free agent.
- May 16: Milton Bradley released.
- June 6: Start of 2011 MLB draft. Notable signings include:
  - Danny Hultzen selected with the second overall pick of the draft. He signed for a $6.35 million signing bonus.
  - Brad Miller selected in the second round. He signed for a $750,000 bonus
  - Carter Capps selected in the third round as a supplemental pick.
  - John Hicks selected in the fourth round.
  - Carson Smith selected in the eighth round.
- July 27: Wily Mo Peña signed as a free agent.
- July 29: Ryan Langerhans traded to the Arizona Diamondbacks for cash.
- July 30: Doug Fister and David Pauley traded to the Detroit Tigers for Casper Wells, Charlie Furbush, Francisco Martinez, and a player to be named later. Seattle received Chance Ruffin on August 17 to complete the trade.
- July 31: Érik Bédard and Josh Fields traded to the Boston Red Sox. Seattle received Trayvon Robinson from the Los Angeles Dodgers and Chih Hsien Chiang from the Red Sox.
- August 4: Jack Cust released.
- August 19: Aaron Laffey selected off waivers by the New York Yankees.
- August 21: Andrew Kittredge signed a minor league contract.
- August 31: Jack Wilson traded to the Atlanta Braves for a player to be named later. Seattle received Luis Caballero on September 30 to complete the trade.
- September 1: Matt Tuiasosopo released.

=== Game log ===
Legend
	Mariners win
	Mariners loss
	Postponement
**Bold**	Mariners team member

2011 Game Log: 67–95
April: 13–15 (Home: 5–8; Road: 8–7)

#	Date	Opponent	Score	Win	Loss	Save	Attendance	Record	Boxscore
1	April 1	@ Athletics	6–2	**Hernández** (1–0)	Breslow (0–1)		36,067	1–0	
2	April 2	@ Athletics	5–2	**Ray** (1–0)	Fuentes (0–1)	**League** (1)	15,088	2–0	
3	April 3	@ Athletics	1–7	Gonzalez (1–0)	**Fister** (0–1)		22,292	2–1	
4	April 4	@ Rangers	4–6	Holland (1–0)	**Bédard** (0–1)	Feliz (1)	37,618	2–2	
5	April 5	@ Rangers	2–3	Ogando (1–0)	**Pineda** (0–1)	Feliz (2)	30,953	2–3	
6	April 6	@ Rangers	3–7	Wilson (1–0)	**Hernández** (1–1)		25,049	2–4	
7	April 8	Indians	3–12	Carrasco (1–1)	**Vargas** (0–1)		45,727	2–5	
8	April 9	Indians	1–2	Masterson (2–0)	**Fister** (0–2)	Perez (3)	30,309	2–6	
9	April 10	Indians	4–6	Tomlin (2–0)	**Bédard** (0–2)	Perez (4)	21,128	2–7	
10	April 11	Blue Jays	8–7	**Lueke** (1–0)	Camp (0–1)		13,056	3–7	
11	April 12	Blue Jays	3–2	**Pineda** (1–1)	Romero (1–1)	**League** (2)	15,500	4–7	
12	April 13	Blue Jays	3–8	Rzepczynski (1–0)	**Ray** (1–1)		12,407	4–8	
13	April 14	@ Royals	1–5 (8)	Chen (2–0)	**Fister** (0–3)		8,811	4–9	
14	April 15	@ Royals	5–6	Hochevar (2–1)	**Bédard** (0–3)	Soria (4)	13,686	4–10	
15	April 16	@ Royals	0–7	O'Sullivan (1–1)	**Hernández** (1–2)		22,364	4–11	
16	April 17	@ Royals	3–2	**Pineda** (2–1)	Francis (0–1)	**League** (3)	19,424	5–11	
17	April 18	Tigers	3–8	Scherzer (3–0)	**Lueke** (1–1)		12,774	5–12	
18	April 19	Tigers	13–3	**Fister** (1–3)	Coke (1–3)		12,411	6–12	
19	April 20	Tigers	2–3	Porcello (1–2)	**Bédard** (0–4)	Valverde (4)	13,339	6–13	
20	April 21	Athletics	1–0	**Hernández** (2–2)	McCarthy (1–1)	**League** (4)	12,770	7–13	
21	April 22	Athletics	4–0	**Pineda** (3–1)	Ross (1–2)	**League** (5)	17,798	8–13	
22	April 23	Athletics	1–9	Cahill (3–0)	**Vargas** (0–2)		25,355	8–14	
23	April 24	Athletics	2–5	Anderson (2–1)	**Laffey** (0–1)	Fuentes (6)	16,530	8–15	
24	April 26	@ Tigers	7–3	**Hernández** (3–2)	Coke (1–4)		18,027	9–15	
25	April 27	@ Tigers	10–1	**Bédard** (1–4)	Verlander (2–3)		18,153	10–15	
26	April 28	@ Tigers	7–2	**Pineda** (4–1)	Penny (1–3)		21,176	11–15	
27	April 29	@ Red Sox	5–4	**Vargas** (1–2)	Jenks (1–2)	**League** (6)	37,845	12–15	
28	April 30	@ Red Sox	2–0	**Fister** (2–3)	Lackey (2–3)	**League** (7)	37,901	13–15	

May: 15–11 (Home: 10–5; Road: 5–6)

#	Date	Opponent	Score	Win	Loss	Save	Attendance	Record	Boxscore
29	May 1	@ Red Sox	2–3	Papelbon (1–0)	**Wright** (0–1)		37,079	13–16	
30	May 3	Rangers	4–3	**Pauley** (1–0)	Strop (0–1)	**League** (8)	12,759	14–16	
31	May 4	Rangers	2–5	Wilson (4–1)	**Pineda** (4–2)		13,896	14–17	
32	May 5	Rangers	3–1	**Vargas** (2–2)	Lewis (2–4)	**League** (9)	14,205	15–17	
33	May 6	White Sox	3–2	**Hernández** (4–2)	Thornton (0–3)		31,912	16–17	
34	May 7	White Sox	0–6	Floyd (4–2)	**Fister** (2–4)		26,288	16–18	
35	May 8	White Sox	2–5 (10)	Santos (1–0)	**League** (0–1)		26,074	16–19	
36	May 10	@ Orioles	6–7 (13)	Accardo (2–0)	**League** (0–2)		11,485	16–20	
37	May 11	@ Orioles	2–4	Tillman (2–3)	**Hernández** (4–3)	Gregg (7)	11,561	16–21	
38	May 12	@ Orioles	1–2 (12)	Johnson (2–1)	**League** (0–3)		19,082	16–22	
39	May 13	@ Indians	4–5	Sipp (2–0)	**League** (0–4)		33,774	16–23	
–	May 14	@ Indians	Postponed (rain); Makeup: August 23 (Game 1)						
–	May 15	@ Indians	Postponed (rain); Makeup: September 19						
40	May 16	Twins	5–2	**Pineda** (5–2)	Baker (2–3)		14,859	17–23	
41	May 17	Twins	1–2	Liriano (3–5)	**Hernández** (4–4)	Capps (6)	16,015	17–24	
42	May 18	Angels	3–0	**Vargas** (3–2)	Weaver (6–4)	**League** (10)	16,992	18–24	
43	May 19	Angels	2–1	**Pauley** (2–0)	Downs (1–1)		18,374	19–24	
44	May 20	@ Padres	4–1	**Bédard** (2–4)	Latos (1–6)		26,501	20–24	
45	May 21	@ Padres	4–0	**Pineda** (6–2)	Richard (2–5)		34,648	21–24	
46	May 22	@ Padres	6–1	**Hernández** (5–4)	Stauffer (0–3)		34,705	22–24	
47	May 23	@ Twins	8–7 (10)	**Wright** (1–1)	Swarzak (0–2)	**League** (11)	37,498	23–24	
48	May 24	@ Twins	2–4	Blackburn (4–4)	**Fister** (2–5)		37,691	23–25	
49	May 25	@ Twins	3–0	**Bédard** (3–4)	Duensing (2–5)	**League** (12)	38,860	24–25	
50	May 27	Yankees	4–3	**Pauley** (3–0)	Ayala (1–1)	**League** (13)	33,715	25–25	
51	May 28	Yankees	5–4 (12)	**Pauley** (4–0)	Rivera (1–1)	–	37,354	26–25	
52	May 29	Yankees	1–7	Sabathia (6–3)	**Vargas** (3–3)		37,290	26–26	
53	May 30	Orioles	4–3	**Fister** (3–5)	Arrieta (6–3)	**League** (14)	22,819	27–26	
54	May 31	Orioles	3–2	**Ray** (2–1)	Guthrie (2–7)	**League** (15)	11,692	28–26	

June: 11–16 (Home: 6–8; Road: 5–8)

#	Date	Opponent	Score	Win	Loss	Save	Attendance	Record	Boxscore
55	June 1	Orioles	1–2	Johnson (4–1)	**Wright** (1–2)	Gregg (9)	18,036	28–27	
56	June 2	Rays	8–2	**Hernández** (6–4)	Shields (5–4)		16,376	29–27	
57	June 3	Rays	7–0	**Vargas** (4–3)	Sonnanstine (0–2)		24,492	30–27	
58	June 4	Rays	2–3	Hellickson (7–3)	**Fister** (3–6)	Farnsworth (11)	28,843	30–28	
59	June 5	Rays	9–6	**Wright** (2–2)	Howell (0–1)	**League** (16)	28,947	31–28	
60	June 6	@ White Sox	1–3	Danks (1–8)	**Pineda** (6–3)	Santos (11)	23,847	31–29	
61	June 7	@ White Sox	1–5	Humber (5–3)	**Hernández** (6–5)		21,337	31–30	
62	June 8	@ White Sox	7–4 (10)	**Laffey** (1–1)	Santos (2–2)	**League** (17)	21,517	32–30	
63	June 9	@ Tigers	1–4	Verlander (7–3)	**Fister** (3–7)	Valverde (16)	22,090	32–31	
64	June 10	@ Tigers	3–2	**Ray** (3–1)	Penny (5–5)	**League** (18)	30,511	33–31	
65	June 11	@ Tigers	1–8	Scherzer (8–2)	**Pineda** (6–4)		38,398	33–32	
66	June 12	@ Tigers	7–3	**Hernández** (7–5)	Porcello (6–4)		31,572	34–32	
67	June 13	Angels	3–6	Haren (6–4)	**Vargas** (4–4)	Walden (15)	20,238	34–33	
68	June 14	Angels	0–4	Weaver (8–4)	**Fister** (3–8)		17,634	34–34	
69	June 15	Angels	3–1	**Bédard** (4–4)	Santana (3–7)	**League** (19)	19,321	35–34	
70	June 17	Phillies	4–2	**Pineda** (7–4)	Oswalt (4–5)	**League** (20)	34,345	36–34	
71	June 18	Phillies	1–5	Stutes (1–0)	**Hernández** (7–6)		35,829	36–35	
72	June 19	Phillies	2–0	**Vargas** (5–4)	Hamels (9–3)		45,462	37–35	
73	June 21	@ Nationals	5–6	Coffey (3–0)	**Pauley** (4–1)		21,502	37–36	
74	June 22	@ Nationals	1–2	Lannan (5–5)	**Bédard** (4–5)	Storen (18)	21,367	37–37	
75	June 23	@ Nationals	0–1	Clippard (1–0)	**Ray** (3–2)		21,161	37–38	
76	June 24	@ Marlins (in Seattle)	5–1	**Hernández** (8–6)	Nolasco (4–4)		15,279	38–38	
77	June 25	@ Marlins (in Seattle)	2–4	Volstad (3–7)	**Vargas** (5–5)	Núñez (21)	16,896	38–39	
78	June 26	@ Marlins (in Seattle)	2–1 (10)	**Pauley** (5–1)	Choate (0–1)	**League** (21)	10,925	39–39	
79	June 27	Braves	1–3	Beachy (3–1)	**Bédard** (4–6)	Kimbrel (21)	26,467	39–40	
80	June 28	Braves	4–5	Hanson (9–4)	**Pineda** (7–5)	Kimbrel (22)	21,769	39–41	
81	June 29	Braves	3–5	Lowe (4–6)	**Hernández** (8–7)	Kimbrel (23)	30,472	39–42	

July: 6–20 (Home: 3–7; Road: 3–13)

#	Date	Opponent	Score	Win	Loss	Save	Attendance	Record	Boxscore
82	July 1	Padres	6–0	**Vargas** (6–5)	Moseley (2–8)		23,616	40–42	
83	July 2	Padres	0–1	Luebke (2–2)	**Fister** (3–9)	Bell (24)	22,798	40–43	
84	July 3	Padres	3–1	**Beavan** (1–0)	Latos (5–9)	**League** (22)	28,001	41–43	
85	July 4	@ Athletics	2–1	**Pineda** (8–5)	McCarthy (1–5)	**League** (23)	15,566	42–43	
86	July 5	@ Athletics	4–2 (10)	**League** (1–4)	Bailey (0–1)	**Wright** (1)	11,153	43–43	
87	July 6	@ Athletics	0–2	Moscoso (3–4)	**Vargas** (6–6)	Bailey (8)	19,491	43–44	
88	July 7	@ Angels	1–5	Weaver (11–4)	**Fister** (3–10)		41,223	43–45	
89	July 8	@ Angels	3–4	Walden (2–2)	**Pauley** (5–2)		40,161	43–46	
90	July 9	@ Angels	3–9	Piñeiro (5–3)	**Pineda** (8–6)		44,111	43–47	
91	July 10	@ Angels	2–4	Haren (10–5)	**Pauley** (5–3)	Walden (20)	39,505	43–48	
**All-Star Break**
92	July 14	Rangers	0–5	Holland (8–4)	**Vargas** (6–7)		25,997	43–49	
93	July 15	Rangers	0–4	Lewis (9–7)	**Fister** (3–11)	Feliz (19)	30,551	43–50	
94	July 16	Rangers	1–5	Wilson (10–3)	**Hernández** (8–8)		30,896	43–51	
95	July 17	Rangers	1–3	Harrison (8–7)	**Beavan** (1–1)	Feliz (20)	30,335	43–52	
96	July 19	@ Blue Jays	5–6 (14)	Janssen (3–0)	**Wright** (2–3)		15,957	43–53	
97	July 20	@ Blue Jays	6–11	Morrow (7–4)	**Vargas** (6–8)		18,093	43–54	
98	July 21	@ Blue Jays	5–7	Rauch (4–3)	**Pauley** (5–4)		23,146	43–55	
99	July 22	@ Red Sox	4–7	Lackey (8–8)	**Hernández** (8–9)	Papelbon (22)	38,048	43–56	
100	July 23	@ Red Sox	1–3	Beckett (9–3)	**Beavan** (1–2)	Papelbon (23)	38,115	43–57	
101	July 24	@ Red Sox	8–12	Wakefield (6–3)	**Pineda** (8–7)		37,650	43–58	
102	July 25	@ Yankees	3–10	García (9–7)	**Vargas** (6–9)		44,365	43–59	
103	July 26	@ Yankees	1–4	Sabathia (15–5)	**Fister** (3–12)	Rivera (26)	46,132	43–60	
104	July 27	@ Yankees	9–2	**Hernández** (9–9)	Hughes (1–3)		47,090	44–60	
105	July 29	Rays	0–8	Niemann (5–4)	**Bédard** (4–7)		26,570	44–61	
106	July 30	Rays	3–2	**Pineda** (9–7)	Cobb (3–1)	**League** (24)	24,985	45–61	
107	July 31	Rays	1–8	Hellickson (10–7)	**Vargas** (6–10)		20,382	45–62	

August: 13–15 (Home: 7–7; Road: 6–8)

#	Date	Opponent	Score	Win	Loss	Save	Attendance	Record	Boxscore
108	August 1	Athletics	8–4	**Beavan** (2–2)	Cahill (9–10)		23,335	46–62	
109	August 2	Athletics	4–2	**Hernández** (10–9)	Harden (2–2)	**League** (25)	22,576	47–62	
110	August 3	Athletics	7–4	**Furbush** (2–3)	Gonzalez (9–9)	**League** (26)	29,691	48–62	
111	August 5	@ Angels	0–1 (10)	Walden (3–3)	**Cortes** (0–1)		38,727	48–63	
112	August 6	@ Angels	5–1	**Beavan** (3–2)	Chatwood (6–8)		42,017	49–63	
113	August 7	@ Angels	1–2	Santana (8–8)	**Hernández** (10–10)	Walden (25)	38,823	49–64	
114	August 8	@ Rangers	2–9	Harrison (10–8)	**Furbush** (2–4)		27,771	49–65	
115	August 9	@ Rangers	6–7	Feliz (2–3)	**Gray** (0–1)		25,214	49–66	
116	August 10	@ Rangers	4–3	**Vargas** (7–10)	Uehara (1–2)	**League** (27)	30,087	50–66	
117	August 12	Red Sox	4–6	Lackey (11–8)	**Beavan** (3–3)	Papelbon (27)	40,682	50–67	
118	August 13	Red Sox	5–4	**Hernández** (11–10)	Beckett (9–5)	**League** (28)	41,326	51–67	
119	August 14	Red Sox	5–3	**Furbush** (3–4)	Wakefield (6–5)	**League** (29)	43,777	52–67	
120	August 15	Blue Jays	6–5	**Wilhelmsen** (1–0)	Rauch (5–4)	**League** (30)	28,530	53–67	
121	August 16	Blue Jays	7–13	Perez (2–2)	**Vargas** (7–11)		23,089	53–68	
122	August 17	Blue Jays	1–5	Morrow (9–7)	**Beavan** (3–4)		26,579	53–69	
123	August 19	@ Rays	2–3	Cruz (5–0)	**Hernández** (11–11)	Farnsworth (22)	14,884	53–70	
124	August 20	@ Rays	0–8	Hellickson (11–8)	**Furbush** (3–5)		20,184	53–71	
125	August 21	@ Rays	7–8	Farnsworth (5–1)	**Cortes** (0–2)		17,226	53–72	
126	August 22	@ Indians	3–2	**Ruffin** (1–0)	Perez (2–6)	**League** (31)	21,582	54–72	
127	August 23	@ Indians	5–7	Perez (3–6)	**League** (1–5)		22,805	54–73	
128	August 23	@ Indians	12–7	**Vasquez** (1–0)	McAllister (0–1)	**Gray** (1)	22,590	55–73	
129	August 24	@ Indians	9–2	**Hernández** (12–11)	Tomlin (12–7)		16,037	56–73	
130	August 26	White Sox	2–4	Peavy (6–6)	**Furbush** (3–6)	Sale (5)	28,621	56–74	
131	August 27	White Sox	0–3	Danks (6–9)	**Pineda** (9–8)		30,522	56–75	
132	August 28	White Sox	3–9	Floyd (12–10)	**Vargas** (7–12)		25,630	56–76	
133	August 29	Angels	5–3	**Wilhelmsen** (2–0)	Takahashi (3–3)	**League** (32)	16,990	57–76	
134	August 30	Angels	6–13	Williams (2–0)	**Vasquez** (1–1)		15,536	57–77	
135	August 31	Angels	2–1	**Hernández** (13–11)	Haren (13–8)		18,520	58–77	

September: 9–18 (Home: 5–9; Road: 4–9)

#	Date	Opponent	Score	Win	Loss	Save	Attendance	Record	Boxscore
136	September 1	Angels	3–4	Santana (11–9)	**Furbush** (3–7)	Walden (27)	19,453	58–78	
137	September 2	@ Athletics	2–9	Moscoso (7–8)	**Vargas** (7–13)		14,972	58–79	
138	September 3	@ Athletics	0–3	McCarthy (7–8)	**Pineda** (9–9)		19,732	58–80	
139	September 4	@ Athletics	5–8	Cahill (10–13)	**Beavan** (3–5)	Bailey (19)	19,384	58–81	
140	September 5	@ Angels	4–7	Haren (14–8)	**Vasquez** (1–2)		35,497	58–82	
141	September 6	@ Angels	2–1	**Hernández** (14–11)	Santana (11–10)	**League** (33)	36,533	59–82	
142	September 7	@ Angels	1–3	Williams (3–0)	**Furbush** (3–8)	Walden (29)	37,459	59–83	
143	September 8	Royals	4–1	**Vargas** (8–13)	Hochevar (10–11)	**League** (34)	14,377	60–83	
144	September 9	Royals	7–3	**Beavan** (4–5)	Francis (5–16)		14,805	61–83	
145	September 10	Royals	2–4	Paulino (3–10)	**Pineda** (9–10)	Soria (27)	17,884	61–84	
146	September 11	Royals	1–2	Teaford (1–0)	**Vasquez** (1–3)	Soria (28)	20,591	61–85	
147	September 12	Yankees	3–9	Hughes (5–5)	**Hernández** (14–12)		22,029	61–86	
148	September 13	Yankees	2–3	Burnett (10–11)	**Furbush** (3–9)	Rivera (41)	18,306	61–87	
149	September 14	Yankees	2–1 (12)	**Delabar** (1–0)	Wade (5–1)		20,327	62–87	
150	September 16	Rangers	4–0	**Beavan** (5–5)	Wilson (16–7)		17,607	63–87	
151	September 17	Rangers	6–7	Lewis (13–10)	**Vasquez** (1–4)	Feliz (27)	22,159	63–88	
152	September 18	Rangers	0–3	Harrison (13–9)	**Hernández** (14–13)	Feliz (28)	21,479	63–89	
153	September 19	@ Indians	12–6 (7)	**Furbush** (4–9)	Huff (2–6)		15,354	64–89	
154	September 20	@ Twins	5–4	**Vargas** (9–13)	Duensing (9–14)	**League** (35)	35,995	65–89	
155	September 21	@ Twins	5–4	**Jimenez** (1–0)	Slowey (0–7)	**League** (36)	36,263	66–89	
156	September 22	@ Twins	2–3	Nathan (2–1)	**Delabar** (1–1)		37,466	66–90	
157	September 23	@ Rangers	3–5	Harrison (14–9)	**Vasquez** (1–5)	Feliz (30)	43,874	66–91	
158	September 24	@ Rangers	3–7	Feldman (2–1)	**Hernández** (14–14)		40,242	66–92	
159	September 25	@ Rangers	5–12	Holland (16–5)	**Furbush** (4–10)		43,508	66–93	
160	September 26	Athletics	4–2	**Vargas** (10–13)	McCarthy (9–9)	**League** (36)	17,057	67–93	
161	September 27	Athletics	0–7	Cahill (12–14)	**Beavan** (5–6)		18,600	67–94	
162	September 28	Athletics	0–2	Gonzalez (16–12)	**Vasquez** (1–6)	Bailey (24)	20,173	67–95	

== 2011 roster ==
2011 Seattle Mariners
Roster
Pitchers: 49 Blake Beavan; 45 Érik Bédard; 57 Dan Cortes; 35 Steve Delabar; 58 Doug Fister; 41 Charlie Furbush; 60 Jeff Gray; 34 Félix Hernández; 37 César Jiménez; 23 Shawn Kelley; 32 Aaron Laffey; 43 Brandon League; 31 Josh Lueke; 39 David Pauley; 36 Michael Pineda; 46 Chris Ray; 52 Chance Ruffin; 38 Jason Vargas; 59 Anthony Vasquez; 54 Tom Wilhelmsen; 50 Jamey Wright	Catchers: 3 Josh Bard; 5 Chris Gimenez; 10 Adam Moore; 30 Miguel Olivo; Infielders: 13 Dustin Ackley; 20 Mike Carp; 9 Chone Figgins; 4 Adam Kennedy; 16 Alex Liddi; 1 Luis Rodríguez; 26 Brendan Ryan; 15 Kyle Seager; 17 Justin Smoak; 2 Jack Wilson	Outfielders: 15 Milton Bradley; 21 Franklin Gutiérrez; 56 Greg Halman; 12 Ryan Langerhans; 8 Carlos Peguero; 12 Trayvon Robinson; 55 Michael Saunders; 51 Ichiro Suzuki; 33 Casper Wells; 44 Mike Wilson; Other batters: 29 Jack Cust; 29 Wily Mo Pena	Manager: 22 Eric Wedge; Coaches: 18 Mike Brumley (first base); 40 Chris Chambliss (hitting); 28 Jeff Datz (third base); 47 Jaime Navarro (bullpen); 62 Jason Phillips (bullpen catcher); 6 Robby Thompson (bench); 48 Carl Willis (pitching)

=== Player stats ===
==== Batting ====
Note: G = Games played; AB = At bats; R = Runs scored; H = Hits; 2B = Doubles; 3B = Triples; HR = Home runs; RBI = Runs batted in; BB = Base on balls; SB = Stolen bases; AVG = Batting average

Player	G	AB	R	H	2B	3B	HR	RBI	BB	SB	AVG
Dustin Ackley	90	333	39	91	16	7	6	36	40	6	.273
Josh Bard	26	81	5	17	4	0	2	11	5	0	.210
Milton Bradley	28	101	12	22	6	1	2	13	13	4	.218
Mike Carp	79	290	27	80	17	1	12	46	19	0	.276
Jack Cust	67	225	19	48	15	1	3	23	44	0	.213
Chone Figgins	81	288	24	54	11	1	1	15	21	11	.188
Chris Gimenez	24	59	6	12	1	0	1	6	10	0	.203
Franklin Gutiérrez	92	322	26	72	13	0	1	19	16	13	.224
Greg Halman	35	87	7	20	2	1	2	6	2	5	.230
Adam Kennedy	114	380	36	89	23	1	7	38	22	8	.234
Ryan Langerhans	19	52	6	9	0	0	3	6	11	0	.173
Alex Liddi	15	40	7	9	3	0	3	6	3	1	.225
Adam Moore	2	6	0	1	1	0	0	0	0	0	.167
Miguel Olivo	130	477	54	107	19	1	19	62	20	6	224
Carlos Peguero	46	143	14	28	3	2	6	19	8	0	.196
Wily Mo Pena	22	67	8	14	3	0	2	8	5	0	.209
Trayvon Robinson	44	143	12	30	12	0	2	14	8	1	.210
Luis Rodríguez	44	117	10	23	10	0	2	14	16	1	.197
Brendan Ryan	123	436	51	108	19	3	3	39	34	13	.248
Kyle Seager	53	182	22	47	13	0	3	13	13	3	.258
Michael Saunders	58	161	16	24	5	0	2	8	12	6	.149
Justin Smoak	123	427	38	100	24	0	15	55	55	0	.234
Ichiro Suzuki	161	677	80	184	22	3	5	47	39	40	.272
Casper Wells	31	102	14	22	1	0	7	15	9	2	.216
Jack Wilson	62	173	22	43	8	0	0	11	9	5	.249
Mike Wilson	8	27	0	4	1	0	0	3	1	0	.148
Pitcher Totals	162	25	1	5	1	0	0	1	0	0	.200
Team totals	162	5421	556	1263	253	22	109	534	435	125	.233

==== Pitching ====
Note: W = Wins; L = Losses; ERA = Earned run average; G = Games pitched; GS = Games started; SV = Saves; IP = Innings pitched; H = Hits; R = Runs allowed; ER = Earned runs allowed; HR= Home runs allowed; BB = Walks allowed; SO = Strikeouts

Player	W	L	ERA	G	GS	SV	IP	H	R	ER	HR	BB	SO
Blake Beavan	5	6	4.27	15	15	0	97.0	106	46	46	13	15	42
Érik Bédard	4	7	3.45	16	16	0	91.1	77	41	35	11	30	87
Dan Cortes	0	2	5.91	10	0	0	10.2	13	7	7	1	6	3
Steve Delabar	1	1	2.57	6	0	0	7.0	5	2	2	1	4	7
Doug Fister	3	12	3.33	21	21	0	146.0	139	57	54	7	32	89
Charlie Furbush	3	7	6.62	11	10	0	53.0	61	41	39	11	16	41
Jeff Gray	0	1	4.89	24	0	1	35.0	39	19	19	3	17	16
Félix Hernández	14	14	3.47	33	33	0	233.2	218	99	90	19	67	222
César Jiménez	1	0	5.40	8	0	0	6.2	6	4	4	0	3	7
Shawn Kelley	0	0	0.00	10	0	0	12.2	7	0	0	0	3	10
Aaron Laffey	1	1	4.01	36	0	0	42.2	54	20	19	7	16	24
Brandon League	1	5	2.79	65	0	37	61.1	56	25	19	3	10	45
Josh Lueke	1	1	6.06	25	0	0	32.2	34	22	22	2	13	29
David Pauley	5	4	2.15	39	0	0	54.1	38	13	13	2	16	34
Michael Pineda	9	10	3.74	28	28	0	171.1	133	76	71	18	55	173
Chris Ray	3	2	4.68	29	0	0	32.2	33	18	17	2	12	22
Chance Ruffin	1	0	3.86	13	0	0	14.0	13	6	6	2	9	15
Jason Vargas	10	13	4.25	32	32	0	201.0	205	105	95	22	59	131
Anthony Vasquez	1	6	8.90	7	7	0	29.1	46	35	29	13	10	13
Tom Wilhelmsen	2	0	3.31	25	0	0	32.2	25	13	12	2	13	30
Jamey Wright	2	3	3.16	60	0	1	68.1	61	26	24	6	30	48
Team totals	67	95	3.90	162	162	39	1433.0	1369	675	621	145	436	1088

=== MLB debuts ===
Eleven players made their MLB debut with the 2011 Mariners, including future All-Stars Steve Delabar, Michael Pineda, and Kyle Seager as well as Alex Liddi, the first player born and raised in Italy to play in MLB.

- Josh Lueke and Tom Wilhelmsen (April 3)
- Michael Pineda (April 5)
- Mike Wilson (May 10)
- Dustin Ackley (June 17)
- Blake Beavan (July 3)
- Kyle Seager (July 7)
- Trayvon Robinson (August 5)
- Anthony Vasquez (August 23)
- Alex Liddi (September 7)
- Steve Delabar (September 11)

== Farm system ==
Level	Team	League	Manager
AAA	Tacoma Rainiers	Pacific Coast League	Daren Brown
AA	Jackson Generals	Southern League	Jim Pankovits
A	High Desert Mavericks	California League	José Moreno
A	Clinton LumberKings	Midwest League	Eddie Menchaca
A-Short Season	Everett AquaSox	Northwest League	Scott Steinmann
Rookie	Pulaski Mariners	Appalachian League	Rob Mummau
Rookie	AZL Mariners	Arizona League	Jesús Azuaje
