= Jon Daniels =

American baseball executive (born 1977)

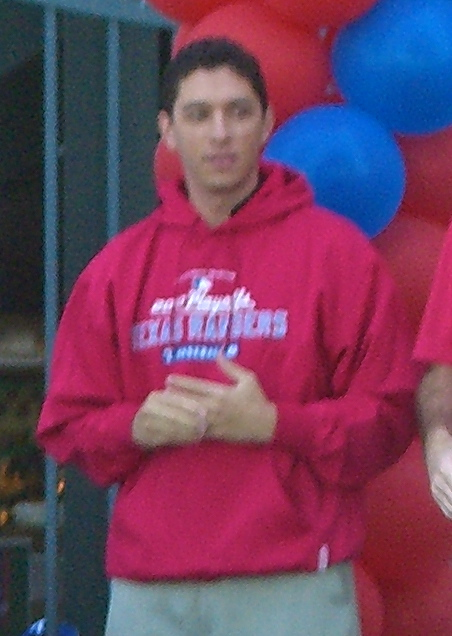
- Daniels in 2010

Tampa Bay Rays
- Senior Advisor
- Born: August 24, 1977 (age 49); Queens, New York City, U.S.

Teams
- Colorado Rockies (2000–2004); Tampa Bay Rays (2022–present); General manager: Texas Rangers (2005–2022)

Career highlights and awards
- 2× American League champion; Baseball America Executive of the Year (2010)

Jon Daniels (born August 24, 1977) is an American professional baseball executive who is a senior advisor at the Tampa Bay Rays of Major League Baseball (MLB).

From 2005 to 2020, he was general manager (GM) of the Texas Rangers. When hired at the age of 28, he was the youngest GM in the league's history. He was the team's president of baseball operations between 2013 and 2022.

== Early life and education ==
Daniels was born and raised to a Jewish family in Queens, New York. He attended Hunter College High School and Cornell University, majored in Applied Economics and Management, and joined the Delta Chi Fraternity. One of his classmates was A. J. Preller. After graduating from Cornell in 1999, Daniels went into business development for Allied Domecq. In 2003, he married Robyn Daniels. The couple resides in Southlake, Texas, with their son, Lincoln, and daughters Harper and Charlotte.

== Baseball career ==
=== Early career ===
Daniels' baseball career began in 2001, when he landed an internship with the Colorado Rockies. After the baseball season concluded that year, Daniels was informed of an opening in the Texas Rangers organization. He applied and was hired by then general manager John Hart as an assistant in the baseball operations department. He was promoted to director of baseball operations in October 2003. In this role, Daniels negotiated multi-year contracts for Michael Young, Hank Blalock, and Francisco Cordero. In July 2004, Grady Fuson left the organization and Daniels was promoted to assistant general manager.

=== General manager ===
On October 4, 2005, Hart announced he was stepping down as GM and the Rangers replaced him with Daniels. At the age of 28 years and 41 days, Daniels became the youngest general manager in Major League Baseball history.

Daniels' first major deal as general manager was trading Alfonso Soriano to the Washington Nationals for Brad Wilkerson, Terrmel Sledge, and Armando Galarraga. Soriano hit 46 homers and went on to steal 41 bases the next season and Wilkerson played most of the season injured and ended with a .222 batting average. On the other hand, trading Soriano opened up a spot for rookie Ian Kinsler and freed up money that would have been spent on Soriano's salary to be more flexible in offering Kevin Millwood a large contract.

A trade made in December of 2005, sent pitcher Chris Young, outfielder Sledge and first baseman Adrián González to the San Diego Padres for pitchers Adam Eaton and Akinori Otsuka, and catcher Billy Killian. While Otsuka filled a valuable role as the Rangers closer, the oft-injured Eaton only pitched 65 innings with an ERA of 5.12. Dallas-native Chris Young pitched 180 innings for the Padres, racking up 164 K's and posting an ERA of 3.46. Adrián González (considered a prized prospect) batted .304 for the Padres while hitting 24 home runs. This is generally considered the worst move of Daniels' career.

Some of Daniels' other moves have been better received. On the eve of the 2006 season, after losing #2 starter Eaton to injury, Daniels made a three-way deal, sending Juan Dominguez to the Oakland Athletics for John Rheinecker and Freddie Bynum, the latter of which he turned and traded to the Chicago Cubs for John Koronka. Koronka and Rheinecker helped shore up the Rangers rotation in April and May, while Dominguez stayed at Oakland's AAA affiliate for the entire year.

Another trade Daniels made was sending Laynce Nix, Kevin Mench, and Francisco Cordero to the Milwaukee Brewers for minor leaguer Nelson Cruz, and All-star left fielder Carlos Lee. The trade was completed just before the trade deadline of the 2006 season. Lee was the most sought after trade target during the season and provided the Rangers with a strong bat in the middle of the lineup. Lee then signed a $100 million free agent contract with the Houston Astros, giving the Rangers the #17 and #35 draft picks in 2007 (Blake Beavan and Julio Borbon, respectively) as compensation. Cruz emerged as a power-hitting All-Star in the 2009 season for the Rangers, and became a mainstay in the lineup during the World Series years. In late December 2006, Daniels collaborated with White Sox general manager Kenny Williams, engineering a trade in which the Rangers acquired Brandon McCarthy in exchange for John Danks.

The Rangers committed fully to a rebuilding program during 2007, one that would directly lead to the team's unparalleled playoff success several years later. On July 31, 2007, Daniels made two career-defining trades, one with the Atlanta Braves, the other with Boston Red Sox. Daniels first agreed with Atlanta Braves General Manager John Schuerholz to trade coveted slugger Mark Teixeira and relief pitcher Ron Mahay for catching prospect Jarrod Saltalamacchia. The Rangers were also able to obtain four minor leaguers in the trade. The first of these prospects, left-hander Matt Harrison, emerged as a starter in the 2009 Ranger rotation. The second of these prospects acquired from the Braves, Elvis Andrus, was widely hailed as an elite young shortstop. Another, Neftalí Feliz, a well regarded power pitcher, joined the Rangers bullpen in 2009. Both Andrus and Feliz were named as All-Stars in 2010, a season in which Feliz was voted rookie of the year.

But there was another substantive trade that day, which occurred just before the trade deadline, Daniels sent closer Éric Gagné to the Boston Red Sox for young starting pitcher Kason Gabbard, Triple-A prospect David Murphy, and rookie-league outfielder Engel Beltre. Not receiving as much attention at the time, Daniels also made a third trade prior to the deadline sending center fielder Kenny Lofton to the Indians for catching prospect Max Ramírez. As a result of the 2007 draft, trades and Latin America free agent signings, the Rangers jumped to the #4 system in Baseball America 2008 organization rankings. This represented the biggest jump since Baseball America began ranking MLB farm systems.

Before the 2008 Season, Daniels traded the second member of what was once dubbed the "DVD trio", sending Edinson Vólquez to the Reds for outfielder Josh Hamilton. This trade has received positive reviews for both sides, as each player made an All-star appearance with their new team and both teams made the playoffs in the 2010 season. Hamilton emerged as one of the biggest stars in the game, winning the 2010 AL MVP, and establishing himself as an elite offensive performer. Baseball America recognized the Rangers as having the best farm system following the 2008 season. Notable additions to the system in 2008 included draft picks Justin Smoak, Robbie Ross, and Joe Wieland.

At the 2009 Winter Meetings, Daniels orchestrated a deal with the Baltimore Orioles, dealing veteran starting pitcher Kevin Millwood for young reliever Chris Ray and left-handed pitcher Ben Snyder. With the salary freed up by the departure of Millwood, the Rangers signed free agent Rich Harden. Daniels also signed free agents Vladimir Guerrero and Colby Lewis. On July 1, 2010, Daniels acquired catcher Bengie Molina from the San Francisco Giants for relief pitcher Chris Ray and prospect Michael Main. On July 9, Daniels acquired pitchers Cliff Lee and Mark Lowe from the Seattle Mariners for Blake Beavan, Matt Lawson, Josh Lueke, and prized prospect Justin Smoak. On July 29, Daniels acquired Jorge Cantú from the Florida Marlins for prospects Evan Reed and Omar Poveda. On July 30, Daniels acquired Cristian Guzmán from the Washington Nationals for prospects Ryan Tatusko and Tanner Roark. On July 31, after high expectations and several disappointments, Daniels traded away the Texas Rangers 2010 opening day starting catcher Jarrod Saltalamacchia to the Boston Red Sox for prospects Chris McGuiness, Roman Mendez, a player to be named later, and cash considerations equaling near $350,000. The Rangers won the American League pennant when they eliminated the New York Yankees from the ALCS in 6 games. On December 8, Daniels was named the Baseball America Major League Executive of the Year.

On March 1, 2013, Daniels was promoted by the Rangers to be president of baseball operations and general manager. Nolan Ryan resigned as CEO of the Rangers and sold his stake in the team in October 2013. Daniels then became operating head of the franchise. Co-chairmen and principal owners Ray Davis and Bob Simpson largely left the Rangers' day-to-day operations in Daniels' hands. Ryan stated that he probably should have asked former Rangers owner Tom Hicks to help facilitate his relationship with Jon Daniels, when Ryan joined the organization in 2008 as club president. Daniels agreed to a three-year extension with the Rangers on November 14, 2014.

On November 20, 2013, Daniels traded Ian Kinsler to the Detroit Tigers for Prince Fielder and cash. The 2014 season was disastrous the Rangers hit with many injuries to top players finished last in the entire American League 67-95 (and 3rd worst in all of MLB). In 2015, the Rangers clinched the American League West title on the final day of the season, the team's 6th division title and 7th postseason appearance in franchise history. The Rangers started the season as poorly as their 2014 season ended, reaching a season low eight games under .500 (8-16) on May 3. The lone bright spot was the resurgence of Prince Fielder from season-ending surgery the prior year.

The second half of the season saw the team begin a resurgence, led in part by the acquisition of Cole Hamels from Philadelphia, the emergence of Shawn Tolleson as the team's closer after the team released Neftalí Feliz, the returns of Martín Pérez and Derek Holland from the disabled list, and vastly improved play by Shin-Soo Choo and Adrián Beltré. However, as late as August 3 the Rangers were still below .500. The improved play continued, and on September 15 (during a four-game home series against their in-state and division rivals the Houston Astros) the Rangers would defeat the Astros 6–5, taking the division lead in the process and ultimately sweeping the series with the Astros. The Rangers would not relinquish the division lead from that point forward, though they would not clinch the division until the last day of the season when they defeated the Los Angeles Angels 9–2. The Rangers lost to the Toronto Blue Jays in five games in the Division Series.

The Rangers won the AL West championship for the second straight season in 2016, and faced the Toronto Blue Jays in the Division Series. For the first time in franchise history, the Rangers finished with the American League's best record; thus giving them (potentially) home field advantage throughout the entire American League playoffs (and, with the American League's win in the 2016 All-Star Game, possible home field advantage throughout the entire World Series as well).

The Rangers fired Daniels on August 17, 2022, after six consecutive losing seasons. Davis said that Daniels was being relieved of his duties immediately after the decision was made not to renew his contract at the end of this season.

=== Tampa Bay Rays ===
On November 11, 2022, he was hired by the Tampa Bay Rays to serve as a senior advisor in the baseball operations department.

Preceded by John Hart	Texas Rangers General Manager; 2005–2020	Succeeded by Chris Young
Preceded by Role established	Texas Rangers President of Baseball Operations; 2013–2022	Succeeded by Chris Young
