= Mike Wilson (outfielder) =

American baseball player (born 1983)

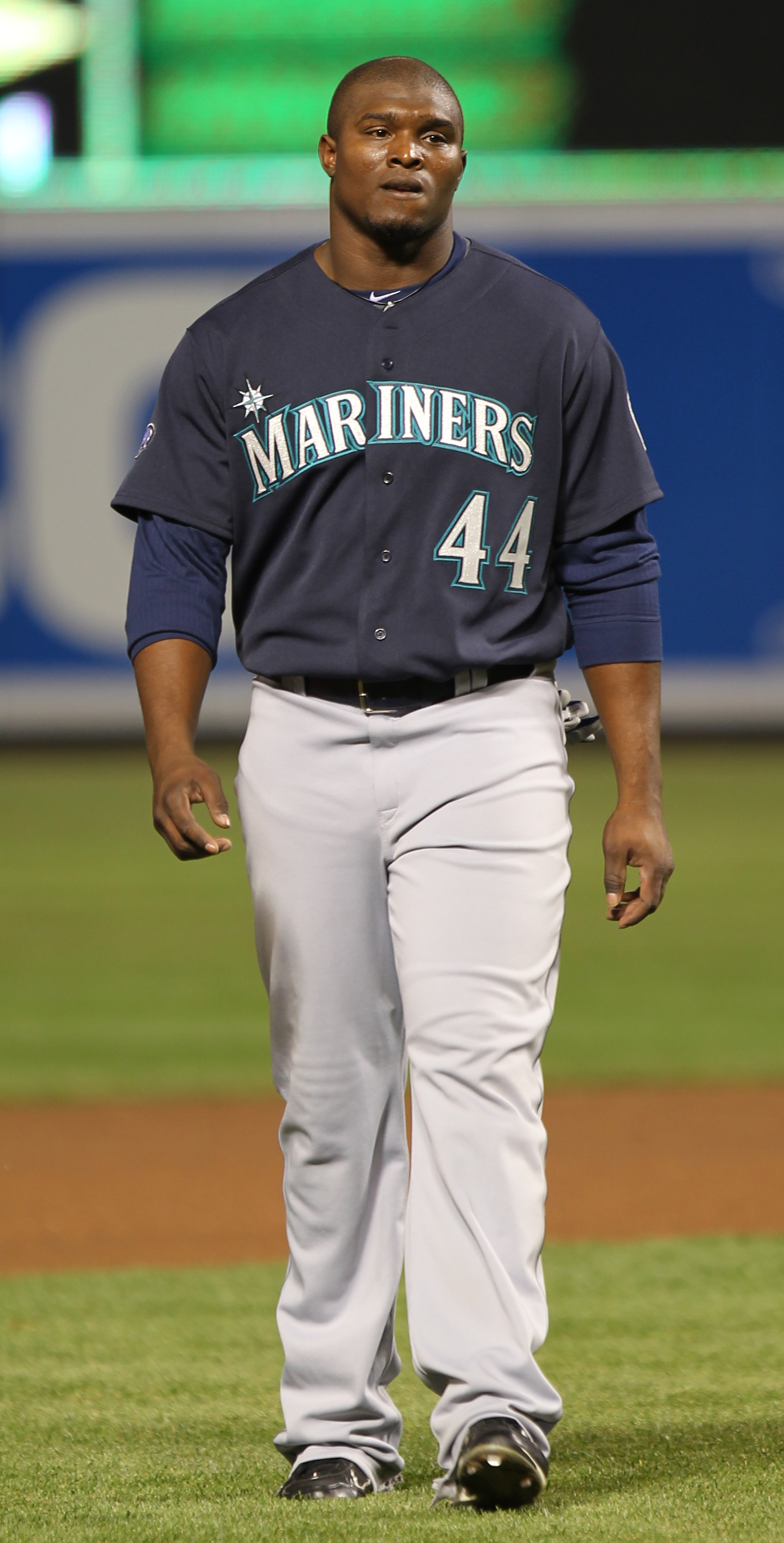
- Wilson with the Seattle Mariners in 2011
- Outfielder
- Born: June 29, 1983 (age 42); Tulsa, Oklahoma, U.S.
- Batted: Right Threw: Right

MLB debut
- May 10, 2011, for the Seattle Mariners

Last MLB appearance
- June 6, 2011, for the Seattle Mariners

MLB statistics
- Batting average: .148
- Home runs: 0
- Runs batted in: 3
- Stats at Baseball Reference

Teams
- Seattle Mariners (2011)
Medals
Men's baseball
Representing United States
World Junior Baseball Championship
Silver medal – second place	2000 Edmonton	Team

Michael LaDon Wilson (born June 29, 1983) is an American former professional baseball outfielder. His most recent team was the Winnipeg Goldeyes of the Can-Am League in 2015. He played in Major League Baseball for the Seattle Mariners in 2011.

== Early life ==
Wilson attended Booker T. Washington High School. He received a scholarship offer to play college football at Oklahoma. The Seattle Mariners drafted Wilson in the second round of the 2001 Major League Baseball draft.

== Career ==
=== Seattle Mariners ===
He was released by the Mariners on February 21, 2009, to make room on the roster for Ken Griffey Jr. but was re-signed by the Mariners to a minor league deal two days later. On November 23, 2010, Wilson signed a minor league deal with an invitation to Spring Training.

In 2009, Wilson set a team record for home runs in spring training, with eight (a record broken in 2013 by Michael Morse). In total, Wilson spent ten seasons in Seattle's farm system and once considered switching to football, but at 27, was too old. He had also thought about playing in Japan, and had three opportunities to leave the Seattle Mariners as a free agent.

On May 9, 2011, the Mariners purchased a contract for Wilson and called him up from the minors. In June, after appearing in eight games, he was demoted in order to make room for Mike Carp. On October 6, 2012, Wilson elected free agency.

=== New York Mets ===
He signed a minor league contract with the New York Mets in early 2013. The Mets released Wilson in March 2013.

=== San Diego Padres ===
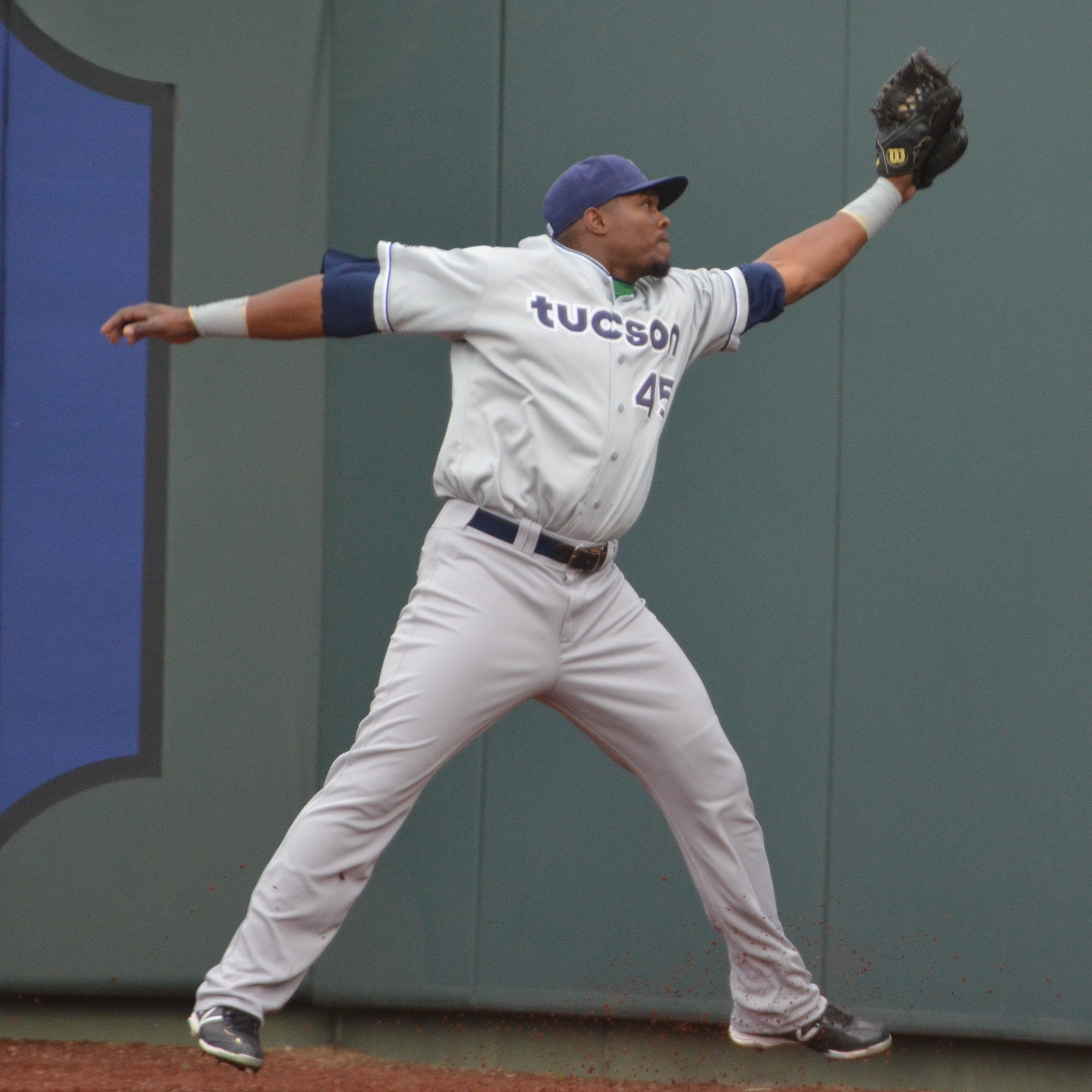
Wilson playing for the Tucson Padres, triple-A affiliates of the San Diego Padres, in 2013

He was signed to a Minor League contract by the San Diego Padres on May 18, 2013, and was assigned to their Triple A affiliate in Tucson.

=== Cincinnati Reds ===
He signed a minor league deal with the Cincinnati Reds on November 6, 2013. Wilson was released by the Reds Triple A affiliate, the Louisville Bats on May 16, 2014.

=== Winnipeg Goldeyes ===
Wilson signed with the Winnipeg Goldeyes of the American Association of Independent Professional Baseball for the 2015 season.
