= Carlos Peguero =

Dominican baseball player (born 1987)

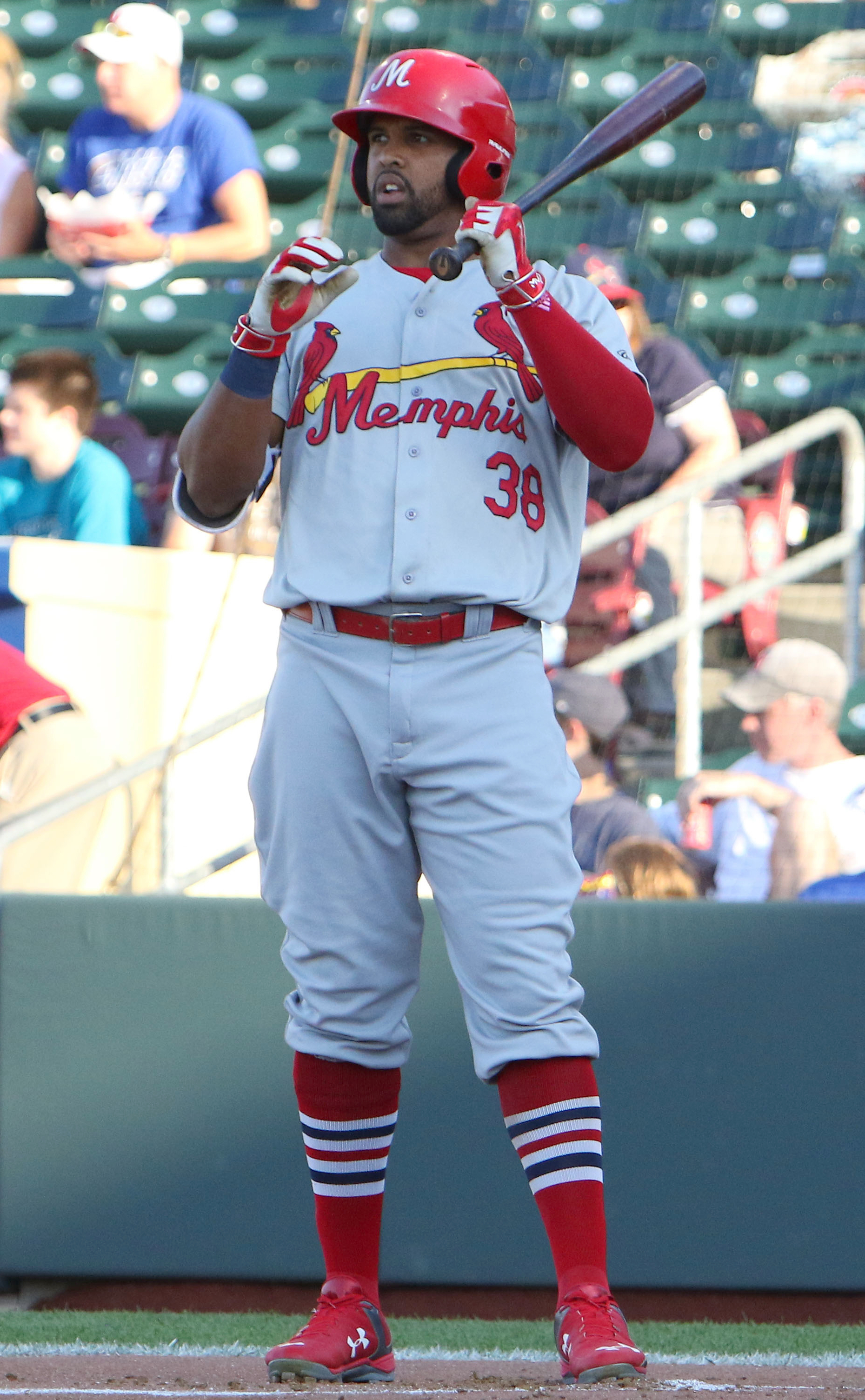
- Peguero with the Memphis Redbirds, triple-A affiliate of the St. Louis Cardinals in 2016

Centauros de La Guaira – No. 24
- Outfielder
- Born: February 22, 1987 (age 39); Hondo Valle, Dominican Republic
- Bats: Left Throws: Left

Professional debut
- MLB: April 19, 2011, for the Seattle Mariners
- NPB: July 21, 2016, for the Tohoku Rakuten Golden Eagles
- KBO: July 16, 2019, for the LG Twins

MLB statistics (through 2015 season)
- Batting average: .194
- Home runs: 13
- Runs batted in: 37

NPB statistics (through 2018 season)
- Batting average: .265
- Home runs: 53
- Runs batted in: 145

KBO statistics (through 2019 season)
- Batting average: .289
- Home runs: 9
- Runs batted in: 44
- Stats at Baseball Reference

Teams
- Seattle Mariners (2011–2013); Kansas City Royals (2014); Texas Rangers (2015); Boston Red Sox (2015); Tohoku Rakuten Golden Eagles (2016–2018); LG Twins (2019)

Carlos Ángel Peguero D'Oleo (born February 22, 1987) is a Dominican professional baseball left fielder for the Centauros de La Guaira of the Venezuelan Major League. He signed with the Seattle Mariners as an international free agent on January 20, 2005, with whom he made his Major League Baseball (MLB) debut in 2011. He has also played in MLB for the Kansas City Royals, Texas Rangers and Boston Red Sox. Additionally, he has played in Nippon Professional Baseball (NPB) for the Tohoku Rakuten Golden Eagles and in the KBO League for the LG Twins.

== Professional career ==
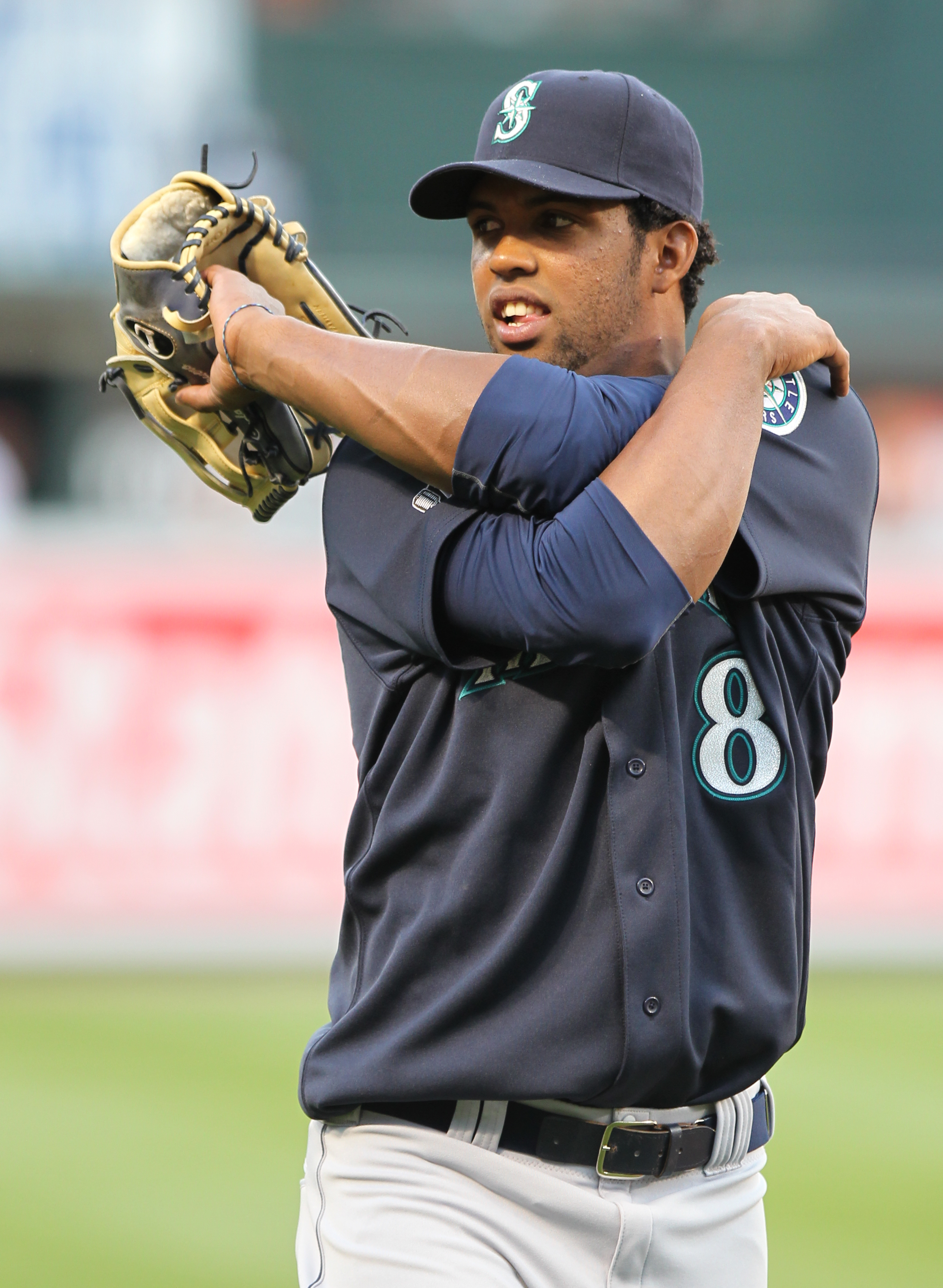
Peguero during his tenure with the Seattle Mariners in 2011

=== Seattle Mariners ===
Peguero began his professional career in 2005 with the Dominican Summer League, batting .251 in 59 games. In 2006 he finished tied for first in home runs with seven, tied for second in triples with seven, second in extra base hits with 24 and tied for ninth in average with .313 in the Arizona League. Peguero hit safely in 23 of 34 games. He hit a home run in his second at-bat of the season on June 23 against the Arizona League Angels. He went 3-for-4 with two runs, two home runs and two RBIs on June 30. He hit three home runs in a five-game span from July 29 to August 2. He recorded 11 multi-hit games, including three three-hit games and a season-high four hits on August 1. He had four games with season-high three RBIs. On August 8 he was promoted to the Rookie-level Everett AquaSox. At the end of the season he participated in the Mariners Arizona Fall League.

In 2007, Peguero appeared in 79 games with the Single-A Wisconsin Timber Rattlers. He hit .407 during seven-game hitting streak from May 4–9. He went 3-for-5 with four RBIs on May 12. He recorded season-high eight-game hit streak, hitting .364, from June 11–21. He knocked in a career-high seven RBIs, going 3-for-5 with a two-run double, a three-run double and a three-run homer on June 15 against the Cedar Rapids Kernels. Peguero was on the disabled list with a left elbow strain from July 31 through the end of the season. He was named Wisconsin's Most Valuable Player by the Seattle Mariners. He participated in the Mariners' 2007 Arizona Fall League and played in the Dominican Winter League.

Peguero spent the 2008 season with High Desert. He had 17 multi-RBI games, including a season-high four RBIs on April 3. He recorded a season-high four hits on June 17. Peguero was placed on the disabled list on July 17 for the remainder of the season, with a sprained left wrist. He participated in the Mariners' Advance Development League in Peoria, Arizona.

=== Kansas City Royals ===
The Kansas City Royals acquired Peguero from the Seattle Mariners on January 29, 2014, for cash considerations. The Royals designated him for assignment on March 25, 2014, after they acquired Patrick Schuster off waivers, in the hopes that Peguero would clear waivers so they could assign him to the Omaha Storm Chasers. He was released by the Royals on December 19, 2014.

=== Texas Rangers ===
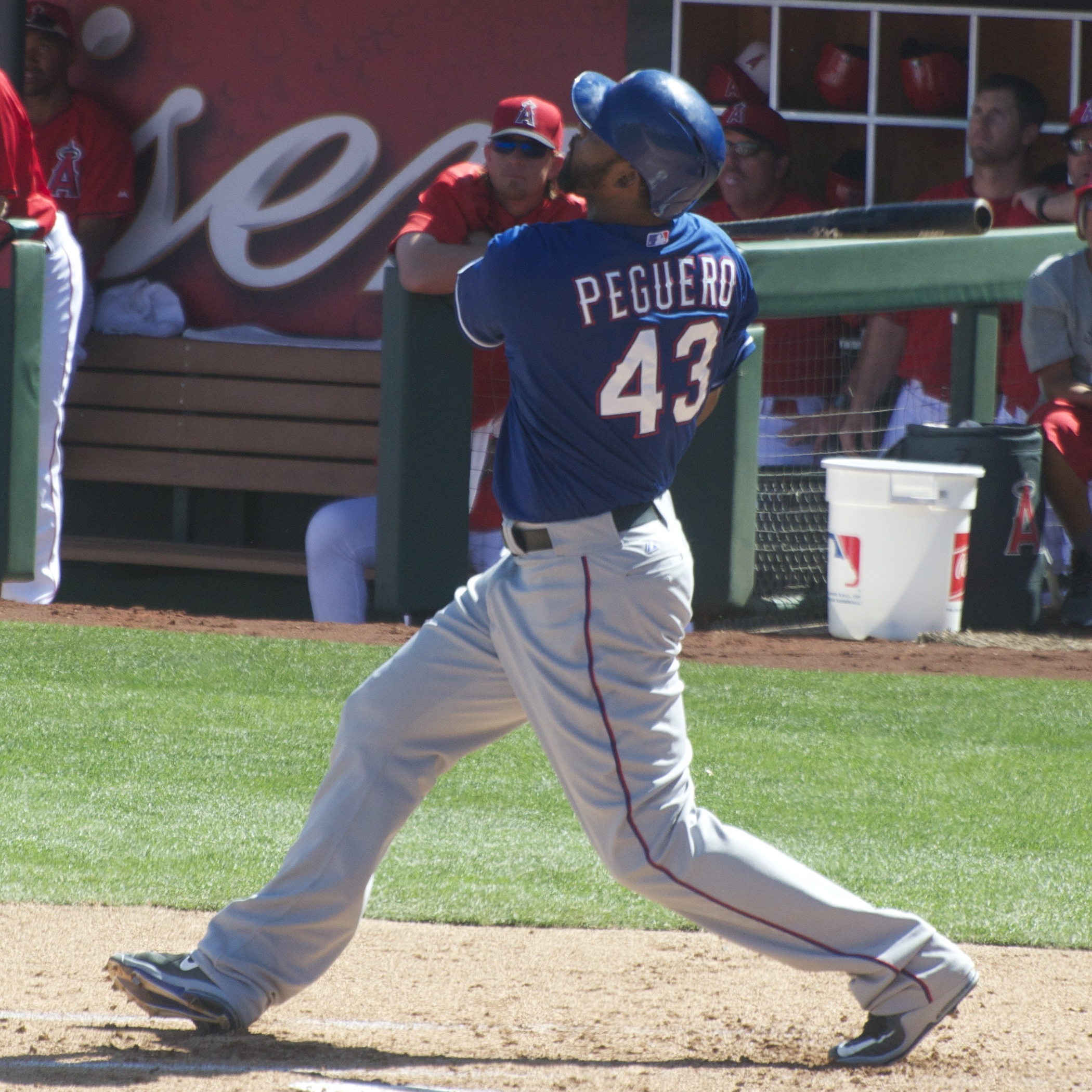
Peguero batting for the Texas Rangers in 2015 spring training

Peguero signed a minor league deal with the Texas Rangers on January 13, 2015. He was called up on April 11, and made his Rangers debut the same day. He was designated for assignment on May 20.

=== Boston Red Sox ===
On May 27, 2015, the Boston Red Sox acquired Peguero for cash considerations. On June 4, Peguero was designated for assignment, but rejoined the team by signing a minor league contract on June 15.

=== St. Louis Cardinals ===
The St. Louis Cardinals announced on January 22, 2016, that they signed Peguero to a minor league deal with an invitation to major league spring training camp. His minor league totals in 10 previous seasons included a .273 average, .335 OBP and .511 SLG. The Cardinals assigned him to the Triple-A Memphis Redbirds of the Pacific Coast League, where he batted .283, .355 OBP and .435 SLG.

=== Tohoku Rakuten Golden Eagles ===
The Cardinals sold Peguero's contract to the Tohoku Rakuten Golden Eagles of Nippon Professional Baseball (NPB) on July 8, 2016.

On July 12, 2017, Peguero hit a home run with distance of 513 ft (156.4 m) at the Fukuoka Yahuoku! Dome.

=== Toros de Tijuana ===
On June 4, 2019, Peguero signed with the Toros de Tijuana of the Mexican League. He appeared in 22 games and slashed .259/.362/.482 with 5 home runs and 14 RBIs.

=== LG Twins ===
On July 10, 2019, Peguero signed with the LG Twins of the KBO League. He became a free agent following the season.

=== Pericos de Puebla ===
On February 19, 2020, Peguero signed with the Pericos de Puebla of the Mexican League. However, he was released by the Pericos on June 25 without appearing in a game.

=== El Águila de Veracruz ===
On July 22, 2024, after 4 years of inactivity Peguero signed with the El Águila de Veracruz of the Mexican League. In 8 games for Veracruz, he went 6–for–20 (.300) with no home runs and two RBI.

=== Conspiradores de Querétaro ===
On February 25, 2025, Peguero signed with the Conspiradores de Querétaro of the Mexican League. In 37 appearances for Querétaro, he batted .267/.399/.431 with four home runs, 18 RBI, and one stolen base. Peguero was released by the Conspiradores on July 2.

=== Centauros de La Guaira ===
On April 21, 2026, Peguero signed with the Centauros de La Guaira of the Venezuelan Major League. In 14 games he hit .255/.345/.333 with one home run and 6 RBIs.

== Personal life ==
Peguero is married to Maria Jacqueline (née Borbón) Peguero, the youngest daughter of former major league relief pitcher Pedro Borbón, and sister of Pedro Borbón, Jr., also a former major league relief pitcher.
