= Anthony Vasquez =

American baseball player (born 1986)

- Pitcher
- Born: September 19, 1986 (age 39); San Antonio, Texas, U.S.
- Batted: Left Threw: Left

MLB debut
- August 23, 2011, for the Seattle Mariners

Last appearance
- September 28, 2011, for the Seattle Mariners

MLB statistics
- Win–loss record: 1–6
- Earned run average: 8.90
- Strikeouts: 13
- Stats at Baseball Reference

Teams
- Seattle Mariners (2011)
Medals
Men's baseball
Representing United States
WBSC Premier12
Silver medal – second place	2015 Tokyo	Team

Anthony Russell Vasquez (born September 19, 1986) is an American former professional baseball pitcher. He played in Major League Baseball (MLB) for the Seattle Mariners in 2011.

== Career ==
Vasquez attended Ronald Reagan High School in San Antonio, Texas, then Texas A&M University and the University of Southern California (USC). He played college baseball for the Texas A&M Aggies and the USC Trojans.

=== Seattle Mariners ===
The Seattle Mariners selected Vasquez in the 18th round of the 2009 MLB draft. He made his professional debut with the rookie ball Pulaski Mariners. He spent the 2010 season playing for three Mariners affiliates, the Single-A Clinton LumberKings, the High-A High Desert Mavericks, and the Double-A West Tenn Diamond Jaxx, recording a cumulative 11–9 record and 2.46 ERA in 28 games for the clubs.

Vasquez made his MLB debut on August 23, 2011. He recorded his first MLB strikeout against the second batter he faced. However, he struggled in his only season in the majors. On November 3, he was outrighted off of the 40-man roster after posting a 8.90 ERA in 29 1/3 innings for the Mariners. Vasquez spent the 2012 season in Triple-A with the Tacoma Rainiers, pitching to a 6.53 ERA and 6–5 record. He split the 2013 season between the Double-A Jackson Generals and Clinton, accumulating a 2–6 record and 4.08 ERA in 15 appearances. On March 27, 2014, the Mariners released Vasquez.

=== Baltimore Orioles ===
Vasquez signed a minor league deal with the Baltimore Orioles on April 8, 2014. He split the season between the Triple-A Norfolk Tides and the Double-A Bowie Baysox, pitching to an 8–8 record and 4.95 ERA before electing free agency after the season on November 4.

=== Philadelphia Phillies ===
Vasquez signed a minor league deal with the Philadelphia Phillies on February 3, 2015. He split the year between the Triple-A Lehigh Valley IronPigs and the Double-A Reading Fightin Phils, recording a 9–8 record and 4.10 ERA. He elected free agency after the season and re-signed with the Phillies on January 12, 2016. In 2016 with Lehigh Valley and Reading, Vasquez pitched to a 12–4 record and 3.08 ERA with 119 strikeouts. He elected free agency following the season on November 7.

=== Detroit Tigers ===
On January 10, 2017, Vasquez signed a minor-league contract with the Detroit Tigers. Vasquez made 27 starts split between the Double-A Erie SeaWolves and Triple-A Toledo Mud Hens, registering a cumulative 12–10 record and 3.83 ERA with 104 strikeouts in 164 2/3 innings pitched. He elected free agency following the season on November 6.

=== Arizona Diamondbacks ===
On February 23, 2018, Vasquez signed a minor league deal with the Arizona Diamondbacks. He was released by the organization on August 2.

=== Sultanes de Monterrey ===
On August 17, 2018, Vasquez signed with the Sultanes de Monterrey of the Mexican League. On January 16, 2019, Vasquez signed a minor league deal with the Diamondbacks. He was released on July 25.

Days later, on July 30, Vasquez again signed with the Sultanes de Monterrey. After the regular season, he played for Tomateros de Culiacán of the Mexican Pacific League(LVMP). He has also played for Mexico in the 2020 Caribbean Series.

Vasquez did not play any LMB games in 2020 due to cancellation of the LMB season during the COVID-19 pandemic. In July 2020, Vasquez signed on to play for the Eastern Reyes del Tigre of the Constellation Energy League, a makeshift four-team independent league created as a result of the COVID-19 pandemic. He was subsequently named to the league's All-Star team. After the 2020 season, Vasquez played for Tomateros of the LVMP. He also again played for Mexico in the 2021 Caribbean Series.

=== Mariachis de Guadalajara ===
On May 20, 2021, Vasquez signed with the Mariachis de Guadalajara of the Mexican League. He made 10 starts for Guadalajara in 2021, registering a 5–1 record and 4.39 ERA with 24 strikeouts across 53 1/3 innings of work. Vasquez was released by the Mariachis on September 23, 2022.

After retiring from baseball, he became a financial planner.

== Player profile ==
Vasquez threw a fastball around 85 miles per hour (137 km/h), a changeup at around 76 miles per hour (122 km/h), and a curveball that sat around 70 miles per hour (110 km/h).

== Personal life ==
Vasquez's father, Rudy, works as a scout for the Los Angeles Angels of Anaheim. In November 2012, Vasquez underwent surgery to repair a cerebral arteriovenous malformation after a blood vessel in his brain ruptured. His relative, Chris Beene, is a major influence in his life.
