= Maikel Cleto =

Dominican baseball player (born 1989)

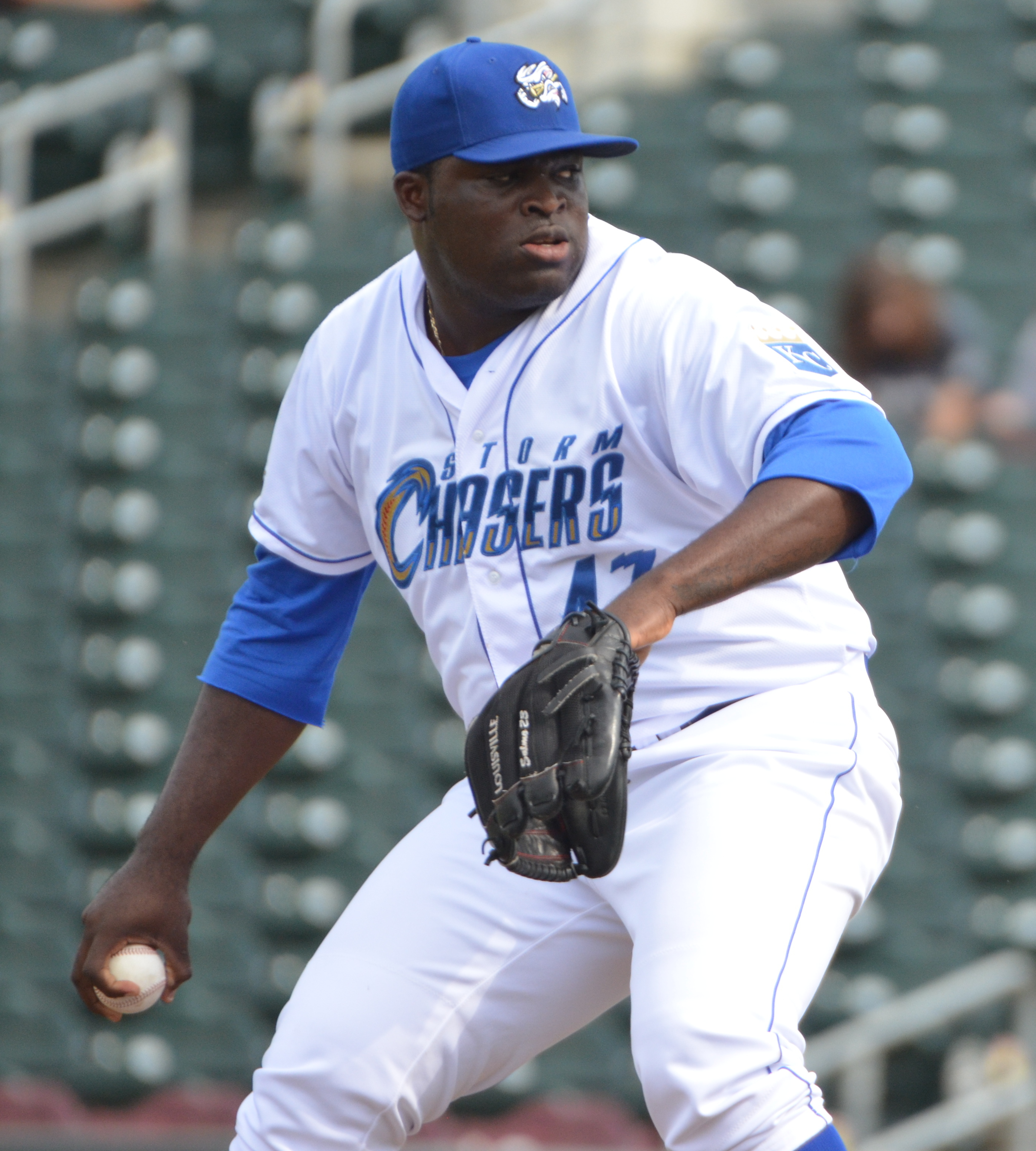
- Cleto with the Omaha Storm Chasers in 2013
- Pitcher
- Born: May 1, 1989 (age 37); Santo Domingo, Dominican Republic
- Batted: Right Threw: Right

MLB debut
- June 2, 2011, for the St. Louis Cardinals

Last MLB appearance
- September 26, 2014, for the Chicago White Sox

MLB statistics
- Win–loss record: 0–1
- Earned run average: 6.60
- Strikeouts: 58
- Stats at Baseball Reference

Teams
- St. Louis Cardinals (2011–2013); Chicago White Sox (2014)

Maikel Jose Cleto (born May 1, 1989) is a Dominican former professional baseball pitcher. He played in Major League Baseball (MLB) for the St. Louis Cardinals and Chicago White Sox.

== Professional career ==
=== New York Mets ===
Cleto began his professional career in 2007 with the Gulf Coast League Mets. He went 1–2 with a 5.03 ERA, one save, and 28 strikeouts.

In 2008 Cleto split the season between the Single-A Savannah Sand Gnats and the High-A St. Lucie Mets. He had a combined record of 5–12 with a 4.41 ERA, one shutout, and 82 strikeouts in 26 games (23 starts) split between the two affiliates.

=== Seattle Mariners ===
On December 11, 2008, Cleto was traded to the Mariners with Aaron Heilman, Endy Chávez, Jason Vargas, Mike Carp and Ezequiel Carrera in exchange for J. J. Putz, Jeremy Reed and Sean Green.

Cleto split the 2009 season between the Rookie-Level Peoria Mariners and the Class-A Clinton LumberKings. He went 0–4 with a 5.54 ERA and 25 strikeouts in nine games, eight starts. He attended spring training with the Mariners but was assigned to the Minor Leagues early in camp. Cleto was placed on the disabled list of July 7 due to back discomfort and made his return on August 15.

=== St. Louis Cardinals ===
On December 12, 2010, Cleto was traded to the St. Louis Cardinals in exchange for shortstop Brendan Ryan. Cleto was promoted to the major leagues for the first time on June 2, 2011, (the same day Lance Lynn was also called up), directly from the Double-A (Springfield Cardinals) to shore up an overworked bullpen. In 3 games during his rookie campaign, he struggled to a 12.46 ERA with 6 strikeouts across 4 1/3 innings pitched.

Cleto made 9 appearances for the Cardinals in 2012, struggling to a 7.00 ERA with 15 strikeouts over 9 innings of work. He made one appearance for St. Louis in 2013, allowing five runs with five strikeouts across 2 1/3 innings.

=== Kansas City Royals ===
Cleto was claimed off waivers to the Kansas City Royals on June 23, 2013. In 19 appearances for the Triple-A Omaha Storm Chasers, he compiled a 1–2 record and 3.55 ERA with 36 strikeouts across 38 innings of work. On February 17, 2014, Cleto was designated for assignment by the Royals.

=== Chicago White Sox ===
On February 26, 2014, Cleto was claimed off waivers by the Chicago White Sox. Cleto was designated for assignment on May 10, to make room for Frank Francisco on the roster. He cleared waivers and was sent outright to the Triple-A Charlotte Knights on May 12, and was selected back to the active roster on August 4. In 28 appearances out of the bullpen, Cleto compiled a 4.60 ERA with 32 strikeouts across 29 1/3 innings pitched.

On April 3, 2015, Cleto was removed from the 40-man roster and sent outright to Triple-A Charlotte. In 31 games for Charlotte, he registered a 3–2 record and 3.00 ERA with 61 strikeouts and 5 saves across 51 innings pitched.

On February 2, 2016, the White Sox re-signed Cleto to a minor league contract. He was released prior to the start of the season on March 31.

=== Vaqueros Laguna ===
On May 30, 2016, Cleto signed with the Vaqueros Laguna of the Mexican League. In 14 relief outings for Laguna, he posted an 0–1 record and 1.29 ERA with 16 strikeouts across 14 innings pitched. Cleto was released by the team on July 1.

=== Atlanta Braves ===
On July 3, 2016, Cleto signed a minor league contract with the Atlanta Braves organization. He was assigned to the Triple-A Gwinnett Braves, where he made 20 appearances and registered a 2.14 ERA with 31 strikeouts and 4 saves in 21 innings pitched. He elected free agency following the season on November 7.

=== Vaqueros Unión Laguna ===
On December 13, 2016, Cleto signed a minor league contract with the Chicago Cubs. He was released on March 13, 2017.

On April 24, 2017, Cleto signed with the Vaqueros Unión Laguna of the Mexican League. In 19 appearances for the Vaqueros, Cleto logged a 1–2 record and 3.20 ERA with 18 strikeouts and four saves across 19 2/3 innings pitched.

On June 20, 2017, Cleto, Edgar Osuna, and Ricky Alvarez were traded to the Leones de Yucatán in exchange for Alejandro Martínez, Francisco Esparragoza, Leo Rosales, and Tomás Solís. However, Cleto did not appear for Yucatán following his acquisition.

=== Algodoneros de Unión Laguna ===
On March 19, 2018, Cleto was traded back to the Algodoneros de Unión Laguna of the Mexican League. He made 36 total appearances for the team, registering a 3–3 record with 17 saves and 38 strikeouts.

=== Leones de Yucatán (second stint) ===
On July 17, 2018, Cleto was traded back to the Leones de Yucatán. In 25 appearances for the Leones, he compiled a 2–1 record and 3.08 ERA with 31 strikeouts across 26 1/3 innings pitched.

Cleto made 16 appearances for Yucatán in 2019, but struggled to an 0–1 record and 9.22 ERA with 16 strikeouts over 13 2/3 innings of work.

=== Toros de Tijuana ===
On May 18, 2019, Cleto was loaned to the Toros de Tijuana of the Mexican League. He made 11 appearances for the Toros, but struggled to a 13.50 ERA with eight strikeouts across six innings of work.

=== Rieleros de Aguascalientes ===
On July 1, 2019, Cleto was loaned to the Rieleros de Aguascalientes of the Mexican League. Cleto made 26 appearances for Aguascalientes down the stretch, compiling a 2–1 record and 5.93 ERA with 43 strikeouts across 30 1/3 innings pitched.

=== Algodoneros de Unión Laguna (second stint) ===
On February 27, 2020, Cleto signed with the Piratas de Campeche. However, he did not play in a game in 2020 due to the cancellation of the LMB season because of the COVID-19 pandemic.

On April 7, 2021, Cleto signed with the Algodoneros de Unión Laguna. In seven appearances for the Algodoneros, he struggled to an 0–1 record and 14.40 ERA with four strikeouts across five innings. On October 20, Cleto was traded back to the Toros de Tijuana. However, he was released prior to the start of the season on March 1, 2022.

== Pitching style ==
Cleto is a hard-thrower, wielding a four-seam fastball at 96–99 mph. The fastball is by far his most used pitch, but he also throws three off-speed pitches: a changeup (89–91) to lefties, a slider (84–86) to righties, and a curveball (79–82) to hitters from both sides of the plate.
