= Mike Carp =

American baseball player (born 1986)

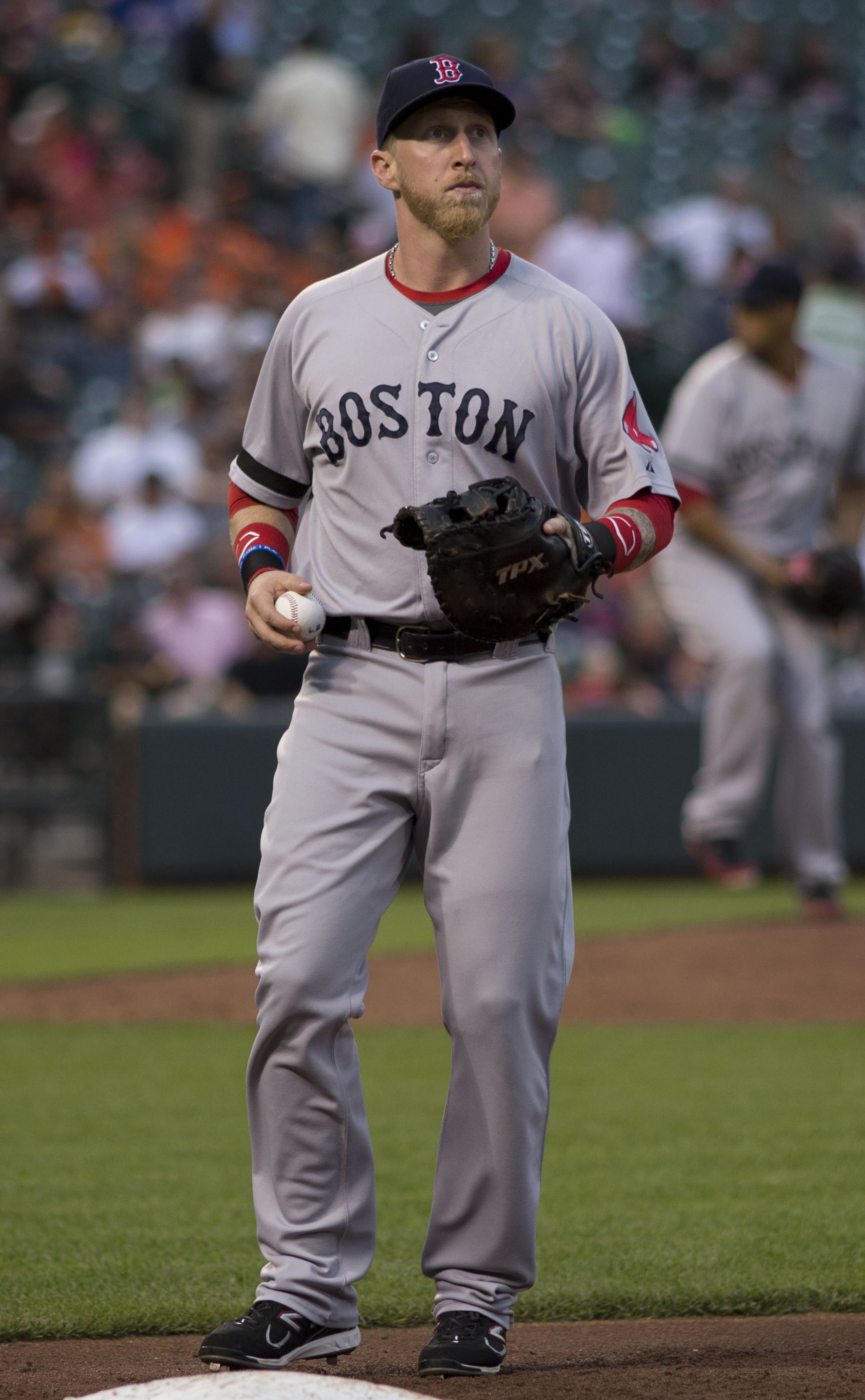
- Carp with the Boston Red Sox in 2013
- First baseman / Left fielder
- Born: June 30, 1986 (age 39); Long Beach, California, U.S.
- Batted: Left Threw: Right

MLB debut
- June 17, 2009, for the Seattle Mariners

Last MLB appearance
- August 28, 2014, for the Texas Rangers

MLB statistics
- Batting average: .254
- Home runs: 27
- Runs batted in: 127
- Stats at Baseball Reference

Teams
- Seattle Mariners (2009–2012); Boston Red Sox (2013–2014); Texas Rangers (2014)

Career highlights and awards
- World Series champion (2013)

Christopher Michael Carp (born June 30, 1986) is an American former professional baseball first baseman and left fielder. He played in Major League Baseball (MLB) for the Seattle Mariners, Boston Red Sox and Texas Rangers.

== Professional career ==
=== New York Mets ===
After attending Lakewood High School in Lakewood, California, Carp was drafted by the Mets in the ninth round of the 2004 Major League Baseball draft (254th overall). He hit 19 Home runs in only 313 at bats as a 19-year-old playing with the Hagerstown Suns, and won the Sterling Award as Mets organization player of the year following his 2006 season with the St. Lucie Mets. In that season he hit .287 (141-491) with 69 runs scored, 27 doubles, one triple, 17 home runs and 88 runs batted in.

In March 2007 he attended Major League training camp for the first time, hitting .233 in 43 at bats with the Mets. His 2007 season with the Binghamton Mets of the Double-A Eastern League would be somewhat derailed by a broken finger, which he felt affected his swing even after returning from the disabled list. Carp hit .251/.337/.387/.725 (90 for 359, 55 runs, 16 2b, 11 HR, 48 RBI, 39/75 BB/K) with Binghamton. He played with the Scottsdale Scorpions of the Arizona Fall League during the fall.

Carp enjoyed a great bounceback season in 2008, setting career highs in average, on-base percentage, OPS, doubles, homers, and walks. For the season, Carp hit .299/.403/.471/.874 (143 for 478, 67 runs, 29 2b, 3b, 17 HR, 72 RBI, 79/88 BB/K).

=== Seattle Mariners ===
On December 10, 2008, Carp was traded to the Seattle Mariners in a three-team trade which also included RHP J. J. Putz, RHP Sean Green and OF Jeremy Reed from the Mariners for RHP Aaron Heilman, OF Endy Chávez, LHP Jason Vargas, OF Ezequiel Carrera and RHP Maikel Cleto and sent RHP Joe Smith to the Indians.

He made his major league debut with the Mariners on June 17, 2009, pinch-hitting in a game against the San Diego Padres and drawing a walk. He got a hit, a single to center in his first major league start the next day.

On September 1, Carp was called up a second time. He went 0 for 4 against the Los Angeles Angels that same night.

On June 8, 2011, Carp was called up to replace outfielder Mike Wilson. He has also served as a replacement at the first base position for starter Justin Smoak. Carp was named the American League Rookie of the Month in August, during which he had a 20-game hitting streak, batting .313 and driving in 25 runs.

On September 19, 2011, Carp hit his first grand slam against the Cleveland Indians at Progressive Field.

=== Boston Red Sox ===
On February 20, 2013, Carp was acquired by the Boston Red Sox for a player to be named later or cash considerations. He made his Red Sox debut on April 7 versus the Toronto Blue Jays.

On June 4, 2013, Carp earned his first career ejection for arguing a strike three call made by umpire Andy Fletcher.

On September 11, 2013, Carp hit a go-ahead grand slam to dead center off pitcher Roberto Hernandez of the Tampa Bay Rays to put ahead the Red Sox and eventually win the game in the 10th inning.

Carp served as a backup first baseman, outfielder, and pinch hitter for the 2013 Red Sox, appearing in 86 regular season games and six postseason games as the team won the 2013 World Series.

On April 24, 2014, in the ninth inning against the Yankees at Fenway Park, Carp appeared as a relief pitcher after the Red Sox had used all their relievers. Carp pitched one inning, allowing five bases on balls and one earned run.

Shortly after the All-Star break, Carp requested that the Red Sox trade him. The request made news after the Red Sox traded veteran pitcher Jake Peavy to the San Francisco Giants on July 26. Carp was designated for assignment by the Red Sox on August 1.

=== Texas Rangers ===
Carp was claimed on waivers by the Texas Rangers on August 3, 2014. On August 30, the Rangers designated Carp for assignment. He elected free agency in October 2014.

=== Washington Nationals ===
On January 13, 2015, Carp signed a minor league deal with the Washington Nationals. He declined a minor league assignment in early April, and became a free agent.

=== Los Angeles Dodgers ===
On April 25, 2015, he signed a minor league contract with the Los Angeles Dodgers and was assigned to the Triple-A Oklahoma City Dodgers. He had only two hits in 22 at-bats for Oklahoma City and was released on May 7.

=== Baltimore Orioles ===
On March 4, 2016, the Baltimore Orioles signed Carp to a minor league deal, pending a physical. He was released on April 1, 2016.

=== New Britain Bees ===
On July 12, 2019, Carp signed with the New Britain Bees of the independent Atlantic League of Professional Baseball. In 58 games he hit .260/.333/.395 with 6 home runs, 39 RBIs and 1 stolen base.

=== High Point Rockers ===
On November 6, 2019, Carp was selected by the High Point Rockers in the New Britain Bees dispersal draft. He did not play a game for the team because of the cancellation of the 2020 ALPB season due to the COVID-19 pandemic and became a free agent after the year. On April 6, 2021, Carp re-signed with the Rockers for the 2021 season. However, he did not make the team out of spring and was released prior to the season.
