= Mark Lowe =

American baseball player (born 1983)

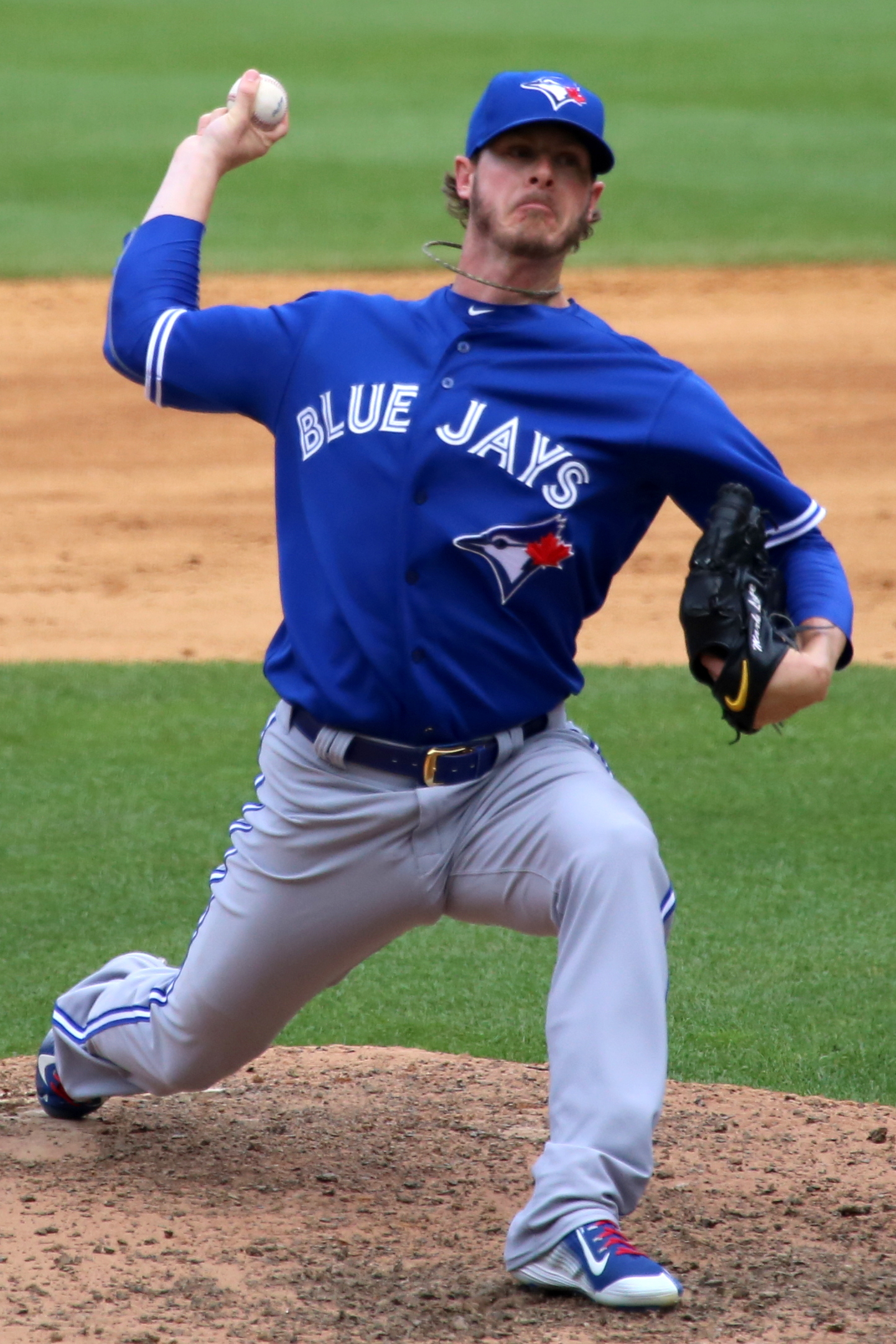
- Lowe with the Toronto Blue Jays
- Pitcher
- Born: June 7, 1983 (age 43); Houston, Texas, U.S.
- Batted: Left Threw: Right

MLB debut
- July 7, 2006, for the Seattle Mariners

Last MLB appearance
- September 23, 2016, for the Detroit Tigers

MLB statistics
- Win–loss record: 10–27
- Earned run average: 4.22
- Strikeouts: 352
- Stats at Baseball Reference

Teams
- Seattle Mariners (2006–2010); Texas Rangers (2010–2012); Los Angeles Angels of Anaheim (2013); Cleveland Indians (2014); Seattle Mariners (2015); Toronto Blue Jays (2015); Detroit Tigers (2016)

Mark Christopher Lowe (born June 7, 1983) is an American former professional baseball pitcher. He played in Major League Baseball (MLB) for the Seattle Mariners, Texas Rangers, Los Angeles Angels of Anaheim, Cleveland Indians, Toronto Blue Jays, and Detroit Tigers. His fastball has been clocked as high as 101 mph. He also throws a slider and a circle changeup.

== College career ==
Lowe attended the University of Texas at Arlington. He also pitched for the Wisconsin Woodchucks in the 2002 and 2003 summer seasons and was a part of their championship team in 2003.

== Professional career ==
=== Seattle Mariners ===
Lowe was drafted by the Seattle Mariners in the fifth round of the 2004 MLB draft and began his career with the Everett AquaSox of the Class-A Northwest League. In 22 starts with the Wisconsin Timber Rattlers in 2005, he made 22 starts and was 6–6 with a 5.47 ERA. He proceeded to play for the Inland Empire 66ers of San Bernardino and San Antonio Missions in 2006.

==== 2006 ====
He made his Major League debut for the Seattle Mariners on July 7, 2006, in relief against the Detroit Tigers, loading the bases before striking out the side. He opened his career by throwing 17 2/3 scoreless innings. He picked up his first win on July 19 against the New York Yankees. Lowe was placed on the disabled list on August 20 with right elbow tendinitis and was later transferred to the 60-day disabled list. He underwent arthroscopic surgery on his elbow after the season.

==== 2007 ====
Lowe was placed on 60-Day disabled list on April 1 and began a rehabilitation assignment on July 3 with the Triple-A Tacoma Rainiers. He also made rehab appearances for the Short Season Everett AquaSox and the West Tenn Diamond Jaxx before being activated on July 24, He was 0–0, with a 6.75 ERA in four relief appearances, during his seven rehab appearances in West Tennessee, Everett and Tacoma. He was optioned to Tacoma on August 9 to make room on the roster for John Parrish. He was recalled from Tacoma and placed on 15-day DL on August 28. He was rated by Baseball America as the Mariners number 8 prospect heading into the 2008 season.

==== 2008–2009 ====
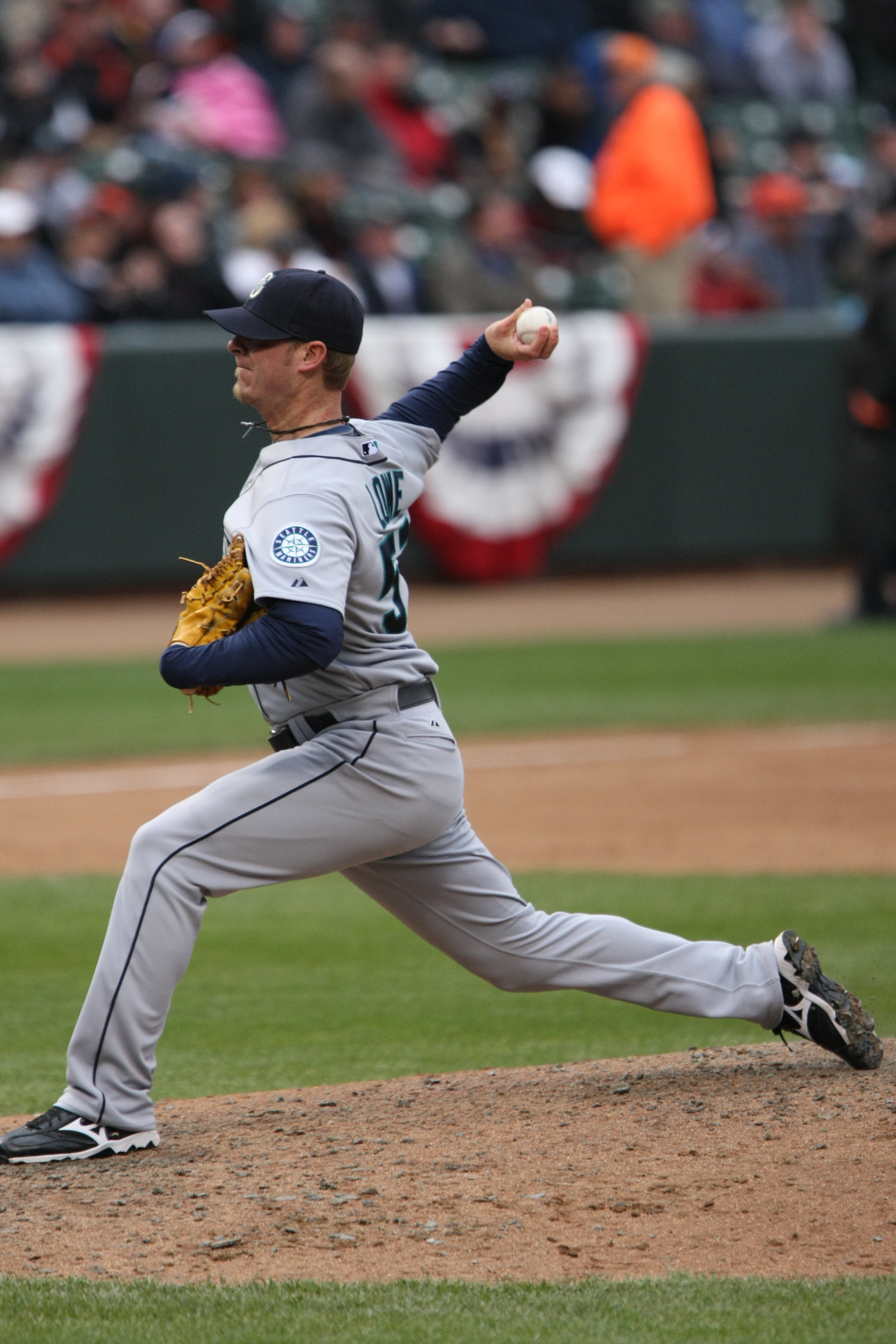
Lowe pitching for the Seattle Mariners in 2008

In 2008 Lowe set career-highs in games (57), innings (63.2), and strikeouts (55). Among Mariners relievers, he ranked second in games, third in innings and third in strikeouts. He was 0–2, with a 3.60 ERA at home, the 6th-lowest home ERA by a reliever in the American League. He began the season by making 12 scoreless relief appearances in his first 13 games. Lowe recorded a 0.55 ERA by allowing just one run in 16.1 innings from March 31 to June 13. He tossed at least 2 innings in 12 of his 57 appearances.

He recorded his first Major League save April 11 against the Los Angeles Angels. Lowe was optioned to Tacoma on August 25, but did not make an appearance. He was recalled on September 2.

=== Texas Rangers ===
==== 2010 ====
On July 9, 2010, Lowe was traded to the Texas Rangers with Cliff Lee for Justin Smoak and prospects Blake Beavan, Josh Lueke and Matt Lawson. He made his debut for the Rangers on September 29, 2010, against Seattle, coming back from injury to throw a scoreless inning against his former team.

==== 2011 ====
Lowe was included on the Rangers postseason roster for 2011 after posting an ERA of 3.80 in 52 games. He was on the mound when David Freese hit the walk off home run to end Game 6 of the 2011 World Series.

==== 2012 ====
He appeared in 36 games in 2012, with a 3.43 ERA. He became a free agent following the season.

=== Los Angeles Angels ===
On February 8, 2013, he signed a minor league contract with the Los Angeles Dodgers that included an invitation to spring training. The Dodgers released him on March 24 and he signed another minor league contract, this time with the Los Angeles Angels on March 27. He had his contract selected to the major league roster on March 30. He was designated for assignment on May 29, and released on June 6.

=== Washington Nationals ===
On June 12, 2013, the Washington Nationals signed Lowe to a minor league contract and assigned him to the Syracuse Chiefs of the Triple-A International League. He was released on September 2.

=== Tampa Bay Rays ===
On November 19, 2013, Lowe signed a minor league contract with the Tampa Bay Rays. He was released on March 26, 2014.

=== Cleveland Indians ===
On March 31, 2014, Lowe signed a minor league contract with the Cleveland Indians. He was called up to the majors from the Triple-A Columbus Clippers on May 22. He was designated for assignment on July 8, and assigned outright to Columbus on July 12. Lowe elected free agency on October 12, 2014.

=== Seattle Mariners (second stint) ===
On December 18, 2014, the Seattle Mariners signed Lowe to a minor league contract with an invitation to spring training. He had his contract selected to the major league roster on May 4, 2015. Before he was traded, Lowe had pitched 36 innings in 34 appearances out of the bullpen for the Mariners, with an ERA of 1.00.

=== Toronto Blue Jays ===
On July 31, 2015, Lowe was traded to the Toronto Blue Jays for Rob Rasmussen, Jake Brentz, and Nick Wells. Over the last two months of 2015, Lowe pitched 19 innings of relief for Toronto, compiling a 3.79 ERA. His combined totals for 2015 (with Seattle and Toronto) were: 55 innings, 1–3 record, 13 games finished, and a 1.96 ERA. He became a free agent following the season.

=== Detroit Tigers ===
On December 8, 2015, the Detroit Tigers signed Lowe to a two-year, $11 million contract. Lowe struggled in his first season with the Tigers, pitching to a 7.11 ERA in 49 1/3 innings.

He was released on March 26, 2017.

=== Seattle Mariners (third stint) ===
On April 1, 2017, Lowe signed a minor league contract with the Seattle Mariners.

=== Chicago White Sox ===
On July 24, 2017, Lowe was traded to the Chicago White Sox, along with fellow veteran pitcher Jean Machi, and assigned to the Triple–A Charlotte Knights. He was released on August 21.

On January 27, 2018, Lowe signed a minor league contract with the Los Angeles Dodgers. However, he was released prior to the start of the season on March 12.

=== Sugar Land Skeeters ===
On April 15, 2019, Lowe signed with the Sugar Land Skeeters of the Atlantic League of Professional Baseball. In 14 appearances for the Skeeters, he struggled to an 8.35 ERA with 21 strikeouts over 18 1/3 innings pitched. Lowe became a free agent following the season.

== Personal life ==
Lowe played High School Baseball at Fort Bend Baptist Academy in Sugar Land, Texas. Lowe was diagnosed with diabetes in 2008. Although initially he was diagnosed as a Type 2 diabetic, his diagnosis was changed to Type 1 before the 2009 season.

Mark married Stephanie Morgan on December 4, 2010.
