= Josh Lueke =

American baseball player (born 1984)

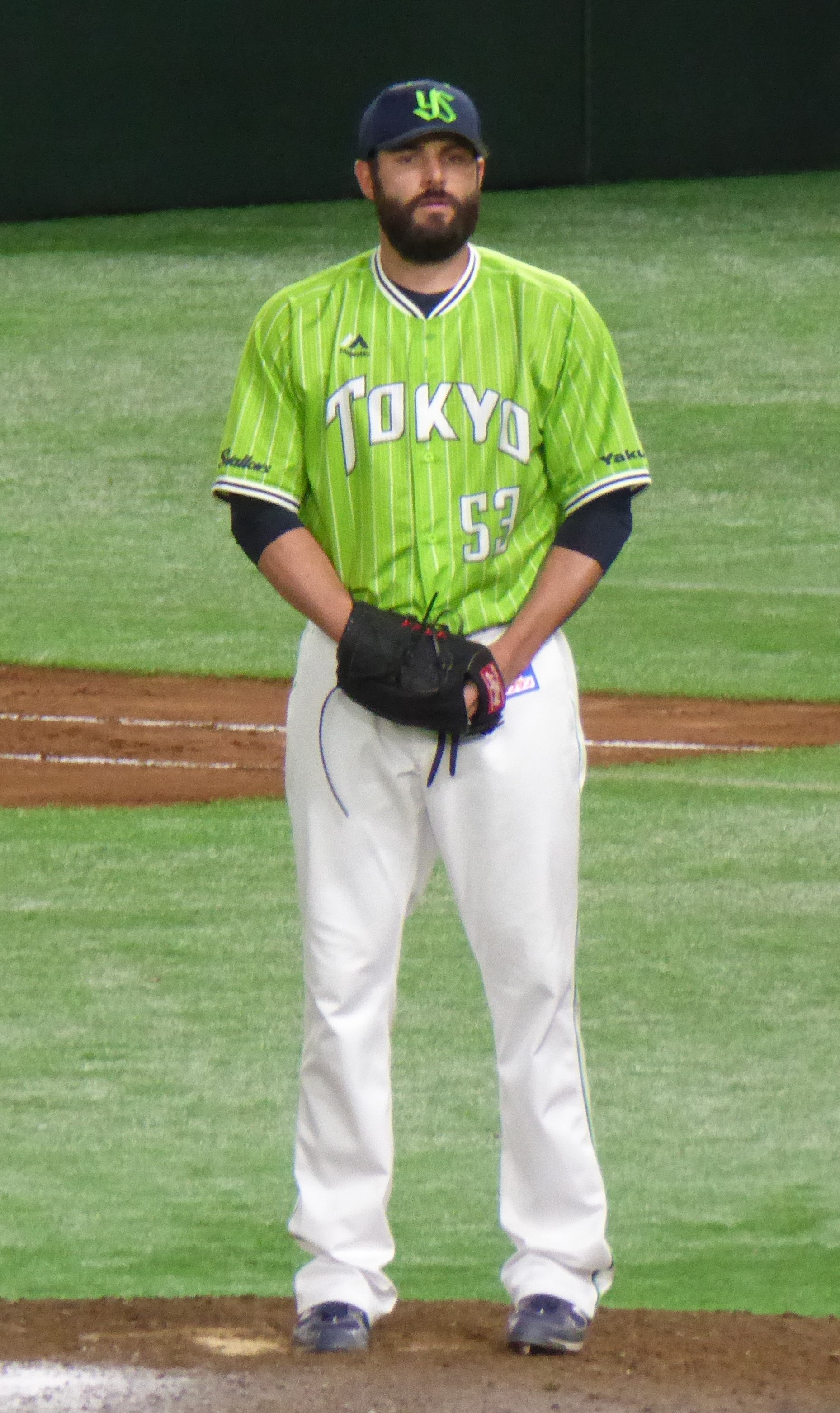
- Lueke with the Tokyo Yakult Swallows
- Relief pitcher
- Born: December 5, 1984 (age 41); Covington, Kentucky, U.S.
- Batted: Right Threw: Right

Professional debut
- MLB: April 3, 2011, for the Seattle Mariners
- NPB: March 27, 2016, for the Tokyo Yakult Swallows

Last appearance
- MLB: June 5, 2014, for the Tampa Bay Rays
- NPB: September 30, 2017, for the Tokyo Yakult Swallows

MLB statistics
- Win–loss record: 2–5
- Earned run average: 6.16
- Strikeouts: 75

NPB statistics
- Win–loss record: 10–12
- Earned run average: 3.02
- Strikeouts: 130
- Stats at Baseball Reference

Teams
- Seattle Mariners (2011); Tampa Bay Rays (2012–2014); Tokyo Yakult Swallows (2016–2017)

Joshua William Lueke (LOO-kee; born December 5, 1984) is an American former professional baseball relief pitcher. He played in Major League Baseball (MLB) for the Seattle Mariners and Tampa Bay Rays, and in Nippon Professional Baseball (NPB) for the Tokyo Yakult Swallows.

== Baseball career ==
=== Amateur career ===
Lueke attended Scott High School in Covington, Kentucky, and was a pitcher and middle infielder on the school's baseball team. He began playing college baseball at St. Catharine College, growing six inches before his freshman year. He transferred to play for the Northern Kentucky Norse.

=== Texas Rangers ===
Lueke was drafted by the Texas Rangers in the 16th round of the 2007 MLB draft. He played for the Spokane Indians, Clinton LumberKings, and Bakersfield Blaze in 2007 and 2008. He only pitched in four games in 2009 and was suspended by the Rangers following his arrest in April.

=== Seattle Mariners ===
On July 9, 2010, Texas traded Lueke along with Justin Smoak and fellow prospects Matt Lawson and Blake Beavan to Seattle for pitchers Cliff Lee and Mark Lowe.

On April 3, 2011, Lueke made his major league debut for the Mariners against the Oakland Athletics. He threw 2/3 of an inning, giving up four runs on two hits and two walks, recording both outs via strikeout. He pitched in 25 games in his rookie season, with a 1–1 record and 6.06 earned run average (ERA).

=== Tampa Bay Rays ===
On November 27, 2011, Lueke and a player to be named later were traded to the Tampa Bay Rays for John Jaso.

On March 16, 2013, the Rays optioned Lueke to their Triple-A team, the Durham Bulls. On May 10, Lueke was recalled to join the Rays. He pitched 1 1/3 innings in his season debut against the San Diego Padres, striking out two. Lueke was recalled by the Rays on September 1.

Lueke was designated for assignment on June 7, 2014. He cleared waivers and was outrighted to Triple-A on June 9.

=== Foreign and independent leagues ===
On February 4, 2015, Lueke signed with the Delfines del Carmen of the Mexican Baseball League.

Lueke played with the Tokyo Yakult Swallows of Nippon Professional Baseball in 2016 and 2017.

On March 22, 2018, Lueke signed with the Generales de Durango of the Mexican League. On April 21, Lueke was traded to the Acereros de Monclova. He was a league all-star that season.

On February 26, 2019, Lueke was traded to the Pericos de Puebla. He was released on May 22. On May 27, Lueke signed with the Long Island Ducks of the Atlantic League. On June 27, his contract was purchased by the Leones de Yucatán of the Mexican League.

Lueke did not play in a game in 2020 due to the cancellation of the Mexican League season because of the COVID-19 pandemic.

In 2021, Lueke posted a 2.17 ERA and earned 12 saves for Yucatán, operating as the team's closer. He became a free agent following the season.

On January 13, 2022, Lueke signed with the Algodoneros de Unión Laguna of the Mexican League for the 2022 season. The Algodoneros released Lueke on September 23. He finished with the second-most saves in the league for the season, with 22. In August, Lueke informed Algodoneros general manager Francisco "Chipper" Méndez that he would retire following the winter league season of the Mexican Pacific League. Lueke signed with the Charros de Jalisco on August 2. He also pitched for Jalisco in the 2023–24 season.

== Legal history ==
While in the Rangers organization, Lueke was arrested in April 2009 in Bakersfield, California, following a May 2008 incident and charged with committing rape and non-consensual sodomy. During the investigation, Lueke lied to the police by denying he had sexual contact with the victim, a claim proven false by DNA testing. He pleaded no contest to lesser charges of false imprisonment with violence and was sentenced to 42 days in jail, time served prior to making bail. An additional 20 days were discounted due to good behavior, and Lueke received three years of felony probation.

After Lueke was traded to Seattle, Mariners president Chuck Armstrong denied having any knowledge of Lueke's criminal past, and stated if he had known, he would have stopped the deal with Texas. Up to that point, the Mariners organization had a long history of supporting groups who oppose violence against women, running a campaign called "Refuse to Abuse" and had previously suspended and traded reliever Julio Mateo, who was accused of beating his wife. After an interview with Lueke, Mariners general manager (GM) Jack Zduriencik reported that he was "satisfied with the interview and it's an issue that's behind us." Mariners pitching coach Rick Adair later told reporters that he had informed Zduriencik of Lueke's legal troubles, and that Rangers GM Jon Daniels had made a standing offer to take Lueke back on the night of the trade. Adair had been the Rangers minor league pitching coordinator in 2008, when Lueke was charged.

At the end of his probation, Lueke said the incident was a "freak accident kind of thing" and that he did not worry about what other people would think. During his tenure in MLB, some people regularly posted about Lueke's arrest on social media when he pitched.
