= Trayvon Robinson =

American baseball player (born 1987)

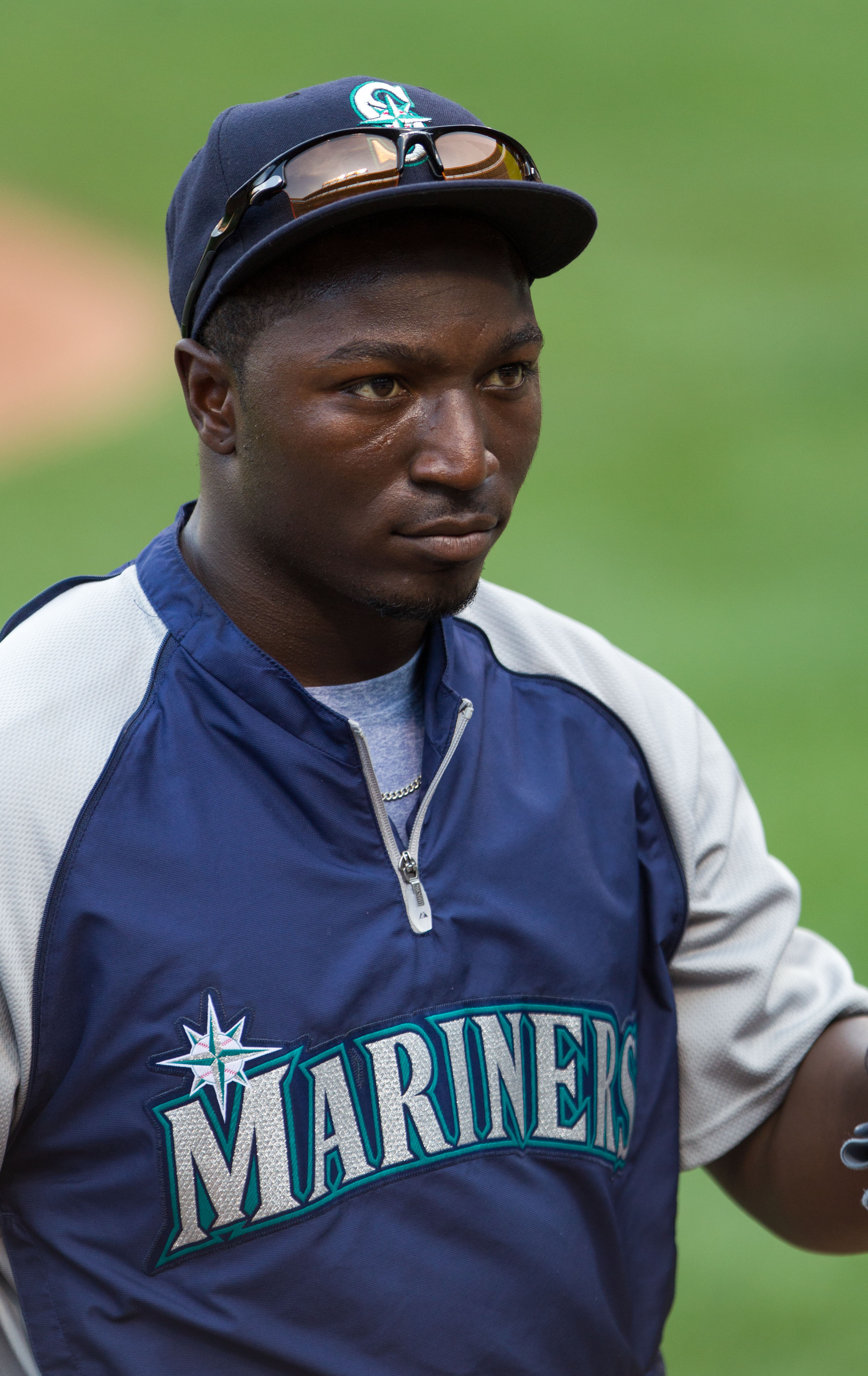
- Robinson with the Seattle Mariners

Lancaster Stormers
- Left fielder / Hitting coach
- Born: September 1, 1987 (age 38); Los Angeles, California, U.S.
- Batted: Switch Threw: Right

MLB debut
- August 5, 2011, for the Seattle Mariners

Last MLB appearance
- October 3, 2012, for the Seattle Mariners

MLB statistics
- Batting average: .215
- Home runs: 5
- Runs batted in: 26
- Stats at Baseball Reference

Teams
- Seattle Mariners (2011–2012)

Trayvon Andrew Dwayne Robinson (born September 1, 1987) is an American former professional baseball left fielder and current hitting coach for the Lancaster Stormers of the Atlantic League of Professional Baseball. He has previously played in Major League Baseball (MLB) for the Seattle Mariners in 2011 and 2012.

== Professional career ==
=== Los Angeles Dodgers ===
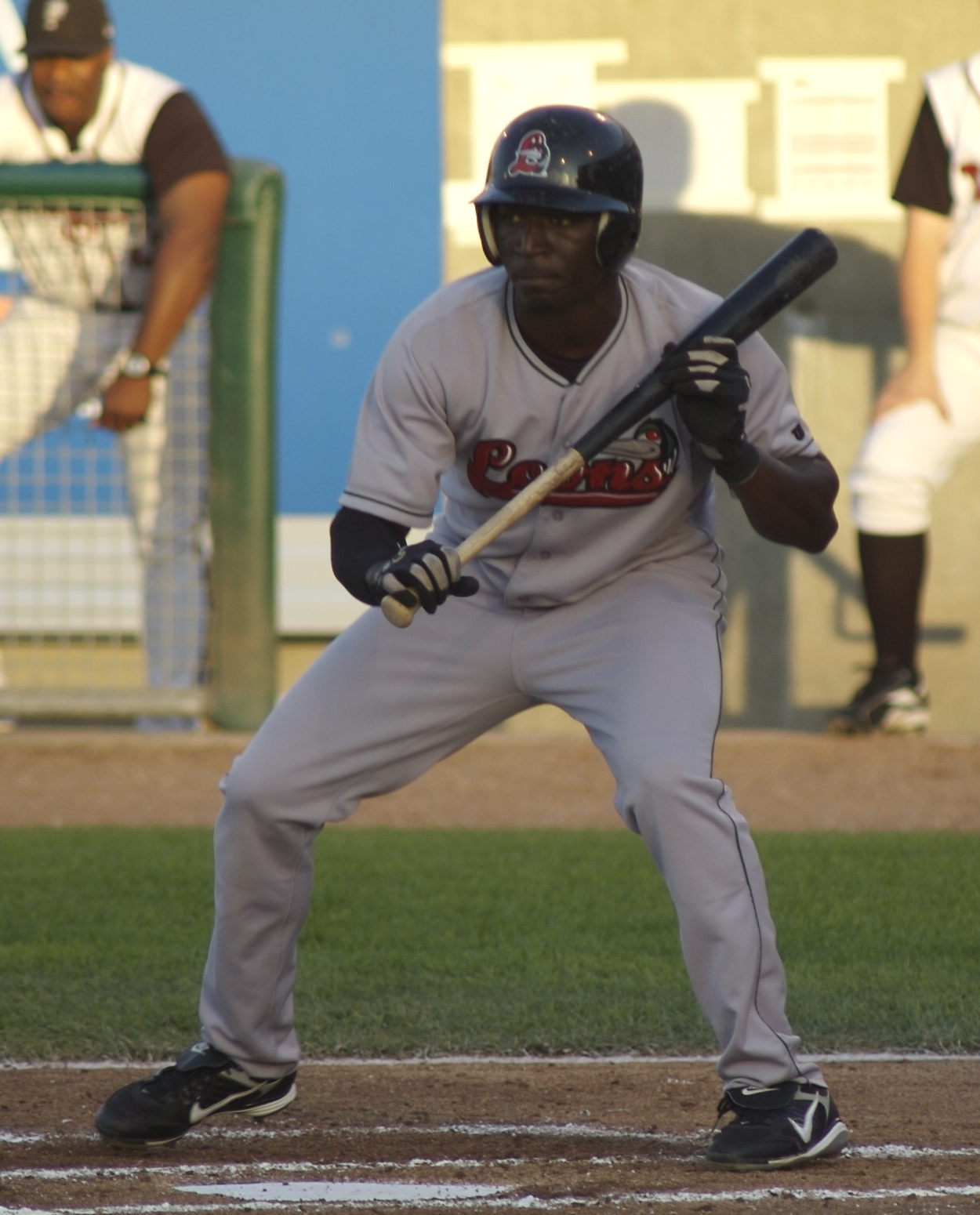
Robinson with the Great Lakes Loons in 2007.

Robinson was drafted in the 10th round of the 2005 MLB draft by the Los Angeles Dodgers out of Crenshaw High School in Los Angeles.

After two seasons with the Gulf Coast Dodgers and one with the Vero Beach Dodgers, he was promoted in 2007 with the Single–A Great Lakes Loons. In 2009 with the High–A Inland Empire 66ers of San Bernardino, he hit .306 with 15 home runs and 43 stolen bases. He was selected to the midseason California League All-Star team. He was added to the Dodgers 40-man roster in 2009. In 2010, he was assigned to the Chattanooga Lookouts in the Double-A Southern League. With the Lookouts, he was selected to the Southern League All-Star Game. He appeared in 120 games in 2010, hitting .300, with nine home runs, 57 runs batted in (RBIs) and 38 steals. At the conclusion of the season, he appeared for the Phoenix Desert Dogs in the Arizona Fall League and was selected to appear in the AFL "Rising Stars" game. He was assigned to the Triple-A Albuquerque Isotopes for 2011, where he was selected to the Pacific Coast League mid-season all-star team. He also competed in the Triple-A Home Run Derby. He hit .293 for the Isotopes in 100 games with 26 home runs.

=== Seattle Mariners ===
On July 31, 2011, Robinson was traded to the Seattle Mariners in a three-team trade that sent Érik Bédard to the Boston Red Sox. He made his major league debut with the Mariners on August 5, starting in left field against the Los Angeles Angels of Anaheim, and robbed Torii Hunter of a two-run home run. He recorded his first major league hit, a single to left off Jered Weaver, in his second at-bat. His first major league home run was scored the next day, in the seventh inning against Angels pitcher Tyler Chatwood. He played in 90 Major League games for the Mariners in 2011 and 2012 and hit .215 with 5 homers and 26 RBI.

=== Baltimore Orioles ===
On November 20, 2012, Robinson was traded to the Baltimore Orioles in exchange for Robert Andino. He was designated for assignment following the acquisition of Todd Redmond on February 8, 2013. He cleared waivers and was sent outright to the Triple–A Norfolk Tides on February 14. In 107 games split between Norfolk and the Double–A Bowie Baysox, Robinson slashed .247/.329/.394 with 11 home runs, 43 RBI, and 21 stolen bases.

=== Los Angeles Dodgers (second stint) ===
On January 24, 2014, Robinson signed a minor league contract to return to the Los Angeles Dodgers organization. He played in 117 games for the Triple–A Albuquerque Isotopes with a .235 batting average, six home runs and 30 RBI.

=== Arizona Diamondbacks ===
On December 15, 2014, Robinson signed a minor league contract with the San Diego Padres. He was released prior to the start of the season on April 2, 2015. On April 13, Robinson signed with the Long Island Ducks of the Atlantic League of Professional Baseball.

However, on April 20, Robinson signed a minor league contract with the Arizona Diamondbacks. He was subsequently assigned him to their Triple–A affiliate, the Reno Aces, for whom he batted .276/.357/.448 with two home runs and nine RBI over 37 games. Robinson was released by the Diamondbacks organization on June 22.

=== Detroit Tigers ===
On July 3, 2015, the Detroit Tigers signed Robinson to a minor league contract. In 49 games for the Triple–A Toledo Mud Hens, he batted .211/.322/.263 with one home run, nine RBI, and 11 stolen bases.

=== Somerset Patriots ===
Robinson signed with the Somerset Patriots of the Atlantic League of Professional Baseball for the 2016 season. In 64 games for Somerset, he hit .235/.296/.401 with nine home runs and 28 RBI.

=== Lancaster Barnstormers ===
On July 22, 2016, Robinson signed with the Lancaster Barnstormers of the Atlantic League of Professional Baseball. He re-signed with the club for the 2017 & 2018 seasons. He became a free agent following the 2018 season where he hit .295/.382/.442 with 7 home runs and 49 RBIs.

=== Pittsburgh Pirates ===
On March 5, 2019, Robinson signed a minor league contract with the Pittsburgh Pirates organization. On July 6, he was named to the International League All-Star roster for the 32nd Triple-A All-Star Game. In 92 games for the Triple–A Indianapolis Indians, Robinson hit .297/.381/.453 with seven home runs, 36 RBI, and six stolen bases. He elected free agency following the season on November 4.

=== Chicago White Sox ===
On January 17, 2020, Robinson signed a minor league deal with the Chicago White Sox organization. He did not play in a game in 2020 due to the cancellation of the minor league season because of the COVID-19 pandemic. Robinson was released by the White Sox on June 18.

=== Lancaster Barnstormers (second stint) ===
On April 15, 2021, Robinson signed with the Lancaster Barnstormers of the Atlantic League of Professional Baseball. In 94 games with the Barnstormers, Robinson hit .235/.353/.364 with 8 home runs, 46 RBI, and 12 stolen bases. He became a free agent following the season.

Robinson re-signed with Lancaster for the 2022 season on June 3, 2022, and played in 88 games, hitting .287/.374/.441 with 9 home runs and 51 RBI. With Lancaster, he won the Atlantic League championship.

On February 15, 2023, Robinson re-signed with the Barnstormers for the 2023 season. In 96 games for Lancaster, he batted .269/.403/.435 with 9 home runs, 52 RBI, and 8 stolen bases. Robinson won his second straight Atlantic League championship with Lancaster in 2023.

On April 11, 2024, Robinson re–signed with Lancaster for a fourth consecutive season. He was additionally announced as the team's hitting coach entering the year. In 4 games for the team, Robinson went 1–for–13 (.077) with no home runs, one RBI, and one stolen base. He became a free agent following the season.

== Coaching career ==
In 2025, Robinson retired and officially became the full-time hitting coach of the Lancaster Stormers of the Atlantic League of Professional Baseball.
