= Blake Beavan =

American baseball player (born 1989)

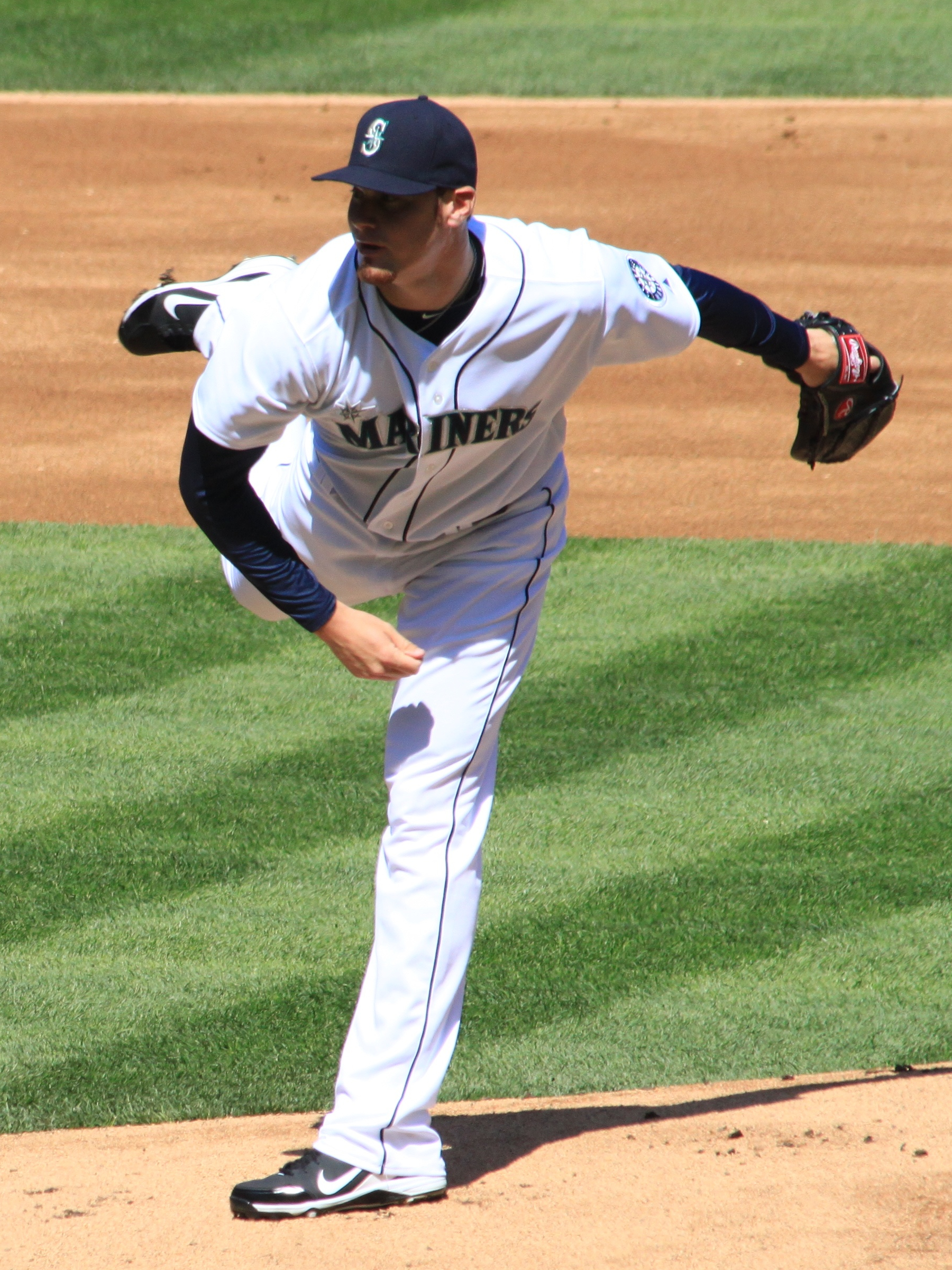
- Beavan with the Seattle Mariners in 2012
- Starting Pitcher
- Born: January 17, 1989 (age 37); Irving, Texas, U.S.
- Batted: Right Threw: Right

MLB debut
- July 3, 2011, for the Seattle Mariners

Last MLB appearance
- April 15, 2014, for the Seattle Mariners

MLB statistics
- Win–loss record: 16–20
- Earned run average: 4.61
- Strikeouts: 137
- Stats at Baseball Reference

Teams
- Seattle Mariners (2011–2014)
Medals
Men's baseball
Representing United States
World Youth Baseball Championship
Silver medal – second place	2005 Mexico	Team
World Junior Baseball Championship
Silver medal – second place	2006 Sancti Spíritus	Team

Blake William Beavan (born January 17, 1989) is an American former professional baseball pitcher who played for the Seattle Mariners of Major League Baseball (MLB) from 2011 to 2014. A first-round draft pick in the 2007 MLB draft by the Texas Rangers, Beavan was traded to Seattle in 2010 in a package of prospects for pitcher Cliff Lee.

== Early life ==
Beavan began playing baseball at the age of 5 in the Irving Boys Baseball Association.

== Career ==
=== Amateur career ===
Beavan attended Irving High School in Irving, Texas. He was voted the district's freshman of the year in 2004. In 2006, his junior season, he led Irving to the playoffs for the first time since 1999. He had the lowest earned run average (ERA), 0.36, in Class 5A. That year, he played for the United States junior national baseball team and competed in the 2006 World Junior Baseball Championship. He also won Baseball America's 2006 Youth Player of the Year award, as the United States won the silver medal.

In 2007, his senior season in high school, Beavan compiled a 9–2 win–loss record, a 0.19 ERA, and 139 strikeouts in 73 innings pitched, allowing only two earned runs in 11 starts. He threw a perfect game in March 2007. In recognition of his achievements, Beavan was named 2007 Texas high school player of the year. Beavan committed to attend Navarro College, a junior college in Corsicana, Texas, where he intended to play college baseball.

=== Texas Rangers ===
Heading into the 2007 Major League Baseball draft, Beavan was considered a top prospect, with the ability to throw his fastball at 94 miles per hour (151 km/h) consistently, and as fast as 98 miles per hour (158 km/h). The Texas Rangers selected Beavan in the first round, with the 17th overall selection. He was one of three high school pitchers chosen by the Rangers in the first round of the draft. Beavan signed with the Rangers, foregoing college, for a signing bonus of $1.5 million. In his first professional season, Beavan had a 10–6 record and a 2.37 ERA in 23 games started for the Clinton LumberKings of the Class-A Midwest League. By 2009, Beavan pitched for the Bakersfield Blaze of the Class-A Advanced California League. He was promoted to the Frisco RoughRiders of the Class-AA Texas League in June 2009.

In 2010, Beavan had a 10–5 record and a 2.78 ERA in 17 games started at for Frisco, where he was named the Rangers' Minor League Pitcher of the Month for May. He received a promotion to the Oklahoma City RedHawks of the Triple-A Pacific Coast League (PCL).

=== Seattle Mariners ===
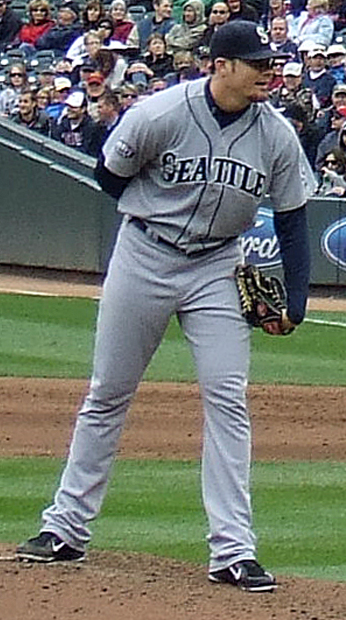
Beavan in 2011

Soon after the promotion, on July 9, 2010, Beavan was traded to the Seattle Mariners along with Justin Smoak and fellow prospects Matt Lawson and Josh Lueke for Cliff Lee and Mark Lowe. The Mariners assigned Beavan to the West Tenn Diamond Jaxx of the Double-A Southern League.

Beavan started the 2011 season with the Tacoma Rainiers of the Triple-A PCL. He pitched to a 5–3 record and a 4.45 ERA with Tacoma. On July 2, 2011, the Mariners announced that Beavan would be making his major league debut on July 3 against the San Diego Padres. Seattle beat the Padres 3–1, with Beavan going 7 innings and giving up 1 earned run on 3 hits.

Beavan entered the 2012 season in contention for a spot in the Mariners' starting rotation. He won a spot in the rotation for Opening Day. Beavan threw a quality start opposing Philip Humber during Humber's perfect game on April 21.

On August 2, 2014, the Mariners outrighted Beavan off of the 40-man roster.

=== Arizona Diamondbacks ===
On December 4, 2014, the Arizona Diamondbacks signed Beavan to a minor league deal. He was released on July 13, 2015.

=== Bridgeport Bluefish ===
On May 18, 2016, Beavan signed with the Bridgeport Bluefish of the Atlantic League of Professional Baseball. He became a free agent following the season. In 18 games (16 starts) 92 innings he went 5-4 with a 4.60 ERA and 61 strikeouts.

=== Pericos De Puebla ===
On March 10, 2017, Beavan signed with the Pericos de Puebla of the Mexican League. In 6 starts 35.2 innings he went 1–0 with a 3.79 ERA and 24 strikeouts.

=== New York Mets ===
On May 4, 2017, Beavan signed with the New York Mets on a minor league deal and was assigned to Las Vegas 51s. In 6 starts split between Las Vegas and the Double-A Binghamton Rumble Ponies, Beavan recorded a 3.79 ERA with 24 strikeouts in 35 2/3 innings pitched. He elected free agency following the season on November 6.

=== Pitching style ===
Beavan threw five pitches. His primary pitch was a four-seam fastball at 90–93 mph, and he had a two-seam fastball with similar velocity that was used frequently against left-handed hitters (less so against righties). His main off-speed pitch was a curveball in the mid-to-upper 70s, although he also threw a changeup to lefties and a slider to righties (each in the low 80s).

== Personal life ==
Beavan has two older brothers, who are 13 and 11 years older than him, respectively. Both his brothers played college baseball but neither played professionally.

Beavan's wife is a cyclist. The two rode together in an effort to help Beavan lose weight during the 2011–12 offseason.

As of 2019, Beaven was a youth baseball coach for Dallas Tigers WEST.

In 2024, Beavan was working with a developer on a 127-acre youth sports complex in Roanoke, Texas.
