= 2012 Kansas City Royals season =

2012 Kansas City Royals
- League: American League
- Division: Central
- Ballpark: Kauffman Stadium
- City: Kansas City, Missouri
- Record: 72–90 (.444)
- Divisional place: 3rd
- Owners: David Glass
- General managers: Dayton Moore
- Managers: Ned Yost
- Television: Fox Sports Kansas City (Ryan Lefebvre, Jeff Montgomery, Rex Hudler, Steve Physioc)
- Radio: KCSP 610 AM (Denny Matthews, Bob Davis, Steve Stewart, Ryan Lefebvre, Steve Physioc)

The Kansas City Royals' season of 2012 was the 44th for the Royals franchise. The Royals hosted the 83rd MLB All-Star Game on July 10 at Kauffman Stadium, where the team played its 40th season of home games. The Royals finished 72–90, third place in the American League Central. The Royals also hosted the All-Star Game on July 10.

Prior to the 2013 Kansas City Royals season (during the offseason), the Royals donated over $4 million in funds raised during the 2012 All-Star game for various projects in the Kansas City area communities, including building two baseball facilities for disabled children.

Alex Gordon signed a $37.5 million four-year deal with the Royals.

Jeremy Guthrie signed a $25 million three-year deal in November 2012 to stay with the Royals.

== Season standings ==
=== American League Central ===
AL Central
Team	W	L	Pct.	GB	Home	Road
Detroit Tigers	88	74	.543	—	50‍–‍31	38‍–‍43
Chicago White Sox	85	77	.525	3	45‍–‍36	40‍–‍41
Kansas City Royals	72	90	.444	16	37‍–‍44	35‍–‍46
Cleveland Indians	68	94	.420	20	37‍–‍44	31‍–‍50
Minnesota Twins	66	96	.407	22	31‍–‍50	35‍–‍46

=== American League Wild Card ===
Division winners
Team	W	L	Pct.
New York Yankees	95	67	.586
Oakland Athletics	94	68	.580
Detroit Tigers	88	74	.543

Wild Card teams (Top 2 teams qualify for postseason)
Team	W	L	Pct.	GB
Texas Rangers	93	69	.574	—
Baltimore Orioles	93	69	.574	—
Tampa Bay Rays	90	72	.556	3
Los Angeles Angels of Anaheim	89	73	.549	4
Chicago White Sox	85	77	.525	8
Seattle Mariners	75	87	.463	18
Toronto Blue Jays	73	89	.451	20
Kansas City Royals	72	90	.444	21
Boston Red Sox	69	93	.426	24
Cleveland Indians	68	94	.420	25
Minnesota Twins	66	96	.407	27

=== Record vs. opponents ===
2012 American League record Source: MLB Standings Grid – 2012
Team	BAL	BOS	CWS	CLE	DET	KC	LAA	MIN	NYY	OAK	SEA	TB	TEX	TOR	NL
Baltimore	–	13–5	6–2	4–4	3–3	5–4	2–7	5–2	9–9	4–5	8–1	10–8	2–5	11–7	11–7
Boston	5–13	–	6–2	5–3	5–5	4–3	0–6	4–3	5–13	1–8	5–4	9–9	2–6	7–11	11–7
Chicago	2–6	2–6	–	11–7	6–12	6–12	3–5	14–4	5–2	3–3	8–1	4–3	6–3	6–4	9–9
Cleveland	4–4	3–5	7–11	–	10–8	8–10	5–4	6–12	1–5	2–8	4–4	4–4	4–5	2–4	8–10
Detroit	3–3	5–5	12–6	8–10	–	13–5	5–5	10–8	4–6	4–3	1–5	5–2	3–7	4–2	11–7
Kansas City	4–5	3–4	12–6	10–8	5–13	–	4–5	7–11	3–4	5–4	1–7	4–2	4–5	2–6	8–10
Los Angeles	7–2	6–0	5–3	4–5	5–5	5–4	–	6–3	4–5	9–10	11–8	1–9	10–9	4–4	12–6
Minnesota	2–5	3–4	4–14	12–6	8–10	11–7	3–6	–	3–4	4–5	2–8	1–5	2–8	2–5	9–9
New York	9–9	13–5	2–5	5–1	6–4	4–3	5–4	4–3	–	5–5	6–3	8–10	4–3	11–7	13–5
Oakland	5–4	8–1	3–3	8–2	3–4	4–5	10–9	5–4	5–5	–	12–7	5–4	11–8	5–4	10–8
Seattle	1–8	4–5	1–8	4–4	5–1	7–1	8–11	8–2	3–6	7–12	–	4–6	9–10	6–3	8–10
Tampa Bay	8–10	9–9	3–4	4–4	2–5	2–4	9–1	5–1	10–8	4–5	6–4	–	5–4	14–4	9–9
Texas	5–2	6–2	3–6	5–4	7–3	5–4	9–10	8–2	3–4	8–11	10–9	4–5	–	6–3	14–4
Toronto	7–11	11–7	4–6	4–2	2–4	6–2	4–4	5–2	7–11	4–5	3–6	4–14	3–6	–	9–9

- Source: MLB Standings Grid – 2012

== Game log ==
Legend
Royals Win	Royals Loss	Game postponed
* All times are CDT

2012 Game Log
April (6–15)

#	Date	Opponent	Time	Score	Win	Loss	Save	Attendance	Record
1	April 6	@ Angels	2:22	0–5	Weaver (1–0)	Crow (0–1)		44,106	0–1
2	April 7	@ Angels	2:46	6–3	Hochevar (1–0)	Haren (0–1)		40,022	1–1
3	April 8	@ Angels	3:15	7–3	Sánchez (1–0)	Santana (0–1)	Broxton (1)	32,227	2–1
4	April 9	@ Athletics	2:34	0–1	Milone (1–0)	Mendoza (0–1)	Balfour (2)	10,054	2–2
5	April 10	@ Athletics	2:13	3–0 (8)	Duffy (1–0)	Godfrey (0–1)	Crow (1)	10,670	3–2
6	April 11	@ Athletics	4:10	4–5 (12)	Carignan (1–1)	Broxton (0–1)		12,390	3–3
7	April 13	Indians	2:39	3–8	Lowe (2–0)	Hochevar (1–1)		40,230	3–4
8	April 14	Indians	3:44	9–11 (10)	Asencio (1–1)	Holland (0–1)	Perez (2)	21,788	3–5
9	April 15	Indians	3:20	7–13	Jiménez (1–0)	Mendoza (0–2)		21,182	3–6
10	April 16	Tigers	2:37	2–3	Verlander (1–1)	Duffy (1–1)		14,039	3–7
11	April 17	Tigers	2:50	1–3	Dotel (1–0)	Chen (0–1)	Valverde (2)	13,851	3–8
12	April 18	Tigers	3:06	3–4	Scherzer (1–1)	Mijares (0–1)	Valverde (3)	14,083	3–9
13	April 20	Blue Jays	3:14	3–4	Pérez (2–0)	Holland (0–2)	Santos (2)	23,065	3–10
14	April 21	Blue Jays	3:03	5–9	Hutchison (1–0)	Teaford (0–1)		27,804	3–11
15	April 22	Blue Jays	3:08	3–5	Romero (3–0)	Duffy (1–2)	Cordero (1)	26,891	3–12
16	April 23	Blue Jays	2:31	1–4	Morrow (1–1)	Chen (0–2)	Cordero (2)	13,267	3–13
17	April 24	@ Indians	3:12	3–4	Lowe (3–1)	Sánchez (1–1)	Perez (7)	9,137	3–14
18	April 25	@ Indians	2:50	8–2	Hochevar (2–1)	Jiménez (2–1)		10,552	4–14
19	April 26	@ Indians	3:00	4–2	Mendoza (1–2)	Tomlin (1–2)	Broxton (2)	9,229	5–14
20	April 27	@ Twins	3:00	7–6	Mijares (1–1)	Duensing (0–2)	Broxton (3)	33,315	6–14
N/A	April 28	@ Twins	Game Postponed (rain) (to be made up as a doubleheader on 6/30)						
21	April 29	@ Twins	3:02	4–7	Marquis (2–0)	Chen (0–3)		34,201	6–15
N/A	April 30	@ Tigers	Game Postponed (rain) (to be made up on 9/24)						

May (15–13)

#	Date	Opponent	Time	Score	Win	Loss	Save	Attendance	Record
22	May 1	@ Tigers	2:27	3–9	Porcello (2–2)	Hochevar (2–2)		30,159	6–16
23	May 2	@ Tigers	2:52	3–2	Collins (1–0)	Benoit (0–1)	Broxton (4)	33,187	7–16
24	May 3	Yankees	3:20	4–3	Duffy (2–2)	Phelps (0–1)	Broxton (5)	19,590	8–16
25	May 4	Yankees	2:34	2–6	Sabathia (4–0)	Chen (0–4)		24,153	8–17
26	May 5	Yankees	3:03	5–1	Paulino (1–0)	Kuroda (2–4)		29,121	9–17
27	May 6	Yankees	3:06	4–10	Hughes (2–4)	Hochevar (2–3)		20,434	9–18
28	May 7	Red Sox	3:11	5–11	Doubront (2–1)	Sánchez (1–2)	Padilla (1)	19,502	9–19
29	May 8	Red Sox	2:52	6–4	Mijares (2–1)	Bard (2–4)	Broxton (6)	20,524	10–19
30	May 9	Red Sox	2:55	4–3	Chen (1–4)	Lester (1–3)	Broxton (7)	18,339	11–19
31	May 11	@ White Sox	2:43	0–5	Floyd (3–3)	Paulino (1–1)		19,129	11–20
32	May 12	@ White Sox	2:46	5–0	Hochevar (3–3)	Sale (3–2)		20,066	12–20
33	May 13	@ White Sox	3:21	9–1	Mendoza (2–2)	Thornton (1–3)		22,636	13–20
34	May 14	@ Rangers	2:50	3–1	Chen (2–4)	Feldman (0–1)	Broxton (8)	38,702	14–20
35	May 15	@ Rangers	2:41	7–4	Mazzaro (1–0)	Lewis (3–3)		37,210	15–20
36	May 16	Orioles	4:10	3–4 (15)	Gregg (1–1)	Adcock (0–1)	Johnson (13)	17,949	15–21
37	May 17	Orioles	2:40	3–5	Matusz (3–4)	Hochevar (3–4)	Johnson (14)	31,076	15–22
38	May 18	Diamondbacks	3:06	4–6	Ziegler (3–1)	Herrera (0–1)	Putz (8)	33,694	15–23
39	May 19	Diamondbacks	2:54	7–3	Chen (3–4)	Kennedy (3–4)		27,469	16–23
40	May 20	Diamondbacks	2:37	0–2	Miley (5–1)	Adcock (0–2)	Putz (9)	24,234	16–24
41	May 21	@ Yankees	3:10	6–0	Paulino (2–1)	Kuroda (3–6)		39,229	17–24
42	May 22	@ Yankees	2:37	2–3	Hughes (4–5)	Hochevar (3–5)	Soriano (3)	37,674	17–25
43	May 23	@ Yankees	2:53	3–8	Pettitte (2–1)	Smith (0–1)		40,407	17–26
44	May 25	@ Orioles	3:00	2–8	Hammel (6–1)	Chen (3–5)		28,954	17–27
45	May 26	@ Orioles	3:14	4–3	Holland (1–2)	Strop (3–2)	Broxton (9)	26,714	18–27
46	May 27	@ Orioles	3:05	4–2	Collins (2–0)	Matusz (4–5)	Broxton (10)	33,919	19–27
47	May 28	@ Indians	3:01	5–8	Tomlin (2–2)	Adcock (0–3)	Perez (17)	25,377	19–28
48	May 29	@ Indians	2:44	8–2	Smith (1–1)	Masterson (2–4)		14,253	20–28
49	May 30	@ Indians	3:28	6–3	Chen (4–5)	Gómez (3–4)	Broxton (11)	17,112	21–28

June (14–13)

#	Date	Opponent	Time	Score	Win	Loss	Save	Attendance	Record
50	June 1	Athletics	2:24	2–0	Paulino (2–1)	Colón (4–6)	Broxton (12)	29,527	22–28
51	June 2	Athletics	3:09	3–9	McCarthy (4–3)	Hochevar (3–6)		26,276	22–29
52	June 3	Athletics	2:37	2–0	Mazzaro (2–0)	Milone (6–5)	Broxton (13)	21,111	23–29
53	June 4	Twins	3:07	7–10	De Vries (1–1)	Smith (1–2)	Capps (13)	16,531	23–30
54	June 5	Twins	2:25	1–0	Chen (5–5)	Liriano (1–6)	Broxton (14)	23,934	24–30
55	June 6	Twins	3:04	2–4	Blackburn (2–4)	Mendoza (2–3)	Capps (14)	18,386	24–31
56	June 8	@ Pirates	2:32	2–4	Bédard (4–6)	Hochevar (3–7)	Hanrahan (16)	36,069	24–32
57	June 9	@ Pirates	3:14	3–5	Hughes (2–0)	Mazzaro (2–1)	Hanrahan (17)	39,312	24–33
58	June 10	@ Pirates	2:55	2–3	Burnett (6–2)	Chen (5–6)	Grilli (1)	25,752	24–34
59	June 12	Brewers	2:36	2–1	Holland (2–2)	Rodríguez (0–4)	Broxton (15)	24,258	25–34
60	June 13	Brewers	3:27	4–3 (11)	Collins (3–0)	Loe (2–2)		17,885	26–34
61	June 14	Brewers	2:48	4–3	Collins (4–0)	Axford (1–3)		21,869	27–34
62	June 15	@ Cardinals	2:39	3–2	Mazzaro (3–1)	Lohse (6–2)	Broxton (16)	42,001	28–34
63	June 16	@ Cardinals	3:38	7–10	Boggs (1–1)	Collins (4–1)	Motte (14)	42,018	28–35
64	June 17	@ Cardinals	5:00	5–3 (15)	Broxton (1–1)	Sánchez (0–1)		41,680	29–35
65	June 18	@ Astros	3:04	7–9	Happ (5–7)	Sánchez (1–3)	Cedeño (1)	15,436	29–36
66	June 19	@ Astros	2:31	2–0	Hochevar (4–7)	Rodríguez (6–5)	Broxton (17)	18,098	30–36
67	June 20	@ Astros	2:41	2–1	Chen (6–6)	Lyles (1–4)	Broxton (18)	30,687	31–36
68	June 22	Cardinals	3:05	4–11	Kelly (1–0)	Mazzaro (3–2)		37,902	31–37
69	June 23	Cardinals	2:58	2–8	Wainwright (6–7)	Mendoza (2–4)		37,240	31–38
70	June 24	Cardinals	3:08	8–11	Marte (1–1)	Collins (4–2)		29,063	31–39
71	June 25	Rays	2:17	8–0	Hochevar (5–7)	Cobb (3–4)		20,200	32–39
72	June 26	Rays	2:30	8–2	Chen (7–6)	Archer (0–2)		25,892	33–39
73	June 27	Rays	3:01	5–4	Crow (1–1)	Badenhop (1–2)	Broxton (19)	19,228	34–39
74	June 29	@ Twins	2:50	4–3	Mendoza (3–4)	Duensing (1–4)	Broxton (20)	33,359	35–39
75	June 30	@ Twins	2:45	2–7	Diamond (7–3)	Sánchez (1–4)		37,694	35–40
76	June 30	@ Twins	2:43	1–5	De Vries (2–1)	Hochevar (5–8)		37,629	35–41

July (7–19)

#	Date	Opponent	Time	Score	Win	Loss	Save	Attendance	Record
77	July 1	@ Twins	3:05	8–10	Gray (4–0)	Chen (7–7)		37,819	35–42
78	July 2	@ Blue Jays	2:36	11–3	Teaford (1–1)	Romero (8–3)		17,127	36–42
79	July 3	@ Blue Jays	2:30	3–6	Cecil (2–1)	Mazzaro (3–3)	Janssen (10)	15,516	36–43
80	July 4	@ Blue Jays	2:45	1–4	Villanueva (3–0)	Mendoza (3–5)	Janssen (11)	17,831	36–44
81	July 5	@ Blue Jays	3:16	9–6	Hochevar (6–8)	Álvarez (5–7)	Broxton (21)	20,598	37–44
82	July 6	@ Tigers	2:56	2–4	Smyly (4–3)	Sánchez (1–5)	Valverde (16)	39,144	37–45
83	July 7	@ Tigers	3:00	7–8	Fister (2–6)	Chen (7–8)		39,392	37–46
84	July 8	@ Tigers	2:41	1–7	Scherzer (8–5)	Teaford (1–2)		36,693	37–47
85	July 13	White Sox	5:23	8–9 (14)	Axelrod (1–2)	Teaford (1–3)		32,744	37–48
86	July 14	White Sox	2:56	6–3	Holland (3–2)	Peavy (7–6)	Broxton (22)	24,998	38–48
87	July 15	White Sox	2:52	1–2	Sale (11–2)	Mendoza (3–6)	Reed (14)	25,714	38–49
88	July 16	Mariners	2:59	4–9	Vargas (9–7)	Sánchez (1–6)		16,697	38–50
89	July 17	Mariners	3:09	6–9	Beavan (4–6)	Verdugo (0–1)	Wilhelmsen (8)	15,769	38–51
90	July 18	Mariners	3:03	8–7	Holland (4–2)	Kinney (0–1)		17,312	39–51
91	July 19	Mariners	2:31	1–6	Hernández (8–5)	Smith (1–3)		16,706	39–52
92	July 20	Twins	3:23	1–2 (11)	Fien (1–0)	Broxton (1–2)	Perkins (5)	25,719	39–53
93	July 21	Twins	3:02	7–3	Mendoza (4–6)	Diamond (8–4)	Crow (2)	26,747	40–53
94	July 22	Twins	2:47	5–7	Deduno (1–0)	Guthrie (3–10)		23,252	40–54
95	July 23	@ Angels	3:21	3–6	Jepsen (1–1)	Holland (4–3)	Downs (9)	35,047	40–55
96	July 24	@ Angels	2:54	4–1	Smith (2–3)	Richards (3–2)	Broxton (23)	35,051	41–55
97	July 25	@ Angels	3:07	6–11	Weaver (13–1)	Hochevar (6–9)		39,107	41–56
98	July 26	@ Mariners	2:31	1–4	Vargas (11–7)	Mendoza (4–7)	Wilhelmsen (12)	15,014	41–57
99	July 27	@ Mariners	2:30	1–6	Beavan (6–6)	Guthrie (3–11)		14,953	41–58
100	July 28	@ Mariners	2:42	3–4	Millwood (4–8)	Chen (7–9)	Wilhelmsen (13)	32,111	41–59
101	July 29	@ Mariners	3:00	6–7	Pérez (1–2)	Mijares (2–2)	Wilhelmsen (14)	19,402	41–60
102	July 31	Indians	2:46	8–3	Hochevar (7–9)	Lowe (8–10)		18,569	42–60

August (17–11)

#	Date	Opponent	Time	Score	Win	Loss	Save	Attendance	Record
103	August 1	Indians	2:31	5–2	Mendoza (5–7)	McAllister (4–3)	Holland (1)	17,033	43–60
104	August 2	Indians	3:41	7–6 (11)	Crow (2–1)	Rogers (1–3)		15,135	44–60
105	August 3	Rangers	2:58	3–5	Harrison (13–6)	Guthrie (3–12)	Ogando (2)	26,889	44–61
106	August 4	Rangers	2:41	2–4	Feldman (6–6)	Smith (2–4)	Ogando (3)	28,724	44–62
107	August 5	Rangers	3:26	7–6 (10)	Holland (5–3)	Kirkman (0–2)		22,007	45–62
108	August 6	@ White Sox	2:17	2–4	Sale (13–3)	Mendoza (5–8)	Reed (20)	30,097	45–63
109	August 7	@ White Sox	2:34	5–2	Chen (8–9)	Peavy (9–8)	Holland (2)	27,194	46–63
110	August 8	@ White Sox	2:37	2–1	Guthrie (4–12)	Quintana (4–2)	Holland (3)	25,151	47–63
111	August 9	@ Orioles	2:40	8–2	Smith (3–4)	Chen (10–7)		21,226	48–63
112	August 10	@ Orioles	2:31	1–7	González (4–2)	Hochevar (7–10)		17,277	48–64
113	August 11	@ Orioles	2:59	7–3	Mendoza (6–8)	Tillman (5–2)		40,456	49–64
114	August 12	@ Orioles	2:44	3–5	Ayala (4–3)	Chen (8–10)	Johnson (34)	20,935	49–65
115	August 14	Athletics	2:23	5–0	Guthrie (5–12)	Parker (7–7)		16,107	50–65
116	August 15	Athletics	2:35	3–2	Smith (4–4)	McCarthy (6–4)	Holland (4)	15,591	51–65
117	August 16	Athletics	2:57	0–3	Straily (1–0)	Hochevar (7–11)	Balfour (9)	14,345	51–66
118	August 17	White Sox	2:31	4–2	Mendoza (7–8)	Sale (14–4)	Holland (5)	22,169	52–66
119	August 18	White Sox	2:59	9–4	Chen (9–10)	Peavy (9–9)		23,858	53–66
120	August 19	White Sox	2:43	5–2	Holland (6–3)	Crain (2–2)		22,401	54–66
121	August 20	@ Rays	2:46	1–5	Hellickson (8–8)	Smith (4–5)		9,913	54–67
122	August 21	@ Rays	2:46	1–0 (10)	Herrera (1–1)	Peralta (1–5)	Holland (6)	10,877	55–67
123	August 22	@ Rays	2:54	3–5	Shields (12–7)	Mendoza (7–9)	Rodney (39)	11,892	55–68
124	August 24	@ Red Sox	2:54	3–4	Lester (8–10)	Herrera (1–2)	Bailey (1)	37,228	55–69
125	August 25	@ Red Sox	4:31	10–9 (12)	Bueno (1–0)	Tazawa (0–1)	Holland (7)	37,103	56–69
126	August 26	@ Red Sox	3:36	6–8	Beato (1–0)	Smith (4–6)	Melancon (1)	37,188	56–70
127	August 27	@ Red Sox	2:34	1–5	Matsuzaka (1–3)	Hochevar (7–12)		37,506	56–71
128	August 28	Tigers	3:30	9–8	Crow (3–1)	Villarreal (3–4)	Holland (8)	13,601	57–71
129	August 29	Tigers	2:25	1–0	Chen (10–10)	Sánchez (7–11)	Holland (9)	13,024	58–71
130	August 30	Tigers	2:41	2–1	Guthrie (6–12)	Porcello (9–10)	Herrera (1)	12,997	59–71
N/A	August 31	Twins	Game Postponed (rain) (to be made up as a doubleheader on 9/1)						

September/October (13–19)

#	Date	Opponent	Time	Score	Win	Loss	Save	Attendance	Record
131	September 1	Twins	2:31	1–3	De Vries (4–5)	Smith (4–7)	Perkins (9)		59–72
132	September 1	Twins	3:07	7–8	Swarzak (3–4)	Hochevar (7–13)	Perkins (10)	23,189	59–73
133	September 2	Twins	2:55	6–4	Collins (5–2)	Vásquez (0–1)	Holland (10)	23,641	60–73
134	September 3	Rangers	2:40	4–8	Darvish (14–9)	Chen (10–11)		22,207	60–74
135	September 4	Rangers	2:32	6–3	Guthrie (7–12)	Harrison (15–9)	Holland (11)	12,462	61–74
136	September 5	Rangers	2:58	6–7	Dempster (10–6)	Teaford (1–4)	Nathan (29)	13,354	61–75
137	September 6	Rangers	3:20	4–5 (10)	Adams (4–3)	Holland (6–4)	Nathan (30)	15,332	61–76
138	September 7	@ White Sox	3:02	7–5	Herrera (2–2)	Reed (3–2)	Holland (12)	26,660	62–76
139	September 8	@ White Sox	2:48	4–5	Sale (16–6)	Chen (10–12)	Reed (26)	26,227	62–77
140	September 9	@ White Sox	3:30	2–1 (10)	Herrera (3–2)	Myers (2–7)	Holland (13)	19,356	63–77
141	September 11	@ Twins	2:56	9–1	Smith (5–7)	Diamond (11–7)		28,993	64–77
142	September 12	@ Twins	3:25	10–5	Hochevar (8–13)	Walters (2–4)		28,139	65–77
143	September 13	@ Twins	3:13	3–4 (10)	Perkins (3–1)	Bueno (1–1)		28,669	65–78
144	September 14	Angels	3:42	7–9	Walden (3–2)	Collins (5–3)	Frieri (19)	27,586	65–79
145	September 15	Angels	2:23	3–2	Herrera (4–2)	Frieri (4–1)		23,027	66–79
146	September 16	Angels	2:43	3–4	Haren (11–11)	Smith (5–8)	Jepsen (2)	24,979	66–80
147	September 18	White Sox	2:12	2–3	Floyd (10–10)	Hochevar (8–14)	Reed (28)	14,420	66–81
148	September 19	White Sox	2:51	3–0	Chen (11–12)	Sale (17–7)	Holland (14)	15,120	67–81
149	September 20	White Sox	2:41	4–3	Holland (7–4)	Crain (2–3)		14,710	68–81
150	September 21	Indians	2:41	6–3	Mendoza (8–9)	Masterson (11–15)	Holland (15)	22,805	69–81
151	September 22	Indians	2:47	5–3	Smith (6–8)	Jiménez (9–17)	Herrera (2)	24,304	70–81
152	September 23	Indians	3:17	4–15	Huff (2–0)	Odorizzi (0–1)		22,960	70–82
153	September 24	@ Tigers	2:34	2–6	Verlander (16–8)	Hochevar (8–15)		31,521	70–83
154	September 25	@ Tigers	2:13	0–2	Sánchez (9–13)	Chen (11–13)		29,048	70–84
155	September 26	@ Tigers	2:39	4–5	Benoit (4–3)	Herrera (4–3)	Valverde (32)	32,360	70–85
156	September 27	@ Tigers	2:33	4–5	Benoit (5–3)	Collins (5–4)		33,019	70–86
157	September 28	@ Indians	3:00	5–8	Huff (3–0)	Smith (6–9)	Perez (39)	14,850	70–87
158	September 29	@ Indians	4:52	7–6 (14)	Mazzaro (4–3)	Maine (2–3)	Herrera (3)	17,109	71–87
159	September 30	@ Indians	3:02	3–15	McAllister (6–8)	Hochevar (8–16)		18,099	71–88
160	October 1	Tigers	2:55	3–6	Porcello (10–12)	Chen (11–14)	Valverde (35)	15,312	71–89
161	October 2	Tigers	2:34	4–2	Guthrie (8–12)	Fister (10–10)	Holland (16)	14,283	72–89
162	October 3	Tigers	7:10	0–1	Marte (1–0)	Mendoza (8–10)	Putkonen (1)	30,383	72–90

== Roster ==
2012 Kansas City Royals
Roster
Pitchers: 47 Nathan Adcock; 51 Jonathan Broxton; 67 Francisley Bueno; 52 Bruce Chen; 31 Louis Coleman; 55 Tim Collins; 66 Román Colón; 43 Aaron Crow; 23 Danny Duffy; 33 Jeremy Guthrie; 40 Kelvin Herrera; 44 Luke Hochevar; 56 Greg Holland; 46 Tommy Hottovy; 41 Jeremy Jeffress; 32 Vin Mazzaro; 39 Luis Mendoza; 50 José Mijares; 49 Jake Odorizzi; 59 Felipe Paulino; 57 Jonathan Sánchez; 53 Will Smith; 61 Everett Teaford; 62 Ryan Verdugo	Catchers: 50 Adam Moore; 27 Brayan Peña; 13 Salvador Pérez; 28 Manny Piña; 33 Humberto Quintero; Infielders: 34 Tony Abreu; 11 Yuniesky Betancourt; 16 Billy Butler; 2 Alcides Escobar; 19 Irving Falu; 17 Chris Getz; 9 Johnny Giavotella; 35 Eric Hosmer; 8 Mike Moustakas	Outfielders: 30 Jason Bourgeois; 6 Lorenzo Cain; 1 Jarrod Dyson; 21 Jeff Francoeur; 4 Alex Gordon; 7 David Lough; 12 Mitch Maier; Other batters: 25 Clint Robinson	Manager: 3 Ned Yost; Coaches: 15 Chino Cadahia (bench); 58 Dave Eiland (pitching); -- Bill Fischer (bullpen); 54 Steve Foster (bullpen); 18 Rusty Kuntz (first base); 14 Eddie Rodríguez (third base); 36 Kevin Seitzer (hitting); 7 Doug Sisson (first base)

== Player stats ==
= Indicates team leader

=== Batting ===
Note: G = Games played; AB = At bats; R = Runs; H = Hits; 2B = Doubles; 3B = Triples; HR = Home runs; RBI = Runs batted in; SB = Stolen bases; BB = Walks; AVG = Batting average; SLG = Slugging average

Player	G	AB	R	H	2B	3B	HR	RBI	SB	BB	AVG	SLG
Alex Gordon	161	642	93	189	51	5	14	72	10	73	.294	.455
Billy Butler	161	614	72	192	32	1	29	107	2	54	.313	.510
Alcides Escobar	155	605	68	177	30	7	5	52	35	27	.293	.390
Mike Moustakas	149	563	69	136	34	1	20	73	5	39	.242	.412
Jeff Francoeur	148	561	58	132	26	3	16	49	4	34	.235	.378
Eric Hosmer	152	535	65	124	22	2	14	60	16	56	.232	.359
Jarrod Dyson	102	292	52	76	8	5	0	9	30	30	.260	.322
Salvador Pérez	76	289	38	87	16	0	11	39	0	12	.301	.471
Lorenzo Cain	61	222	27	59	9	2	7	31	10	15	.266	.419
Yuniesky Betancourt	57	215	21	49	14	1	7	36	0	9	.228	.400
Brayan Peña	68	212	16	50	10	1	2	25	0	9	.236	.321
Chris Getz	64	189	22	52	10	3	0	17	9	11	.275	.360
Johnny Giavotella	53	181	21	43	7	1	1	15	3	8	.238	.304
Humberto Quintero	43	138	7	32	12	0	1	19	0	4	.232	.341
Irving Falú	24	85	14	29	6	1	0	7	0	4	.341	.435
Tony Abreu	22	70	5	18	2	1	1	15	0	2	.257	.357
Mitch Maier	32	64	8	11	1	1	2	7	2	8	.172	.313
Jason Bourgeois	30	62	10	16	2	1	0	5	5	4	.258	.323
David Lough	20	59	9	14	2	1	0	2	1	4	.237	.305
Adam Moore	4	11	1	2	1	0	1	2	0	1	.182	.545
Clint Robinson	4	4	0	0	0	0	0	0	0	0	.000	.000
Manny Piña	1	2	0	0	0	0	0	0	0	0	.000	.000
Pitcher totals	162	21	0	4	0	0	0	1	0	0	.190	.190
Team totals	162	5636	676	1492	295	37	131	643	132	404	.265	.400

=== Pitching ===
Note: W = Wins; L = Losses; ERA = Earned run average; G = Games pitched; GS = Games started; SV = Saves; IP = Innings pitched; H = Hits allowed; R = Runs allowed; ER = Earned runs allowed; BB = Walks allowed; SO =Strikeouts

Player	W	L	ERA	G	GS	SV	IP	H	R	ER	BB	SO
Bruce Chen	11	14	5.07	34	34	0	191.2	215	114	108	47	140
Luke Hochevar	8	16	5.73	32	32	0	185.1	202	127	118	61	144
Luis Mendoza	8	10	4.23	30	25	0	166.0	176	84	78	59	104
Jeremy Guthrie	5	3	3.16	14	14	0	91.0	84	37	32	19	56
Will Smith	6	9	5.32	16	16	0	89.2	111	54	53	33	59
Kelvin Herrera	4	3	2.35	76	0	3	84.1	79	24	22	21	77
Tim Collins	5	4	3.36	72	0	0	69.2	55	29	26	34	93
Greg Holland	7	4	2.96	67	0	16	67.0	58	22	22	34	91
Aaron Crow	3	1	3.48	73	0	2	64.2	54	27	25	22	65
Everett Teaford	1	4	4.99	18	5	0	61.1	68	34	34	21	35
Jonathan Sánchez	1	6	7.76	12	12	0	53.1	65	47	46	44	36
Louis Coleman	0	0	3.71	42	0	0	51.0	41	23	21	26	65
Vin Mazzaro	4	3	5.73	18	6	0	44.0	55	29	28	19	26
José Mijares	2	2	2.56	51	0	0	38.2	36	13	11	13	37
Felipe Paulino	3	1	1.67	7	7	0	37.2	31	8	7	15	39
Jonathan Broxton	1	2	2.27	35	0	23	35.2	36	11	9	14	25
Nathan Adcock	0	3	2.34	12	2	0	34.2	37	13	9	13	22
Danny Duffy	2	2	3.90	6	6	0	27.2	26	13	12	18	28
Francisley Bueno	1	1	1.56	18	0	0	17.1	16	4	3	2	7
Jeremy Jeffress	0	0	6.75	13	0	0	13.1	19	14	10	13	13
Tommy Hottovy	0	0	2.89	9	0	0	9.1	11	3	3	5	6
Román Colón	0	0	6.75	3	0	0	8.0	12	6	6	3	3
Jake Odorizzi	0	1	4.91	2	2	0	7.1	8	4	4	4	4
Ryan Verdugo	0	1	32.40	1	1	0	1.2	8	6	6	2	2
Mitch Maier	0	0	0.00	1	0	0	1.0	1	0	0	0	0
Team totals	72	90	4.30	162	162	44	1451.1	1504	746	693	542	1177

== Awards and honors ==
All-Star Game

- Billy Butler, Outfield, Reserve

== Farm system ==
Level	Team	League	Manager
AAA	Omaha Storm Chasers	Pacific Coast League	Mike Jirschele
AA	Northwest Arkansas Naturals	Texas League	Brian Poldberg
A	Wilmington Blue Rocks	Carolina League	Vance Wilson
A	Kane County Cougars	Midwest League	Brian Buchanan
Rookie	Burlington Royals	Appalachian League	Tommy Shields
Rookie	AZL Royals	Arizona League	Darryl Kennedy
Rookie	Idaho Falls Chukars	Pioneer League	Omar Ramírez
