= Everett Teaford =

American baseball player (born 1984)

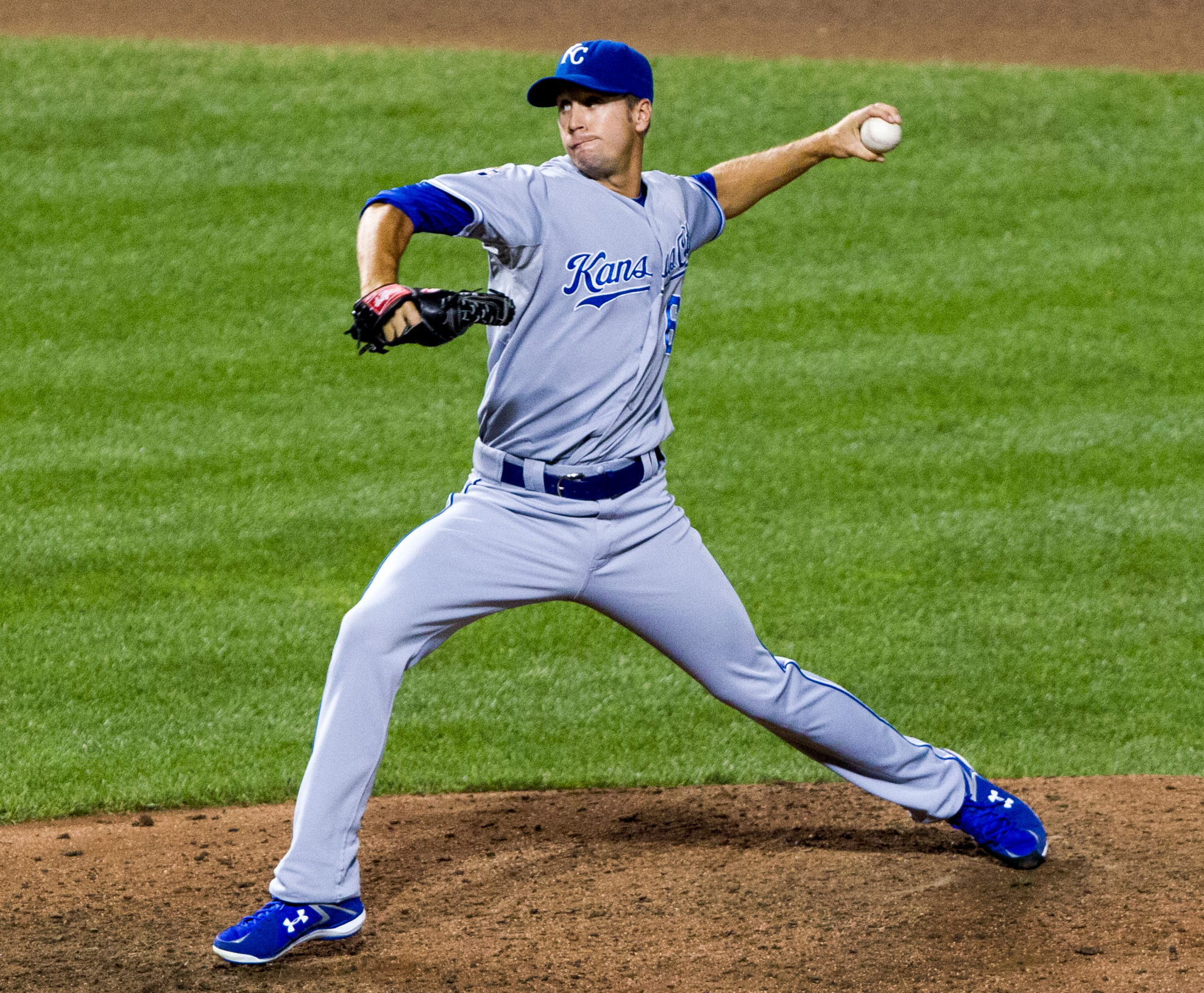
- Teaford with the Kansas City Royals in 2012

Auburn Tigers
- Pitcher / Coach
- Born: May 15, 1984 (age 42); Alpharetta, Georgia, U.S.
- Batted: Left Threw: Left

Professional debut
- MLB: May 17, 2011, for the Kansas City Royals
- KBO: April 12, 2014, for the LG Twins

Last appearance
- MLB: July 7, 2015, for the Tampa Bay Rays
- KBO: October 17, 2014, for the LG Twins

MLB statistics
- Win–loss record: 3–5
- Earned run average: 4.11
- Strikeouts: 67

KBO statistics
- Win–loss record: 5–6
- Earned run average: 5.24
- Strikeouts: 85
- Stats at Baseball Reference

Teams
- Kansas City Royals (2011–2013); LG Twins (2014); Tampa Bay Rays (2015)

Everett James Teaford (born May 15, 1984) is an American baseball coach for the Auburn Tigers, and a former professional baseball pitcher who played in Major League Baseball (MLB) for the Kansas City Royals and Tampa Bay Rays, and in the KBO League for the LG Twins.

== Amateur career ==
Teaford was born May 15, 1984, in Alpharetta, Georgia. He attended Centennial High School in Roswell, Georgia, and then Georgia Southern University. In 2005, he played collegiate summer baseball with the Orleans Cardinals of the Cape Cod Baseball League. As a junior at Georgia Southern, he had a 10–4 record and a 3.96 earned run average (ERA). He tied for second in the Southern Conference in wins and led it in innings pitched (120 1/3), strikeouts (122), and complete games (four). He decided to become a professional after his junior year, having finished his collegiate career with the second-most strikeouts (353) of anyone to play at Georgia Southern. He was drafted by the Kansas City Royals in the 12th round of the 2006 Major League Baseball draft.

== Professional career ==
=== Kansas City Royals ===
==== Minor leagues ====
Teaford played for the Idaho Falls Chukars in 2006, going 5–1 with a 3.71 ERA in 15 games (12 starts). He pitched for the Burlington Bees in 2007, posting a 6–8 record with a 4.68 ERA in 27 games (21 starts). In 2008, Teaford pitched for the Wilmington Blue Rocks and went 8–6 with a 3.80 ERA in 28 games (23 starts). He split 2009 between the Blue Rocks and Northwest Arkansas Naturals, going 10–8 with a 3.91 ERA in 27 starts. In 2010, he went 14–4 with a 3.82 ERA in 28 games (13 starts) for the Naturals and Omaha Royals. He struck out 117 batters in 103 2/3 innings.

==== Major leagues ====
Kansas City promoted Teaford to the major leagues for the first time on May 16, 2011, to replace Vin Mazzaro. Since starting on May 16, 2011, Teaford has played in a total of 14 games. On August 3, 2011, Teaford earned his first major league save in a 6–2 Royals victory over the Baltimore Orioles. In 26 games (3 starts) with the Royals in 2011, he went 2–1 with a 3.27 ERA and 1 hold, striking out 28 in 44 innings.

Teaford made the Royals' Opening Day roster in 2012, beating out Louis Coleman, and was one of three left-handed relievers to make the team. Teaford pitched 4 scoreless innings in his season debut on April 13 against the Indians. In his first start, against the Twins on April 27, he went 4 innings, giving up 8 hits and 4 runs in a no-decision. After the start, he was optioned to the Triple-A Omaha Storm Chasers, and was replaced by Nate Adcock. He made 3 starts for the Storm Chasers before being recalled on May 17 to start the game on May 20 against Arizona, only to go on the disabled list with a lower abdominal strain without making the start. He was again replaced by Adcock, who made the start. He appeared in 4 more games with Omaha before being recalled on June 27, replacing Francisley Bueno. He started that day's game, going 5 innings, giving up 4 hits and 2 runs while striking out 5. He made 2 more starts before being moved to the bullpen, where he was replaced by Ryan Verdugo. He made one start in September, but was used mostly as a long reliever during his time up. In 18 games (5 starts) in 2012 with the Royals, he went 1–4 with a 4.99 ERA, striking out 35 in 61.1 innings.

Teaford began 2013 in Omaha's bullpen, and was sporadically used to make starts throughout the season. He was recalled on July 13 to replace fellow left-handed reliever Donnie Joseph, who had pitched the previous two games. He made one appearance with Kansas City, and was optioned back to Omaha during the All-Star break, where he finished the year. In 31 games (14 starts) with Omaha, he went 4–6 with a 3.49 ERA, striking out 99 in 95.1 innings.

Teaford was designated for assignment by the Royals on January 29, 2014. On February 7, he cleared waivers and was sent outright to the Triple-A Omaha Storm Chasers.

=== LG Twins ===
On March 30, 2014, Teaford was sold to the LG Twins of the KBO League. In 20 games (19 starts) for the Twins, Teaford compiled 5-6 record and 5.24 ERA with 85 strikeouts across 99 2/3 innings pitched.

=== Tampa Bay Rays ===
On January 16, 2015, Teaford signed a minor league contract with the Tampa Bay Rays organization. On April 25, the Rays selected Teaford's contract, adding him to their active roster. He was designated for assignment on April 28, following the acquisition of Xavier Cedeño. Teaford cleared waivers and was sent outright to the Triple-A Durham Bulls on April 30. On July 4, the Rays selected Teaford back to their active roster. In 4 total appearances for the team, he compiled a 1.59 ERA with 4 strikeouts across 5 2/3 innings pitched. Teaford was designated for assignment for a second time when Andrew Bellatti was activated from the disabled list. He cleared waivers and was sent back outright to Durham on July 10. Teaford elected free agency on October 5.

== Coaching career ==
In January 2018, Teaford joined the Chicago White Sox as a quality control coach to help with player development.

In 2023, Auburn University hired Teaford to be the pitching coach for the Auburn Tigers baseball team.

== Pitching style ==
Teaford has a wide variety of pitches: he throws a four-seam fastball (89–92 mph), a two-seam fastball (89–91), a cutter (87–89), a curveball (79–81), and a changeup (83–86). He has also experimented with a slider.
