= Luis Mendoza (baseball) =

Mexican baseball player (born 1983)

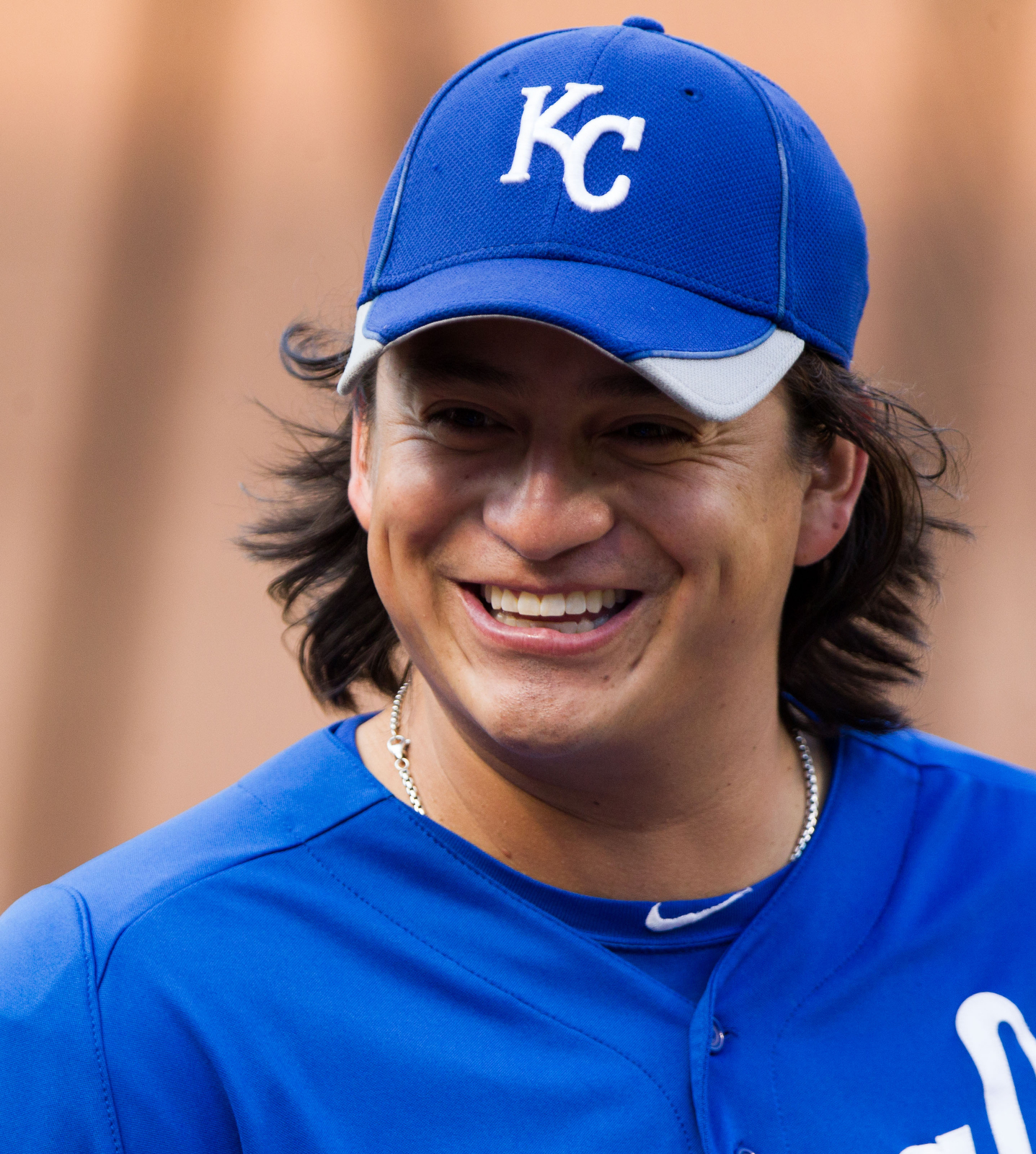
- Mendoza with the Kansas City Royals in 2012
- Pitcher
- Born: October 31, 1983 (age 42); Veracruz, Veracruz, Mexico
- Batted: Right Threw: Right

Professional debut
- MLB: September 8, 2007, for the Texas Rangers
- NPB: April 1, 2014, for the Hokkaido Nippon Ham Fighters

Last appearance
- MLB: September 6, 2013, for the Kansas City Royals
- NPB: September 29, 2017, for the Hanshin Tigers

MLB statistics
- Win–loss record: 16–25
- Earned run average: 5.39
- Strikeouts: 208

NPB statistics
- Win–loss record: 27–38
- Earned run average: 3.85
- Strikeouts: 352
- Stats at Baseball Reference

Teams
- Texas Rangers (2007–2009); Kansas City Royals (2010–2013); Hokkaido Nippon Ham Fighters (2014–2017); Hanshin Tigers (2017)

Luis Alonso Mendoza Rodríguez (born October 31, 1983) is a Mexican former professional baseball pitcher. He played in Major League Baseball for the Texas Rangers and the Kansas City Royals and Nippon Professional Baseball for the Hokkaido Nippon Ham Fighters and the Hanshin Tigers.

== Career ==
=== Boston Red Sox ===
Mendoza was signed by the Boston Red Sox as an amateur free agent on July 12, 2000. Mendoza made his professional debut in 2002 with the GCL Red Sox. He spent the majority of the 2003 season with the Single-A Augusta GreenJackets, pitching to a 2.26 ERA in 13 appearances. He spent all of 2004 with the High-A Sarasota Red Sox, recording a 8-7 record and 3.74 ERA in 25 games. Mendoza was assigned to the Wilmington Blue Rocks to begin the 2005 season.

=== San Diego Padres ===
Mendoza was claimed off waivers by the San Diego Padres on July 8, 2005. He was assigned to the High-A Lake Elsinore Storm. He made two starts for the Storm going 0–1 with 9.28 ERA.

=== Second stint with Boston Red Sox ===
Mendoza was placed on waivers by the Padres and on July 28, 2005, was reclaimed by the Boston Red Sox. He finished the 2005 season struggling for the High-A Wilmington Blue Rocks in which he had a 6.34 ERA and a 4–9 record in 23 games (22 starts). Mendoza began the 2006 season for the Blue Rocks. After 13 starts in which he went 5–4 with a 2.86 ERA, he was promoted to the Double-A Portland Sea Dogs on June 12, 2006. He made 9 starts for the Sea Dogs going 1–5 with a 6.38 ERA.

=== Texas Rangers ===
On July 30, 2006, Mendoza was traded to the Texas Rangers for relief pitcher Bryan Corey. He finished the 2006 season with the Double-A Frisco RoughRiders. He struggled with the Roughriders as he had a 7.75 ERA with a 2–4 record in 7 starts.

Mendoza began the 2007 season with the RoughRiders. He finished the minor league season with the Roughriders going 15–4 with a 3.93 ERA in 26 games (25 starts). He was second in the Texas League with his 15 wins, tenth in the league with a 3.93 ERA, and led the league in complete games (3). He was also a Texas League Mid-Season All-Star and Post-Season All-Star.

Mendoza's strong performance earned him a callup on September 5, 2007. Mendoza made his debut on September 8 when he started the game against the Oakland Athletics, becoming the 101st major-league player to have been born in Mexico. His start was cut short, however. In the second inning with Nick Swisher batting, Swisher hit a line drive which hit him in the left knee cap and he dropped to the ground. He got back up and finished the second inning. When he went into the dugout, his knee began to stiffen up on him and he left the game.

On August 14, 2009, Mendoza threw a no-hitter for the Oklahoma City RedHawks against the Salt Lake Bees.

=== Kansas City Royals ===
On April 2, 2010, Mendoza was traded to the Kansas City Royals for cash considerations.

On July 18, 2011, Mendoza threw what was initially declared a no-hitter for the Omaha Storm Chasers against the Memphis Redbirds. However, two days later, a two-base error in the ninth inning was changed to a double in the official scoring, turning it into a complete game one-hitter.

On February 18, 2012, the Royals announced they had signed Mendoza to a one-year contract for the 2012 season. No financial terms of the deal were released.

Mendoza began 2013 as the Royals fifth starter, where he started until his rotation spot was taken by Bruce Chen on July 8. From then on, he was used sparingly, pitching in 6 games the rest of the season. In 22 games (15 starts) in 2013, Mendoza went 2–6 with a 5.36 ERA, striking out 54 in 94 innings.

=== Hokkaido Nippon-Ham Fighters ===
On November 11, the Royals requested release waivers on Mendoza so he could play with the Hokkaido Nippon-Ham Fighters of the Pacific League of Nippon Professional Baseball. His contract was a two-year, $2 million deal. Mendoza re-signed for the 2016 season, and played most of the 2017 season with the club before he was placed on waivers in late August.

=== Hanshin Tigers ===
On August 31, 2017, Mendoza was claimed off waivers by the Hanshin Tigers of Nippon Professional Baseball. He became a free agent following the season.

=== Diablos Rojos del México ===
On April 17, 2018, Mendoza signed with the Diablos Rojos del México of the Mexican Baseball League. He was released on April 4, 2019. In 11 starts 66 innings he went 1-3 with a 3.95 ERA with 52 strikeouts and throwing 1 complete game.

=== Leones de Yucatán ===
On April 8, 2019, Mendoza signed with the Leones de Yucatán of the Mexican League. He was released on May 13, 2019. In 5 starts 20.1 innings he struggled mightily going 0-5 with a 6.64 ERA with 11 strikeouts.

=== Retirement ===
On January 31, 2020, Mendoza signed with the Pericos de Puebla of the Mexican League. However, the season was canceled due to the COVID-19 pandemic.

On February 10, 2021, Mendoza officially announced his retirement from professional baseball. He later joined the front office of the new Mariachis de Guadalajara franchise of the Mexican League.

== International career ==
He was selected Mexico national baseball team at 2013 World Baseball Classic, 2017 World Baseball Classic and 2019 exhibition games against Japan.

== Pitching style ==
Mendoza has four pitches: a sinker (91–93 mph), a knuckle curveball (81–85 mph), a four-seam fastball (91–94 mph), and a changeup (83–86 mph). He uses the sinker early in the count and the curveball mostly when ahead in the count or with 2 strikes. He only uses the changeup against left handed hitters.

== Legacy ==
On 4 December 2024, the Yaquis de Obregón retired Mendoza's number 46.
