= Felipe Paulino =

Dominican-Venezuelan baseball player (born 1983)

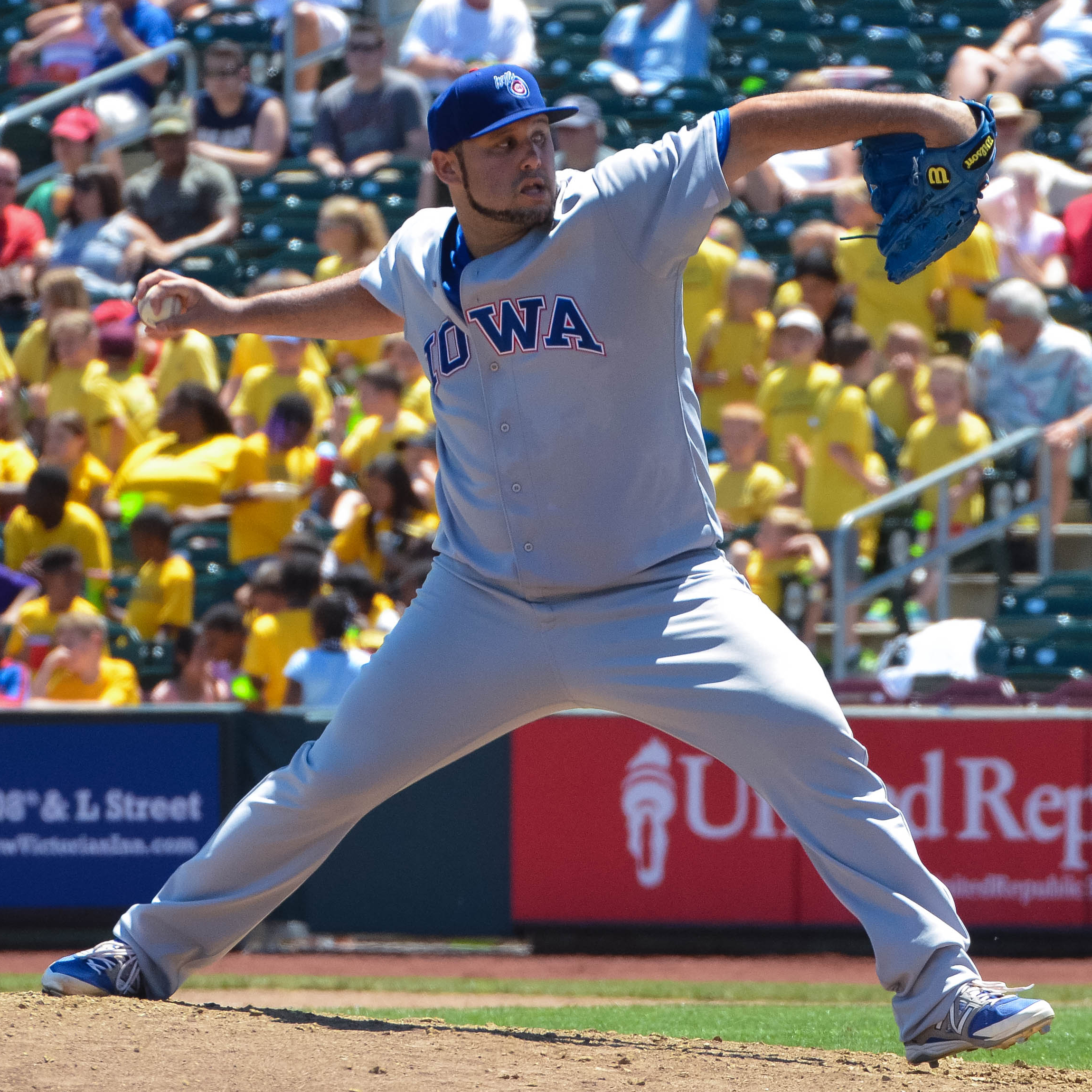
- Paulino pitching for the Iowa Cubs, Triple-A affiliate of the Chicago Cubs, in 2015
- Starting pitcher
- Born: October 5, 1983 (age 43); Santo Domingo, Dominican Republic
- Batted: Right Threw: Right

Professional debut
- MLB: September 5, 2007, for the Houston Astros
- NPB: June 18, 2016, for the Saitama Seibu Lions

Last appearance
- MLB: April 18, 2014, for the Chicago White Sox
- NPB: 2016, for the Saitama Seibu Lions

MLB statistics
- Win–loss record: 13–34
- Earned run average: 5.22
- Strikeouts: 373

NPB statistics
- Win–loss record: 0–6
- Earned run average: 3.89
- Strikeouts: 25
- Stats at Baseball Reference

Teams
- Houston Astros (2007, 2009–2010); Colorado Rockies (2011); Kansas City Royals (2011–2012); Chicago White Sox (2014); Saitama Seibu Lions (2016)

Felipe Albertin Paulino Del Guidice (born October 5, 1983) is a Dominican-Venezuelan former professional baseball pitcher. He played in Major League Baseball (MLB) for the Houston Astros, Colorado Rockies, Kansas City Royals and Chicago White Sox, and in Nippon Professional Baseball (NPB) with the Saitama Seibu Lions.

== Career ==
=== Houston Astros ===
Paulino was signed as an undrafted free agent on July 2, 2001. He was called up to the major leagues in September 2007. He made his major league debut on September 5, 2007, against the Milwaukee Brewers and through 3 innings, he gave up 5 runs.

=== Colorado Rockies ===
On November 18, 2010, Paulino was traded to the Colorado Rockies for Clint Barmes. He was designated for assignment on May 21, 2011.

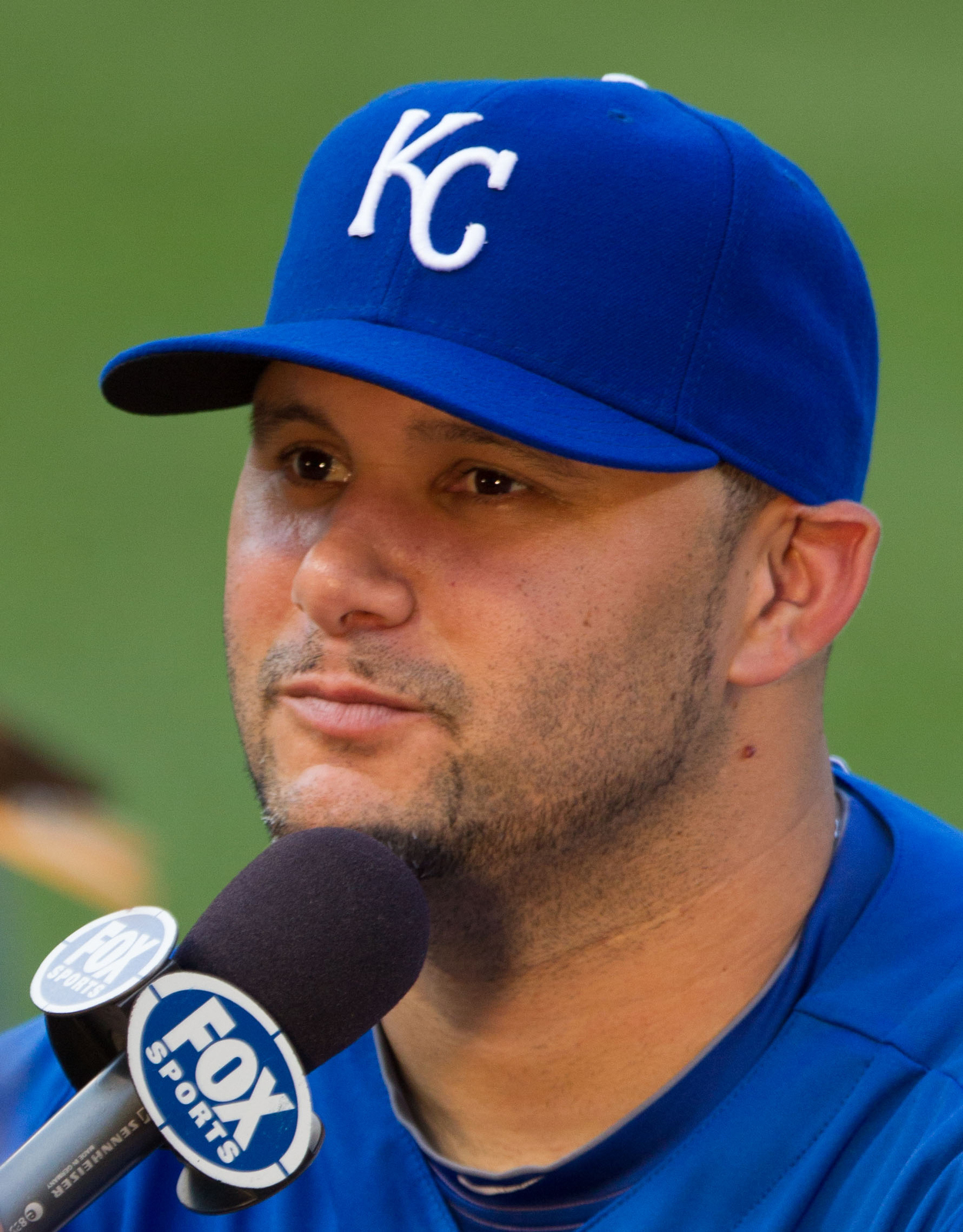
Paulino with the Kansas City Royals in 2012

=== Kansas City Royals ===
Paulino was traded to the Kansas City Royals for cash considerations on May 26, 2011. He made 20 starts for the Royals in 2011, striking out 119 batters over 124 2/3 innings of work, posting a season record of 4–6 with a 4.11 ERA. Paulio started the 2012 season on the disabled list with right elbow strain, but after missing the first 6 games he came back to post a 3–1 with a 1.67 ERA over seven starts. It was during the seventh start that Paulino experienced major elbow problems, and was placed back on the disabled list on June 9. On June 22, it was announced that he would miss the rest of the 2012 season due to a torn UCL. He underwent ulnar collateral ligament replacement, (aka Tommy John surgery) on July 3, 2012.

The Royals signed Paulino to a one-year, $1.75 million contract on November 29, 2012. He began the 2013 season on the 60-day disabled list as he was still recovering from the Tommy John surgery he previously had. He began throwing sessions as part of his rehabilitation and began pitching in the minor leagues in May, but never pitched for the Royals in 2013. He was designated for assignment on November 20, 2013, and chose to become a free agent.

=== Chicago White Sox ===
On December 9, 2013, the White Sox signed Paulino to a one-year deal worth $1.75 million with a team option for 2015.

=== Boston Red Sox ===
On January 27, 2015, Paulino signed a minor league contract with the Boston Red Sox. He was released on March 31.

=== Chicago Cubs ===
On May 11, 2015, Paulino signed a minor league contract with the Chicago Cubs. He elected free agency following the season on November 6.

=== 2015 WBSC Premier12 ===
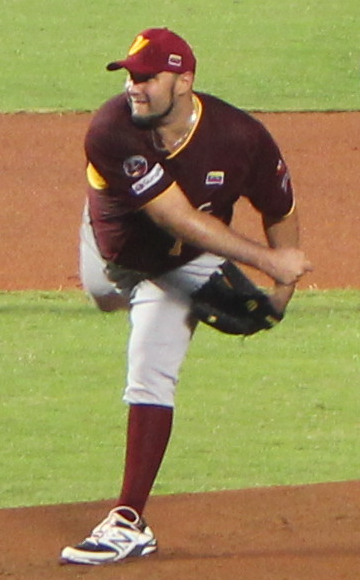
Paulino with the Venezuela national team in 2015 WBSC Premier12 warm-up game

In November 2015, Paulino participated with the Venezuela national team in the inaugural WBSC Premier12.

=== Cleveland Indians ===
On December 1, 2015, Paulino signed a minor league deal with the Cleveland Indians. He was released on May 28, 2016.

=== Saitama Seibu Lions ===
On May 31, 2016, Paulino signed a one-year contract worth 60 million Yen with the Saitama Seibu Lions of Nippon Professional Baseball. He became a free agent following the season.

=== Sugar Land Skeeters ===
On March 29, 2017, Paulino signed with the Sugar Land Skeeters of the Atlantic League of Professional Baseball.

=== Saraperos de Saltillo ===
On May 25, 2017, Paulino's contract was purchased by the Saraperos de Saltillo of the Mexican Baseball League. He was released on July 25, 2017. In 20 games (1 start) he threw 25.2 innings struggling mightily going 3-2 with a 7.01 ERA with 21 strikeouts and 6 saves.

=== Sugar Land Skeeters (Second stint) ===
On July 30, 2017, Paulino signed with the Sugar Land Skeeters of the Atlantic League of Professional Baseball. In 39 games 41 innings of relief he went 4-5 with a 1.98 ERA with 50 strikeouts and 16 saves.

On March 28, 2018, Paulino re-signed a new contract for the 2018 season. In 54 games 53.1 innings of relief he went 2-2 with a 1.18 ERA with 72 strikeouts and 33 saves.

On March 25, 2018, Paulino re-signed a new contract for the 2019 season.

=== Houston Astros (Second stint) ===
On June 17, 2019, Paulino's contract was purchased by the Houston Astros and he was assigned to the Triple-A Round Rock Express. On August 29, 2019, he requested and was later granted his release from the organization so that he could return to Sugar Land for the 2019 Atlantic League playoffs.

=== Sugar Land Skeeters (Third stint) ===
On August 29, 2019, Paulino re-signed with the Sugar Land Skeeters of the Atlantic League of Professional Baseball. In total in 2019 he appeared in 26 games 26.1 innings of relief going 2-1 with a 3.08 ERA with 37 strikeouts and 15 saves.

In July 2020, Paulino signed on to play for the Skeeters in the Constellation Energy League (a makeshift 4-team independent league created as a result of the COVID-19 pandemic) for the 2020 season. He became a free agent following the season. In 4 games 3 innings of relief he struggled immensely going 0-1 with a 12.00 ERA going 2 strikeouts.

== Pitching style ==
Paulino throws two hard fastballs, a four-seamer at 93–97 mph and a two-seam fastball at 95–98 mph. His secondary pitch is a slider at 85–88. He also has a curveball (77–80) and changeup (85–87). His curve and change are used primarily against left-handed hitters.
