= Luis Santos (baseball) =

Dominican baseball player (born 1991)

Free agent
- Pitcher
- Born: February 11, 1991 (age 35); Bonao, Dominican Republic
- Bats: Right Throws: Right

MLB debut
- September 2, 2017, for the Toronto Blue Jays

MLB statistics (through 2018 Season)
- Win–loss record: 1–2
- Earned run average: 4.97
- Strikeouts: 31
- Stats at Baseball Reference

Teams
- Toronto Blue Jays (2017–2018)

Luis Gustavo Santos Paulino (born February 11, 1991) is a Dominican professional baseball pitcher who is a free agent. He has previously played in Major League Baseball (MLB) for the Toronto Blue Jays.

== Professional career ==
=== Pittsburgh Pirates ===
Santos signed with the Pittsburgh Pirates organization as an international free agent in 2011. Assigned to the Dominican Summer League Pirates, he pitched to a 2–1 win–loss record, 2.70 earned run average (ERA), and 23 strikeouts in 23 1/3 innings. In 2012, he played for both of Pittsburgh's DSL affiliates, and posted a combined 6–3 record, 2.44 ERA, and 74 strikeouts in 62 2/3 innings pitched.

=== Kansas City Royals ===
During the offseason, Santos was traded, along with Luis Rico, to the Kansas City Royals for Clint Robinson and Vin Mazzaro. He split the season between the Rookie-level Burlington Royals and the Rookie Advanced Idaho Falls Chukars. In total, Santos made 10 starts and went 7–1 with a 1.97 ERA and 47 strikeouts. Santos began the 2014 campaign with the Single-A Lexington Legends, and was promoted to the High-A Wilmington Blue Rocks at mid-season. In 118 total innings, Santos pitched to an 8–5 win–loss record, 3.74 ERA, and 86 strikeouts. In the offseason, he pitched for the Toros del Este of the Dominican Winter League.

On April 2, 2015, Santos was released by the Royals.

=== Toronto Blue Jays ===
He signed a minor league contract with the Toronto Blue Jays on April 6 and was assigned to the Advanced-A Dunedin Blue Jays. He spent the entire season with Dunedin, going 6–6 with a 4.55 ERA and 86 strikeouts in 93 innings. Santos split the 2016 season with Dunedin and the Double-A New Hampshire Fisher Cats. In a career-high 127 innings pitched, he posted a 9–4 record, 3.97 ERA, and 117 strikeouts. Santos continued his progression through the Toronto minor league system, spending the majority of 2017 with the Triple-A Buffalo Bisons. He went 3–13 with a 4.16 ERA and 102 strikeouts in 114 2/3 innings.

On September 2, 2017, Santos was called up by the Blue Jays. He made his MLB debut that night, pitching 3 1/3 innings in Toronto's 7–2 win over the Baltimore Orioles. He was outrighted to Triple-A on November 6, 2017, and elected free agency the following day. On December 4, Santos signed a minor league contract with the Blue Jays that included an invitation to spring training.

Santos was recalled on May 3, 2018, for the second game of a doubleheader in Cleveland. He was designated for assignment the following day, and re-added to the active roster on July 4. Santos declared free agency on October 9, 2018.

=== Tampa Bay Rays ===
On December 19, 2018, Santos signed a minor league contract with the Tampa Bay Rays. He made 32 appearances for the Triple–A Durham Bulls in 2019, compiling a 3–2 record and 4.90 ERA with 74 strikeouts across 64 1/3 innings pitched. Santos elected free agency following the season on November 4, 2019.

On February 4, 2020, Santos signed with the Guerreros de Oaxaca of the Mexican League. Santos did not play in a game in 2020 due to the cancellation of the Mexican League season because of the COVID-19 pandemic. On November 18, 2020, Santos was released by the Guerreros.

=== Saraperos de Saltillo ===
On May 5, 2021, Santos signed with the Saraperos de Saltillo of the Mexican League. In 10 games (9 starts) for Saltillo, he compiled a 4–1 record and 4.68 ERA with 47 strikeouts across 42 1/3 innings pitched.

Santos did not appear in a game for the Saraperos in 2022 and became a free agent following the season.

=== Pericos de Puebla ===
On May 11, 2023, Santos signed with the Pericos de Puebla of the Mexican League. In 34 relief appearances for the team, he registered a 3.53 ERA with 40 strikeouts across 35 2/3 innings of work. With Puebla, Santos won the Serie del Rey.

Santos made 34 appearances for Puebla in 2024, compiling a 1–3 record and 6.10 ERA with 25 strikeouts across 31 innings pitched. On November 21, 2024, Santos was released by the Pericos.

=== Caliente de Durango ===
On May 14, 2025, Santos signed with the Caliente de Durango of the Mexican League. In 25 appearances for Durango, he struggled to a 1–6 record and 9.55 ERA with 18 strikeouts across 21 2/3 innings pitched. Santos was released by the Caliente on July 10.
