= Irving Falú =

Puerto Rican baseball player (born 1983)

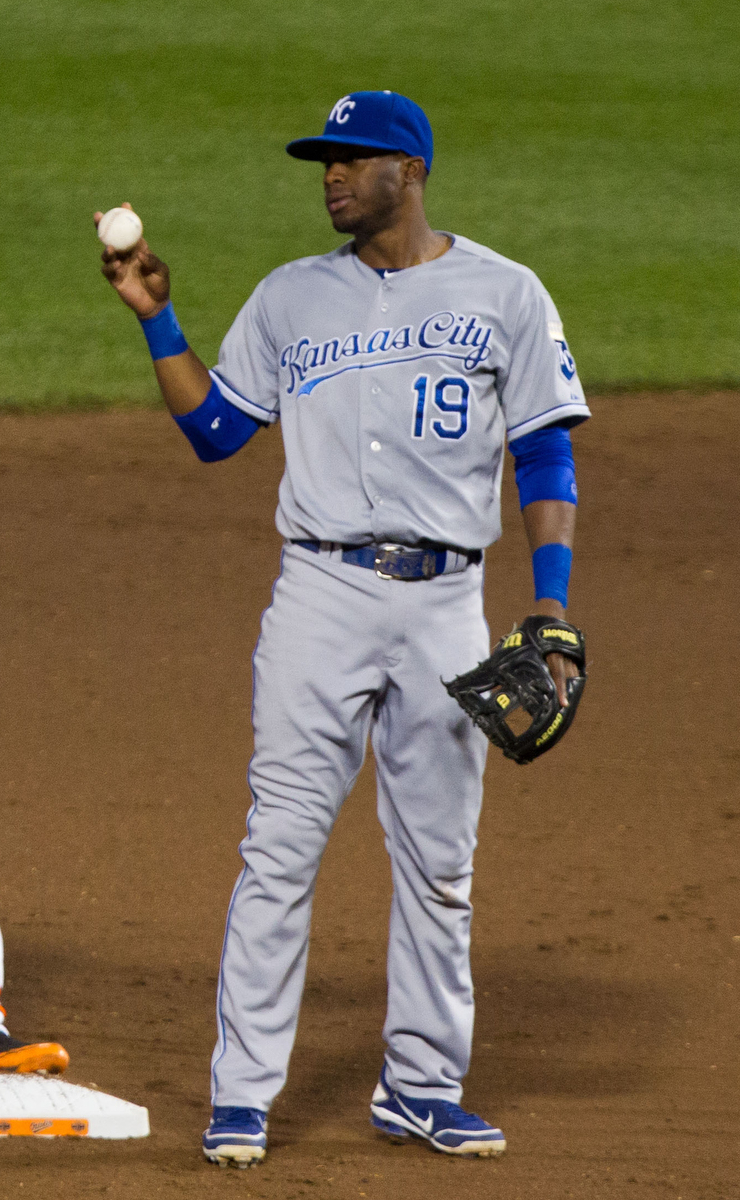
- Falú with the Kansas City Royals in 2012
- Second baseman
- Born: June 6, 1983 (age 43); Hato Rey, Puerto Rico
- Batted: Switch Threw: Right

MLB debut
- May 6, 2012, for the Kansas City Royals

Last MLB appearance
- July 12, 2014, for the San Diego Padres

MLB statistics
- Batting average: .277
- Home runs: 0
- Runs batted in: 8
- Stats at Baseball Reference

Teams
- Kansas City Royals (2012–2013); Milwaukee Brewers (2014); San Diego Padres (2014)
Medals
Representing Puerto Rico
Men's baseball
World Baseball Classic
Silver medal – second place	2013 San Francisco	Team

Irving Falú (born June 6, 1983) is a Puerto Rican former professional baseball infielder. He played in Major League Baseball (MLB) for the Kansas City Royals, Milwaukee Brewers, and San Diego Padres from 2012 to 2014.

== Playing career ==
=== Kansas City Royals ===
After playing college baseball at Indian Hills Community College in Iowa, the Kansas City Royals selected Falú in the 21st round of the 2003 Major League Baseball draft. He was called up to the major league level for the first time on May 3, 2012. Falú made his debut on May 6 against the New York Yankees at shortstop, and hit a triple in his first major league at-bat, as well as a base hit with his second at bat. He played in 24 games for the Royals during his rookie campaign, hitting .341/.371/.435 with seven RBI.

Falú made only one appearance for Kansas City the following season, going 1-for-4 (.250) in a game against the Chicago White Sox on September 29, 2013. The majority of his time was spent with the Triple-A Omaha Storm Chasers, for whom he batted .256/.320/.329 with two home runs, 31 RBI, and 20 stolen bases. Falú was released by the Royals on November 25.

=== Milwaukee Brewers ===
Falú signed a minor league contract with the Milwaukee Brewers on December 4, 2013. He was assigned to the Triple-A Nashville Sounds to begin the regular season. On May 25, 2014, the Brewers selected Falú's contract, adding him to their active roster.

=== San Diego Padres ===
Falú was claimed off waivers by the San Diego Padres on June 26, 2014. He made 11 appearances for San Diego, going 3-for-20 (.150) with one stolen base.

=== Milwaukee Brewers (second stint) ===
On July 17, 2014, Falú was claimed off waivers by the Milwaukee Brewers. He made 11 total appearances for Milwaukee, going 0-for-10 with one RBI.

=== Cincinnati Reds ===
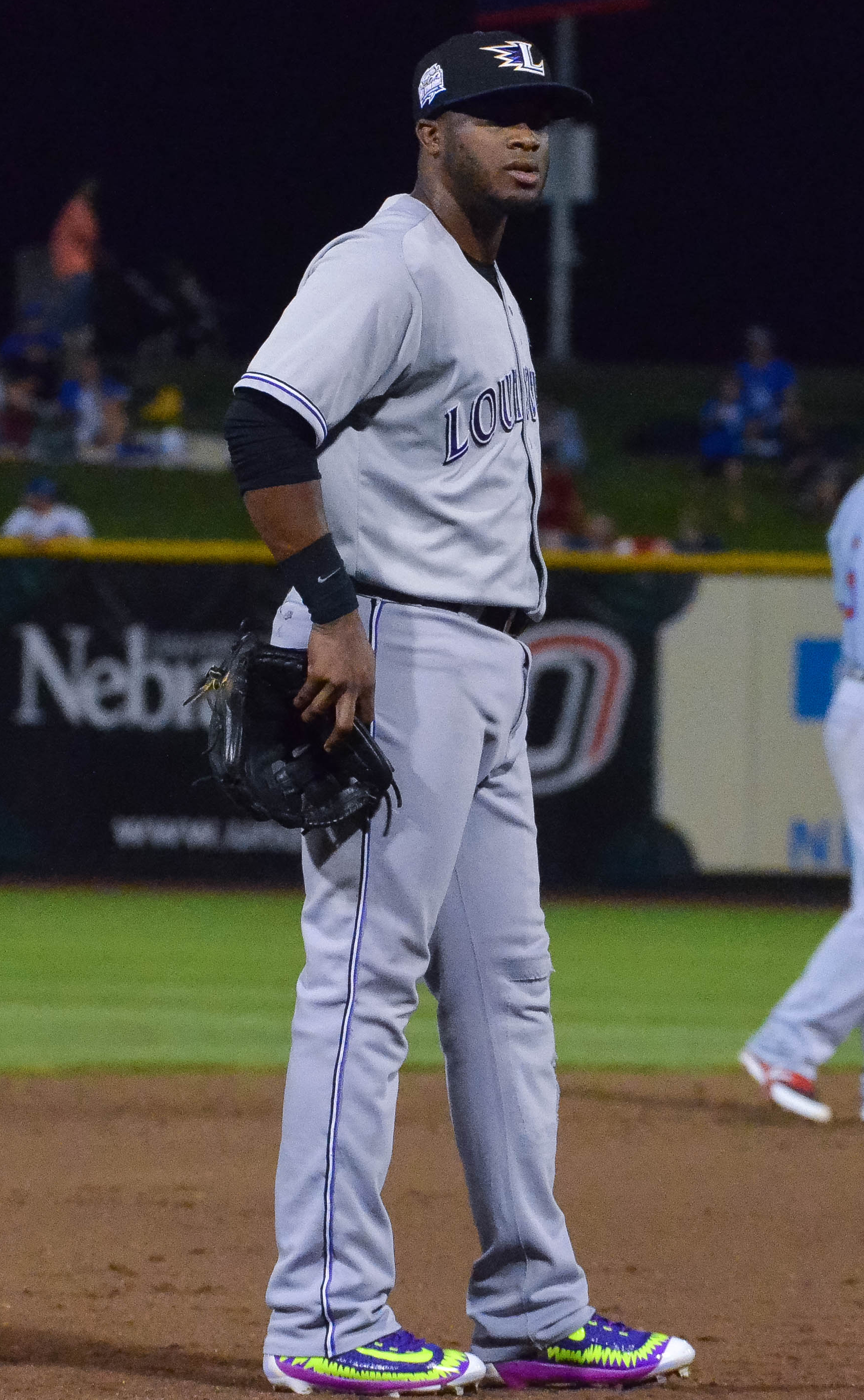
Falú at the 2015 Triple-A All-Star Game

On December 3, 2014, Falú signed a minor league contract with the Cincinnati Reds, and was assigned to the Double–A Pensacola Blue Wahoos. He instead spent the 2015 campaign with the Triple–A Louisville Bats, hitting .270/.337/.350 with three home runs, 43 RBI, and 19 stolen bases across 121 games. Falú elected free agency on November 6, 2015.

=== Guerreros de Oaxaca ===
On March 4, 2016, Falú signed with the Guerreros de Oaxaca of the Mexican League. Falú made 52 appearances for Oaxaca, slashing .359/.410/.478 with five home runs, 31 RBI, and nine stolen bases.

=== Kansas City Royals ===
On June 5, 2016, Falú signed a minor league contract with the Kansas City Royals organization. In 46 games for the Triple–A Omaha Storm Chasers, he batted .267/.297/.404 with four home runs and 27 RBI. Falú elected free agency following the season on November 7.

=== Washington Nationals ===
On January 12, 2017, Falú signed a minor league contract with the Washington Nationals. He played in 119 games for the Triple-A Syracuse Chiefs, batting .280/.333/.406 with nine home runs, 44 RBI, and six stolen bases.

Falú re–signed with Washington on a new minor league contract on October 31, 2017. He spent the entirety of the 2018 season with Triple–A Syracuse, playing in 108 games and hitting .276/.337/.360 with four home runs, 53 RBI, and 12 stolen bases. Falú elected free agency following the season on November 2, 2018.

== Coaching career ==
In 2025, Falú was named as the bench coach for the Dominican Summer League Royals, the summer league affiliate of the Kansas City Royals.

== Personal life ==
Falú is the cousin of former Royals player and Boston Red Sox first base coach Luis Alicea.

His brother, Melvin Falú, was selected by the St. Louis Cardinals in the 28th round of the 2002 MLB June Amateur Draft from Southern Arkansas University in Magnolia, Arkansas.

== See also ==
- List of Major League Baseball players from Puerto Rico
