= Clint Robinson (baseball) =

American baseball player (born 1985)

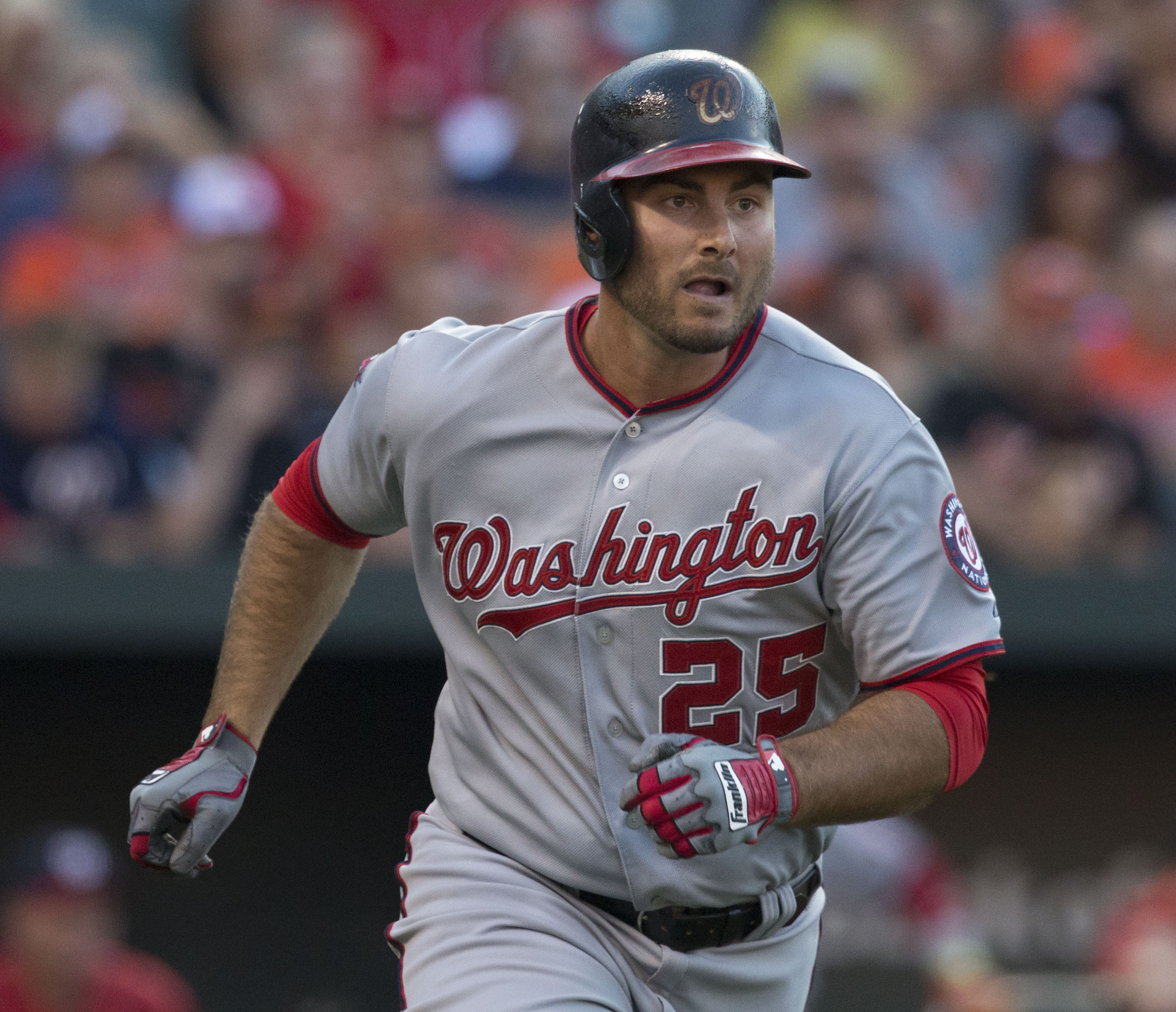
- Robinson with the Washington Nationals
- First baseman / Outfielder
- Born: February 16, 1985 (age 41); Jefferson City, Missouri, U.S.
- Batted: Left Threw: Left

MLB debut
- June 8, 2012, for the Kansas City Royals

Last MLB appearance
- October 2, 2016, for the Washington Nationals

MLB statistics
- Batting average: .257
- Home runs: 15
- Runs batted in: 62
- Stats at Baseball Reference

Teams
- Kansas City Royals (2012); Los Angeles Dodgers (2014); Washington Nationals (2015–2016)

Clinton Michael Robinson (born February 16, 1985) is an American former professional baseball first baseman and outfielder. He played in Major League Baseball (MLB) for the Kansas City Royals, Los Angeles Dodgers, and Washington Nationals.

Robinson was selected by the Royals in the 25th round (756th overall) of the 2007 Major League Baseball draft.

== Early career ==
A standout at Northview High School in Dothan, Alabama, Clint Robinson decided to play college baseball at Troy University where he became a member of the Sigma Alpha Epsilon fraternity. During his time at Troy he set team records for games played, at-bats, runs scored, hits, total bases, and hit-by-pitches. After a promising junior season cut short by an injury in 2006, Robinson went on to lead his team in seven statistical categories as a senior. That 2007 season he hit .364 with 1.110 OPS, 17 HR, and a .973 fielding percentage.

== Professional career ==
=== Kansas City Royals ===
In his first season with the Kansas City Royals organization in 2007, Robinson emerged as a leader with the Idaho Falls Chukars, earning Pioneer League MVP, Postseason All-Star, and Idaho Falls Player of the Year honors. After an active 2008 season with the Single-A Burlington Bees, Robinson went to High-A with the Wilmington Blue Rocks, finishing second for the Carolina League Batting Title. Additionally, Robinson took home the 2009 Mike Sweeney Award, which is awarded to the player that best represents the Royals organization both on and off the field.

In July 2010, with the Northwest Arkansas Naturals, he was in the top three of all Texas League players in almost every offensive statistical category. After a franchise record 21 game hitting streak Robinson earned Texas League All-Star and Player of the Month (June, 2010) honors.

Robinson had a breakout year in 2011 with the Triple A Omaha Storm Chasers, posting a .326 batting average with 23 home runs and 100 RBI. His numbers fell off in 2012 however, as he hit 13 homers with 67 RBI and a .292 batting average. Robinson was also called up to the major league club for the first time in 2012, making four plate appearances as a pinch hitter in interleague play, striking out two of the times, with no hits. On November 20, 2012 the Royals designated Robinson for assignment as they cleared space on the 40-man roster ahead of the Rule 5 draft.

=== Toronto Blue Jays ===
On November 28, 2012, Robinson was traded to the Pittsburgh Pirates with pitcher Vin Mazzaro in exchange for right-handed pitcher Luis Santos and left-hander Luis Rico. On March 27, 2013, Robinson was designated for assignment by the Pirates. Two days later, he was claimed by the Toronto Blue Jays, and optioned to their Double-A affiliate New Hampshire Fisher Cats. He was designated for assignment by the Blue Jays on May 29, and assigned outright to the Fisher Cats on May 30. He was promoted to the Triple-A Buffalo Bisons on July 9. In 111 games between the two levels, he hit .254 with 13 homers and 55 RBI.

=== Los Angeles Dodgers ===
Robinson signed a minor league contract with the Los Angeles Dodgers on November 18, 2013 and was assigned to the Triple-A Albuquerque Isotopes. The Dodgers purchased his contract and called him up to the Majors on June 25, 2014. His first Major League hit was a game winning pinch-hit RBI single off of Corey Kluber of the Cleveland Indians on June 30. In nine games with the Dodgers, all but one of them as a pinch hitter, he had three hits in nine at-bats, with two RBI. He was designated for assignment on July 10. In 119 games with the Isotopes, he hit .312 with 18 home runs and 80 RBI. Robinson elected free agency on October 12.

=== Washington Nationals ===
He signed with the Washington Nationals on a minor league contract on December 26, 2014. He wound up making the Nationals opening day roster. On May 12, 2015, Robinson made his major league pitching debut against the Arizona Diamondbacks at Chase Field, throwing a scoreless frame in relief and striking out Aaron Hill on three pitches. He was the first Nationals position player called upon to pitch in a regular-season game. He hit his first major league home run on June 11, off Matt Garza of the Milwaukee Brewers. At the end of spring training 2017, Robinson was placed on waivers by the Nationals after losing his spot on the roster to Adam Lind. He was not claimed by any team and accepted an outright assignment to the Triple-A Syracuse Chiefs of the International League.

== Retirement ==
Following the 2017 season, Robinson retired from playing professional baseball and accepted a position as a baseball scout for the Miami Marlins.

== Awards and honors ==
- May 12, 2015 pitched one inning of scoreless relief.
- 2010 Texas League Triple Crown Winner
- Texas League Player of the Week three times.
- Texas League Player of the Month twice.
- Selected to the Mid-Season All-Star Team and Post-Season All-Star Team.
- Named Northwest Arkansas Naturals Player of the Year.
- Named Northwest Arkansas Naturals Unsung Hero in 2010.
- 2009 Mike Sweeney Award
