= Vin Mazzaro =

American baseball pitcher (born 1986)

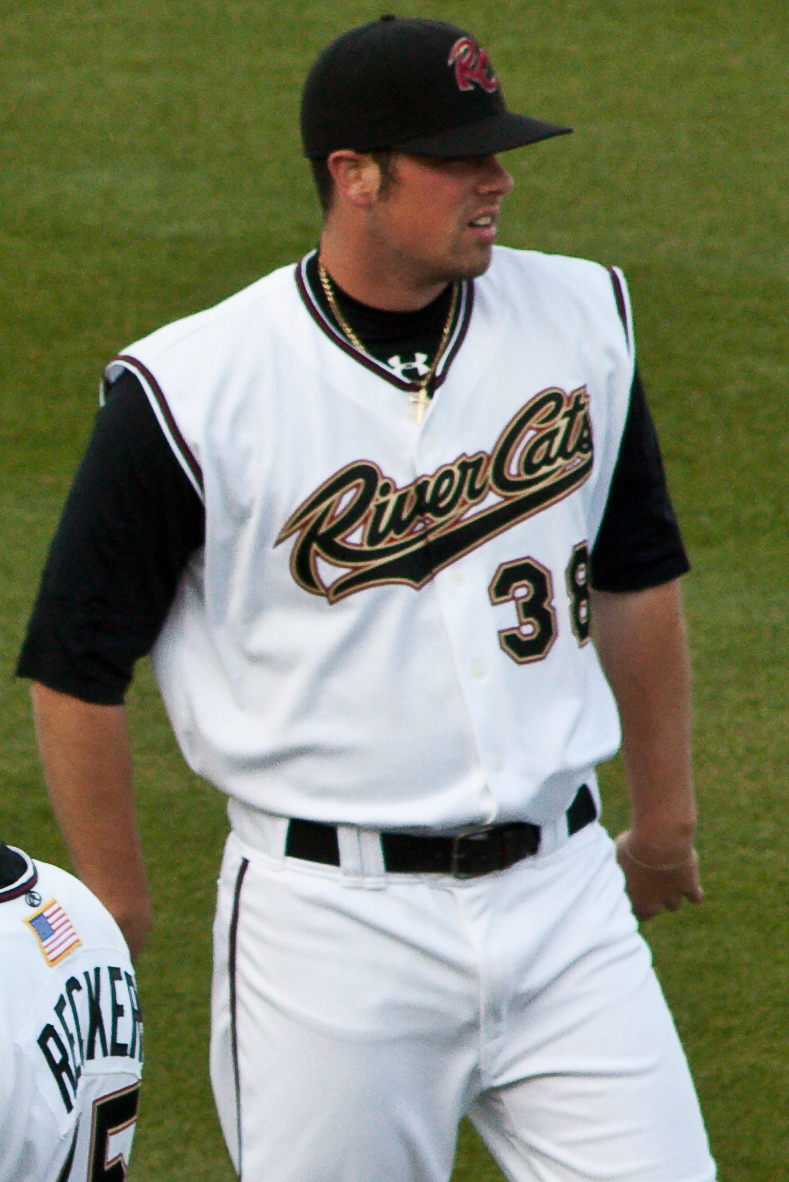
- Mazzaro with the Sacramento River Cats
- Pitcher
- Born: September 27, 1986 (age 40); Hackensack, New Jersey, U.S.
- Batted: Right Threw: Right

MLB debut
- June 2, 2009, for the Oakland Athletics

Last MLB appearance
- May 5, 2016, for the San Francisco Giants

MLB statistics
- Win–loss record: 24–23
- Earned run average: 4.79
- Strikeouts: 233
- Stats at Baseball Reference

Teams
- Oakland Athletics (2009–2010); Kansas City Royals (2011–2012); Pittsburgh Pirates (2013–2014); Miami Marlins (2015); San Francisco Giants (2016)

Vincent Michael Mazzaro (born September 27, 1986) is an American former professional baseball pitcher. He has previously played in Major League Baseball (MLB) for the Oakland Athletics, Kansas City Royals, Pittsburgh Pirates, Miami Marlins, and San Francisco Giants.

== Early years ==
Mazzaro grew up in Rutherford, New Jersey, and attended Rutherford High School, where he led the team to two consecutive state championships.

== Professional career ==
=== Oakland Athletics ===
Mazzaro was drafted by the Oakland Athletics in the third round of the 2005 Major League Baseball draft.

In December 2008, Baseball America named Mazzaro the #8 prospect in Oakland's organization.

Mazzaro made his major league debut on June 2, 2009 against the Chicago White Sox. He earned the victory after pitching 6 1/3 innings without allowing a run.

=== Kansas City Royals ===
Mazzaro was traded along with minor league pitcher Justin Marks to the Kansas City Royals for David DeJesus on November 10, 2010. After starting the 2011 season with the Omaha Storm Chasers, he was recalled by the Royals to replace the injured Bruce Chen on May 10.

He surrendered 14 runs in 2 1/3 innings in an emergency appearance out of the bullpen in a 19–1 loss to the Cleveland Indians at Kauffman Stadium on May 16, 2011. Besides setting a new franchise record for most runs yielded in a game, he became the first pitcher in the modern era (since 1900) to allow that many without pitching 3 innings. His 14 earned runs given up was also the most by a relief pitcher since Les McCrabb of the Philadelphia Athletics allowed the same amount in four innings in a 19–4 defeat to the Boston Red Sox on April 16, 1942. Originally scheduled to be the starter the following night, Mazzaro was optioned back to the Storm Chasers after the game. Mazzaro was called back to Kansas City on June 7 after Royals starting pitcher Sean O'Sullivan was placed on the disabled list. The following year, he finished the season with an overall record of 4–3 with a 5.73 ERA in 18 games, primarily in relief. On November 20, 2012, the Royals designated Mazzaro for assignment as they cleared room on the 40-man roster ahead of the Rule 5 draft.

=== Pittsburgh Pirates ===
On November 28, 2012, Mazzaro was traded to the Pittsburgh Pirates with first baseman Clint Robinson in exchange for right-handed pitcher Luis Santos and left-hander Luis Rico. Santos and Rico both pitched in the Dominican Summer League in 2012. Mazzaro had the best season of his career with the Pirates in 2013, pitching to the tune of an 8-2 record with a 2.81 ERA and 46 strikeouts in 73 2/3 innings pitched across 57 games, exclusively out of the bullpen.

Mazzaro was designated for assignment on March 29, 2014, and assigned outright to the Triple-A Indianapolis Indians on April 8.

On May 26, 2014, Mazzaro was designated for assignment again in order for Brandon Cumpton to be called up. He elected free agency in October 2014.

=== Miami Marlins ===
On January 21, 2015, the Miami Marlins announced that they had signed Mazzaro to a minor league deal. He split 21 games between Miami and the New Orleans Zephyrs.

=== Atlanta Braves ===
Mazzaro signed a minor league deal with the Atlanta Braves on July 10, 2015. He was assigned to the Gwinnett Braves.

=== San Francisco Giants ===
Mazzaro signed a minor league deal with the San Francisco Giants on January 11, 2016. On April 30, 2016, Mazzaro was called to the major league roster in order to replace the struggling Mike Broadway. On May 5, 2016, Mazzaro gave up nine runs, while pitching 1/3 of an inning against the Colorado Rockies. Then next day he was designated for assignment to make room for Albert Suarez.

=== Somerset Patriots ===
On May 9, 2017, Mazzaro signed with the Somerset Patriots of the Atlantic League of Professional Baseball. In 3 games (2 starts) 6 innings he went 0-0 with a 0.00 era and 6 strikeouts.

=== Cincinnati Reds ===
Mazzaro signed a minor league deal with the Cincinnati Reds on May 18, 2017. He made only 2 starts for the Triple–A Louisville Bats, allowing 13 runs (12 earned) on 13 hits and 3 walks with 3 strikeouts in 4 1/3 innings pitched. Mazzaro elected free agency following the season on November 6.

=== New Jersey Jackals ===
On May 6, 2018, Mazzaro signed with the New Jersey Jackals of the independent Can-Am League. In 34 games 46 innings of relief he went 3-4 with a 1.76 era, 44 strikeouts and 10 saves.

=== Long Island Ducks ===
On April 9, 2019, Mazzaro was traded to the Long Island Ducks of the Atlantic League of Professional Baseball. He won the 2019 ALPB championship with Long Island. He re-signed with the Ducks for the 2020 season on February 18, 2020. Mazzaro did not play in a game in for the team due to the cancellation of the 2020 ALPB season because of the COVID-19 pandemic and became a free agent after the year. With the season on hold, he participated in the SOMERSET Professional Baseball Series, hosted by the Somerset Patriots, during which he played for the New Jersey Blasters. On April 20, 2021, Mazzaro re-signed with the Ducks for the 2021 season. Mazzaro retired from professional baseball on September 9, 2021.

=== Sussex County Miners ===
On May 6, 2022, Mazzaro came out of retirement and signed with the Sussex County Miners of the Frontier League. In 16 starts 83 innings he went 5-6 with a 4.99 era and 72 strikeouts.

=== New Jersey Jackals (second stint) ===
On December 21, 2022, Mazzaro signed with the New Jersey Jackals of the Frontier League. In 8 starts for New Jersey, he posted a 4–1 record and 3.27 ERA with 56 strikeouts across 41 1/3 innings pitched. On March 5, 2024, Mazzaro was released by the Jackals.
