= Francisley Bueno =

Cuban baseball pitcher (born 1981)

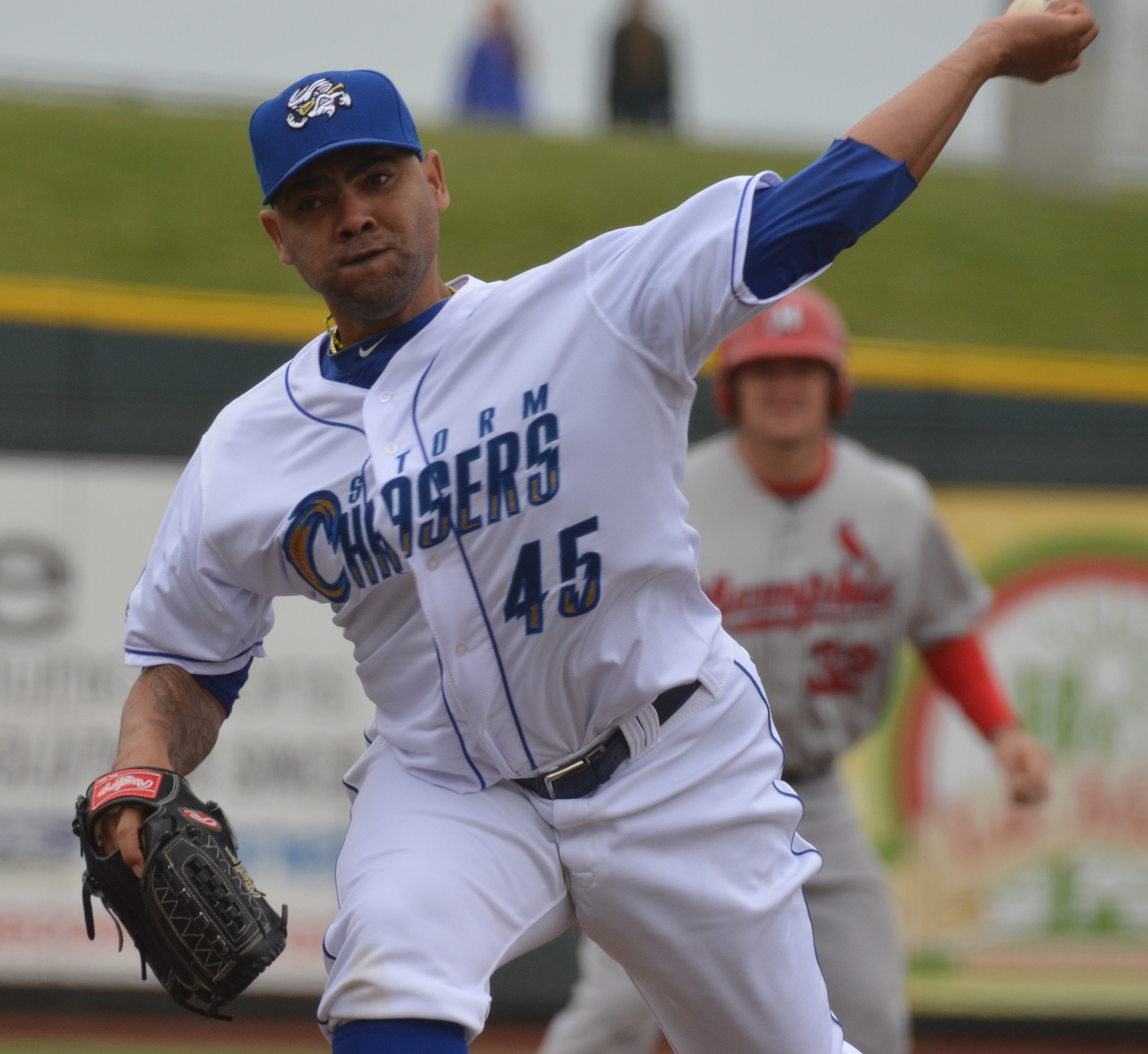
- Bueno with the Omaha Storm Chasers in 2013
- Pitcher
- Born: March 5, 1981 (age 45); Havana, Cuba
- Batted: Left Threw: Left

Professional debut
- MLB: August 13, 2008, for the Atlanta Braves
- KBO: 2010, for the Hanwha Eagles

Last appearance
- MLB: September 24, 2014, for the Kansas City Royals
- KBO: 2010, for the Hanwha Eagles

MLB statistics
- Win–loss record: 2–1
- Earned run average: 2.98
- Strikeouts: 33

KBO statistics
- Win–loss record: 1–3
- Earned run average: 9.10
- Strikeouts: 23
- Stats at Baseball Reference

Teams
- Atlanta Braves (2008); Hanwha Eagles (2010); Kansas City Royals (2012–2014)

Francisley Trueba Bueno (born March 5, 1981) is a Cuban former professional baseball pitcher. He played in Major League Baseball (MLB) for the Atlanta Braves and Kansas City Royals and in the KBO League for the Hanwha Eagles. He is a childhood friend of Yunel Escobar and Brayan Peña, who was also a 2012 player on the Kansas City Royals.

== Career ==
=== Atlanta Braves ===
Bueno, a Cuban defector, was signed as a free agent by the Atlanta Braves and assigned to the Double–A Mississippi Braves for 2006. In 17 games for Mississippi, he had a 3.60 earned run average (ERA) and 84 strikeouts. He started 2007 with Mississippi again, but received a late-season promotion to the Triple–A Richmond Braves.

After beginning 2008 with Triple–A Richmond, Bueno was called up to the majors on August 3 and made his debut on August 13, during which he nearly hit Alfonso Soriano in the chin, only innings after Soriano show-boated after hitting a long fly ball off Bueno, jumping and celebrating out of the box, only to be left with a single as the ball bounced off the left field wall. Bueno was ejected, along with bench coach Chino Cadahia. A day later, Bueno was given a fine and three-day suspension by Major League Baseball. Bueno will appeal the fine and suspension, and will only have to serve his final sentence once he returns to the Major Leagues. The situation escalated in the final game of the Braves-Cubs series, when Ted Lilly hit Escobar, prompting a shouting match between the two, and the benches and bullpens to clear, but no fight took place, nor ejections made. He became a free agent following the 2009 season.

=== Diablos Rojos del México ===
On June 1, 2010, Bueno signed with the Diablos Rojos del México of the Mexican League. In 9 games (8 starts) he threw 43.1 innings going 4-2 with a 4.36 ERA and 37 strikeouts.

=== Hanwha Eagles ===
On August 5, 2010, Bueno signed a contract lasting until the end of the season with the Hanwha Eagles of the KBO League.

=== Sultanes de Monterrey ===
On April 27, 2011, Bueno signed with the Sultanes de Monterrey of the Mexican League. He became a free agent following the season. In 15 starts he threw 84.2 innings going 7-5 with a 4.15 ERA and 59 strikeouts.

=== Kansas City Royals ===
On November 12, 2011, Bueno signed a minor league contract with the Kansas City Royals. He was called up on June 23. He was sent back to the Omaha Storm Chasers on June 27. He was designated for assignment on June 25, 2013. He cleared waivers and was sent outright to Triple-A on July 5. He had his contract selected to the major league roster for a second time on August 8. He was non-tendered and became a free agent on December 2, 2014.

=== Chicago Cubs ===
On January 17, 2015, Bueno signed a minor league deal with the Chicago Cubs. He was released on April 4.

=== Sultanes de Monterrey (second stint) ===
On May 21, 2015, Bueno signed with the Sultanes de Monterrey of the Mexican League He was released on June 30. In 5 starts he threw 27.2 innings goaning 3-1 with a 4.55 ERA and 20 strikeouts.

=== Tigres de Quintana Roo ===
On June 11, 2016, Bueno signed with the Tigres de Quintana Roo of the Mexican League. In 10 starts he threw 52 innings going 7-1 with a 2.08 ERA and 35 strikeouts. He was released on March 29, 2017.

=== Generales de Durango ===
On May 20, 2017, Bueno signed with the Generales de Durango of the Mexican League. In 12 games (11 starts) he threw 58.1 innings going 3-2 with a 4.47 ERA and 35 strikeouts.

He re-signed with the team on April 20, 2018. Bueno was released on July 12. In 7 starts he threw 34.1 innings going 0-5 with a 5.77 ERA and 30 strikeouts.

== Pitching style ==
Bueno throws five pitches — a four-seam and two-seam fastball in the low 90s, a changeup in the mid 80s, a slider in the low 80s, and a curveball in the upper 70s.

== See also ==
- List of baseball players who defected from Cuba
