= Ryan Verdugo =

American baseball player (born 1987)

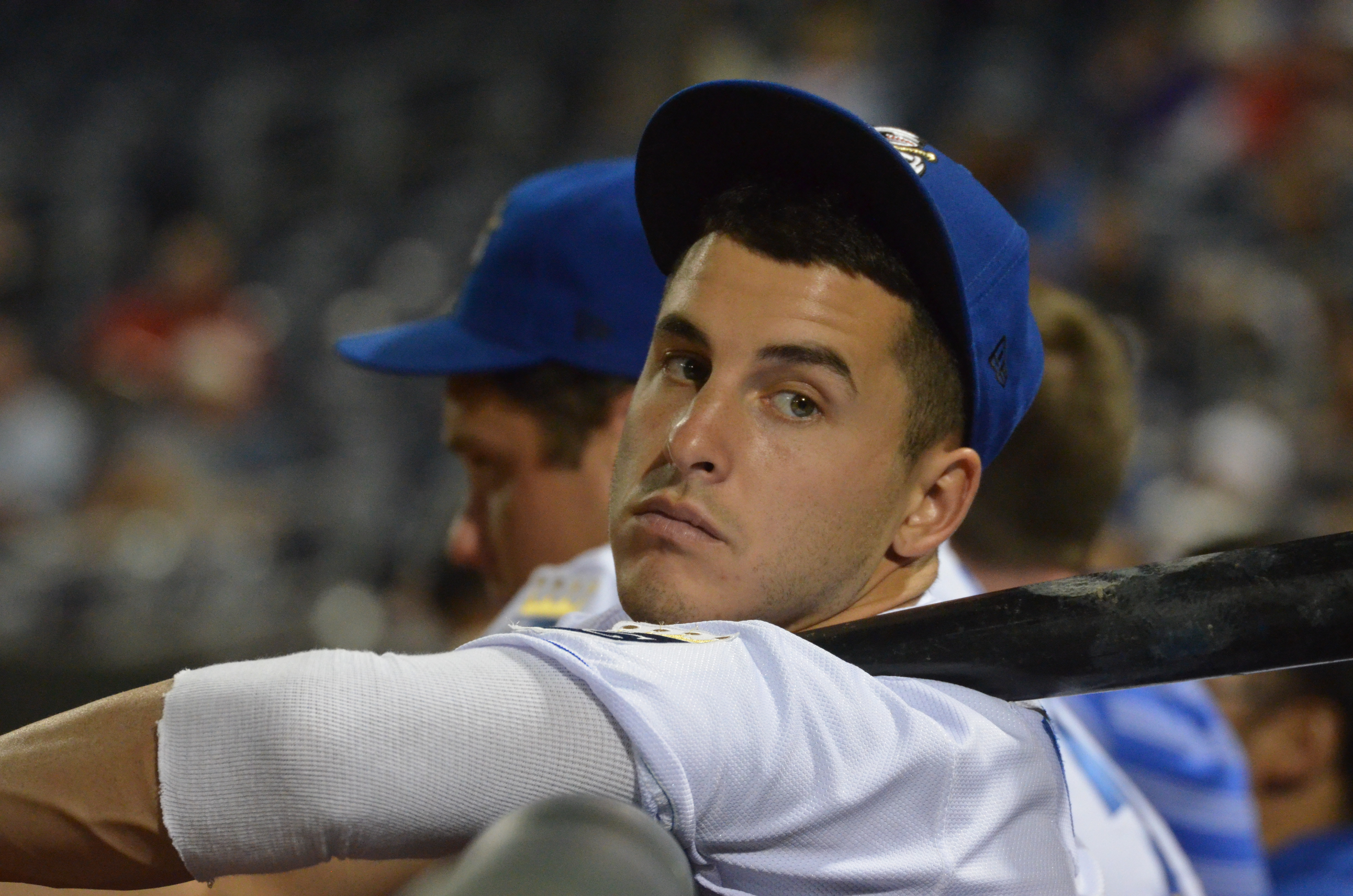
- Verdugo with the Omaha Storm Chasers in 2013
- Pitcher
- Born: April 10, 1987 (age 38); Pasadena, California, U.S.
- Batted: Left Threw: Left

Professional debut
- MLB: July 17, 2012, for the Kansas City Royals
- CPBL: March 29, 2018, for the Uni-President Lions

Last appearance
- MLB: July 17, 2012, for the Kansas City Royals
- CPBL: September 28, 2019, for the Uni-President Lions

MLB statistics
- Win–loss record: 0–1
- Earned run average: 32.40
- Strikeouts: 2

CPBL statistics
- Win–loss record: 14–13
- Earned run average: 5.07
- Strikeouts: 216
- Stats at Baseball Reference

Teams
- Kansas City Royals (2012); Uni-President Lions (2018–2019)

Career highlights and awards
- CPBL: Pitched a perfect game on October 7, 2018
Medals
Men's baseball
Representing Mexico
2019 WBSC Premier12
| Bronze medal – third place | 2019 Tokyo | National team |

Ryan L. Verdugo (born April 10, 1987) is a Mexican-American former professional baseball pitcher. He played in Major League Baseball (MLB) for the Kansas City Royals and in the Chinese Professional Baseball League (CPBL) for the Uni-President Lions.

== Career ==
Verdugo attended Lake Stevens High School in Lake Stevens, Washington. He was chosen by the Philadelphia Phillies in the 43rd round of the 2005 Major League Baseball draft, but did not sign. Verdugo then attended Skagit Valley College for two years. He was drafted by the San Francisco Giants in the 47th round of the 2007 Major League Baseball draft, but again did not sign.

Verdugo transferred to Louisiana State University (LSU) for his junior season, where he played for the LSU Tigers baseball team.

=== San Francisco Giants ===
Following the 2008 season, Verdugo was again drafted by the Giants in the 9th round (267th overall) of the 2008 Major League Baseball draft, and signed. He split his first professional season between the rookie-level Arizona League Giants and Low-A Salem-Keizer Volcanoes. Verdugo split the 2009 season between the AZL Giants and Single-A Augusta GreenJackets, accumulating a 4-0 record and 1.27 ERA with 51 strikeouts in 35 1/3 innings pitched across 23 appearances out of the bullpen.

Verdugo split the 2010 season between Augusta and the High-A San Jose Giants. In 44 appearances (one start) for the two affiliates, he posted a combined 8-1 record and 1.87 ERA with 94 strikeouts and one save across 62 2/3 innings pitched. In 2011, Verdugo made 25 starts for the Double-A Richmond Flying Squirrels, compiling an 8-6 record and 4.35 ERA with 133 strikeouts over 130 1/3 innings of work.

=== Kansas City Royals ===
On November 7, 2011, Verdugo and Jonathan Sánchez were traded to the Kansas City Royals in exchange for Melky Cabrera. He was added to the Royals' 40-man roster on November 18 to protect him from the Rule 5 draft. Verdugo made his major-league debut on July 17, 2012, against the Seattle Mariners. He allowed six runs in 1 2/3 innings, including an RBI double to Jesus Montero and a two-run home run to Justin Smoak, and picked up the loss. The left-hander fared better after being sent down to Triple-A Omaha, posting a season record of 12–4 with a 3.75 ERA in 24 starts. Verdugo was designated for assignment by the Royals on November 20, 2012 as they cleared room on the 40-man roster ahead of the Rule 5 draft. He was subsequently outrighted to Triple-A.

=== Naranjeros de Hermosillo ===
Verdugo pitched for Naranjeros de Hermosillo of the Mexican Pacific League on the 2013–14 season.

=== Boston Red Sox ===
On July 16, 2014, Verdugo was traded to the Boston Red Sox in exchange for cash considerations. In 10 appearances (three starts) for the Triple-A Pawtucket Red Sox, he logged a 2-1 record and 3.45 ERA with 38 strikeouts and two saves across 28 2/3 innings pitched.

=== Oakland Athletics ===
On November 20, 2014, Verdugo, along with LHP Jim Fuller, signed a minor league contract with the Oakland Athletics organization. He began the 2015 season with the Triple-A Nashville Sounds, registering a 2-3 record and 3.46 ERA with 35 strikeouts in 41 2/3 innings pitched over 19 games (four starts).

=== Los Angeles Angels ===
On July 6, 2015, Verdugo was traded to the Los Angeles Angels organization, where he played for the Triple-A Salt Lake Bees; in 23 games, he compiled a 2-2 record and 5.52 ERA with 33 strikeouts. On November 6, Verdugo elected free agency.

=== Mexican League (first stint) ===
On April 28, 2016, Verdugo signed with the Rojos del Águila de Veracruz of the Mexican League. On July 3, 2016, Verdugo was traded to the Leones de Yucatán. He was released on April 23, 2017. On April 24, 2017, Verdugo signed with the Pericos de Puebla of the Mexican League. On May 9, 2017, Verdugo was traded to the Acereros de Monclova.

=== Uni-President Lions ===
On February 14, 2018, Verdugo signed with the Uni-President Lions of the Chinese Professional Baseball League. On October 7 of the same year, Verdugo completed the first (and, to date, only) perfect game in CPBL history. He re-signed with the Uni-Lions for the 2019 season, at the conclusion of which he became a free agent.

=== Mexican League (second stint) ===
On February 11, 2020, Verdugo signed with the Acereros de Monclova of the Mexican League. Verdugo did not play in a game in 2020 due to the cancellation of the Mexican League season because of the COVID-19 pandemic. Verdugo re-signed with the team for the 2021 season. In 11 appearances, he posted a 14.49 ERA and gave up 34 hits over 13 2/3 innings pitched. On July 19, 2021, Verdugo was loaned to El Águila de Veracruz (previously known as the Rojos del Águila de Veracruz) of the Mexican League for the remainder of the 2021 season. He was returned to Monclova following the conclusion of the season. On October 13, 2021, Verdugo, along with IF Jose Vargas and P Andrew Morales, were traded to the Saraperos de Saltillo of the Mexican League in exchange for OF Juan Perez. On July 28, 2022, Verdugo was traded to the Toros de Tijuana.

On February 24, 2023, Verdugo's rights were re-acquired by El Águila de Veracruz of the Mexican League. However, he did not appear for Veracruz, and retired from professional baseball on March 11, 2024.
