= Nate Adcock =

American baseball player (born 1988)

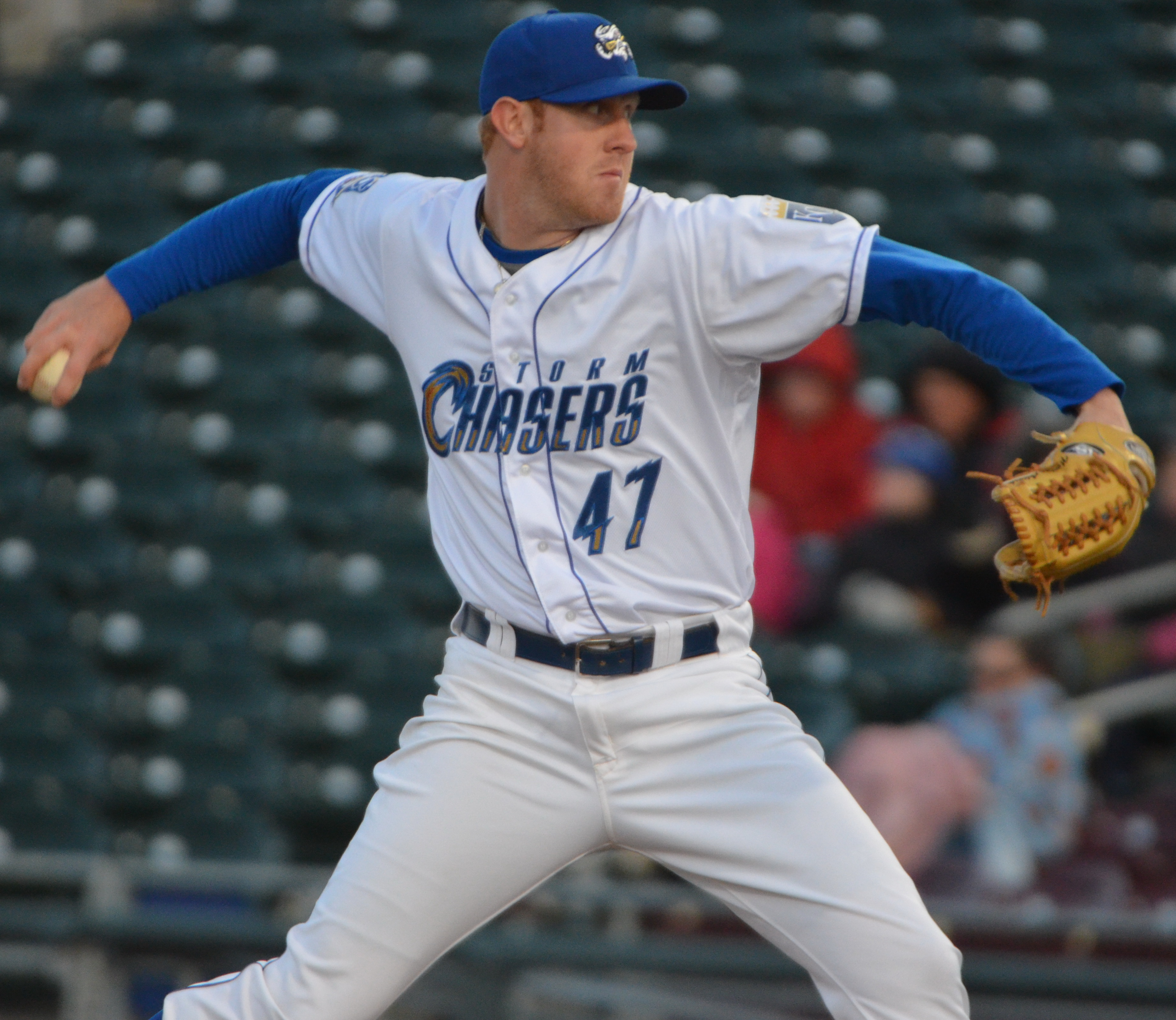
- Adcock pitching for the Omaha Storm Chasers in 2013
- Pitcher
- Born: February 25, 1988 (age 37); Elizabethtown, Kentucky, U.S.
- Batted: Right Threw: Right

MLB debut
- March 31, 2011, for the Kansas City Royals

Last MLB appearance
- July 26, 2015, for the Cincinnati Reds

MLB statistics
- Win–loss record: 2–6
- Earned run average: 4.17
- Strikeouts: 80
- Stats at Baseball Reference

Teams
- Kansas City Royals (2011–2012); Texas Rangers (2014); Cincinnati Reds (2015)

Nathan Masler Adcock (born February 25, 1988) is an American former professional baseball pitcher. He played in Major League Baseball (MLB) for the Kansas City Royals, Texas Rangers, and Cincinnati Reds.

== High school ==
Before playing professionally, Adcock attended North Hardin High School. He was drafted by the Seattle Mariners in the fifth round of the 2006 Major League Baseball draft and began his professional career that year.

== Professional career ==
=== Seattle Mariners ===
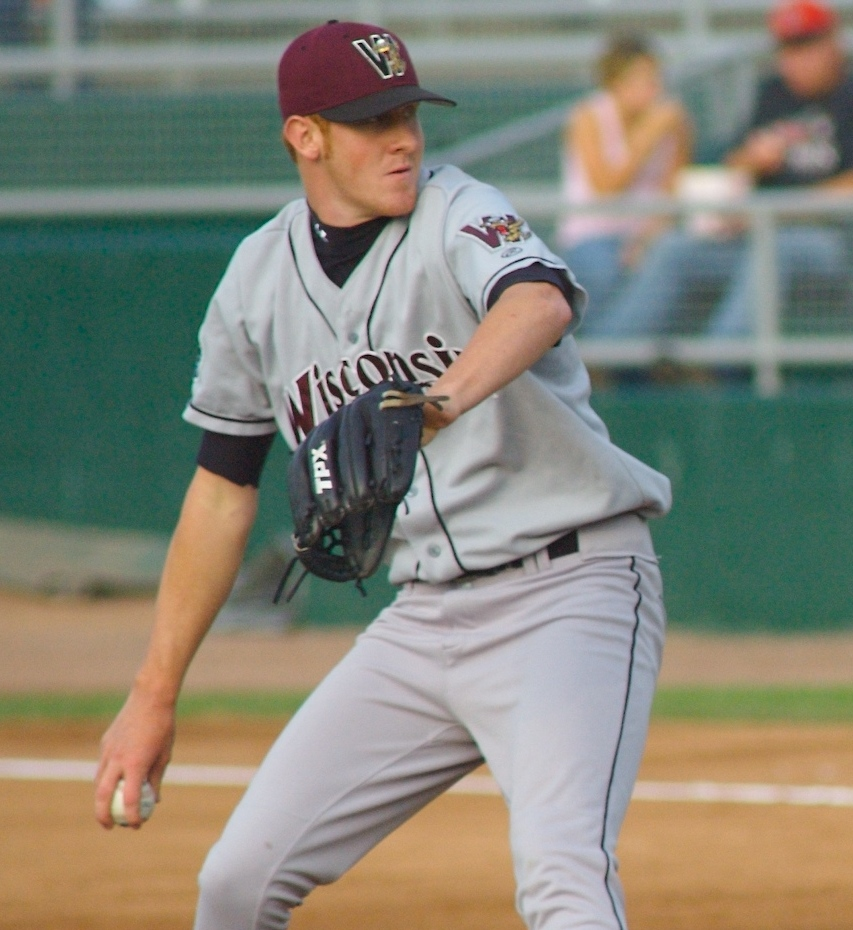
Adcock in 2007

With the AZL Mariners in 2006, Adcock went 0–2 with a 3.31 ERA in 10 games (three starts). In 2007, he went 3–11 with a 4.58 ERA in 22 games (21 starts) for the Wisconsin Timber Rattlers and High Desert Mavericks. He pitched for Wisconsin again in 2008, going 2–5 with a 3.72 ERA in 15 games (14 starts), striking out 82 batters in 77 1/3 innings. He began the 2009 season with High Desert.

=== Pittsburgh Pirates ===
On July 29, 2009, he was traded with Ronny Cedeño, Jeff Clement, Aaron Pribanic, and Brett Lorin to the Pittsburgh Pirates in exchange for Ian Snell and Jack Wilson. He finished the year with the Lynchburg Hillcats and went 8–9 with a 5.29 ERA in 28 games (23 starts) that season. In 2010, he went 11–7 with a 3.38 ERA in 27 games (26 starts) for the Bradenton Marauders. He was taken by the Kansas City Royals in the 2010 Rule 5 Draft.

=== Kansas City Royals ===
On December 9, 2010, Adcock was selected by the Kansas City Royals in the Rule 5 Draft. Adcock made his major league debut on March 31, 2011, which was Opening Day. He pitched a scoreless eighth inning against the Los Angeles Angels.

=== Arizona Diamondbacks ===
On June 13, 2013, the Arizona Diamondbacks claimed Adcock off of waivers and assigned him to the Reno Aces of the Triple–A Pacific Coast League. On July 31, he was removed from the 40–man roster and sent outright to Triple–A Reno.

=== Texas Rangers ===
On December 5, 2013, Adcock signed a minor league contract with the Texas Rangers. He had his contract selected to the major league roster on July 24. He was sent outright to Triple-A on August 14, and again on October 31, before electing free agency on the same day.

=== Cincinnati Reds ===
On December 23, 2014, Adcock signed a minor league contract with the Cincinnati Reds. On July 31, 2015, it was discovered by doctors that Adcock sustained a tear in his ulnar collateral ligament and would need Tommy John surgery, ending his season.

=== Baltimore Orioles ===
On February 29, 2016, Adcock signed a minor league contract with the Baltimore Orioles. Adcock did not appear for the Orioles organization as he continued his recovery from surgery, and elected free agency on November 6, 2017.

== Post-playing career ==
On November 7, 2018, Adcock was hired as an area scout for the Miami Marlins, ending his playing career.

== Pitching style ==
Adcock was a sinkerballer. His sinker was thrown in the low 90s and had superb movement; it averaged nearly a foot of tailslide break away from left-handers and in toward right-handers. Complementing his sinker were a four-seam fastball, slider, curveball, and changeup.
