= Bruce Chen =

Panamanian baseball player (born 1977)

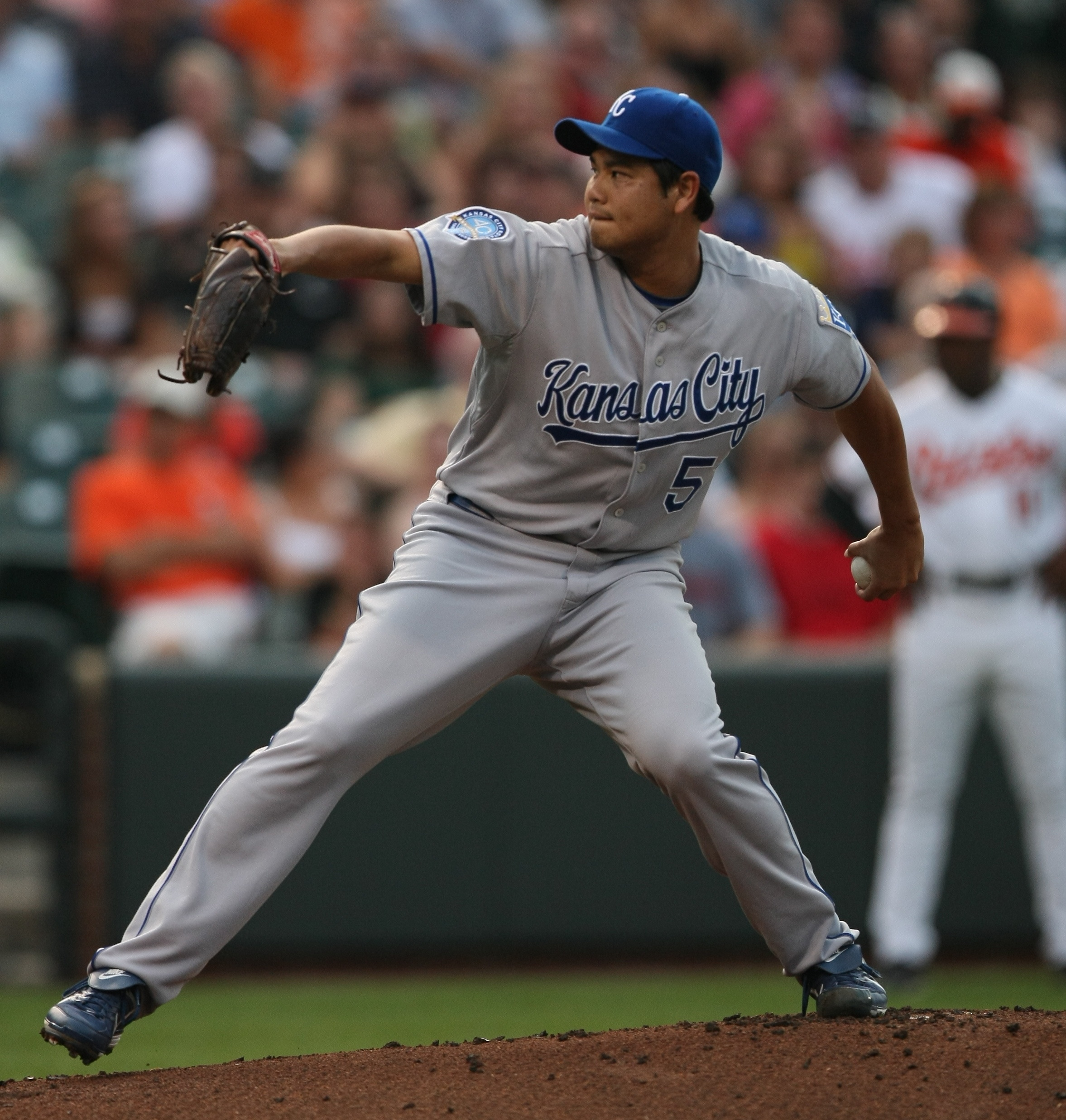
- Chen with the Kansas City Royals in 2009
- Pitcher
- Born: June 19, 1977 (age 49); Panama City, Panama
- Batted: Left Threw: Left

MLB debut
- September 7, 1998, for the Atlanta Braves

Last MLB appearance
- May 15, 2015, for the Cleveland Indians

MLB statistics
- Win–loss record: 82–81
- Earned run average: 4.62
- Strikeouts: 1,140
- Stats at Baseball Reference

Teams
- Atlanta Braves (1998–2000); Philadelphia Phillies (2000–2001); New York Mets (2001–2002); Montreal Expos (2002); Cincinnati Reds (2002); Houston Astros (2003); Boston Red Sox (2003); Baltimore Orioles (2004–2006); Texas Rangers (2007); Kansas City Royals (2009–2014); Cleveland Indians (2015)

Bruce Chen
- Traditional Chinese: 陳用彩
- Simplified Chinese: 陈用彩
Transcriptions
Standard Mandarin
- Hanyu Pinyin: Chén Yòngcǎi
- Wade–Giles: Ch'en^{2} Yung^{4}-ts'ai^{3}

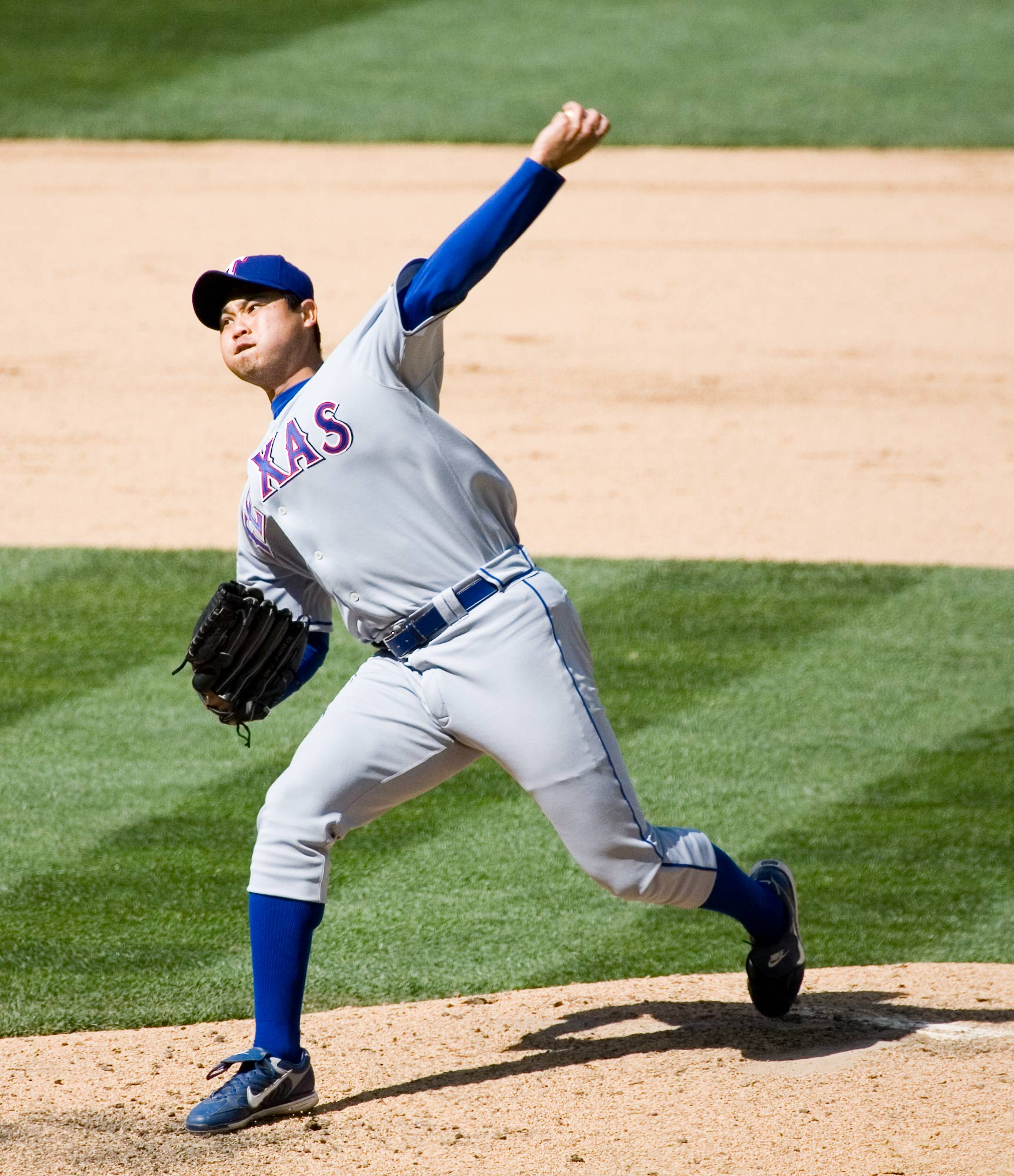
Chen pitching for the Texas Rangers in 2007

Bruce Kastulo Chen (born June 19, 1977) is a Panamanian former professional baseball pitcher who played in Major League Baseball (MLB) for the Atlanta Braves, Philadelphia Phillies, New York Mets, Montreal Expos, Cincinnati Reds, Houston Astros, Boston Red Sox, Baltimore Orioles, Texas Rangers, Kansas City Royals, and Cleveland Indians, from 1998 to 2015.

== Background ==
Chen was born in Panama to José and Luisa Chen. He is of Chinese descent. His paternal grandfather, Kuen Chin Chan Lee, joined his brothers and other relatives in Panama at age nine during the Chinese Civil War. Chen's maternal grandmother, Kuen Yin Liu de Laffo, was born in Panama, but her family had to return to China after fire destroyed their home. After years of hard labor, she returned to Panama at age 24. Both of Chen's grandparents have died. In a 2006 article in The Washington Post, Chen said that he would like to visit China to better understand his roots.

Chen has a brother, Kastulo, and a sister, Karla. Chen attended the Panamerican Institute in Panama City.

== Playing career ==
=== Early career ===
==== Braves ====
Chen signed with the Atlanta Braves as an amateur free agent on July 1, 1993. He made the South Atlantic League All-Star team in 1997 when he went 12–7 with a 3.51 ERA in 28 starts for the Macon Braves. In 1998 he made 23 starts for the Greenville Braves and was 13–7 with a 3.29 ERA. He was selected by the Southern League as an All-Star and the Most Outstanding Pitcher. He was also a Double-A All-Star, Baseball America minor league All-Star and the Braves minor league pitcher of the year.

He made his MLB debut with the Braves on September 7, 1998, against the New York Mets. He started the game but only lasted three innings while allowing 4 runs on 6 hits. He picked up his first win, when he went seven innings on September 12 against the Florida Marlins. He remained with the Braves through mid-2000, pitching in 42 games (starting 11) and was 8–2 with a 4.28 ERA.

==== Phillies ====
He was traded by the Braves to the Philadelphia Phillies on July 12, 2000 (with Jimmy Osting) for Andy Ashby. He was a full-time starter with the Phillies, starting 31 games with a 7–9 record and 4.28 ERA. While playing for the Phillies, Chen had a loyal group of fans known as "The Chen Pen".

=== Middle career ===
The Phillies traded him to the New York Mets on July 27, 2001, for Dennis Cook and Turk Wendell. He made 11 starts (and 1 relief appearance) for the Mets and was 3–2 with a 4.61 ERA, and started the first game played by the Mets after the September 11 attacks versus the Braves at Shea Stadium on September 21. Chen was traded again on April 5, 2002, to the Montreal Expos (with Luis Figueroa, Saul Rivera and Dicky Gonzalez) for Phil Seibel, Scott Strickland and Matt Watson. He made 15 appearances (4 starts) for the Expos and was 2–3 with a 6.99 ERA.

He was traded for the fourth time, on June 14, 2002, to the Cincinnati Reds for Jim Brower. He only made 1 start for the Reds and appeared in relief 39 times, with a 4.31 ERA. Released by the Reds, he was signed as a free agent by the Houston Astros on March 14, 2003. He appeared in only 11 games and had an ERA of 6.00 with the Astros. The Boston Red Sox selected him off waivers from the Astros on May 7, 2003. He appeared in 5 games for the Red Sox, with 2 starts and had a 5.11 ERA.

He signed as a free agent with the Toronto Blue Jays on November 26, 2003. He made 3 starts in AAA with the Syracuse SkyChiefs. He was sent to the Baltimore Orioles on May 1, 2004. He added a changeup to his repertoire of pitches, which includes an 87–90 mph fastball, and a slow 12–6 curveball.

Chen played for the Panamanian team at the 2006 World Baseball Classic. He threw five innings, giving up four hits, two runs (both earned), and a walk, with three strikeouts, against a powerful Cuba team in the opening round of the tournament at San Juan, Puerto Rico.

During the 2006 regular season, he went 0–7 with a 6.93 earned run average (ERA), starting 12 games, but appearing in 28 others coming out of the bullpen. The Orioles declined to re–sign Chen, and he filed for free agency on November 1, 2006.

Chen signed a minor league contract with the Texas Rangers on February 6, 2007, with an invitation to spring training. Chen made the Rangers' opening day roster, taking a spot in the bullpen. He was reported to have reworked his contract to accept an outright assignment to Triple-A Oklahoma if room was needed on the roster.

=== Later career ===
==== Royals ====
Chen pitched for Panama again at the 2009 World Baseball Classic. On March 1, 2009, Chen signed a minor league contract with the Kansas City Royals. He made his debut with the Royals on June 27, 2009. He allowed 4 runs in 7 1/3 innings. Chen's second start was much better, as he only gave up two runs on five hits with one walk and five strikeouts. On August 6, 2009, Chen won his first major league game since October 2, 2005.

Chen re-signed a minor league contract with the Royals on December 11, 2009. On April 26, 2010, he earned his first MLB save, in a 3–1 Royals victory over the Seattle Mariners. He threw seven perfect innings before allowing a hit on July 3, 2010, against the Los Angeles Angels. On October 1, 2010, in his last start of the season, Chen threw a two-hit shutout against the Tampa Bay Rays, striking out seven and only walking two. It was the first shutout he threw in his Major League career. He finished the season with a 12–7 record, and an ERA of 4.17.

Bruce had a productive 2011 season, posting a 12–8 record with a 3.77 ERA. On November 23, 2011, Chen agreed to a two-year deal to return to the Royals. In 2012, Chen finished with an 11–14 record and posted an ERA of 5.07. Despite the regression, Chen threw 191.2 innings (2nd highest career total) and had a career high 140 strikeouts. Even though Panama did not qualify for the 2013 World Baseball Classic, Chen was contacted by Team China about the possibility of playing for them in the Classic.

He returned to the Royals for the 2014 season, agreeing to a one-year contract. On July 22, he tied Mariano Rivera for most wins earned by a Panamanian-born player with 82. He was designated for assignment on August 29, 2014, and released on September 5.

==== Indians ====
On February 16, 2015, he agreed to a minor league contract with the Cleveland Indians. The Indians purchased his contract and added him to the active roster on May 9. After earning a 12.79 ERA in 6 1/3 innings, Chen was designated for assignment on May 16. He announced his retirement from baseball two days later.

Chen came out of retirement to pitch for Team China in the 2017 World Baseball Classic.

== Post-playing career ==
Following his retirement, Chen worked as a Cultural Development Adviser for the Cleveland Indians organization. As of November 25, 2017, he was no longer with the Indians, and had moved to the Los Angeles Dodgers organization to serve as their Latin America Field Coordinator.

== Personal ==
Chen and his wife Mary have three daughters. Chen is the only alumnus of the Panamerican Institute to make the major leagues. He has studied civil engineering during the baseball off-season at Georgia Tech.

In 2026, porn star Silvia Saige revealed that, when Chen played for the Royals, she dated Chen for several months, not knowing Chen was already engaged to another woman. Once Saige learned Chen already had a fiancé, she ended the relationship.
