= 2013 Kansas City Royals season =

2013 Kansas City Royals
- League: American League
- Division: Central
- Ballpark: Kauffman Stadium
- City: Kansas City, Missouri
- Record: 86–76 (.531)
- Divisional place: 3rd
- Owners: David Glass
- General managers: Dayton Moore
- Managers: Ned Yost
- Television: Fox Sports Kansas City (Ryan Lefebvre, Jeff Montgomery, Rex Hudler, Steve Physioc)
- Radio: KCSP 610 AM (Denny Matthews, Steve Stewart, Ryan Lefebvre, Steve Physioc)

The Kansas City Royals' 2013 season was the 45th for the Royals franchise which began on April 1, 2013, against the Chicago White Sox and ended on September 29 against the White Sox.

After a winning record in spring training (setting a team and MLB record), the Royals remained over .500 through mid-May. The team also didn't commit an error in their first seven games, a streak spanning 64 2/3 innings, for the first time in team history. On September 22, the Royals won their 82nd game of the season, clinching their second winning season since 1994 and first since 2003.

== Offseason and spring training ==
During the offseason, the Kansas City Royals donated over $4 million in funds raised during the 2012 All-Star game for various projects in the Kansas City area communities, including building two baseball facilities for disabled children.

Alex Gordon signed a $37.5 million four-year deal last season with the Royals. Eric Hosmer missed spring training with the team to play for the United States national team in the World Baseball Classic.

Pitcher Zack Greinke, who won the 2009 AL Cy Young Award while with Kansas City before being traded to Milwaukee, signed a $147 million six-year contract with the Los Angeles Dodgers in the offseason.

Jeremy Guthrie signed a three-year, $25 million contract in November 2012 to stay with the Royals after being their best starter during the year. Guthrie will be the Royals' No. 3 starter. Former AL MVP, Miguel Tejada, made the team as a utility player with a $1.1 million one-year contract.

During spring training in Surprise, Arizona, the Royals had the best record of any team and maintained first place throughout every game. They not only tied and then exceeded a franchise record (previously set 22 wins and 9 losses in 1999), but also had more spring training wins than any other team in MLB history.

The Royals were the only team losing less than 10 games other than the Baltimore Orioles (9 losses), ending spring training with a 25–7–2 record. Kansas City lost their first spring training game after 11 wins in a row, the only unbeaten team in spring training at that point.

Kansas City manager Ned Yost said "The key to our success this year is going to be our pitching staff, because we can catch the ball. If they're throwing strikes, we're going to be able to make plays and I think we're going to be able to score runs." Yost added, "It just gives you confidence going into the season knowing that everybody's ready, everybody's playing well."

The Royals left Arizona (Surprise Stadium) without any players having any serious injuries. This was in contrast to March 2012 when closer Joakim Soria needed season-ending Tommy John surgery and starting catcher Salvador Pérez required knee surgery which sidelined him until late June 2012.

Kansas City led the majors in team batting average, hits, doubles, runs scored and on-base percentage, clinching first place in the Cactus League standings. The Royals finished with a Cactus League-leading .335 batting average and 230 runs.

After improving their starting rotation, the Royals were considered a "sleeper team" entering the 2013 season. The Royals appeared poised to challenge the AL champion Detroit Tigers in the AL Central. Overall, the Royals increased their chances that they would contend in 2013.

According to Fox Sports, for the first time in more than two decades the Kansas City Royals may become relevant again. Other projections predicted the Royals to finish in second, third or even fourth place in the American League Central.

"There's a lot to like about this team", Royals manager Ned Yost said. "I think we've got a great defense. I think our starting pitching is going to be a focal point and a strong asset to our club. Our relief pitching has always been dynamite in my mind."

== Transactions ==
=== Signings ===
•Major League: Jeremy Guthrie, SP: three years, $25MM.

•Minor League: Blaine Boyer, Chad Tracy, Endy Chávez, Miguel Tejada, Xavier Nady, Willy Taveras, George Sherrill, Dan Wheeler, Brandon Wood and Anthony Ortega.

=== Trades and claims ===
•Acquired SP James Shields, P Wade Davis and IF Elliot Johnson from the Tampa Bay Rays for OF Wil Myers, P Mike Montgomery, 3B Patrick Leonard and P Jake Odorizzi.

•Acquired P Luis Rico and P Luis Santos from the Pittsburgh Pirates for P Vin Mazzaro and 1B Clint Robinson.

•Acquired SP Ervin Santana from the Los Angeles Angels for P Brandon Sisk.

•Claimed C George Kottaras off waivers from the Oakland Athletics.

•Claimed P Guillermo Moscoso off waivers from the Colorado Rockies.

•Claimed C Brett Hayes off waivers from the Miami Marlins.

•Claimed P Chris Volstad off waivers from the Chicago Cubs.

=== Notable losses ===
•Wil Myers, Vin Mazzaro, Joakim Soria, Mike Montgomery, Brandon Sisk and Patrick Leonard.

== Season highlights ==
=== April ===
In April, Jeremy Guthrie had the longest undefeated streak by a Royals pitcher over 13 starts since Kevin Appier in 1994–95.

On April 5, Alex Gordon and Chris Getz each hit a bases-loaded triple, allowing the Royals to rally and beat the Philadelphia Phillies 13–4, spoiling the Phillies' home opener with a sellout crowd of 45,307 at Citizens Bank Park. The interleague matchup was a rare one between teams who first met in the 1980 World Series. The only other visit to Philadelphia by the Royals came in 2004. After getting a total of 17 hits in their first three games against the Chicago White Sox, the Royals had 19 against the Phillies. Hall of Famers Mike Schmidt and George Brett, rivals when the Phillies beat the Royals to win their first championship 33 years earlier, threw out the first pitches (along with SNL's Joe Piscopo). Wade Davis, acquired from Tampa Bay Rays along with James Shields, made his first start since 2011. He made 54 relief appearances for the Rays in 2012 after 58 starts from 2010 to 2011.

The Royals didn't commit an error in their first seven games (64 2/3 innings) for the first time in team history. By April 10, the Royals had won four straight games and six of seven games to move three games above .500 for the first time since May 12, 2011, when they were 20–17. The Royals went on to sweep the Minnesota Twins at home at Kauffman Stadium. However, on April 12 (after a day off), the Royals lost against the Toronto Blue Jays after committing three errors within the game, matching their season total at that time.

Royals 1B Eric Hosmer had tightness in his right quadriceps and did not start for the second straight night on April 13. Nonetheless, as a result of Alex Gordon driving in a run, the Royals avoided a three-game sweep by the Blue Jays, who had won six straight and eight of 10 against the Royals at Kauffman Stadium, including a four-game sweep in their only series in Kansas City from the previous season. Therefore, the Royals maintained first place in the Central division, but were tied with the Detroit Tigers after they defeated the Oakland Athletics.

==== Impact of the Boston Marathon bombing ====
Although performing well, the Royals helped the Atlanta Braves win their 10th straight game with a 6–3 victory over KC on April 16. After both teams had a day off, players, managers and coaches for both teams wore No. 42 on their jerseys to honor Jackie Robinson. Like many teams, the Braves also held a moment of silence before the game for the victims of the Boston Marathon bombing (April 15). Chris Getz, KC's number 8 hitter, homered for the first time in nearly four years. Jeff Francoeur, a former Braves RF, played his first game at Turner Field with Kansas City. With Wade Davis pitching 7 scoreless innings, the Royals beat the Braves 1–0 on April 17 to end Atlanta's 10-game winning streak.

The Royals had a scheduled weekend series against the Boston Red Sox on April 19–21. It was to be Boston's first home game since the bombings, the explosions occurring 45 minutes after they finished playing the Rays on April 15 while en route to play the Cleveland Indians. However, the Greater Boston area went on a citywide lockdown in search of a suspect on the morning of April 19. Therefore, their first "homecoming game" of the weekend was postponed. The Red Sox reported the decision was made "to support efforts of law enforcement officers." The Royals stayed at the Westin Copley Place Hotel near Copley Square, about a block from the marathon finish line. "We've been told not to go outside. We've been told the hotel has been locked down, although I've seen a handful of people moving around," Royals vice president Mike Swanson said. "The streets are just, wow. It's numbingly quiet for a noon hour in Boston." No make-up game was immediately scheduled.

However, with the second suspect captured that same evening and Fenway Park under tight security, play resumed Saturday, April 20, with a win of 4–3 by Boston over the Royals. Following an emotional pregame ceremony, both teams honored the victims of the bombing tragedy by wearing special uniforms/logos. (The Red Sox wore white home jerseys with "Boston" on the front instead of the customary "Red Sox" while Kansas City players and staff wore a "B Strong" patch on the front of their jerseys, with the shirts being auctioned off for funds to support victims of the bombing.) The Red Sox later announced Friday's (April, 19) game would be made up as part of a day-night doubleheader on Sunday (April, 21). The regularly scheduled game took place at 1:35 p.m. and a nightcap at 7 p.m. Even with the loss, the Royals moved to first place since the Detroit Tigers also lost in the American League Central.

On April 21, Kansas City ended Boston's seven-game winning streak with a 4–2 win over the Red Sox in the opener of a day-night doubleheader. With tributes to the victims of the Boston Marathon bombings still visibly clear, the Royals ended a season-opening streak of 16 games by Red Sox starters allowing three runs or less, tying an AL record achieved by the Oakland Athletics in 1978 and 1981. With the Detroit Tigers losing, the win kept the Royals secure in first place. In the second game of the doubleheader, Kansas City narrowly beat Boston 5–4 in 10 innings to win the weekend series (and sweep the doubleheader), as a result of Lorenzo Cain walking with two outs and the bases loaded in the 10th inning. With both wins against the Red Sox on April 21, Kansas City remained in first place in the AL Central as did Boston in the AL East. A disappointing ending to an emotional weekend for the Red Sox, Ervin Santana (2–1) pitched seven strong innings, Kelvin Herrera (2–2) got the win, and Greg Holland pitched a perfect ninth for his fourth save in five opportunities. Billy Butler homered in the eighth inning of the night game (clearing the Green Monster). The Royals also recalled LHP Will Smith from Triple-A Omaha.

==== Remaining in first place ====
On April 25, Alex Gordon's grand slam (clearing the 420-foot marker on the wall in center field) highlighted a five-run 10th inning for Kansas City, who rallied against the Detroit Tigers bullpen for an 8–3 win, keeping the Royals in first place (ALC). Billy Butler had three hits on the day and improved to 23 for 55 (.418) off Justin Verlander, the best mark of anyone with at least 30 at-bats against the Detroit pitcher. Tim Collins (1–0) pitched a scoreless ninth for the Royals and got the win. This followed a game the previous day, which the Royals narrowly lost against Detroit (having only played two out of six days due to postponed games and having no batting practice prior to the game on April 24 as a result of bad weather). Overall, the Royals went 4–3 at Atlanta, Boston and Detroit. Kansas City did not play a home game since April 14. They played seven road games in 11 days. "This was a phenomenal road trip for us", said right-hander James Shields, who pitched eight solid innings on April 25. "We're going to look back at this road trip, and I think it's going to be a pretty crucial road trip."

On April 28, in the opener of a doubleheader caused by a rainout two days earlier, Jeremy Guthrie (3–0) allowed six hits over 6 2/3 innings for his 16th consecutive start without a loss. That matched the Kansas City record set by Paul Splittorff from August 13, 1977 – April 22, 1978. The Royals went on to beat the Indians 9–0, with a memorable 500th career hit from Alcides Escobar being a home run (370 feet) and a right center home run by Alex Gordon (438 feet),

=== May ===
After spending most of April in first place (AL Central), the Royals ended the month with a 14–10 record (7–4 at home), a half game behind the Detroit Tigers as of April 30 (an improvement from their 6–15 mark going into May a year ago). However, on May 1, the Royals moved back into first place (15–10), due to the Tigers losing to the Minnesota Twins and then the Royals later beating the Tampa Bay Rays (giving them a .600 percentage). Unfortunately, it was not to last, as the Royals would go 8-20 for the month, their worst May record since 2006 (8-21).

== Season standings ==
=== American League Central ===
AL Central
Team	W	L	Pct.	GB	Home	Road
Detroit Tigers	93	69	.574	—	51‍–‍30	42‍–‍39
Cleveland Indians	92	70	.568	1	51‍–‍30	41‍–‍40
Kansas City Royals	86	76	.531	7	44‍–‍37	42‍–‍39
Minnesota Twins	66	96	.407	27	32‍–‍49	34‍–‍47
Chicago White Sox	63	99	.389	30	37‍–‍44	26‍–‍55

=== American League Wild Card ===
Division winners
Team	W	L	Pct.
Boston Red Sox	97	65	.599
Oakland Athletics	96	66	.593
Detroit Tigers	93	69	.574

Wild Card teams (Top 2 teams qualify for postseason)
Team	W	L	Pct.	GB
Cleveland Indians	92	70	.568	+½
Tampa Bay Rays	92	71	.564	—
Texas Rangers	91	72	.558	1
Kansas City Royals	86	76	.531	5½
New York Yankees	85	77	.525	6½
Baltimore Orioles	85	77	.525	6½
Los Angeles Angels	78	84	.481	13½
Toronto Blue Jays	74	88	.457	17½
Seattle Mariners	71	91	.438	20½
Minnesota Twins	66	96	.407	25½
Chicago White Sox	63	99	.389	28½
Houston Astros	51	111	.315	40½

=== Record vs. opponents ===
2013 American League record Source: MLB Standings Grid – 2013
Team	BAL	BOS	CWS	CLE	DET	HOU	KC	LAA	MIN	NYY	OAK	SEA	TB	TEX	TOR	NL
Baltimore	—	11–8	4–3	3–4	4–2	4–2	3–4	5–2	3–3	9–10	5–2	2–4	6–13	5–2	10–9	11–9
Boston	8–11	—	4–2	6–1	3–4	6–1	2–5	3–3	4–3	13–6	3–3	6–1	12–7	2–4	11–8	14–6
Chicago	3–4	2–4	—	2–17	7–12	3–4	9–10	3–4	8–11	3–3	2–5	3–3	2–5	4–2	4–3	8–12
Cleveland	4–3	1–6	17–2	—	4–15	6–1	10–9	4–2	13–6	1–6	5–2	5–2	2–4	5–1	4–2	11–9
Detroit	2–4	4–3	12–7	15–4	—	6–1	9–10	0–6	11–8	3–3	3–4	5–2	3–3	3–4	5–2	12–8
Houston	2–4	1–6	4–3	1–6	1–6	—	2–4	10–9	1–5	1–5	4–15	9–10	2–5	2–17	3–4	8–12
Kansas City	4–3	5–2	10–9	9–10	10–9	4–2	—	2–5	15–4	2–5	1–5	4–3	6–1	3–3	2–4	9–11
Los Angeles	2–5	3–3	4–3	2–4	6–0	9–10	5–2	—	1–5	3–4	8–11	11–8	4–3	4–15	6–1	10–10
Minnesota	3–3	3–4	11–8	6–13	8–11	5–1	4–15	5–1	—	2–5	1–6	4–3	1–6	4–3	1–5	8–12
New York	10–9	6–13	3–3	6–1	3–3	5–1	5–2	4–3	5–2	—	1–5	4–3	7–12	3–4	14–5	9–11
Oakland	2–5	3–3	5–2	2–5	4–3	15–4	5–1	11–8	6–1	5–1	—	8–11	3–3	10–9	4–3	13–7
Seattle	4–2	1–6	3–3	2–5	2–5	10–9	3–4	8–11	3–4	3–4	11–8	—	3–3	7–12	3–3	8–12
Tampa Bay	13–6	7–12	5–2	4–2	3–3	5–2	1–6	3–4	6–1	12–7	3–3	3–3	—	4–4	11–8	12–8
Texas	2–5	4–2	2–4	1–5	4–3	17–2	3–3	15–4	3–4	4–3	9–10	12–7	4–4	—	1–6	10–10
Toronto	9–10	8–11	3–4	2–4	2–5	4–3	4–2	1–6	5–1	5–14	3–4	3–3	8–11	6–1	—	11–9

=== Detailed records ===
American League
Opponent	Home	Away	Total	Pct.
AL East
Baltimore Orioles	3–1	1–2	4–3	.571
Boston Red Sox	3–1	2–1	5–2	.714
New York Yankees	0–3	2–2	2–5	.286
Tampa Bay Rays	3–0	3–1	6–1	.857
Toronto Blue Jays	1–2	–	1–2	.333
	10–7	8–6	18–13	.581
AL Central
Chicago White Sox	3–6	7–3	10–9	.526
Cleveland Indians	6–4	3–6	9–10	.474
Detroit Tigers	6–3	4–6	10–9	.526
Minnesota Twins	7–2	8–2	15–4	.789
	22–15	22–17	44–32	.579
AL West
Houston Astros	3–0	1–2	4–2	.667
Los Angeles Angels	0–4	2–1	2–5	.286
Oakland Athletics	1–2	0–3	1–5	.167
Seattle Mariners	–	–	–	–
Texas Rangers	–	1–2	1–2	.333
	4–6	4–8	8–14	.364

National League
Opponent	Home	Away	Total	Pct.
Atlanta Braves	1–1	1–1	2–2	.500
Miami Marlins	1–2	–	1–2	.333
New York Mets	–	2–1	2–1	.667
Philadelphia Phillies	–	2–1	2–1	.667
St. Louis Cardinals	0–2	1–1	1–3	.250
Washington Nationals	1–2	–	1–2	.333
	3–7	6–4	9–11	.450

== Game log ==
Legend
Royals Win	Royals Loss	Game postponed
* All times are CDT

2013 Game Log
April (14–10)

#	Date	Opponent	Time	Score	Win	Loss	Save	Attendance	Record
1	April 1	@ White Sox	3:10	0–1	Chris Sale (1–0)	James Shields (0–1)	Addison Reed (1)	39,012	0–1
2	April 3	@ White Sox	3:10	2–5	Jake Peavy (1–0)	Ervin Santana (0–1)	Addison Reed (2)	14,213	0–2
3	April 4	@ White Sox	3:10	3–1	Jeremy Guthrie (1–0)	Gavin Floyd (0–1)	Greg Holland (1)	15,036	1–2
4	April 5	@ Phillies	3:05	13–4	Bruce Chen (1–0)	Kyle Kendrick(0–1)		45,307	2–2
5	April 6	@ Phillies	6:05	3–4	Antonio Bastardo (1–0)	Greg Holland (0–1)		39,475	2–3
6	April 7	@ Phillies	12:35	9–8	James Shields (1–1)	Cole Hamels (0–2)	Kelvin Herrera (1)	39,451	3–3
7	April 8	Twins	3:10	3–1	Ervin Santana (1–1)	Kevin Correia (0–1)	Aaron Crow (1)	40,073	4–3
8	April 9	Twins	7:10	7–4	Jeremy Guthrie (2–0)	Mike Pelfrey (1–1)	Greg Holland (2)	11,697	5–3
9	April 10	Twins	7:10	3–0	Wade Davis (1–0)	Liam Hendriks (0–1)	Kelvin Herrera (2)	10,069	6–3
10	April 12	Blue Jays	7:10	4–8	J. A. Happ (2–0)	Luis Mendoza (0–1)	Aaron Loup (1)	13,049	6–4
11	April 13	Blue Jays	6:10	2–3	R. A. Dickey (1–2)	James Shields (1–2)	Casey Janssen (3)	21,960	6–5
12	April 14	Blue Jays	1:10	3–2	Kelvin Herrera (1–0)	Darren Oliver (0–1)		29,057	7–5
13	April 16	@ Braves	6:10	3–6	Eric O'Flaherty (3–0)	Kelvin Herrera (1–1)		26,400	7–6
14	April 17	@ Braves	11:10	1–0	Wade Davis (2–0)	Mike Minor (2–1)	Greg Holland (3)	23,018	8–6
–	April 19	@ Red Sox	Postponed (lockdown in Boston due to manhunt for Boston Marathon bombing suspect) (Makeup date: doubleheader April 21)						
15	April 20	@ Red Sox	12:10	3–4	Clay Buchholz (4–0)	Kelvin Herrera (1–2)	Andrew Bailey (3)	35,152	8–7
16	April 21	@ Red Sox	1:35	4–2	Ervin Santana (2–1)	Ryan Dempster (0–2)	Greg Holland (4)	31,483	9–7
17	April 21	@ Red Sox	7:05	5–4	Kelvin Herrera (2–2)	Andrew Miller (0–1)	Greg Holland (5)	33,270	10–7
–	April 23	@ Tigers	Postponed (rain) (Makeup date: doubleheader August 16)						
18	April 24	@ Tigers	6:05	5–7	Max Scherzer (2–0)	Wade Davis (2–1)	José Valverde (1)	30,347	10–8
19	April 25	@ Tigers	12:05	8–3 (10)	Tim Collins (1–0)	Phil Coke (0–3)		30,321	11–8
–	April 26	Indians	Postponed (rain) (Makeup date: doubleheader April 28)						
20	April 27	Indians	6:10	3–2	Ervin Santana (3–1)	Scott Kazmir (0–1)	Greg Holland (6)	19,224	12–8
21	April 28	Indians	1:10	9–0	Jeremy Guthrie (3–0)	Justin Masterson (4–2)		22,001	13–8
22	April 28	Indians	7:10	3–10	Corey Kluber (2–0)	Will Smith (0–1)		19,831	13–9
23	April 29	Indians	7:10	0–9	Ubaldo Jiménez (1–2)	Wade Davis (2–2)		14,255	13–10
24	April 30	Rays	7:10	8–2	James Shields (2–2)	Alex Cobb (3–2)		12,738	14–10

May (8–20)

#	Date	Opponent	Time	Score	Win	Loss	Save	Attendance	Record
25	May 1	Rays	7:10	9–8	Bruce Chen (2–0)	Jake McGee (0–2)	Greg Holland (7)	11,514	15–10
–	May 2	Rays	Postponed after 3 1/2 innings (rain) (Makeup date: August 26)						
–	May 3	White Sox	Postponed (rain) (Makeup date: May 6)						
26	May 4	White Sox	6:10	2–0	Jeremy Guthrie (4–0)	Dylan Axelrod (0–2)		19,957	16–10
27	May 5	White Sox	1:10	6–5 (10)	Greg Holland (1–1)	Brian Omogrosso (0–1)		16,462	17–10
28	May 6	White Sox	1:10	1–2 (11)	Jesse Crain (1–1)	Kelvin Herrera (2–3)	Addison Reed (11)	15,576	17–11
29	May 7	@ Orioles	6:05	3–4	Tommy Hunter (2–1)	Tim Collins (1–1)	Jim Johnson (12)	12,921	17–12
30	May 8	@ Orioles	6:05	3–5	Chris Tillman (3–1)	Luis Mendoza (0–2)	Jim Johnson (13)	12,344	17–13
31	May 9	@ Orioles	6:05	6–2	Jeremy Guthrie (5–0)	Freddy García (0–1)		23,282	18–13
32	May 10	Yankees	7:10	6–11	Phil Hughes (2–2)	Wade Davis (2–3)		24,521	18–14
33	May 11	Yankees	6:10	2–3	Andy Pettitte (4–2)	James Shields (2–3)	Mariano Rivera (14)	30,910	18–15
34	May 12	Yankees	1:10	2–4	Hiroki Kuroda (5–2)	Ervin Santana (3–2)	Mariano Rivera (15)	29,515	18–16
35	May 13	@ Angels	9:05	11–4	Luis Mendoza (1–2)	Joe Blanton (0–7)	Luke Hochevar (1)	32,203	19–16
36	May 14	@ Angels	9:05	2–6	Jason Vargas (2–3)	Jeremy Guthrie (5–1)		33,028	19–17
37	May 15	@ Angels	9:05	9–5	Wade Davis (3–3)	Barry Enright (0–2)		31,917	20–17
38	May 17	@ Athletics	9:07	1–2	Sean Doolittle (3–0)	James Shields (2–4)	Grant Balfour (7)	14,602	20–18
39	May 18	@ Athletics	8:07	1–2	Tommy Milone (4–5)	Ervin Santana (3–3)	Grant Balfour (8)	35,067	20–19
40	May 19	@ Athletics	3:07	3–4	Jerry Blevins (3–0)	Kelvin Herrera (2–4)	Ryan Cook (1)	20,387	20–20
41	May 20	@ Astros	7:10	5–6	Dallas Keuchel (1–1)	Jeremy Guthrie (5–2)	José Veras (7)	12,989	20–21
42	May 21	@ Astros	7:10	7–3	Bruce Chen (3–0)	Paul Clemens (1–2)		12,302	21–21
43	May 22	@ Astros	7:10	1–3	Jordan Lyles (2–1)	James Shields (2–5)	José Veras (8)	12,324	21–22
44	May 23	Angels	7:10	4–5	Joe Blanton (1–7)	Ervin Santana (3–4)	Robert Coello (1)	18,784	21–23
45	May 24	Angels	7:10	2–5	Jason Vargas (4–3)	Luke Hochevar (0–1)	Garrett Richards (1)	32,148	21–24
46	May 25	Angels	1:10	0–7	Billy Buckner (1–0)	Jeremy Guthrie (5–3)		27,958	21–25
47	May 26	Angels	1:10	2–5	Jerome Williams (4–1)	Wade Davis (3–4)	Ernesto Frieri (10)	24,475	21–26
48	May 27	Cardinals	1:10	3–6	Adam Wainwright (7–3)	James Shields (2–6)	Edward Mujica (15)	34,746	21–27
49	May 28	Cardinals	7:10	1–4	Tyler Lyons (2–0)	Ervin Santana (3–5)	Edward Mujica (16)	27,833	21–28
50	May 29	@ Cardinals	7:15	3–5	Randy Choate (1–0)	Aaron Crow (0–1)	Edward Mujica (17)	43,477	21–29
51	May 30	@ Cardinals	7:15	4–2	Louis Coleman (1–0)	Mitchell Boggs (0–3)	Greg Holland (8)	43,916	22–29
52	May 31	@ Rangers	7:05	2–7	Derek Holland (5–2)	Wade Davis (3–5)		37,765	22–30

June (16–11)

#	Date	Opponent	Time	Score	Win	Loss	Save	Attendance	Record
53	June 1	@ Rangers	3:05	4–1 (10)	Aaron Crow (1–1)	Robbie Ross (2–1)	Greg Holland (9)	36,107	23–30
54	June 2	@ Rangers	2:05	1–3	Tanner Scheppers (4–0)	JC Gutierrez (0–1)	Joe Nathan (17)	47,567	23–31
55	June 4	Twins	7:10	0–3	Samuel Deduno (2–1)	Luis Mendoza (1–3)	Glen Perkins (12)	20,134	23–32
56	June 5	Twins	7:10	4–1	Jeremy Guthrie (6–3)	P. J. Walters (2–1)	Greg Holland (10)	12,407	24–32
57	June 6	Twins	7:10	7–3	Tim Collins (2–1)	Jared Burton (0–3)		14,942	25–32
58	June 7	Astros	7:10	4–2	Kelvin Herrera (3–4)	Wesley Wright (0–2)	Greg Holland (11)	24,808	26–32
59	June 8	Astros	6:15	7–2	Ervin Santana (4–5)	Érik Bédard (1–3)		28,055	27–32
60	June 9	Astros	1:10	2–0	Aaron Crow (2–1)	Héctor Ambriz (1–3)	Greg Holland (12)	20,723	28–32
61	June 10	Tigers	7:10	3–2	Jeremy Guthrie (7–3)	Doug Fister (5–4)	Greg Holland (13)	17,653	29–32
62	June 11	Tigers	7:10	2–3	Max Scherzer (9–0)	Aaron Crow (2–2)	José Valverde (9)	16,493	29–33
63	June 12	Tigers	1:10	3–2 (10)	Greg Holland (2–1)	Phil Coke (0–4)		24,564	30–33
64	June 13	@ Rays	6:10	10–1	Ervin Santana (5–5)	Jeremy Hellickson (4–3)		11,398	31–33
65	June 14	@ Rays	6:10	7–2	Luis Mendoza (2–3)	Matt Moore (8–3)		13,407	32–33
66	June 15	@ Rays	3:10	3–5	Alex Torres (2–0)	Jeremy Guthrie(7–4)	Fernando Rodney (14)	18,593	32–34
67	June 16	@ Rays	12:40	5–3	Wade Davis (4–5)	Roberto Hernández (4–7)	Greg Holland (14)	27,442	33–34
68	June 17	@ Indians	6:10	2–1	Aaron Crow (3–2)	Bryan Shaw (0–1)	Greg Holland (15)	12,803	34–34
69	June 18	@ Indians	6:10	3–4	Cody Allen (2–0)	Kelvin Herrera (3–5)	Vinnie Pestano (2)	14,853	34–35
70	June 19	@ Indians	6:10	3–6	Justin Masterson (9–5)	Luis Mendoza (2–4)		17,349	34–36
71	June 21	White Sox	7:10	1–9	Hector Santiago (3–5)	Jeremy Guthrie (7–5)		33,830	34–37
72	June 22	White Sox	1:10	2–3	Jesse Crain (2–1)	Aaron Crow (3–3)	Addison Reed (21)	20,364	34–38
73	June 23	White Sox	1:10	7–6	Luke Hochevar (1–1)	Jesse Crain (2–2)	Greg Holland (16)	18,622	35–38
74	June 25	Braves	7:10	3–4	Kris Medlen (5–7)	Tim Collins (2–2)	Craig Kimbrel (22)	29,947	35–39
75	June 26	Braves	7:10	4–3 (10)	Aaron Crow (4–3)	Alex Wood (0–2)		22,207	36–39
76	June 27	@ Twins	7:10	1–3	Samuel Deduno (4–2)	Jeremy Guthrie (7–6)	Glen Perkins (20)	28,040	36–40
77	June 28	@ Twins	7:10	9–3	James Shields (3–6)	PJ Walters (2–4)		28,916	37–40
78	June 29	@ Twins	3:10	2–6	Kyle Gibson (1–0)	Wade Davis (4–6)		36,881	37–41
79	June 30	@ Twins	1:10	9–8	Aaron Crow (5–3)	Jared Burton (1–5)	Greg Holland (17)	34,232	38–41

July (15–10)

#	Date	Opponent	Time	Score	Win	Loss	Save	Attendance	Record
80	July 2	Indians	7:10	5–6	Cody Allen (3–0)	Tim Collins (2–3)	Chris Perez (8)	15,625	38–42
81	July 3	Indians	7:10	6–5	Will Smith (1–1)	Cody Allen (3–1)	Greg Holland (18)	28,534	39–42
82	July 4	Indians	1:10	10–7	Luke Hochevar (2–1)	Bryan Shaw (0–2)	Greg Holland (19)	16,792	40–42
83	July 5	Athletics	7:10	3–6	Tommy Milone (8–7)	Wade Davis (4–7)	Grant Balfour (22)	35,518	40–43
84	July 6	Athletics	1:10	4–3	Aaron Crow (6–3)	Ryan Cook (1–2)	Greg Holland (20)	16,606	41–43
85	July 7	Athletics	1:10	4–10	A. J. Griffin (7–6)	Luis Mendoza (2–5)	Jesse Chavez (1)	17,804	41–44
86	July 8	@ Yankees	6:10	5–1	Jeremy Guthrie (8–6)	Phil Hughes (4–8)	Greg Holland (21)	35,057	42–44
87	July 9	@ Yankees	6:10	3–1	James Shields (4–6)	CC Sabathia (9–7)	Greg Holland (22)	35,797	43–44
88	July 10	@ Yankees	6:10	1–8	Iván Nova (4–2)	Wade Davis (4–8)		35,781	43–45
89	July 11	@ Yankees	12:10	4–8	Andy Pettitte (7–6)	Ervin Santana (5–6)		40,381	43–46
90	July 12	@ Indians	6:05	0–3	Corey Kluber (7–5)	Tim Collins (2–4)	Cody Allen (2)	24,077	43–47
91	July 13	@ Indians	6:05	3–5	Scott Kazmir (5–4)	Jeremy Guthrie (8–7)	Chris Perez (12)	29,740	43–48
92	July 14	@ Indians	12:05	4–6	Rich Hill (1–1)	Tim Collins (2–5)	Chris Perez (13)	15,432	43–49
93	July 19	Tigers	7:10	1–0	Ervin Santana (6–6)	Aníbal Sánchez (7–7)	Greg Holland (23)	35,000	44–49
94	July 20	Tigers	6:10	6–5	Jeremy Guthrie (9–7)	Justin Verlander (10–7)	Greg Holland (24)	30,116	45–49
95	July 21	Tigers	1:10	1–4	Doug Fister (8–5)	James Shields (4–7)	Joaquín Benoit (9)	20,513	45–50
96	July 22	Orioles	7:10	2–9	Scott Feldman (9–7)	Wade Davis (4–9)		16,362	45–51
97	July 23	Orioles	7:10	3–2	Bruce Chen (4–0)	Jason Hammel (7–7)	Greg Holland (25)	19,072	46–51
98	July 24	Orioles	7:10	4–3	Luke Hochevar (3–1)	Darren O'Day (5–1)		17,410	47–51
99	July 25	Orioles	7:10	7–1	Jeremy Guthrie (10–7)	Miguel González (8–4)		17,675	48–51
100	July 26	@ White Sox	7:10	5–1	James Shields (5–7)	José Quintana (5–3)		18,342	49–51
101	July 27	@ White Sox	6:10	1–0	Wade Davis (5–9)	Chris Sale (6–10)	Greg Holland (26)	26,172	50–51
102	July 28	@ White Sox	1:10	4–2 (12)	Aaron Crow (7–3)	Donnie Veal (1–1)	Greg Holland (27)	24,079	51–51
103	July 30	@ Twins	7:10	7–2	Ervin Santana (7–6)	Mike Pelfrey (4–9)		33,085	52–51
104	July 31	@ Twins	7:10	4–3	Jeremy Guthrie (11–7)	Caleb Thielbar (1–1)	Greg Holland (28)	32,789	53–51

August (16–15)

#	Date	Opponent	Time	Score	Win	Loss	Save	Attendance	Record
105	August 1	@ Twins	12:10	7–2	James Shields (6–7)	Scott Diamond (5–10)		35,448	54–51
106	August 2	@ Mets	6:10	2–4 (11)	Carlos Torres (2–2)	Luis Mendoza (2–6)		31,032	54–52
107	August 3	@ Mets	12:10	4–3 (12)	Kelvin Herrera (4–5)	David Aardsma (2–1)	Greg Holland (29)	25,095	55–52
108	August 4	@ Mets	12:10	6–2	Ervin Santana (8–6)	Zack Wheeler (4–2)		25,658	56–52
109	August 5	Twins	7:10	13–0	Jeremy Guthrie (12–7)	Kevin Correia (7–8)		21,474	57–52
110	August 6	Twins	7:10	0–7	Andrew Albers (1–0)	James Shields (6–8)		18,924	57–53
111	August 7	Twins	7:10	5–2	Louis Coleman (2–0)	Samuel Deduno (7–5)	Greg Holland (30)	20,198	58–53
112	August 8	Red Sox	7:10	5–1	Bruce Chen (5–0)	Jon Lester (10–7)	Luke Hochevar (2)	21,121	59–53
113	August 9	Red Sox	7:10	9–6	Francisley Bueno (1–0)	Drake Britton (1–1)	Greg Holland (31)	29,485	60–53
114	August 10	Red Sox	6:10	3–5	Brandon Workman (3–1)	Jeremy Guthrie (12–8)	Koji Uehara (12)	38,742	60–54
115	August 11	Red Sox	1:10	4–3	James Shields (7–8)	John Lackey (7–10)	Greg Holland (32)	24,935	61–54
116	August 12	Marlins	7:10	6–2	Wade Davis (6–9)	Tom Koehler (3–8)		15,956	62–54
117	August 13	Marlins	7:10	0–1 (10)	Chad Qualls (3–1)	Kelvin Herrera (4–6)	Steve Cishek (25)	21,094	62–55
118	August 14	Marlins	1:10	2–5	Dan Jennings (2–3)	Tim Collins (2–6)	Steve Cishek (26)	17,760	62–56
119	August 15	@ Tigers	6:05	1–4	Aníbal Sánchez (11–7)	Jeremy Guthrie (12–9)	Joaquín Benoit (16)	37,872	62–57
120	August 16	@ Tigers	12:05	2–1	Danny Duffy (1–0)	Justin Verlander (12–9)	Greg Holland (33)	38,714	63–57
121	August 16	@ Tigers	6:05	3–0	James Shields (8–8)	José Álvarez (1–3)	Greg Holland (34)	40,980	64–57
122	August 17	@ Tigers	6:05	5–6	Joaquín Benoit (3–0)	Aaron Crow (7–4)		41,850	64–58
123	August 18	@ Tigers	12:05	3–6	Max Scherzer (18–1)	Bruce Chen (5–1)		41,740	64–59
124	August 20	White Sox	7:10	0–2	John Danks (3–10)	Ervin Santana (8–7)	Addison Reed (32)	13,060	64–60
125	August 21	White Sox	7:10	2–5	André Rienzo (1–0)	Jeremy Guthrie (12–10)	Addison Reed (33)	13,083	64–61
126	August 22	White Sox	7:10	3–4 (12)	Jake Petricka (1–0)	Luke Hochevar (3–2)	Addison Reed (34)	13,363	64–62
127	August 23	Nationals	7:10	10–11	Tanner Roark (4–0)	Bruce Chen (5–2)	Rafael Soriano (33)	28,733	64–63
128	August 24	Nationals	6:10	2–7	Jordan Zimmermann (15–7)	Wade Davis (6–10)		28,023	64–64
129	August 25	Nationals	1:10	6–4	Kelvin Herrera (5–6)	Craig Stammen (7–6)	Greg Holland (35)	19,661	65–64
130	August 26	Rays	1:10	11–1	Jeremy Guthrie (13–10)	Jeremy Hellickson (10–8)		20,546	66–64
131	August 27	@ Twins	7:10	6–1	James Shields (9–8)	Jared Burton (2–8)		27,006	67–64
132	August 28	@ Twins	7:10	8–1	Danny Duffy (2–0)	Andrew Albers (2–2)		27,379	68–64
133	August 29	@ Twins	12:10	3–1	Bruce Chen (6–2)	Samuel Deduno (8–8)	Greg Holland (36)	28,012	69–64
134	August 30	@ Blue Jays	6:07	2–3	Mark Buehrle (11–7)	Ervin Santana (8–8)	Casey Janssen (25)	21,031	69–65
135	August 31	@ Blue Jays	12:07	2–4	R. A. Dickey (11–12)	Kelvin Herrera (5–7)	Casey Janssen (26)	34,315	69–66

September (17–10)

#	Date	Opponent	Time	Score	Win	Loss	Save	Attendance	Record
136	September 1	@ Blue Jays	12:07	5–0	James Shields (10–8)	J. A. Happ (3–5)		22,961	70–66
137	September 2	Mariners	1:10	3–1	Will Smith (2–1)	Félix Hernández (12–9)	Greg Holland (37)	20,063	71–66
138	September 3	Mariners	7:10	4–3	Luke Hochevar (4–2)	Yoervis Medina (4–4)	Greg Holland (38)	13,638	72–66
139	September 4	Mariners	7:10	4–6	Lucas Luetge (1–2)	Aaron Crow (7–5)	Danny Farquhar (12)	13,621	72–67
140	September 5	Mariners	1:10	7–6 (13)	Louis Coleman (3–0)	Chance Ruffin (0–1)		14,004	73–67
141	September 6	Tigers	7:10	2–16	Aníbal Sánchez (13–7)	James Shields (10–9)		21,358	73–68
142	September 7	Tigers	6:10	4–3	Wade Davis (7–10)	Justin Verlander (12–11)	Greg Holland (39)	20,402	74–68
143	September 8	Tigers	1:10	5–2	Bruce Chen (7–2)	Doug Fister (12–8)	Greg Holland (40)	16,774	75–68
144	September 9	@ Indians	6:05	3–4	Ubaldo Jiménez (11–9)	Ervin Santana (8–9)	Chris Perez (23)	9,794	75–69
145	September 10	@ Indians	6:05	6–3	Jeremy Guthrie (14–10)	Zach McAllister (7–9)	Greg Holland (41)	12,615	76–69
146	September 11	@ Indians	11:05	6–2	James Shields (11–9)	Scott Kazmir (8–8)	Greg Holland (42)	12,085	77–69
147	September 13	@ Tigers	6:05	3–6	Justin Verlander (13–11)	Bruce Chen (7–3)	Joaquín Benoit (19)	40,389	77–70
148	September 14	@ Tigers	6:05	1–0	Ervin Santana (9–9)	Doug Fister (12–9)	Greg Holland (43)	41,841	78–70
149	September 15	@ Tigers	12:05	2–3	Drew Smyly (6–0)	Jeremy Guthrie (14–11)	Joaquín Benoit (20)	40,491	78–71
150	September 16	Indians	7:10	7–1	James Shields (12–9)	Scott Kazmir (8–9)		15,413	79–71
151	September 17	Indians	7:10	3–5	Cody Allen (6–1)	Wade Davis (7–11)	Chris Perez (25)	21,685	79–72
152	September 18	Indians	7:10	7–2	Bruce Chen (8–3)	Danny Salazar (1–3)		21,198	80–72
153	September 20	Rangers	7:10	2–1	Luke Hochevar (5–2)	Jason Frasor (4–3)	Greg Holland (44)	21,837	81–72
154	September 21	Rangers	6:10	1–3	Matt Garza (10–6)	Jeremy Guthrie (14–12)	Joe Nathan (40)	36,575	81–73
155	September 22	Rangers	1:10	4–0 (10)	Tim Collins (3–6)	Neal Cotts (5–3)		27,899	82–73
156	September 23	@ Mariners	9:10	6–5 (12)	Wade Davis (8–11)	Lucas Luetge (1–3)	Greg Holland (45)	12,790	83–73
157	September 24	@ Mariners	9:10	0–4	James Paxton (3–0)	Bruce Chen (8–4)		12,528	83–74
158	September 25	@ Mariners	9:10	0–6	Hisashi Iwakuma (14–6)	Ervin Santana (9–10)		15,347	83–75
159	September 26	@ White Sox	7:10	3–2	Jeremy Guthrie (15–12)	André Rienzo (2–3)	Greg Holland (46)	16,434	84–75
160	September 27	@ White Sox	7:10	6–1	James Shields (13–9)	Chris Sale (11–14)		24,474	85–75
161	September 28	@ White Sox	6:10	5–6	Erik Johnson (3–2)	Yordano Ventura (0–1)	Addison Reed (40)	22,235	85–76
162	September 29	@ White Sox	1:10	4–1	Bruce Chen (9–4)	José Quintana (9–7)	Greg Holland (47)	22,633	86–76

== Player stats ==
=== Batting ===
Note: G = Games played; AB = At bats; R = Runs; H = Hits; 2B = Doubles; 3B = Triples; HR = Home runs; RBI = Runs batted in; SB = Stolen bases; BB = Walks; AVG = Batting average; SLG = Slugging average

Player	G	AB	R	H	2B	3B	HR	RBI	SB	BB	AVG	SLG
Alex Gordon	156	633	90	168	27	6	20	81	11	52	.265	.422
Eric Hosmer	159	623	86	188	34	3	17	79	11	51	.302	.448
Alcides Escobar	158	607	57	142	20	4	4	52	22	19	.234	.300
Billy Butler	162	582	62	168	27	0	15	82	0	79	.289	.412
Salvador Pérez	138	496	48	145	25	3	13	79	0	21	.292	.433
Mike Moustakas	136	472	42	110	26	0	12	42	2	32	.233	.364
Lorenzo Cain	115	399	54	100	21	3	4	46	14	33	.251	.348
David Lough	96	315	35	90	17	4	5	33	5	10	.286	.413
Jarrod Dyson	87	213	30	55	9	4	2	17	34	21	.258	.366
Chris Getz	78	209	29	46	6	1	1	18	16	20	.220	.273
Jeff Francoeur	59	183	19	38	8	2	3	13	2	8	.208	.322
Elliot Johnson	79	162	19	29	2	1	2	9	14	8	.179	.241
Emilio Bonifácio	42	158	21	45	6	2	0	11	16	17	.285	.348
Miguel Tejada	53	156	15	45	5	0	3	20	1	6	.288	.378
George Kottaras	46	100	13	18	4	0	5	12	1	24	.180	.370
Justin Maxwell	35	97	14	26	6	1	5	17	2	11	.268	.505
Johnny Giavotella	14	41	4	9	3	0	0	4	0	5	.220	.293
Jamey Carroll	14	36	5	4	3	0	0	2	0	4	.111	.194
Brett Hayes	5	18	2	5	3	0	1	2	0	0	.278	.611
Pedro Ciriaco	5	11	0	2	1	0	0	0	1	0	.182	.273
Adam Moore	5	10	1	3	1	0	0	0	1	1	.300	.400
Irving Falú	1	4	0	1	0	0	0	0	0	0	.250	.250
Carlos Peña	4	3	0	0	0	0	0	0	0	0	.000	.000
Pitcher totals	162	21	2	6	0	0	0	1	0	0	.286	.286
Team totals	162	5549	648	1443	254	34	112	620	153	422	.260	.379

=== Pitching ===
Note: W = Wins; L = Losses; ERA = Earned run average; G = Games pitched; GS = Games started; SV = Saves; IP = Innings pitched; H = Hits allowed; R = Runs allowed; ER = Earned runs allowed; BB = Walks allowed; SO = Strikeouts

Player	W	L	ERA	G	GS	SV	IP	H	R	ER	BB	SO
James Shields	13	9	3.15	34	34	0	228.2	215	82	80	68	196
Jeremy Guthrie	15	12	4.04	33	33	0	211.2	236	99	95	59	111
Ervin Santana	9	10	3.24	32	32	0	211.0	190	85	76	51	161
Wade Davis	8	11	5.32	31	24	0	135.1	169	89	80	58	114
Bruce Chen	9	4	3.27	34	15	0	121.0	107	46	44	36	78
Luis Mendoza	2	6	5.36	22	15	0	94.0	106	60	56	43	54
Luke Hochevar	5	2	1.92	58	0	2	70.1	41	15	15	17	82
Greg Holland	2	1	1.21	68	0	47	67.0	40	11	9	18	103
Kelvin Herrera	5	7	3.86	59	0	2	58.1	48	27	25	21	74
Tim Collins	3	6	3.54	66	0	0	53.1	49	26	21	28	52
Aaron Crow	7	5	3.38	57	0	1	48.0	49	19	18	22	44
Will Smith	2	1	3.24	19	1	0	33.1	24	16	12	7	43
Louis Coleman	3	0	0.61	27	0	0	29.2	19	2	2	6	32
Juan Gutiérrez	0	1	3.38	25	0	0	29.1	30	13	11	8	17
Danny Duffy	2	0	1.85	5	5	0	24.1	19	5	5	14	22
Yordano Ventura	0	1	3.52	3	3	0	15.1	13	6	6	6	11
Francisley Bueno	1	0	0.00	7	0	0	8.1	4	0	0	2	5
Donnie Joseph	0	0	0.00	6	0	0	5.2	4	0	0	4	7
Chris Dwyer	0	0	0.00	2	0	0	3.0	2	0	0	1	2
Everett Teaford	0	0	0.00	1	0	0	0.2	1	0	0	0	0
Team totals	86	76	3.45	162	162	52	1448.1	1366	601	555	469	1208

== Roster ==
2013 Kansas City Royals
Roster
Pitchers: 67 Francisley Bueno; 52 Bruce Chen; 31 Louis Coleman; 55 Tim Collins; 43 Aaron Crow; 22 Wade Davis; 41 Danny Duffy; 36 Chris Dwyer; 11 Jeremy Guthrie; 27 J. C. Gutiérrez; 40 Kelvin Herrera; 44 Luke Hochevar; 56 Greg Holland; 49 Donnie Joseph; 39 Luis Mendoza; 54 Ervin Santana; 33 James Shields; 53 Will Smith; 25 Everett Teaford; 30 Yordano Ventura	Catchers: 12 Brett Hayes; 26 George Kottaras; 32 Adam Moore; 13 Salvador Pérez; Infielders: 64 Emilio Bonifacio; 16 Billy Butler; 21 Jamey Carroll; 37 Pedro Ciriaco; 2 Alcides Escobar; 19 Irving Falú; 17 Chris Getz; 9 Johnny Giavotella; 35 Eric Hosmer; 23 Elliot Johnson; 8 Mike Moustakas; 23 Carlos Peña; 24 Miguel Tejada	Outfielders: 6 Lorenzo Cain; 1 Jarrod Dyson; 21 Jeff Francoeur; 4 Alex Gordon; 7 David Lough; 27 Justin Maxwell	Manager: 3 Ned Yost; Coaches: 5 George Brett (hitting) (May 30-end of season); 15 Chino Cadahia (bench); 58 Dave Eiland (pitching); 57 Doug Henry (bullpen); 48 Pedro Grifol (assistant hitting); 18 Rusty Kuntz (first base); 26 Jack Maloof (hitting) (beginning of season-May 29); 14 Eddie Rodríguez (third base)

== Farm system ==
Level	Team	League	Manager
AAA	Omaha Storm Chasers	Pacific Coast League	Mike Jirschele
AA	Northwest Arkansas Naturals	Texas League	Brian Poldberg
A	Wilmington Blue Rocks	Carolina League	Vance Wilson
A	Lexington Legends	South Atlantic League	Brian Buchanan
Rookie	Burlington Royals	Appalachian League	Tommy Shields
Rookie	AZL Royals	Arizona League	Darryl Kennedy
Rookie	Idaho Falls Chukars	Pioneer League	Omar Ramírez

LEAGUE CHAMPIONS: Omaha, Idaho Falls
