= Jake Odorizzi =

American baseball player (born 1990)

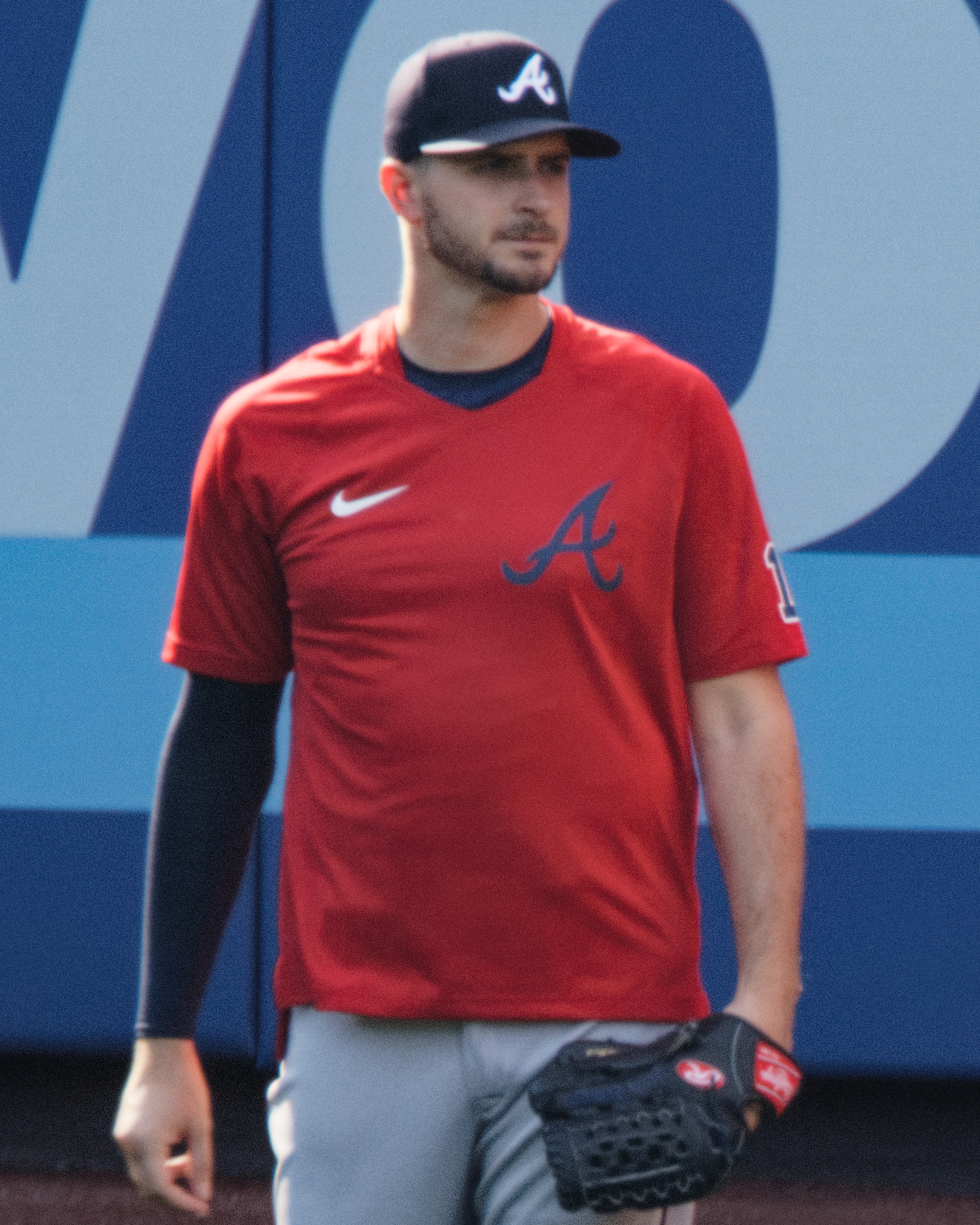
- Odorizzi with the Atlanta Braves in 2022
- Pitcher
- Born: March 27, 1990 (age 36); Breese, Illinois, U.S.
- Batted: Right Threw: Right

MLB debut
- September 23, 2012, for the Kansas City Royals

Last MLB appearance
- October 4, 2022, for the Atlanta Braves

MLB statistics
- Win–loss record: 74–69
- Earned run average: 3.99
- Strikeouts: 1,172
- Stats at Baseball Reference

Teams
- Kansas City Royals (2012); Tampa Bay Rays (2013–2017); Minnesota Twins (2018–2020); Houston Astros (2021–2022); Atlanta Braves (2022)

Career highlights and awards
- All-Star (2019)
Medals
Men's baseball
Representing United States
World Baseball Classic
Gold medal – first place	2017 Los Angeles	Team

Jacob Todd Odorizzi (born March 27, 1990) is an American former professional baseball pitcher. He played in Major League Baseball (MLB) for the Kansas City Royals, Tampa Bay Rays, Minnesota Twins, Houston Astros, and Atlanta Braves. The Milwaukee Brewers selected Odorizzi in the first round, with the 32nd overall choice, of the 2008 MLB draft. He made his MLB debut in 2012 with the Royals.

== Amateur career ==
Odorizzi attended Highland High School in Highland, Illinois, where he helped lead the Highland Bulldogs to the Illinois state championship.

== Professional career ==
=== Milwaukee Brewers ===
The Milwaukee Brewers selected Odorizzi in the first round, with the 32nd overall choice, of the 2008 Major League Baseball draft. He had a 9–9 record, a 3.68 earned run average (ERA), and 197 strikeouts in the three years in the Brewers farm system. He played for the Arizona Brewers in 2008, Helena Brewers in 2009, and the Wisconsin Timber Rattlers in 2010.

=== Kansas City Royals ===
On December 17, 2010, the Brewers traded Odorizzi, Alcides Escobar, Jeremy Jeffress, and Lorenzo Cain to the Kansas City Royals for Zack Greinke and Yuniesky Betancourt. Baseball America ranked Odorizzi as the 69th best prospect in baseball prior to the 2011 season and the 23rd best prospect at midseason. After the 2011 season, he was named the fifth best prospect in the Double-A Texas League. He was named to appear in the 2012 All-Star Futures Game.

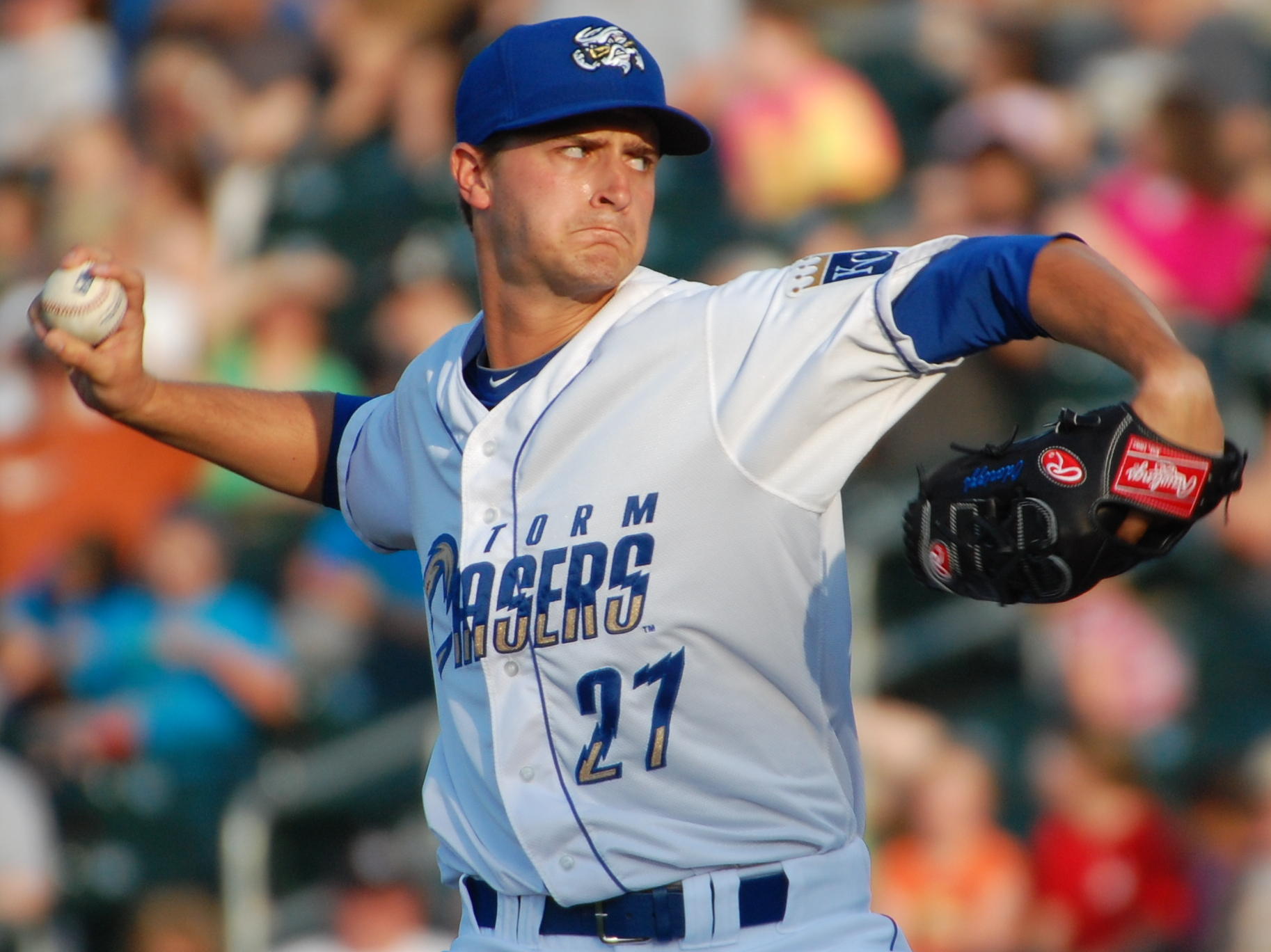
Odorizzi with Omaha in 2012

Odorizzi split time in 2012 between the Double-A Northwest Arkansas Naturals and the Triple-A Omaha Storm Chasers, posting an overall record of 15–5 and a 3.03 ERA. On September 16, 2012, the Royals purchased Odorizzi's contract from Omaha. He made two starts for the team before season's end. He earned the loss in his MLB debut against Cleveland. In two games, both against Cleveland, he pitched 7 1/3 innings

=== Tampa Bay Rays (first stint) ===
On December 9, 2012, the Royals traded Odorizzi along with Mike Montgomery, Patrick Leonard, and Wil Myers to the Tampa Bay Rays for pitchers James Shields and Wade Davis. He was optioned to the Triple-A Durham Bulls on March 12. In early May, he threw a combined no-hitter for the Bulls against the Pawtucket Red Sox. He was recalled by the Rays on May 20 to start in Toronto against the Blue Jays. He was sent back to the Bulls on May 29. He was recalled on August 29 for a start against the Los Angeles Angels of Anaheim, and optioned back to Durham the next day. He was recalled on September 20. Odorizzi spent majority of the 2013 season in the minor leagues posting a 9–6 with a 3.33 ERA in 22 Starts with the Durham Bulls. He got a late call up at the end of 2013, playing in 7 games (4 starts) and had a 3.94 ERA.

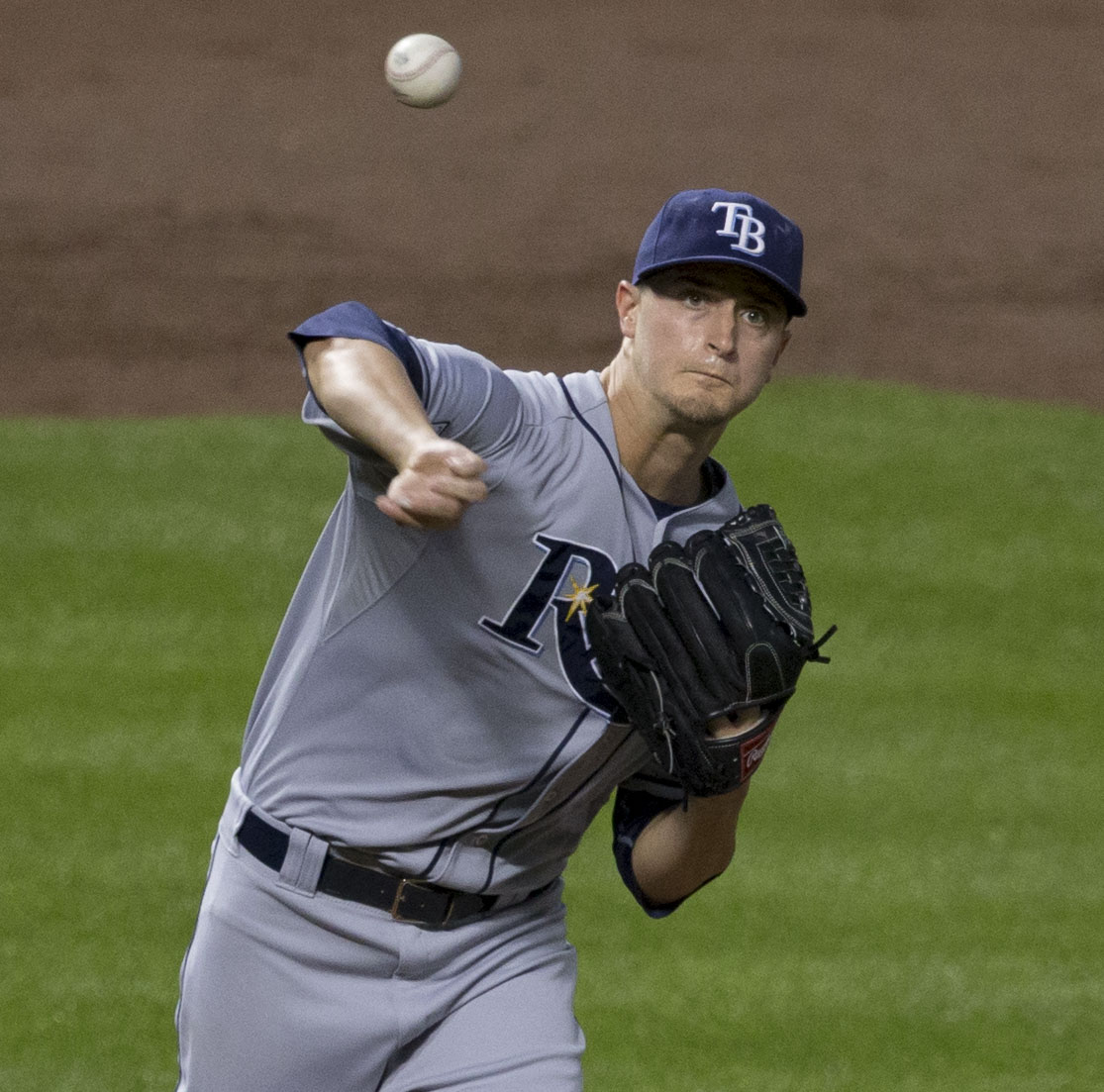
Odorizzi in 2014

In 2014, Odorizzi was the fourth pitcher in the rotation for most of the season. He pitched moderately well, posting an 11–13 won–loss record, and a 4.13 ERA in 33 starts, pitching 168 innings with 174 strikeouts. He came in 8th for AL Rookie of the Year receiving one third place vote.

In the 2015 season, Odorizzi posted a record of 9–9 with an ERA of 3.25 and FIP of 3.16 in 169.1 innings, despite only making 28 starts. He led all major league pitchers in changeup percentage (30.0%).

In the 2016 season, Odorizzi went 10–6 with an ERA of 3.69 in 33 games over 187.2 innings. His 17 no decisions were the most among MLB starting pitchers in 2016.

As of July 26, 2017, 18.3% of all fly balls hit against Odorizzi went for a home run, up 7.2% from his career average (11.1%). As of July 26, his ERA had ballooned to 4.47, a FIP of 5.74, and he had allowed 23 home runs in 18 games. Even with these stats, Odorizzi had a winning record of 6–4. On July 26, the Rays put Odorizzi on the 10-day DL with a lower back strain. On August 9, Odorizzi was activated from the DL. After posting a strong September, going 3–1 with a 1.03 ERA in 26.1 innings, Odorizzi ended the season 10–8 with a 4.14 ERA in 143.1 innings pitched.

=== Minnesota Twins ===
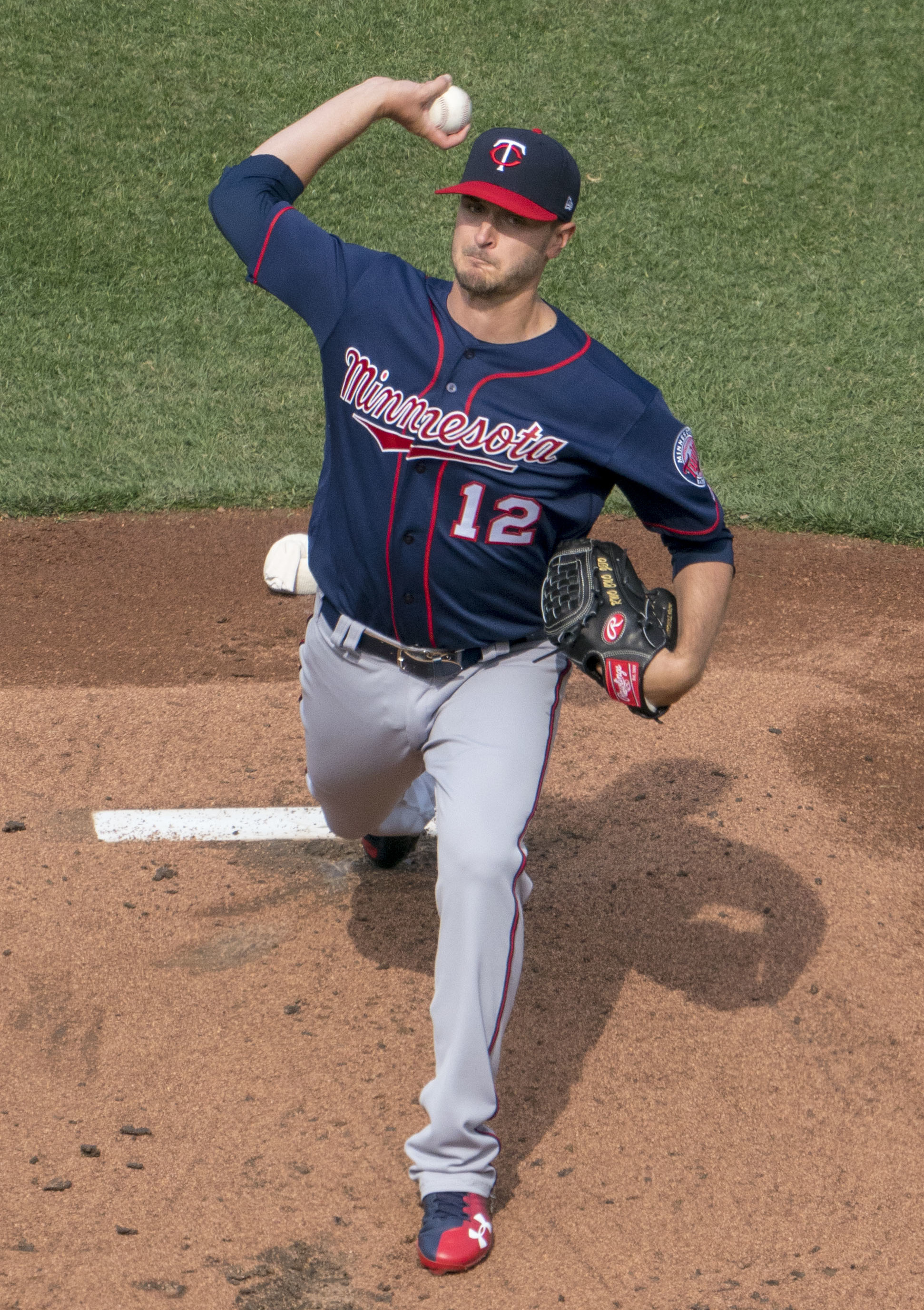
Odorizzi with the Twins in 2018

On February 17, 2018, the Rays traded Odorizzi to the Minnesota Twins for minor leaguer Jermaine Palacios. On September 12, Odorizzi pitched 7 1/3 no-hit innings before Greg Bird of the New York Yankees hit a run-scoring double in the 8th inning. Overall on the season, Odorizzi finished with a 7–10 record and 4.49 ERA in 32 starts. He had the lowest ground ball percentage among major league pitchers (28.4%). He also tied for the major league lead in bunt hits allowed, with six.

In 2019, Odorizzi had a career year despite averaging under 6 innings per start. He finished 15–7 with a 3.51 ERA in 159 innings, striking out a career high 178. On November 14, 2019, Odorizzi agreed to the Minnesota Twins qualifying offer of a one-year, $17.8 million contract.

Odorizzi began the 2020 season on the injured list due to a right intercostal strain and made his season debut on August 8, 2020, against the Kansas City Royals. On August 21, Odorizzi was struck in the chest by a 103.2-mile-per-hour (166.1 km/h) line drive off the bat of Kansas City Royals outfielder Alex Gordon. Odorizzi suffered a right abdomen contusion and was placed on the injured list, missing about a month of action before returning in late September. In his return start on September 16, Odorizzi suffered a blister on his right middle finger and was again placed on the injured list, returning before the Twins' playoff run. Overall in 2020, Odorizzi was limited to 13.2 innings across 4 starts, recording a 6.59 ERA with 12 strikeouts.

=== Houston Astros ===
On March 8, 2021, Odorizzi signed a two-year, $23.5 million contract with the Houston Astros, with a player option for the 2023 season. In 2021, he was 6–7 with a 4.21 ERA in 24 games (23 starts).

Odorizzi won his first game of the 2022 season on April 26 to end a 10-game winless streak spanning since the previous August. He hurled six innings versus the Texas Rangers and allowed one run on one hit . He led a 5–0 win over Detroit on May 8 with a five-inning, one-hit, and five strikeout effort. In a game versus the Boston Red Sox on May 16, Odorizzi fell as he sprinted to cover first base and left the game. He was activated from the injured list on July 4, 2022, after a 42-game absence to start against the Kansas City Royals. In a July 31 start versus the Seattle Mariners, Odorizzi delivered seven shutout innings for a game score of 79, allowing just two hits and one walk while attaining a season-high of eight strikeouts. Odorizzi was traded after the game, but he received a World Series ring for his contributions to the championship that year.

=== Atlanta Braves ===
The Astros traded Odorizzi to the Atlanta Braves for reliever Will Smith on August 2, 2022.

=== Texas Rangers ===
On November 9, 2022, the Braves traded Odorizzi and cash considerations to the Texas Rangers for pitcher Kolby Allard. On April 7, 2023, it was announced that Odorizzi would miss the entire 2023 season after undergoing arthroscopic surgery on his right shoulder.

=== Tampa Bay Rays (second stint) ===
On March 15, 2024, Odorizzi signed a minor league contract with the Rays. After two starts for the Triple–A Durham Bulls, Odorizzi was released by the Rays organization on April 11.

== Pitching style ==
Odorizzi throws five pitches. He leads with a four-seam fastball at 91–96 mph. He also has a cutter (mid 80s), slider (low 80s), splitter (mid 80s), and curveball (low-mid 70s). The slider is mostly used against right-handed hitters, the changeup mostly against left-handed hitters.

Scouts originally regarded his fastball as his best pitch and his changeup as the least developed. With the help of Alex Cobb, Odorizzi developed "the thing": a split-change similar to Cobb's main strikeout pitch. This led to Odorizzi winning the 5th starter's job in spring training in 2014.

== Personal life ==
Odorizzi married Carissa Boxell in November 2012. The couple had their first child, a son, in 2016, and reside in Lutz, Florida.
