= Patrick Leonard (baseball) =

American baseball player

- First baseman / Third baseman
- Born: October 20, 1992 (age 33); Jacksonville, Florida, U.S.
- Bats: Right Throws: Right
- Stats at Baseball Reference

Patrick Thomas Leonard (born October 20, 1992) is an American former professional baseball first baseman.

== High school ==
Leonard attended Bartram Trail High School in St. Johns, Florida, for his freshman year. He transferred to Creekside High School, also in St. John's, for his sophomore year. For his junior year, Leonard was home schooled in order to fit more time in for baseball. He still played for Creekside's baseball team, recording a .452 batting average and a 6–1 win–loss record with a 0.64 earned run average as a pitcher, and was named The St. Augustine Record's St. Johns County Player of the Year. He committed to enroll at the University of Georgia to play college baseball for the Georgia Bulldogs.

Before his senior year, his family moved to Houston, Texas, where Leonard continued his education at St. Thomas High School. As a senior, he opted not to pitch in order to focus on his hitting. He had a .434 batting average, 12 home runs, and 56 runs batted in (RBIs). St. Thomas won the Texas State Class 5A championship.

== Professional career ==
=== Kansas City Royals ===
The Kansas City Royals selected Leonard in the fifth round, with the 156th overall selection, of the 2011 MLB draft. He signed with the Royals, receiving a $600,000 signing bonus, forgoing his commitment to Georgia. Leonard played for the Burlington Royals of the Rookie-level Appalachian League in 2012, and was named to the league's postseason All-Star team.

=== Tampa Bay Rays ===
On December 9, 2012, the Royals traded Leonard to the Tampa Bay Rays alongside Jake Odorizzi, Wil Myers, and Mike Montgomery in exchange for James Shields and Wade Davis. He played for the Bowling Green Hot Rods of the Single–A Midwest League in 2013. In 2014, he played for the Charlotte Stone Crabs of the High–A Florida State League, and was named to the league's all-star game.

Leonard played for the Montgomery Biscuits of the Double–A Southern League in 2015. He began the 2016 season with the Durham Bulls of the Triple–A International League, but was demoted midseason to Montgomery.

Leonard returned to Durham at the start of the 2017 season. He was named the International League Player of the Month for April 2017. In 131 games for the Bulls, he batted .268/.327/.408 with 12 home runs and a career–high 70 RBI. Leonard elected free agency following the season on November 6.

=== Chicago White Sox ===
On November 22, 2017, Leonard signed a minor league contract with the Chicago White Sox. He played in 124 games for the Triple–A Charlotte Knights, batting .242/.315/.395 with 11 home runs and 50 RBI. Leonard elected free agency following the season on November 2, 2018.

=== Milwaukee Brewers ===
On March 5, 2019, Leonard signed a minor league deal with the Milwaukee Brewers.

Leonard did not play in a game in 2020 due to the cancellation of the minor league season because of the COVID-19 pandemic. He was released on June 2, 2020.
