= Mike Montgomery (baseball) =

American baseball player (born 1989)

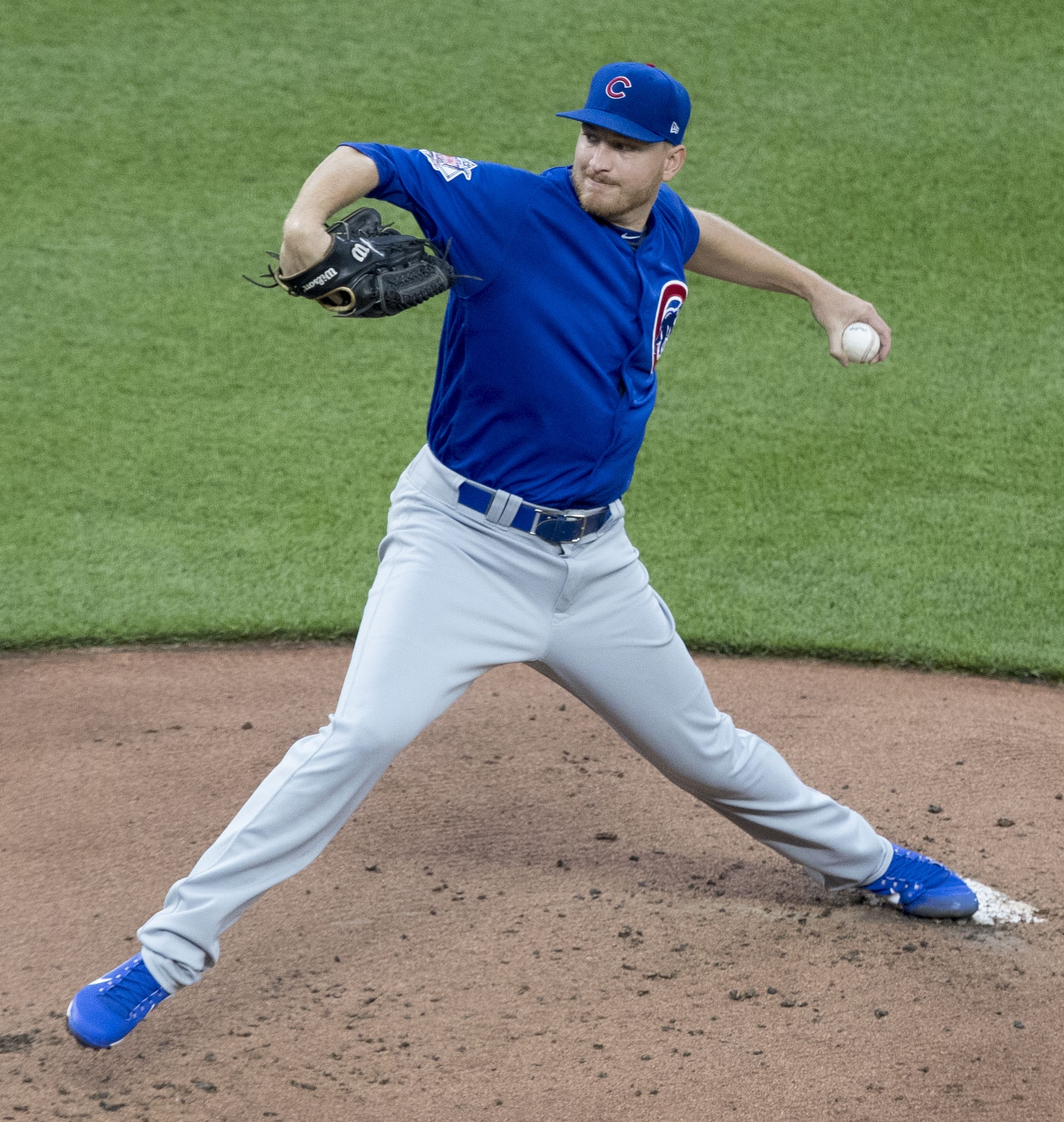
- Montgomery with the Chicago Cubs in 2017
- Pitcher
- Born: July 1, 1989 (age 37); Mission Hills, California, U.S.
- Batted: Left Threw: Left

Professional debut
- MLB: June 2, 2015, for the Seattle Mariners
- KBO: July 3, 2021, for the Samsung Lions

Last appearance
- MLB: September 26, 2020, for the Kansas City Royals
- KBO: October 13, 2021, for the NC Dinos

MLB statistics
- Win–loss record: 23–34
- Earned run average: 3.84
- Strikeouts: 415

KBO statistics
- Win–loss record: 2-5
- Earned run average: 5.37
- Strikeouts: 55
- Stats at Baseball Reference

Teams
- Seattle Mariners (2015–2016); Chicago Cubs (2016–2019); Kansas City Royals (2019–2020); Samsung Lions (2021)

Career highlights and awards
- World Series champion (2016)

Michael Paul Montgomery (born July 1, 1989) is an American former professional baseball pitcher. He played in Major League Baseball (MLB) for the Seattle Mariners, Chicago Cubs, and Kansas City Royals, and in the KBO League for the Samsung Lions.

He was drafted by the Kansas City Royals in the first round of the 2008 MLB draft and made his Major League Baseball (MLB) debut with the Seattle Mariners in 2015. The Mariners traded him to the Chicago Cubs in 2016. Montgomery recorded the final out in Game 7 of the 2016 World Series, earning the save and sealing the Cubs' first World Series title since 1908.

== Professional career ==
=== Kansas City Royals ===
Montgomery was selected by the Kansas City Royals in the first round, with the 36th overall selection, of the 2008 MLB draft out of William S. Hart High School in Santa Clarita, California. In 2012, he posted a combined record of 5–12 in 27 starts while splitting the season between the Double-A Northwest Arkansas Naturals and Triple-A Omaha Storm Chasers. On November 20, 2012, the Royals added Montgomery to their 40-man roster to protect him from the Rule 5 draft.

=== Tampa Bay Rays ===
On December 9, 2012, Montgomery was traded to the Tampa Bay Rays along with Jake Odorizzi, Patrick Leonard, and Wil Myers for pitchers James Shields and Wade Davis. He was optioned to the Triple-A Durham Bulls on March 11, 2013.

=== Seattle Mariners ===
On March 31, 2015, Montgomery was traded to the Seattle Mariners for pitcher Erasmo Ramírez. After an injury sidelined starter James Paxton, the Mariners called Montgomery up to the majors for the first time on June 2, 2015. He started that night against the New York Yankees at Safeco Field, giving up one run, four hits, and walking two while striking out four and leaving after six innings with a 2–1 lead. He was on track to earn his first major league win, but the Mariners lost the game in 11 innings.

On June 23, Montgomery became the first Mariners left-handed pitcher to ever throw a complete game shutout with 10 strikeouts and no walks, getting the win against the Kansas City Royals 7–0. Following his first career complete game shutout, Montgomery pitched his second consecutive shutout on June 30, 2015. He allowed one hit, a double in the 7th inning, to the San Diego Padres in a 5–0 win. He was the first Mariners pitcher since Freddy García in 2001 to throw complete game shutouts in consecutive starts.

Montgomery made the Mariners' opening day roster in 2016 as a reliever.

=== Chicago Cubs ===
On July 20, 2016, the Seattle Mariners traded Montgomery and prospect Jordan Pries to the Chicago Cubs for prospects Daniel Vogelbach and Paul Blackburn. After allowing a three-run home run to the first batter he faced as a Cub, Montgomery performed well during the remainder of the season. He pitched in 17 games (including five starts), with a 2.82 ERA with the Cubs.

Montgomery had a strong postseason performance in 2016, playing an instrumental role in the team's championship run. Cumulatively he went 1–1 in 11 games with a 3.14 ERA in 14 1/3 innings pitched. Notably, Montgomery relieved Carl Edwards Jr. in the bottom of the 10th inning in Game 7 of the World Series. With a runner on first base and two outs in a one-run game, he finished the game with a ground out to third base. Montgomery earned his first professional save, helping the Cubs win the World Series for the first time in 108 years.

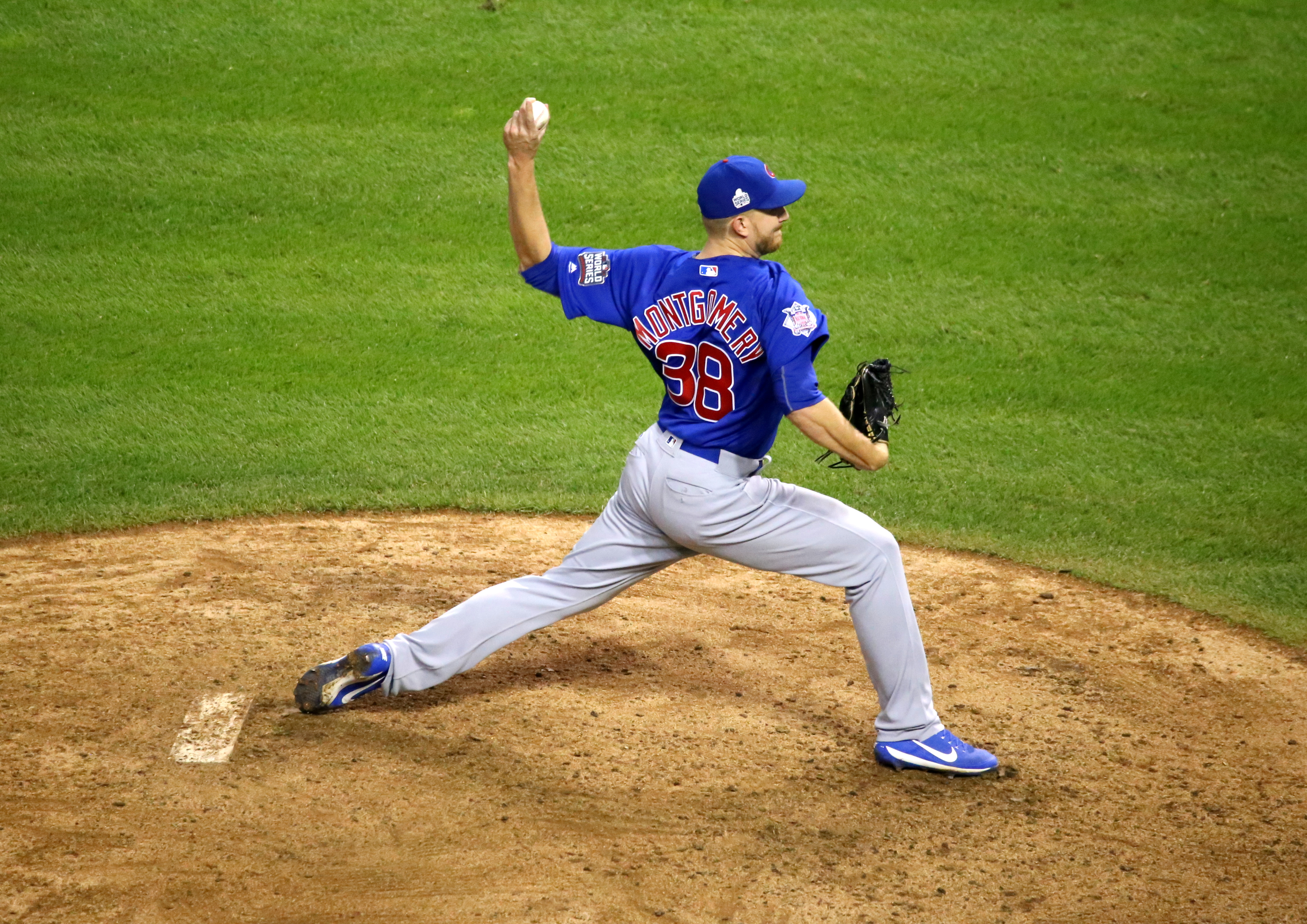
Mike Montgomery pitches the final out in Game 7 of the 2016 World Series.

In 2017, Montgomery made 44 appearances (14 starts) with a 3.38 ERA. His record was 7–8, along with three saves. His performance through mid-May was exceptional, with his ERA dropping to 1.08. After gradually rising to 4.01 in mid-July, it leveled out in the remainder of the season. Montgomery hit his first career home run off Atlanta Braves pitcher R. A. Dickey on July 19.

In contrast with his 2016 performance, Montgomery struggled in the 2017 postseason. Between the Division Series against the Washington Nationals and the League Championship Series against the Los Angeles Dodgers, Montgomery had five appearances and 4 1/3 innings pitched. He allowed three home runs, finishing with a 16.62 postseason ERA.

In 2018, Montgomery had a 5–6 record with a 3.99 ERA in 124 innings. He started the 2019 season with a 1–2 record and a 5.67 ERA in 27 innings.

=== Kansas City Royals (second stint) ===
On July 15, 2019, Montgomery was traded back to the Royals, with the Cubs receiving catcher Martín Maldonado. Despite Montgomery being primarily a reliever and spot starter during his major league career, the Royals used him exclusively as a starting pitcher. He made 13 starts and pitched 64 innings while winning two games and losing seven. With the 2020 Kansas City Royals, Montgomery appeared in 3 games, with 5.06 ERA and four strikeouts in 5 1/3 innings pitched. On October 30, Montgomery was outrighted off the Royals roster and became a free agent.

=== New York Mets ===
On February 14, 2021, Montgomery signed a minor league contract with the New York Mets with an invitation to spring training. On March 28, the Mets released Montgomery.

=== New York Yankees ===
On April 5, 2021, Montgomery signed a minor league contract with the New York Yankees organization. On June 1, Montgomery opted out of his minor league contract and became a free agent. He had recorded a 7.56 ERA in four games for the Triple-A Scranton/Wilkes-Barre RailRiders.

=== Samsung Lions ===
On June 1, 2021, Montgomery agreed to a contract with the Samsung Lions of the KBO League. During a game on September 10, Montgomery was warned about the league's 12-second pitch rule and subsequently ejected. In response to his ejection, Montgomery struck an umpire with a rosin bag and threw his uniform on the field of play before retreating to the clubhouse. He had a 2–5 record and 5.37 ERA in 11 starts for the Lions.

=== New York Mets (second stint) ===
On March 15, 2022, Montgomery signed a minor league contract to return to the New York Mets. He made 22 appearances (17 starts) for the Triple-A Syracuse Mets, struggling to a 2–10 record and 6.72 ERA with 54 strikeouts in 69 2/3 innings pitched. Montgomery elected free agency following the season on November 10.

On February 2, 2023, Montgomery signed with the Acereros de Monclova of the Mexican League. He was released prior to the season on April 18.

=== Los Angeles Dodgers ===
On June 6, 2023, Montgomery signed a minor league contract with the Los Angeles Dodgers organization and was assigned to the Triple-A Oklahoma City Dodgers. He pitched in 18 games (16 starts) for Oklahoma City, logging a 4–4 record and 5.26 ERA with 68 strikeouts across 77 innings. Montgomery elected free agency following the season on November 6.

=== Long Island Ducks ===
On April 30, 2024, Montgomery signed with the Long Island Ducks of the Atlantic League. In 22 games (21 starts) for the Ducks, he posted a 6–7 record and 5.65 ERA with 72 strikeouts over 100 1/3 innings of work. Montgomery became a free agent following the season.

== Personal life ==
Montgomery and his wife, Stephanie, were married in August 2018 during a Cubs off-day. Their first child, a son, was born April 2019.
