= Chris Dwyer =

American baseball player (born 1988)

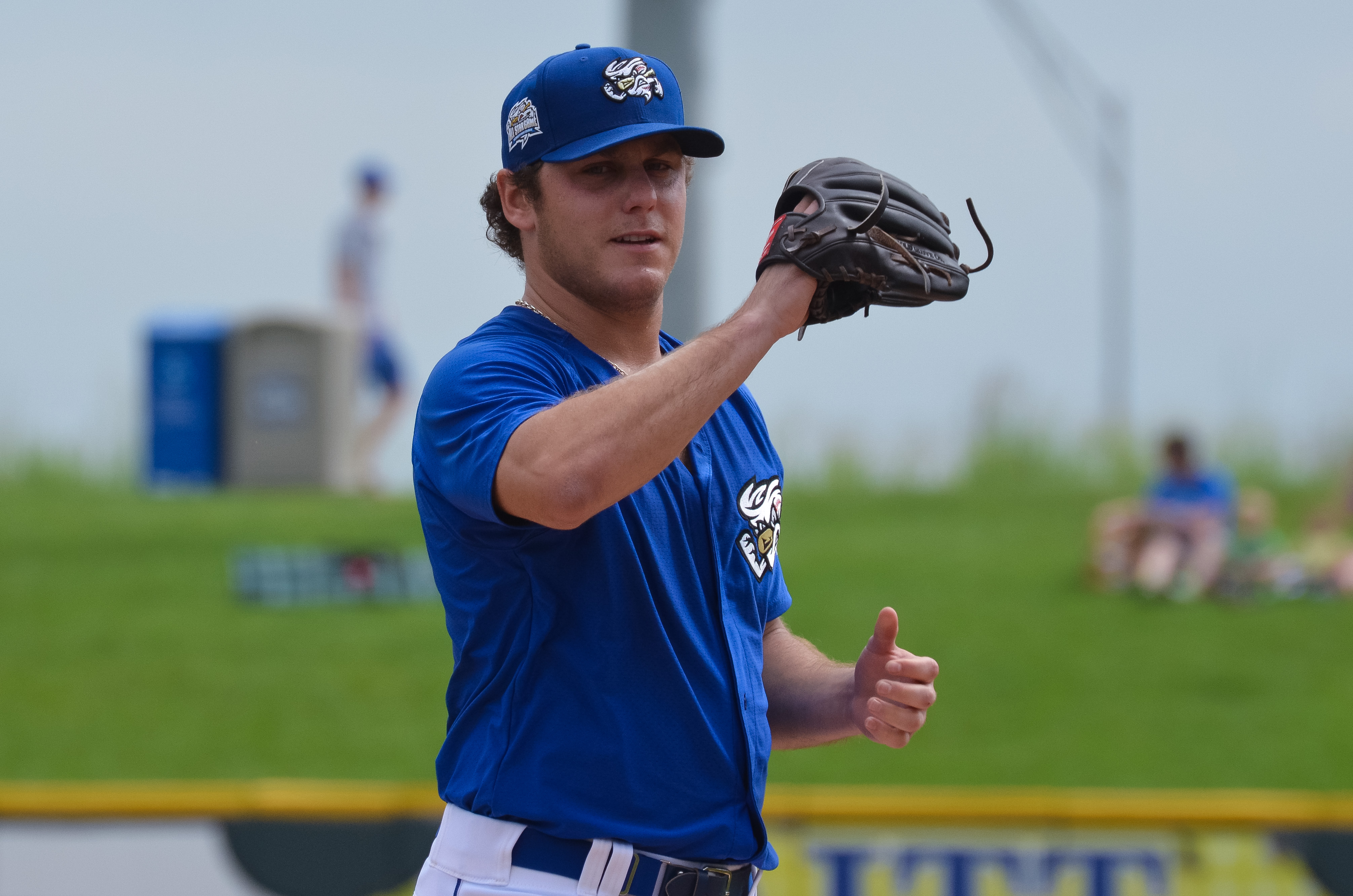
- Dwyer with the Omaha Storm Chasers
- Pitcher
- Born: April 10, 1988 (age 37); Boston, Massachusetts, U.S.
- Batted: Right Threw: Left

MLB debut
- September 24, 2013, for the Kansas City Royals

Last appearance
- September 28, 2013, for the Kansas City Royals

MLB statistics
- Win–loss record: 0–0
- Earned run average: 0.00
- Strikeouts: 2
- Stats at Baseball Reference

Teams
- Kansas City Royals (2013)

Christopher Paul Dwyer (born April 10, 1988) is an American former professional baseball pitcher. He made his Major League Baseball (MLB) debut with the Kansas City Royals in 2013. Prior to playing professionally, Dwyer attended Clemson University, and pitched for the Clemson Tigers.

== Career ==
=== Amateur ===
Dwyer lived in Swampscott, Massachusetts. He played American Legion baseball for the local Swampscott team. He attended St. Mary's High School in Lynn, Massachusetts, and Salisbury School in Salisbury, Connecticut. He stayed with Salisbury for a postgraduate year in 2008. The New York Yankees selected Dwyer in the 36th round of the 2008 Major League Baseball draft, but did not sign. Instead, he attended Clemson University, where he played for the Clemson Tigers baseball team of the Atlantic Coast Conference. In 2009, he played collegiate summer baseball with the Cotuit Kettleers of the Cape Cod Baseball League. As Dwyer turned 21 in 2009, he was eligible to be selected in the 2009 Major League Baseball draft.

=== Kansas City Royals ===
The Kansas City Royals chose Dwyer in the fourth round, and he signed with Kansas City, receiving a $1.45 million signing bonus.

In 2010, Dwyer pitched for the Wilmington Blue Rocks of the High-A Carolina League. Dwyer was rated the 83rd best prospect in baseball by Baseball America prior to the 2011 season, and was invited to Royals' spring training in 2012. Dwyer played for the Omaha Storm Chasers of the Triple-A Pacific Coast League (PCL) in 2013. After Omaha won the PCL championship, Dwyer pitched to victory in the Triple-A Baseball National Championship Game. He retired the first twenty batters he faced without allowing a baserunner, and won the game's most valuable player award. The Royals promoted Dwyer to the major leagues following the game. Dwyer saw two innings as a relief pitcher without earning any runs.

Dwyer was designated for assignment by the Royals on September 1, 2014, following the promotions of Carlos Peguero and Brandon Finnegan. Part of the reason for the demotion was for Dwyer to gain more experience as a relief pitcher since he had previously been a starting pitcher. He cleared waivers and was sent outright to the Triple-A Omaha Storm Chasers on September 9.

In 2015, Dwyer spent the entire season with Triple-A Omaha, posting a 3-3 record and 4.01 ERA with 63 strikeouts in 92.0 innings pitched across 33 games (10 starts). He elected free agency following the season on November 6, 2015.

=== Baltimore Orioles ===
On February 2, 2016, Dwyer signed a minor league contract with the Baltimore Orioles organization.

== Personal ==
Dwyer's sister, Lindsay, played soccer at Williams College.
