= Alex Gordon =

American baseball player (born 1984)

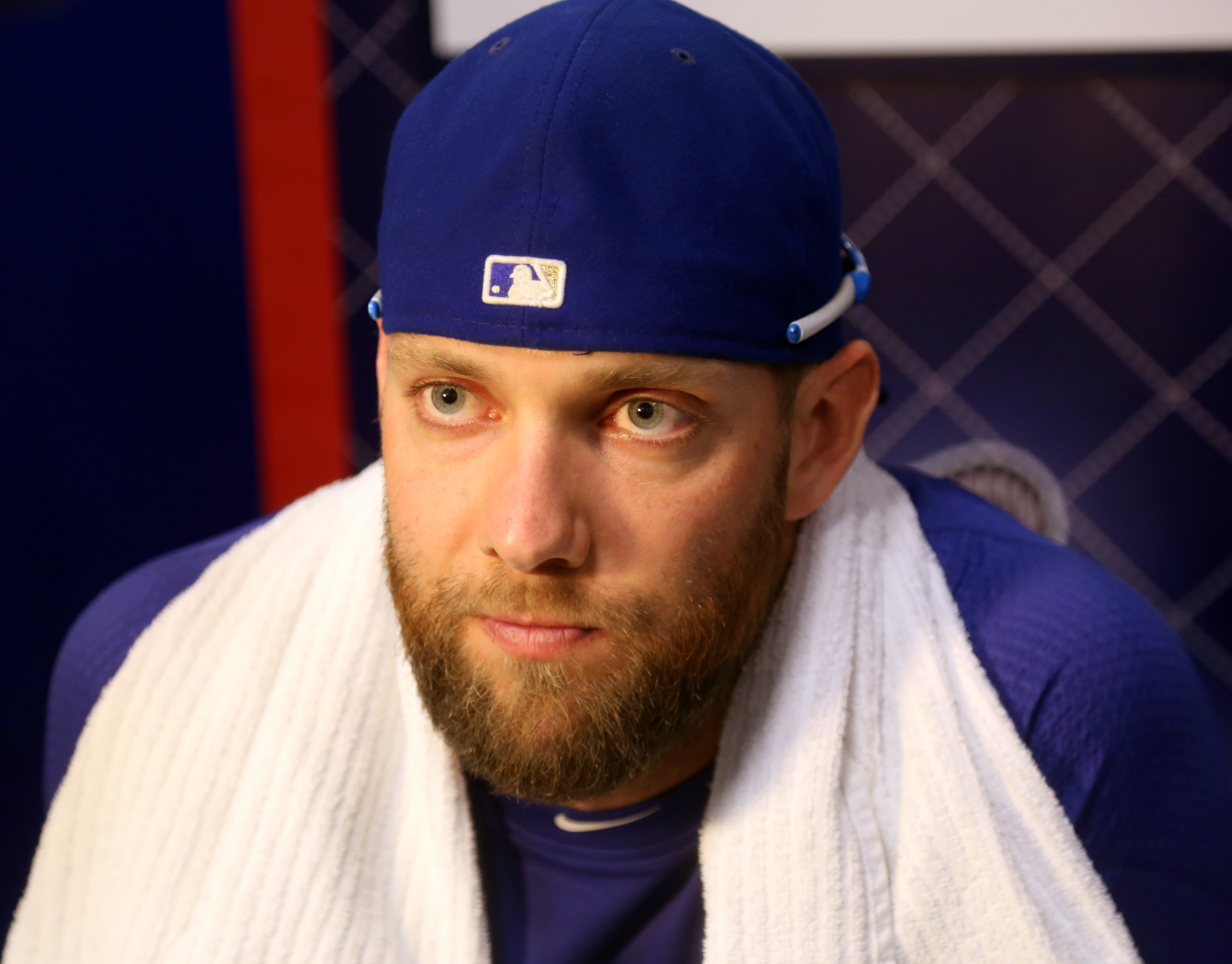
- Gordon in 2015
- Left fielder
- Born: February 10, 1984 (age 42); Lincoln, Nebraska, U.S.
- Batted: Left Threw: Right

MLB debut
- April 2, 2007, for the Kansas City Royals

Last MLB appearance
- September 27, 2020, for the Kansas City Royals

MLB statistics
- Batting average: .257
- Home runs: 190
- Runs batted in: 749
- Stats at Baseball Reference

Teams
- Kansas City Royals (2007–2020)

Career highlights and awards
- 3× All-Star (2013–2015); World Series champion (2015); 8× Gold Glove Award (2011–2014, 2017–2020); Golden Spikes Award (2005); Dick Howser Trophy (2005); Kansas City Royals Hall of Fame
Medals
Men's baseball
Representing United States
World University Championship
Gold medal – first place	2004 Tainan	Team

Alexander Jonathan Gordon (born February 10, 1984) is an American former professional baseball left fielder who played his entire career for the Kansas City Royals of Major League Baseball (MLB) from 2007 to 2020. Prior to playing professionally, Gordon attended the University of Nebraska–Lincoln, where he played college baseball for the Nebraska Cornhuskers.

At Nebraska, Gordon won the Brooks Wallace Award, Dick Howser Trophy, and Golden Spikes Award in 2005. That year, the Royals selected Gordon with the second overall pick in the 2005 MLB draft. Gordon made his major league debut in 2007 as a third baseman, but had an inconsistent beginning to his career. In 2010, the Royals demoted Gordon to the minor leagues for a substantial period of time, and moved Gordon from third base to the outfield. He returned to the Royals later that season as a full-time outfielder, and his play improved substantially. A member of the Royals' 2015 World Series championship team, Gordon signed a four-year free agent contract that offseason to remain with the team. Gordon won eight Gold Glove Awards, two Platinum Glove Awards, four Fielding Bible Awards, and a Wilson Defensive Player of the Year Award, all after the move to the outfield.

In 2024, Gordon was elected as the 31st member of the Royals Hall of Fame.

== Early life ==
Gordon was born on February 10, 1984, to a family heavily involved in baseball. His father played baseball for the Nebraska Cornhuskers, and his brother played college baseball for the Omaha Mavericks. As a child, Gordon's family would sometimes drive from Omaha to attend Kansas City Royals games. Gordon had a successful high school baseball career at Lincoln Southeast High School, where he was named the Gatorade Nebraska Player of the Year in 2002. He was also listed as one of the top high school prospects by Baseball America his senior year and also received All-State honors in football that same year.

During his teen years, Gordon played American Legion Baseball. He won the organization's Graduate of the Year award in 2015.

== College career ==
Gordon attended the University of Nebraska, majoring in criminal justice and playing third base for the university's baseball team. In his junior year in 2005, he swept the collegiate baseball awards for college player of the year, winning the Dick Howser Trophy, Golden Spikes Award, the Brooks Wallace Award, and the American Baseball Coaches Association Rawlings Player of the Year Award. He was also an ESPY Award Finalist for the Best Male College Athlete. Over the course of his collegiate career, he posted a .355 career batting average, with 44 home runs and 189 runs batted in (RBIs) and finished in the top ten in eight different offensive statistical categories at Nebraska. Additionally, Gordon was named the Big 12 Conference Player of the Year in 2004 and 2005 and was named to the First Team All-Big 12 Team in 2004 and 2005.

== U.S. National Team ==
While in college, Gordon was a member of the 2004 United States national collegiate team, which included players from 15 different colleges. He helped lead the U.S. to an 18–7 record, seeing the majority of his playing time at first base. He hit .388 with four home runs, 12 RBI and 18 runs scored in 24 contests and was named the top offensive player at the World University Baseball Championship in Tainan, Taiwan, after leading all players with a .524 average (11-for-21) with two home runs, five RBI, and eight runs scored in eight games.

== Professional baseball career ==
=== Draft and minor leagues ===
Gordon was drafted in 2005 by the Kansas City Royals with the second pick overall, becoming the highest draft pick out of Nebraska since Darin Erstad was selected with the first pick of the 1995 Major League Baseball (MLB) draft. Gordon hit 29 home runs and stole 22 bases with an on-base plus slugging over 1.000 in his first full season in minor league baseball with the Double-A Wichita Wranglers. By midseason, Gordon was receiving accolades for being one of the best hitting prospects in baseball. He participated in the Texas League All-Star game and was selected for the 2006 All-Star Futures Game. Declining to play for Team USA in 2006, Gordon led the Wichita Wranglers to the Texas League playoffs. He performed well in his first full minor league season, and won the Texas League Player of the Year Award and Baseball America's and Topps Minor League Player of the Year Award after the season ended. He also was named the MLB.com Double-A Offensive Player of the Year.

==== 2006 Topps baseball card ====
Gordon's baseball card gained notoriety shortly after Gordon was drafted in 2006. Topps issued Gordon's rookie card prematurely, as only players on 25-man rosters or who have played in at least one major league game are eligible. As a result, Topps stopped producing the card and cut holes in some of the existing cards. Examples that found their way into retail stores have garnered bids in the thousands of dollars on eBay.

=== Major leagues ===
==== Third base: 2007–2009 ====
The Royals moved Gordon through the minor league system quickly, and he made his major league debut in 2007. In his first major league at-bat, Gordon struck out with the bases loaded against Curt Schilling but eventually got his first major league hit on April 5, 2007, against the Boston Red Sox. The hit came against Daisuke Matsuzaka. On April 10, he hit his first major league home run off pitcher Josh Towers of the Toronto Blue Jays. Despite Gordon hitting .185 with three home runs and eight RBI through his first two months as an everyday starter, the Royals remained patient with him.

On September 2, Gordon had the first multi-home run game of his career, connecting off Boof Bonser of the Minnesota Twins in the second inning and in the third inning off Julio DePaula. On September 12, Gordon hit his 34th double of the year against the Minnesota Twins, setting a Royals rookie record. Gordon performed better for the rest of the season, but broke his nose in the last game of the season. Gordon's late-season resurgence brought his batting average up to .247. He also hit 15 home runs and stole 14 bases.

Before the 2008 season, Gordon switched his uniform number from #7, the number he had as a rookie, to #4, his college number. On Opening Day, March 31, 2008, Gordon hit a two-run home run off Detroit Tigers ace Justin Verlander. The Royals placed Gordon on the 15-day disabled list on August 23 because of a torn muscle in his right quadriceps. He would not return to Kansas City until September 12, although he did hit .311 in September. Gordon finished the season with a .260 batting average and 16 home runs and led the Royals with 66 walks. However, he made the most errors (16) and had the lowest fielding percentage (.955) of all American League (AL) third basemen in 2008.

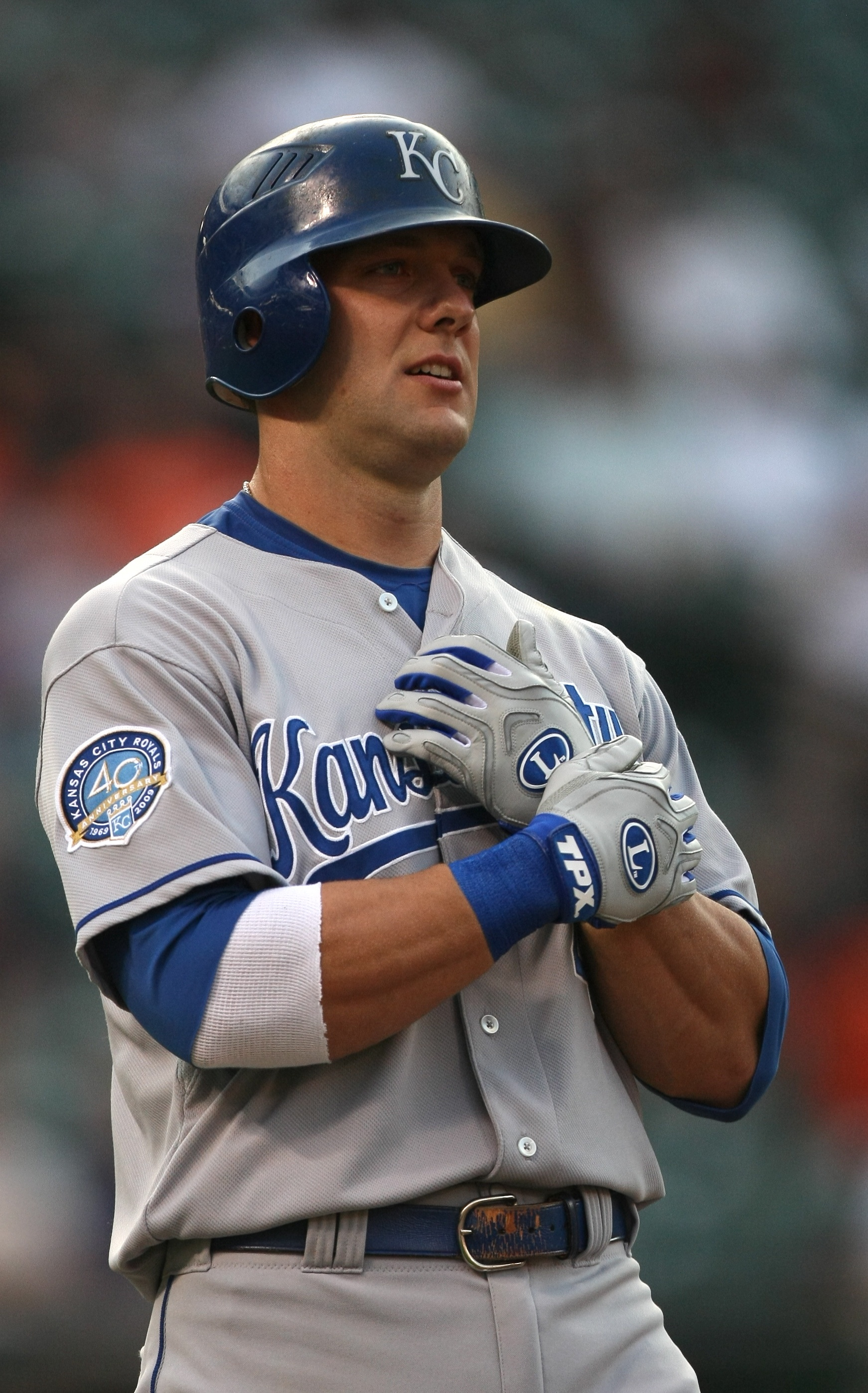
Gordon in 2009

Gordon struggled at the beginning of the 2009 season, hitting just 2-for-21 (.095) with one home run and three RBIs in seven games before being injured while sliding. He underwent surgery on April 17 to repair a tear in the labral cartilage of the right hip and was on the disabled list for 12 weeks. After playing a few games in the minors, Gordon came off the disabled list and rejoined the Royals on July 17, going 1 for 4 against the Tampa Bay Rays. Gordon stole home for the first time in his career on August 2 against the Rays, becoming the first Royal to do that since Mendy López in 2003. The Royals optioned Gordon to the Triple-A Omaha Royals on August 18 to free up a roster space for Kyle Farnsworth. Gordon had a batting average of .198 at his demotion, and had made five errors while appearing in only 29 games. After Omaha finished up its season, Gordon returned to the Royals in September. Gordon got a hit in 15 of the final 20 games he played in and hit home runs in back-to-back games against the Minnesota Twins.

==== Move to outfield: 2010–2013 ====
Following a broken thumb suffered in spring training, Gordon began the 2010 season on a minor league rehab assignment with Class-A Advanced Wilmington. Gordon was activated from the disabled list on April 17. He was demoted to the minor leagues in May, where he played left field. Gordon had been hitting .194 before his demotion, and many considered this demotion to indicate that Gordon was running out of chances with the Royals. Rusty Kuntz, a coach in the Royals' organization stated that "If he can catch a fly ball in this mess, he’s going to be OK." While playing for Omaha, Gordon was named to the Pacific Coast League's All-Star team.

Gordon was recalled from Triple-A on July 23, to replace the injured David DeJesus in the Royals' outfield. On July 30, Gordon hit his first career walk-off home run in a game against the Baltimore Orioles. Gordon hit .264 in the month of August, but then slumped to a .177 batting average during September. Gordon finished the 2010 season with a .215 and eight home runs, having appeared in only 74 games for the Royals.

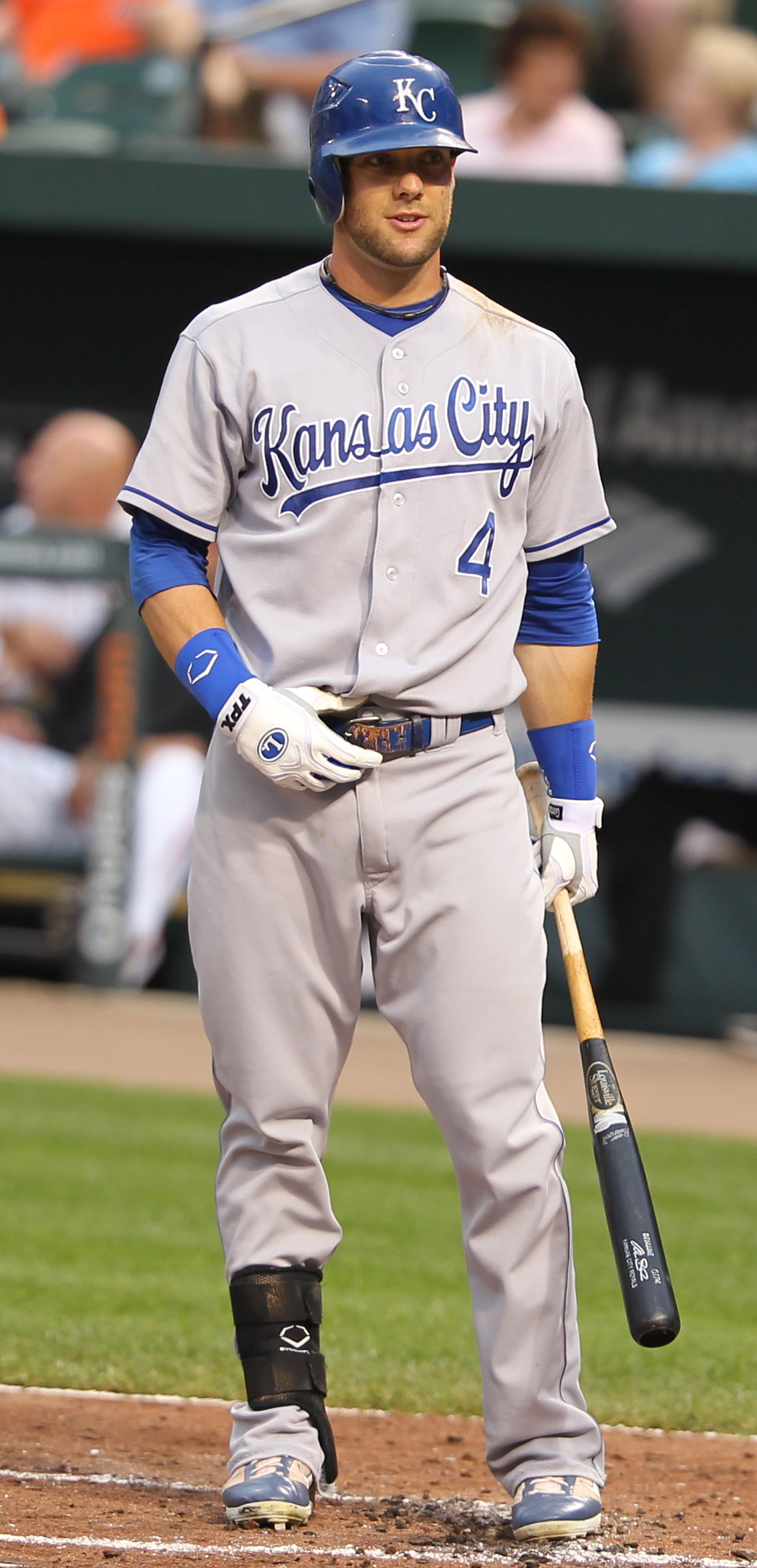
Gordon in 2011

In spring training in 2011, Gordon led the majors with 23 RBIs. 2011 would be a breakout season for Gordon, as his success during Spring Training carried over into the regular season. He would string together a 19-game hitting streak during much of April and hit more doubles than any player for the Royals had since 2007; his 45 doubles was tied for sixth in the major leagues. Gordon was selected as an AL finalist for the 2011 All-Star Final Vote, but Paul Konerko was elected. Gordon played in over 150 games in the season, which was the most games he had played in at the major league level since his rookie year. Gordon set career highs in batting average (.303), runs scored (101), stolen bases (17), and home runs (23). Defensively, he led all major league outfielders in assists, with 20 and won his first AL Gold Glove Award. Gordon's 20 outfield assists were a Royals franchise record.

On February 9, 2012, Gordon signed a one-year, $4.775 million deal with the Royals to avoid arbitration. In the process, Gordon filed for $5.45, while the Royals countered with $4.15. Under the Royals' agreement, he could have earned an additional $25K if he had reached 700 plate appearances, putting him at the original midpoint. However, on March 30, he signed a four-year, $37.5 million extension with the Royals with a player option for 2016. Gordon earned $6 million in 2012, $9 million in 2013, $10 million in 2014 and $12.5 million in 2015, but declined to exercise his player option of $12.5 million for 2016. Gordon would otherwise have become a free agent after 2013.

Despite starting the 2012 season by hitting only .240 through early June, Gordon hit .323 from that point through the remainder of the season. He also drew five walks in a single game against the St. Louis Cardinals on June 17. Gordon finished the 2012 season with a .294 batting average and led the majors with 51 doubles. This tied him with Billy Butler for the second-greatest single-season number of doubles in team history, behind Hal McRae's 1977 season. In 2012, Gordon won a Fielding Bible Award as the best fielding left fielder in MLB. He also won the Gold Glove Award. Gordon's fielding percentage was higher than that of any other player who had played in at least 125 games as a left fielder.

He started the 2013 season strongly by hitting .329 during the first two months of the season. Gordon recorded multiple hits in a game 52 times during the season, and also hit two grand slams–one in April against the Detroit Tigers and one in July against the Cleveland Indians. He finished with the season with 90 runs scored, 168 hits, 27 doubles, six triples, 20 home runs, 81 RBIs, and a .265 batting average. Gordon earned his third consecutive Gold Glove Award for his defense in left field, his second Fielding Bible Award, and earned his first career All-Star selection.

==== Playoff appearances (Back-to-back World Series): 2014–2015 ====
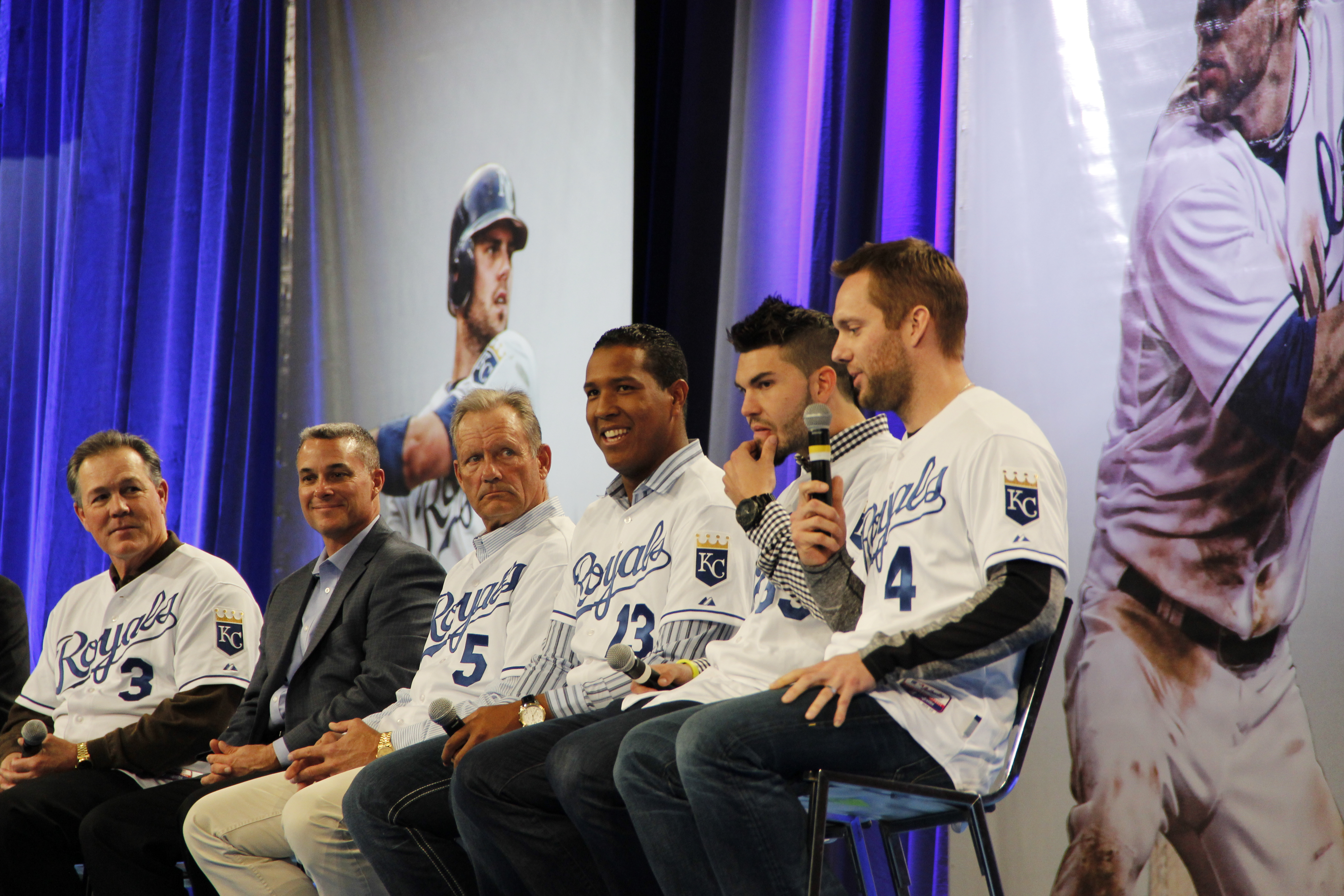
Gordon (right) at the Royals Fan Fest in 2014

In the 2014 season, Gordon scored 87 runs, had 150 hits, 34 doubles, one triple, 19 home runs, 74 RBI, 12 stolen bases, and a .266 BA. On July 6, he was named to the 2014 All-Star Team for the second consecutive year. On August 6, he recorded his 1,000th career hit when he singled off Arizona Diamondbacks pitcher Wade Miley. On August 26, he tied Wade Boggs for the most home runs hit by a Nebraskan in the Major Leagues.

The Royals qualified for the 2014 postseason. Gordon mostly struggled during the playoffs, batting only .204, including six doubles, four stolen bases, and one home run, with the home run coming in the 10th inning of Game 1 of the AL Championship Series (ALCS) against the Baltimore Orioles. Gordon represented the tying run in the 9th inning of Game 7 of the World Series, when with two outs, he lined a long single to left center. He reached third base when Giants' center fielder Gregor Blanco misplayed the ball, but was stranded when catcher Salvador Pérez fouled out to Pablo Sandoval to end the game and the series.

After the end of the 2014 season, Gordon was awarded the Hutch Award for his off-the field actions, including raising over $1 million for a nonprofit organization supporting cancer research and his support of youth baseball in his hometown of Omaha. Gordon was also awarded for his on-the-field performance, receiving the Gold Glove, Fielding Bible, and Platinum Glove awards for his defensive performance.

On July 8, 2015, against Tampa Bay, Gordon was injured attempting to chase down a fly ball hit by Logan Forsythe, which resulted in an inside-the-park home run as Gordon could not get back up. After being carted off the field, he was diagnosed with a left groin strain and was placed on the injured list. Gordon had just come off a seven-hit double header the night before against the Rays (tying the Royals record for most hits in a double header) in which he hit a double and a home run. The injury prevented Gordon from playing in the All-Star game, being replaced on the All-Star roster by Brett Gardner. At the time of the injury, Gordon had a .280 batting average and had hit 11 home runs. On September 2, Gordon was activated from the DL and went 2-for-3, with an RBI and run scored against the Detroit Tigers .

He finished the regular season with a .271 batting average/.377 on-base percentage/.432 slugging percentage with 18 doubles, 13 home runs, and 48 RBIs.

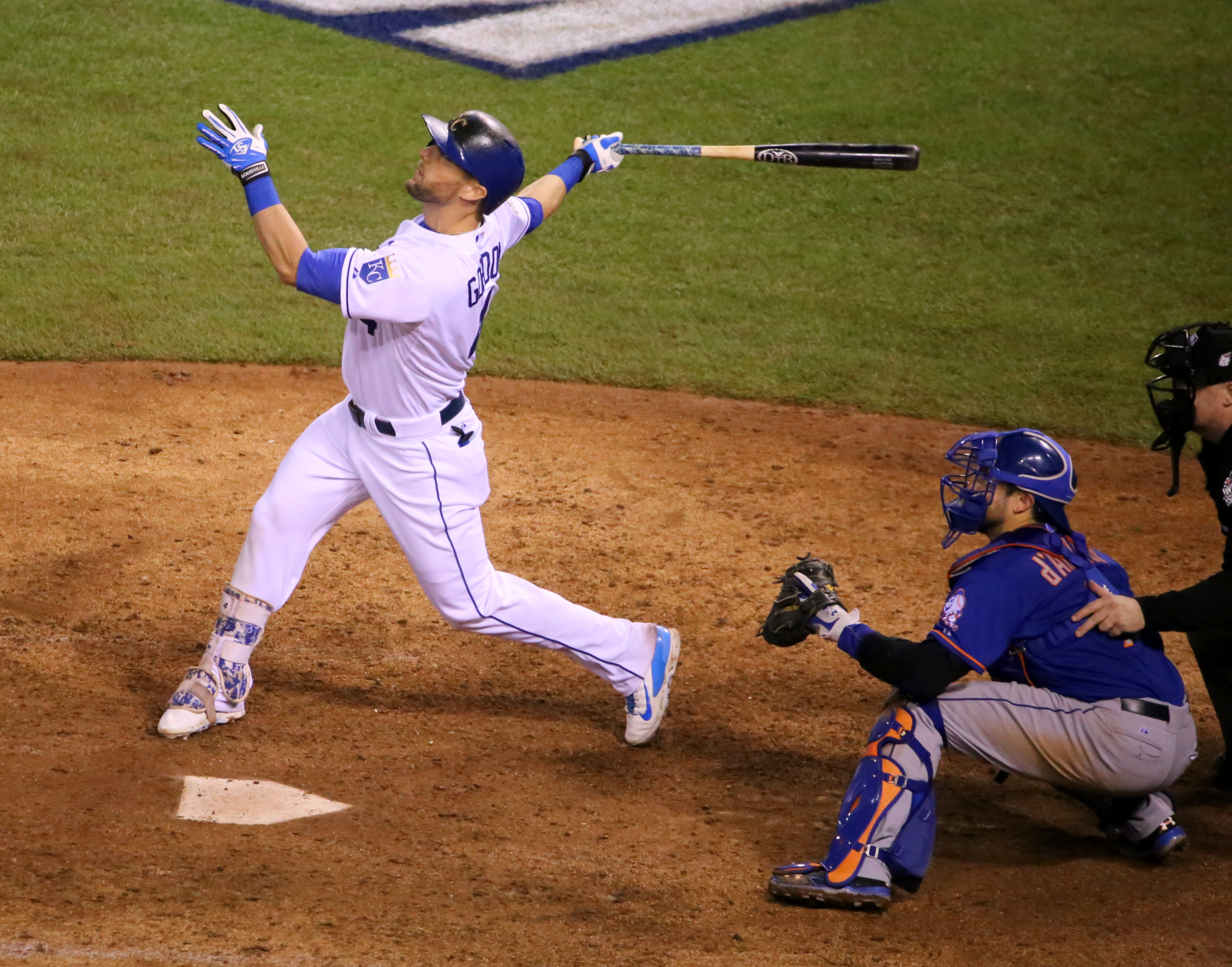
Gordon batting in Game 1 of the 2015 World Series against the New York Mets

The Royals qualified for the postseason in 2015. Gordon hit a home run off of Luke Gregerson in the ninth inning of Game 3 of the 2015 AL Divisional Series. The Royals would go on defeat the Astros in five games, and would defeat the Toronto Blue Jays in the ALCS. Gordon hit .250 in the series against Toronto. In Game 1 of the World Series, Gordon hit a ninth-inning home run off of New York Mets closer Jeurys Familia to tie the game at 4. The Royals would go on to win, 5–4, in 14 innings. Gordon became a world champion when the Royals won the World Series in five games over the Mets, the first World Series won by the Royals since 1985. Combined in the postseason, Gordon hit .241 with 2 homers, 6 RBI and a .775 OPS. Gordon, along with all of the Royals, attended the World Series parade and pep rally at Union Station in downtown Kansas City on November 3.

==== Later career and retirement: 2016–2020 ====
Gordon signed a four-year, $72 million contract with the Royals with a mutual option for the 2020 season on January 6, 2016. On May 22, Gordon collided with Royals' third-baseman Mike Moustakas while chasing a Melky Cabrera pop-up into foul territory down the left field line against the Chicago White Sox. Gordon suffered a scaphoid fracture in his right wrist and was placed on the disabled-list where he missed 29 games. He finished 2016 hitting .220/.312/.380 with a career-high 148 strikeouts in 445 at-bats.

On May 4, 2017, Gordon was hit by a pitch from White Sox's pitcher Derek Holland. This was Gordon's 79th career hit by pitch, breaking Mike Macfarlane's franchise record. When asked about how he was able to be hit by so many pitches, Gordon responded "[I] don't move." While he stated that he did not lean in towards the pitch to give himself a better chance of being hit, Gordon did admit that he had done so during his college career. On September 19, Gordon hit the 5,694th home run of the MLB season against Ryan Tepera, breaking the record for the most home runs in an MLB season, with the previous record having been set in 2000. For the season, he batted .208/.293/.315. His .315 slugging percentage in 2017 was the lowest of all qualified major league batters. Gordon's defense still provided value, as he again won the Gold Glove award.

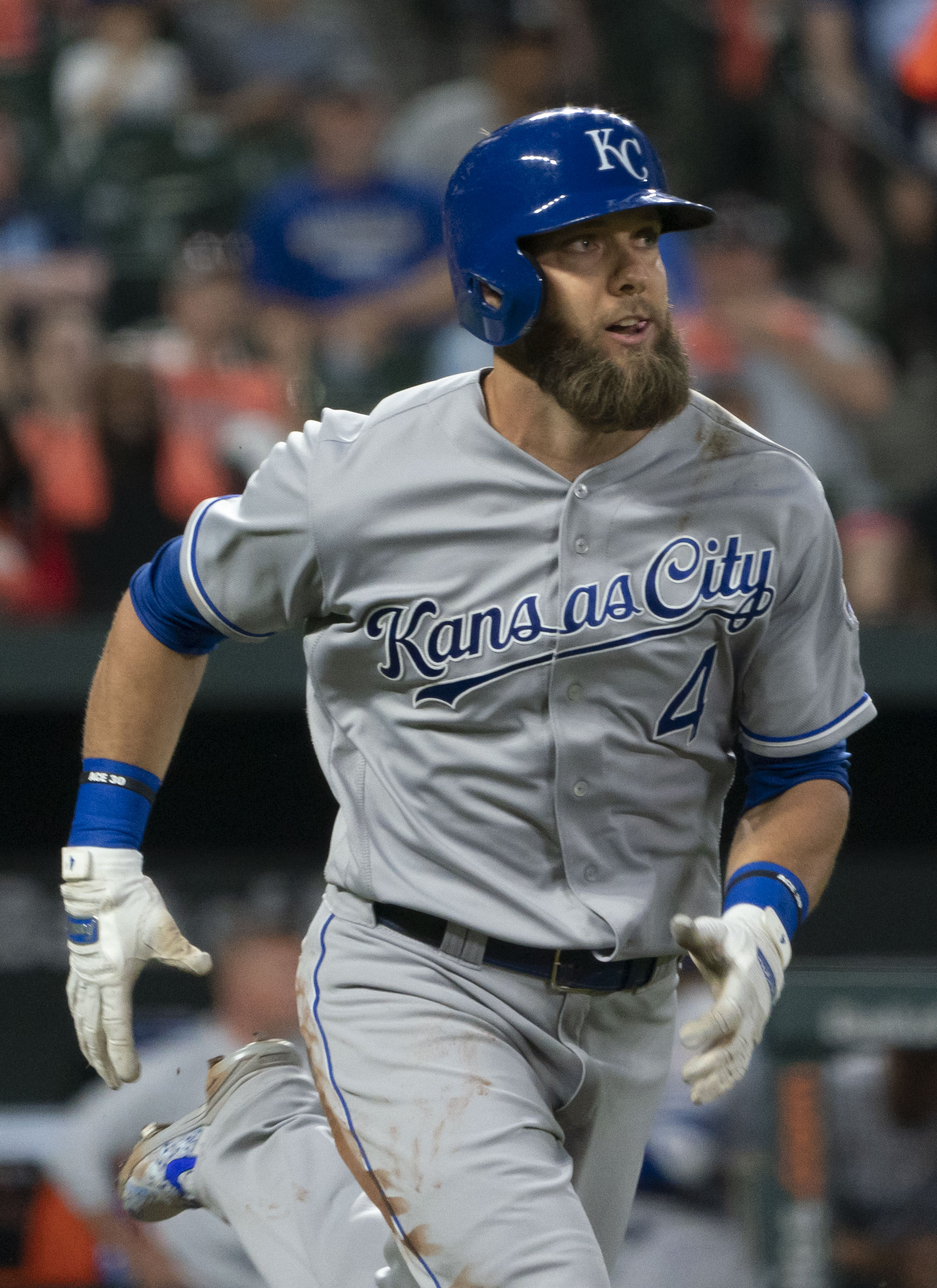
Gordon in 2018

Before the 2018 season, Gordon was inducted into the Lincoln Southeast High School Athletics Hall of Fame. On May 8, Gordon collected a season-high four hits, and he drove in five runs on September 15. In 2018, Gordon hit .245/.324/.370 with 13 home runs and 54 RBIs and won his sixth Gold Glove. Additionally, Gordon also won his fourth Fielding Bible award.

In 2019, Gordon had his best offensive season since 2015. In early April, he recorded his first four-hit game since May 2018. In early May, Gordon hit two home runs, while also reaching 1,500 career hits in the same game, off of Jake Arrieta. In a blowout loss to the Oakland Athletics on August 26, Gordon made his first professional pitching appearance, pitching 1 1/3 innings. Gordon rebounded to hit .266/.345/.396 with 13 home runs and 76 RBIs. He also won his seventh career Gold Glove.

On November 2, 2019, Gordon elected free agency. On January 22, 2020, he signed a one-year, $4 million contract to remain with the Royals. On September 24, Gordon announced that he would retire from baseball at the conclusion of the 2020 season. His final career game was on September 27 against the Detroit Tigers, and received one at-bat in which he struck out to lead off the bottom of the first inning, his first leadoff appearance since April 2017. Gordon then went out to take his position in left field in the top of the second before being pulled back to the dugout and replaced by Franchy Cordero. Overall with the 2020 Kansas City Royals, Gordon batted .209 with four home runs and 11 RBIs in 50 games.

At the time of his retirement, Gordon ranked among the Royals career top 10 in walks, doubles, home runs, hits, runs, totals bases, games played, and RBI. Gordon is one of six Royals position players to play 14 or more seasons for the club, along with Amos Otis, Hal McRae, Willie Wilson, Frank White, and George Brett.

== Personal life ==
Gordon and his wife have two sons and one daughter. They reside in Leawood, Kansas.

== See also ==
- List of Major League Baseball players who spent their entire career with one franchise
