= 2013 Boston Red Sox season =

113th season in the franchise's Major League Baseball history

2013 Boston Red Sox
- World Series champions American League champions American League East champions
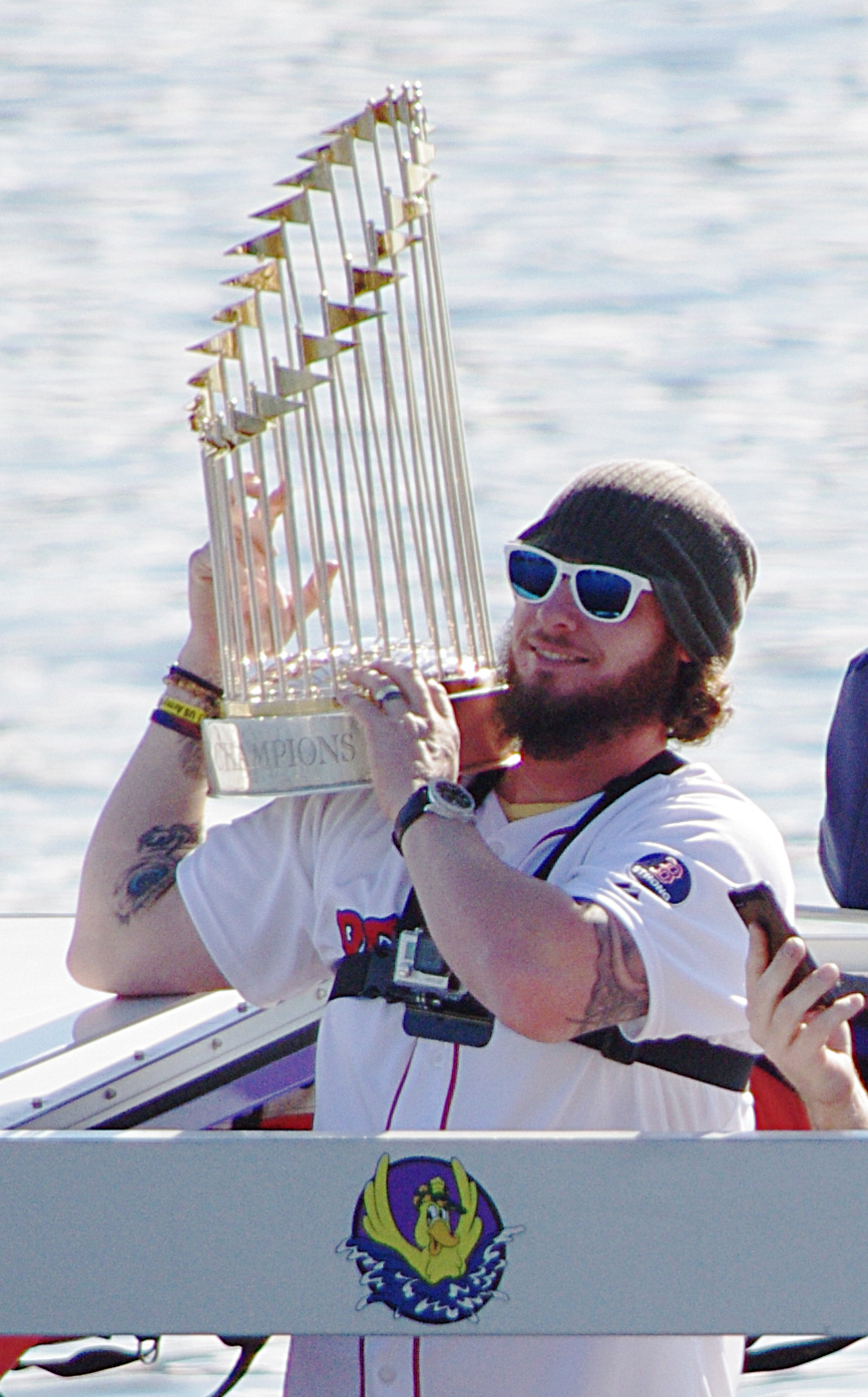
- Jarrod Saltalamacchia lifts the Commissioner's Trophy aboard a duck boat
- League: American League
- Division: East
- Ballpark: Fenway Park
- City: Boston, Massachusetts
- Record: 97–65 (.599)
- Divisional place: 1st
- Owners: John W. Henry (Fenway Sports Group)
- President: Larry Lucchino
- General manager: Ben Cherington
- Manager: John Farrell
- Television: NESN (Don Orsillo, Jerry Remy, Dennis Eckersley)
- Radio: WEEI-FM; Boston Red Sox Radio Network (Joe Castiglione, Dave O'Brien, Sean Grande, Lou Merloni)
- Stats: ESPN.com; Baseball Reference

The 2013 Boston Red Sox season was the 113th season in the franchise's Major League Baseball history. Under new manager John Farrell, the Red Sox finished first in the American League East with a record of 97 wins and 65 losses. In the postseason, the Red Sox first defeated the AL wild card Tampa Bay Rays in the ALDS. In the ALCS, the Red Sox defeated the American League Central champion Detroit Tigers in six games. Advancing to the World Series, the Red Sox defeated the National League champion St. Louis Cardinals in six games, to capture the franchise's eighth championship overall and third in ten years. The Red Sox became the second team to win the World Series the season after finishing last in their division; the first had been the 1991 Minnesota Twins.

The Red Sox led the major leagues in runs scored (853), extra-base hits (570), on-base percentage (.349), slugging percentage (.446) and OPS (.795).

== Offseason ==
=== October ===
- On October 4, 2012, the Red Sox fired Bobby Valentine.
- On October 21, 2012, the Red Sox hired John Farrell to be the new manager of the team.
- On October 21, 2012, the Red Sox traded SS Mike Avilés to the Blue Jays for David Carpenter as part of the compensation for manager John Farrell.

=== November ===
- On November 10, 2012, the Red Sox came to an agreement with former Atlanta Braves catcher David Ross worth $6.2M over two years.
- On November 21, 2012, the Red Sox signed former Oakland Athletics outfielder Jonny Gomes to a two-year contract worth $10 million.

=== December ===
- On December 3, 2012, the Red Sox agreed to terms with former Texas Rangers and Los Angeles Angels catcher and 1st baseman Mike Napoli for a 3-year, $39 million contract. The deal was not official until late January because of his hip problems. The deal was reworked for a 1-year, $5 million contract.
- On December 4, 2012, the Red Sox signed former Philadelphia Phillies and Los Angeles Dodgers outfielder Shane Victorino for a 3-year, $39 million contract.
- On December 6, 2012, the Red Sox signed former Baltimore Orioles and Texas Rangers relief pitcher Koji Uehara to a deal.
- On December 17, 2012, the Red Sox signed former Arizona Diamondbacks and Oakland Athletics shortstop Stephen Drew to a 1-year, $9.5 million deal.
- On December 19, 2012, the Red Sox signed former Chicago Cubs starting pitcher Ryan Dempster to a 2-year, $26.5 million deal.
- On December 26, 2012, the Red Sox acquired closer Joel Hanrahan and second baseman/shortstop Brock Holt from the Pittsburgh Pirates in exchange for relief pitcher Mark Melancon, 1st baseman/outfielder Jerry Sands, infielder Iván DeJesús, Jr., and pitcher Stolmy Pimentel.

=== January ===
- On January 31, 2013, the Red Sox signed veteran first baseman Lyle Overbay to a one-year minor league contract.

=== February ===
- On February 20, 2013, the Red Sox acquired former Seattle Mariners first baseman Mike Carp for cash considerations.

== Regular season highlights ==
=== Season standings ===
AL East
Team	W	L	Pct.	GB	Home	Road
Boston Red Sox	97	65	.599	—	53‍–‍28	44‍–‍37
Tampa Bay Rays	92	71	.564	5½	51‍–‍30	41‍–‍41
New York Yankees	85	77	.525	12	46‍–‍35	39‍–‍42
Baltimore Orioles	85	77	.525	12	46‍–‍35	39‍–‍42
Toronto Blue Jays	74	88	.457	23	40‍–‍41	34‍–‍47

Division winners
Team	W	L	Pct.
Boston Red Sox	97	65	.599
Oakland Athletics	96	66	.593
Detroit Tigers	93	69	.574

Wild Card teams (Top 2 teams qualify for postseason)
Team	W	L	Pct.	GB
Cleveland Indians	92	70	.568	+½
Tampa Bay Rays	92	71	.564	—
Texas Rangers	91	72	.558	1
Kansas City Royals	86	76	.531	5½
New York Yankees	85	77	.525	6½
Baltimore Orioles	85	77	.525	6½
Los Angeles Angels	78	84	.481	13½
Toronto Blue Jays	74	88	.457	17½
Seattle Mariners	71	91	.438	20½
Minnesota Twins	66	96	.407	25½
Chicago White Sox	63	99	.389	28½
Houston Astros	51	111	.315	40½

=== Record vs. opponents ===
2013 American League record Source: MLB Standings Grid – 2013
Team	BAL	BOS	CWS	CLE	DET	HOU	KC	LAA	MIN	NYY	OAK	SEA	TB	TEX	TOR	NL
Baltimore	—	11–8	4–3	3–4	4–2	4–2	3–4	5–2	3–3	9–10	5–2	2–4	6–13	5–2	10–9	11–9
Boston	8–11	—	4–2	6–1	3–4	6–1	2–5	3–3	4–3	13–6	3–3	6–1	12–7	2–4	11–8	14–6
Chicago	3–4	2–4	—	2–17	7–12	3–4	9–10	3–4	8–11	3–3	2–5	3–3	2–5	4–2	4–3	8–12
Cleveland	4–3	1–6	17–2	—	4–15	6–1	10–9	4–2	13–6	1–6	5–2	5–2	2–4	5–1	4–2	11–9
Detroit	2–4	4–3	12–7	15–4	—	6–1	9–10	0–6	11–8	3–3	3–4	5–2	3–3	3–4	5–2	12–8
Houston	2–4	1–6	4–3	1–6	1–6	—	2–4	10–9	1–5	1–5	4–15	9–10	2–5	2–17	3–4	8–12
Kansas City	4–3	5–2	10–9	9–10	10–9	4–2	—	2–5	15–4	2–5	1–5	4–3	6–1	3–3	2–4	9–11
Los Angeles	2–5	3–3	4–3	2–4	6–0	9–10	5–2	—	1–5	3–4	8–11	11–8	4–3	4–15	6–1	10–10
Minnesota	3–3	3–4	11–8	6–13	8–11	5–1	4–15	5–1	—	2–5	1–6	4–3	1–6	4–3	1–5	8–12
New York	10–9	6–13	3–3	6–1	3–3	5–1	5–2	4–3	5–2	—	1–5	4–3	7–12	3–4	14–5	9–11
Oakland	2–5	3–3	5–2	2–5	4–3	15–4	5–1	11–8	6–1	5–1	—	8–11	3–3	10–9	4–3	13–7
Seattle	4–2	1–6	3–3	2–5	2–5	10–9	3–4	8–11	3–4	3–4	11–8	—	3–3	7–12	3–3	8–12
Tampa Bay	13–6	7–12	5–2	4–2	3–3	5–2	1–6	3–4	6–1	12–7	3–3	3–3	—	4–4	11–8	12–8
Texas	2–5	4–2	2–4	1–5	4–3	17–2	3–3	15–4	3–4	4–3	9–10	12–7	4–4	—	1–6	10–10
Toronto	9–10	8–11	3–4	2–4	2–5	4–3	4–2	1–6	5–1	5–14	3–4	3–3	8–11	6–1	—	11–9

Red Sox vs. National League
Team	NL West					
Team	ARI	COL	LAD	SDP	SFG	PHI
Boston	2–1	3–1	2–1	3–0	2–1	2–2

=== Opening Day ===
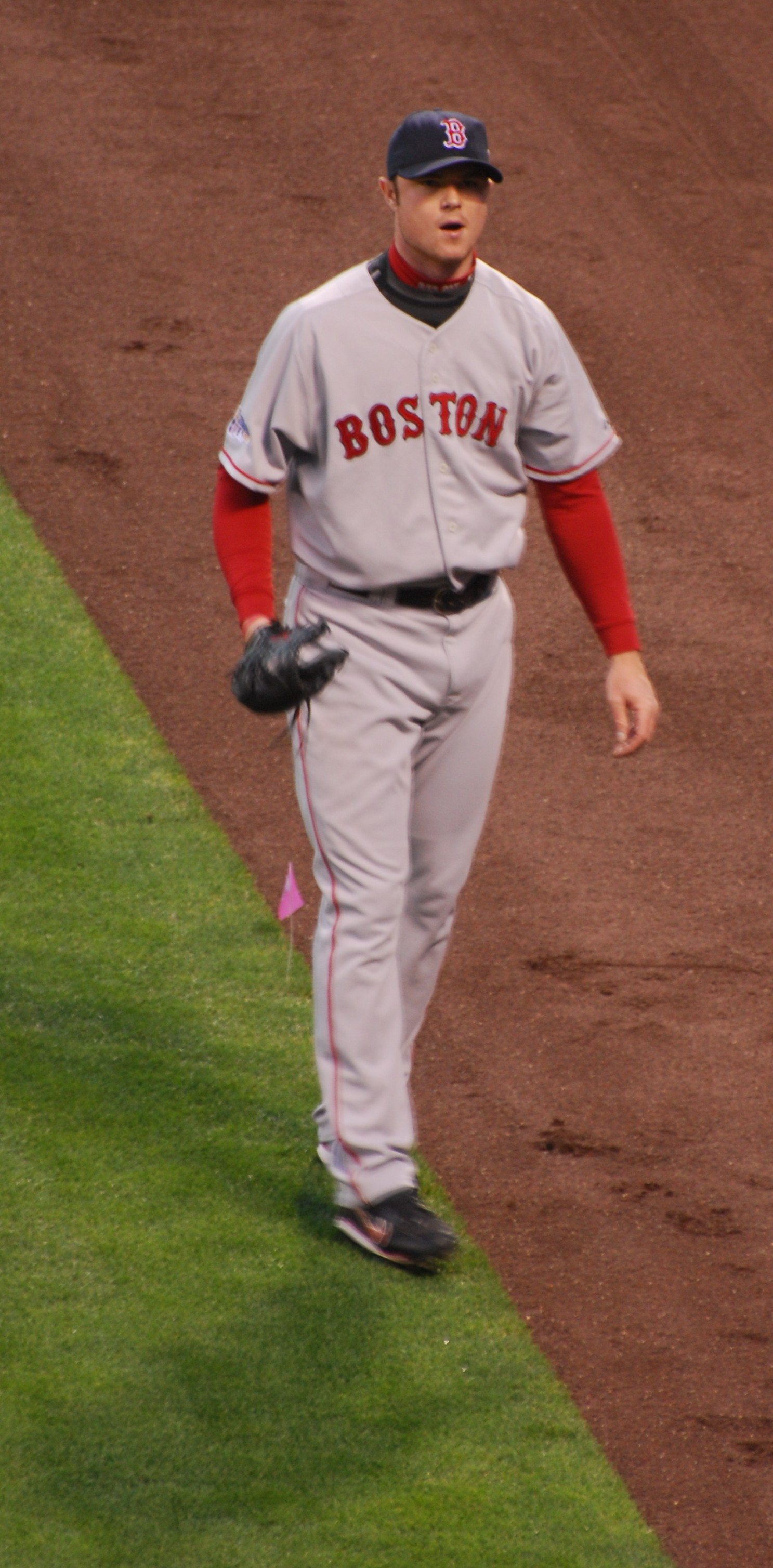
Opening Day starter Jon Lester

The 2013 Red Sox season opened on April 1, with an afternoon road game against the New York Yankees. Jon Lester went five innings, leading to an 8–2 win for the Red Sox. This was Boston's first Opening Day victory since 2010.

==== Opening Day lineup ====
2	Jacoby Ellsbury	CF
18	Shane Victorino	RF
15	Dustin Pedroia	2B
12	Mike Napoli	1B
16	Will Middlebrooks	3B
39	Jarrod Saltalamacchia	C
5	Jonny Gomes	DH
44	Jackie Bradley Jr.	LF
10	José Iglesias	SS
31	Jon Lester	P

=== April ===
Following their Opening Day triumph, the Red Sox improved to 2–0 on Wednesday, April 3, in the second tilt of the three-game series, in a game that saw offseason acquisition Joel Hanrahan rack up his first save as a Red Sox. Boston failed to complete the sweep, however, with starting pitcher Ryan Dempster relinquishing a 4–2 defeat in his Red Sox debut the following evening. In Toronto, the Sox split the first two games of a series against the Blue Jays on April 5 and 6, winning 6–4 in the first game and falling 5–0 in the second. Boston was then victorious in the rubber game, shutting out the Jays 13–0.

The Red Sox won their fourth straight against the Cleveland Indians on April 16. The Red Sox and Indians wore black armbands to honor the victims of the Boston Marathon bombing. A giant American flag flew at half-mast before the series opener with a moment of silence prior to the first pitch. A young Indians fan presented the Red Sox with a sign he wrote in red ink and ornamented with hearts. The note, which was hung in Boston's dugout, read: "From our city to your city: Our hearts and prayers go out to you, Boston. Love, Cleveland." For the entire game, a jersey with No. 617 (one of Boston's area codes), displaying "Boston" above the numerals and "Strong" below them, hung in the Sox' dugout. Additionally, to commemorate Jackie Robinson Day, both teams wore No. 42 jerseys. The Red Sox also placed closer Joel Hanrahan on the disabled list with a hamstring injury.

The Red Sox swept two consecutive series between April 13–18. One at home against the Tampa Bay Rays and another on the road against the Cleveland Indians, resulting in a six-game winning streak which improved their record to 11–4, and put them in first place in the American League East.

The Red Sox had a scheduled weekend series against the Kansas City Royals during April 19–21. The immediate Greater Boston area went on a citywide lockdown in search of a suspect in the Boston Marathon bombing on the morning of April 19 and the first game of the weekend was postponed. The Red Sox reported the decision was made "to support efforts of law enforcement officers." A make-up date for the game was not immediately announced.

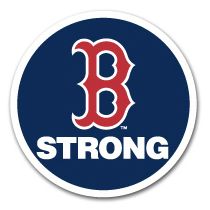
Patch worn in memory of Boston Marathon Bombing victims

However, with the second suspect captured that same evening and Fenway Park under tight security, play resumed Saturday, April 20 with a win of 4–3 by Boston over the Royals (assisted by a go-ahead three-run home run by Daniel Nava). Both teams honored the victims of the bombing tragedy by wearing special uniforms/logos. The Red Sox wore white home jerseys with "Boston" on the front instead of the customary "Red Sox" while Kansas City players and staff wore a "B Strong" patch on the front of their jerseys, with the shirts being auctioned off for funds to support victims of the bombing. Following a pregame ceremony, the Red Sox won their sixth straight game, their best start in 11 years with the win against Kansas City. David Ortiz was bothered by inflammation in both heels during spring training and didn't play in any exhibition games, but he was 2 for 4 in his return, tying the score 1-all with a sixth-inning RBI single off James Shields. The Red Sox later announced Friday's (April 19) game would be made up as part of a day-night doubleheader on Sunday (April 21). The regularly scheduled game took place at 1:35 p.m., and a nightcap at 7 p.m.

On April 21, Kansas City ended Boston's seven-game winning streak with a 4–2 win over the Red Sox in the opener of a day-night doubleheader. The Royals ended a season-opening streak of 16 games by Red Sox starters allowing three runs or less, tying an AL record achieved by the Oakland Athletics in 1978 and 1981. Red Sox RF Shane Victorino missed his first game of the season after leaving the game on April 20 with back spasms.

In the second game of the doubleheader, Kansas City narrowly beat Boston 5–4 in 10 innings to win the weekend series (and sweep the doubleheader), as a result of Lorenzo Cain walking with two outs and bases loaded in the 10th inning. Even with both wins against the Red Sox on April 21, Boston remained in first place in the AL East as did Kansas City in the AL Central. Dustin Pedroia reached base in all their first 18 games, the most consecutive games to start a season by a Red Sox 2B (breaking the record set by Pete Runnels in 1959). Koji Uehara went 18 1/3 scoreless innings before allowing Billy Butler's homer in the eighth inning of the night game. In his first two at bats on the day game, Jonny Gomes used a bat with the words "Boston Strong" on it as well as the names of the four people killed in the bombing and its aftermath. He popped out and grounded out, then said he planned to auction off the bats for charity.

Opening a new series against Oakland, the Red Sox came out victorious (9–6) in the first game on April 22. They were defeated (13–0) in a rain-shortened 7-inning game on April 23. Boston proceeded to win the rubber game of the series on April 24 by a score of 6–5.

The Red Sox swept a four-game home stand on April 25–28 against the Astros, their first series against Houston since the Astros moved to the American League West. The sweep improved Boston's record to 18–7.

The Red Sox closed April by falling, 9–7, on the road to the Blue Jays.

=== May ===
Boston opened the month of May in the middle of a three-game road series against Toronto. Having lost the first game on April 30, the Red Sox won the next two games 10–1 and 3–1 on May 1 and 2. Traveling to Texas to take on the Rangers, the team was shut out for the third time of the season, relinquishing 7 runs and 18 hits to Texas on May 3. The Rangers took the next two games, on May 4 and 5, by respective scores of 5–1 and 4–3. This marked the first time Boston was swept in the 2013 season. The Red Sox' May slide continued when they lost three of four games at home against Minnesota from May 6–9. They closed out their weeklong homestand by losing 2 of 3 to the Blue Jays from May 10–12. On Sunday, May 12, the Red Sox' new 2013 starting pitcher, Ryan Dempster, fell to 2–4 in a game in which Boston relinquished 12 runs.

Traveling to Tampa Bay, the Red Sox recovered by taking two of three games from the Rays from May 14–16. Boston scored three runs in the top of the 9th inning on May 16. Opening a weekend series in Minnesota against the Twins, the Red Sox posted another come-from-behind victory on May 17, tying the game in the 7th inning and scoring the winning run in the 10th. Boston swept the series with 12–5 and 5–1 triumphs on May 18 and 19, improving their winning streak to five games and their record to 27–17. Boston then closed out their road trip with a three-game series against the Chicago White Sox. The Red Sox lost the first two games on May 20 and 21, but avoided the sweep in a 6–2 victory on May 22 that brought starting pitcher Clay Buchholz's record to 7–0. The Red Sox welcomed 2004–11 manager and two-time World Series champion manager Terry Francona back to Fenway Park on May 23 as they hosted Francona's new team, the Cleveland Indians. Francona received a standing ovation in the first game of the four-game series. Boston fell to Cleveland in a lopsided 12–3 loss on May 23, but proceeded to triumph in the following three matches on May 24, 25 and 26 to win the four-game series. On Memorial Day, May 27, the Red Sox opened a four-game home-and-home series against Philadelphia, the team's first interleague series of 2013. The Phillies are considered Boston's interleague "rival", playing the Red Sox every season. The first two games of the series were held at Fenway Park, with the Red Sox winning on May 27 but then losing, 3–1, on May 28, in a game in which former Boston closer Jonathan Papelbon was awarded a save. Papelbon repeated the feat again on May 29 as the series shifted to Philadelphia. These were Papelbon's second and third saves against the Red Sox since leaving the team; he recorded the other on May 18, 2012. Boston evened the four-game series with a 9–2 victory on Thursday, May 30. Center fielder Jacoby Ellsbury set a Red Sox record with five stolen bases in the game. The Red Sox closed out the month of May with a road loss against the archrival Yankees.

=== June ===
Boston's series in the Bronx continued on June 1 and 2, and the Red Sox racked up two victories to take the three-game series. The Sox pounded the Yankees, 11–1, on June 1, and prevailed, 3–0, in a rain-shortened six-inning game on June 2 that was eventually called due to thunderstorms. Clay Buchholz's record remained spotless at 8–0. Coming home to Fenway Park, the Red Sox took 2 of 3 games from the Texas Rangers from June 4–6, including a 17–5 romp. On June 8, Boston faced the Los Angeles Angels of Anaheim in a day-night doubleheader, losing the first game but winning the second as Buchholz's aforementioned perfect record improved to 9–0. To close out the series, the Red Sox gave Angels starting pitcher Joe Blanton his tenth loss of the season in a 10–5 victory on June 9. The condensed two-day series and day-night doubleheader were necessitated by effects from Tropical Storm Andrea which rained out the scheduled Friday, June 7 game.

Heading back out on the road, the Red Sox played a 14-inning game on national television as ESPN's Monday Night Baseball covered the 10–8 victory over the Tampa Bay Rays at Tropicana Field. This was the second longest game by time in Rays history. The Red Sox gave up a 6–0 lead after a first inning in which the first eight Boston batters all reached base, and then Andrew Bailey had a blown save in the 10th inning, giving up two Tampa Bay runs. Eventually, well after midnight, the Red Sox scored two runs in the top of the 14th which were unanswerable by the Rays in the bottom half of the inning. The Red Sox then split the two remaining games of the series to win 2 of its 3 games. Boston lost 3 of 4 games in a road series against Baltimore from June 13–16. After losing 3 out of 4 in a tough series to the Detroit Tigers, the Red Sox would go to win 5 of their next 6 in June and extending that streak for 9 out of 10 into July, which included a walk-off home run against the San Diego Padres by Jonny Gomes.

=== July ===
After sweeping the San Diego Padres the Red Sox headed west for a 10-game road trip and extended the winning streak to 5 games with a win against the Los Angeles Angels. On the following day Boston dropped a 4-run lead with 2 outs in the bottom of the 9th against the Halos, with Koji Uehara's second blown save out of six save opportunities since taking over the closer role from Andrew Bailey on June 21, and ultimately lost the game 9–7 in the 11th inning. Boston then lost the following 2 games against Los Angeles (splitting the season series 3–3 in the process) and the Seattle Mariners before starting a 4-game winning streak, taking 3 out of 4 games against the M's and the first game of the series against the A's. The 4-game series in Seattle saw the first Major League win for pitcher Steven Wright and the first appearance of Brandon Workman in the big leagues. Workman had his first start only 4 days later against the Oakland Athletics, taking a no-hit bid to the 7th inning. In Oakland the Red Sox bats went cold, scoring only 6 runs in 3 games, and losing the remaining 2 games which led to a season series split of 3–3. Boston headed with a 58–39 record to the All-Star break, leading the AL with 1 game ahead of the Athletics (56–39) and with most wins in the majors, just ahead of the St. Louis Cardinals with 57–36, who entered the break with the best record.

Following the All-Star break the Red Sox played the Yankees for the first time at Fenway in 2013. Like the previous two series in the Bronx, Boston could take 2 out of 3 games against New York. Mike Napoli secured the series win in the rubber match with a walk-off home run in the bottom of the 11th. With 1.5 games behind Boston, Tampa Bay visited the Fens for their third and final time. The Rays took game one and shrunk the lead to just .5 games, the smallest margin since Boston took over the lead in the AL East on May 27. In game 2 the Red Sox put themselves back to a 1.5 game lead, including Shane Victorino's steal of home in a delayed double steal with Dustin Pedroia, who agreed to a seven-year contract extension through the 2021 season a day later. Tampa Bay threatened the AL East lead again by taking game 3 but game 4 was rain delayed and later postponed to the scheduled off day on July 29, after Boston's 3 game road trip to Camden Yards and Rays' trip to the Bronx. In game one against Baltimore, the only team in the AL East Boston had a losing record against at that time, the Red Sox were shut out for the fourth time in July (with four shutouts in all of April, May and June combined) and lost the AL East top spot for the first time since May 27. Boston battled back and took game 2 with Stephen Drew going yard twice for the second time in his career in a single game. Game 2 also saw the ejection of David Ortiz in the top of the 7th, following an argument over balls and strikes with homeplate umpire Tim Timmons and the destruction of a dugout phone with his bat. In the rubber match, Big Papi homered for the 20th time that season, his 12th consecutive season with 20+ home runs and his 11th with Boston, joining Dwight Evans and Jim Rice but still behind Ted Williams, who accomplished this feat in 16 seasons with the Red Sox. Jon Lester earned his 10th individual win, the first Red Sox pitcher to reach that mark in 2013, and Boston were able to shut out the Orioles and reclaimed the AL East lead just to give it back the next day to the Rays in the makeup match of the 4-game series in which the Red Sox fell victim to a controversial call at home plate. Umpire Jerry Meals incorrectly ruled Daniel Nava out which would have tied the game in the 8th inning. The Red Sox wrapped up the month of July at home with back-to-back wins against the Mariners, including a 15 inning game (the longest season game to date for the Red Sox). Both games saw the first major league wins for Brandon Workman, in his third start, and Drake Britton respectively. On July 30, Boston acquired starting pitcher Jake Peavy from the White Sox in a three-way deal, sending infielder José Iglesias to the Tigers and Avisaíl García from Detroit to Chicago.

=== August ===
August started just like July ended, with a walk-off win against the Mariners. In the series finale, the Red Sox were trailing by five in the ninth, but scored six runs for their 11th walk-off win in 2013. This was the biggest ninth inning come from behind victory since the 2007 Mother's Day Miracle against the Orioles and the biggest eighth inning comeback, trailing by 6, since July 3, 1940, against the Athletics, at that time still located in their origin city Philadelphia. Despite winning the first two series against the Diamondbacks and the Astros the Red Sox played .500 ball for the first 3 1/2 weeks of August. The interleague series against Arizona saw the first start for newly acquired starting pitcher Jake Peavy, who tied the series with a strong performance after the D-Backs took game one, with the winning run driven in by former Red Sox player Cody Ross. In a combined effort of Doubront and the bullpen, Boston shut-out the team from the NL West. With no off-day the Red Sox headed west to play the Astros for the first time in Minute Maid Park as a team of the American League. In a slugging fest, with 25 runs and 26 hits of both teams combined, Boston took game two after completely failing to score in game one and took the series in game three with a come from behind victory in the ninth. Slowly crawling their way back east the Red Sox stopped for a four-game series in Kansas City dropping 3 games before heading to Toronto, dropping two out of three against the AL East rival but still maintaining a 2-game lead over the Rays. On their second visit to Boston, the Yankees clinched their first series of the season against the fierce rival by taking two games out of three. Red Sox lost their season tying three series in a row.

The tides turned when Boston headed to the west coast for a three-game series against the 2012 World Series champion San Francisco and the, to that time, red hot Dodgers. Lester with the help of Workman shut-out the Giants in game one before the Red Sox dropped game two and giving the AL East lead to the Rays but earning the lead back holding San Francisco to a single run in game three. In game one in Los Angeles Boston could not score but were able to take game two and three, inflicting the Dodgers first series loss since June 16.

Back home in Boston the Red Sox took two out of three against Baltimore and the two remaining games in August against the White Sox for their 28th series win that season and a 4 1/2-game lead over the Rays in the AL East.

=== September ===
Boston swept the White Sox and extended the AL East lead to 5 1/2 games but ended a streak of 11 games allowing only three runs or less. Another streak however continued in game one of the home series against the Tigers. John Lackey received absolutely no run support for the fifth time of his last 11 starts and four or less runs in the ninth game over the same stretch. Allowing only one run and handing Max Scherzer just his second loss of the season, the Red Sox took game two and exploded in game three, scoring 20 runs, a season high amongst all Major League teams, on 19 hits including 8 long balls. On their last trip to the Bronx, Boston headed into the seventh with a five-run lead, but the combination of Peavy, Thornton and Tazawa could not stop the Yankees from scoring 6 runs. Down on their last strike, Boston scored against New York's closer Mariano Rivera in the ninth and took game one in extra frames. Down by five, Boston scored nine runs in two innings, including a grand slam by Mike Napoli and took game two. In search for run support the offense gave Lackey 13 runs in game three, the most in any start for him this season, to extend the winning streak to five and extending the lead in the AL East to a season-high 8 1/2 games but failed to sweep the four-game set when Workman gave up a walk-off wild pitch in the bottom of the ninth after Rivera suffered his second blown save in the series while trying for a two-inning save. Buchholz returned to the rotation three months after his last start on June 8 and protected his undefeated season record in game one of a three-game series in St. Peterburg by allowing, with the help of the relievers, no runs. In game two Mike Carp hit a game-deciding pinch-hit grand slam in the tenth but Boston failed to sweep the Rays in the series finale.

Back at Fenway Park for the last regular season home stand, Jarrod Saltalamacchia became the third Red Sox player within a week to hit a grand slam, breaking a tie in the seventh against the Yankees, and Koji Uehara set a new franchise record by retiring his 37th consecutive batter. Jon Lester and Clay Buchholz then secured the series sweep by back-to-back strong outings. Lester allowed only one run on three hits, while Buchholz allowed only one unearned run on two hits. Struggling again against the Orioles, Boston dropped the first two games before John Lackey posted a two hit gem and the Red Sox clinched a spot in the postseason. With a Tampa Bay loss, the Red Sox cut the magic number for winning the division down to 1. A day later the Red Sox clinched their first AL East title since 2007 by beating the Toronto Blue Jays 6–3. In game two Buchholz suffered his first loss of the season, albeit allowing only three runs, two of them earned. Boston secured the series with a 5–2 win on their last regular season home game.

On their last interleague trip, the Red Sox split the two-game series against the Colorado Rockies, losing game one but winning game two, scoring 15 runs. Will Middlebrooks posted two home runs, including the fifth grand slam in the month of September for Boston, and David Ortiz collected his 100th RBI on the season. On September 27, the Red Sox secured home field advantage for the American League Division Series by beating the Orioles 12–3. Ortiz hit his 30th home run of the season, making it his seventh season with 30 HR/100 RBI, tying Ted Williams for the club record. A day later, the Red Sox secured home field advantage throughout the playoffs thanks to a 7–5 loss by the Oakland A's to the Seattle Mariners, making the last two games virtually pointless. Boston lost both games, giving up a 5–0 lead in the fifth in game three. The Red Sox headed into the postseason with the best record in the majors, tied with the St. Louis Cardinals.

== Postseason highlights ==
=== American League Division Series vs. Tampa Bay Rays ===
==== Game 1, October 4 ====
3:07 p.m. (EDT) at Fenway Park in Boston, Massachusetts

Team	1	2	3	4	5	6	7	8	9	R	H	E
Tampa Bay	0	1	0	1	0	0	0	0	0	2	4	0
Boston	0	0	0	5	3	0	0	4	x	12	14	0
WP: Jon Lester (1–0) LP: Matt Moore (0–1); Home runs: TB: Sean Rodriguez (1), Ben Zobrist (1); BOS: None

The Red Sox had a shaky opening in Game 1, with Jon Lester surrendering solo home runs to Sean Rodriguez and Ben Zobrist. However, the Red Sox' offense ignited in the bottom of the fourth inning, with several doubles combining with poor Tampa Bay fielding to stitch together a five-run frame. Boston then tacked on three more in the bottom of the 5th and four more in the bottom of the 8th. Jon Lester pitched 7 2/3 innings, having surrendered only 3 hits and 2 earned runs. Junichi Tazawa and Ryan Dempster provided effective relief pitching in the eighth and ninth to seal the Game 1 victory for the Red Sox.

==== Game 2, October 5 ====
5:37 p.m. (EDT) at Fenway Park in Boston, Massachusetts

Team	1	2	3	4	5	6	7	8	9	R	H	E
Tampa Bay	0	1	0	0	2	1	0	0	0	4	8	2
Boston	2	0	2	1	1	0	0	1	x	7	11	0
WP: John Lackey (1–0) LP: David Price (0–1) Sv: Koji Uehara (1); Home runs: TB: None; BOS: David Ortiz 2 (2)

David Ortiz had his first multi-home run postseason game to lead the Red Sox to victory, smashing solo blasts in the 1st and 8th innings. Tampa Bay starter David Price had a rough outing, being charged with all seven of Boston's runs. The Rays attempted to catch up with the Red Sox with significant offense in the 2nd, 5th, and 6th innings, but their efforts were fruitless. In the 7th and 8th innings, the Rays threatened with two runners on base, but in each frame no runners could score for Tampa Bay due to inning-ending 4–6–3 double plays to conserve the Sox' two-run lead, which stretched to a three-run gap with Ortiz's home run. In the top of the ninth, closer Koji Uehara struck out the first two batters he was facing and the game ended with an unassisted ground out by Mike Napoli to secure the 2–0 series lead. Throughout the game, fans at Fenway Park heckled Wil Myers, a Tampa Bay right fielder who made a critical error that had helped open up scoring for the Red Sox in Game 1.

==== Game 3, October 7 ====
6:07 p.m. (EDT) at Tropicana Field in St. Petersburg, Florida

Team	1	2	3	4	5	6	7	8	9	R	H	E
Boston	1	0	0	0	2	0	0	0	1	4	7	0
Tampa Bay	0	0	0	0	3	0	0	1	1	5	11	1
WP: Fernando Rodney (1–0) LP: Koji Uehara (0–1); Home runs: BOS: None; TB: Evan Longoria (1), José Lobatón (1)

The Red Sox jumped on the scoreboard early in Game 3, with a one-run top of the 1st inning, but Rays starter Alex Cobb kept the Rays in the game. In the top of the 5th inning, Boston added two more runs, giving them a three-run cushion, but their lead was shattered in the bottom half of the frame with one swing, a three-run home run by Evan Longoria. Neither team scored again until the bottom 8th, when Delmon Young drove in a go-ahead RBI. The Red Sox battled back in the top of the 9th inning, tying the game with runners on second and third base, and closer Koji Uehara's efforts retired two batters easily in the bottom of the 9th, until Tampa Bay catcher José Lobatón suddenly crushed a walk-off solo home run.

==== Game 4, October 8 ====
8:37 p.m. (EDT) at Tropicana Field in St. Petersburg, Florida

Team	1	2	3	4	5	6	7	8	9	R	H	E
Boston	0	0	0	0	0	0	2	0	1	3	6	0
Tampa Bay	0	0	0	0	1	0	0	0	0	1	6	0
WP: Craig Breslow (1–0) LP: Jake McGee (0–1) Sv: Koji Uehara (2)

Starter Jake Peavy pitched 5 2/3 solid innings for Boston, but the Rays got on the board first in the bottom of the fifth with a deep outfield RBI double by David DeJesus. This, however, would prove to be Tampa Bay's lone run. Boston threatened early with two walks and a single, which could not score David Ortiz from second, in the top of the second. With the bases loaded the Rays pulled their struggling starter Jeremy Hellickson, responsible for all three runners, and Jamey Wright successfully pitched out of the jam with a strike out and a double play. Tampa Bay sent a postseason record nine pitchers to the mound in the course of the game, emptying their bullpen, and scheduled game five starter David Price was warming in the pen. In the top of the seventh, with two on and two outs, Jacoby Ellsbury stole second base, his fourth steal of the series, and advanced to third on a wild pitch, which scored Xander Bogaerts from third. Shane Victorino legged out the two out infield hit to score the runner from third and gave the Red Sox the lead. In the top of the ninth, a melting Rays closer Fernando Rodney walked two of the first three batters he faced and drilled Victorino on a two strike pitch. This was the fourth time Victorino was hit by a pitch in this series. With the bases loaded Dustin Pedroia delivered a sacrifice fly which scored Bogaerts to add some insurance for Boston. Closer Koji Uehara came into the game with two outs in the bottom of the eighth and successfully racked up the four-out save. Uehara struck out Evan Longoria, who had hit a game-tying home run in Game 3, to send the Rays home and to secure a spot in the 2013 American League Championship Series

=== American League Championship Series vs. Detroit Tigers ===
==== Game 1, October 12 ====
8:00 p.m. (EDT) at Fenway Park in Boston, Massachusetts

Team	1	2	3	4	5	6	7	8	9	R	H	E
Detroit	0	0	0	0	0	1	0	0	0	1	9	0
Boston	0	0	0	0	0	0	0	0	0	0	1	1
WP: Aníbal Sánchez (1–0) LP: Jon Lester (0–1) Sv: Joaquín Benoit (1)

Boston's bats were ice cold in Game 1, nearly ceding a combined no-hitter to the Tigers. The Red Sox saved themselves from the embarrassment of being no-hit with a Daniel Nava single in the bottom of the ninth inning, but Boston failed to rally further to make up the one-run gap. Detroit had scored the game's lone run by virtue of a Jhonny Peralta RBI in the sixth inning. While Red Sox starter Jon Lester allowed only one run, he did give up nine hits and struck out six batters, whereas Detroit's Aníbal Sánchez struck out twelve. Sánchez walked six batters, but those who were fortunate enough to get on base could never stitch together any runs. Ultimately, Boston's disgruntled offense would strike out 17 times, an ALCS record.

==== Game 2, October 13 ====
8:00 p.m. (EDT) at Fenway Park in Boston, Massachusetts

Team	1	2	3	4	5	6	7	8	9	R	H	E
Detroit	0	1	0	0	0	4	0	0	0	5	8	1
Boston	0	0	0	0	0	1	0	4	1	6	7	1
WP: Koji Uehara (1–0) LP: Rick Porcello (0–1); Home runs: DET: Miguel Cabrera (1), Alex Avila (1); BOS: David Ortiz (1)

Tiger pitching again came out strong, with starter Max Scherzer holding the Red Sox hitless through five innings. At the end of the fifth inning, the Red Sox had not recorded a base hit but had held Detroit to only one run, making the game look very similar circumstantially to Game 1. However, Red Sox starter Clay Buchholz gave up home runs to Miguel Cabrera and Alex Avila in the top of the 6th, widening the Tigers' lead to five runs. The Red Sox scrounged out one run in the bottom of the 6th, a Dustin Pedroia RBI double which seemed insignificant at the time but would prove crucial later. Neither team scored in the seventh inning. In the bottom of the eighth inning, the Red Sox were able to load the bases, and David Ortiz crushed a two-out grand slam to tie the score at 5–5 off the first pitch from new Detroit pitcher Joaquín Benoit. The home run provided one of the 2013 season's most enduring images, when Tigers outfielder (and Ortiz's close friend) Torii Hunter dove over the wall into the Red Sox' bullpen in an attempt to catch the ball, resulting in his legs being completely vertical while Boston Police officer Steve Horgan lifted his arms in celebration. Following the home run, Mike Napoli struck out to stop the bleeding for the Tigers. Boston closer Koji Uehara held Detroit hitless in the top of the ninth inning. Jonny Gomes started off the Red Sox offense in the bottom of the ninth with a single. Gomes was then able to advance to second base on a flubbed fielding play. Gomes then took third base on a Rick Porcello wild pitch, and easily scored the winning run on a walk-off hit from Jarrod Saltalamacchia, capping the stunning comeback.

Earlier in the day, the New England Patriots had a comeback of their own, with quarterback Tom Brady throwing a touchdown with 5 seconds left to beat the New Orleans Saints at home by a score of 30–27. The dual-victory is still remembered as a significant moment in Boston sports history.

==== Game 3, October 15 ====
4:00 p.m. (EDT) at Comerica Park in Detroit, Michigan

Team	1	2	3	4	5	6	7	8	9	R	H	E
Boston	0	0	0	0	0	0	1	0	0	1	4	0
Detroit	0	0	0	0	0	0	0	0	0	0	6	1
WP: John Lackey (1–0) LP: Justin Verlander (0–1) Sv: Koji Uehara (1); Home runs: BOS: Mike Napoli (1); DET: None

Mike Napoli's one-out, seventh-inning solo home run was one of only four hits surrendered by Detroit starter Justin Verlander, and yet it was enough to lift the Red Sox to victory. The Tigers outhit the Red Sox, and Detroit had several prime scoring opportunities, especially in the first and eighth innings, but all were stanched by effective pitching from starter John Lackey, relievers Craig Breslow and Junichi Tazawa, and closer Koji Uehara.

Although there was still daylight present, Game 3 temporarily ceased in the middle of the second inning due to a light failure at Comerica Park which commenced at 4:42 p.m. EDT and lasted for seventeen minutes.

==== Game 4, October 16 ====
8:00 p.m. (EDT) at Comerica Park in Detroit, Michigan

Team	1	2	3	4	5	6	7	8	9	R	H	E
Boston	0	0	0	0	0	1	1	0	1	3	12	0
Detroit	0	5	0	2	0	0	0	0	x	7	9	0
WP: Doug Fister (1–0) LP: Jake Peavy (0–1)

Boston starter Jake Peavy melted early, surrendering a five-run second inning to the Tigers. Detroit added two more in the fourth inning before being relieved by Brandon Workman, and that was all the Tigers would need to coast to a 7–3 victory. Boston scratched out runs in the sixth, seventh, and ninth innings, but could never ignite an offensive rally as they did in Game 2.

With the loss, the series was guaranteed to return to Boston for Game 6 at Fenway Park on Saturday, October 19.

==== Game 5, October 17 ====
8:00 p.m. (EDT) at Comerica Park in Detroit, Michigan

Team	1	2	3	4	5	6	7	8	9	R	H	E
Boston	0	3	1	0	0	0	0	0	0	4	10	0
Detroit	0	0	0	0	1	1	1	0	0	3	10	1
WP: Jon Lester (1–1) LP: Aníbal Sánchez (1–1) Sv: Koji Uehara (2); Home runs: BOS: Mike Napoli (2); DET: None

Mike Napoli hit a 445 ft blast of a solo home-run off of Detroit's Aníbal Sánchez (who had surrendered no hits to the Red Sox in Game 1), igniting a 3-run second inning that saw David Ross and Jacoby Ellsbury also drive in runs. Boston added an important insurance run in the third, which turned out to be the difference in game five, with Mike Napoli scoring on a wild pitch by Sánchez. The Red Sox allowed Detroit to stay in the game, however, surrendering a run each in the fifth, sixth, and seventh innings. In the seventh, the Tigers scored on a double play, bringing them within a run. Craig Breslow pitched to only one batter in the bottom of the eighth inning, and then closer Koji Uehara again worked his magic to secure the win for Boston, striking out two batters and earning a five-out save.

==== Game 6, October 19 ====
8:00 p.m. (EDT) at Fenway Park in Boston, Massachusetts

Team	1	2	3	4	5	6	7	8	9	R	H	E
Detroit	0	0	0	0	0	2	0	0	0	2	8	1
Boston	0	0	0	0	1	0	4	0	x	5	5	1
WP: Junichi Tazawa (1–0) LP: Max Scherzer (0–1) Sv: Koji Uehara (3); Home runs: DET: None; BOS: Shane Victorino (1)

The Red Sox scored first, but, with the bases loaded and nobody out, the Tigers took the lead on a two-run single off the Green Monster. Reliever Brandon Workman stopped the bleeding and in the bottom of the seventh inning, Shane Victorino's one-out grand slam home run off of Detroit reliever José Veras launched the Red Sox into a 5–2 lead, which they maintained to finish off the Tigers in six games and head to the World Series against the St. Louis Cardinals, who had punched their ticket to the Fall Classic a day earlier by defeating the Dodgers. Victorino's grand slam was the second in the ALCS by the Red Sox, which was the first time that a team hit more than one grand slam in the same series in the postseason since the Atlanta Braves in the 1998 NLDS.

=== 2013 World Series vs. St. Louis Cardinals ===
==== Game 1, October 23 ====
7:30 p.m. (EDT) at Fenway Park in Boston, Massachusetts

Team	1	2	3	4	5	6	7	8	9	R	H	E
St. Louis	0	0	0	0	0	0	0	0	1	1	7	3
Boston	3	2	0	0	0	0	2	1	x	8	8	1
WP: Jon Lester (1–0) LP: Adam Wainwright (0–1); Home runs: STL: Matt Holliday (1); BOS: David Ortiz (1)

Jon Lester pitched a gem, going 7 2/3 shutout innings as the Red Sox started early with a bases clearing 3-run double by Mike Napoli in the first. They extended their to lead to 5–0 in the second, during which Carlos Beltrán robbed David Ortiz of a second postseason grand slam, injuring himself on the play. Ortiz later put an exclamation mark on the game with a 2-run shot to right in the 7th, for his 4th HR of the postseason. Matt Holliday prevented a shutout by hitting a solo shot into the Green Monster in the top of the 9th off Ryan Dempster. Dating back to 2004, the Red Sox have scored a run in the first inning for five straight games against the Cardinals in postseason play and have won nine straight World Series games.

==== Game 2, October 24 ====
7:30 p.m. (EDT) at Fenway Park in Boston, Massachusetts

Team	1	2	3	4	5	6	7	8	9	R	H	E
St. Louis	0	0	0	1	0	0	3	0	0	4	7	1
Boston	0	0	0	0	0	2	0	0	0	2	4	2
WP: Michael Wacha (1–0) LP: John Lackey (0–1) Sv: Trevor Rosenthal (1); Home runs: STL: None; BOS: David Ortiz (2)

The Red Sox suffered their first World Series loss since 1986 in that year's Game 7. Down 1–0 in the sixth inning, further long-ball theatrics were showcased by David Ortiz, who hit a two-run home run with Dustin Pedroia on base to give Boston a 2–1 lead. However, it all went to naught for the Red Sox in the seventh inning when two fielding errors on the same play gave St. Louis the lead. With the bases loaded with one out and Craig Breslow pitching in relief, Matt Carpenter hit a fly ball to left field, but the runner on third beat the throw home, tying the game. Catcher Jarrod Saltalamacchia then flubbed the ball, which was retrieved by the pitcher Breslow. Breslow then made an errant throw to third base, allowing Jon Jay to score as well, giving St. Louis a 3–2 advantage. Carlos Beltrán then singled to bring in a fourth Cardinals run. The Red Sox' subsequent comeback attempts failed, and Cardinals closer Trevor Rosenthal struck out the side in the bottom of the ninth to end the game.

==== Game 3, October 26 ====
7:30 p.m. (EDT) at Busch Stadium in St. Louis, Missouri

Team	1	2	3	4	5	6	7	8	9	R	H	E
Boston	0	0	0	0	1	1	0	2	0	4	6	2
St. Louis	2	0	0	0	0	0	2	0	1	5	12	0
WP: Trevor Rosenthal (1–0) LP: Brandon Workman (0–1)

St. Louis took early advantage of starter Jake Peavy, who gave up two runs on four hits in the first inning. After that Peavy settled in and pitched himself out of a bases loaded, nobody out situation in the fourth. Boston tied the game after a leadoff triple by rookie Xander Bogaerts who scored on a fielders choice at second by Mike Carp in the fifth and Daniel Nava drove in Shane Victorino, who reached base on a leadoff walk in the sixth and was advanced to third by a David Ortiz base hit. Félix Doubront pitched two scoreless innings and Craig Breslow took over in the seventh but was quickly replaced by Junichi Tazawa after giving up a hit and drilled Carlos Beltrán. Both inherited runners scored on a double by Matt Holliday. The Red Sox came back again in the eighth after a leadoff single by Jacoby Ellsbury and Shane Victorino was hit by reliever Carlos Martínez. Dustin Pedroia advanced the runners on a ground out, Ortiz was intentionally walked to load the bases and Cardinals closer Trevor Rosenthal took over for a 5 out save which he ended up blowing after Nava reached on a force out at second, scoring Ellsbury and a single by Bogaerts, scoring Victorino. In the bottom of the ninth with one out, Koji Uehara took the mound and gave up a double on his first pitch to Allen Craig which advanced Yadier Molina, who singled earlier in the inning, to third. On a ground ball to Pedroia, who was playing the infield grass, Molina was tagged out at home by Jarrod Saltalamacchia, who fired to third to try to get Craig. Will Middlebrooks was not able to field the ball cleanly and it got away from him. Craig stumbled over the fallen Middlebrooks and Daniel Nava, who backed up the play, quickly fired to home but third base umpire Jim Joyce called obstruction and gave Craig home plate, scoring the first obstruction walk-off win in a World Series ever.

==== Game 4, October 27 ====
8:00 p.m. (EDT) at Busch Stadium in St. Louis, Missouri

Team	1	2	3	4	5	6	7	8	9	R	H	E
Boston	0	0	0	0	1	3	0	0	0	4	6	2
St. Louis	0	0	1	0	0	0	1	0	0	2	6	0
WP: Félix Doubront (1–0) LP: Lance Lynn (0–1) Sv: Koji Uehara (1); Home runs: BOS: Jonny Gomes (1); STL: None

Like in the last two games, St. Louis scored first. Matt Carpenter singled in the third and advanced on a fielding error by Jacoby Ellsbury. Carlos Beltrán drove in the run on a base hit, unearned for starter Clay Buchholz. David Ortiz lead off the fifth on a double, followed by back-to-back walks by Jonny Gomes on 10 pitches and Xander Bogaerts. Stephen Drew scored Ortiz on a sacrifice fly. With two outs in the sixth, Dustin Pedroia singled and Ortiz drew a four pitch walk before Gomes hit a three-run shot into the Red Sox bullpen, his first hit of this World Series. Félix Doubront, who relieved Buchholz after four innings, pitched 2 2/3 innings before giving up his only hit, a double by Shane Robinson. Craig Breslow gave up a hit against Carpenter, scoring the sixth of seven inherited runners in this series by Boston relievers, and a walk to Beltrán. He was immediately relieved by Junichi Tazawa who stranded both runners. In the eighth, after his third hit on three at bats that night, Ortiz was pinched run for by Quintin Berry who stole the first Red Sox base on the very first attempt in the series against the Cardinals. John Lackey took the mound in the bottom of the eighth. With one out Yadier Molina reached base and advanced to second on a throwing error by Bogaerts and even took third on a wild pitch but St. Louis could not bring him home. In the bottom of the ninth Red Sox closer Koji Uehara took over, giving up a one out long single to Allen Craig. Uehara ended the game by picking off pinch runner Kolten Wong, earning his first save of the series and the sixth in this postseason. This was the first time a World Series game ended on a pickoff. Red Sox pitching struck out five batters, all looking.

==== Game 5, October 28 ====
7:30 p.m. (EDT) at Busch Stadium in St. Louis, Missouri

Team	1	2	3	4	5	6	7	8	9	R	H	E
Boston	1	0	0	0	0	0	2	0	0	3	9	0
St. Louis	0	0	0	1	0	0	0	0	0	1	4	0
WP: Jon Lester (2–0) LP: Adam Wainwright (0–2) Sv: Koji Uehara (2); Home runs: BOS: None; STL: Matt Holliday (2)

Game 5 saw a battle of the aces with Adam Wainwright on the short end as Lester pitched another gem of 7 2/3 innings. Boston struck first on back-to-back one out doubles by Dustin Pedroia and David Ortiz, who continued his monstrous tear, hitting .733 in the series. Wainwright ended up striking out the side in the first two innings before Jon Lester broke the streak with a groundout. St. Louis had back-to-back leadoff singles in the second and third by Carlos Beltrán and David Freese, latter advanced to second on a sacrifice bunt by Pete Kozma but was left in scoring position. In the fourth Ortiz tied a World Series record by Billy Hatcher on a hit, reaching base in nine consecutive plate appearances, but failed to set a new record by flying out to center field in the sixth. With one out in the bottom of the fourth, Matt Holliday hit a solo shot to center field to tie the game. Boston threatened in the fifth after a leadoff hit by Xander Bogaerts and a one out single by David Ross but Wainwright struck out Lester and Ellsbury to strand both runners. After a leadoff single by Bogaerts, Stephen Drew walked and Ross drove in one run on a ground rule double to left field. With two runners in scoring position Ellsbury's single scored Drew but Ross was tagged out at home plate on the throw by Shane Robinson. In the bottom of the eighth Lester allowed a one out double against Freese and Koji Uehara took over the mound for a four out save after Kozma hit a fly ball to left field for the second out of the inning. Uehara struck out pinch hitter Matt Adams on three pitches for the third out. The Red Sox closer struck out Matt Carpenter, grounded out pinch hinter Jon Jay and Holliday flew out to right field to earn the save in back-to-back games. This was the first game of this series neither team committed an error.

==== Game 6, October 30 ====
7:30 p.m. (EDT) at Fenway Park in Boston, Massachusetts

Team	1	2	3	4	5	6	7	8	9	R	H	E
St. Louis	0	0	0	0	0	0	1	0	0	1	9	1
Boston	0	0	3	3	0	0	0	0	x	6	8	1
WP: John Lackey (1–1) LP: Michael Wacha (1–1); Home runs: STL: None; BOS: Stephen Drew (1)

St. Louis threatened first with back-to-back hits in the second by Allen Craig, who hit a wallball leadoff single, and Yadier Molina with another single to left field. John Lackey induced two flyouts against Matt Adams and David Freese, before the runners advanced on a wild pitch, but Lackey ended the threat by striking out Jon Jay. In the same inning the first two batters for the Red Sox reached base, a single by Jonny Gomes and a walk by Shane Victorino, but after back-to-back popouts into foul territory by Xander Bogaerts and Stephen Drew, David Ross struck out. Jacoby Ellsbury lead off the third inning with a single and Pedroia advanced him to second on a groundout. With first base open, Michael Wacha intentionally walked David Ortiz, Ortiz's second walk of the game, and struck out Mike Napoli but then drilled Gomes and with the bases loaded Victorino hit a double off the Green Monster, his first hit in this series, scoring all three runners. Victorino just missed his second grand slam of this postseason but Wacha's streak ended, who to this point had not allowed a hit with runners in scoring position this October. Bogaerts lined out to third base to end the inning. In the top of the fourth, the just awarded AL Golden Glove winner on second base, Dustin Pedroia, committed a fielding error on a possible double play ball with one out and Craig on first. Lackey pitched out of the jam on a flyout by Adams and striking out Freese. On the first pitch in the bottom of the fourth, Drew homered into the Red Sox bullpen and Ellsbury followed him with a double. After a flyout by Pedroia which advanced Ellsbury to third, Ortiz was again intentionally walked. Cardinals manager Mike Matheny tried to stop the bleeding and replaced his rookie starter with game 4 losing pitcher Lance Lynn, who quickly warmed up after Drew went yard earlier in this inning. Lynn could not make an out as Napoli drove in Ellsbury on a single, Gomes drew a walk to load the bases and Victorino collected his fourth RBI on a base hit which scored Ortiz from third. Seth Maness relieved Lynn and ended the inning by striking out Bogaerts. Michael Wacha left the game with six earned runs in 3 2/3 innings of work. Prior to this game he posted a 1.00 ERA in the postseason. The Cardinals threatened again in the fifth after a leadoff hit by John Jay, a one out single by Carpenter and a flyout to right field by Carlos Beltrán, which advanced Jay to third. But Lackey induced another flyout against Matt Holliday. St. Louis brought in their fourth arm of the night in the bottom of the fifth, Kevin Siegrist. After two quick outs, Ellsbury reached on a fielding error by Matt Carpenter and was then in a rundown, after he took off too early on a steal attempt. Siegrist misplayed his position on first base, standing too far away, and Ellsbury safely returned to the bag. Lackey got two quick outs in the top of the seventh, before Daniel Descalso hit a long single into right field and Carpenter followed him with a double to left field, advancing the runner to third. Beltrán drove in the Cardinal's first run on a left field single into the shift and advanced on a wild pitch. Lackey walked Holliday to load the bases before he was relieved by Junichi Tazawa. He induced a ground ball against Allen Craig to first base, Mike Napoli bobbled the ball but could recover in time and Tazawa, covering first base, got the out. With Ellsbury on first, Pedroia grounded into a fielder's choice in the bottom of the eighth, which ended his streak of reaching base safely in 20 consecutive postseason games at home. In a non-save situation, the Red Sox brought in their closer Koji Uehara, in relief of Brandon Workman, who worked a quiet eighth inning. John Jay flew out to Gomes, Descalso popped out to Gomes and Carpenter struck out and the Red Sox clinched their eighth World Series.

John Lackey became the first pitcher in MLB history to win two World Series clinching games with two different teams. Lackey won the series clincher with the Los Angeles Angels in 2002 as a rookie. David Ortiz was named World Series MVP for the first time in his career with two home runs, six RBIs, a .688 batting average and a 1.948 OPS. He became the first non-Yankee to win three rings with one team since Jim Palmer did it for the 1966, 1970, and 1983 Baltimore Orioles.

This was the first World Series championship clinched at Fenway Park by the Boston Red Sox since the 1918 edition. The Red Sox had won their 2004 and 2007 titles on the road in four-game sweeps. Thes was the first time a World Series was won at Fenway since the 1975 Game 7 victory by the Cincinnati Reds. The Red Sox became the first MLB team to win three championships in the 2000s; they were joined by the San Francisco Giants a year later, and Boston became the first team with four championships in the 2000s with their 2018 title.

== 2013 roster ==
2013 Boston Red Sox
Roster
Pitchers: 91 Alfredo Aceves; 40 Andrew Bailey; 51 Daniel Bard; 54 Pedro Beato; 32 Craig Breslow; 66 Drake Britton; 11 Clay Buchholz; 62 Rubby De La Rosa; 65 Jose De La Torre; 46 Ryan Dempster; 22 Félix Doubront; 52 Joel Hanrahan; 41 John Lackey; 31 Jon Lester; 30 Andrew Miller; 56 Franklin Morales; 59 Clayton Mortensen; 44 Jake Peavy; 36 Junichi Tazawa; 38 Matt Thornton; 19 Koji Uehara; 60 Brayan Villarreal; 64 Allen Webster; 63 Alex Wilson; 67 Brandon Workman; 35 Steven Wright	Catchers: 3 David Ross; 20 Ryan Lavarnway; 39 Jarrod Saltalamacchia; Infielders: 72 Xander Bogaerts; 23 Pedro Ciriaco; 76 Jonathan Diaz; 7 Stephen Drew; 26 Brock Holt; 10 José Iglesias; 10 John McDonald; 16 Will Middlebrooks; 12 Mike Napoli; 34 David Ortiz; 15 Dustin Pedroia; 23 Brandon Snyder	Outfielders: 50 Quintin Berry; 44,25 Jackie Bradley Jr.; 37 Mike Carp; 2 Jacoby Ellsbury; 5 Jonny Gomes; 29 Daniel Nava; 18 Shane Victorino	Manager: 53 John Farrell; Coaches: 86 Brian Abraham (bullpen catcher); 43 Arnie Beyeler (first base); 13 Brian Butterfield (third base); 28 Greg Colbrunn (hitting); 85 Ino Guerrero (BP Pitcher-Coach); 58 Dana LeVangie (bullpen); 17 Torey Lovullo (bench); 88 Alex Martinez (Bullpen Catcher); 47 Juan Nieves (pitching); 57 Vic Rodriguez (assistant hitting)

== Beards ==
Throughout the regular season, numerous Red Sox players sported considerable facial hair, which drew media attention and later drove team marketing. The trend began during spring training, when outfielder Jonny Gomes arrived considerably unshaven. This caught the eye of first baseman Mike Napoli and catcher David Ross, who decided to also stop shaving. With time, other players joined, including second baseman Dustin Pedroia; designated hitter David Ortiz; outfielders Mike Carp and Shane Victorino; pitchers Brandon Workman, Ryan Dempster, John Lackey, and Clay Buchholz; and catcher Jarrod Saltalamacchia. Other players joined from time to time.

The trend grabbed the attention of the audience, who started wearing real and fake beards to the stadium in support of the team. Team marketing started campaigns to take advantage of the beards' popularity. They even gave nicknames to each player's beards such as "The Ironsides" (Gomes), "The Siesta" (Napoli), or "The Saltine" (Saltalamacchia). Steve Rushin wrote an article and interview for Sports Illustrated, "The Hirsute of Happiness", exploring how the beard trend had helped unite the team. The team has also developed the custom of tugging each other's beards to celebrate a hit or home run.

After the team won the World Series, some of the players decided to shave their beards. Victorino and Ortiz shaved theirs during a charity event sponsored by Gillette. At the event, the Boston company donated $100,000 to One Fund Boston, a charity dedicated to the victims of the April 2013 Boston Marathon bombing.

== Game log ==
Red Sox Win	Red Sox Loss	Game postponed	Clinched Playoff Spot	Clinched Division
Boldface text denotes a Red Sox pitcher

Boston Red Sox 2013 Season Game Log — Season Record: (97–65), 1st in AL East
April (18–8)

#	Date	Opponent	Score	Win	Loss	Save	Stadium	Attendance	Record	Box/ Streak
1	April 1	@ Yankees	8–2	**Lester** (1–0)	Sabathia (0–1)		Yankee Stadium	49,514	1–0	W1
2	April 3	@ Yankees	7–4	**Buchholz** (1–0)	Kuroda (0–1)	**Hanrahan** (1)	Yankee Stadium	40,216	2–0	W2
3	April 4	@ Yankees	2–4	Pettitte (1–0)	**Dempster** (0–1)	Rivera (1)	Yankee Stadium	40,611	2–1	L1
4	April 5	@ Blue Jays	6–4	**Tazawa** (1–0)	Johnson (0–1)	**Hanrahan** (2)	Rogers Centre	45,328	3–1	W1
5	April 6	@ Blue Jays	0–5	Happ (1–0)	**Lackey** (0–1)		Rogers Centre	45,797	3–2	L1
6	April 7	@ Blue Jays	13–0	**Lester** (2–0)	Dickey (0–2)		Rogers Centre	41,168	4–2	W1
7	April 8	Orioles	3–1	**Buchholz** (2–0)	Chen (0–1)	**Hanrahan** (3)	**Fenway Park**	37,008	5–2	W2
8	April 10	Orioles	5–8	O'Day (1–0)	**Hanrahan** (0–1)	Johnson (3)	**Fenway Park**	30,862*	5–3	L1
9	April 11	Orioles	2–3	Matusz (1–0)	**Mortensen** (0–1)	Johnson (4)	**Fenway Park**	27,704	5–4	L2
–	April 12	Rays	**Postponed (rain)** (Makeup date: June 18)							
10	April 13	Rays	2–1 (10)	**Tazawa** (2–0)	Gomes (0–1)		**Fenway Park**	33,039	6–4	W1
11	April 14	Rays	5–0	**Buchholz** (3–0)	Cobb (1–1)		**Fenway Park**	35,198	7–4	W2
12	April 15	Rays	3–2	**Bailey** (1–0)	Peralta (0–1)		**Fenway Park**	37,449	8–4	W3
13	April 16	@ Indians	7–2	**Doubront** (1–0)	Jiménez (0–2)		Progressive Field	9,143	9–4	W4
14	April 17	@ Indians	6–3	**Aceves** (1–0)	Masterson (3–1)	**Bailey** (1)	Progressive Field	10,282	10–4	W5
15	April 18	@ Indians	6–3	**Lester** (3–0)	McAllister (1–2)	**Bailey** (2)	Progressive Field	12,936	11–4	W6
–	April 19	Royals	**Postponed (lockdown in Boston due to manhunt for Boston Marathon bombing suspect)** (Makeup date: doubleheader April 21)							
16	April 20	Royals	4–3	**Buchholz** (4–0)	Herrera (1–2)	**Bailey** (3)	**Fenway Park**	35,152	12–4	W7
17	April 21^	Royals	2–4	Santana (2–1)	**Dempster** (0–2)	Holland (4)	**Fenway Park**	31,483	12–5	L1
18	April 21^	Royals	4–5 (10)	Herrera (2–2)	**Miller** (0–1)	Holland (5)	**Fenway Park**	33,270	12–6	L2
19	April 22	Athletics	9–6	**Doubront** (2–0)	Griffin (2–1)	**Bailey** (4)	**Fenway Park**	28,926	13–6	W1
20	April 23	Athletics	0–13 (7) (rain)	Colon (3–0)	**Aceves** (1–1)		**Fenway Park**	29,006	13–7	L1
21	April 24	Athletics	6–5	**Lester** (4–0)	Anderson (1–4)	**Bailey** (5)	**Fenway Park**	29,274	14–7	W1
22	April 25	Astros	7–2	**Buchholz** (5–0)	Humber (0–5)		**Fenway Park**	30,093	15–7	W2
23	April 26	Astros	7–3	**Dempster** (1–2)	Bédard (0–2)		**Fenway Park**	29,312	16–7	W3
24	April 27	Astros	8–4	**Doubront** (3–0)	Peacock (1–3)		**Fenway Park**	34,726	17–7	W4
25	April 28	Astros	6–1	**Lackey** (1–1)	Norris (3–3)		**Fenway Park**	36,527	18–7	W5
26	April 30	@ Blue Jays	7–9	Delabar (2–1)	**Tazawa** (2–1)	Janssen (7)	Rogers Centre	22,915	18–8	L1
*This attendance figure marked the official end of the Red Sox' sellout streak extending back to May 15, 2003.^Day–night doubleheader

May (15–15)

#	Date	Opponent	Score	Win	Loss	Save	Stadium	Attendance	Record	Box/ Streak
27	May 1	@ Blue Jays	10–1	**Buchholz** (6–0)	Buehrle (1–2)		Rogers Centre	21,094	19–8	W1
28	May 2	@ Blue Jays	3–1	**Dempster** (2–2)	Happ (2–2)	**Hanrahan** (4)	Rogers Centre	25,851	20–8	W2
29	May 3	@ Rangers	0–7	Holland (2–2)	**Doubront** (3–1)		Rangers Ballpark	42,441	20–9	L1
30	May 4	@ Rangers	1–5	Ogando (3–2)	**Lackey** (1–2)		Rangers Ballpark	47,173	20–10	L2
31	May 5	@ Rangers	3–4	Nathan (1–0)	**Mortensen** (0–2)		Rangers Ballpark	46,228	20–11	L3
32	May 6	Twins	6–5	**Mortensen** (1–2)	Burton (0–1)		**Fenway Park**	31,088	21–11	W1
33	May 7	Twins	1–6	Diamond (3–2)	**Dempster** (2–3)		**Fenway Park**	30,549	21–12	L1
34	May 8	Twins	8–15	Pressly (1–0)	**Webster** (0–1)		**Fenway Park**	29,969	21–13	L2
35	May 9	Twins	3–5	Correia (4–2)	**Lackey** (1–3)	Perkins (8)	**Fenway Park**	31,571	21–14	L3
36	May 10	Blue Jays	5–0	**Lester** (5–0)	Ortiz (0–1)		**Fenway Park**	33,606	22–14	W1
37	May 11	Blue Jays	2–3	Oliver (2–1)	**Tazawa** (2–2)	Janssen (10)	**Fenway Park**	36,543	22–15	L1
38	May 12	Blue Jays	4–12	Jenkins (1–0)	**Dempster** (2–4)		**Fenway Park**	35,532	22–16	L2
39	May 14	@ Rays	3–5	Moore (7–0)	**Lackey** (1–4)	Rodney (7)	Tropicana Field	15,227	22–17	L3
40	May 15	@ Rays	9–2	**Lester** (6–0)	Price (1–4)		Tropicana Field	15,767	23–17	W1
41	May 16	@ Rays	4–3	**Tazawa** (3–2)	Rodney (1–2)		Tropicana Field	16,055	24–17	W2
42	May 17	@ Twins	3–2	**Wilson** (1–0)	Roenicke (1–1)	**Uehara** (1)	Target Field	30,210	25–17	W3
43	May 18	@ Twins	12–5	**Breslow** (1–0)	Diamond (3–4)		Target Field	36,967	26–17	W4
44	May 19	@ Twins	5–1	**Lackey** (2–4)	Hernández (2–1)		Target Field	33,042	27–17	W5
45	May 20	@ White Sox	4–6	Axelrod (2–3)	**Lester** (6–1)	Reed (15)	U.S. Cellular Field	21,816	27–18	L1
46	May 21	@ White Sox	1–3	Quintana (3–1)	**Doubront** (3–2)	Reed (16)	U.S. Cellular Field	21,984	27–19	L2
47	May 22	@ White Sox	6–2	**Buchholz** (7–0)	Santiago (1–3)		U.S. Cellular Field	21,298	28–19	W1
48	May 23	Indians	3–12	McAllister (4–3)	**Dempster** (2–5)	Barnes (1)	**Fenway Park**	35,254	28–20	L1
49	May 24	Indians	8–1	**Lackey** (3–4)	Masterson (7–3)		**Fenway Park**	34,074	29–20	W1
50	May 25	Indians	7–4	**Tazawa** (4–2)	Pestano (1–1)	**Bailey** (6)	**Fenway Park**	36,504	30–20	W2
51	May 26	Indians	6–5	**Breslow** (2–0)	Perez (2–1)		**Fenway Park**	37,046	31–20	W3
52	May 27	Phillies	9–3	**Aceves** (2–1)	Cloyd (1–1)		**Fenway Park**	33,627	32–20	W4
53	May 28	Phillies	1–3	Lee (6–2)	**Dempster** (2–6)	Papelbon (10)	**Fenway Park**	33,463	32–21	L1
54	May 29	@ Phillies	3–4	Kendrick (5–3)	**Lackey** (3–5)	Papelbon (11)	Citizens Bank Park	38,831	32–22	L2
55	May 30	@ Phillies	9–2	**Morales** (1–0)	Pettibone (3–1)		Citizens Bank Park	40,083	33–22	W1
56	May 31	@ Yankees	1–4	Sabathia (5–4)	**Lester** (6–2)	Rivera (19)	Yankee Stadium	45,141	33–23	L1

June (17–11)

#	Date	Opponent	Score	Win	Loss	Save	Stadium	Attendance	Record	Box/ Streak
57	June 1	@ Yankees	11–1	**Doubront** (4–2)	Hughes (2–4)		Yankee Stadium	48,784	34–23	W1
58	June 2	@ Yankees	3–0 (6) (rain)	**Buchholz** (8–0)	Kuroda (6–4)		Yankee Stadium	43,613	35–23	W2
59	June 4	Rangers	17–5	**Dempster** (3–6)	Grimm (5–4)		**Fenway Park**	32,035	36–23	W3
60	June 5	Rangers	2–3	Cotts (1–0)	**Breslow** (2–1)	Nathan (18)	**Fenway Park**	33,296	36–24	L1
61	June 6	Rangers	6–3	**Bailey** (2–0)	Kirman (0–2)		**Fenway Park**	35,352	37–24	W1
–	June 7	Angels	Postponed due to Tropical Storm Andrea. Made up on June 8 as part of a doubleheader							
62	June 8*	Angels	5–9	Hanson (3–2)	**Doubront** (4–3)	Frieri (14)	**Fenway Park**	34,499	37–25	L1
63	June 8*	Angels	7–2	**Buchholz** (9–0)	Wilson (4–5)		**Fenway Park**	36,518	38–25	W1
64	June 9	Angels	10–5	**Dempster** (4–6)	Blanton (1–10)		**Fenway Park**	37,054	39–25	W2
65	June 10	@ Rays	10–8 (14)	**Morales** (2–0)	Ramos (1–2)		Tropicana Field	15,477	40–25	W3
66	June 11	@ Rays	3–8	Hernández (4–6)	**Lester** (6–3)		Tropicana Field	16,870	40–26	L1
67	June 12	@ Rays	2–1	**Aceves** (3–1)	Archer (1–2)	**Bailey** (7)	Tropicana Field	15,091	41–26	W1
68	June 13	@ Orioles	4–5 (13)	McFarland (1–0)	**Wilson** (1–1)		Camden Yards	20,098	41–27	L1
69	June 14	@ Orioles	0–2	Tillman (7–2)	**Dempster** (4–7)	Johnson (24)	Camden Yards	39,158	41–28	L2
70	June 15	@ Orioles	5–4	**Lackey** (4–5)	García (3–4)	**Bailey** (8)	Camden Yards	42,422	42–28	W1
71	June 16	@ Orioles	3–6	Gonzalez (5–2)	**Lester** (6–4)	Johnson (25)	Camden Yards	41,311	42–29	L1
72	June 18*	Rays	5–1	**Aceves** (4–1)	Archer (1–3)		**Fenway Park**	33,430	43–29	W1
73	June 18*	Rays	3–1	**Bailey** (3–0)	Peralta (1–3)		**Fenway Park**	32,156	44–29	W2
74	June 19	Rays	2–6	Hellickson (5–3)	**Dempster** (4–8)		**Fenway Park**	35,710	44–30	L1
75	June 20	@ Tigers	3–4	Smyly (3–0)	**Bailey** (3–1)		Comerica Park	36,939	44–31	L2
76	June 21	@ Tigers	10–6	**Lester** (7–4)	Fister (6–5)		Comerica Park	41,126	45–31	W1
77	June 22	@ Tigers	3–10	Scherzer (11–0)	**Webster** (0–2)		Comerica Park	42,508	45–32	L1
78	June 23	@ Tigers	5–7	Benoit (2–0)	**Miller** (0–2)		Comerica Park	41,507	45–33	L2
79	June 25	Rockies	11–4	**Dempster** (5–8)	Nicasio (4–4)		**Fenway Park**	36,286	46–33	W1
80	June 26	Rockies	5–3	**Lackey** (5–5)	Oswalt (0–2)	**Uehara** (2)	**Fenway Park**	34,632	47–33	W2
81	June 27	Blue Jays	7–4	**Lester** (8–4)	Wang (1–1)	**Uehara** (3)	**Fenway Park**	34,750	48–33	W3
82	June 28	Blue Jays	7–5	**Miller** (1–2)	Wagner (1–2)	**Uehara** (4)	**Fenway Park**	36,383	49–33	W4
83	June 29	Blue Jays	2–6	Delabar (5–1)	**Tazawa** (4–3)		**Fenway Park**	37,437	49–34	L1
84	June 30	Blue Jays	5–4	**Uehara** (1–0)	Pérez (1–1)		**Fenway Park**	37,425	50–34	W1
*Day–night doubleheaders

July (15–10)

#	Date	Opponent	Score	Win	Loss	Save	Stadium	Attendance	Record	Box/ Streak
85	July 2	Padres	4–1	**Lackey** (6–5)	Erlin (1–1)	**Uehara** (5)	**Fenway Park**	36,498	51–34	W2
86	July 3	Padres	2–1	**Uehara** (2–0)	Gregerson (4–4)		**Fenway Park**	36,911	52–34	W3
87	July 4	Padres	8–2	**Webster** (1–2)	Stults (6–7)		**Fenway Park**	37,607	53–34	W4
88	July 5	@ Angels	6–2	**Doubront** (5–3)	Wilson (8–6)		Angel Stadium of Anaheim	37,902	54–34	W5
89	July 6	@ Angels	7–9 (11)	De La Rosa (4–1)	**Breslow** (2–2)		Angel Stadium of Anaheim	36,112	54–35	L1
90	July 7	@ Angels	0–3	Weaver (3–4)	**Lackey** (6–6)	Frieri (22)	Angel Stadium of Anaheim	39,018	54–36	L2
91	July 8	@ Mariners	4–11	Hernández (9–4)	**Lester** (8–5)		Safeco Field	21,830	54–37	L3
92	July 9	@ Mariners	11–8	**Breslow** (3–2)	Beavan (0–2)	**Uehara** (6)	Safeco Field	21,072	55–37	W1
93	July 10	@ Mariners	11–4	**Doubront** (6–3)	Harang (4–8)		Safeco Field	20,480	56–37	W2
94	July 11	@ Mariners	8–7 (10)	**Wright** (1–0)	Wilhelmsen (0–3)	**Uehara** (7)	Safeco Field	25,367	57–37	W3
95	July 12	@ Athletics	4–2	**Lackey** (7–6)	Doolittle (3–3)	**Uehara** (8)	O.co Coliseum	27,084	58–37	W4
96	July 13	@ Athletics	0–3	Griffin (8–6)	**Lester** (8–6)	Balfour (25)	O.co Coliseum	36,067	58–38	L1
97	July 14	@ Athletics	2–3 (11)	Cook (2–2)	**Thornton** (0–4)		O.co Coliseum	31,417	58–39	L2
ASG	July 16	All-Star Game	AL 3–0 NL	Sale AL, (CWS)	Corbin NL, (ARI)	Nathan AL, (TEX)	Citi Field	45,186		Box
98	July 19	Yankees	4–2	**Doubront** (7–3)	Pettitte (7–7)	**Uehara** (9)	**Fenway Park**	38,130	59–39	W1
99	July 20	Yankees	2–5	Kuroda (9–6)	**Lackey** (7–7)	Rivera (31)	**Fenway Park**	37,601	59–40	L1
100	July 21	Yankees	8–7 (11)	**Beato** (1–0)	Warren (1–1)		**Fenway Park**	38,138	60–40	W1
101	July 22	Rays	0–3	Moore (14–3)	**Workman** (0–1)		**Fenway Park**	35,016	60–41	L1
102	July 23	Rays	6–2	**Lester** (9–6)	Hernández (5–11)		**Fenway Park**	34,609	61–41	W1
103	July 24	Rays	1–5	Price (5–5)	**Doubront** (7–4)		**Fenway Park**	36,514	61–42	L1
–	July 25	Rays	**Postponed (rain)** (Makeup date: July 29)							
104	July 26	@ Orioles	0–6	Tillman (13–3)	**Lackey** (7–8)		Camden Yards	39,063	61–43	L2
105	July 27	@ Orioles	7–3	**Dempster** (6–8)	Feldman (9–8)		Camden Yards	44,765	62–43	W1
106	July 28	@ Orioles	5–0	**Lester** (10–6)	Hammel (7–8)		Camden Yards	32,891	63–43	W2
107	July 29	Rays	1–2	Price (6–5)	**Doubront** (7–5)	Rodney (26)	**Fenway Park**	37,242	63–44	L1
108	July 30	Mariners	8–2	**Workman** (1–1)	Saunders (9–10)		**Fenway Park**	34,578	64–44	W1
109	July 31	Mariners	5–4 (15)	**Britton** (1–0)	Luetge (0–2)		**Fenway Park**	35,059	65–44	W2

August (16–12)

#	Date	Opponent	Score	Win	Loss	Save	Stadium	Attendance	Record	Box/ Streak
110	August 1	Mariners	8–7	**Wright** (2–0)	Pérez (2–3)		**Fenway Park**	35,886	66–44	W3
111	August 2	Diamondbacks	6–7	Delgado (4–3)	**Beato** (1–1)	Ziegler (6)	**Fenway Park**	37,652	66–45	L1
112	August 3	Diamondbacks	5–2	**Peavy** (9–4)	Corbin (12–3)	**Uehara** (10)	**Fenway Park**	37,941	67–45	W1
113	August 4	Diamondbacks	4–0	**Doubront** (8–5)	McCarthy (2–5)		**Fenway Park**	37,611	68–45	W2
114	August 5	@ Astros	0–2	Oberholtzer (2–0)	**Lackey** (7–9)	Fields (1)	Minute Maid Park	24,543	68–46	L1
115	August 6	@ Astros	15–10	**Workman** (2–1)	Lyles (4–6)		Minute Maid Park	21,620	69–46	W1
116	August 7	@ Astros	7–5	**Tazawa** (5–3)	Fields (1–2)	**Uehara** (11)	Minute Maid Park	22,205	70–46	W2
117	August 8	@ Royals	1–5	Chen (5–0)	**Lester** (10–7)	Hochevar (2)	Kauffman Stadium	21,121	70–47	L1
118	August 9	@ Royals	6–9	Bueno (1–0)	**Britton** (1–1)	Holland (31)	Kauffman Stadium	29,485	70–48	L2
119	August 10	@ Royals	5–3	**Workman** (3–1)	Guthrie (12–8)	**Uehara** (12)	Kauffman Stadium	38,742	71–48	W1
120	August 11	@ Royals	3–4	Shields (7–8)	**Lackey** (7–10)	Holland (32)	Kauffman Stadium	24,935	71–49	L1
121	August 13	@ Blue Jays	4–2 (11)	**Uehara** (3–0)	Loup (4–5)		Rogers Centre	32,816	72–49	W1
122	August 14	@ Blue Jays	3–4 (10)	Lincoln (1–1)	**Workman** (3–2)		Rogers Centre	31,695	72–50	L1
123	August 15	@ Blue Jays	1–2	Buehrle (9–7)	**Peavy** (9–5)	Janssen (22)	Rogers Centre	40,477	72–51	L2
124	August 16	Yankees	3–10	Pettitte (8–9)	**Doubront** (8–6)		**Fenway Park**	38,143	72–52	L3
125	August 17	Yankees	6–1	**Lackey** (8–10)	Kuroda (11–8)		**Fenway Park**	37,517	73–52	W1
126	August 18	Yankees	6–9	Sabathia (11–10)	**Dempster** (6–9)	Rivera (36)	**Fenway Park**	37,917	73–53	L1
127	August 19	@ Giants	7–0	**Lester** (11–7)	Lincecum (6–13)		AT&T Park	41,585	74–53	W1
128	August 20	@ Giants	2–3	Romo (4–6)	**Morales** (2–1)		AT&T Park	41,551	74–54	L1
129	August 21	@ Giants	12–1	**Doubront** (9–6)	Zito (4–9)		AT&T Park	41,532	75–54	W1
130	August 23	@ Dodgers	0–2	Nolasco (10–9)	**Lackey** (8–11)	Jansen (22)	Dodger Stadium	50,240	75–55	L1
131	August 24	@ Dodgers	4–2	**Lester** (12–7)	Ryu (12–5)	**Uehara** (13)	Dodger Stadium	48,165	76–55	W1
132	August 25	@ Dodgers	8–1	**Peavy** (10–5)	Capuano (4–7)		Dodger Stadium	44,107	77–55	W2
133	August 27	Orioles	13–2	**Doubront** (10–6)	Chen (7–7)		**Fenway Park**	36,226	78–55	W3
134	August 28	Orioles	4–3	**Breslow** (4–2)	Hunter (3–3)	**Uehara** (14)	**Fenway Park**	31,962	79–55	W4
135	August 29	Orioles	2–3	Tillman (15–4)	**Lester** (12–8)	Johnson (41)	**Fenway Park**	33,300	79–56	L1
136	August 30	White Sox	4–3	**Dempster** (7–9)	Santiago (4–8)	**Uehara** (15)	**Fenway Park**	36,063	80–56	W1
137	August 31	White Sox	7–2	**Peavy** (11–5)	Danks (4–11)		**Fenway Park**	37,363	81–56	W2

September (16–9)

#	Date	Opponent	Score	Win	Loss	Save	Stadium	Attendance	Record	Box/ Streak
138	September 1	White Sox	7–6	**Workman** (4–2)	Rienzo (1–1)	**Uehara** (16)	**Fenway Park**	37,053	82–56	W3
139	September 2	Tigers	0–3	Fister (12–7)	**Lackey** (8–12)	Veras (21)	**Fenway Park**	36,188	82–57	L1
140	September 3	Tigers	2–1	**Lester** (13–8)	Scherzer (19–2)	**Uehara** (17)	**Fenway Park**	32,071	83–57	W1
141	September 4	Tigers	20–4	**Dempster** (8–9)	Porcello (11–8)		**Fenway Park**	33,720	84–57	W2
142	September 5	@ Yankees	9–8 (10)	**Breslow** (5–2)	Chamberlain (2–1)	**Uehara** (18)	Yankee Stadium	40,481	85–57	W3
143	September 6	@ Yankees	12–8	**Workman** (5–2)	Claiborne (0–2)		Yankee Stadium	44,117	86–57	W4
144	September 7	@ Yankees	13–9	**Lackey** (9–12)	Huff (2–1)		Yankee Stadium	49,046	87–57	W5
145	September 8	@ Yankees	3–4	Rivera (5–2)	**Workman** (5–3)		Yankee Stadium	43,078	87–58	L1
146	September 10	@ Rays	2–0	**Buchholz** (10–0)	Price (8–8)	**Uehara** (19)	Tropicana Field	18,605	88–58	W1
147	September 11	@ Rays	7–3 (10)	**Uehara** (4–0)	Peralta (2–7)		Tropicana Field	19,215	89–58	W2
148	September 12	@ Rays	3–4	McGee (5–3)	**De La Rosa** (0–1)	Rodney (34)	Tropicana Field	20,360	89–59	L1
149	September 13	Yankees	8–4	**Workman** (6–3)	Kuroda (11–11)		**Fenway Park**	37,542	90–59	W1
150	September 14	Yankees	5–1	**Lester** (14–8)	Sabathia (13–13)		**Fenway Park**	37,510	91–59	W2
151	September 15	Yankees	9–2	**Buchholz** (11–0)	Nova (8–5)		**Fenway Park**	37,530	92–59	W3
152	September 17	Orioles	2–3	Hunter (6–4)	**Uehara** (4–1)	Johnson (46)	**Fenway Park**	35,030	92–60	L1
153	September 18	Orioles	3–5 (12)	McFarland (2–1)	**Morales** (2–2)	Johnson (47)	**Fenway Park**	38,540	92–61	L2
154	September 19	Orioles	3–1	**Lackey** (10–12)	Tillman (16–7)		**Fenway Park**	36,436	93–61	W1
155	September 20	Blue Jays	6–3	**Lester** (15–8)	Rogers (5–8)	**Uehara** (20)	**Fenway Park**	37,215	94–61	W2
156	September 21	Blue Jays	2–4	Buehrle (12–9)	**Buchholz** (11–1)	Janssen (33)	**Fenway Park**	37,569	94–62	L1
157	September 22	Blue Jays	5–2	**Doubront** (11–6)	Dickey (13–13)	**Uehara** (21)	**Fenway Park**	37,020	95–62	W1
158	September 24	@ Rockies	3–8	Chatwood (8–5)	**Lackey** (10–13)		Coors Field	32,315	95–63	L1
159	September 25	@ Rockies	15–5	**Peavy** (12–5)	Chacin (14–10)		Coors Field	48,775	96–63	W1
160	September 27	@ Orioles	12–3	**Buchholz** (12–1)	Feldman (12–12)		Camden Yards	30,774	97–63	W2
161	September 28	@ Orioles	5–6	Gausman (3–5)	**Tazawa** (5–4)	Johnson (49)	Camden Yards	36,556	97–64	L1
162	September 29	@ Orioles	6–7	McFarland (4–1)	**De La Rosa** (0–2)	Johnson (50)	Camden Yards	44,230	97–65	L2

== Player stats ==
=== Batting ===
Note: G = Games played; AB = At bats; R = Runs; H = Hits; 2B = Doubles; 3B = Triples; HR = Home runs; RBI = Runs batted in; SB = Stolen bases; BB = Walks; AVG = Batting average; SLG = Slugging average

Player	G	AB	R	H	2B	3B	HR	RBI	SB	BB	AVG	SLG
Dustin Pedroia	160	641	91	193	42	2	9	84	17	73	.301	.415
Jacoby Ellsbury	134	577	92	172	31	8	9	53	52	47	.298	.426
David Ortiz	137	518	84	160	38	2	30	103	4	76	.309	.564
Mike Napoli	139	498	79	129	38	2	23	92	1	73	.259	.482
Shane Victorino	122	477	82	140	26	2	15	61	21	25	.294	.451
Daniel Nava	134	458	77	139	29	0	12	66	0	51	.303	.445
Stephen Drew	124	442	57	112	29	8	13	67	6	54	.253	.443
Jarrod Saltalamacchia	121	425	68	116	40	0	14	65	4	43	.273	.466
Will Middlebrooks	94	348	41	79	18	0	17	49	3	20	.227	.425
Jonny Gomes	116	312	49	77	17	0	13	52	1	43	.247	.426
Mike Carp	86	216	34	64	18	2	9	43	1	22	.296	.523
José Iglesias	63	215	27	71	10	2	1	19	3	11	.330	.409
David Ross	36	102	11	22	5	0	4	10	1	11	.216	.382
Jackie Bradley Jr.	37	95	18	18	5	0	3	10	2	10	.189	.337
Ryan Lavarnway	25	77	8	23	7	0	1	14	0	2	.299	.429
Brock Holt	26	59	9	12	2	0	0	11	1	7	.203	.237
Pedro Ciriaco	28	51	4	11	2	1	1	4	2	6	.216	.353
Brandon Snyder	27	50	5	9	3	0	2	7	0	0	.180	.360
Xander Bogaerts	18	44	7	11	2	0	1	5	1	5	.250	.364
John McDonald	6	8	1	2	0	0	0	0	0	1	.250	.250
Quintin Berry	13	8	5	5	0	0	1	4	3	1	.625	1.000
Jonathan Diaz	5	4	2	0	0	0	0	0	0	0	.000	.000
Pitcher totals	162	26	2	1	1	0	0	0	0	0	.038	.077
Team totals	162	5651	853	1566	363	29	178	819	123	581	.277	.446

=== Pitching ===
Note: W = Wins; L = Losses; ERA = Earned run average; G = Games pitched; GS = Games started; SV = Saves; IP = Innings pitched; H = Hits allowed; R = Runs allowed; ER = Earned runs allowed; BB = Walks allowed; SO = Strikeouts

Player	W	L	ERA	G	GS	SV	IP	H	R	ER	BB	SO
Jon Lester	15	8	3.75	33	33	0	213.1	209	94	89	67	177
John Lackey	10	13	3.52	29	29	0	189.1	179	80	74	40	161
Ryan Dempster	8	9	4.57	32	29	0	171.1	170	97	87	79	157
Félix Doubront	11	6	4.32	29	27	0	162.1	161	84	78	71	139
Clay Buchholz	12	1	1.74	16	16	0	108.1	75	23	21	36	96
Koji Uehara	4	1	1.09	73	0	21	74.1	33	10	9	9	101
Junichi Tazawa	5	4	3.16	71	0	0	68.1	70	25	24	12	72
Jake Peavy	4	1	4.04	10	10	0	64.2	56	29	29	19	45
Craig Breslow	5	2	1.81	61	0	0	59.2	49	16	12	18	33
Brandon Workman	6	3	4.97	20	3	0	41.2	44	23	23	15	47
Alfredo Aceves	4	1	4.86	11	6	0	37.0	42	21	20	22	24
Andrew Miller	1	2	2.64	37	0	0	30.2	25	12	9	17	48
Allen Webster	1	2	8.60	8	7	0	30.1	37	30	29	18	23
Clayton Mortensen	1	2	5.34	24	0	0	30.1	32	19	18	16	21
Andrew Bailey	3	1	3.77	30	0	8	28.2	23	12	12	12	39
Alex Wilson	1	1	4.88	26	0	0	27.2	34	16	15	14	22
Franklin Morales	2	2	4.62	20	1	0	25.1	24	13	13	15	21
Drake Britton	1	1	3.86	18	0	0	21.0	21	9	9	7	17
Matt Thornton	0	1	3.52	20	0	0	15.1	22	6	6	5	9
Steven Wright	2	0	5.40	4	1	0	13.1	12	8	8	9	10
Rubby De La Rosa	0	2	5.56	11	0	0	11.1	15	7	7	2	6
José De La Torre	0	0	6.35	7	0	0	11.1	10	8	8	10	15
Pedro Beato	1	1	3.60	10	0	0	10.0	12	5	4	2	5
Joel Hanrahan	0	1	9.82	9	0	4	7.1	10	8	8	6	5
Daniel Bard	0	0	9.00	2	0	0	1.0	1	1	1	2	1
Brayan Villarreal	0	0	—	1	0	0	0.0	0	0	0	1	0
Team totals	97	65	3.79	162	162	33	1454.0	1366	656	613	524	1294

=== Postseason game log ===
Boston Red Sox 2013 Postseason Game Log (11–5)
American League Division Series vs. Tampa Bay Rays* (3–1)

#	Date	Opponent	Score	Win	Loss	Save	Stadium	Attendance	Series	Box/ Streak
1	October 4	Rays	12–2	Lester (1–0)	Moore (0–1)		Fenway Park	38,177	1–0	W1
2	October 5	Rays	7–4	Lackey (1–0)	Price (0–1)	Uehara (1)	Fenway Park	38,705	2–0	W2
3	October 7	@ Rays	4–5	Rodney (1–0)	Uehara (0–1)		Tropicana Field	33,675	2–1	L1
4	October 8	@ Rays	3–1	Breslow (1–0)	McGee (0–1)	Uehara (2)	Tropicana Field	32,807	3–1	W1
RED SOX WIN SERIES 3–1

American League Championship Series vs. Detroit Tigers** (4–2)

#	Date	Opponent	Score	Win	Loss	Save	Stadium	Attendance	Series	Box/ Streak
1	October 12	Tigers	0–1	Sánchez (1–0)	Lester (0–1)	Benoit (1)	Fenway Park	38,210	0–1	L1
2	October 13	Tigers	6–5	Uehara (1–0)	Porcello (0–1)		Fenway Park	38,029	1–1	W1
3	October 15	@ Tigers	1–0	Lackey (1–0)	Verlander (0–1)	Uehara (1)	Comerica Park	42,327	2–1	W2
4	October 16	@ Tigers	3–7	Fister (1–0)	Peavy (0–1)		Comerica Park	42,765	2–2	L1
5	October 17	@ Tigers	4–3	Lester (1–1)	Sánchez (1–1)	Uehara (2)	Comerica Park	42,669	3–2	W1
6	October 19	Tigers	5–2	Tazawa (1–0)	Scherzer (0–1)	Uehara (3)	Fenway Park	38,832	4–2	W2
RED SOX WIN SERIES 4–2

World Series vs. St. Louis Cardinals*** (4–2)

#	Date	Opponent	Score	Win	Loss	Save	Stadium	Attendance	Series	Box/ Streak
1	October 23	Cardinals	8–1	Lester (1–0)	Wainwright (0–1)		Fenway Park	38,345	1–0	W1
2	October 24	Cardinals	2–4	Wacha (1–0)	Lackey (0–1)	Rosenthal (1)	Fenway Park	38,436	1–1	L1
3	October 26	@ Cardinals	4–5	Rosenthal (1–0)	Workman (0–1)		Busch Stadium	47,432	1–2	L2
4	October 27	@ Cardinals	4–2	Doubront (1–0)	Lynn (0–1)	Uehara (1)	Busch Stadium	47,469	2–2	W1
5	October 28	@ Cardinals	3–1	Lester (2–0)	Wainwright (0–2)	Uehara (2)	Busch Stadium	47,436	3–2	W2
6	October 30	Cardinals	6–1	Lackey (1–1)	Wacha (1–1)		Fenway Park	38,447	4–2	W3
RED SOX WIN WORLD SERIES 4–2

*The winner of the 2013 American League Wild Card Game plays the Red Sox. The Wild Card game was contested on October 2 between the Cleveland Indians and the Tampa Bay Rays at Progressive Field. The Rays were victorious by a score of 4–0.

**The winner of the 2013 American League Division Series plays the Red Sox in the ALCS. The ALDS was contested from October 4 to 10 between the Oakland Athletics and the Detroit Tigers. The Tigers won the series 3–2.
***The winner of the 2013 National League Championship Series plays the Red Sox in the WS. The NLCS was contested from October 11 to 18 between the St. Louis Cardinals and the Los Angeles Dodgers. The Cardinals won the series 4–2.

=== Detailed records ===
American League
Opponent	Home	Away	Total	Pct.	Runs scored	Runs allowed
AL East
Baltimore Orioles	4–5	4–6	8–11	.421	84	71
Boston Red Sox	–	–	–	–	–	–
New York Yankees	6–3	7–3	13–6	.684	120	85
Tampa Bay Rays	6–4	6–3	12–7	.632	71	57
Toronto Blue Jays	6–4	5–4	11–8	.579	92	71
	22–16	22–16	44–32	.579	367	284
AL Central
Chicago White Sox	3–0	1–2	4–2	.667	29	22
Cleveland Indians	3–1	3–0	6–1	.857	43	30
Detroit Tigers	2–1	1–3	3–4	.429	43	35
Kansas City Royals	1–2	1–3	2–5	.286	25	33
Minnesota Twins	1–3	3–0	4–3	.571	38	39
	10–7	9–8	19–15	.559	178	159
AL West
Houston Astros	4–0	2–1	6–1	.857	50	27
Los Angeles Angels	2–1	1–2	3–3	.500	35	30
Oakland Athletics	2–1	1–2	3–3	.500	21	32
Seattle Mariners	3–0	3–1	6–1	.857	55	43
Texas Rangers	2–1	0–3	2–4	.333	29	27
	13–3	7–9	20–12	.625	190	159

National League
Opponent	Home	Away	Total	Pct.	Runs scored	Runs allowed
NL West
Arizona Diamondbacks	2–1	–	2–1	.667	15	9
Colorado Rockies	2–0	1–1	3–1	.750	34	20
Los Angeles Dodgers	–	2–1	2–1	.667	12	5
Philadelphia Phillies	1–1	1–1	2–2	.500	22	12
San Diego Padres	3–0	–	3–0	1.000	14	4
San Francisco Giants	–	2–1	2–1	.667	21	4
	8–2	6–4	14–6	.700	118	54

== Awards and honors ==
- Andrew Bailey – AL Player of the Week (April 15–21)
- Clay Buchholz – AL Pitcher of the Month (April)
- José Iglesias – AL Rookie of the Month (June)
- Will Middlebrooks – AL Player of the Week (September 2–8)
- Mike Napoli – AL Player of the Week (April 15–21, September 2–8)
- David Ortiz – Silver Slugger Award (DH)
- Dustin Pedroia – Gold Glove Award (2B)
- Shane Victorino – Gold Glove Award (OF), AL Player of the Week (July 29–August 4)

All-Star Game

- Clay Buchholz, reserve P (did not play)
- David Ortiz, starting DH
- Dustin Pedroia, reserve 2B

== Transactions ==
=== April 2013 ===
- On April 1, signed RHP Gerson Bautista to a minor contract.
- On April 4, designated SS Stephen Drew to AA Sea Dogs for an assignment.
- On April 8, off waiver 1B Mauro Gomez to the Toronto Blue Jays.
- On April 9, optioned SS Jose Iglesias to AAA Red Sox.
- On April 10, activated SS Stephen Drew from the 7-day disabled list, placed RHP John Lackey on the 15-day disabled list with a strained right biceps, retroactive to April 7, and recalled Alex Wilson from AAA Red Sox.
- On April 11, designated DH David Ortiz to AAA Red Sox for an assignment.
- On April 16, placed RHP Joel Hanrahan on the 15-day disabled list with a strained right hamstring, retroactive to April 14, and recalled Steven Wright from AAA Red Sox.
- On April 17, designated LHP Franklin Morales for a rehab assignment.
- On April 18, optioned LF Jackie Bradley Jr. to AAA Red Sox.
- On April 19, activated DH David Ortiz from the 15-day disabled list.
- On April 21, recalled RHP Allen Webster from AAA Red Sox.
- On April 22, optioned RHP Allen Webster to AAA Red Sox, designated RHP John Lackey to AA Sea Dogs for a rehab assignment.
- On April 24, optioned RHP Steven Wright to AAA Red Sox, and recalled RHP Daniel Bard from Sea Dogs.
- On April 25, optioned RHP Alfredo Aceves to AAA Red Sox, and recalled C Ryan Lavarnway from AAA Red Sox.
- On April 26, sent RHP Joel Hanrahan to AAA Red Sox for a rehab assignment.
- On April 28, optioned C Ryan Lavarnway to AAA Red Sox, and activated RHP John Lackey from the 15-day disabled list.
- On April 29, optioned RHP Daniel Bard to AA Sea Dogs.
- On April 30, activated RHP Joel Hanrahan from the 15-day disabled list.

=== May 2013 ===
- On May 1, signed C Isaias Lucena to a minor league contract.
- on May 6, placed RHP Andrew Bailey on the 15-day disabled list with a right biceps inflammation, retroactive to April 29, and activated LHP Craig Breslow from the 15-day disabled list.
- On May 7, placed RHP Joel Hanrahan on the 15-day disabled list with a right forearm strain, and recalled RHP Allen Webster from AAA Red Sox.
- On May 9, optioned RHP Allen Webster to AAA Red Sox, purchased the contract of RHP Jose De La Torre from AAA Red Sox, and transferred RHP Joel Hanrahan from the 15-day disabled list to the 60-day disabled list.
- On May 12, placed C David Ross on the 7-day disabled list with a concussion, and recalled C Ryan Lavarnway from AAA Red Sox.
- On May 18, designated RHP Andrew Bailey to AAA Red Sox for an assignment.
- On May 20, activated RHP Andrew Bailey from the 15-day disabled list, and optioned RHP Jose De La Torre to AAA Red Sox.
- On May 23, designated LHP Franklin Morales to AA Sea Dogs for an assignment, and designated C David Ross to AA Sea Dogs for an assignment.
- On May 24, activated C David Ross from the 7-day disabled list, optioned C Ryan Lavarnway to AAA Red Sox, placed RF Shane Victorino on the 15-day disabled list with a left hamstring strain retroactive to May 21, recalled RHP Alfredo Aceves from AAA Red Sox, placed 3B Will Middlebrooks on the 15-day disabled list with a low back strain, and recalled SS Jose Iglesias from AAA Red Sox.
- On May 25, signed LHP Rafael Perez to a minor league contract.
- On May 28, optioned RHP Alfredo Aceves to AAA Red Sox, and activated LHP Franklin Morales from the 15-day disabled list.
- On May 29, optioned RHP Alex Wilson to AAA Red Sox, and recalled Jackie Bradley Jr. from AAA Red Sox.
- On May 30, signed 3B Mario Martinez to a minor league contract.

=== June 2013 ===
- On June 3, designated 3B Will Middlebrooks to AAA Red Sox for an assignment.
- On June 6, designated RF Shane Victorino to AAA Red Sox for an assignment.
- On June 11, recalled RHP Jose De La Torre from AAA Red Sox, placed RHP Clayton Mortensen on the 15-day disabled list with a strained right groin.
- On June 12, optioned RHP Jose De La Torre to AAA Red Sox, and recalled RHP Alfredo Aceves from AAA Red Sox.
- On June 13, recalled Alex Wilson from AAA Red Sox, optioned RHP Alfredo Aceves to AAA Red Sox.
- On June 14, optioned RHP Alex Wilson from AAA Red Sox, recalled RHP Rubby De La Rosa from AAA Red Sox, traded 3B Pedro Ciriaco to the San Diego Padres as part of a conditional deal.
- On June 16, recalled Pedro Beato from AAA Red Sox, optioned RHP Rubby De La Rosa to the AAA Red Sox.
- On June 18, recalled RHP Alfredo Aceves from AAA Red Sox, placed C David Ross (baseball) on the 7-day disabled list with a concussion, placed RHP Clay Buchholz on the 15-day disabled list with a neck strain, retroactive to June 9, 2013, recalled C Ryan Lavarnway from AAA Red Sox, and recalled Alex Wilson from AAA Red Sox.
- On June 19, optioned RHP Alfredo Aceves to the AAA Red Sox.
- On June 20, designated RHP Clayton Mortensen to AAA Red Sox for a rehab assignment, signed SS Wendell Rijo to a minor league contract, and signed OF Aaron King to a minor league contract, and signed LHP Corey Littrell to a minor league contract.
- On June 21, signed C Jon Denney to a minor league contract, signed OF Jordon Austin to a minor league contract, signed LHP Jake Drehoff to a minor league contract, signed OF Joseph Monge to a minor league contract.
- On June 22, recalled RHP Allen Webster from AAA Red Sox, and optioned Pedro Beato to the AAA Red Sox,

== Farm system ==
Level	Team	League	Manager
AAA	Pawtucket Red Sox	International League	Gary DiSarcina
AA	Portland Sea Dogs	Eastern League	Kevin Boles
A-Advanced	Salem Red Sox	Carolina League	Billy McMillon
A	Greenville Drive	South Atlantic League	Carlos Febles
A-Short Season	Lowell Spinners	New York–Penn League	Bruce Crabbe
Rookie	GCL Red Sox	Gulf Coast League	Darren Fenster
Rookie	DSL Red Sox	Dominican Summer League	José Zapata

LEAGUE CHAMPIONS: Salem
