= José De La Torre =

Puerto Rican baseball player (born 1985)

- Pitcher
- Born: October 17, 1985 (age 40); San Juan, Puerto Rico
- Batted: Right Threw: Right

MLB debut
- May 12, 2013, for the Boston Red Sox

Last MLB appearance
- July 29, 2013, for the Boston Red Sox

MLB statistics
- Win–loss record: 0–0
- Earned run average: 6.35
- Strikeouts: 15
- Stats at Baseball Reference

Teams
- Boston Red Sox (2013)
Medals
Men's baseball
Representing Puerto Rico
World Baseball Classic
| Silver medal – second place | 2013 San Francisco | Team |
| Silver medal – second place | 2017 Los Angeles | Team |

José De La Torre (born October 17, 1985) is a Puerto Rican former professional baseball pitcher. He played in Major League Baseball (MLB) for the Boston Red Sox.

== Career ==
De La Torre attended Dr. Pedro Albizu Campos High School in Toa Baja, Puerto Rico. He then attended Texarkana College in Texarkana, Texas.

=== New York Mets ===
De La Torre signed with the New York Mets organization in 2006.

=== Cleveland Indians ===
He signed with the Cleveland Indians as a minor league free agent before the 2012 season.

=== Boston Red Sox ===
The Indians traded De La Torre to the Boston Red Sox for Brent Lillibridge during the 2012 season.

The Red Sox invited De La Torre to spring training as a non-roster invitee in 2013. De La Torre was named to the Puerto Rico national baseball team for the 2013 World Baseball Classic. De La Torre's contract was purchased from Triple-A Pawtucket on May 9, 2013, to help with a battered bullpen after Joel Hanrahan was placed on the 60-day disabled list. It was De La Torre's first call-up to the majors. He made two appearances before being optioned back to Pawtucket on May 20 when Andrew Bailey returned to the Red Sox from the disabled list. He was recalled on June 11 when Clayton Mortensen went on the disabled list, and sent back down on June 12. He was recalled again on July 5 when Stephen Drew went on the disabled list. He was designated for assignment on September 10, 2013.

=== Milwaukee Brewers ===
He was claimed off waivers by the Milwaukee Brewers on September 13, 2013. He elected free agency on November 6, 2015.

=== Pirates De Campeche ===
De La Torre signed with the Piratas de Campeche of the Mexican League for the 2016 season. He became a free agent after the 2017 season.

== See also ==
- List of Major League Baseball players from Puerto Rico
