= Drake Britton =

American baseball pitcher (born 1989)

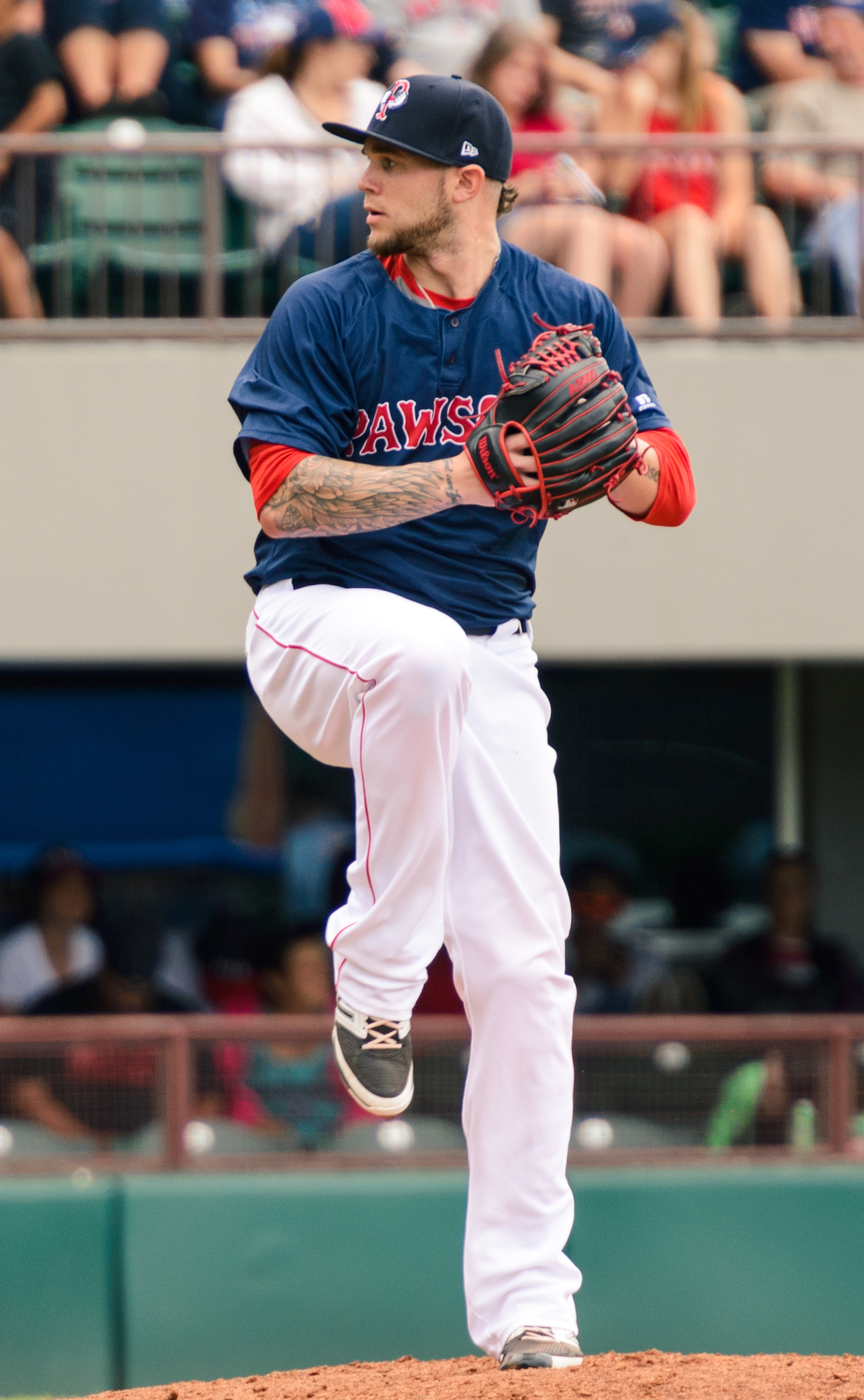
- Britton with the Pawtucket Red Sox
- Pitcher
- Born: May 22, 1989 (age 37); Waco, Texas, U.S.
- Batted: Left Threw: Left

MLB debut
- July 20, 2013, for the Boston Red Sox

Last MLB appearance
- September 28, 2014, for the Boston Red Sox

MLB statistics
- Win–loss record: 1–1
- Earned run average: 2.93
- Strikeouts: 21
- Stats at Baseball Reference

Teams
- Boston Red Sox (2013–2014)

John Drake Britton (born May 22, 1989) is an American former professional baseball pitcher. He played in Major League Baseball (MLB) for the Boston Red Sox.

== Early life ==
Britton was born in Waco, Texas. He attended Tomball High School. In 2006, his junior season, he was recognized as an Aflac All–American. Later that same year, he took part in the Junior Olympics operated by USA Baseball.

== Professional career ==
=== Boston Red Sox ===
The Boston Red Sox selected Britton in the 23rd round of the 2007 MLB draft. Britton signed a $700,000 signing bonus with the Red Sox. He began his professional career in 2008 with the Class A short-season Lowell Spinners. He appeared in eight games, making seven starts, and recorded an ERA of 4.28 over 33.2 innings.

In 2009, Britton split time between the Gulf Coast League Red Sox and Lowell; he combined to appear in 11.2 innings over seven games. He missed most of the season due to Tommy John surgery.

2010 saw Britton promoted to the Class A full-season Greenville Drive, where he started 21 games and compiled a 2.97 ERA.

Britton was promoted once again in 2011 to the Salem Red Sox. In Salem, Britton made 26 starts and posted a 1–13 record. His 13 losses were a league high and His 6.91 ERA was the worst for all Carolina League starters.

In November 2011, Britton was added to the Red Sox' 40-man roster to prevent other teams from selecting him in the Rule 5 Draft.

Britton split 2012 between Salem and the Double–A Portland Sea Dogs of the Eastern League.

Britton remained with Portland at the start of the 2013 season. He joined the Triple–A Pawtucket Red Sox on July 5, and was then called up to the major leagues on July 14. His MLB debut came on July 20 as he did not allow a run in one inning against the New York Yankees. On July 31, Britton tossed a pair of shutout innings against the Seattle Mariners to earn his first MLB win.

=== Chicago Cubs ===
Britton was claimed off waivers by the Chicago Cubs on February 4, 2015. He was outrighted off the roster on April 3. During the 2015 season, Britton played for the Triple-A Iowa Cubs. He pitched in 28 games, including 11 as a starter, and compiled a 7–8 record with one save, a 5.08 ERA, and 45 strikeouts. An injury to his left shoulder caused Britton to spend some of late August and early September on the disabled list.

=== Detroit Tigers ===
On December 11, 2015, Britton signed a minor-league contract with the Detroit Tigers, and was invited to spring training. In 37 appearances for the Toledo Mud Hens, Detroit's Triple–A affiliate, Britton posted a 4.57 ERA over 41 1/3 innings. On August 2, 2016, Britton was suspended 50 games for violating the terms of the Major League Baseball drug policy. He elected free agency following the season on November 7.

=== Bridgeport Bluefish ===
On March 14, 2017, Britton signed with the Bridgeport Bluefish of the Atlantic League of Professional Baseball for the 2017 season.

=== Southern Maryland Blue Crabs ===
On November 1, 2017, Britton was drafted by the Southern Maryland Blue Crabs in the Bridgeport Bluefish dispersal draft. On March 21, 2018, he signed with the Blue Crabs for the 2018 season. He became a free agent following the 2018 season.

== Personal ==
On March 5, 2013, he was pulled over driving 113 miles per hour (182 km/h) in a 45 miles per hour (72 km/h) zone at 4:14 am. He allegedly handed police his debit card when asked for ID. He was charged with DUI. The incident happened hours before a scheduled spring training start with the Red Sox.
