= Allen Webster (baseball) =

American baseball player (born 1990)

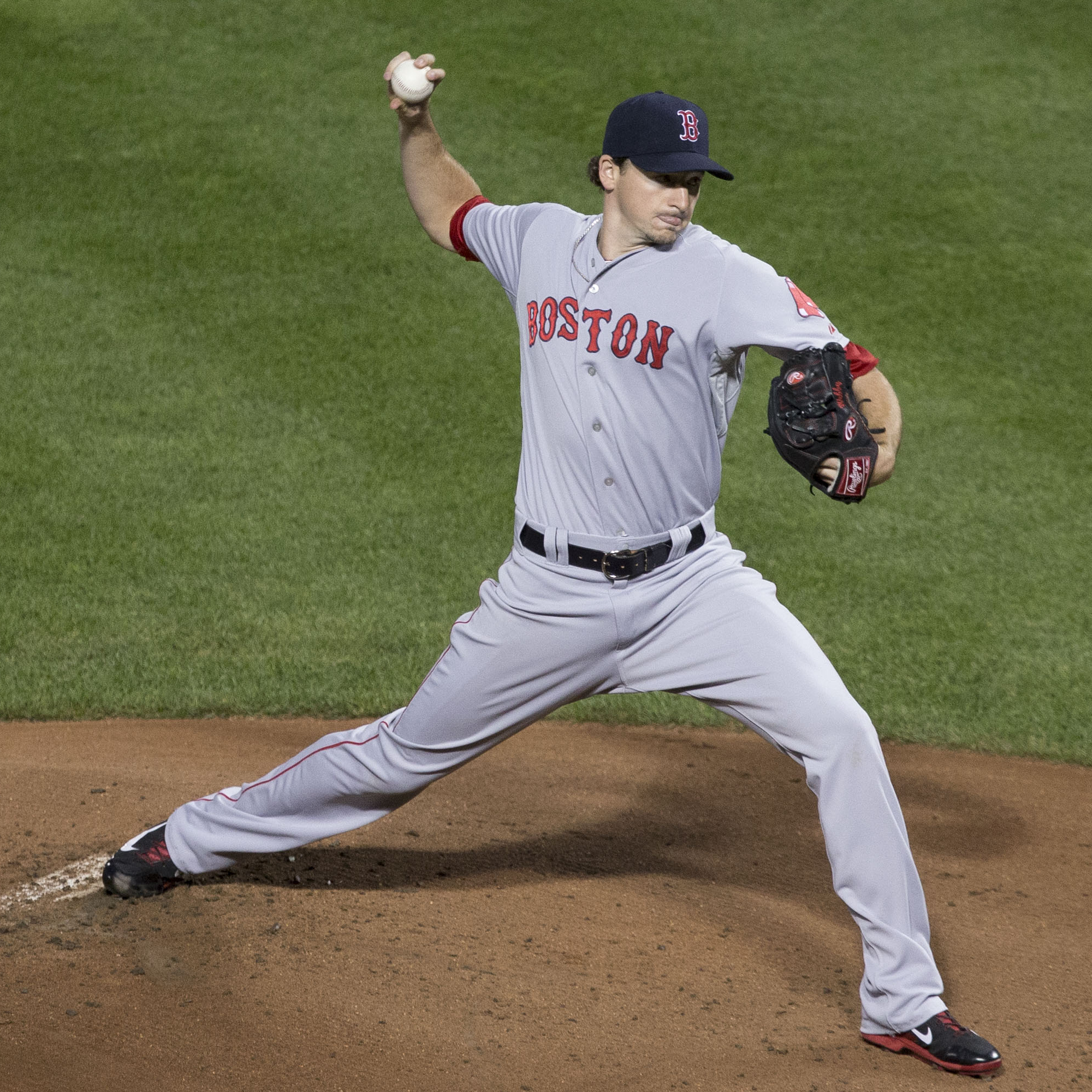
- Webster with the Boston Red Sox in 2014
- Pitcher
- Born: February 10, 1990 (age 36); Greensboro, North Carolina, U.S.
- Batted: Right Threw: Right

Professional debut
- MLB: April 21, 2013, for the Boston Red Sox
- KBO: April 2, 2016, for the Samsung Lions

Last appearance
- MLB: May 10, 2019, for the Chicago Cubs
- KBO: June 5, 2016, for the Samsung Lions

MLB statistics
- Win–loss record: 8–6
- Earned run average: 6.03
- Strikeouts: 88

KBO statistics
- Win–loss record: 4–4
- Earned run average: 5.70
- Strikeouts: 59
- Stats at Baseball Reference

Teams
- Boston Red Sox (2013–2014); Arizona Diamondbacks (2015); Samsung Lions (2016); Chicago Cubs (2018–2019)

Carl Allen Webster (born February 10, 1990) is an American former professional baseball pitcher who played in Major League Baseball (MLB) for the Boston Red Sox, Arizona Diamondbacks and Chicago Cubs. He also played in the KBO League for the Samsung Lions.

== Professional career ==
=== Los Angeles Dodgers ===
Webster was selected by the Los Angeles Dodgers in the 18th round of the 2008 MLB draft and began his career with the Gulf Coast Dodgers in 2008. In 2009, he played primarily with the Arizona League Dodgers and in 2010 was with the Great Lakes Loons where he was 12–9 with a 2.88 ERA in 26 appearances (23 starts) and stuck out 114 batters. In 2011, he started nine games for the Rancho Cucamonga Quakes and was 5–2 with a 2.33 ERA before a mid-season promotion to the Double–A Chattanooga Lookouts. In 2012, he made 22 starts for the Lookouts (and 5 relief appearances) with a 6–8 record and 3.55 ERA.

=== Boston Red Sox ===
On August 25, 2012, Webster was traded to the Boston Red Sox along with infielder Iván DeJesús, Jr., first baseman James Loney, and two players to be named later, in exchange for first baseman Adrián González, pitcher Josh Beckett, outfielder Carl Crawford, infielder Nick Punto, and $11 million. Eventually, pitcher Rubby De La Rosa and OF/1B Jerry Sands were the two players to complete the trade.

Entering 2013, Webster was ranked as the fourth-best prospect in the Red Sox minor league system and ranked 71st in the MLB.com Top 100 Prospects list. The Red Sox added him to their 40-man roster and assigned him to the Triple–A Pawtucket Red Sox to start the season.

The Red Sox called him up to the Majors for the first time on April 21, 2013, to start the second game of a doubleheader. Webster was optioned the next day. Webster was recalled May 7 after reliever Joel Hanrahan went on the disabled list. Webster was optioned back to Pawtucket on May 9, and recalled on June 22. During his time in the Majors of the 2013 season, Webster made 8 appearances (7 starts) going 1–2 with an 8.60 ERA.

=== Arizona Diamondbacks ===
On December 12, 2014, the Red Sox traded Webster, Rubby De La Rosa, and Raymel Flores to the Arizona Diamondbacks in exchange for Wade Miley. The 2015 season proved to be a difficult one for Webster. He was reported to have had shoulder fatigue in April. After struggling to the tune of an 8.18 ERA in Triple–A, Webster was called up to Arizona and made 5 starts while also appearing out of the bullpen four times. The Diamondbacks designated Webster for assignment after the season.

=== Samsung Lions ===
On November 25, 2015, Webster was traded to the Pittsburgh Pirates in exchange for cash considerations. He was released by the Pirates on December 16 and shortly afterwards signed a one-year contract with the Samsung Lions of the KBO League. He managed to start 12 games for the Lions, pitching to a 5.70 ERA.

=== Texas Rangers ===
On November 17, 2016, the Texas Rangers signed Webster to a minor league deal. He made 12 appearances (11 starts) for the Triple–A Round Rock Express, registering a 4–4 record and 6.79 ERA with 44 strikeouts across 58 1/3 innings pitched. Webster elected free agency following the season on November 6, 2017.

=== Chicago Cubs ===
On March 2, 2018, Webster signed a minor league contract with the Chicago Cubs. In 17 games split between the rookie-level Arizona League Cubs, Double-A Tennessee Smokies, and Triple-A Iowa Cubs, Webster pitched to a 2.65 ERA with 24 strikeouts, and was called up to the major leagues on September 19. In 3 games for Chicago, he worked to a 6.00 ERA with 3 strikeouts over 3 innings of work. On November 30, the Cubs non-tendered Webster, making him a free agent.

On December 19, 2018, Webster re-signed with Chicago on a new minor league contract. With the Cubs struggling at the start of the 2019 season, Webster was called up to the majors to bolster the bullpen. In his first relief appearance for the Cubs on April 6, the first batter he faced, Milwaukee's Ryan Braun, hit a three-run homer. On May 11, Webster was placed on the 10-day disabled list and later moved to the 60-day list as a result of radial nerve inflammation. On July 3, he began rehabilitation assignments with the rookie-level AZL Cubs, continuing on July 9 with Double–A Tennessee. On November 4, Webster was removed from the 40-man roster and sent outright to Triple-A Iowa. He subsequently rejected the assignment and elected free agency.

=== Washington Nationals ===
On March 9, 2020, Webster signed a minor league deal with the Washington Nationals. He was subsequently assigned to the Nationals' Double-A affiliate, the Harrisburg Senators. However, the Senators' 2020 schedule was canceled, along with that of every other Minor League Baseball team because of the COVID-19 pandemic, and Webster was released by the organization on May 31.
