= Pedro Beato =

Dominican baseball pitcher (born 1986)

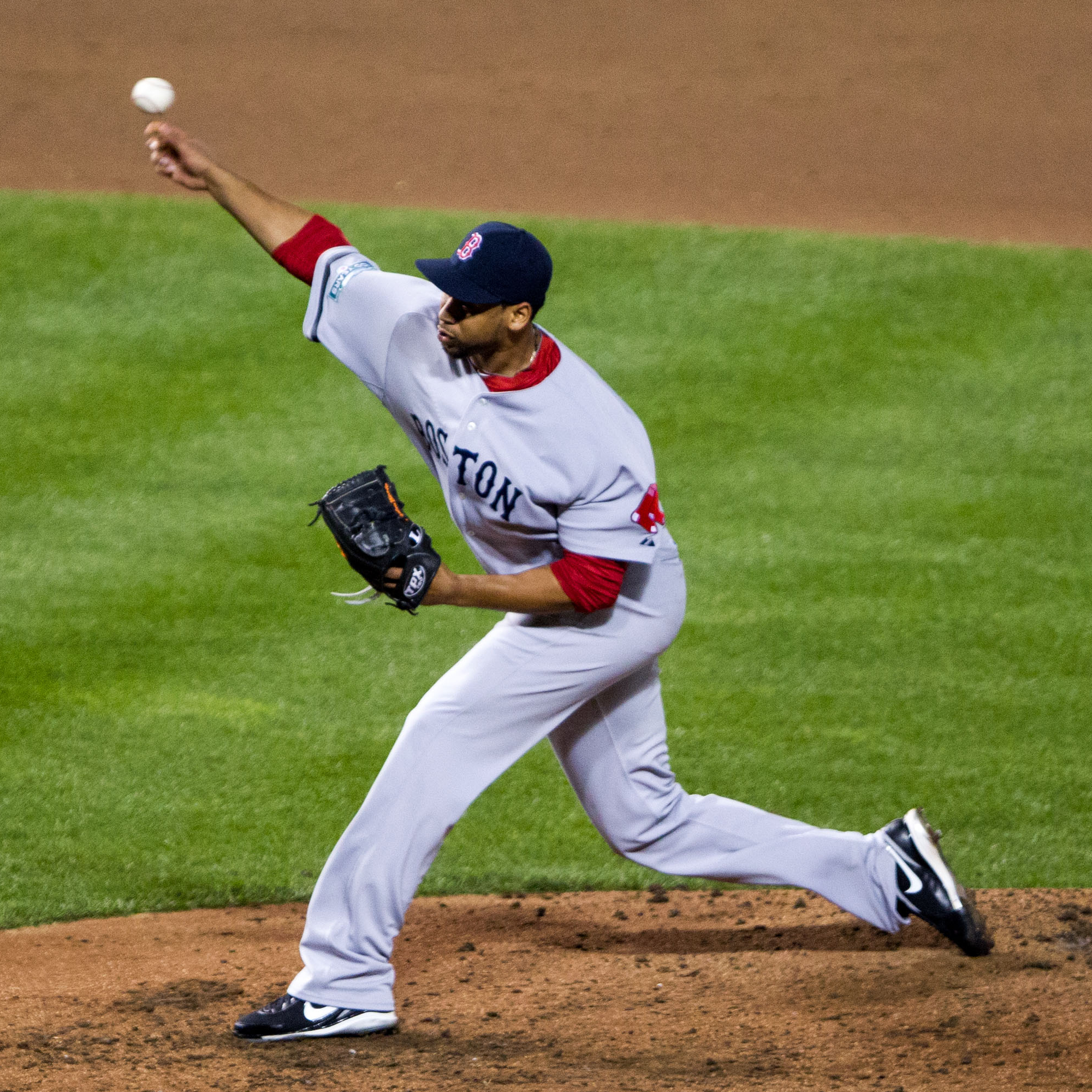
- Beato with the Boston Red Sox
- Pitcher
- Born: October 27, 1986 (age 40); Santo Domingo, Dominican Republic
- Batted: Right Threw: Right

MLB debut
- April 1, 2011, for the New York Mets

Last MLB appearance
- July 29, 2017, for the Philadelphia Phillies

MLB statistics
- Win–loss record: 4–2
- Earned run average: 4.31
- Strikeouts: 60
- Stats at Baseball Reference

Teams
- New York Mets (2011–2012); Boston Red Sox (2012–2013); Atlanta Braves (2014); Philadelphia Phillies (2017)

Pedro Beato (born October 27, 1986) is a Dominican former professional baseball pitcher. He pitched in Major League Baseball (MLB) for the New York Mets, Boston Red Sox, Atlanta Braves, and Philadelphia Phillies.

== Early life ==
Beato was born in Santo Domingo, Dominican Republic on the day that the Mets won the 1986 world series, and moved to Ridgewood, Queens as a child. He attended Xaverian High School in Brooklyn, New York. He was drafted by the New York Mets in the 17th round of the 2005 Major League Baseball draft, but did not sign. He opted to attend St. Petersburg College. He played baseball in the summer for the Youth Service League.

== Career ==
=== Baltimore Orioles ===
Beato was drafted by the Baltimore Orioles in the first round (32nd overall) of the 2006 Major League Baseball draft.

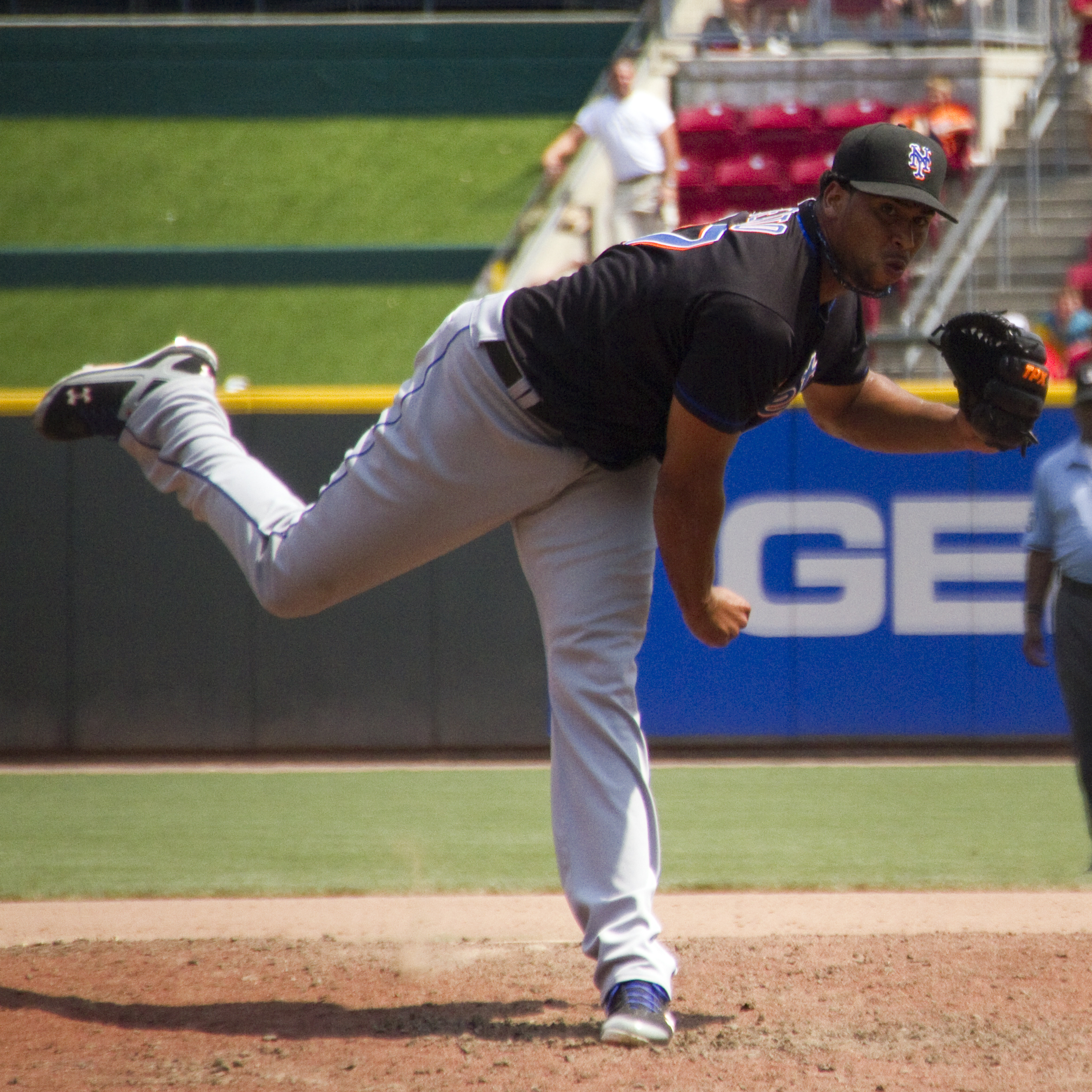
Beato pitching for the New York Mets in 2011.

Going into the 2007 season, Beato was rated the 99th best prospect in baseball by Baseball America. He participated in the 2007 All-Star Futures Game.

=== New York Mets ===
In the 2010 Rule 5 Draft, Beato was selected by the New York Mets off of the Norfolk Tides roster. Beato was named to the Mets' Opening Day roster. He made his major league debut on April 1, 2011.

In his first 18 2/3 innings, Beato allowed no earned runs, setting the Mets franchise record for longest scoreless inning streak to start a career. In those 18 2/3 innings, Beato allowed only nine hits and three walks.

=== Boston Red Sox ===
On August 16, 2012, the Mets traded Beato to the Boston Red Sox as the player to be named later in the trade that sent Kelly Shoppach to the Mets. He was designated for assignment by the Red Sox on December 19, 2012. He cleared waivers and was sent outright to Triple-A Pawtucket Red Sox on December 21.

Beato started the 2013 season on a minor league contract with the Triple-A Pawtucket Red Sox. His contract was selected from Pawtucket, and he was brought up to Boston on June 16, 2013.

He was designated for assignment on October 23, 2013.

=== Cincinnati Reds ===
On October 31, 2013, Beato was claimed off waivers by the Cincinnati Reds. The Reds designated Beato for assignment on March 30, 2014.

=== Atlanta Braves ===
On April 2, 2014, Beato was claimed off waivers by the Atlanta Braves. They optioned him to Triple-A Gwinnett on April 9, after he made one appearance. In 24 games with Gwinnett, he was 1–0 with a 3.49 ERA. On June 17, he was recalled to replace David Carpenter, who went on the disabled list. Two days later, the same fate happened to him, as he was placed on the disabled list. He was outrighted off the Braves roster on July 11, 2014. In 3 appearances with Atlanta, Beato didn't give up a run in 4 1/3 innings. Beato elected free agency in October 2014.

=== Baltimore Orioles (second stint) ===
On March 3, 2015, Beato signed a minor league contract with the Baltimore Orioles organization. He spent the year with the Triple-A Norfolk Tides, posting a 5–5 record and 2.65 ERA with 61 strikeouts and 16 saves in 74.2 innings pitched. He elected free agency on November 6.

On November 26, 2015, Beato re-signed with the Orioles on a new minor league contract. Beato returned to Norfolk in 2016, registering an identical 5–5 record and 2.65 ERA with 62 strikeouts and 4 saves in 68.0 innings of work. He elected free agency following the season on November 7, 2016.

=== Philadelphia Phillies ===
On January 7, 2017, Beato signed a minor league contract with the Philadelphia Phillies. He was added to the team's 40-man roster on July 29 and debuted with the team that night, but exited the game with a hamstring injury and was placed on the ten-day disabled list the following day. He was designated for assignment on August 17.

On December 22, 2017, Beato re–signed with the Phillies on a minor league contract. In 63 relief outings for the Triple–A Lehigh Valley IronPigs, he registered a 3.04 ERA with 67 strikeouts and 35 saves across 68 innings pitched. Beato elected free agency following the season on November 2, 2018.

On March 5, 2019, Beato again re-signed with the team on a minor league contract. However, he was released by the Phillies organization on March 28.

=== Diablos Rojos del México ===
On April 3, 2019, Beato signed with the Diablos Rojos del México of the Mexican League. In 28 appearances for México, he posted a 3–1 record and 4.71 ERA with 24 strikeouts and three saves across 28 2/3 innings pitched. Beato was released by the Diablos on June 19.

=== Long Island Ducks ===
On June 27, 2019, Beato signed with the Long Island Ducks of the Atlantic League of Professional Baseball. He made 21 appearances (seven starts) for Long Island, compiling a 3–3 record and 5.81 ERA with 46 strikeouts and nine saves over 48 innings of work. Beato became a free agent following the season.
