= Clayton Mortensen =

American baseball player (born 1985)

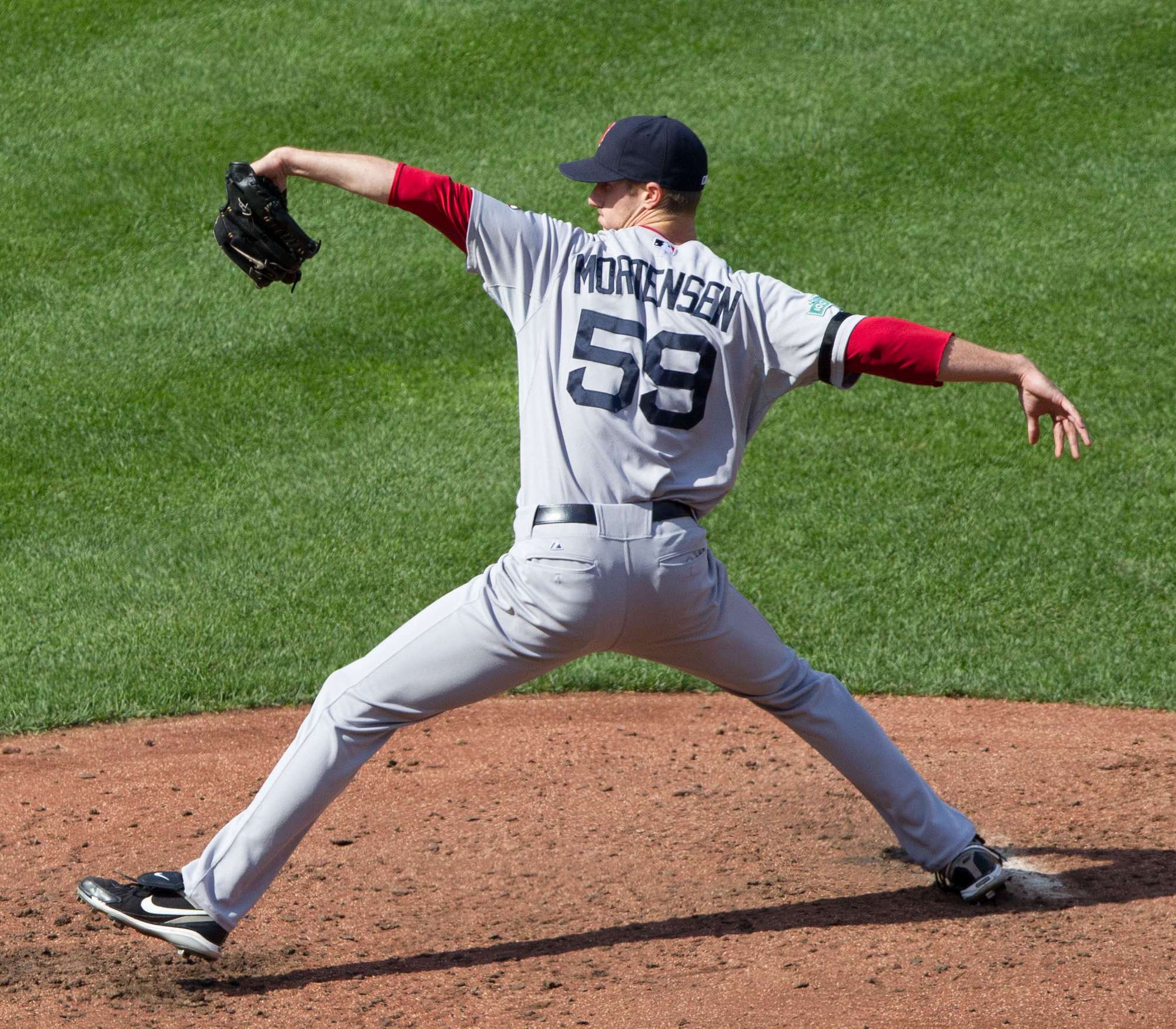
- Mortensen with the Boston Red Sox
- Pitcher
- Born: April 10, 1985 (age 41); Rexburg, Idaho, U.S.
- Batted: Right Threw: Right

MLB debut
- June 29, 2009, for the St. Louis Cardinals

Last MLB appearance
- June 10, 2013, for the Boston Red Sox

MLB statistics
- Win–loss record: 6–11
- Earned run average: 4.68
- Strikeouts: 112
- Stats at Baseball Reference

Teams
- St. Louis Cardinals (2009); Oakland Athletics (2009–2010); Colorado Rockies (2011); Boston Red Sox (2012–2013)

Clayton Grant Mortensen (born April 10, 1985) is an American former professional baseball pitcher and current coach. He played in Major League Baseball (MLB) for the St. Louis Cardinals, Oakland Athletics, Colorado Rockies, and Boston Red Sox.

== Amateur career ==
After graduating from Madison High School, Mortensen went to Treasure Valley Community College, then Gonzaga University. He played college baseball for the Bulldogs from 2006–2007.

== Professional career ==
=== St. Louis Cardinals ===
Mortensen was drafted by the St. Louis Cardinals 36th overall in the 2007 Major League Baseball draft.

He was invited to spring training 2009, but began the season in the minors. He was called up to the major leagues for the first time on June 29, 2009.

=== Oakland Athletics ===
On July 24, 2009, Mortensen was traded to the Oakland Athletics along with Brett Wallace and Shane Peterson for Matt Holliday. He was called up to the Athletics to replace Russ Springer on August 8.

=== Colorado Rockies ===
Mortensen was designated for assignment in January 2011 and was eventually traded to the Colorado Rockies for minor league pitcher Ethan Hollingsworth.

=== Boston Red Sox ===
On January 21, 2012 Mortensen was traded to the Boston Red Sox for Marco Scutaro. Mortensen made his Red Sox debut on May 2, 2012 throwing three innings and giving up just one hit. On July 7, Mortensen was called up to the majors to be the 26th man for the Red Sox and Yankees double-header. Mortenson was recalled on August 8, when Vincente Padilla was placed on the disabled list.

Mortensen was designated for assignment by the Red Sox on June 29, 2013. After clearing waivers, Mortensen was assigned outright to the Pawtucket Red Sox on July 3.

=== Kansas City Royals ===
On August 27, 2013, the Red Sox traded Mortensen to the Kansas City Royals for Quintin Berry. Mortensen made one start in Triple-A before the season concluded. In 2014, Mortensen made 16 appearances (15 starts) for the Triple-A Omaha Storm Chasers, posting a 5-4 record and 4.74 ERA with 62 strikeouts in 76 innings pitched.

In 2015, Mortensen returned to Omaha, pitching in 24 games (starting 17) and logging a 7-9 record and 5.40 ERA with 81 strikeouts in 106 2/3 innings of work. He elected free agency following the season on November 6, 2015.

Mortensen saw game time for Omaha for the fourth straight season in 2016, appearing in 32 games and pitching to a 3-5 record and 5.65 ERA with 70 strikeouts in 63 2/3 innings pitched. He elected free agency following the season on November 7, 2016.

=== Miami Marlins ===
On April 4, 2017, Mortensen signed a minor league contract with the Miami Marlins, and was assigned to the Triple-A New Orleans Baby Cakes. In 41 appearances split between New Orleans and the Double–A Jacksonville Jumbo Shrimp, he worked to a combined 6–1 record and 5.47 ERA with 61 strikeouts and 7 saves in 51.0 innings of work. He elected free agency following the season on November 6.

=== Kansas City Royals (second stint) ===
On January 20, 2018, Mortensen signed a minor league deal with the Kansas City Royals. Mortensen did not throw a pitch in 2018. He elected free agency on November 2, 2018.

== Coaching career ==
=== Kansas City Royals ===
Mortensen retired after the 2018 season and was named as the Pitching Coach for the Idaho Falls Chukars for the 2019 season.

=== Chicago Cubs ===
He was named the Myrtle Beach Pelicans pitching coach for the 2021 season. He was named pitching coach for the South Bend Cubs the Chicago Cubs High-A affiliate for the 2023 season.

Mortensen kept the role of pitching coach in 2024, shifting to the rookie–level Arizona Complex League Cubs.

=== Kansas City Royals (second stint) ===
On January 17, 2025, the Kansas City Royals hired Mortensen to serve as the assistant pitching coach for their High-A affiliate, the Quad Cities River Bandits.

== Pitching style ==
Mortensen threw four pitches: a four-seam fastball and two-seam fastball at 88–90 mph, a slider at 85–87, and a circle changeup at 79–81. The slider tended to be used more against right-handed batters, and the changeup was used more against left-handed hitters. Mortensen's slider had a somewhat unusual and unpredictable movement:

My slider isn’t a typical slider. It doesn’t necessarily break right-to-left. It has more depth to it, so it’s more of a down-ball. It also has three different movements, depending on where my release point is. When I really accentuate staying on top of it — away to a righty — it will have a little depth and a little right-to-left movement. If I try to throw it down the middle, it’s more straight down. Sometimes it kind of screws. It's basically because of the way I grip it. I kind of cock my wrist a little bit. To be honest, I try to throw it as hard as I can and it just kind of does what it wants to do.

== Personal life ==
On the night of October 2, 2009, Mortensen was arrested on suspicion of drunken driving and spent the night in the Santa Clara County Jail.

Mortensen is married to Janna and they had two children, Miles and Harper. Miles died at the age of 6 on September 11, 2018 after a long battle with stage IV Neuroblastoma.
