= 2013 Cleveland Indians season =

2013 Cleveland Indians
- American League Wild Card winners
- League: American League
- Division: Central
- Ballpark: Progressive Field
- City: Cleveland, Ohio
- Record: 92–70 (.568)
- Divisional place: 2nd
- Owners: Larry Dolan
- General managers: Chris Antonetti
- Managers: Terry Francona
- Television: SportsTime Ohio · WKYC (Matt Underwood, Rick Manning, Katie Witham)
- Radio: WTAM · WMMS; Cleveland Indians Radio Network (Tom Hamilton, Jim Rosenhaus)

The 2013 Cleveland Indians season was the 113th season for the franchise. The team, managed by Terry Francona, began their season on April 2. They advanced to the postseason and lost to the Tampa Bay Rays in the ALWC Game.

== Offseason ==
=== Departures ===
Infielder Brent Lillibridge refused assignment and became a free agent on November 25, 2012. The Indians did not tender contracts to infielder Jack Hannahan, Rafael Perez and Chris Seddon, making them free agents. All three went on to sign with other clubs. In a three-team trade on December 11, the Indians traded Shin-Soo Choo, Jason Donald, Tony Sipp and Lars Anderson.

=== Arrivals ===
Following the firing of three-year manager Manny Acta, the Indians signed former Boston Red Sox manager, Terry Francona to a four-year deal on October 6, 2012. Francona and Sandy Alomar Jr. were the only candidates for the position. Francona previously had a history with the Cleveland Indians as a front office advisor in 2001. Also, Francona and his dad, Tito, both played in the Major Leagues for the Indians. He stated that he is close with Indians president, Mark Shapiro and general manager, Chris Antonetti and that's what intrigued him the most.

On November 2, Blake Wood was claimed off waivers from Kansas City. The next day, Mike Avilés and Yan Gomes were acquired in a trade with Toronto. Mike McDade was also claimed off waivers from Toronto about a month later. On December 9, the Indians signed Mark Reynolds to a one-year, $6 million contract. Two days later, the Indians made their biggest trade of the offseason. They acquired Drew Stubbs from Cincinnati and Trevor Bauer, Bryan Shaw, and Matt Albers from Arizona. In one of the biggest signings of the offseason, the Indians signed Nick Swisher to a four-year, $56 million on December 23. Brett Myers agreed to a 1-year, $7 million deal January 1, 2013. After signing Michael Bourn to a four-year $48 million contract, the Indians finished the offseason with spending $117 million on free agents after spending just $8 million the past two seasons.

The busy offseason left many fans and writers saying the Indians will be the most improved team in 2013 and "if there was an offseason championship, the trophy would be heading to Cleveland".

== Spring training ==
On November 29, the Indians announced their spring training schedule. Pitchers and catchers reported to spring training on February 10, 2013. The first full team workout took place on February 15 and the first game took place on February 22 against the Cincinnati Reds.

=== Injuries ===
Michael Brantley was accidentally spiked by Oakland Athletics third basemen Josh Donaldson on February 25 at spring training. He received 15 stitches and was expected to be out 10 days. Chris Perez also sprained his shoulder during spring training and was expected to be out three to four weeks. The Indians had several players on the disabled list (DL) to start the season; Frank Herrmann, Blake Wood and Josh Tomlin started the season on the 60-day DL after having Tommy John surgery.

== Regular season ==
The Indians started the regular season in Toronto against the Blue Jays on April 2. Their home opener, which was on April 8, sold out in 6 minutes; one of the fastest sell outs in Indians history.

=== Opening Day starting lineup ===
1. CF Michael Bourn
2. SS Asdrúbal Cabrera
3. 2B Jason Kipnis
4. 1B Nick Swisher
5. LF Michael Brantley
6. C Carlos Santana
7. DH Mark Reynolds
8. 3B Lonnie Chisenhall
9. RF Drew Stubbs

SP Justin Masterson

=== April ===
For the second straight year, the Indians opened the season against the Toronto Blue Jays, this time in Toronto. Unlike the 2012 opener, the Indians won the game 4–1 with ace Justin Masterson going eight dominant innings and closer Chris Perez picking up the save. Despite this win, the Tribe started the season slowly, at just 8–13. The Indians' struggles during April included a crushing 11–6 defeat by the New York Yankees in the team's home opener, and a 3-game sweep at the hands of the Boston Red Sox.

The Indians' fortunes turned around late in the month. Beginning with the second game of an April 28 doubleheader against the Kansas City Royals, the Indians won six straight games and 18 of 22 going through the middle of May. On April 30, the Indians tied a team record with seven home runs in a game, as they defeated the Philadelphia Phillies 14–2.

=== May ===
The Indians started May on a high note, winning 15 of their first 19 games of the month. This included four-game sweeps of the defending AL West champion Oakland Athletics and the Seattle Mariners, the latter of which featuring three walk-off hits. After the Seattle series, however, the Indians struggled for the rest of the month and into early June, losing 16 of their next 20, including a May 26 loss to the Boston Red Sox, in which the Indians blew a 5–2 9th inning lead and closer Chris Perez left the game with a shoulder injury. Perez would be out until late June.

During April and May, the Indians defeated seven former Cy Young Award winners: R. A. Dickey (April 2), David Price (April 7), Roy Halladay (April 30), Cliff Lee (May 1), Bartolo Colón (May 9), Justin Verlander (May 11), and Félix Hernández (May 19). Also, slugger Mark Reynolds was among the league leaders with 14 home runs at the end of May.

=== June ===
June started slowly for the Indians as they lost eight straight games from June 2–10. After that losing streak, however, the Indians would go 14–5 the rest of the month. Vinnie Pestano filled the role of closer as Chris Perez was on the disabled list for most of the month.

Second baseman Jason Kipnis was named the American League Player of the Month for June. During the month, he hit .419 with 12 doubles, four home runs, and 25 RBI. He also stole nine bases and received Player of the Week honors twice during June.

=== July ===
on July 6, second baseman Jason Kipnis and starting pitcher Justin Masterson were named to the American League All-Star team. This marked the first All-Star selection for both Kipnis and Masterson. Kipnis had an RBI double in the game, as the American League won 3–0.

The Indians started July by losing 5 of 7 to division rivals Kansas City and Detroit, before finishing the first half on a strong note, taking five of six from Toronto and Kansas City. Late July was highlighted by an eight-game winning streak, which included sweeps of the then AL West leading Texas Rangers and the Chicago White Sox.

The sweep of Chicago was the Tribe's second four-game sweep over the White Sox of the season, marking the first time since 1960 that the Indians swept two four-game series from the same club. On the July 29 win over the White Sox, slugger Jason Giambi became the oldest player ever to hit a walk-off home run at 42 years and 202 days. Chris Perez regained his closing duties in July and saved eight games. Meanwhile, late reliever Vinnie Pestano had struggled throughout the month and was sent to AAA Columbus on July 31.

=== August ===
On August 5, the Indians began a key four-game home series against the Detroit Tigers just three games behind Detroit for the division lead. Taking a 2–0 lead into the 9th inning of game 1, Chris Perez gave up four runs en route to a 4–2 loss. The Tigers ended up sweeping the series and leaving Cleveland with a 7-game lead. The Indians went on to lose their next two games – to the Los Angeles Angels of Anaheim – and were in danger of finishing their homestand 0–7, which would be their first winless homestand since 2004. They managed to win that final game 6–5 after trailing 5–0.

The team's struggles continued throughout the month, as they finished August 12–16, their worst month of the season. The Indians lost their final 5 games of the month to playoff contenders Atlanta and Detroit.

=== September ===
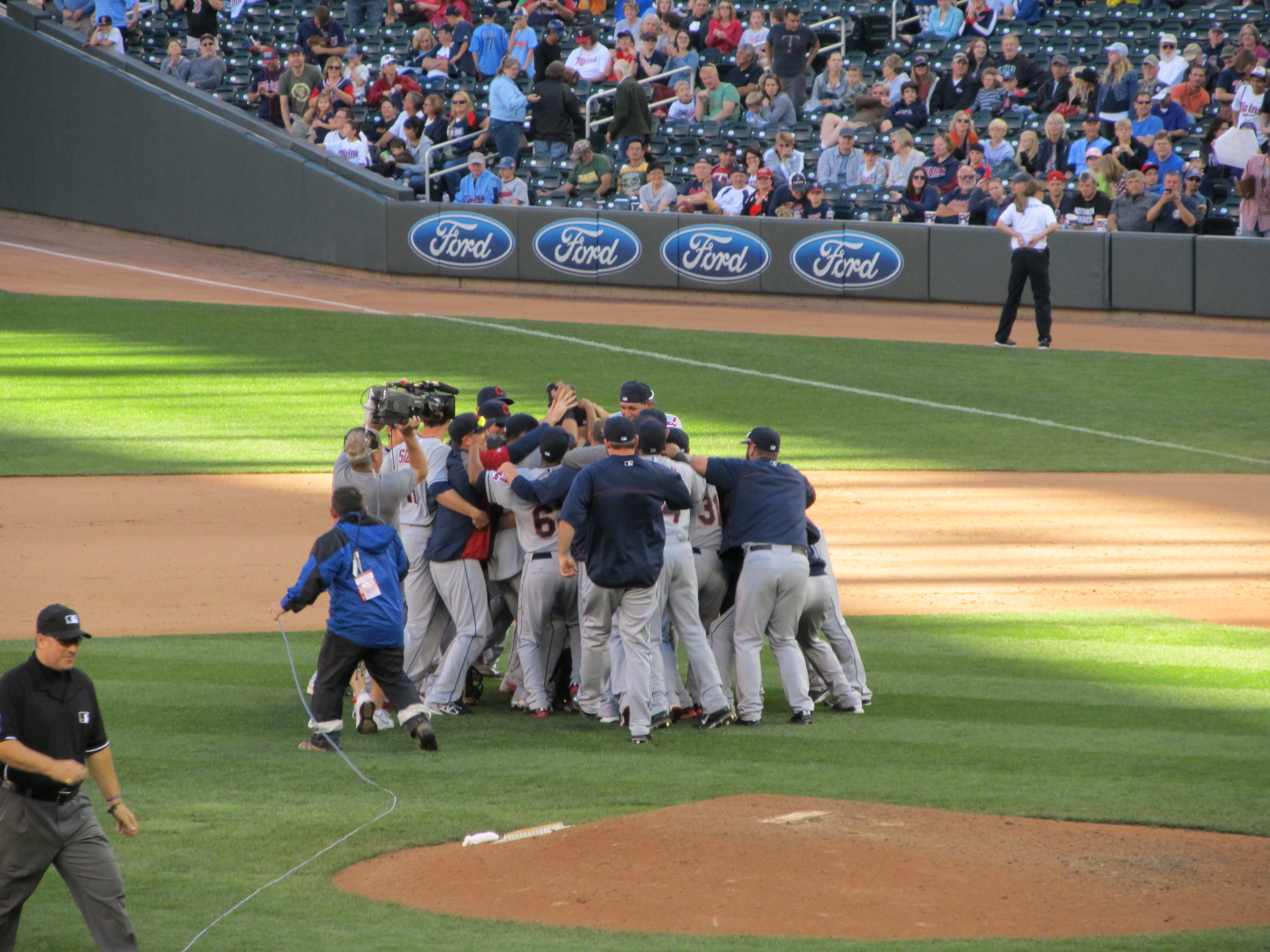
The Indians celebrate after clinching a wild card slot

On September 1, the Indians salvaged their final game of the season against Detroit, 4–0 on a Mike Avilés grand slam, but the Tigers won the season series 15–4 and had a commanding lead in the division. The next day, all-star starter Justin Masterson left the game against the Baltimore Orioles with an oblique injury. The Indians lost that game and sat 3 1/2 games out of a wild card spot without their top pitcher.

Indians #2 starter Ubaldo Jiménez stepped up in Masterson's absence, going 4–0 with a 1.09 ERA during the month of September. He was named American League Pitcher of the Month. The Indians played some of their best baseball of the season in September, going 21–6 in the month including a 10-game winning streak to close the season. Throughout the month, the Indians closed the gap on the Texas Rangers and Tampa Bay Rays, and took the lead for one of the wild card spots with about a week left in the regular season. The Indians needed this strong month to clinch a Wild Card spot, as they were not able to clinch until the final game of the season, a 5–1 victory over the division rival Twins. The Indians finished the season 92–70, which was good enough for the top wild card spot, which meant they would host the 2013 American League Wild Card Game at Progressive Field. This was the Indians' first playoff appearance since 2007. They finished one game better than both Texas and Tampa Bay, who would face off in a tie-breaker game. Tampa Bay won this game, and the Wild Card playoff was set.

Also of note during the month, the Indians swept the Chicago White sox in a four-game series for the third time this season, a first in franchise history and the first time since 1963 that any team accomplished this feat. The Indians finished the season 17–2 against the White Sox. On September 24, Jason Giambi hit a walk-off home run against the White Sox, again becoming the oldest player ever to hit a walk-off home run at 42 years and 259 days, breaking the record he set less than two months earlier.

== Season standings ==
=== American League Central ===
AL Central
Team	W	L	Pct.	GB	Home	Road
Detroit Tigers	93	69	.574	—	51‍–‍30	42‍–‍39
Cleveland Indians	92	70	.568	1	51‍–‍30	41‍–‍40
Kansas City Royals	86	76	.531	7	44‍–‍37	42‍–‍39
Minnesota Twins	66	96	.407	27	32‍–‍49	34‍–‍47
Chicago White Sox	63	99	.389	30	37‍–‍44	26‍–‍55

=== American League Wild Card ===
Division winners
Team	W	L	Pct.
Boston Red Sox	97	65	.599
Oakland Athletics	96	66	.593
Detroit Tigers	93	69	.574

Wild Card teams (Top 2 teams qualify for postseason)
Team	W	L	Pct.	GB
Cleveland Indians	92	70	.568	+½
Tampa Bay Rays	92	71	.564	—
Texas Rangers	91	72	.558	1
Kansas City Royals	86	76	.531	5½
New York Yankees	85	77	.525	6½
Baltimore Orioles	85	77	.525	6½
Los Angeles Angels of Anaheim	78	84	.481	13½
Toronto Blue Jays	74	88	.457	17½
Seattle Mariners	71	91	.438	20½
Minnesota Twins	66	96	.407	25½
Chicago White Sox	63	99	.389	28½
Houston Astros	51	111	.315	40½

=== Record vs. opponents ===
2013 American League record Source: MLB Standings Grid – 2013
Team	BAL	BOS	CWS	CLE	DET	HOU	KC	LAA	MIN	NYY	OAK	SEA	TB	TEX	TOR	NL
Baltimore	—	11–8	4–3	3–4	4–2	4–2	3–4	5–2	3–3	9–10	5–2	2–4	6–13	5–2	10–9	11–9
Boston	8–11	—	4–2	6–1	3–4	6–1	2–5	3–3	4–3	13–6	3–3	6–1	12–7	2–4	11–8	14–6
Chicago	3–4	2–4	—	2–17	7–12	3–4	9–10	3–4	8–11	3–3	2–5	3–3	2–5	4–2	4–3	8–12
Cleveland	4–3	1–6	17–2	—	4–15	6–1	10–9	4–2	13–6	1–6	5–2	5–2	2–4	5–1	4–2	11–9
Detroit	2–4	4–3	12–7	15–4	—	6–1	9–10	0–6	11–8	3–3	3–4	5–2	3–3	3–4	5–2	12–8
Houston	2–4	1–6	4–3	1–6	1–6	—	2–4	10–9	1–5	1–5	4–15	9–10	2–5	2–17	3–4	8–12
Kansas City	4–3	5–2	10–9	9–10	10–9	4–2	—	2–5	15–4	2–5	1–5	4–3	6–1	3–3	2–4	9–11
Los Angeles	2–5	3–3	4–3	2–4	6–0	9–10	5–2	—	1–5	3–4	8–11	11–8	4–3	4–15	6–1	10–10
Minnesota	3–3	3–4	11–8	6–13	8–11	5–1	4–15	5–1	—	2–5	1–6	4–3	1–6	4–3	1–5	8–12
New York	10–9	6–13	3–3	6–1	3–3	5–1	5–2	4–3	5–2	—	1–5	4–3	7–12	3–4	14–5	9–11
Oakland	2–5	3–3	5–2	2–5	4–3	15–4	5–1	11–8	6–1	5–1	—	8–11	3–3	10–9	4–3	13–7
Seattle	4–2	1–6	3–3	2–5	2–5	10–9	3–4	8–11	3–4	3–4	11–8	—	3–3	7–12	3–3	8–12
Tampa Bay	13–6	7–12	5–2	4–2	3–3	5–2	1–6	3–4	6–1	12–7	3–3	3–3	—	4–4	11–8	12–8
Texas	2–5	4–2	2–4	1–5	4–3	17–2	3–3	15–4	3–4	4–3	9–10	12–7	4–4	—	1–6	10–10
Toronto	9–10	8–11	3–4	2–4	2–5	4–3	4–2	1–6	5–1	5–14	3–4	3–3	8–11	6–1	—	11–9

=== Detailed records ===
American League
Opponent	Home	Away	Total	Pct.	Runs scored	Runs allowed
AL East
Baltimore Orioles	2–1	2–2	4–3	.571	15	18
Boston Red Sox	0–3	1–3	1–6	.143	30	43
New York Yankees	1–3	0–3	1–6	.143	19	49
Tampa Bay Rays	1–2	1–2	2–4	.333	23	30
Toronto Blue Jays	2–1	2–1	4–2	.667	26	20
	6–10	6–11	12–21	.364	113	160
AL Central
Chicago White Sox	8–1	9–1	17–2	.895	52	33
Cleveland Indians	–	–	–	–	–	–
Detroit Tigers	2–8	2–7	4–15	.211	48	78
Kansas City Royals	6–4	4–5	10–9	.526	50	44
Minnesota Twins	6–3	7–3	13–6	.684	32	26
	22–16	22–16	44–32	.579	182	181
AL West
Houston Astros	0–0	2–1	2–1	.667	26	13
Los Angeles Angels	0–0	0–0	0–0	–	0	0
Oakland Athletics	4–0	0–0	4–0	1.000	21	8
Seattle Mariners	4–0	0–0	4–0	1.000	27	15
Texas Rangers	3–0	2–1	5–1	.833	31	18
	11–0	4–2	15–2	.882	105	54

National League
Opponent	Home	Away	Total	Pct.	Runs scored	Runs allowed
Atlanta Braves	—	0–3	0–3	.000	3	8
Cincinnati Reds	2–0	0–2	2–2	.500	16	15
Miami Marlins	—	2–1	2–1	.667	6	13
New York Mets	2–1	—	2–1	.667	18	7
Philadelphia Phillies	2–0	1–1	3–1	.750	32	12
Washington Nationals	2–1	—	2–1	.667	10	8
	8–3	3–7	11–9	.550	85	63

== Roster ==
2013 Cleveland Indians
Roster
Pitchers: 32 Matt Albers; 37 Cody Allen; 51 Scott Barnes; 47 Trevor Bauer; 59 Carlos Carrasco; 36 Preston Guilmet; 50 Nick Hagadone; 53 Rich Hill; 31 David Huff; 30 Ubaldo Jiménez; 26 Scott Kazmir; 28 Corey Kluber; 55 Matt Langwell; 20 C. C. Lee; 57 Joe Martinez; 63 Justin Masterson; 34 Zach McAllister; 39 Brett Myers; 54 Chris Perez; 52 Vinnie Pestano; 57 Clay Rapada; 35 Mark Rzepczynski; 31 Danny Salazar; 27,47 Bryan Shaw; 38 Joe Smith; 43 Josh Tomlin; 49 Blake Wood	Catchers: 10 Yan Gomes; 6 Lou Marson; 41 Carlos Santana; 58 Omir Santos; 40 Kelly Shoppach; Infielders: 4 Mike Avilés; 13 Asdrúbal Cabrera; 8 Lonnie Chisenhall; 22 Jason Kipnis; 7 John McDonald; 46 Cord Phelps; 62 José Ramírez; 12 Mark Reynolds; 33 Nick Swisher	Outfielders: 24 Michael Bourn; 23 Michael Brantley; 1 Ezequiel Carrera; 7 Matt Carson; 12 Jason Kubel; 9 Ryan Raburn; 11 Drew Stubbs; Other batters: 25 Jason Giambi	Manager: 17 Terry Francona; Coaches: 15 Sandy Alomar Jr. (bench); 44 Mickey Callaway (pitching); 64 Armando Camacaro (bullpen catcher); 45 Kevin Cash (bullpen); 2 Brad Mills (third base); 60 Francisco Morales (bullpen catcher); 16 Mike Sarbaugh (first base); 29 Ty Van Burkleo (hitting)

== Game log ==
2013 Game Log: 92–70 (Home: 51–30; Away: 41–40)
April: 11–13 (Home: 3–6; Away: 8–7)

#	Date	Opponent	Score	Win	Loss	Save	Attendance	Record	Streak
1	April 2	@ Blue Jays	4–1	Masterson (1–0)	Dickey (0–1)	Perez (1)	48,857	1–0	W1
2	April 3	@ Blue Jays	3–2 (11)	Albers (1–0)	Santos (0–1)	Smith (1)	24,619	2–0	W2
3	April 4	@ Blue Jays	8–10	Delabar (1–0)	Myers (0–1)	Janssen (1)	19,515	2–1	L1
4	April 5	@ Rays	0–4	Moore (1–0)	McAllister (0–1)	—	16,019	2–2	L2
5	April 6	@ Rays	0–6	Cobb (1–0)	Bauer (0–1)	—	32,217	2–3	L3
6	April 7	@ Rays	13–0	Masterson (2–0)	Price (0–1)	—	21,629	3–3	W1
7	April 8	Yankees	6–11	Kuroda (1–1)	Jiménez (0–1)	—	41,567	3–4	L1
8	April 9	Yankees	1–14	Pettitte (2–0)	Carrasco (0–1)	—	12,663	3–5	L2
	April 10	Yankees	Postponed (rain). Makeup: May 13 (Game 1)						
	April 11	Yankees	Postponed (rain). Makeup: May 13 (Game 2)						
9	April 12	White Sox	1–0	Masterson (3–0)	Crain (0–1)	—	11,864	4–5	W1
10	April 13	White Sox	9–4	McAllister (1–1)	Sale (1–1)	—	11,422	5–5	W2
11	April 14	White Sox	1–3	Peavy (2–1)	Myers (0–2)	Reed (4)	11,682	5–6	L1
12	April 16	Red Sox	2–7	Doubront (1–0)	Jiménez (0–2)	—	9,143	5–7	l2
13	April 17	Red Sox	3–6	Aceves (1–0)	Masterson (3–1)	Bailey (1)	10,282	5–8	L3
14	April 18	Red Sox	3–6	Lester (3–0)	McAllister (1–2)	Bailey (2)	12,936	5–9	L4
15	April 19	@ Astros	2–3	Harrell (1–2)	Myers (0–3)	Veras (1)	17,241	5–10	L5
16	April 20	@ Astros	19–6	Kluber (1–0)	Humber (0–4)		19,904	6–10	W1
17	April 21	@ Astros	5–4	Allen (1–0)	Ambriz (0–1)	Perez (2)	22,005	7–10	W2
18	April 22	@ White Sox	3–2	Masterson (4–1)	Thornton (0–1)	Perez (3)	14,950	8–10	W3
	April 23	@ White Sox	Postponed (rain). Makeup: June 28 (Game 1)						
19	April 24	@ White Sox	2–3	Quintana (2–0)	McAllister (1–3)	Reed (6)	16,765	8–11	L1
	April 26	@ Royals	Postponed (rain). Makeup: April 28 (Game 2)						
20	April 27	@ Royals	2–3	Santana (3–1)	Kazmir (0–1)	Holland (6)	19,224	8–12	L2
21	April 28	@ Royals	0–9	Guthrie (3–0)	Masterson (4–2)	—	22,001	8–13	L3
22	April 28	@ Royals	10–3	Kluber (2–0)	Smith (0–1)	—	19,831	9–13	W1
23	April 29	@ Royals	9–0	Jiménez (1–2)	Davis (2–2)	—	14,255	10–13	W2
24	April 30	Phillies	14–2	McAllister (2–3)	Halladay (2–3)	—	10,841	11–13	W3

May: 18–12 (Home: 14–5, Road: 4–7)

#	Date	Opponent	Score	Win	Loss	Save	Attendance	Record
25	May 1	Phillies	6–0	Bauer (1–1)	Lee (2–2)		12,730	12–13
26	May 3	Twins	7–6 (10)	Perez (1–0)	Fien (1–2)		20,200	13–13
27	May 4	Twins	7–3	Kazmir (1–1)	Correia (3–2)		17,830	14–13
28	May 5	Twins	4–2	Pelfrey (3–3)	Kluber (2–1)	Perkins (7)	14,015	14–14
29	May 6	Athletics	7–3	Jiménez (2–2)	Parker (1–5)		9,514	15–14
30	May 7	Athletics	1–0	McAllister (3–3)	Milone (3–4)	Perez (4)	9,474	16–14
31	May 8	Athletics	4–3	Masterson (5–2)	Griffin (3–3)	Perez (5)	11,125	17–14
32	May 9	Athletics	9–2	Kazmir (2–1)	Colón (3–2)		12,477	18–14
33	May 10	@ Tigers	10–4	Scherzer (5–0)	Kluber (2–2)		37,547	18–15
34	May 11	@ Tigers	7–6	Jiménez (3–2)	Verlander (4–3)	Perez (6)	41,438	19–15
35	May 12	@ Tigers	4–3 (10)	Smith (1–0)	Downs (0–1)	Allen (1)	35,260	20–15
36	May 13	Yankees	1–0	Masterson (6–2)	Phelps (1–2)		—	21–15
37	May 13	Yankees	7–0	Nuño (1–0)	Bauer (1–2)	Warren (1)	23,299	21–16
38	May 14	@ Phillies	6–2	Pettibone (3–0)	Kazmir (2–2)		39,689	21–17
39	May 15	@ Phillies	10–4	Kluber (3–2)	Hamels (1–6)		38,440	22–17
40	May 17	Mariners	6–3 (10)	Pestano (1–0)	Luetge (0–1)		34,282	23–17
41	May 18	Mariners	5–4	Perez (2–0)	Pérez (1–1)		17,574	24–17
42	May 19	Mariners	6–0	Masterson (7–2)	Hernández (5–3)		19,744	25–17
43	May 20	Mariners	10–8 (10)	Smith (2–0)	Furbush (0–3)		19,390	26–17
44	May 21	Tigers	5–1	Scherzer (6–0)	Kluber (3–3)		17,374	26–18
45	May 22	Tigers	11–7	Verlander (5–4)	Jiménez (3–3)		16,562	26–19
46	May 23	@ Red Sox	12–3	McAllister (4–3)	Dempster (2–5)	Barnes (1)	35,254	27–19
47	May 24	@ Red Sox	8–1	Lackey (3–4)	Masterson (7–3)		34,074	27–20
48	May 25	@ Red Sox	7–4	Tazawa (4–2)	Pestano (1–1)	Bailey (6)	36,504	27–21
49	May 26	@ Red Sox	6–5	Breslow (2–0)	Perez (2–1)		37,046	27–22
50	May 27	@ Reds	4–2	Broxton (2–1)	Hagadone (0–1)	Chapman (13)	38,822	27–23
51	May 28	@ Reds	8–2	Latos (5–0)	McAllister (4–4)		28,812	27–24
52	May 29	Reds	5–2	Masterson (8–3)	Arroyo (5–5)		18,004	28–24
53	May 30	Reds	7–1	Kazmir (3–2)	Bailey (3–4)		18,364	29–24
54	May 31	Rays	9–2	Wright (1–1)	Barnes (0–1)	Ramos (1)	29,603	29–25

June: 15–13 (Home: 7–4, Away: 8–9)

#	Date	Opponent	Score	Win	Loss	Save	Attendance	Record
55	June 1	Rays	5–0	Jiménez (4–3)	Archer (0–1)		22,748	30–25
56	June 2	Rays	11–3	Hellickson (3–2)	McAllister (4–5)		18,106	30–26
57	June 3	@ Yankees	7–4	Kelley (3–0)	Masterson (8–4)		40,007	30–27
58	June 4	@ Yankees	4–3	Phelps (4–3)	Kazmir (3–3)	Rivera (21)	36,208	30–28
59	June 5	@ Yankees	6–4	Sabathia (6–4)	Kluber (3–4)		42,477	30–29
60	June 7	@ Tigers	7–5	Verlander (8–4)	Jiménez (4–4)		39,008	30–30
61	June 8	@ Tigers	6–4	Porcello (3–3)	Carrasco (0–2)	Valverde (8)	41,691	30–31
62	June 9	@ Tigers	4–1	Alvarez (1–0)	Masterson (8–5)	Benoit (3)	41,262	30–32
63	June 10	@ Rangers	6–3	Ross (3–1)	Kazmir (3–4)	Nathan (20)	33,003	30–33
64	June 11	@ Rangers	5–2	Kluber (4–4)	Holland (5–3)		45,200	31–33
65	June 12	@ Rangers	5–2	Jiménez (5–4)	Tepesch (3–6)		34,248	32–33
66	June 14	Nationals	2–1	Smith (3–0)	Abad (0–1)		30,824	33–33
67	June 15	Nationals	7–6	Storen (1–1)	Pestano (1–2)	Soriano (18)	33,307	33–34
68	June 16	Nationals	2–0	Kluber (5–4)	Strasburg (3–6)	Pestano (1)	21,845	34–34
69	June 17	Royals	2–1	Crow (3–2)	Shaw (0–1)	Holland (15)	12,803	34–35
70	June 18	Royals	4–3	Allen (2–0)	Herrera (3–5)	Pestano (2)	14,853	35–35
71	June 19	Royals	6–3	Masterson (9–5)	Mendoza (2–4)		17,349	36–35
72	June 21	Twins	5–1	Kazmir (4–4)	Deduno (3–2)		26,442	37–35
73	June 22	Twins	8–7	Kluber (6–4)	Walters (2–3)	Pestano (3)	21,417	38–35
74	June 23	Twins	5–3	Hernández (3–1)	Carrasco (0–3)	Perkins (19)	17,143	38–36
75	June 24	@ Orioles	5–2	Jiménez (6–4)	Britton (1–2)	Pestano (4)	18,544	39–36
76	June 25	@ Orioles	6–3	Tillman (9–2)	Masterson (9–6)	Johnson (27)	20,924	39–37
77	June 26	@ Orioles	4–3	Smith (4–0)	Johnson (2–6)	Pestano (5)	18,082	40–37
78	June 27	@ Orioles	7–3	González (6–3)	Kluber (6–5)		33,036	40–38
79	June 28	@ White Sox	19–10	Albers (2–0)	Omogrosso (0–2)		—	41–38
80	June 28	@ White Sox	9–8	Langwell (1–0)	Reed (3–1)	Pestano (6)	28,628	42–38
81	June 29	@ White Sox	4–3	Martinez (1–0)	Crain (2–3)	Perez (7)	26,289	43–38
82	June 30	@ White Sox	4–0	Masterson (10–6)	Sale (5–7)		27,032	44–38

July: 15–10 (Home: 12–4, Away: 3–6)

#	Date	Opponent	Score	Win	Loss	Save	Attendance	Record
83	July 2	@ Royals	6–5	Allen (3–0)	Collins (2–3)	Perez (8)	15,625	45–38
84	July 3	@ Royals	6–5	Smith (1–1)	Allen (3–1)	Holland (18)	28,534	45–39
85	July 4	@ Royals	10–7	Hochevar (2–1)	Shaw (0–2)	Holland (19)	16,792	45–40
86	July 5	Tigers	7–0	Porcello (5–6)	Masterson (10–7)		40,167	45–41
87	July 6	Tigers	9–4	Sánchez (7–5)	Carrasco (0–4)		28,054	45–42
88	July 7	Tigers	9–6	Allen (4–1)	Alburquerque (1–2)	Perez (9)	20,503	46–42
89	July 8	Tigers	4–2 (10)	Smyly (4–0)	Albers (2–1)	Benoit (7)	23,640	46–43
90	July 9	Blue Jays	3–0	Jiménez (7–4)	Johnson (1–4)	Perez (10)	13,640	47–43
91	July 10	Blue Jays	5–4	Wagner (2–3)	Hill (0–1)	Delabar (1)	14,134	47–44
92	July 11	Blue Jays	4–2	Salazar (1–0)	Dickey (8–10)	Perez (11)	20,641	48–44
93	July 12	Royals	3–0	Kluber (7–5)	Collins (2–4)	Allen (2)	24,077	49–44
94	July 13	Royals	5–3	Kazmir (5–4)	Guthrie (8–7)	Perez (12)	29,740	50–44
95	July 14	Royals	6–4	Hill (1–1)	Collins (2–5)	Perez (13)	15,432	51–44
96	July 19	@ Twins	3–2	Fien (2–2)	Smith (4–1)	Perkins (22)	36,280	51–45
97	July 20	@ Twins	3–2	Correia (7–6)	Hill (1–2)	Perkins (23)	38,626	51–46
98	July 21	@ Twins	7–1	Masterson (11–7)	Diamond (5–9)		31,753	52–46
99	July 22	@ Mariners	2–1	Harang (5–8)	Jiménez (7–5)	Wilhemsen (22)	18,000	52–47
100	July 23	@ Mariners	4–3	Ramírez (1–0)	McAllister (4–6)	Wilhelmsen (23)	16,308	52–48
101	July 24	@ Mariners	10–1	Kazmir (6–4)	Saunders (9–9)		25,688	53–48
102	July 26	Rangers	11–8 (11)	Shaw (1–2)	Frasor (0–2)		27,419	54–48
103	July 27	Rangers	1–0	Masterson (12–7)	Darvish (9–5)	Perez (14)	24,422	55–48
104	July 28	Rangers	6–0	Jiménez (8–5)	Ogando (8–5)		19,673	56–48
105	July 29	White Sox	3–2	Perez (3–1)	Troncoso (1–3)		14,868	57–48
106	July 30	White Sox	7–4	Shaw (2–2)	Veal (1–2)	Perez (15)	16,437	58–48
107	July 31	White Sox	6–5 (10)	Perez (4–1)	Axelrod (4–1)		22,258	59–48

August 12–16 (Home: 4–7, Road: 8–9)

#	Date	Opponent	Score	Win	Loss	Save	Attendance	Record
108	August 1	White Sox	6–1	Masterson (13–7)	Sale (6–11)		20,189	60–48
109	August 2	@ Marlins	0–10	Fernández (8–5)	Jiménez (8–6)		17,731	60–49
110	August 3	@ Marlins	4–3	Allen (5–1)	Jennings (1–2)	Perez (16)	22,997	61–49
111	August 4	@ Marlins	2–0	Kazmir (7–4)	Eovaldi (2–2)	Perez (17)	25,077	62–49
112	August 5	Tigers	2–4	Alburquerque (2–2)	Perez (4–2)	Benoit (13)	24,381	62–50
113	August 6	Tigers	1–5	Verlander (12–8)	Masterson (13–8)		24,676	62–51
114	August 7	Tigers	5–6 (14)	Bonderman (2–3)	Shaw (2–3)	Benoit (14)	20,169	62–52
115	August 8	Tigers	3–10	Scherzer (17–1)	McAllister (4–7)		25,131	62–53
116	August 9	Angels	2–5	Weaver (7–5)	Kazmir (7–5)	De La Rosa (1)	28,729	62–54
117	August 10	Angels	2–7	Wilson (12–6)	Jiménez (8–7)		32,733	62–55
118	August 11	Angels	6–5	M. Albers (3–1)	Gutiérrez (0–3)	Perez (18)	23,433	63–55
119	August 12	@ Twins	0–3	A. Albers (2–0)	Salazar (1–1)		30,922	63–56
120	August 13	@ Twins	5–2	McAllister (5–7)	Deduno (7–6)	Perez (19)	29,806	64–56
121	August 14	@ Twins	9–8 (12)	Perez (5–2)	Pressly (3–3)	Smith (2)	35,133	65–56
122	August 16	@ Athletics	2–3	Doolittle (4–4)	Masterson (13–9)	Balfour (31)	17,491	65–57
123	August 17	@ Athletics	7–1	Jiménez (9–7)	Straily (6–7)		35,067	66–57
124	August 18	@ Athletics	3–7	Otero (2–0)	Kazmir (7–6)		21,114	66–58
125	August 19	@ Angels	5–2	McAllister (6–7)	Weaver (7–7)		36,574	67–58
126	August 20	@ Angels	4–1 (14)	Carrasco (1–4)	Blanton (2–14)		36,421	68–58
127	August 21	@ Angels	3–1	Masterson (14–9)	Williams (5–10)	Perez (20)	35,810	69–58
128	August 23	Twins	1–5	Deduno (8–7)	Jiménez (9–8)		23,218	69–59
129	August 24	Twins	7–2	McAllister (7–7)	Hendriks (0–2)		26,870	70–59
130	August 25	Twins	3–1	Smith (5–1)	Burton (2–7)	Perez (21)	21,042	71–59
131	August 27	@ Braves	0–2	Wood (3–2)	Salazar (1–2)	Kimbrel (42)	21,400	71–60
132	August 28	@ Braves	2–3	Kimbrel (3–2)	Smith (5–2)		20,804	71–61
133	August 29	@ Braves	1–3	Medlen (11–12)	Jiménez (9–9)	Kimbrel (43)	22,081	71–62
134	August 30	@ Tigers	2–7 (7)	Porcello (11–7)	McAllister (7–8)	Rondón (1)	37,067	71–63
135	August 31	@ Tigers	5–10	Sánchez (12–7)	Kazmir (7–7)		41,272	71–64

September 21–6 (Home: 11–4, Road: 10–2)

#	Date	Opponent	Score	Win	Loss	Save	Attendance	Record
136	September 1	@ Tigers	4–0	Smith (6–2)	Benoit (4–1)		41,557	72–64
137	September 2	Orioles	2–7	Norris (10–10)	Masterson (14–10)		15,020	72–65
138	September 3	Orioles	4–3	Jiménez (10–9)	Tillman (15–5)		9,962	73–65
139	September 4	Orioles	6–4	Shaw (3–3)	Gausman (2–4)	Perez (22)	11,522	74–65
140	September 6	Mets	8–1	Kazmir (8–7)	Wheeler (7–4)		15,962	75–65
141	September 7	Mets	9–4	Kluber (8–5)	Niese (6–7)		21,453	76–65
142	September 8	Mets	1–2	Francisco (1–0)	Perez (5–3)	Hawkins (8)	13,317	76–66
143	September 9	Royals	4–3	Jiménez (11–9)	Santana (8–9)	Perez (23)	9,794	77–66
144	September 10	Royals	3–6	Guthrie (14–10)	McAllister (7–9)	Holland (41)	12,615	77–67
145	September 11	Royals	2–6	Shields (11–9)	Kazmir (8–8)	Holland (42)	12,085	77–68
146	September 12	@ White Sox	14–3	Kluber (9–5)	Danks (4–13)		14,375	78–68
147	September 13	@ White Sox	3–1	Shaw (4–3)	Santiago (4–9)	Perez (24)	15,533	79–68
148	September 14	@ White Sox	8–1	Jiménez (12–9)	Rienzo (2–2)		28,024	80–68
149	September 15	@ White Sox	7–1	McAllister (8–9)	Sale (11–13)		18,631	81–68
150	September 16	@ Royals	1–7	Shields (12–9)	Kazmir (8–9)		15,413	81–69
151	September 17	@ Royals	5–3	Allen (6–1)	W. Davis (7–11)	Perez (25)	21,685	82–69
152	September 18	@ Royals	2–7	Chen (8–3)	Salazar (1–3)		21,198	82–70
153	September 19	Astros	2–1	Shaw (5–3)	R. Cruz (0–2)		12,607	83–70
154	September 20	Astros	2–1 (7)	McAllister (9–9)	Clemens (4–6)		26,611	84–70
155	September 21	Astros	4–1	Kazmir (9–9)	Clemens (4–6)		26,611	85–70
156	September 22	Astros	9–2	Kluber (10–5)	Bédard (4–12)		26,168	86–70
157	September 24	White Sox	5–4	Shaw (6–3)	A. Reed (5–4)		21,083	87–70
158	September 25	White Sox	7–2	Salazar (2–3)	Axelrod (4–11)		30,942	88–70
159	September 26	@ Twins	6–5	Shaw (7–3)	Albers (2–5)		24,929	89–70
160	September 27	@ Twins	12–6	Kluber (11–5)	Hernández (3–3)		24,074	90–70
161	September 28	@ Twins	5–1	Kazmir (10–9)	De Vries (0–2)		30,452	91–70
162	September 29	@ Twins	5–1	Jiménez (13–9)	Diamond (6–13)		30,935	92–70

== Player stats ==
=== Batting ===
Note: G = Games played; AB = At bats; R = Runs scored; H = Hits; 2B = Doubles; 3B = Triples; HR = Home runs; RBI = Runs batted in; AVG = Batting average; SB = Stolen bases

Player	G	AB	R	H	2B	3B	HR	RBI	AVG	SB
Matt Albers	5	0	0	0	0	0	0	0	—	0
Cody Allen	8	0	0	0	0	0	0	0	—	0
Mike Avilés	124	361	54	91	15	0	9	46	.252	8
Scott Barnes	1	0	0	0	0	0	0	0	—	0
Trevor Bauer	1	1	0	0	0	0	0	0	.000	0
Michael Bourn	130	525	75	138	21	6	6	50	.263	23
Michael Brantley	151	556	66	158	26	3	10	73	.284	17
Asdrúbal Cabrera	136	508	66	123	35	2	14	64	.242	9
Ezequiel Carrera	2	4	1	2	0	0	0	1	.500	0
Carlos Carrasco	1	0	0	0	0	0	0	0	—	0
Matt Carson	20	11	5	7	0	0	1	3	.636	3
Lonnie Chisenhall	94	289	30	65	17	0	11	36	.225	1
Jason Giambi	71	186	21	34	8	0	9	31	.183	0
Yan Gomes	88	293	45	86	18	2	11	38	.294	2
Nick Hagadone	2	0	0	0	0	0	0	0	—	0
Rich Hill	5	0	0	0	0	0	0	0	—	0
Ubaldo Jiménez	3	3	0	0	0	0	0	0	.000	0
Scott Kazmir	2	4	0	1	0	0	0	0	.250	0
Jason Kipnis	149	564	86	160	36	4	17	84	.284	30
Corey Kluber	1	2	1	0	0	0	0	0	.000	0
Jason Kubel	8	18	0	3	1	0	0	0	.167	0
Zach McAllister	2	4	0	0	0	0	0	0	.000	0
John McDonald	8	7	2	0	0	0	0	0	.000	0
Lou Marson	3	3	0	0	0	0	0	0	.000	0
Justin Masterson	1	2	0	1	0	0	0	0	.500	0
Chris Perez	4	0	0	0	0	0	0	0	—	0
Cord Phelps	4	9	0	0	0	0	0	0	.000	0
Ryan Raburn	86	243	40	66	18	0	16	55	.272	0
José Ramírez	15	12	5	4	0	1	0	0	.333	0
Mark Reynolds	99	335	40	72	8	0	15	48	.215	3
Mark Rzepczynski	2	0	0	0	0	0	0	0	—	0
Danny Salazar	1	2	0	0	0	0	0	0	.000	0
Carlos Santana	154	541	75	145	39	1	20	74	.268	3
Omir Santos	1	1	0	0	0	0	0	0	.000	0
Bryan Shaw	7	0	0	0	0	0	0	0	—	0
Kelly Shoppach	1	2	0	0	0	0	0	0	.000	0
Drew Stubbs	146	430	59	100	21	2	10	45	.233	17
Nick Swisher	145	549	74	135	27	2	22	63	.246	1
Team totals	162	5465	745	1391	290	23	171	711	.255	117

=== Pitching ===
Note: W = Wins; L = Losses; ERA = Earned run average; G = Games pitched; GS = Games started; SV = Saves; IP = Innings pitched; H = Hits allowed; R = Runs allowed; ER = Earned run average; BB = Walks allowed; K = Strikeouts

Player	W	L	ERA	G	GS	SV	IP	H	R	ER	BB	K
Matt Albers	3	1	3.14	56	0	0	63.0	57	25	22	23	35
Cody Allen	6	1	2.43	77	0	2	70.1	62	22	19	26	88
Scott Barnes	0	1	7.27	6	0	1	8.2	8	7	7	3	10
Trevor Bauer	1	2	5.29	4	4	0	17.0	15	11	10	16	11
Carlos Carrasco	1	4	6.75	15	7	0	46.2	64	36	35	18	30
Preston Guilmet	0	0	10.13	4	0	0	5.1	8	6	6	3	1
Nick Hagadone	0	1	5.46	36	0	0	31.1	24	21	19	21	30
Rich Hill	1	2	6.28	63	0	0	38.2	38	30	27	29	51
David Huff	0	0	15.00	3	0	0	3.0	7	5	5	1	5
Ubaldo Jiménez	13	9	3.30	32	32	0	182.2	163	75	67	80	194
Scott Kazmir	10	9	4.04	29	29	0	158.0	162	76	71	47	162
Corey Kluber	11	5	3.85	26	24	0	147.1	153	67	63	33	136
Matt Langwell	1	0	5.06	5	0	0	5.1	5	3	3	2	6
C. C. Lee	0	0	4.15	8	0	0	4.1	4	3	2	3	4
Zach McAllister	9	9	3.75	24	24	0	134.1	134	65	56	49	101
Joe Martinez	1	0	1.80	2	0	0	5.0	4	1	1	0	3
Justin Masterson	14	10	3.45	32	29	0	193.0	156	75	74	76	195
Brett Myers	0	3	8.02	4	3	0	21.1	29	19	19	5	12
Chris Perez	5	3	4.33	54	0	25	54.0	56	27	26	21	54
Vinnie Pestano	1	2	4.08	37	0	6	35.1	37	18	16	21	37
Ryan Raburn	0	0	0.00	1	0	0	1.0	0	0	0	0	1
Clay Rapada	0	0	0.00	4	0	0	2.0	1	0	0	2	0
Mark Rzepczynski	0	0	0.89	27	0	0	20.1	11	4	2	6	20
Danny Salazar	2	3	3.12	10	10	0	52.0	44	18	18	15	65
Bryan Shaw	7	3	3.24	70	0	1	75.0	60	31	27	28	73
Joe Smith	6	2	2.29	70	0	3	63.0	54	17	16	23	54
Josh Tomlin	0	0	0.00	1	0	0	2.0	2	0	0	0	0
Blake Wood	0	0	0.00	2	0	0	1.1	1	0	0	3	1
Team totals	92	70	3.82	162	162	38	1441.1	1359	662	611	554	1379

== Notes/records ==
- On April 7, Justin Masterson became the third pitcher in Major League history to defeat both reigning Cy Young Award winners in the same season by defeating David Price. He had previously defeated R. A. Dickey on April 2.
- On April 20, Jason Giambi homered against the Houston Astros, the last team in baseball he had never done so against.
- On May 18, Mark Reynolds drove home Jason Kipnis in extra innings against the Seattle Mariners, who would have been out but Mariners catcher Jesus Montero didn't have his foot on home plate
- On May 19, the Indians defeated Félix Hernández and the Seattle Mariners, improving their record to 7–1 against former Cy Young Award winners (Dickey, Price, Halladay, Lee, Colón, Verlander, and Hernández. The only loss was to Peavy.) They became the first team in Major League history to defeat 7 former Cy Young winners before June.
- On June 28, the Indians defeated the Chicago White Sox 19–10, only the second time in franchise history (and the first since 1923) the team had scored at least 19 runs twice in one season.
- Also on June 28, the Indians and White Sox set the Major League record for longest double header without extra innings, with Game 1 lasting 4 hours, 2 minutes and Game 2 lasting 3 hours, 51 minutes, for a combined time of 7 hours, 53 minutes.
- On July 3, Jason Kipnis became the first Indians player to hit an inside-the-park home run since 2010.
- On July 6, Jason Kipnis and Justin Masterson were selected for the American League All-Star team. Kipnis was selected as a reserve second baseman, and Masterson as a pitcher. This is both players' first selection. Kipnis went 1–1 with an RBI double, while Masterson did not enter the game.
- On July 11, Danny Salazar become the fourth pitcher ever to defeat a reigning Cy Young winner (R. A. Dickey) in his Major League debut.
- On July 14, fan Greg Van Niel caught four foul balls at Progressive Field, the odds of which Ideal Seat (a foul ball tracking site) roughly estimated at 1,000,000,000,000 to 1.
- On July 29, the Indians set a franchise by scoring first in their 16th consecutive game.
- Also on July 29, Jason Giambi became the oldest player in Major League history to hit a walk-off home run, at 42 years and 202 days old.
- On July 30, Indians catcher Yan Gomes faced Chicago White Sox pitcher André Rienzo, marking the first time in Major League history that a Brazilian-born hitter faced a Brazilian-born pitcher.
- On September 24, Jason Giambi again became the oldest player in Major League history to hit a walk-off home run, at 42 years and 259 days.
- On November 13, Terry Francona was named the American League Manager of the Year.

== Post-season ==
=== American League Wild Card Game ===
Team	1	2	3	4	5	6	7	8	9	R	H	E
Tampa Bay Rays	0	0	1	2	0	0	0	0	1	4	8	0
Cleveland Indians	0	0	0	0	0	0	0	0	0	0	9	1
Starting pitchers: TB: Alex Cobb; CLE: Danny Salazar --> WP: Alex Cobb (1-0) LP: Danny Salazar (0-1); Home runs: TB: Delmon Young (1); CLE: None

== Farm system ==
Level	Team	League	Manager
AAA	Columbus Clippers	International League	Chris Tremie
AA	Akron Aeros	Eastern League	Edwin Rodríguez
A	Carolina Mudcats	Carolina League	David Wallace
A	Lake County Captains	Midwest League	Scooter Tucker
A-Short Season	Mahoning Valley Scrappers	New York–Penn League	Ted Kubiak
Rookie	AZL Indians	Arizona League	Tony Medrano
