= 2013 Detroit Tigers season =

Baseball season

2013 Detroit Tigers
- American League Central champions
- League: American League
- Division: Central
- Ballpark: Comerica Park
- City: Detroit, Michigan
- Record: 93–69 (.574)
- Divisional place: 1st
- Owners: Mike Ilitch
- General managers: Dave Dombrowski
- Managers: Jim Leyland
- Television: Fox Sports Detroit (Mario Impemba, Rod Allen)
- Radio: Detroit Tigers Radio Network (Dan Dickerson, Jim Price)
- Stats: ESPN.com; Baseball Reference

The 2013 Detroit Tigers season was the team's 113th season. They finished 93–69, first place in the American League (AL) Central Division. During the season, the Tigers finished one game ahead of the second place Cleveland Indians. They became the first Tigers team to win three consecutive titles since the 1907, 1908 and 1909 clubs won three consecutive American League pennants. The Tigers defeated the Oakland Athletics in five games in the American League Division Series and advanced to the ALCS for the third straight season, the first time an American League team has done so since the New York Yankees advanced to four straight from 1998 to 2001. They lost the American League Championship Series to the Boston Red Sox, four games to two. Manager Jim Leyland announced his retirement following the American League Championship Series.

Third baseman Miguel Cabrera was named the AL Most Valuable Player for the second consecutive year and starting pitcher Max Scherzer was named the AL Cy Young Award winner. Shortstop Jose Iglesias was runner-up to Wil Myers of the Tampa Bay Rays for the AL Rookie of the Year.

== Preseason ==
At the conclusion of the 2012 season, the Tigers extended manager Jim Leyland's contract for one season. and announced that Gene Lamont was moved from third base coach to bench coach. Lamont says the move was primarily for health and mobility reasons. Tom Brookens moved from first base coach to third base coach and Rafael Belliard took over as first base coach. The Tigers also hired veteran third base coach Jeff Cox as a baserunning consultant.

On November 14, 2012, The Tigers signed free agent outfielder Torii Hunter to a two-year, $26 million contract. Hunter was the new starting right fielder for the season. The Tigers also signed free agent catcher Brayan Peña to a one-year contract. They re-signed free agent pitcher Aníbal Sánchez to a five-year, $80 million contract.

The Tigers exercised the team options on infielder Jhonny Peralta and pitcher Octavio Dotel. They also avoided arbitration when they reached one-year deals with catcher Alex Avila, outfielders Brennan Boesch and Austin Jackson, and pitchers Phil Coke, Doug Fister, Rick Porcello and Max Scherzer. Previously released Don Kelly was signed to a minor league contract.

On March 28, the Tigers extended ace starting pitcher Justin Verlander's contract for another five seasons (in addition to his old contract, which had two seasons remaining on it) with a $180 million deal, meaning he will is under contract until at least 2019, with an option for 2020.

The Tigers did not re-sign outfielder Delmon Young, backup catcher Gerald Laird, or closer José Valverde, releasing them to free agency. However, the Tigers brought back Valverde on April 4 when they signed him to a minor league contract, and called him back up to the major league club on April 24. He was again designated for assignment to the Toledo Mud Hens on June 21. The Tigers unconditionally released Valverde on August 7.

The Tigers released utility player Ryan Raburn, and non-tendered pitcher Daniel Schlereth's contract, making him a free agent. Matt Hoffman was outrighted to Triple-A Toledo, and the contract of left-handed relief pitcher Adam Wilk was sold to the NC Dinos of the Korea Baseball Organization. They also released outfielder Brennan Boesch.

During the offseason, the Tigers traded starting pitcher Andrew Oliver to the Pittsburgh Pirates for catching prospect Ramón Cabrera. Cabrera was assigned to Class AAA Toledo. The Tigers also acquired two Rule 5 draft picks through separate trades. The club picked up second-baseman Jeff Kobernus from the Boston Red Sox in exchange for utility player Justin Henry, who had been assigned to Toledo. The Tigers also received left-handed pitcher Kyle Lobstein from the New York Mets in exchange for cash considerations. Kobernus was returned to the Nationals on March 23. The Tigers traded catcher Curt Casali to Tampa Bay in exchange for the rights to Rule 5 pitcher Kyle Lobstein, who was out-righted to Class AA Erie.

== Regular season ==
On April 26, Aníbal Sánchez struck out 17 Atlanta Braves' batters, breaking a franchise record previously set by Tigers' left-hander Mickey Lolich in 1972.

On May 5, Justin Verlander took a no-hitter into the 7th inning against the Houston Astros before it was broken up by Carlos Peña. It would have been the third of his career.

On May 19, Miguel Cabrera hit three home runs in a game for the second time in his career. He finished the game with four hits and five RBIs, but the Tigers still lost the game, 11–8, to the Texas Rangers.

On May 21, Max Scherzer retired 21 consecutive batters in a 5–1 victory over the Cleveland Indians. Scherzer allowed three baserunners in the first inning before retiring every hitter he faced over the next seven innings.

On May 24, in a game against the Minnesota Twins, Aníbal Sánchez was within two outs of his second career no-hitter, when it was broken up by Joe Mauer.

On June 1, the Tigers hit four home runs in the fourth inning of a game against the Baltimore Orioles. This was the first time the Tigers hit four homers in one inning since they last accomplished the feat on September 10, 1986. Víctor Martínez started the barrage with a solo shot down the right-field line; Jhonny Peralta followed with a long fly into the fourth row of the left-field bleachers before Alex Avila blasted one into the Orioles' bullpen. Miguel Cabrera would later join the fun with a grand slam, giving him 17 home runs and a Major league-leading 65 RBIs.

On June 20, Jhonny Peralta hit a walk-off two-run home run off closer Andrew Bailey to defeat the Boston Red Sox, 4–3. It was the team's first walk-off win of the season.

On June 28, after a 6–3 win against the Tampa Bay Rays, Max Scherzer became the first Tigers pitcher to ever start a season 12–0, surpassing the 11–0 start from George Mullin in 1909.

On July 3, after a 6–2 win over the Toronto Blue Jays, Max Scherzer became the first major league pitcher to start a season 13-0 since Roger Clemens in 1986.

The Tigers sent six players to the 2013 All-Star Game, giving them more representatives than any other major league team, and matching their most representatives since 1985. Miguel Cabrera was voted in as the starter at third base in the fan voting; Prince Fielder, Jhonny Peralta, Torii Hunter and Max Scherzer were selected as reserves in the player voting; Justin Verlander was added by manager Jim Leyland. The Tigers had a chance to send seven players to the All-Star Game this season, as Joaquín Benoit was one of the five finalists for the AL in the All-Star Final Vote, but Benoit was beaten out by pitcher Steve Delabar of the Toronto Blue Jays. On July 15, Scherzer was selected to start the game by his manager, Jim Leyland, who managed the AL squad this season.

On July 6, Torii Hunter fell a single shy of the cycle, hitting a triple, double and two-run home run to help the Tigers defeat the Cleveland Indians, 9–4.

On July 29, the Tigers traded outfield prospect Danry Vasquez and a player to be named later to the Houston Astros, in exchange for relief pitcher José Veras. To make room on the roster, pitcher Luke Putkonen was optioned to Triple-A Toledo.

On July 30, the Tigers traded outfielder Avisaíl García to the Chicago White Sox and pitcher Brayan Villarreal to the Boston Red Sox in a three-team deal to acquire infielder José Iglesias from the Red Sox.

On July 30, Alex Avila hit his first career grand slam against the Washington Nationals' ace Stephen Strasburg, leading the Tigers to a 5–1 victory.

On July 31, Torii Hunter fell a triple shy of the cycle, hitting a solo home run, single and double to help the Tigers defeat the Washington Nationals, 11–1.

On August 5, 2013, shortstop Jhonny Peralta was among 13 players suspended by Major League Baseball for his role in the Biogenesis performance-enhancing drug scandal. As a first-time offender of the league's drug policy, Peralta received a 50-game suspension.

On August 8, after a 10–3 win over the Cleveland Indians, Scherzer became the third pitcher in major league history to start a season 17–1, following Roger Clemens in 2001 and Don Newcombe in 1955.

On August 9, the Tigers' 12-game winning streak came to an end after an extra innings loss to the New York Yankees. The winning streak was tied for the second longest streak in club history.

On August 17, Miguel Cabrera hit a walk-off home run off Aaron Crow to defeat the Kansas City Royals, 6–5. This was Cabrera's major league leading thirteenth game-tying or go-ahead home run in the ninth inning or later in the last five seasons.

On August 18, Miguel Cabrera hit his 361st career home run, taking the number 77 spot on the career home runs list, tying Hall of Fame outfielder Joe DiMaggio. Cabrera became the third player since 1921 to have at least 40 home runs and 120 RBIs while batting .350 or better through 116 games, joining Hall of Fame members Babe Ruth and Jimmie Foxx.

On August 24, after a 3–0 win over the New York Mets, Scherzer became the third pitcher in major league history to start a season 19–1, following Roger Clemens in 2001 and Rube Marquard in 1912.

On August 25, with a win over the New York Mets, the Tigers became the first Major League team this year to have five pitchers with double-digit wins. The last time the Tigers had five pitchers (including starters and relievers) with double-digit wins was the 1984 World Series winning team, the last time the Tigers had five starting pitchers with double-digit wins was in 1949.

On September 6, the Tigers had a season high 26 hits in a 16–2 victory over the Kansas City Royals. The last time the Tigers had at least 26 hits in a game was on May 27, 2004, in a 17–7 victory over the Kansas City Royals. Oddly, the Tigers had lost their previous game to the Boston Red Sox by a 20–4 score. Thus, the Tigers became the first MLB team to lose a game by at least 14 runs and then win the next game by at least 14 runs since the 1922 St. Louis Browns.

On September 6, Omar Infante and Andy Dirks were both 5-for-5, the first time the Tigers had two players with five hits in the same game since 1917, when Hall of Famer Ty Cobb, Bobby Veach and Ossie Vitt all had five hits.

On September 20, after a 12–5 win over the Chicago White Sox, Scherzer became the first major league pitcher this year to reach 20 wins. Scherzer became the second Tiger's pitcher to reach 20 wins since Bill Gullickson in 1991, following Justin Verlander in 2011, and 45th in Tiger's history. Scherzer finished the regular season with 21 wins, the most in the major leagues.

On September 21, the Tigers defeated the Chicago White Sox, 7–6, after trailing 6–0 in the ninth inning. This marked the first time that a Tigers team won a game after trailing by at least six runs in the ninth since 1947, when they rallied from a 6–0 deficit for a 7–6 win over the Washington Senators.

The Detroit Tigers set the major league single-season strikeouts record with 1,428 strikeouts. The Tigers became just the third team in major league history to have three pitchers strike out 200-plus batters in a single season, following the 1969 Houston Astros and 1967 Minnesota Twins.

Miguel Cabrera finished the regular season with a .348 batting average, winning his third straight AL batting title. Cabrera became the first Tiger to win three consecutive batting titles since Ty Cobb from 1917 to 1919. With his 44 home runs, Cabrera became the third player in Tigers history to hit 40+ home runs in consecutive seasons, joining Hank Greenberg (1937–38) and Cecil Fielder (1990–91).

On November 12, Max Scherzer was named the American League Cy Young Award winner, receiving 28 of 30 first-place votes. Scherzer went 21–3 during the season, and was the major leagues' only 20-game winner. He also posted a 2.90 ERA, league-leading 0.97 WHIP, and 240 strikeouts.

On November 14, Miguel Cabrera won his second straight AL Most Valuable Player award, on the strength of a league-leading .348 batting average, 44 home runs and 139 RBIs. Cabrera also led the major leagues in on-base percentage (.442), slugging percentage (.636) and OPS (1.078). He received 23 of 30 first-place votes. Miguel is only the third Tiger player to win the MVP award more than once, joining Hank Greenberg (1935, 1940) and Hal Newhouser (1944–45).

== Postseason ==
On October 10, during Game 5 of the ALDS against the Oakland Athletics, Justin Verlander took a no-hitter into the seventh inning, before it was broken up by Yoenis Céspedes. Verlander finished with 10 strikeouts and one walk in a shutout to seal the series victory. In his career, Verlander has thrown 30 consecutive scoreless innings in the postseason against the Athletics, a major league record for a pitcher versus one team, surpassing Christy Mathewson's 28 scoreless innings against the Philadelphia Athletics from 1905 to 1911.

On October 12, during Game 1 of the ALCS against the Boston Red Sox, the Tigers were within two outs of a combined no-hitter, before it was broken up by Daniel Nava. The only other time a no-hitter was broken up in the ninth inning in postseason history was during the 1947 World Series.

On October 12, during Game 1 of the ALCS against the Boston Red Sox, Aníbal Sánchez became the first pitcher in Detroit Tigers history to strike out four batters in one inning. This was possible because Shane Victorino initially struck out after Jacoby Ellsbury did the same, but the ball got away from catcher Alex Avila, and Victorino advanced to first on a wild pitch. Sánchez later struck out David Ortiz and Mike Napoli. Sánchez became the second player in Major League history to strike out four batters in one inning during the postseason, following Orval Overall in the 1908 World Series.

On October 15, during Game 3 of the ALCS against the Boston Red Sox, Justin Verlander tied a postseason record by striking out six consecutive batters. Verlander finished the game with 10 strikeouts, marking the sixth time he has had at least 10 strikeouts in a postseason game, and setting a postseason record.

The Detroit Tigers set a franchise record by going 23 consecutive innings without allowing a run. The streak began in Game 5 of the ALDS against the Oakland Athletics, and continued until the sixth inning of Game 2 of the ALCS against the Boston Red Sox. The previous franchise record, set in 2006 and matched in 2011, was 20 consecutive scoreless innings.

The Detroit Tigers starting rotation set a Major League record for the most strikeouts in a postseason series with 55 strikeouts in the American League Championship Series. The previous record was 51, set by the Arizona Diamondbacks during the 2001 World Series. The Tigers pitching staff finished with a total of 73 strikeouts in the ALCS, a postseason record.

== Standings ==
=== American League Central ===
AL Central
Team	W	L	Pct.	GB	Home	Road
Detroit Tigers	93	69	.574	—	51‍–‍30	42‍–‍39
Cleveland Indians	92	70	.568	1	51‍–‍30	41‍–‍40
Kansas City Royals	86	76	.531	7	44‍–‍37	42‍–‍39
Minnesota Twins	66	96	.407	27	32‍–‍49	34‍–‍47
Chicago White Sox	63	99	.389	30	37‍–‍44	26‍–‍55

== Game log ==
=== Regular season ===
Legend
Tigers win	Tigers loss	Game postponed

2013 Game Log (93–69)
April (15–10)

#	Date	Opponent	Score	Win	Loss	Save	Attendance	Record
1	April 1	@ Twins	W 4–2	Verlander (1–0)	Worley (0–1)	Coke (1)	38,282	1–0
2	April 3	@ Twins	L 3–2	Perkins (1–0)	Coke (0–1)		22,963	1–1
3	April 4	@ Twins	L 8–2	Pelfrey (1–0)	Porcello (0–1)		24,752	1–2
4	April 5	Yankees	W 8–3	Fister (1–0)	Nova (0–1)	Smyly (1)	45,051	2–2
5	April 6	Yankees	W 8–4	Scherzer (1–0)	Hughes (0–1)		42,453	3–2
6	April 7	Yankees	L 7–0	Sabathia (1–1)	Verlander (1–1)		39,829	3–3
7	April 9	Blue Jays	W 7–3	Sánchez (1–0)	Morrow (0–1)		28,979	4–3
8	April 10	Blue Jays	L 8–6	Loup (1–0)	Villarreal (0–1)	Janssen (2)	29,631	4–4
9	April 11	Blue Jays	W 11–1	Fister (2–0)	Johnson (0–1)		28,781	5–4
10	April 12	@ Athletics	L 4–3 (12)	Resop (1–0)	Villarreal (0–2)		21,377	5–5
11	April 13	@ Athletics	W 7–3	Verlander (2–1)	Anderson (1–2)		35,067	6–5
12	April 14	@ Athletics	W 10–1	Sánchez (2–0)	Parker (0–2)		20,755	7–5
13	April 16	@ Mariners	W 6–2	Fister (3–0)	Harang (0–1)		12,379	8–5
14	April 17	@ Mariners	W 2–1 (14)	Smyly (1–0)	Furbush (0–1)	Benoit (1)	14,981	9–5
15	April 18	@ Mariners	L 2–0	Capps (1–1)	Verlander (2–2)	Wilhelmsen (6)	15,742	9–6
16	April 19	@ Angels	L 8–1	Hanson (2–1)	Sánchez (2–1)		39,023	9–7
17	April 20	@ Angels	L 10–0	Richards (1–0)	Porcello (0–2)		35,081	9–8
18	April 21	@ Angels	L 4–3 (13)	Williams (1–0)	Coke (0–2)		41,147	9–9
--	April 23	Royals	Postponed (rain). Rescheduled to August 16.					
19	April 24	Royals	W 7–5	Scherzer (2–0)	Davis (2–1)	Valverde (1)	30,347	10–9
20	April 25	Royals	L 8–3 (10)	Collins (1–0)	Coke (0–3)		30,321	10–10
21	April 26	Braves	W 10–0	Sánchez (3–1)	Maholm (3–2)		35,161	11–10
22	April 27	Braves	W 7–4	Porcello (1–2)	Medlen (1–3)	Valverde (2)	42,881	12–10
23	April 28	Braves	W 8–3	Fister (4–0)	Minor (3–2)		33,469	13–10
24	April 29	Twins	W 4–3	Scherzer (3–0)	Pelfrey (2–3)	Benoit (2)	29,878	14–10
25	April 30	Twins	W 6–1	Verlander (3–2)	Worley (0–4)		31,748	15–10

May (14–14)

#	Date	Opponent	Score	Win	Loss	Save	Attendance	Record
26	May 1	Twins	L 6–2	Diamond (2–2)	Sánchez (3–2)		36,028	15–11
27	May 2	@ Astros	W 7–3 (14)	Putkonen (1–0)	Keuchel (0–1)		16,624	16–11
28	May 3	@ Astros	W 4–3	Smyly (2–0)	Veras (0–2)	Valverde (3)	16,719	17–11
29	May 4	@ Astros	W 17–2	Scherzer (4–0)	Harrell (3–3)		21,266	18–11
30	May 5	@ Astros	W 9–0	Verlander (4–2)	Humber (0–7)		23,228	19–11
–	May 7	@ Nationals	Postponed (rain). Rescheduled to May 9.					
31	May 8	@ Nationals	L 3–1	Zimmermann (6–1)	Sánchez (3–3)	Soriano (11)	34,893	19–12
32	May 9	@ Nationals	L 5–4	Haren (4–3)	Fister (4–1)	Soriano (12)	28,742	19–13
33	May 10	Indians	W 10–4	Scherzer (5–0)	Kluber (2–2)		37,547	20–13
34	May 11	Indians	L 7–6	Jiménez (3–2)	Verlander (4–3)	Perez (6)	41,438	20–14
35	May 12	Indians	L 4–3 (10)	Smith (1–0)	Downs (0–1)	Allen (1)	35,260	20–15
36	May 13	Astros	W 7–2	Sánchez (4–3)	Norris (4–4)		31,161	21–15
37	May 14	Astros	W 6–2	Fister (5–1)	Harrell (3–4)		34,542	22–15
38	May 15	Astros	L 7–5	Ambriz (1–2)	Alburquerque (0–1)	Veras (5)	40,315	22–16
39	May 16	@ Rangers	L 10–4	Darvish (7–1)	Verlander (4–4)		39,778	22–17
40	May 17	@ Rangers	W 2–1	Porcello (2–2)	Tepesch (3–4)	Valverde (4)	42,778	23–17
41	May 18	@ Rangers	L 7–2	Grimm (3–3)	Sánchez (4–4)		46,782	23–18
42	May 19	@ Rangers	L 11–8	Ross (2–0)	Ortega (0–1)	Nathan (13)	39,638	23–19
43	May 21	@ Indians	W 5–1	Scherzer (6–0)	Kluber (3–3)		17,374	24–19
44	May 22	@ Indians	W 11–7	Verlander (5–4)	Jiménez (3–3)		16,562	25–19
45	May 23	Twins	W 7–6	Benoit (1–0)	Burton (0–2)	Valverde (5)	32,804	26–19
46	May 24	Twins	W 6–0	Sánchez (5–4)	Deduno (0–1)		39,789	27–19
47	May 25	Twins	L 3–2	Walters (1–0)	Fister (5–2)	Perkins (9)	41,927	27–20
48	May 26	Twins	W 6–1	Scherzer (7–0)	Pelfrey (3–5)		42,394	28–20
49	May 27	Pirates	W 6–5	Verlander (6–4)	Liriano (3–1)	Valverde (6)	41,416	29–20
50	May 28	Pirates	L 1–0 (11)	Melancon (1–0)	Ortega (0–2)	Grilli (21)	33,473	29–21
51	May 29	@ Pirates	L 5–3	Morris (2–2)	Sánchez (5–5)	Grilli (22)	19,980	29–22
52	May 30	@ Pirates	L 1–0	Morris (3–2)	Putkonen (1–1)		20,834	29–23
53	May 31	@ Orioles	L 7–5	O'Day (3–0)	Valverde (0–1)		46,429	29–24

June (14–13)

#	Date	Opponent	Score	Win	Loss	Save	Attendance	Record
54	June 1	@ Orioles	W 10–3	Verlander (7–4)	Hammel (7–3)		38,945	30–24
55	June 2	@ Orioles	L 4–2	Matusz (2–0)	Porcello (2–3)	Johnson (18)	39,182	30–25
56	June 4	Rays	W 10–1	Sánchez (6–5)	Moore (8–1)		30,569	31–25
57	June 5	Rays	L 3–0	Peralta (1–2)	Fister (5–3)	Rodney (12)	30,005	31–26
58	June 6	Rays	W 5–2	Scherzer (8–0)	Hernández (3–6)	Valverde (7)	36,168	32–26
59	June 7	Indians	W 7–5	Verlander (8–4)	Jiménez (4–4)		39,008	33–26
60	June 8	Indians	W 6–4	Porcello (3–3)	Carrasco (0–2)	Valverde (8)	41,691	34–26
61	June 9	Indians	W 4–1	Álvarez (1–0)	Masterson (8–5)	Benoit (3)	41,262	35–26
62	June 10	@ Royals	L 3–2	Guthrie (7–3)	Fister (5–4)	Holland (13)	17,653	35–27
63	June 11	@ Royals	W 3–2	Scherzer (9–0)	Crow (2–2)	Valverde (9)	16,493	36–27
64	June 12	@ Royals	L 3-2 (10)	Holland (2–1)	Coke (0–4)		24,564	36–28
65	June 14	@ Twins	W 4–0	Porcello (4–3)	Diamond (4–6)		29,571	37–28
66	June 15	@ Twins	L 6–3	Deduno (3–1)	Downs (0–2)	Perkins (16)	35,071	37–29
67	June 16	@ Twins	W 5–2	Fister (6–4)	Walters (2–2)	Benoit (4)	39,317	38–29
68	June 17	Orioles	W 5–1	Scherzer (10–0)	Arrieta (1–2)	Smyly (2)	32,525	39–29
69	June 18	Orioles	L 5–2	Britton (1–1)	Verlander (8–5)	Johnson (26)	34,706	39–30
70	June 19	Orioles	L 13–3	Tillman (8–2)	Porcello (4–4)		38,574	39–31
71	June 20	Red Sox	W 4–3	Smyly (3–0)	Bailey (3–1)		36,939	40–31
72	June 21	Red Sox	L 10–6	Lester (7–4)	Fister (6–5)		41,126	40–32
73	June 22	Red Sox	W 10–3	Scherzer (11–0)	Webster (0–2)		42,508	41–32
74	June 23	Red Sox	W 7–5	Benoit (2–0)	Miller (0–2)		41,507	42–32
75	June 25	Angels	L 14–8	Wilson (7–5)	Porcello (4–5)		34,204	42–33
76	June 26	Angels	L 7–4	De La Rosa (2–1)	Álvarez (1–1)	Frieri (18)	35,635	42–34
77	June 27	Angels	L 3–1 (10)	Jepsen (1–2)	Coke (0–5)	Frieri (19)	39,496	42–35
78	June 28	@ Rays	W 6–3	Scherzer (12–0)	Colomé (1–1)	Benoit (5)	17,645	43–35
79	June 29	@ Rays	L 4–3	Rodney (3–2)	Rondon (0–1)		23,809	43–36
80	June 30	@ Rays	L 3–1	Hellickson (7–3)	Porcello (4–6)	Rodney (17)	23,427	43–37

July (18–8)

#	Date	Opponent	Score	Win	Loss	Save	Attendance	Record
81	July 1	@ Blue Jays	L 8–3	Dickey (8–8)	Álvarez (1–2)		45,766	43–38
82	July 2	@ Blue Jays	W 7–6	Alburquerque (1–1)	Wagner (1–3)	Benoit (6)	27,189	44–38
83	July 3	@ Blue Jays	W 6–2	Scherzer (13–0)	Johnson (1–3)		28,958	45–38
84	July 4	@ Blue Jays	W 11–1	Verlander (9–5)	Rogers (3–4)		35,978	46–38
85	July 5	@ Indians	W 7–0	Porcello (5–6)	Masterson (10–7)		40,167	47–38
86	July 6	@ Indians	W 9–4	Sánchez (6–5)	Carrasco (0–4)		28,054	48–38
87	July 7	@ Indians	L 9–6	Allen (4–1)	Alburquerque (1–2)	Perez (9)	20,503	48–39
88	July 8	@ Indians	W 4–2 (10)	Smyly (4–0)	Albers (2–1)	Benoit (7)	23,640	49–39
89	July 9	White Sox	L 11–4	Quintana (4–2)	Verlander (9–6)		37,113	49–40
90	July 10	White Sox	W 8–5	Porcello (6–6)	Axelrod (3–6)	Benoit (8)	39,085	50–40
91	July 11	White Sox	L 6–3	Sale (6–8)	Sánchez (7–6)	Reed (23)	40,444	50–41
92	July 12	Rangers	W 7–2	Fister (7–5)	Grimm (7–7)		41,686	51–41
93	July 13	Rangers	L 7–1	Holland (8–4)	Scherzer (13–1)		44,061	51–42
94	July 14	Rangers	W 5–0	Verlander (10–6)	Pérez (3–2)		41,617	52–42
95	July 19	@ Royals	L 1–0	Santana (6–6)	Sánchez (7–7)	Holland (23)	35,000	52–43
96	July 20	@ Royals	L 6–5	Guthrie (9–7)	Verlander (10–7)	Holland (24)	30,116	52–44
97	July 21	@ Royals	W 4–1	Fister (8–5)	Shields (4–7)	Benoit (9)	20,513	53–44
98	July 22	@ White Sox	W 7–3	Scherzer (14–1)	Sale (6–9)		23,195	54–44
99	July 23	@ White Sox	W 6–2	Porcello (7–6)	Santiago (3–6)		25,919	55–44
100	July 24	@ White Sox	W 6–2	Sánchez (8–7)	Danks (2–8)		26,793	56–44
101	July 25	@ White Sox	L 7–4	Peavy (8–4)	Verlander (10–8)	Reed (26)	30,348	56–45
102	July 26	Phillies	W 2–1	Fister (9–5)	Hamels (4–13)	Benoit (10)	42,317	57–45
103	July 27	Phillies	W 10–0	Scherzer (15–1)	Valdés (1–1)		41,970	58–45
104	July 28	Phillies	W 12–4	Porcello (8–6)	Diekman (0–1)		41,326	59–45
105	July 30	Nationals	W 5–1	Sánchez (9–7)	Strasburg (5–9)		41,880	60–45
106	July 31	Nationals	W 11–1	Verlander (11–8)	Gonzalez (7–4)		40,894	61–45

August (19–11)

#	Date	Opponent	Score	Win	Loss	Save	Attendance	Record
107	August 2	White Sox	W 2–1	Fister (10–5)	Santiago (3–7)	Benoit (11)	41,109	62–45
108	August 3	White Sox	W 3–0	Scherzer (16–1)	Danks (2–9)	Benoit (12)	43,906	63–45
109	August 4	White Sox	W 3–2 (12)	Rondón (1–1)	Axelrod (3–8)		42,513	64–45
110	August 5	@ Indians	W 4–2	Alburquerque (2–2)	Perez (4–2)	Benoit (13)	24,381	65–45
111	August 6	@ Indians	W 5–1	Verlander (12–8)	Masterson (13–8)		24,676	66–45
112	August 7	@ Indians	W 6–5 (14)	Bonderman (2–3)	Shaw (2–3)	Benoit (14)	20,169	67–45
113	August 8	@ Indians	W 10–3	Scherzer (17–1)	McAllister (4–7)		25,131	68–45
114	August 9	@ Yankees	L 4–3 (10)	Kelley (4–1)	Alburquerque (2–3)		46,545	68–46
115	August 10	@ Yankees	W 9–3	Sánchez (10–7)	Hughes (4–11)		45,728	69–46
116	August 11	@ Yankees	L 5–4	Rivera (3–2)	Veras (0–5)		42,439	69–47
117	August 12	@ White Sox	L 6–2	Sale (8–11)	Fister (10–6)		19,590	69–48
118	August 13	@ White Sox	L 4–3 (11)	Reed (5–1)	Bonderman (2–4)		22,292	69–49
119	August 14	@ White Sox	W 6–4	Porcello (9–6)	Danks (2–10)	Benoit (15)	20,058	70–49
120	August 15	Royals	W 4–1	Sánchez (11–7)	Guthrie (12–9)	Benoit (16)	37,872	71–49
121	August 16	Royals	L 2–1	Duffy (1–0)	Verlander (12–9)	Holland (33)	38,714	71–50
122	August 16	Royals	L 3–0	Shields (8–8)	Álvarez (1–3)	Holland (34)	40,980	71–51
123	August 17	Royals	W 6–5	Benoit (3–0)	Crow (7–4)		41,850	72–51
124	August 18	Royals	W 6–3	Scherzer (18–1)	Chen (5–1)		41,740	73–51
125	August 20	Twins	L 6–3	Pelfrey (5–10)	Porcello (9–7)	Perkins (29)	37,964	73–52
126	August 21	Twins	W 7–1	Smyly (5–0)	Correia (8–10)	Veras (20)	38,092	74–52
127	August 22	Twins	L 7–6	Fien (3–2)	Rondón (1–2)	Perkins (30)	39,653	74–53
128	August 23	@ Mets	W 6–1	Fister (11–6)	Matsuzaka (0–1)		37,023	75–53
129	August 24	@ Mets	W 3–0	Scherzer (19–1)	Harvey (9–5)	Benoit (17)	35,636	76–53
130	August 25	@ Mets	W 11–3	Porcello (10–7)	Gee (9–9)		32,084	77–53
131	August 26	Athletics	L 8–6	Griffin (11–9)	Álvarez (1–4)	Balfour (33)	34,778	77–54
132	August 27	Athletics	L 6–3 (6)	Milone (10–9)	Verlander (12–10)		34,356	77–55
133	August 28	Athletics	L 14–4	Straily (7–7)	Fister (11–7)	Anderson (1)	31,973	77–56
134	August 29	Athletics	W 7–6	Benoit (4–0)	Balfour (0–3)		39,212	78–56
135	August 30	Indians	W 7–2 (7)	Porcello (11–7)	McAllister (7–8)	Rondón (1)	37,067	79–56
136	August 31	Indians	W 10–5	Sánchez (12–7)	Kazmir (7–7)		41,272	80–56

September (13–13)

#	Date	Opponent	Score	Win	Loss	Save	Attendance	Record
137	September 1	Indians	L 4–0	Smith (6–2)	Benoit (4–1)		41,557	80–57
138	September 2	@ Red Sox	W 3–0	Fister (12–7)	Lackey (8–12)	Veras (21)	36,188	81–57
139	September 3	@ Red Sox	L 2–1	Lester (13–8)	Scherzer (19–2)	Uehara (17)	32,071	81–58
140	September 4	@ Red Sox	L 20–4	Dempster (8–9)	Porcello (11–8)		33,720	81–59
141	September 6	@ Royals	W 16–2	Sánchez (13–7)	Shields (10–9)		21,358	82–59
142	September 7	@ Royals	L 4–3	Davis (7–10)	Verlander (12–11)	Holland (39)	20,402	82–60
143	September 8	@ Royals	L 5–2	Chen (7–2)	Fister (12–8)	Holland (40)	16,774	82–61
144	September 9	@ White Sox	L 5–1	Sale (11–12)	Scherzer (19–3)		17,193	82–62
145	September 10	@ White Sox	W 9–1	Porcello (12–8)	Johnson (0–2)		19,172	83–62
146	September 11	@ White Sox	W 1–0	Sánchez (14–7)	Lindstrom (2–4)	Benoit (18)	15,799	84–62
147	September 13	Royals	W 6–3	Verlander (13–11)	Chen (7–3)	Benoit (19)	40,389	85–62
148	September 14	Royals	L 1–0	Santana (9–9)	Fister (12–9)	Holland (43)	41,841	85–63
149	September 15	Royals	W 3–2	Smyly (6–0)	Guthrie (14–11)	Benoit (20)	40,491	86–63
150	September 16	Mariners	W 4–2	Porcello (13–8)	Saunders (11–15)	Benoit (21)	34,063	87–63
151	September 17	Mariners	W 6–2	Alburquerque (3–3)	Medina (4–6)		39,076	88–63
152	September 18	Mariners	L 8–0	Iwakuma (13–6)	Verlander (13–12)		36,395	88–64
153	September 19	Mariners	W 5–4	Fister (13–9)	Furbush (2–6)	Benoit (22)	38,341	89–64
154	September 20	White Sox	W 12–5	Scherzer (20–3)	Axelrod (4–10)		39,643	90–64
155	September 21	White Sox	W 7–6 (12)	Alburquerque (4–3)	Petricka (1–1)		41,772	91–64
156	September 22	White Sox	L 6–3	Johnson (2–2)	Sánchez (14–8)		41,749	91–65
157	September 23	@ Twins	L 4–3 (11)	Swarzak (3–2)	Putkonen (1–1)		24,647	91–66
158	September 24	@ Twins	W 4–2	Fister (14–9)	Diamond (6–12)	Benoit (23)	25,541	92–66
159	September 25	@ Twins	W 1–0	Scherzer (21–3)	Correia (9–13)	Benoit (24)	26,517	93–66
160	September 27	@ Marlins	L 3–2	Koehler (5–10)	Álvarez (1–5)	Cishek (34)	26,992	93–67
161	September 28	@ Marlins	L 2–1 (10)	Cishek (4–6)	Reed (0–1)		28,750	93–68
162	September 29	@ Marlins	L 1–0	Álvarez (5–6)	Putkonen (1–3)		28,315	93–69

=== Postseason ===
==== American League Division Series ====
American League Division Series vs Oakland Athletics (Tigers win series 3–2)

#	Date	Opponent	Score	Win	Loss	Save	Attendance	Record
1	October 4	@ Athletics	W 3–2	Scherzer (1–0)	Colón (0–1)	Benoit (1)	48,401	1–0
2	October 5	@ Athletics	L 1–0	Balfour (1–0)	Alburquerque (0–1)		48,292	1–1
3	October 7	Athletics	L 6–3	Parker (1–0)	Sánchez (0–1)	Balfour (1)	43,973	1–2
4	October 8	Athletics	W 8–6	Scherzer (2–0)	Doolittle (0–1)		43,958	2–2
5	October 10	@ Athletics	W 3–0	Verlander (1–0)	Gray (0–1)	Benoit (2)	46,959	3–2

==== American League Championship Series ====
American League Championship Series vs Boston Red Sox (Red Sox win series 4–2)

#	Date	Opponent	Score	Win	Loss	Save	Attendance	Record
1	October 12	@ Red Sox	W 1–0	Sánchez (1–0)	Lester (0–1)	Benoit (1)	38,210	1–0
2	October 13	@ Red Sox	L 6–5	Uehara (1–0)	Porcello (0–1)		38,029	1–1
3	October 15	Red Sox	L 1–0	Lackey (1–0)	Verlander (0–1)	Uehara (1)	42,327	1–2
4	October 16	Red Sox	W 7–3	Fister (1–0)	Peavy (0–1)		42,765	2–2
5	October 17	Red Sox	L 4–3	Lester (1–1)	Sánchez (1–1)	Uehara (2)	42,669	2–3
6	October 19	@ Red Sox	L 5–2	Tazawa (1–0)	Scherzer (0–1)	Uehara (3)	38,823	2–4

== Detailed records ==
American League
Opponent	Home	Away	Total	Pct.	Runs scored	Runs allowed
AL East
Baltimore Orioles	1–2	1–2	2–4	.333	27	33
Boston Red Sox	3–1	1–2	4–3	.571	35	43
New York Yankees	2–1	1–2	3-3	.500	32	26
Tampa Bay Rays	2–1	1–2	3–3	.500	25	16
Toronto Blue Jays	2–1	3–1	5–2	.714	51	29
	10–6	7–9	17–15	.531	170	149
AL Central
Chicago White Sox	6–3	6–4	12–7	.632	90	77
Cleveland Indians	6–3	9–1	15–4	.789	120	70
Detroit Tigers	–	–	–	–	–	–
Kansas City Royals	6–5	3–6	9–10	.474	73	60
Minnesota Twins	6–4	5–4	11–8	.579	78	60
	24–14	23–15	47–29	.618	357	260
AL West
Houston Astros	2–1	4–0	6–1	.857	55	19
Los Angeles Angels	0–3	0–3	0–6	.000	17	46
Oakland Athletics	1–3	2–1	3–4	.429	40	42
Seattle Mariners	3–1	2–1	5–2	.714	23	21
Texas Rangers	2–1	1–3	3–4	.429	29	38
	8–9	9–8	17–17	.500	163	160

National League
Opponent	Home	Away	Total	Pct.	Runs scored	Runs allowed
Atlanta Braves	3–0	0–0	3–0	1.000	25	7
Miami Marlins	0–0	0–3	0–3	.000	3	6
New York Mets	0–0	3–0	3–0	1.000	20	4
Philadelphia Phillies	3–0	0–0	3–0	1.000	24	4
Pittsburgh Pirates	1–1	0–2	1–3	.250	9	12
Washington Nationals	2–0	0–2	2–2	.500	21	10
	9–1	3–7	12–8	.600	102	43

=== Roster ===
2013 Detroit Tigers
Roster
Pitchers: 62 Al Alburquerque; 52 José Álvarez; 53 Joaquín Benoit; 38 Jeremy Bonderman; 40 Phil Coke; 20 Octavio Dotel; 38,34 Darin Downs; 58 Doug Fister; 56 José Ortega; 21 Rick Porcello; 36 Luke Putkonen; 57 Evan Reed; 43 Bruce Rondón; 19 Aníbal Sánchez; 37 Max Scherzer; 33 Drew Smyly; 46 José Valverde; 31 José Veras; 35 Justin Verlander; 60 Brayan Villarreal	Catchers: 13 Alex Avila; 50 Bryan Holaday; 55 Brayan Peña; Infielders: 24 Miguel Cabrera; 28 Prince Fielder; 1 José Iglesias; 4 Omar Infante; 41 Víctor Martínez; 27 Jhonny Peralta; 26 Hernán Pérez; 39 Ramón Santiago; 29 Danny Worth; Outfielders: 30 Nick Castellanos; 12 Andy Dirks; 34 Avisaíl García; 48 Torii Hunter; 14 Austin Jackson; 32 Don Kelly; 18 Matt Tuiasosopo	Manager: 10 Jim Leyland; Coaches: 17 Rafael Belliard (first base); 61 Tom Brookens (third base); 87 Toby Harrah (assistant hitting); 51 Jeff Jones (pitching); 97 Jeff Kunkel (bullpen catcher); 22 Gene Lamont (bench); 8 Lloyd McClendon (hitting); 99 Scott Pickens (bullpen catcher); 59 Mike Rojas (bullpen)

=== Player stats ===
==== Batting ====
Note: G = Games played; AB = At bats; R = Runs scored; H = Hits; 2B = Doubles; 3B = Triples; HR = Home runs; RBI = Runs batted in; AVG = Batting average; SB = Stolen bases

Player	G	AB	R	H	2B	3B	HR	RBI	AVG	SB
Alex Avila	102	330	39	75	14	1	11	47	.227	0
Miguel Cabrera	148	555	103	193	26	1	44	137	.348	3
Nick Castellanos	11	18	1	5	0	0	0	0	.278	0
Andy Dirks	131	438	60	112	16	2	9	37	.256	7
Prince Fielder	162	624	82	174	36	0	25	106	.279	1
Avisaíl García	30	83	12	20	3	1	2	10	.241	0
Bryan Holaday	16	27	8	8	1	0	1	2	.296	0
Torii Hunter	144	606	90	184	37	5	17	83	.304	3
José Iglesias+	46	148	12	35	6	0	2	10	.259	2
Omar Infante	118	453	54	144	24	3	10	51	.318	5
Austin Jackson	129	552	99	150	30	7	12	49	.272	8
Don Kelly	112	216	33	48	6	1	6	23	.222	2
Victor Martínez	159	605	68	182	36	0	14	83	.301	0
Brayan Peña	71	229	19	68	11	0	4	22	.297	0
Jhonny Peralta	107	409	50	124	30	0	11	55	.303	3
Hernán Pérez	34	66	13	13	0	1	0	5	.197	1
Ramón Santiago	80	205	27	46	8	1	1	14	.224	0
Matt Tuiasosopo	81	164	26	40	7	0	7	30	.244	0
Danny Worth	3	2	0	0	0	0	0	0	.000	0
Pitcher Totals	162	18	0	4	1	0	0	2	.222	0
Team totals	162	5735	796	1625	292	23	176	767	.283	35

+Totals with Tigers only.

==== Starters ====
Note: W = Wins; L = Losses; ERA = Earned run average; G = Games pitched; GS = Games started; SV = Saves; IP = Innings pitched; R = Runs allowed; ER = Earned runs allowed; BB = Walks allowed; K = Strikeouts

Player	W	L	ERA	G	GS	SV	IP	R	ER	BB	K
Doug Fister	14	9	3.67	33	32	0	208 2/3	91	85	44	159
Rick Porcello	13	8	4.32	32	29	0	177	87	85	42	142
Aníbal Sánchez	14	8	2.57	29	29	0	182	56	52	54	202
Max Scherzer	21	3	2.90	32	32	0	214 1/3	73	69	56	240
Justin Verlander	13	12	3.46	34	34	0	218 1/3	94	84	75	217

==== Bullpen ====
Note: W = Wins; L = Losses; ERA = Earned run average; G = Games pitched; GS = Games started; SV = Saves; IP = Innings pitched; R = Runs allowed; ER = Earned runs allowed; BB = Walks allowed; K = Strikeouts

Player	W	L	ERA	G	GS	SV	IP	R	ER	BB	K
Al Alburquerque	4	3	4.59	53	0	0	49	25	25	34	70
José Álvarez	1	5	5.82	14	6	0	38 2/3	26	25	16	31
Joaquín Benoit	4	1	2.01	66	0	24	67	15	15	22	73
Jeremy Bonderman+	1	1	6.48	11	0	0	16 2/3	13	12	10	16
Phil Coke	0	5	5.40	49	0	1	38 1/3	24	23	21	30
Octavio Dotel	0	0	13.50	6	0	0	4 2/3	7	7	4	4
Darin Downs	0	2	4.84	29	0	0	35 1/3	20	19	11	37
José Ortega	0	2	3.86	11	0	0	11 2/3	5	5	6	10
Luke Putkonen	1	3	3.03	30	0	0	29 2/3	11	10	9	28
Evan Reed	0	1	4.24	16	0	0	23 1/3	16	11	8	17
Bruce Rondón	1	2	3.45	30	0	1	28 2/3	11	11	11	30
Drew Smyly	6	0	2.37	63	0	2	76	20	20	17	81
José Valverde	0	1	5.59	20	0	9	19 1/3	12	12	6	19
José Veras+	0	1	3.20	25	0	2	19 2/3	8	7	8	16
Brayan Villarreal	0	2	20.77	7	0	0	4 1/3	10	10	8	6
Team Pitching Totals	93	69	3.61	162	162	39	1462 2/3	624	587	462	1428

+Totals with Tigers only.

== Farm system ==
Level	Team	League	Manager
AAA	Toledo Mud Hens	International League	Phil Nevin
AA	Erie SeaWolves	Eastern League	Chris Cron
A	Lakeland Flying Tigers	Florida State League	Dave Huppert
A	West Michigan Whitecaps	Midwest League	Larry Parrish
A-Short Season	Connecticut Tigers	New York–Penn League	Andrew Graham
Rookie	GCL Tigers	Gulf Coast League	Basilio Cabrera
