= Matt Langwell =

American baseball player (born 1986)

- Pitcher
- Born: May 6, 1986 (age 40); Bryan, Texas, U.S.
- Batted: Right Threw: Right

MLB debut
- June 2, 2013, for the Cleveland Indians

Last MLB appearance
- September 27, 2013, for the Arizona Diamondbacks

MLB statistics
- Win–loss record: 1–0
- Earned run average: 5.14
- Strikeouts: 12
- Stats at Baseball Reference

Teams
- Cleveland Indians (2013); Arizona Diamondbacks (2013)

Matthew August Langwell (born May 6, 1986) is an American former professional baseball pitcher. He played in Major League Baseball (MLB) in 2013 for the Cleveland Indians and Arizona Diamondbacks.

== Amateur career ==
Langwell attended Rice University. In 2007, he played collegiate summer baseball with the Wareham Gatemen of the Cape Cod Baseball League.

== Professional career ==
=== Cleveland Indians ===
Langwell was drafted by the Cleveland Indians in the 11th round, with the 351st overall selection, of the 2008 Major League Baseball draft. He made his professional debut with the Low-A Mahoning Valley Scrappers, struggling to a 7.47 ERA in 12 games. Langwell spent the 2009 campaign with the Single-A Lake County Captains. In 45 appearances out of the bullpen, he registered a 1-4 record and 1.97 ERA with 68 strikeouts across 68 2/3 innings pitched. In 2010, Langwell made 45 appearances for the High-A Kinston Indians, logging a 4-2 record and 2.41 ERA with 58 strikeouts and 5 saves.

Langwell split the 2011 season between the Double-A Akron Aeros and Triple-A Columbus Clippers. In 48 games for the two affiliates, he accumulated a 5-1 record and 3.01 ERA with 71 strikeouts across 68 2/3 innings pitched. Langwell returned to the two affiliates in 2012, registering a combined 4-0 record and 2.74 ERA with 81 strikeouts and 3 saves over 42 games.

On June 1, 2013, Langwell was selected to the 40-man roster and promoted to the major leagues for the first time. He was optioned back to the Triple-A Columbus Clippers on June 18. In 5 games for Cleveland during his rookie campaign, Langwell posted a 1-0 record and 5.06 ERA with 6 strikeouts across 5 1/3 innings pitched.

=== Arizona Diamondbacks ===
On September 1, 2013, Langwell was traded to the Arizona Diamondbacks as the player to be named later in the August 30 trade that saw Cleveland acquire Jason Kubel. In 8 appearances for the Diamondbacks, he posted a 5.19 ERA with 6 strikeouts across 8 2/3 innings pitched. On October 3, Langwell was removed from the 40-man roster and sent outright to the Triple-A Reno Aces. He was released by the Diamondbacks organization prior to the start of the season on March 17, 2014.

=== Lancaster Barnstormers ===
On April 30, 2014, Langwell signed with the Lancaster Barnstormers of the Atlantic League of Professional Baseball. In 14 starts for Lancaster, he compiled a 5-6 record and 3.42 ERA with 61 strikeouts across 79 innings pitched. Langwell became a free agent following the season.
