= Luke Putkonen =

American baseball player (born 1986)

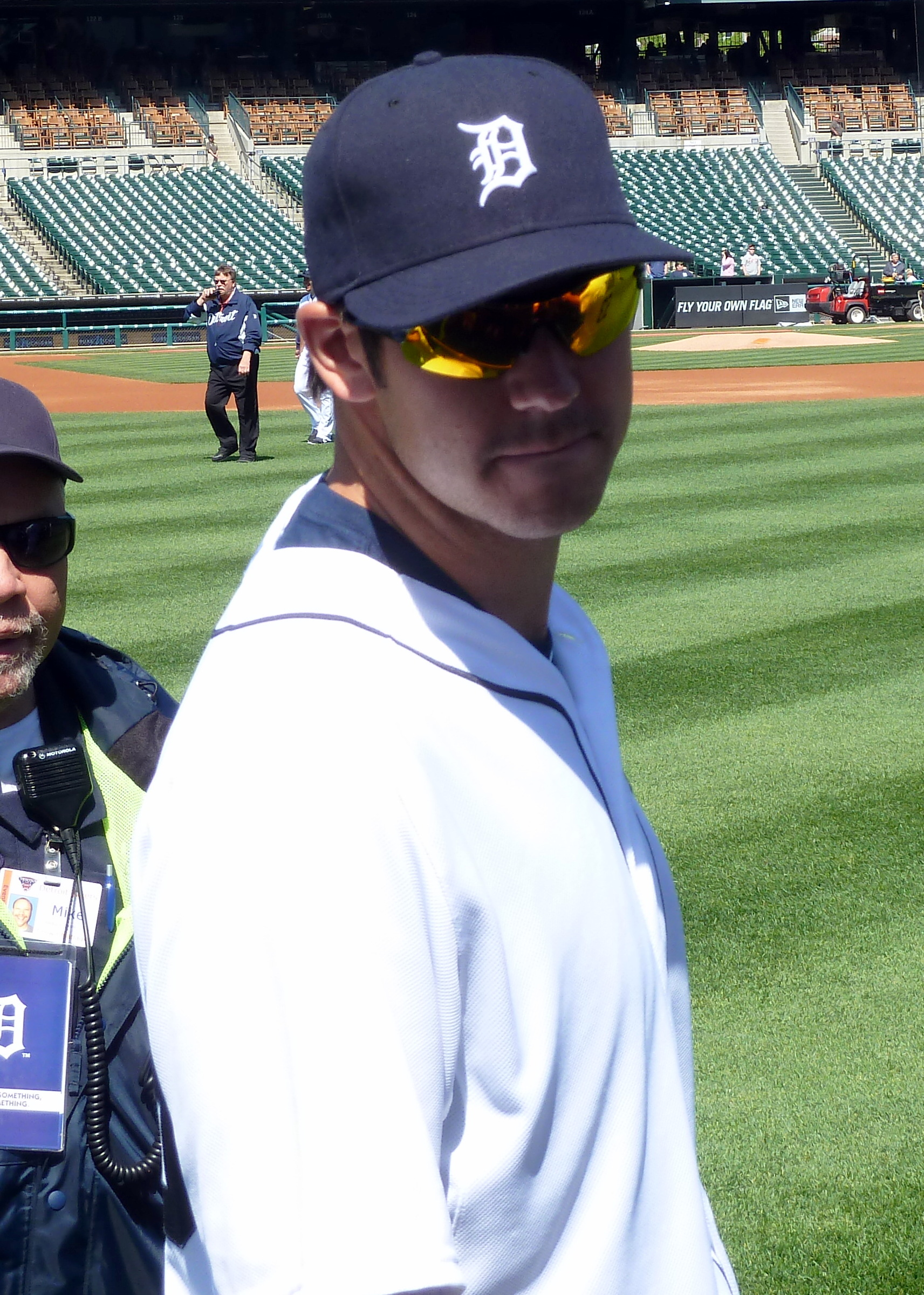
- Putkonen with the Detroit Tigers
- Pitcher
- Born: May 10, 1986 (age 40); Winfield, Illinois, U.S.
- Batted: Right Threw: Right

MLB debut
- April 29, 2012, for the Detroit Tigers

Last MLB appearance
- April 18, 2014, for the Detroit Tigers

MLB statistics
- Win–loss record: 1–5
- Earned run average: 4.66
- Strikeouts: 39
- Stats at Baseball Reference

Teams
- Detroit Tigers (2012–2014)

Luke Webber Putkonen (born May 10, 1986) is an American former Major League Baseball (MLB) pitcher who played for the Detroit Tigers from 2012 to 2014. Prior to playing professionally, Putkonen played college baseball for the North Carolina Tar Heels.

== High school and college ==
Putkonen attended Walton High School in Marietta, Georgia. He then enrolled at the University of North Carolina at Chapel Hill, where he played college baseball for the North Carolina Tar Heels baseball team. In 2006, he played collegiate summer baseball with the Wareham Gatemen of the Cape Cod Baseball League.

== Professional career ==
The Detroit Tigers drafted Putkonen in the third round (121st overall) of the 2007 MLB draft. He was promoted to the MLB roster for the first time on April 26, 2012.

Putkonen made his Major League debut on April 29, 2012, in a relief appearance against the New York Yankees. On May 25, Putkonen was optioned back to Triple-A to make room for Luis Marte, who was activated off the 15-day DL. Putkonen was 0–2 with an 8.59 ERA in 7 1/3 innings in six games.

Putkonen was ejected for the first time in his MLB career on July 11, 2013, after throwing a first-pitch sinker high and inside to Chicago White Sox batter Alexei Ramírez immediately following a Josh Phegley grand slam. Putkonen was optioned to Triple-A Toledo Mud Hens on July 31, and later recalled back to the Major League on August 28. Putkonen finished the 2013 season 1–3 with a 3.03 ERA in 30 relief appearances.

On June 13, 2014, Putkonen underwent surgery to shave down a bone spur on his right elbow, and it was announced he would be out for at least 6–8 weeks. On August 28, it was announced Putkonen would begin a minor league rehab assignment with the Single-A West Michigan Whitecaps. He was designated for assignment by the Tigers on January 6, 2015, and sent outright to Toledo on January 15. Putkonen was released by the Tigers on March 28.In four appearances during spring training he posted a 7.36 ERA in 3 1/3 innings, giving up three runs, four hits and three walks. On April 23, the Tigers re-signed Putkonen to a minor league contract. Putkonen was released again by the Tigers on June 4. Prior to being released, Putkonen was struggled to a 32.40 ERA in 1 2/3 innings for Toledo, allowing six hits and six earned runs in two games.

== Scouting report ==
Putkonen throws four pitches. He has a four-seam fastball and two-seam fastball at 92–95 mph with good tailing action, a changeup in the mid 80s, and a good curveball in the upper 70s. His four-seamer and curveball are used against right-handers, and his two-seamer and changeup are used against left-handers.
