= Scott Barnes (baseball) =

American baseball pitcher (born 1987)

- Pitcher
- Born: September 5, 1987 (age 38); Springfield, Massachusetts, U.S.
- Batted: Left Threw: Left

MLB debut
- May 30, 2012, for the Cleveland Indians

Last MLB appearance
- May 31, 2013, for the Cleveland Indians

MLB statistics
- Win–loss record: 0–1
- Earned run average: 5.20
- Strikeouts: 26
- Stats at Baseball Reference

Teams
- Cleveland Indians (2012–2013)

Scott Michael Barnes (born September 5, 1987), is an American former professional baseball pitcher. He played in Major League Baseball (MLB) for the Cleveland Indians.

== Amateur career ==
Barnes attended Cathedral High School in Springfield, Massachusetts, and St. John's University in New York City before being drafted by the San Francisco Giants.

In 2007 while at St. John's, Barnes was named to the first team all-Big East Conference team. After the 2007 season, he played collegiate summer baseball with the Harwich Mariners of the Cape Cod Baseball League.

== Professional career ==
=== Cleveland Indians ===
In July 2009, the Giants traded Barnes to the Cleveland Indians for Ryan Garko.

In 2009, Barnes helped the Akron Aeros win the 2009 Eastern League Championship Series.

The Indians purchased Barnes' contract on November 18, 2011. Barnes was recalled by the Indians on May 30, 2012; he made his major-league debut that evening.

=== Baltimore Orioles ===
On November 26, 2014, Barnes was traded to the Baltimore Orioles for cash considerations.

=== Toronto Blue Jays ===
The Texas Rangers claimed Barnes off waivers on December 8, 2015. The Rangers designated him for assignment on December 16, and he was claimed by the Toronto Blue Jays on December 23. The Blue Jays outrighted Barnes to the Buffalo Bisons of the Triple–A International League on March 27, 2015. In 30 appearances for the Double–A New Hampshire Fisher Cats, he logged a 2–6 record and 5.59 ERA with 49 strikeouts across 58 innings of work. Barnes elected free agency following the season on November 6.

=== Chicago Cubs ===
On December 23, 2015, Barnes signed a minor league deal with the Chicago Cubs organization. Barnes spent 2016 with the Triple–A Iowa Cubs where he posted a 1–3 record and 7.02 ERA with 18 strikeouts over 16 2/3 innings. He elected free agency following the season on November 7, 2016.

=== Chicago Dogs ===
On May 9, 2018, Barnes signed with the Chicago Dogs of the American Association of Independent Professional Baseball. He was released on August 29.
