= Chris Perez (baseball) =

American baseball player (born 1985)

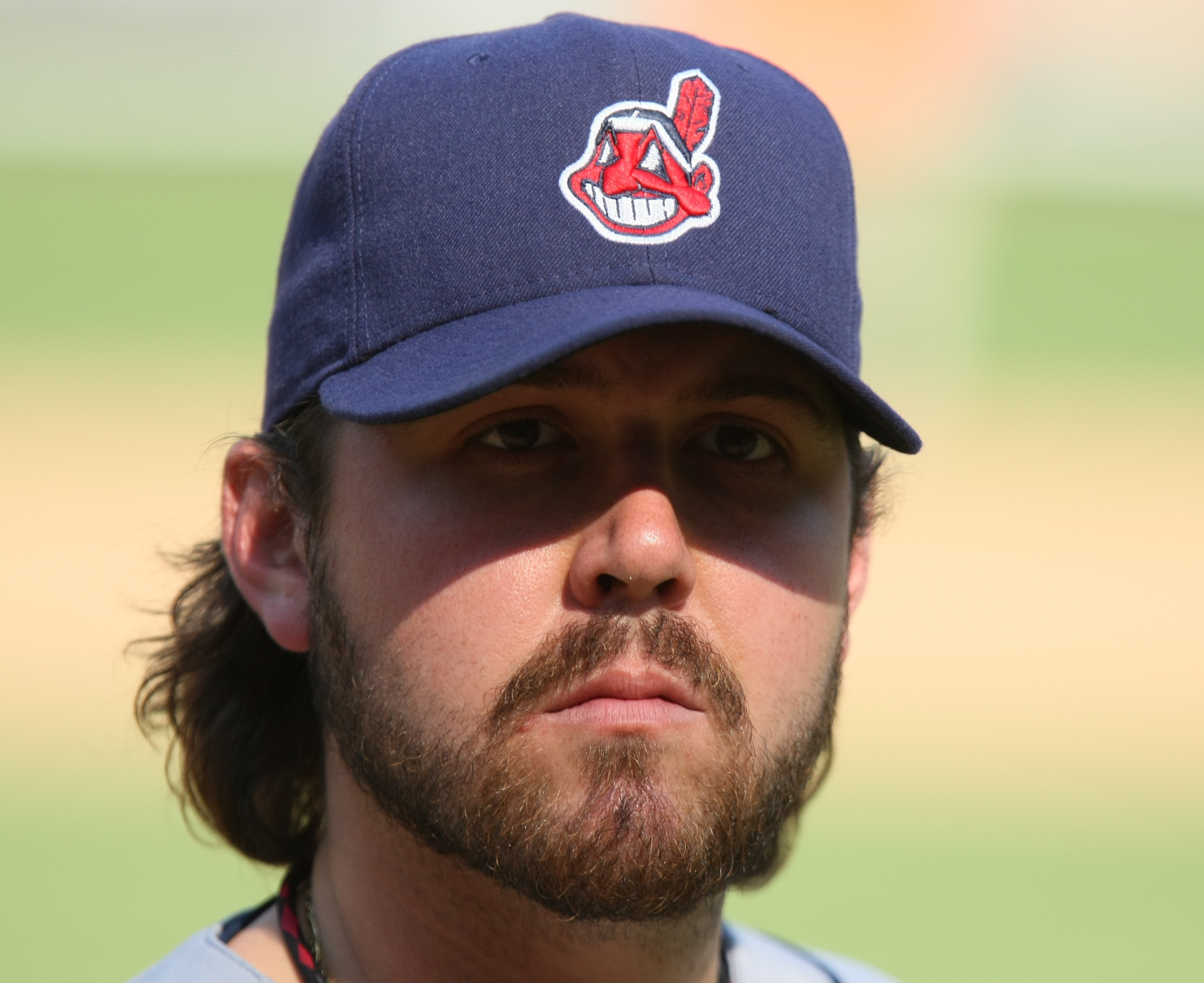
- Perez with the Cleveland Indians in 2009
- Pitcher
- Born: July 1, 1985 (age 41); Bradenton, Florida, U.S.
- Batted: Right Threw: Right

MLB debut
- May 16, 2008, for the St. Louis Cardinals

Last MLB appearance
- September 21, 2014, for the Los Angeles Dodgers

MLB statistics
- Win–loss record: 16–24
- Earned run average: 3.51
- Strikeouts: 362
- Saves: 133
- Stats at Baseball Reference

Teams
- St. Louis Cardinals (2008–2009); Cleveland Indians (2009–2013); Los Angeles Dodgers (2014)

Career highlights and awards
- 2× All-Star (2011, 2012)
Medals
Men's baseball
Representing United States
Baseball World Cup
Gold medal – first place	2007 Tianmu	National team

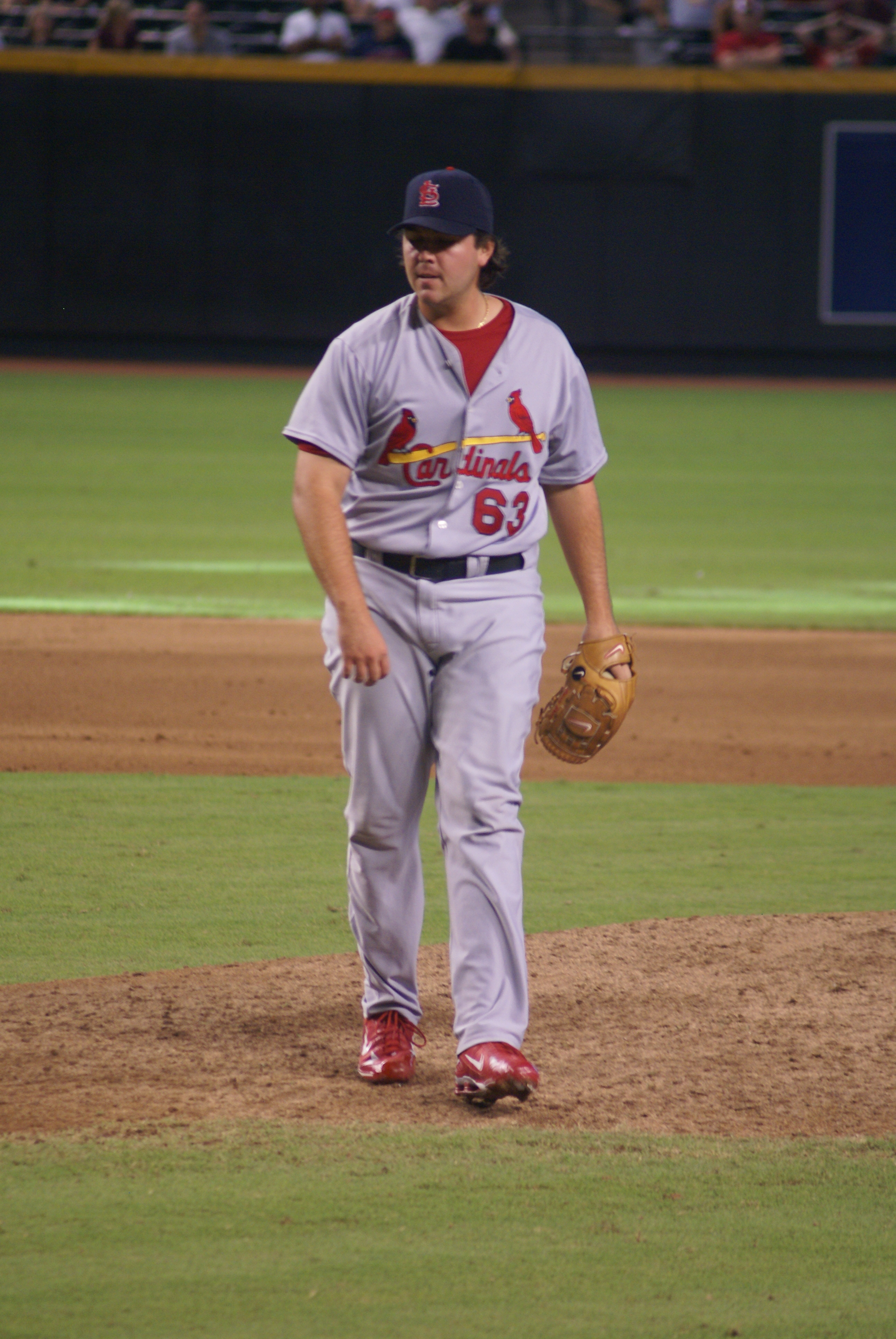
Perez with the St. Louis Cardinals in 2008

Christopher Ralph Perez (born July 1, 1985) is an American former professional baseball pitcher. He pitched collegiately for the University of Miami, and was selected by the St. Louis Cardinals in the first round (42nd overall) of the 2006 Major League Baseball draft. Perez also played for the Cleveland Indians and Los Angeles Dodgers.

== Career ==
=== St. Louis Cardinals ===
Perez began his professional career in 2006 with the Swing of the Quad Cities, the Midwest League affiliate of the Cardinals.

He was 1–1 with a team-leading eleven saves and a 3.20 ERA in 26 games for the Triple-A Memphis Redbirds in 2008. He fanned 38 batters in his 25 1/3 innings pitched, walked 12 and allowed 18 hits. He was added to the Cardinals 25-man active roster from Triple-A Memphis on May 16, 2008. He made his debut that same day, working one scoreless inning in relief against the Tampa Bay Rays. He picked up his first career save on August 6 against the Los Angeles Dodgers.

He attended the Cardinals' 2009 spring training camp to compete for a relief pitcher spot, but had arm trouble and was returned to the minor leagues for more experience. In 70 total games with the Cardinals, he was 4-4 with a 3.72 ERA and 8 saves.

=== Cleveland Indians ===
Perez and Jess Todd were traded to the Cleveland Indians on June 27, 2009, for Mark DeRosa. Following the trade of Kerry Wood to the New York Yankees on July 31, 2010, Perez became the Indians' permanent closer.

After a breakout 2011 season that included playing in the All-Star Game and being fourth in the league in saves, on February 23, 2012, Perez strained his left oblique in spring training and was expected to miss 4–6 weeks. However, Perez himself set a goal for March 15. He was throwing a 10-minute bullpen session, when, after 25–30 pitches, he felt a pain in his left side. He returned for Opening Day despite the injury, but blew the save by loading the bases and allowing multiple runs.

Perez's ongoing and vocal criticism of Indians fans has made him a controversial figure. In May and June 2012, Perez publicly criticized Indians fans in response to the team beginning the season last in attendance across both leagues and for being booed in a game on May 17. Perez was booed in the 10th inning for allowing two runners, although the opposition failed to score in the inning and the Indians won the game.

On July 1, Perez was named to his second consecutive All-Star Game as a member of the American League squad, joining Indians teammate Asdrúbal Cabrera. At the time of his selection, Perez had converted 23 of 24 save opportunities; his save count total tied for best in the Majors.

Perez throws just two pitches: a four-seam fastball at 93–96 mph and a slider at 82–86.

On August 13, 2012, Perez earned his 100th save in a 6–2 victory over the Los Angeles Angels of Anaheim. He entered the ninth inning with runners on first and second but recorded three strikeouts to record the save. On January 18, 2013, the Cleveland Indians announced they had avoided arbitration with Perez, signing him to a one-year contract worth $7.3 million.

On August 5, 2013, Perez blew a save to the Detroit Tigers, and after the game decided to boycott the media for the rest of the season, which led to a rocky relationship between him and the fans. On September 29, 2013, he broke his silence and talked with the media.

The Cleveland Indians released Perez on October 31, 2013.

=== Los Angeles Dodgers ===
On December 24, 2013, He signed a one-year contract with the Los Angeles Dodgers. The contract included a base salary of $2.3 million with incentives worth as much as $8 million. Perez appeared in 49 games for the Dodgers and was 1–3 with a 4.27 ERA. He was owed a $500,000 bonus if he appeared in 50 games, but the Dodgers did not use him at all the last week of the season to avoid paying the bonus.

=== Milwaukee Brewers ===
On February 5, 2015, Perez signed a minor league contract with the Milwaukee Brewers the deal included an invitation to spring training. He was released on March 29. He was re-signed to another minor league contract two days later, and exercised an opt-out on April 27. On June 24, it was announced that Perez was suspended for 50 games for violating the drug policy by testing positive for a drug of abuse.

=== Baltimore Orioles ===
On July 2, 2015, Perez signed a minor league deal with the Orioles, despite still being suspended. He retired on August 22.

== Personal ==
Perez grew up on Anna Maria Island with his father, Tim Perez, who is of Spanish descent. He resides in Tampa, Florida, with his wife, Melanie.

His entrance music is "Firestarter" by The Prodigy. He is nicknamed "Pure Rage" and uses it as his Twitter handle. He deleted his Twitter account at the beginning of the 2013 to "minimize any potential off-the-field distractions."

Perez and his wife were arrested on June 4, 2013, in Rocky River, Ohio, on marijuana possession charges.
