= Rick Porcello =

American baseball player (born 1988)

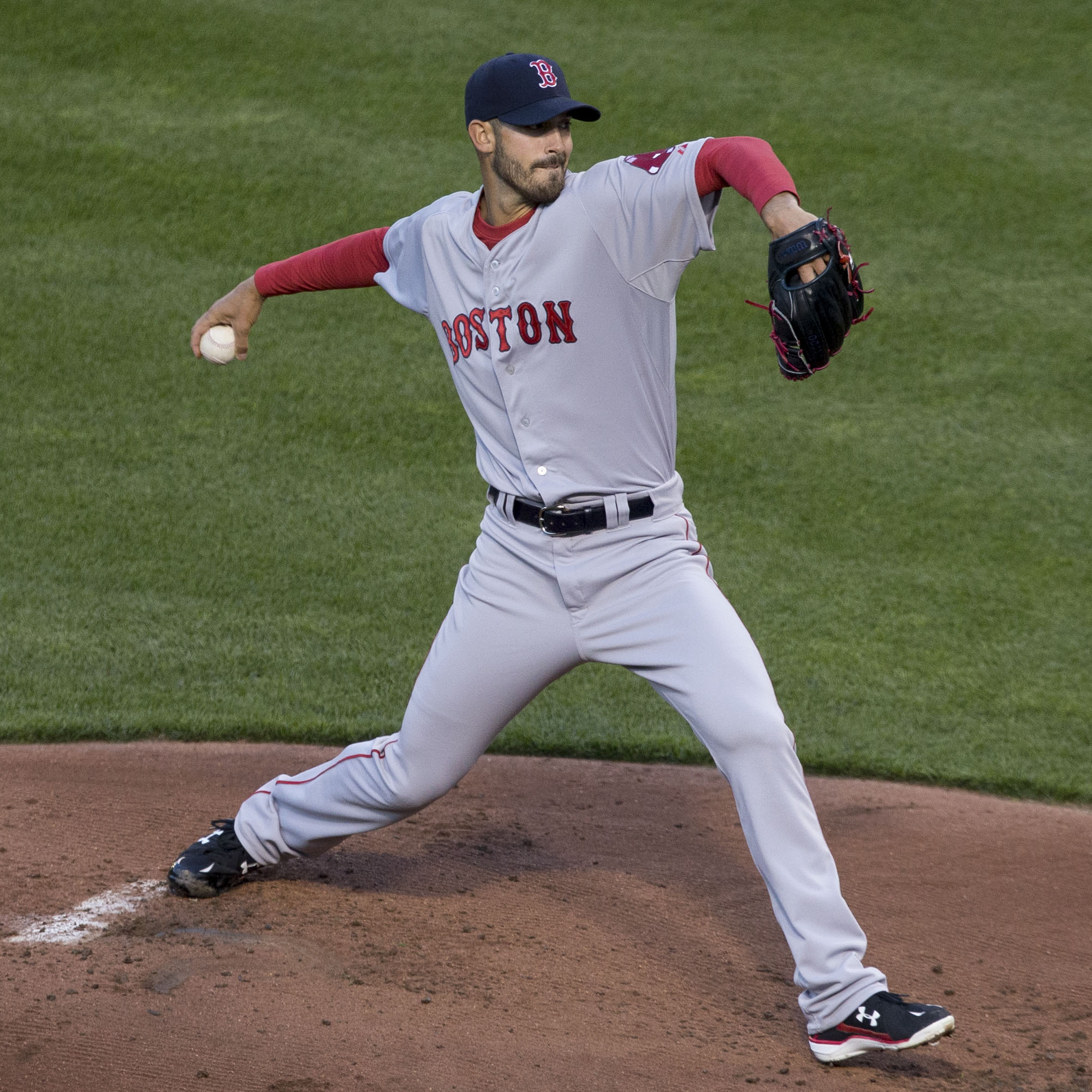
- Porcello with the Boston Red Sox in 2015
- Pitcher
- Born: December 27, 1988 (age 37); Morristown, New Jersey, U.S.
- Batted: Right Threw: Right

MLB debut
- April 9, 2009, for the Detroit Tigers

Last MLB appearance
- September 26, 2020, for the New York Mets

MLB statistics
- Win–loss record: 150–125
- Earned run average: 4.40
- Strikeouts: 1,561
- Stats at Baseball Reference

Teams
- Detroit Tigers (2009–2014); Boston Red Sox (2015–2019); New York Mets (2020)

Career highlights and awards
- World Series champion (2018); AL Cy Young Award (2016); AL Comeback Player of the Year (2016); MLB wins leader (2016)

Frederick Alfred Porcello III (born December 27, 1988) is an American former professional baseball pitcher. He played in Major League Baseball (MLB) for the Detroit Tigers, Boston Red Sox and New York Mets.

Selected by the Tigers in the 2007 MLB draft, he made his MLB debut in 2009, and was the youngest player in the American League. His manager, Jim Leyland, chose to start him in the 2009 American League Central tie-breaker game over Nate Robertson, Eddie Bonine, and Armando Galarraga. After the 2014 season, the Tigers traded Porcello to the Red Sox. He struggled in 2015, but rebounded in 2016, leading the majors in wins and winning the AL Cy Young Award (becoming the first Red Sox pitcher since Pedro Martínez to do so) and the AL Comeback Player of the Year Award. He won the 2018 World Series with the Boston Red Sox, starting the third game of the series.

== Amateur career ==
Porcello graduated from Seton Hall Preparatory School in West Orange, New Jersey, in 2007. In his senior season, he compiled a 10–0 record with 103 strikeouts and a 1.44 ERA in 63 innings pitched. He threw a perfect game on May 12, 2007, against Newark Academy.

Although Porcello signed a letter of intent to attend the University of North Carolina, he later declined in order to pursue his professional career in Major League Baseball. Porcello was drafted 27th overall in the first round of the 2007 Major League Baseball draft by the Tigers. His choice of sports agent Scott Boras to advise him may have scared away some teams, knocking him down to the 27th spot even though he was ranked No. 1 among high school prospects entering the draft. Porcello had been described as an "ace" who could be a "bona fide No. 1 starter." He was also known as a "special" pitcher. Porcello was signed by the Detroit Tigers to a $7.28 million, four-year deal with two one-year options. The total contract was worth $11.1 million, making Porcello the highest-paid high schooler ever. He also received a $3.5 million signing bonus, the second-largest ever given out by the Tigers, surpassed only by the $3.55 million given to 2006 first round pick Andrew Miller.

== Minor league career ==
Porcello played the entire 2008 season with the Lakeland Flying Tigers of the Class A-Advanced Florida State League. He earned his first victory against the Tampa Yankees on April 3, 2008. On May 12, he was named the Florida State League Pitcher of the Week. On July 19, he took part in a seven inning combined no-hitter against the St. Lucie Mets. Porcello finished the season with a record of 8–6 in 125 innings pitched. His 2.66 ERA was the lowest in the FSL.

== Major league career ==
=== Detroit Tigers ===
==== 2009 ====
On February 7, 2009, Tigers general manager Dave Dombrowski stated that Porcello would be considered for the final spot in the Tigers rotation, pending his spring training performance. Porcello began drawing comparisons to Boston Red Sox ace Josh Beckett, namely from Tigers official Al Avila, who was the Florida Marlins scouting director when the team drafted Beckett in 1999. On April 1, Dombrowski confirmed that Porcello would make the 2009 opening day roster after posting a 2.63 ERA in five Grapefruit League games. Dombrowski stated:

[Porcello] is one of our best starting pitchers ... He has quality stuff and throws strikes. Rick is confident and mature beyond his years. And he has a very, very nasty sinker that gets him out of trouble.

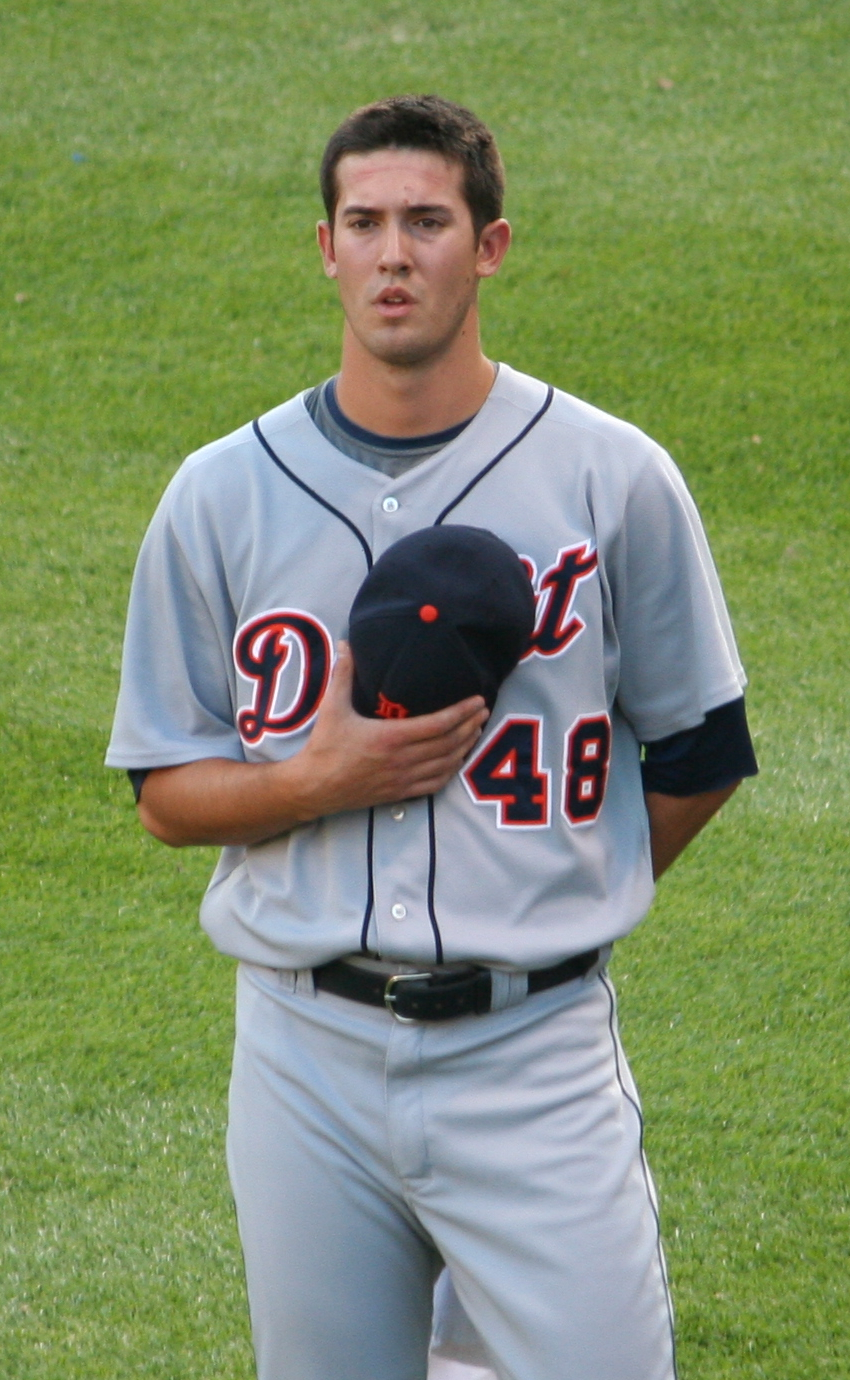
Porcello with the Detroit Tigers in 2009

On April 9, Porcello made his Major League debut against Toronto, opposite Blue Jays rookie pitcher Ricky Romero. The game marked the first time in MLB history that two first-round picks faced each other in their respective debuts. Porcello pitched five innings and took the loss for Detroit. He struck out four batters and allowed four runs on eight hits.

On April 19, Porcello earned his first career win in an 8–2 victory over the Seattle Mariners. He allowed one run and struck out three in seven innings with no walks. He retired the final 14 batters he faced.

Porcello won all five games he started in May. He became the youngest pitcher to win five starts in a row since Dwight Gooden won seven in a row in 1985, as well as the first Tiger age 20 or younger to win five consecutive starts since at least 1954 (research prior to that year is incomplete).

On August 11, during a game against the Boston Red Sox, Porcello hit Kevin Youkilis with a pitch. Youkilis charged the mound, threw his helmet right in front of Porcello, and tackled him to the ground as both benches cleared. Both players were ejected for the brawl and were sentenced to five-game suspensions.

Despite his youth, Porcello was selected by Tiger manager Jim Leyland to pitch in the one-game tie-breaker playoff for the AL Central Division crown after the Tigers and Minnesota Twins both finished the regular season at 86–76. Porcello allowed two runs (one earned) in 5 2/3 innings of work, getting a no-decision in the game that the Twins eventually won in 12 innings.

Porcello finished the 2009 season with a 14–9 record and 3.96 ERA. On November 16, it was announced that Porcello finished third in the voting for American League Rookie of the Year, behind Andrew Bailey of the Oakland Athletics and Elvis Andrus of the Texas Rangers.

==== 2010 ====
Porcello began the 2010 season with a 4–7 record, accumulating a 6.14 ERA. On June 20, 2010 he was sent down to AAA Toledo. He was called back up on July 17 to face the Indians. In his first start back with the team, Porcello pitched very well, continuing the trend of struggling starters in the Tiger rotation finding success upon returning from the AAA Toledo Mud Hens. He went eight innings against the Indians, allowing one run, striking out six, and walking none, albeit in a Tigers loss.

Porcello finished the 2010 season with a 10–12 record, going 5–1 in his last 7 starts, and bringing his season ERA down to 4.92.

==== 2011 ====
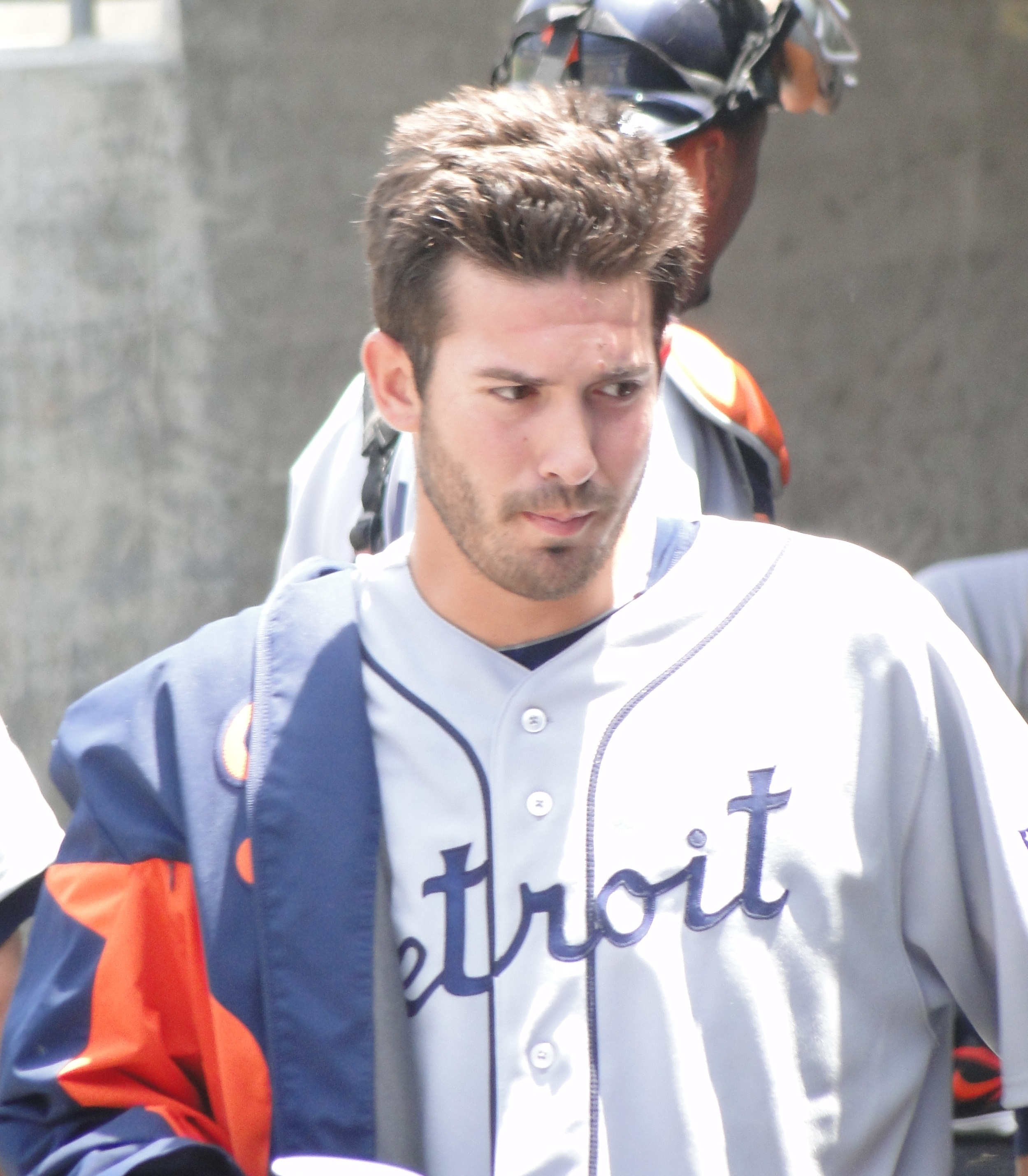
Porcello at Dodger Stadium, June 2011

Porcello entered Spring Training competing for a job in the Tigers starting rotation, battling with teammates Phil Coke, Jacob Turner, and Brad Penny for a spot. He ended up in the Tigers rotation for the 2011 season.

He started in 31 games for the Tigers, pitching 182 innings, while accumulating a 14–9 record, 104 strikeouts and a 4.75 ERA.

In the 2011 postseason, Porcello made four appearances (two starts), compiling an 0–1 record with a 4.80 ERA and 12 strikeouts in 15 innings.

==== 2012 ====
On January 6, 2012, Porcello opted out of an option for 2012 included in his four-year contract, becoming arbitration eligible and under team control through 2015. After gaining Super Two status by reaching the required amount of service time, Porcello gained an extra year of arbitration eligibility, which was 2012. On January 16, Porcello agreed to a one-year, $3.1 million deal with the Tigers, avoiding arbitration. Because he filed for arbitration and did not accept his option for 2012, he earned an extra $1.76 million.

Porcello made 31 starts in 2012, going 10–12 with a 4.59 ERA. He struck out a career-high 107 batters on the season, but also surrendered a career-high 226 hits. Porcello was on the postseason roster for the Tigers, who went all the way to the World Series, but he pitched only 1 1/3 postseason innings, allowing no runs.

==== 2013 ====
On January 18, 2013, Porcello signed a one-year, $5.1 million contract with the Tigers to avoid arbitration for a second time. With the Tigers signing fourth starter Aníbal Sánchez to a five-year deal, Porcello competed with Drew Smyly for the fifth and final spot in the Tigers rotation. On March 26, it was announced that Porcello had won the No. 5 starter job over Smyly.

In his Tigers career through 2012, Porcello wore uniform number 48. When the Tigers acquired outfielder Torii Hunter – who also wears number 48 – in the 2012–13 offseason, Hunter made a monetary offer for the number. Porcello, a New Jersey native, instead asked Hunter to donate the money he offered to victims of Hurricane Sandy, and Porcello changed to number 21 for the 2013 season.

In a May 28 game against the Pittsburgh Pirates, Porcello pitched eight shutout innings and fanned 11 batters to establish a new career high for strikeouts in a game.

On June 30, Porcello threw a pitch that hit Ben Zobrist of the Tampa Bay Rays. It was widely thought that the pitch was in retaliation for a pitch that Rays reliever Fernando Rodney threw near the head of Tigers superstar Miguel Cabrera the night before. The benches were warned and there were no incidents the remainder of the game, but two days later, MLB suspended Porcello six games and fined him an undisclosed amount. On September 10, Porcello pitched his first career complete game in his 147th major league start, resulting in a 9–1 win over the Chicago White Sox. Porcello retired 14 consecutive batters after escaping a fourth-inning jam that yielded his only run allowed.

Porcello finished the regular season with a 13–8 record, 4.32 ERA, and a career-high 142 strikeouts.

==== 2014 ====
On January 17, 2014, Porcello and the Tigers avoided arbitration for the third straight season by agreeing to a one-year deal worth $8.5 million.

On June 26, Porcello pitched his first career shutout in a 6–0 win over the Texas Rangers. He gave up just three hits in the game, striking out six and throwing 115 pitches. In his next start on July 1, Porcello pitched a complete-game shutout in a 3–0 win over the Oakland Athletics, giving up four hits, striking out zero, walking no one, and throwing 95 pitches. Porcello became the first Tiger to pitch back-to-back shutouts since Jack Morris in 1986. He became the first Major League pitcher to throw a shutout without a walk or a strikeout since Jeff Ballard on August 21, 1989. In a more recent distinction, he became the first Major League pitcher to throw a no-strikeout shutout since Derek Lowe did it for the Indians on May 15, 2012.

On August 20, Porcello pitched his third shutout of the season in a 6–0 win over the Tampa Bay Rays, giving up three hits, striking out four and walking none. Porcello is the first Tiger pitcher to throw at least three shutouts in a season since Jeff Weaver in 2002. Porcello's three shutouts tied him with Henderson Álvarez for the major league lead. On August 26, Rick defeated the New York Yankees 5–2 for his 15th victory of the season, establishing a new career high in wins. He had won 14 games in two prior seasons (2009, 2011). Rick struggled down the stretch, however, going 0–4 with a 6.20 ERA in September. He finished the 2014 regular season with a 15–13 record, 129 strikeouts, and a career-best 3.43 ERA. He topped 200 innings pitched for the first time in his career, with 204 2/3.

=== Boston Red Sox ===
On December 11, 2014, the Tigers traded Porcello to the Boston Red Sox in exchange for Yoenis Céspedes, Alex Wilson, and Gabe Speier. On April 6, 2015, Porcello and the Red Sox agreed on a 4-year contract extension worth $82.5 million, including a $500,000 signing bonus.

==== 2015 ====
On August 2, 2015, Porcello was placed on the Disabled List (retroactive to July 30) for the first time in his career, with the Red Sox stating he was suffering from triceps soreness and inflammation. At the time, Rick was mired in his worst season, statistically, having posted a 5–11 record and a 5.81 ERA prior to the injury. He returned August 26 and threw seven shutout innings in a 3–0 win over the Chicago White Sox. In his next start, September 1 against the New York Yankees, Porcello struck out a career-high 13 batters in 8 innings, but lost a 3-1 decision. Porcello finished his first season in Boston with a 9–15 record in 28 starts, and an ERA of 4.92 which tied his career high. He gave up a career-high 25 home runs, but also had a career-high strikeout rate (7.8 K/9).

==== 2016 ====
Porcello rebounded from a bad season by leading the Red Sox back to the playoffs on the way to winning the Cy Young Award. On September 9, 2016, Porcello became the first pitcher to reach 20 wins for the season, as the Red Sox defeated the Toronto Blue Jays, 13–3. Porcello led the major leagues in 2016 with 22 wins (against four losses) and posted career bests in most major statistical categories, including: games started (33), innings pitched (223), strikeouts (189), ERA (3.15) and WHIP (1.01). He also allowed 32 walks over the entire season, leading the major leagues with a 5.91 strikeout-to-walk ratio, and threw three complete games. Porcello's 26 quality starts were tied for the AL lead with former teammate Justin Verlander.

On November 7, Porcello was announced by the Baseball Writers' Association of America (BBWAA) as a finalist for the 2016 American League Cy Young Award, along with Verlander and Corey Kluber. On November 9, Porcello was named the American League's Outstanding Pitcher, given by the Major League Baseball Players Association (MLBPA).

On November 16, Porcello won the 2016 American League Cy Young Award in unique fashion. He became the first pitcher in American League history to win the award despite not receiving the most first-place votes from the BBWAA. Porcello's former teammate with the Tigers, Verlander, received 14 first-place votes to Porcello's 8, but two Tampa Bay writers left Verlander off their five-pitcher ballots entirely. Porcello received the most second-place votes of anyone appearing on a ballot, giving him the award. The final tally of 137 to 132 was the third closest vote since 1970. Porcello's eight first place votes (out of 30 possible) was the third-fewest for a Cy Young Award winner. Porcello became the fourth Red Sox pitcher to win the award, joining Jim Lonborg, Roger Clemens, and Pedro Martínez. He also became the first American League pitcher to win the award while posting an ERA higher than 3.00 (no AL starting pitcher had a sub-3 ERA in the 2016 season) and fewer than 200 strikeouts since Bartolo Colón in 2005.

==== 2017 ====
Porcello struggled the ensuing season after winning the Cy Young Award the previous season, finishing with a career high 17 losses. He also gave up 38 home runs, more than any other major league pitcher. He struck out 181 batters in 203 1/3 innings.

==== 2018 ====
Porcello began the 2018 season in Boston's starting rotation. On April 12, against the Yankees, Porcello took a no-hitter through 6+ innings until giving up a double by Aaron Judge. Porcello pitched through seven innings, giving up only two hits while striking out six as the Red Sox won, 6–3. In another start against the Yankees, Porcello threw a complete game with 86 pitches, allowing only one run on one hit, a solo homerun hit by Miguel Andújar in the 3rd inning. During the regular season, he made 33 starts for the Red Sox, going 17–7 with a 4.28 ERA in 191 1/3 innings. The Red Sox finished with a 108–54 record and went on to face the Los Angeles Dodgers in the World Series. Porcello was Boston's starting pitcher in Game 3, getting a no decision in an extra innings loss. The Red Sox went on to win the series in five games, giving Porcello his first career championship title.

==== 2019 ====
Porcello again began the season in Boston's starting rotation. For the season, he made 32 appearances (all starts) compiling a 14–12 record with 143 strikeouts in 174 1/3 innings with a 5.52 ERA, the highest in the majors among qualified starters. He became a free agent on October 31.

=== New York Mets ===
==== 2020 ====
On December 16, 2019, the New York Mets announced that they signed Porcello to a one-year contract. His first game was on July 26, against the Atlanta Braves, in a season which was shortened to 60 games due to the COVID-19 pandemic. Porcello endured a poor 2020 season, struggling to a 1–7 record and 5.64 ERA with 54 strikeouts in 59 innings of work. He became a free agent after the season.

Porcello did not pitch in 2021 or 2022 and announced his retirement on December 5, 2022.

== Personal life ==
Porcello graduated from Seton Hall Prep with a GPA around 3.9 and was inducted into the National Honor Society and Spanish National Honor Society. His older brother Zach is a pitching coach at Seton Hall University. His younger brother Jake is a 2009 graduate of Seton Hall Prep and was a pitcher at Seton Hall University and was drafted by the Tigers in the 48th round of the 2009 draft.

Porcello is the maternal grandson of Sam Dente, who played for the Cleveland Indians in the 1954 World Series.

== Pitching style ==
Porcello is a groundball pitcher who relies on a sinking two-seam fastball. He throws his two-seamer about half the time, ranging around 90 mph. He also has a four-seam fastball in the 91–93 range (tops out at 94–95 mph) and a circle changeup in the low 80s which is used mostly on left-handed hitters. He used to throw an occasional slider, but scrapped it prior to the 2013 season for a more effective upper-70s curveball. Porcello's former pitching coach Jeff Jones for the Tigers describes the curve as a "change of pace, something that he can throw as a first pitch to a left-handed hitter for a strike."

Porcello's groundball rate in 2013 was 55.3%, the highest of his career and one of the best in the majors, while his flyball rate was only 23.7%.

== Awards and recognition ==
- 2016 American League Cy Young Award.
- Selected to the 2006 AFLAC High School All-American Classic Baseball game in San Diego, California
- Named the 2006–07 Gatorade national baseball player of the year
- Selected for the 2008 Florida State League mid-season and post-season All-Star teams
- Named the AL Rookie of the Month for May 2009
- Named Tigers Rookie of the Year for 2009

Preceded by Clayton Kershaw; 2008	Youngest Player in Major League Baseball; 2009	Succeeded by Starlin Castro; 2010
Preceded by Travis Snider	Youngest Player in the American League; 2009	Succeeded by Chris Sale
