= 2013 Chicago White Sox season =

2013 Chicago White Sox
- League: American League
- Division: Central
- Ballpark: U.S. Cellular Field
- City: Chicago, Illinois
- Record: 63–99 (.389)
- Divisional place: 5th
- Owners: Jerry Reinsdorf
- General managers: Rick Hahn
- Managers: Robin Ventura
- Television: CSN Chicago; CSN+ WGN-TV and WGN America; WCIU-TV (Ken Harrelson, Steve Stone)
- Radio: WSCR (Ed Farmer, Darrin Jackson); WNUA HD-2 (Spanish) (Hector Molina, Billy Russo)

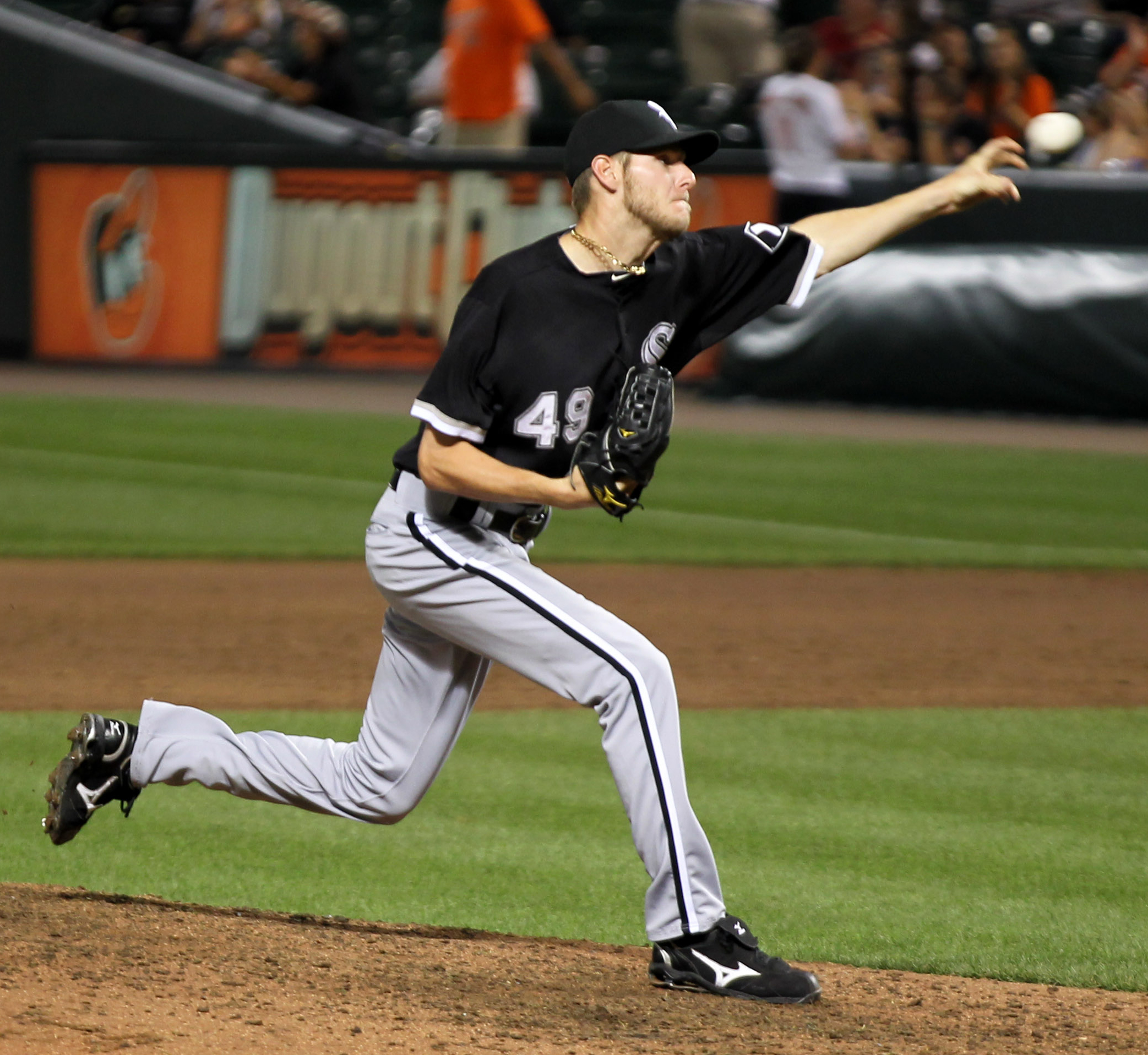
Chris Sale, 2011

The 2013 Chicago White Sox season was the club's 114th season in Chicago and 113th in the American League.

== Offseason ==
White Sox promoted Kenny Williams to Executive Vice President; Rick Hahn became the team's new General Manager.

=== Offseason additions and subtractions ===
	Subtractions	Additions
Players	RHP Philip Humber (claimed off waivers by Astros); LHP Francisco Liriano (signed with Pirates); RHP Brett Myers (signed with Indians); RHP Brian Bruney (free agent); C A. J. Pierzynski (signed with Rangers); 1B Dan Johnson (signed with Yankees); 3B Kevin Youkilis (signed with Yankees); INF Ray Olmedo (signed with Twins); INF José López (signed with NPB Yomiuri Giants); INF Orlando Hudson (free agent)	RHP Matt Lindstrom (free agent); RHP Zach Stewart (claimed off waivers from Pirates); RHP Jeff Gray** (Minor League free agent); RHP Tony Peña Jr.* (Minor League free agent); 1B Randy Ruiz (Minor League free agent); 3B Conor Gillaspie (Traded from Giants); 3B Josh Bell** (Minor League free agent); INF Jeff Keppinger (free agent); INF Ángel Sánchez (claimed off waivers from Angels); OF Blake Tekotte (traded from Padres); OF Stefan Gartrell* (Minor League free agent)
Personnel	GM Kenny Williams†	GM Rick Hahn†; First base coach Daryl Boston; Assistant hitting coach Harold Baines†

†Player/Personnel promoted following 2012 season
*Player spent entire 2012 season in Minor Leagues
**Player was non-roster invitee to Spring training (not on 40-man roster)

=== 2013 top prospects ===
Ranked before 2013 season

#	Player	Position	Top 100 Rank	MLB Rank	2013 Starting Team (Level)
1	Courtney Hawkins	Outfielder	55	68	Advanced A
2	Trayce Thompson	Outfielder	-	-	AA
3	Erik Johnson	Right-handed pitcher	-	-	AA
4	Carlos Sánchez	Second baseman/Shortstop	-	-	AAA
5	Jared Mitchell	Outfielder	-	-	AAA
6	Scott Snodgress	Left-handed pitcher	-	-	AA
7	Keon Barnum	First baseman	-	-	Rookie
8	Keenyn Walker	Outfielder	-	-	AA
9	Andre Rienzo	Right-handed pitcher	-	-	AAA
10	Chris Beck	Right-handed pitcher	-	-	Advanced A

* According to Baseball America Top 100 Prospects

* According to 2013 Prospect Watch

* Top 10 White Sox prospects via Baseball America

== Regular season ==
=== Transactions ===
- 04/01/13 – Signed free agent SS Tyler Greene to a minor league deal.
- 04/01/13 – Acquired 1B Lars Anderson from the Toronto Blue Jays for cash.
- 04/02/13 – Signed free agent RHP Jason Berken to a minor league deal.
- 04/23/13 – Signed free agent LHP Charles Leesman to a minor league deal.
- 04/29/13 – Acquired OF Casper Wells from the Oakland Athletics for cash.
- 05/07/13 – Claimed 1B/DH Mike McDade off waivers from Cleveland Indians.
- 07/02/13 – Signed International free agent OF Micker Zapata from the Dominican Republic.
- 07/13/13 – Traded LHP Matt Thornton and cash to the Boston Red Sox for OF Brandon Jacobs.
- 07/29/13 – Traded RHP Jesse Crain and cash to the Tampa Bay Rays for Player to be named later and/or cash considerations.
- 07/30/13 – Traded RHP Jake Peavy to the Boston Red Sox in part of three-way trade with Detroit Tigers for OF Avisaíl García from the Tigers and RHP J.B. Wendelken, RHP Francellis Montas and SS Cleuluis Rondon from the Red Sox.
- 08/03/13 – Released OF DeWayne Wise.
- 08/08/13 – Philadelphia Phillies claimed OF Casper Wells off of waivers and received cash for a player to be named later.
- 08/09/13 – Traded OF Alex Ríos and cash to the Texas Rangers after being claimed off of waivers for Leury García.
- 09/21/13 – Received LHP Frank De Los Santos from a trade with the Tampa Bay Rays for cash considerations.

=== Season standings ===
==== American League Central ====
AL Central
Team	W	L	Pct.	GB	Home	Road
Detroit Tigers	93	69	.574	—	51‍–‍30	42‍–‍39
Cleveland Indians	92	70	.568	1	51‍–‍30	41‍–‍40
Kansas City Royals	86	76	.531	7	44‍–‍37	42‍–‍39
Minnesota Twins	66	96	.407	27	32‍–‍49	34‍–‍47
Chicago White Sox	63	99	.389	30	37‍–‍44	26‍–‍55

==== American League Wild Card ====
Division winners
Team	W	L	Pct.
Boston Red Sox	97	65	.599
Oakland Athletics	96	66	.593
Detroit Tigers	93	69	.574

Wild Card teams (Top 2 teams qualify for postseason)
Team	W	L	Pct.	GB
Cleveland Indians	92	70	.568	+½
Tampa Bay Rays	92	71	.564	—
Texas Rangers	91	72	.558	1
Kansas City Royals	86	76	.531	5½
New York Yankees	85	77	.525	6½
Baltimore Orioles	85	77	.525	6½
Los Angeles Angels of Anaheim	78	84	.481	13½
Toronto Blue Jays	74	88	.457	17½
Seattle Mariners	71	91	.438	20½
Minnesota Twins	66	96	.407	25½
Chicago White Sox	63	99	.389	28½
Houston Astros	51	111	.315	40½

=== Record vs. opponents ===
2013 American League record Source: MLB Standings Grid – 2013
Team	BAL	BOS	CWS	CLE	DET	HOU	KC	LAA	MIN	NYY	OAK	SEA	TB	TEX	TOR	NL
Baltimore	—	11–8	4–3	3–4	4–2	4–2	3–4	5–2	3–3	9–10	5–2	2–4	6–13	5–2	10–9	11–9
Boston	8–11	—	4–2	6–1	3–4	6–1	2–5	3–3	4–3	13–6	3–3	6–1	12–7	2–4	11–8	14–6
Chicago	3–4	2–4	—	2–17	7–12	3–4	9–10	3–4	8–11	3–3	2–5	3–3	2–5	4–2	4–3	8–12
Cleveland	4–3	1–6	17–2	—	4–15	6–1	10–9	4–2	13–6	1–6	5–2	5–2	2–4	5–1	4–2	11–9
Detroit	2–4	4–3	12–7	15–4	—	6–1	9–10	0–6	11–8	3–3	3–4	5–2	3–3	3–4	5–2	12–8
Houston	2–4	1–6	4–3	1–6	1–6	—	2–4	10–9	1–5	1–5	4–15	9–10	2–5	2–17	3–4	8–12
Kansas City	4–3	5–2	10–9	9–10	10–9	4–2	—	2–5	15–4	2–5	1–5	4–3	6–1	3–3	2–4	9–11
Los Angeles	2–5	3–3	4–3	2–4	6–0	9–10	5–2	—	1–5	3–4	8–11	11–8	4–3	4–15	6–1	10–10
Minnesota	3–3	3–4	11–8	6–13	8–11	5–1	4–15	5–1	—	2–5	1–6	4–3	1–6	4–3	1–5	8–12
New York	10–9	6–13	3–3	6–1	3–3	5–1	5–2	4–3	5–2	—	1–5	4–3	7–12	3–4	14–5	9–11
Oakland	2–5	3–3	5–2	2–5	4–3	15–4	5–1	11–8	6–1	5–1	—	8–11	3–3	10–9	4–3	13–7
Seattle	4–2	1–6	3–3	2–5	2–5	10–9	3–4	8–11	3–4	3–4	11–8	—	3–3	7–12	3–3	8–12
Tampa Bay	13–6	7–12	5–2	4–2	3–3	5–2	1–6	3–4	6–1	12–7	3–3	3–3	—	4–4	11–8	12–8
Texas	2–5	4–2	2–4	1–5	4–3	17–2	3–3	15–4	3–4	4–3	9–10	12–7	4–4	—	1–6	10–10
Toronto	9–10	8–11	3–4	2–4	2–5	4–3	4–2	1–6	5–1	5–14	3–4	3–3	8–11	6–1	—	11–9

==== Detailed records and runs scored/allowed ====
Opponent	Home	Away	Total	Pct.	Runs scored	Runs allowed
AL East
Baltimore Orioles	2–1	1–3	3–4	.429	18	21
Boston Red Sox	2–1	0–3	2–4	.333	22	29
New York Yankees	3–0	0–3	3–3	.500	27	29
Tampa Bay Rays	2–2	0–3	2–5	.286	21	38
Toronto Blue Jays	2–1	2–2	4–3	.571	33	25
	11–5	3–14	14–19	.424	121	142
AL Central
Cleveland Indians	1–9	1–8	2–17	.105	57	118
Detroit Tigers	4–6	3–6	7–12	.368	76	90
Kansas City Royals	3–7	6–3	9–10	.474	56	57
Minnesota Twins	3–6	5–5	8–11	.421	87	85
	11–28	15–22	26–50	.342	276	350
AL West
Houston Astros	2–1	1–3	3–4	.429	30	27
Los Angeles Angels	1–2	2–2	3–4	.429	29	32
Oakland Athletics	2–2	0–3	2–5	.286	18	21
Seattle Mariners	2–1	1–2	3–3	.500	21	25
Texas Rangers	2–1	2–1	4–2	.667	27	28
	9–7	6–11	15–18	.455	132	138
Interleague
Atlanta Braves	2–1	0–0	2–1	.667	17	13
Chicago Cubs	0–2	0–2	0–4	.000	8	32
Miami Marlins	3–0	0–0	3–0	1.000	11	7
New York Mets	1–1	1–1	2–2	.500	11	11
Philadelphia Phillies	0–0	1–2	1–2	.333	9	10
Washington Nationals	0–0	0–3	0–3	.000	13	20
	6–4	2–8	8–12	.400	69	93

=== Season summary ===
==== Composite inning summary ====
	1	2	3	4	5	6	7	8	9	10	11	12	13	14	15	16
Runs scored	75	49	52	82	62	87	67	68	45	3	5	3	0	5	0	2
Runs allowed	77	76	69	102	102	84	60	75	52	15	1	5	1	5	0	0

==== Opening Day lineup ====
Alejandro De Aza	CF
Jeff Keppinger	3B
Adam Dunn	DH
Alex Ríos	RF
Paul Konerko	1B
Dayán Viciedo	LF
Alexei Ramírez	SS
Tyler Flowers	C
Gordon Beckham	2B
Chris Sale	P

=== Monthly summaries ===
==== April ====
The Sox won the opening series against the Royals, including a 1–0 victory on Opening Day and then won the series against the Mariners to complete their first homestand of the season. In the finale of that series, the Sox achieved their first walk-off win of the season in extras. Last season, the Sox did not achieve their first walk-off win until June 7. Since 2008, the Sox went 19–4 at home against Seattle. The Sox went to Washington, D.C., where they took on one of the World Series contending teams, the Nationals. The Sox were unsurprisingly been swept and fall to 4-5 all time against the Nationals. Until 2013, April was the only baseball month when Sox never faced NL teams along with all other AL teams. The Sox swept the Nationals in their last visit to D.C. in 2010. The Sox went to Cleveland where they lost two of three to that upgraded team. The Sox went to Toronto where they faced the top favorite in the AL East, the Blue Jays. The Sox would split the four-game series, winning in second and third games. That was the seventh consecutive seasons that they played four-game series in Toronto, and the Sox are 9–19 in that span.

The Sox went to the homestand for the second time this season. Friday's game against the Twins was postponed due to cold and the three-game series was reduced to two-game series. The Sox were swept in that short series. In the next home series against another division rival, the Indians. The scheduled three-game series was against reduced to two-game series as one of the games was postponed due to rain. This series has a different result as they split the series. The Sox would go on to play the series against the Rays for as many games as against the division rivals in this homestand. The Sox resulted in the split, winning in first two games before losing final two. They went back on the road to play the Rangers, Royals, and Mets, though only the first game was played in April.

==== May ====
The Sox lost the first game of the series in Texas before winning the final two. The Rangers suffered only their first series loss of the 2013 season. The team went straight to Kansas City, but the opening game was postponed due to rain. Next day, the Sox were shut out against Jeremy Guthrie, 2–0. Guthrie set the franchise record at 17 consecutive starts without a loss. Before the game, it was announced that Gavin Floyd would undergo Tommy John surgery and miss 14–19 months. In the following game, the Sox led after eight innings but went on to lose in extras. In the series finale, which was a make-up game from three days earlier, Alexei Ramírez hit a long ball that was ruled foul but video showed it was actually a home-run that would have given the Sox the lead. The Sox trailed at that point until they tied it in the ninth of that same batter. In the eleventh inning, Jordan Danks hit the solo shot for a 2-1 Sox lead and went on to win by that score. Danks' first two career homers were game-winning. The Sox went on to play the Mets for the first time since 2002. In the first of two-game set against them, the Sox went almost offenseless as only one batter reached base via an infield single by Alex Ríos in the seventh. Mets ace Matt Harvey shut down the Sox lineup for nine innings, striking out a career-high twelve batters. The Sox played extra innings for a third consecutive game, tied 0-0. In the bottom of the tenth, Mike Baxter hit a walk-off single for the Sox's third walk-off loss of the year in their first ever visit to Queens. In the second game of the set, the Sox's offense broke through with six runs on 13 hits as the Sox defeated the Mets 6–3 for the series split. The Sox then came home for a three-game series with the Los Angeles Angels of Anaheim. After losing the first two games of the series, on May 12, the Sox avoided a sweep with the help of Chris Sale. Sale pitched a one-hit complete game shutout. He had a perfect game with one out in the seventh inning when Mike Trout singled up the middle. Trout was the lone base runner in the game as Sale had 7 strikeouts and walked none. This occurred just five days after team's offense was held to one hit and one base runner.

The Sox then went on a seven-game road trip, three against the Twins and four against the Angels. The Sox lost the opener of the series and then won final two to win the series. The Sox won first two against the Angels and then lost the final two for a split. The Sox went on to their 8-game homestand, five against last place teams in respective divisions. But first, they played three against the Red Sox, who were near the top of the AL East. In the series, White Sox beat Red Sox twice, including one when José Quintana took his no-hitter into the seventh inning until David Ortiz ended it with a single. After the series win, the Sox played three against the Marlins, who at the time had the worst record in baseball. The Sox swept that series against the Marlins, including two on walk-offs and one in extra innings. The Sox then played consecutive home-and-home series against the crosstown rival Cubs, starting with two in the South Side and finishing with two at Wrigley Field. The Sox lost the first game at the "Cell", 7–0, and the second game was postponed due to rain. Then the Sox lost both games at Wrigley Field, getting outscored 17–6. In the final game of the month, the Sox got shut out in Oakland 3–0 by former Sox pitcher Bartolo Colón. Despite a four-game losing streak to close out the month, the Sox finished the month with a winning record of 14–13.

==== June ====
The Sox started June getting swept by Athletics and losing two of three against the Mariners in the West. In the third game of that series on June 5, neither team scored runs until the 14th inning when Sox scored five runs in the top half, but the Mariners tied it in the bottom half with a grand slam by Kyle Seager. The Sox went on to win 7–5 in 16 innings. It was the first time in MLB history that each team scored five or more runs while neither team scored during the regulation (first nine innings). The Sox then played the A's again, this time at home where the Sox split the four-game series after winning the final two games of the series. The Sox split a short, two-game series against the Blue Jays that was cut short due to finale being rained out.

The Sox went on a lengthy, 10-game road trip. First stop was Houston, first visit there since winning the 2005 World Series. However, the Sox did not fare well as they lost the first three games of the series, but managed to win the series finale. Next stop was Minnesota, where they were swept in the three-game series. The final stop was south to Kansas City, where they took the first two games from the Royals. In the third game, the Sox lost 7–6 with three of those runs given up were unearned in the 8th inning. Jesse Crain gave up runs (all unearned) for the first time since April 12, snapping the franchise record 29 straight scoreless appearances. In the next series, the Sox split a two-game series against the Mets at home. In the first game, Addison Reed blew his save in the ninth when Daniel Murphy hit a popup, Gordon Beckham ran towards the territory where Reed and Conor Gillaspie were calling for but Beckham got in the way and no one caught the ball. The game was then tied at four as David Wright scored. White Sox TV broadcast announcer Hawk Harrelson famously said after the error: "and we find another way, yet another way." During the next at-bat with Andrew Brown, Harrelson was mostly silent aside from a few grievances, but ended his rant by shouting "you gotta be kidding me. You have got to be kidding me! We go to the bottom of the 9th" after Brown struck out to conclude the half inning alongside a chorus of boos from the White Sox fans. However, in the bottom of the ninth inning Alexei Ramírez hit a walk-off single, scoring Jeff Keppinger for a 5–4 Sox win. In the next game, the Sox were shutout 3–0, they were tied for the AL lead in shutouts as a result. Shawn Marcum picked up his first win of the season after starting the season 0–9. Marcum is now 4–0 with a 1.99 ERA in six career starts against the Pale Hose. The Sox played their consecutive doubleheader on June 28 against the Indians. In Game 1, the Sox lost 19–10, it was the first time the Sox lost a game despite scoring 10 or more runs since July 13, 2008, when they lost 12–11 to the Randers. Game 1 lasted nearly four hours, their longest 9-inning game this season. In Game 2, the Sox led 8–5 going to the ninth inning but Reed blew his second straight save by allowing four runs including game-winning solo home run by former Sox Nick Swisher and went on to lose 9–8. The Sox closed out the month by losing the final two games of the series by the final scores of 4–3 and 4–0. The Sox had the worst record in baseball for the month of June with a record of 8–19.

==== July ====
The Sox kicked off July by winning the series at home against the Orioles which began on July 2, including a walk-off win on Fourth of July by a home run by Adam Dunn, his ninth career. Ironically, the Sox had a walk-off win on Fourth of July in three straight years, last year was a single by Kevin Youkilis against the Rangers and the year before was a balk with Dunn at the plate against the Royals. After that series win, they headed to St. Pete where they get swept by Rays scoring only 4 runs during the three-game sweep. The Sox then played the makeup game with the Cubs that got rained out on May 28. The Sox lost the game 8–2 to complete the Cubs 4-game sweep of the Sox. The Sox were outscored 32–8 during the Cubs Crosstown Classic sweep. In the first game of a three games series in Detroit, the Sox scored a season high eleven runs during an 11–4 victory over the Tigers. The Sox also had a season-high 23 hits and Alex Ríos went 6 for 6 with a triple and five singles during the game. The six hits by Rios tied a franchise and American League record for most hits during a 9-inning game. The last White Sox player to have six hits in a 9-inning game was Lance Johnson on September 23, 1995, against the Twins. The Sox lost game two of the series vs. the Tigers but won the overall series due to a grand slam by rookie catcher Josh Phegley in the third and final game of the series. Phegley became the first Sox player with three home runs in his first five games since Magglio Ordóñez in 1997. The Sox then opened up a three-game series with the Philadelphia Phillies in Philadelphia. Just before the series began, Matt Thornton and cash was traded to the Boston Red Sox for minor leaguer Brandon Jacobs. After the first games was postponed due to the rain the Sox split a doubleheader with the Phillies with both games going into extra innings and each team winning by one run. The Sox lost the final games of the series once again in extra innings and lost by one run. The Sox were off from July 15–18 because of the All-Star break. Chris Sale and Jesse Crain were both All-Stars for the White Sox. Crain did not play in the All-Star game because of an injury and Sale was the winning pitcher in the game pitching two scoreless innings.

After the All-Star break, the Sox started a 10-game homestand starting with a three-game series against the Atlanta Braves, their final series against the National League this season. The Sox lost the first game, 6-4 but won the final two games of the series, 10–6 and 3–1 respectively. The Sox played the Tigers for four games losing the first three but salvaging the series with a win in the fourth game over Justin Verlander. The Royals then came to Chicago where the Royals swept the Sox, first Royals sweep in Chicago since April 9–11, 1999. The Sox only scored three runs during the three games series losing 5–1 in game 1, 1–0 in game 2 and 4–2 in twelve innings in game 3. The Sox traveled to Cleveland for a four-game series. Before the series against Cleveland, the Sox traded Jesse Crain to the Tampa Bay Rays for players to be named later and/or cash considerations. In game one, the Sox lost 3-2 due to a pinch-hit walk-off homer by 42-year-old veteran Jason Giambi. Giambi became the oldest player to hit a walk-off homer. Hank Aaron previously held the record set in 1976. The Sox went on to lose the second game of the series, 7–4. After that game, the Sox traded Jake Peavy to the Boston Red Sox in part of a three-way trade with the Tigers. The Sox acquired Avisaíl García from the Tigers and J.B. Wendelken, Francelis Montas and Cleuluis Rondon from the Red Sox. The Sox lost third of a four-game set against the Indians, 6–5 in 10 innings on July 31. It was their sixth straight loss and the White Sox closed out the month of July with a record of 8–18, the worst in baseball for the second straight month.

==== August ====
The Sox began the month with one more game against the Indians, who completed their four-game sweep of the Sox. The Sox would then get swept by Tigers to finish the road trip with a record of 0–7, their first win less road trip of at least seven games in franchise history. They have also lost 10 in a row, their longest since June 11–20, 1976. As a result, the team carried their worst record (40–69) after 109 games since 1970. The Sox then welcomed into town the New York Yankees for a three-game series. Before the first game of the series, it was announced that Yankees third baseman Alex Rodriguez was given a 211-game suspension for his part in the Biogenesis baseball scandal. Rodriguez appealed the suspension and therefore was activated from the disabled list before the game with the Sox. Rodriguez singled on his first plate appearance of the season and finished the game batting 1 for 4. The Sox beat the Yankees in game 1, 8–1 breaking their 10-game skid. The Sox won game 2 of the series, 3–2 and it was their first 2-game winning streak since July 20–21 when the Sox won two in a row against the Braves. The Sox finished off the series with a 6–5 victory in 12 innings and three-game series sweep of the Yankees. This was the final game at U.S. Cellular Field for Yankees closer Mariano Rivera. Rivera came into the game in the bottom of the 9th inning to try and close the game but the Sox scored sending the game into extras giving Rivera only his third blown save of the season and the first time since 2006 that Rivera had blown a save against the White Sox. The three-game sweep of the Yankees was the first since the Sox swept the Miami Marlins on May 24–26. The Sox then opened up a four games series with the Twins starting with a doubleheader. Before the doubleheader, Alex Ríos was claimed off waivers by the Rangers for Leury García. The Sox lost both games of the doubleheader by scores of 5–7 and 2–3 in 10 innings. They won the third game but lost the fourth game of the series. The Sox then took two of three at home against the division leading Tigers. The Sox traveled to Target Field for a four-game series with the Twins. After losing the first game of the series, the Sox won the next three. It was the first time the Sox won three straight road games since May 15–17 when the Sox defeated the Twins once and then two straight against the Angels. The closed out the road trip with three in Kansas City. The Sox won the first two games of the series by scores of 2–0 and 5–2. After the 5–2 win, the Sox had their longest win streak of the season, 5 games. The Sox finished off with a sweep of the Royals with a 4–3 victory in 12 innings and their 6th straight win. In that game, pitcher Jake Petricka made his MLB debut and also got his first major league victory and Conor Gillaspie hit the game-winning home run in the top of 12th. During the six game win streak, closer Addison Reed saved all six games. The last time a pitcher got a save in six straight games was in 2003 when Éric Gagné of the Los Angeles Dodgers accomplished the feat. The Sox returned home for a three-game series with the Rangers. After losing the first game 11–5, the Sox and Rangers played in the Civil Rights Game in game two which the Sox won 3–2 on a walk-off base hit by rookie catcher Josh Phegley. The Sox then won the rubber match with a 5–2 victory. During the Sox 5–2 victory over the Rangers, pitcher John Danks earned the victory and his younger brother, Jordan Danks, hit the go-ahead home run in the game. According to Elias Sports Bureau, it was the first time since June 5, 1955, that a player homered in support of his brother on the mound, when Kansas City Athletics catcher Billy Shantz homered for his brother Bobby Shantz. The Sox then took two of three against the Houston Astros at home. The Sox finished the month on a 10-game road trip on the east coast starting with three in Boston. The Sox lost their final two games of the month to the Red Sox. The first game they lost by a score of 3–4 to former Cubs pitcher Ryan Dempster and lost the second game to Jake Peavy, who the Sox traded to Boston a month earlier, by a score of 2–7. Despite losing the final two games of the month, the Sox still finished with a winning record during the month with a record of 16–13. It was only their second winning record during a month and their first since May when they went 14–13.

==== September ====
The Sox started the month of September with the last game of a three-game series with the Red Sox. The Sox lost the game 7-6 and got swept by the Red Sox. The Sox then traveled to the Bronx for a three-game series where they were swept by the Yankees. The Sox finished off their 10-game road trip with four in Baltimore. The Sox lost the first three games of the series but won the last game to stop a 9-game losing streak and finished the road trip with a putrid record of 1–9. The Sox returned home to face the division-leading Tigers. The Sox won the first game of the series with Chris Sale outdueling Max Scherzer and prevented Scherzer from reaching his 20th victory of the season. The Sox would go on to lose the final two games of the series. The Sox would then get swept in a four-game series at home against the Indians for the second time this season and third overall. The Sox becomes the first MLB team to get swept in four-game series by a same team three times in one season. The Sox closed out their home stand taking two of three from Minnesota. The Sox traveled to Detroit for a three-game series and lost two of three. In the second game of the series in Detroit, the Sox had a 6–0 lead going to the bottom of the ninth inning before giving up six runs that tied the game. They went on to lose in 12 innings. It was the first time in franchise history that Sox had a lead by six or more runs in the ninth inning or later and lost. They then returned home for one game, a makeup game with the Blue Jays. The Sox won that game 3–2, backed by the first major league home run by Marcus Semien. The Sox closed out their road schedule with a quick two-game series in Cleveland. The Sox lost both games to finish with the franchise-worst 26–55 road record, and finished with a record of 2–17 vs. the Indians this season; they extended their losing streak to 14 straight against the Indians, franchise record against one team. The Sox closed out the 2013 season with a four-game series at home against the Royals. The Sox lost three of four and finished with the third worst record during the 2013 season, with a record of 63–99. It was only the fifth time in White Sox history that they finished with 98 or more losses.

== Game log ==
Legend
	White Sox win
	White Sox loss
	Postponement
**Bold**	White Sox team member

2013 White Sox game log
April (10–15) – Home (7–7) – Road (3–8) – 89 R.S. 106 R.A.

#	Date	Opponent	Score	Win	Loss	Save	Attendance	Time	Record	GB	Box/Streak
1	April 1	Royals	1–0	**Sale** (1–0)	Shields (0–1)	**Reed** (1)	39,012	2:38	1–0	–	W1
2	April 3	Royals	5–2	**Peavy** (1–0)	Santana (0–1)	**Reed** (2)	14,213	2:46	2–0	–	W2
3	April 4	Royals	1–3	Guthrie (1–0)	**Floyd** (0–1)	Holland (1)	15,036	2:45	2–1	–	L1
4	April 5	Mariners	7–8 (10)	Loe (1–0)	**Jones** (0–1)	Wilhelmsen (2)	15,312	3:42	2–2	–	L2
5	April 6	Mariners	4–3	**Veal** (1–0)	Hernández (1–1)	**Reed** (3)	22,461	3:07	3–2	–	W1
6	April 7	Mariners	4–3 (10)	**Reed** (1–0)	Loe (1–1)		18,708	2:52	4–2	–	W2
7	April 9	@ Nationals	7–8	Stammen (2–0)	**Peavy** (1–1)	Soriano (3)	24,412	3:13	4–3	−½	L1
8	April 10	@ Nationals	2–5	Zimmermann (2–0)	**Floyd** (0–2)	Soriano (4)	24,586	2:35	4–4	−1½	L2
9	April 11	@ Nationals	4–7	Haren (1–1)	**Axelrod** (0–1)	Soriano (5)	24,785	3:18	4–5	−2	L3
10	April 12	@ Indians	0–1	Masterson (3–0)	**Crain** (0–1)		11,864	2:19	4–6	−2	L4
11	April 13	@ Indians	4–9	Jiménez (1–1)	**Sale** (1–1)		11,422	2:35	4–7	−2	L5
12	April 14	@ Indians	3–1	**Peavy** (2–1)	Myers (0–2)	**Reed** (4)	11,682	2:48	5–7	−2	W1
13	April 15	@ Blue Jays	3–4	Buehrle (1–0)	**Floyd** (0–3)	Janssen (4)	15,755	2:38	5–8	−2½	L1
14	April 16	@ Blue Jays	4–3	**Lindstrom** (1–0)	Delabar (1–1)	**Reed** (5)	16,131	2:42	6–8	−2½	W1
15	April 17	@ Blue Jays	7–0	**Quintana** (1–0)	Happ (2–1)		15,684	2:34	7–8	−2½	W2
16	April 18	@ Blue Jays	1–3	Dickey (2–2)	**Sale** (1–2)	Janssen (5)	18,015	2:10	7–9	−2½	L1
--	April 19	Twins	7:10pm	PPD, COLD; rescheduled for August 9							
17	April 20	Twins	1–2 (10)	Fien (1–1)	**Santiago** (0–1)	Perkins (4)	22,417	3:34	7–10	−2½	L2
18	April 21	Twins	3–5	Diamond (1–1)	**Lindstrom** (1–1)	Perkins (5)	19,587	2:59	7–11	−3½	L3
19	April 22	Indians	2–3	Masterson (4–1)	**Thornton** (0–1)	Perez (3)	14,950	2:48	7–12	−4	L4
--	April 23	Indians	7:10pm	PPD, RAIN; rescheduled for June 29							
20	April 24	Indians	3–2	**Quintana** (2–0)	McAllister (1–3)	**Reed** (6)	16,765	3:02	8–12	−3	W1
21	April 25	Rays	5–2	**Sale** (2–2)	Hellickson (1–2)	**Reed** (7)	15,056	2:52	9–12	−3	W2
22	April 26	Rays	5–4	**Peavy** (3–1)	Hernández (1–4)	**Reed** (8)	20,008	2:47	10–12	−2½	W3
23	April 27	Rays	4–10	Moore (5–0)	**Floyd** (0–4)		25,270	3:39	10–13	−3½	L1
24	April 28	Rays	3–8	Price (1–2)	**Jones** (0–2)		22,677	3:09	10–14	−4½	L2
25	April 30	@ Rangers	6–10	Darvish (5–1)	**Lindstrom** (1–2)		40,646	3:16	10–15	−5	L3

May (14–13) – Home (6–4) – Road (8–9) – 89 R.S. 106 R.A.

#	Date	Opponent	Score	Win	Loss	Save	Attendance	Time	Record	GB	Box/Streak
26	May 1	@ Rangers	5–2	**Sale** (3–2)	Tepesch (2–2)	**Reed** (9)	34,677	2:56	11–15	−4½	W1
27	May 2	@ Rangers	3–1	**Santiago** (1–1)	Grimm (2–1)	**Reed** (10)	31,199	2:53	12–15	−4	W2
--	May 3	@ Royals	7:10pm	PPD, RAIN; rescheduled for May 6							
28	May 4	@ Royals	0–2	Guthrie (4–0)	**Axelrod** (0–2)		19,957	2:18	12–16	−5½	L1
29	May 5	@ Royals	5–6 (10)	Holland (1–1)	**Omogrosso** (0–1)		16,462	3:36	12–17	−6½	L2
30	May 6	@ Royals	2–1 (11)	**Crain** (1–1)	Herrera (2–3)	**Reed** (11)	15,576	3:14	13–17	−6	W1
31	May 7	@ Mets	0–1 (10)	Parnell (3–0)	**Jones** (0–3)		23,394	2:30	13–18	−6½	L1
32	May 8	@ Mets	6–3	**Peavy** (4–1)	Hefner (0–4)		21,470	3:09	14–18	−5½	W1
33	May 10	Angels	5–7	Kohn (1–0)	**Axelrod** (0–3)	Frieri (6)	22,638	3:35	14–19	−6	L1
34	May 11	Angels	2–3	Williams (2–1)	**Quintana** (2–1)	Frieri (7)	28,774	2:58	14–20	−6	L2
35	May 12	Angels	3–0	**Sale** (4–2)	Wilson (3–2)		22,088	2:32	15–20	−5	W1
36	May 13	@ Twins	3–10	Hernández (2–0)	**Santiago** (1–2)		25,605	2:51	15–21	−6	L1
37	May 14	@ Twins	4–2	**Peavy** (5–1)	Correia (4–3)	**Reed** (12)	32,023	2:44	16–21	−6	W1
38	May 15	@ Twins	9–4	**Axelrod** (1–3)	Pelfrey (3–4)		35,613	3:26	17–21	−5	W2
39	May 16	@ Angels	5–4	**Lindstrom** (2–2)	De La Rosa (1–1)	**Reed** (13)	37,711	3:08	18–21	−4	W3
40	May 17	@ Angels	3–0	**Sale** (5–2)	Wilson (3–3)	**Reed** (14)	37,546	2:48	19–21	−4	W4
41	May 18	@ Angels	9–12	Coello (1–0)	**Jones** (0–4)	Frieri (8)	37,165	3:50	19–22	−5	L1
42	May 19	@ Angels	2–6	Vargas (3–3)	**Peavy** (5–2)	Frieri (9)	38,190	3:04	19–23	−6	L2
43	May 20	Red Sox	6–4	**Axelrod** (2–3)	Lester (6–1)	**Reed** (15)	21,816	2:52	20–23	−6	W1
44	May 21	Red Sox	3–1	**Quintana** (3–1)	Doubront (3–2)	**Reed** (16)	21,984	2:45	21–23	−5	W2
45	May 22	Red Sox	2–6	Buchholz (7–0)	**Santiago** (1–3)		21,298	3:15	21–24	−6	L1
46	May 24	Marlins	4–3 (11)	**Jones** (1–4)	Webb (1–2)		20,393	3:19	22–24	−5	W1
47	May 25	Marlins	2–1	**Peavy** (6–2)	Webb (1–3)		23,705	2:41	23–24	−4	W2
48	May 26	Marlins	5–3	**Axelrod** (3–3)	Sanabia (3–7)	**Reed** (17)	25,464	2:41	24–24	−4	W3
49	May 27	Cubs	0–7	Samardzija (3–6)	**Quintana** (3–2)		30,631	2:25	24–25	−5	L1
--	May 28	Cubs	7:10pm	PPD, RAIN; rescheduled for July 8							
50	May 29	@ Cubs	3–9	Feldman (5–4)	**Danks** (0–1)		31,279	3:09	24–26	−4½	L2
51	May 30	@ Cubs	3–8	Wood (5–2)	**Peavy** (6–3)		31,968	2:56	24–27	−4½	L3
52	May 31	@ Athletics	0–3	Colón (6–2)	**Axelrod** (3–4)		16,416	2:14	24–28	−4½	L4

June (8–19) – Home (4–8) – Road (4–11) – 115 R.S. 131 R.A.

#	Date	Opponent	Score	Win	Loss	Save	Attendance	Time	Record	GB	Box/Streak
53	June 1	@ Athletics	3–4 (10)	Blevins (4–0)	**Santiago** (1–4)		26,646	3:49	24–29	−5½	L5
54	June 2	@ Athletics	0–2	Parker (4–6)	**Sale** (5–3)	Balfour (13)	23,413	3:02	24–30	−5½	L6
55	June 3	@ Mariners	2–4	Saunders (4–5)	**Danks** (0–2)	Wilhelmsen (13)	13,491	2:32	24–31	−6	L7
56	June 4	@ Mariners	4–7	Hernández (7–4)	**Peavy** (6–4)	Wilhelmsen (14)	16,294	2:57	24–32	−7	L8
57	June 5	@ Mariners	7–5 (16)	**Reed** (2–0)	Noesí (0–1)		20,139	5:42	25–32	−6	W1
58	June 6	Athletics	4–5 (10)	Blevins (5–0)	**Thornton** (0–2)	Balfour (14)	21,156	2:57	25–33	−7	L1
59	June 7	Athletics	3–4	Parker (5–6)	**Sale** (5–4)	Balfour (15)	22,861	2:47	25–34	−8	L2
60	June 8	Athletics	4–1	**Danks** (1–2)	Doolittle (3–1)	**Reed** (18)	23,735	2:27	26–34	−8	W1
61	June 9	Athletics	4–2	**Santiago** (2–4)	Griffin (5–5)	**Reed** (19)	31,033	2:39	27–34	−8	W2
62	June 10	Blue Jays	10–6	**Jones** (2–4)	Dickey (5–8)		18,126	3:26	28–34	−7	W3
63	June 11	Blue Jays	5–7 (10)	Cecil (2–0)	**Troncoso** (0–1)	Janssen (13)	20,700	3:17	28–35	−8	L1
--	June 12	Blue Jays	7:10pm	PPD, RAIN; rescheduled for September 23							
64	June 14	@ Astros	1–2	Bédard (2–3)	**Sale** (5–5)	Veras (12)	20,496	2:49	28–36	−8½	L2
65	June 15	@ Astros	3–4	Harrell (5–7)	**Danks** (1–3)	Veras (13)	21,549	2:39	28–37	−8½	L3
66	June 16	@ Astros	4–5	Keuchel (4–3)	**Santiago** (2–5)	Veras (14)	25,829	3:17	28–38	−9½	L4
67	June 17	@ Astros	4–2	**Jones** (3–4)	Norris (5–7)	**Reed** (20)	13,870	3:33	29–38	−9½	W1
68	June 18	@ Twins	5–7	Burton (1–4)	**Troncoso** (0–2)	Perkins (17)	30,387	2:57	29–39	−9½	L1
69	June 19	@ Twins	4–7	Correia (6–4)	**Sale** (5–6)	Perkins (18)	30,003	3:00	29–40	−9½	L2
70	June 20	@ Twins	4–8	Diamond (5–6)	**Danks** (1–4)		35,837	3:06	29–41	−10½	L3
71	June 21	@ Royals	9–1	**Santiago** (3–5)	Guthrie (7–5)		33,830	2:26	30–41	−9½	W1
72	June 22	@ Royals	3–2	**Crain** (2–1)	Crow (3–3)	**Reed** (21)	20,364	3:04	31–41	−9½	W2
73	June 23	@ Royals	6–7	Hochevar (1–1)	**Crain** (2–2)	Holland (16)	18,622	3:22	31–42	−10½	L1
74	June 25	Mets	5–4	**Reed** (3–0)	Hawkins (2–1)		20,789	2:55	32–42	−9½	W1
75	June 26	Mets	0–3	Marcum (1–9)	**Danks** (1–5)	Parnell (13)	18,249	2:28	32–43	−9½	L1
76	June 28	Indians	10–19	Albers (2–0)	**Omogrosso** (0–2)		N/A	4:02	32–44	−10½	L2
77	June 28	Indians	8–9	Langwell (1–0)	**Reed** (3–1)	Pestano (6)	28,628	3:51	32–45	−11	L3
78	June 29	Indians	3–4	Martinez (1–0)	**Crain** (2–3)	Perez (7)	26,289	3:05	32–46	−11	L4
79	June 30	Indians	0–4	Masterson (10–6)	**Sale** (5–7)		27,032	2:29	32–47	−11	L5

July (8–18) – Home (5–9) – Road (3–9) – 92 R.S. 117 R.A.

#	Date	Opponent	Score	Win	Loss	Save	Attendance	Time	Record	GB	Box/Streak
80	July 2	Orioles	5–2	**Danks** (2–5)	Hammel (7–5)	**Reed** (22)	19,746	2:23	33–47	−10½	W1
81	July 3	Orioles	2–4	O'Day (4–0)	**Lindstrom** (2–3)	Johnson (29)	26,001	3:01	33–48	−11½	L1
82	July 4	Orioles	3–2	**Reed** (4–1)	Hunter (3–2)		21,321	2:45	34–48	−11½	W1
83	July 5	@ Rays	3–8	Hellickson (8–3)	**Axelrod** (3–5)		15,825	3:25	34–49	−12½	L1
84	July 6	@ Rays	0–3	Moore (12–3)	**Sale** (5–8)	Rodney (19)	21,047	2:50	34–50	−13½	L2
85	July 7	@ Rays	1–3	Price (3–4)	**Danks** (2–6)		16,832	2:23	34–51	−13½	L3
86	July 8	Cubs	2–8	Garza (5–1)	**Thornton** (0–3)		31,552	3:34	34–52	−14	L4
87	July 9	@ Tigers	11–4	**Quintana** (4–2)	Verlander (9–6)		37,113	3:05	35–52	−13	W1
88	July 10	@ Tigers	5–8	Porcello (6–6)	**Axelrod** (3–6)	Benoit (8)	39,095	3:06	35–53	−14	L1
89	July 11	@ Tigers	6–3	**Sale** (6–8)	Sánchez (7–6)	**Reed** (23)	40,444	3:18	36–53	−13	W1
--	July 12	@ Phillies	6:05pm	PPD, RAIN; rescheduled for July 13							
90	July 13	@ Phillies	5–4 (11)	**Troncoso** (1–2)	Ramirez (0–1)	**Reed** (24)	41,562	3:52	37–53	−12½	W2
91	July 13	@ Phillies	1–2 (13)	Savery (2–0)	**Castro** (0–1)		43,249	3:53	37–54	−13	L1
92	July 14	@ Phillies	3–4 (10)	Bastardo (3–2)	**Purcey** (0–1)		40,151	3:26	37–55	−14	L2
–	July 16	**2013 Major League Baseball All-Star Game** at Citi Field in Queens, New York									
93	July 19	Braves	4–6	Hudson (7–7)	**Danks** (2–7)	Kimbrel (27)	25,613	2:51	37–56	−14	L3
94	July 20	Braves	10–6	**Peavy** (7–4)	Maholm (9–9)		27,294	3:10	38–56	−13	W1
95	July 21	Braves	3–1	**Quintana** (5–2)	Minor (9–5)	**Reed** (25)	27,729	2:37	39–56	−13	W2
96	July 22	Tigers	3–7	Scherzer (14–1)	**Sale** (6–9)		N/A	2:43	39–57	−14	L1
97	July 23	Tigers	2–6	Porcello (7–6)	**Santiago** (3–6)		25,919	3:01	39–58	−15	L2
98	July 24	Tigers	2–6	Sánchez (8–7)	**Danks** (2–8)		26,794	2:55	39–59	−16	L3
99	July 25	Tigers	7–4	**Peavy** (8–4)	Verlander (10–8)	**Reed** (26)	30,348	2:48	40–59	−15	W1
100	July 26	Royals	1–5	Shields (5–7)	**Quintana** (5–3)		18,342	3:00	40–60	−16	L1
101	July 27	Royals	0–1	Davis (5–9)	**Sale** (6–10)	Holland (26)	26,172	2:32	40–61	−17	L2
102	July 28	Royals	2–4 (12)	Crow (7–3)	**Veal** (1–1)	Holland (27)	24,079	3:33	40–62	−18	L3
103	July 29	@ Indians	2–3	Perez (3–1)	**Troncoso** (1–3)		14,868	2:42	40–63	−18½	L4
104	July 30	@ Indians	4–7	Shaw (2–2)	**Veal** (1–2)	Perez (15)	16,437	2:47	40–64	−19½	L5
105	July 31	@ Indians	5–6 (10)	Perez (4–1)	**Axelrod** (3–7)		22,258	3:22	40–65	−20½	L6

August (16–13) – Home (10–6) – Road (6–7) – 117 R.S. 110 R.A.

#	Date	Opponent	Score	Win	Loss	Save	Attendance	Time	Record	GB	Box/Streak
106	August 1	@ Indians	1–6	Masterson (13–7)	**Sale** (6–11)		20,189	2:27	40–66	−21	L7
107	August 2	@ Tigers	1–2	Fister (10–5)	**Santiago** (3–7)	Benoit (11)	41,109	2:07	40–67	−22	L8
108	August 3	@ Tigers	0–3	Scherzer (16–1)	**Danks** (2–9)	Benoit (12)	43,906	2:33	40–68	−23	L9
109	August 4	@ Tigers	2–3 (12)	Rondon (1–1)	**Axelrod** (3–8)		42,513	3:35	40–69	−24	L10
110	August 5	Yankees	8–1	**Quintana** (6–3)	Pettitte (7–9)		27,948	3:13	41–69	−24	W1
111	August 6	Yankees	3–2	**Sale** (7–11)	Kuroda (10–7)	**Reed** (27)	23,826	2:56	42–69	−24	W2
112	August 7	Yankees	6–5 (12)	**Axelrod** (4–8)	Warren (1–2)		25,707	4:01	43–69	−24	W3
113	August 9	Twins	5–7	Duensing (5–1)	**Veal** (1–3)		17,439	3:16	43–70	−25	L1
114	August 9	Twins	2–3 (10)	Duensing (6–1)	**Axelrod** (4–9)	Perkins (28)	23,804	3:18	43–71	−25	L2
115	August 10	Twins	5–4	**Purcey** (1–1)	Pelfrey (4–10)	**Reed** (28)	24,529	3:29	44–71	−25	W1
116	August 11	Twins	2–5	Correia (8–8)	**Quintana** (6–4)		26,344	2:52	44–72	−25	L1
117	August 12	Tigers	6–2	**Sale** (8–11)	Fister (10–6)		19,590	2:23	45–72	−24	W1
118	August 13	Tigers	4–3 (11)	**Reed** (5–1)	Bonderman (2–4)		22,292	4:14	46–72	−23	W2
119	August 14	Tigers	4–6	Porcello (9–6)	**Danks** (2–10)	Benoit (15)	20,058	3:06	46–73	−24	L1
120	August 15	@ Twins	3–4	Burton (2–6)	**Troncoso** (1–4)		32,851	2:47	46–74	−25	L2
121	August 16	@ Twins	5–2	**Quintana** (7–4)	Correia (8–9)	**Reed** (29)	28,834	3:04	47–74	−23½	W1
122	August 17	@ Twins	8–5	**Sale** (9–11)	Albers (2–1)	**Reed** (30)	36,833	2:49	48–74	−23½	W2
123	August 18	@ Twins	5–2	**Santiago** (4–7)	Deduno (7–7)	**Reed** (31)	32,905	2:59	49–74	−23½	W3
124	August 20	@ Royals	2–0	**Danks** (3–10)	Santana (8–7)	**Reed** (32)	13,060	2:35	50–74	−22½	W4
125	August 21	@ Royals	5–2	**Rienzo** (1–0)	Guthrie (12–10)	**Reed** (33)	13,083	3:06	51–74	−22½	W5
126	August 22	@ Royals	4–3 (12)	**Petricka** (1–0)	Hochevar (3–2)	**Reed** (34)	13,363	3:49	52–74	−21½	W6
127	August 23	Rangers	5–11	Pérez (7–3)	**Sale** (9–12)		31,891	2:52	52–75	−22½	L1
128	August 24	Rangers	3–2	**Jones** (4–4)	Scheppers (5–2)		22,079	3:08	53–75	−22½	W1
129	August 25	Rangers	5–2	**Danks** (4–10)	Garza (9–3)	**Reed** (35)	25,960	2:47	54–75	−22½	W2
130	August 26	Astros	8–10	Martínez (1–0)	**Reed** (5–2)	Lyles (1)	13,404	3:30	54–76	−22½	L1
131	August 27	Astros	4–3	**Veal** (2–3)	Bédard (3–10)	**Reed** (36)	15,491	3:10	55–76	−21½	W1
132	August 28	Astros	6–1	**Sale** (10–12)	Harrell (6–15)		15,961	2:44	56–76	−20½	W2
133	August 30	@ Red Sox	3–4	Dempster (7–9)	**Santiago** (4–8)	Uehara (15)	36,063	3:09	56–77	−21½	L1
134	August 31	@ Red Sox	2–7	Peavy (11–5)	**Danks** (4–11)		37,363	3:11	56–78	−22½	L2

September (7–21) – Home (5–10) – Road (2–11) – 88 R.S. 131 R.A.

#	Date	Opponent	Score	Win	Loss	Save	Attendance	Time	Record	GB	Box/Streak
135	September 1	@ Red Sox	6–7	Workman (4–2)	**Rienzo** (1–1)	Uehara (16)	37,053	3:39	56–79	−22½	L3
136	September 2	@ Yankees	1–9	Huff (2–0)	**Quintana** (7–5)		40,125	2:54	56–80	−23½	L4
137	September 3	@ Yankees	4–6	Logan (5–2)	**Jones** (4–5)	Rivera (40)	33,215	3:06	56–81	−23½	L5
138	September 4	@ Yankees	5–6	Sabathia (13–11)	**Johnson** (0–1)	Rivera (41)	36,082	2:53	56–82	−23½	L6
139	September 5	@ Orioles	1–3	González (9–7)	**Quintana** (7–6)	Johnson (42)	17,383	2:34	56–83	−24½	L7
140	September 6	@ Orioles	0–4	Feldman (12–10)	**Danks** (4–12)		26,253	2:26	56–84	−25½	L8
141	September 7	@ Orioles	3–4 (10)	Hunter (4–3)	**Reed** (5–3)		23,653	3:39	56–85	−25½	L9
142	September 8	@ Orioles	4–2	**Rienzo** (2–1)	Norris (10–11)	**Reed** (37)	32,042	3:05	57–85	−24½	W1
143	September 9	Tigers	5–1	**Sale** (11–12)	Scherzer (19–3)		17,193	2:40	58–85	−23½	W2
144	September 10	Tigers	1–9	Porcello (12–8)	**Johnson** (0–2)		19,172	2:52	58–86	−24½	L1
145	September 11	Tigers	0–1	Sánchez (14–7)	**Lindstrom** (2–4)	Benoit (18)	15,799	3:16	58–87	−25½	L2
146	September 12	Indians	3–14	Kluber (9–5)	**Danks** (4–13)		14,375	3:36	58–88	−26	L3
147	September 13	Indians	1–3	Shaw (4–3)	**Santiago** (4–9)	Perez (24)	15,533	3:28	58–89	−27	L4
148	September 14	Indians	1–8	Jiménez (12–9)	**Rienzo** (2–2)		28,024	3:00	58–90	−27	L5
149	September 15	Indians	1–7	McAllister (8–9)	**Sale** (11–13)		18,631	2:39	58–91	−28	L6
150	September 16	Twins	12–1	**Johnson** (1–2)	Hendriks (1–3)		15,018	3:16	59–91	−28	W1
151	September 17	Twins	4–3	**Quintana** (8–6)	Pelfrey (5–13)	**Reed** (38)	15,964	3:33	60–91	−28	W2
152	September 18	Twins	3–4	Diamond (6–11)	**Danks** (4–14)	Perkins (36)	14,520	2:38	60–92	−28	L1
153	September 20	@ Tigers	5–12	Scherzer (20–3)	**Axelrod** (4–10)		39,643	3:32	60–93	−29½	L2
154	September 21	@ Tigers	6–7 (12)	Alburquerque (4–3)	**Petricka** (1–1)		41,772	4:02	60–94	−30½	L3
155	September 22	@ Tigers	6–3	**Johnson** (2–2)	Sánchez (14–8)		41,749	3:08	61–94	−29½	W1
156	September 23	Blue Jays	3–2	**Quintana** (9–6)	Happ (4–7)	**Reed** (39)	19,122	2:46	62–94	−28½	W2
157	September 24	@ Indians	4–5	Shaw (6–3)	**Reed** (5–4)		21,083	3:05	62–95	−29½	L1
158	September 25	@ Indians	2–7	Salazar (2–3)	**Axelrod** (4–11)		30,942	3:06	62–96	−30½	L2
159	September 26	Royals	2–3	Guthrie (15–12)	**Rienzo** (2–3)	Holland (46)	16,434	2:32	62–97	−31	L3
160	September 27	Royals	1–6	Shields (13–9)	**Sale** (11–14)		24,474	2:37	62–98	−31	L4
161	September 28	Royals	6–5	**Johnson** (3–2)	Ventura (0–1)	**Reed** (40)	22,235	2:58	63–98	−30	W1
162	September 29	Royals	1–4	Chen (9–4)	**Quintana** (9–7)	Holland (47)	22,633	2:34	63–99	−30	L1

== Roster ==
2013 Chicago White Sox
Roster
Pitchers: 33 Dylan Axelrod; 55 Simón Castro; 26 Jesse Crain; 50 John Danks; 34 Gavin Floyd; 54 Deunte Heath; 45 Erik Johnson; 65 Nate Jones; 61 Charles Leesman; 27 Matt Lindstrom; 48 Brian Omogrosso; 44 Jake Peavy; 68 Jake Petricka; 41 David Purcey; 62 José Quintana; 43 Addison Reed; 64 Andre Rienzo; 49 Chris Sale; 53 Hector Santiago; 37 Matt Thornton; 40 Ramón Troncoso; 46 Donnie Veal; 60 Daniel Webb	Catchers: 39 Bryan Anderson; 21 Tyler Flowers; 38 Héctor Giménez; 38 Miguel González; 36 Josh Phegley; Infielders: 15 Gordon Beckham; 32 Adam Dunn; 28 Leury García; 12 Conor Gillaspie; 1 Tyler Greene; 7 Jeff Keppinger; 14 Paul Konerko; 22 Brent Morel; 10 Alexei Ramírez; 5 Ángel Sánchez; 5 Marcus Semien; Outfielders: 20 Jordan Danks; 30 Alejandro De Aza; 26 Avisaíl García; 51 Alex Ríos; 18 Blake Tekotte; 24 Dayán Viciedo; 39 Casper Wells; 28 DeWayne Wise	Manager: 23 Robin Ventura; Coaches: 3 Harold Baines (assistant hitting); 17 Daryl Boston (first base); 99 Don Cooper (pitching); 31 Jeff Manto (hitting); 47 Joe McEwing (third base); 8 Mark Parent (bench); 59 Mark Salas (bullpen catcher); 58 Bobby Thigpen (bullpen)

== Player stats ==
=== Batting ===
Note: G = Games played; AB = At bats; R = Runs scored; H = Hits; 2B = Doubles; 3B = Triples; HR = Home runs; RBI = Runs batted in; BB = Base on balls; SO = Strikeouts; AVG = Batting average; SB = Stolen bases

Player	G	AB	R	H	2B	3B	HR	RBI	BB	SO	AVG	SB
Bryan Anderson, C	10	18	1	1	1	0	0	2	1	5	.056	0
Gordon Beckham, 2B	103	371	46	99	22	1	5	24	28	56	.267	5
Jordan Danks, OF	79	160	15	37	7	0	5	12	18	57	.231	7
Alejandro De Aza, CF, LF	153	607	84	160	27	4	17	62	50	147	.264	20
Adam Dunn, DH, 1B, LF	149	525	60	115	15	0	34	86	76	189	.219	1
Tyler Flowers, C	84	256	24	50	11	0	10	24	14	94	.195	0
Avisaíl García, RF, CF	42	161	19	49	4	2	5	21	5	38	.304	3
Leury García, 2B, CF, SS, 3B	20	49	2	10	1	0	0	1	4	18	.204	6
Conor Gillaspie, 3B, 1B	134	408	46	100	14	3	13	40	37	79	.245	0
Héctor Giménez, C	26	68	8	13	4	0	2	10	7	22	.191	0
Miguel González, C	5	9	0	2	0	0	0	0	0	3	.222	0
Tyler Greene, 2B, SS	22	54	7	12	2	1	1	3	3	19	.222	0
Jeff Keppinger, 3B, 2B, 1B, DH	117	423	38	107	13	1	4	40	20	41	.253	0
Paul Konerko, 1B, DH	126	467	41	114	16	0	12	54	45	74	.244	0
Brent Morel, 3B, 1B	12	25	3	5	0	0	0	1	5	7	.200	1
Josh Phegley, C	65	204	14	42	7	0	4	22	5	41	.206	2
Alexei Ramírez, SS	158	637	68	181	39	2	6	48	26	68	.284	30
Alex Ríos, RF	109	430	57	119	22	2	12	55	32	78	.277	26
Ángel Sánchez, 2B	1	2	0	0	0	0	0	0	0	0	.000	0
Marcus Semien, 3B, 2B, SS	21	69	7	18	4	0	2	7	1	22	.261	2
Blake Tekotte, OF	20	31	4	7	1	0	1	2	3	9	.226	1
Dayán Viciedo, LF, DH	124	441	43	117	23	3	14	56	24	98	.265	0
Casper Wells, OF	37	66	4	11	1	0	0	1	5	22	.167	0
DeWayne Wise, OF	30	64	6	15	3	0	1	3	2	14	.234	1
Non-Pitcher Totals	162	5545	597	1384	237	19	148	574	411	1201	.250	105
Team totals	162	5563	598	1385	237	19	148	574	411	1207	.249	105

==== Other batters ====
Note: G = Games played; AB = At bats; R = Runs scored; H = Hits; 2B = Doubles; 3B = Triples; HR = Home runs; RBI = Runs batted in; BB = Base on balls; SO = Strikeouts; AVG = Batting average; SB = Stolen bases

Player	G	AB	R	H	2B	3B	HR	RBI	BB	SO	AVG	SB
Dylan Axelrod, P	1	2	1	1	0	0	0	0	0	1	.500	0
John Danks, P	2	2	0	0	0	0	0	0	0	1	.000	0
Gavin Floyd, P	1	2	0	0	0	0	0	0	0	2	.000	0
Jake Peavy, P	3	6	0	0	0	0	0	0	0	0	.000	0
José Quintana, P	1	2	0	0	0	0	0	0	0	1	.000	0
Hector Santiago, P	5	4	0	0	0	0	0	0	0	1	.000	0

=== Pitching ===
Note: W = Wins; L = Losses; ERA = Earned run average; G = Games pitched; GS = Games started; SV = Saves; IP = Innings pitched; H = Hits allowed; R = Runs allowed; ER = Earned runs allowed; HR = Home runs allowed; BB = Walks allowed; K = Strikeouts

Player	W	L	ERA	G	GS	SV	IP	H	R	ER	HR	BB	K
Dylan Axelrod	4	11	5.68	30	20	0	128.1	170	89	81	24	43	73
Simón Castro	0	1	2.70	4	0	0	6.2	5	2	2	1	3	6
Jesse Crain	2	3	0.74	38	0	0	36.2	31	6	3	0	11	46
John Danks	4	14	4.75	22	22	0	138.1	151	81	73	28	27	89
Gavin Floyd	0	4	5.18	5	5	0	24.1	27	15	14	4	12	25
Deunte Heath	0	0	11.74	5	0	0	7.2	8	10	10	2	12	3
Erik Johnson	3	2	3.25	5	5	0	27.2	32	16	10	5	11	18
Nate Jones	4	5	4.15	70	0	0	78.0	69	40	36	5	26	89
Charles Leesman	0	0	7.04	8	1	0	15.1	16	14	12	2	16	13
Matt Lindstrom	2	4	3.12	76	0	0	60.2	64	23	21	2	23	46
Brian Omogrosso	0	2	9.37	12	0	0	16.1	28	18	17	2	9	16
Jake Peavy	8	4	4.28	13	13	0	80.0	74	41	38	14	17	76
Jake Petricka	1	1	3.26	16	0	0	19.1	20	7	7	0	10	10
David Purcey	1	1	2.13	24	0	0	25.1	19	7	6	2	17	23
José Quintana	9	7	3.51	33	33	0	200.0	188	83	78	23	56	164
Addison Reed	5	4	3.79	68	0	40	71.1	56	31	30	6	23	72
Andre Rienzo	2	3	4.82	10	10	0	56.0	55	34	30	11	28	38
Chris Sale	11	14	3.07	30	30	0	214.1	184	81	73	23	46	226
Hector Santiago	4	9	3.56	34	23	0	149.0	137	69	59	17	72	137
Matt Thornton	0	3	3.86	40	0	0	28.0	25	14	12	4	10	21
Ramón Troncoso	1	4	4.50	29	0	0	30.0	30	22	15	4	16	18
Donnie Veal	2	3	4.60	50	0	0	29.1	26	16	15	3	16	29
Daniel Webb	0	0	3.18	9	0	0	11.1	9	4	4	0	4	10
Casper Wells	0	0	0.00	1	0	0	1.0	0	0	0	0	1	1
Team totals	63	99	3.98	162	162	40	1455.0	1424	723	643	182	509	1249

== Farm system ==
Level	Team	League	Manager
AAA	Charlotte Knights	International League	Joel Skinner
AA	Birmingham Barons	Southern League	Julio Vinas
A	Winston-Salem Dash	Carolina League	Ryan Newman
A	Kannapolis Intimidators	South Atlantic League	Tommy Thompson
Rookie	Bristol White Sox	Appalachian League	Mike Gellinger
Rookie	Great Falls Voyagers	Pioneer League	Pete Rose Jr.

LEAGUE CHAMPIONS: Birmingham
