= Brian Omogrosso =

American baseball player (born 1984)

- Pitcher
- Born: April 26, 1984 (age 42); Beaver Falls, Pennsylvania, U.S.
- Batted: Right Threw: Right

MLB debut
- July 3, 2012, for the Chicago White Sox

Last MLB appearance
- June 28, 2013, for the Chicago White Sox

MLB statistics
- Win–loss record: 0–2
- Earned run average: 5.54
- Strikeouts: 34
- Stats at Baseball Reference

Teams
- Chicago White Sox (2012–2013)

Brian Scott Omogrosso (born April 26, 1984) is an American former professional baseball pitcher. He played in Major League Baseball (MLB) for the Chicago White Sox.

== Career ==
Prior to playing professionally, he attended Blackhawk High School in Beaver Falls, Pennsylvania and then Indiana State University.

=== Minor leagues ===
Omogrosso was drafted by the Chicago White Sox in the sixth round, with the 195th overall selection, of the 2006 Major League Baseball draft.

Omogrosso began his professional career in 2006 with the Kannapolis Intimidators, going 1–2 with a 3.19 ERA in 22 relief appearances. With the Winston-Salem Warthogs in 2007, Omogrosso went 8–8 with a 3.74 ERA in 40 games (14 starts), striking out 108 batters in 120 1/3 innings. In 2008, he pitched for the Birmingham Barons, going 2–3 with a 3.69 ERA in 17 games (five starts). He split 2009 between the Barons and the Charlotte Knights, going a combined 7–2 with a 5.03 ERA in 17 games (13 starts). He missed most of the 2010 season while on the minor league disabled list.

=== Major leagues ===
On June 29, 2012, Omogrosso was called up from Charlotte to replace the injured Brian Bruney. Four days later, Omogrosso made his Major league debut during a 19–2 win over the Texas Rangers. After his 5th appearance, he was optioned to make room for the return of Jesse Crain. Omogrosso returned as a September call-up, and pitched solidly to finish the season. In 17 major league appearances, he had a 2.57 ERA and struck out 18 in 21 innings.

Omogrosso began the season with Charlotte, but was recalled on May 1 to replace Donnie Veal. After pitching 3 consecutive games, he was optioned to Charlotte on June 5, but was recalled on the June 21. He gave up 9 runs in an outing against the Cleveland Indians, and was optioned June 29. After being placed on the disabled list on July 10, he underwent season-ending elbow surgery on August 6, ending his season. Omogrosso was removed from the 40-man roster and sent outright to the Triple-A Charlotte Knights on October 3, 2013, and elected free agency on October 6. He was re-signed in January 2014. In April 2014 he was released.

=== Bridgeport Bluefish ===
On April 18, 2014, Omogrosso signed with the Bridgeport Bluefish of the Atlantic League of Professional Baseball. In 7 games for the Bluefish, he struggled to an 0–3 record and 13.50 ERA with 7 strikeouts across 6 innings of relief. Omogrosso retired from professional baseball on May 27.

== Pitching style ==
Omogrosso throws five pitches, leading with a four-seam fastball at 93–96 mph. He also has a slider (mid 80s), a curveball (upper 70s), a changeup (upper 80s), and an occasional two-seam fastball. The slider is mostly used against right-handers, while the changeup is used mostly against lefties. The curve is a common two-strike pitch against hitters of both sides.
