= Deunte Heath =

American baseball player (born 1985)

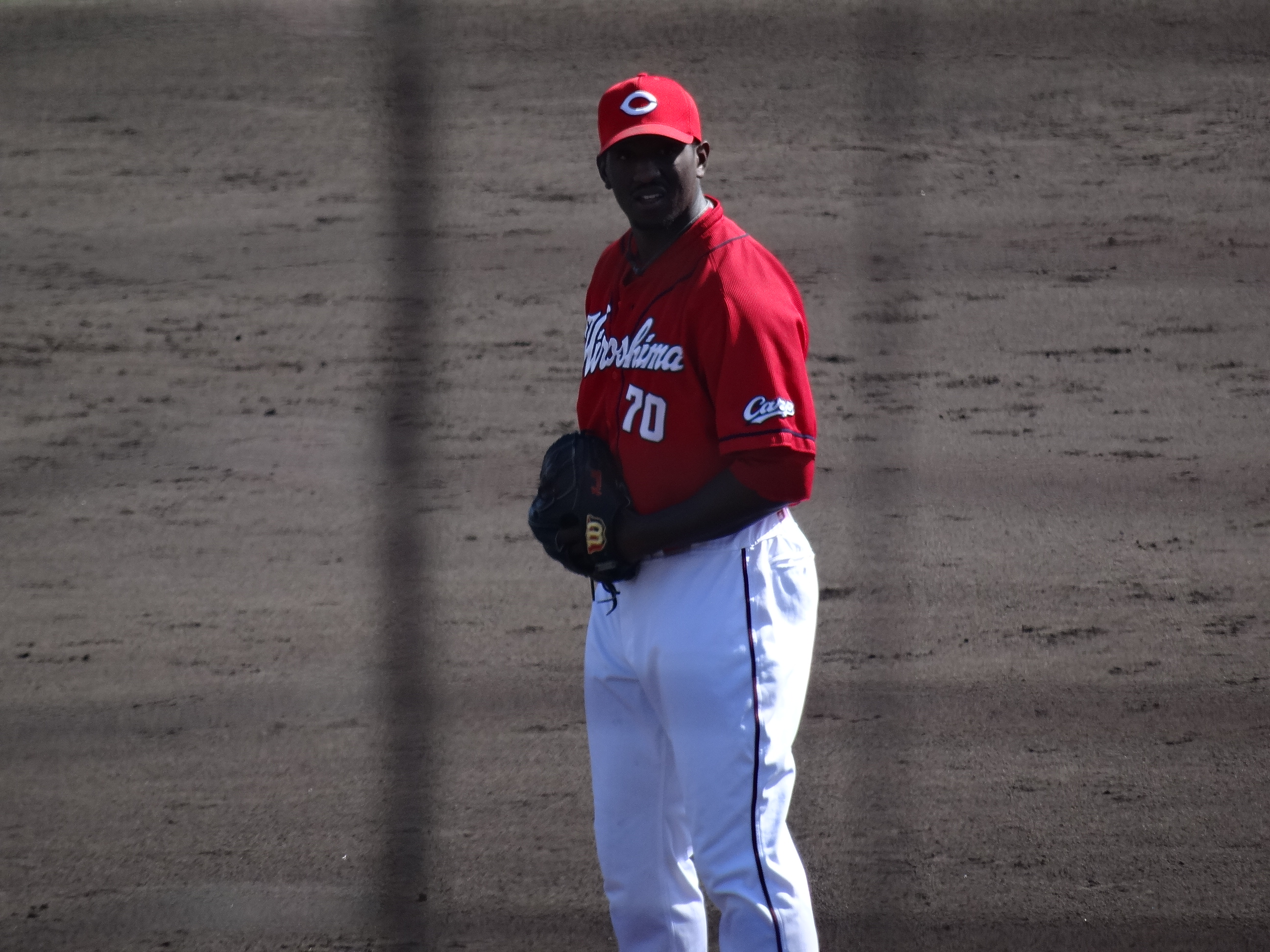
- Heath with the Hiroshima Toyo Carp
- Pitcher
- Born: August 28, 1985 (age 40); Atlanta, Georgia, U.S.
- Batted: Right Threw: Right

Professional debut
- MLB: September 1, 2012, for the Chicago White Sox
- NPB: August 24, 2014, for the Hiroshima Toyo Carp

Last appearance
- MLB: June 19, 2013, for the Chicago White Sox
- NPB: September 14, 2019, for the Saitama Seibu Lions

MLB statistics
- Win–loss record: 0–0
- Earned run average: 10.24
- Strikeouts: 4

NPB statistics
- Win–loss record: 12–10
- Earned run average: 2.66
- Strikeouts: 181
- Stats at Baseball Reference

Teams
- Chicago White Sox (2012–2013); Hiroshima Toyo Carp (2014–2015); Saitama Seibu Lions (2018–2019)

Deunte Raymon Heath (born August 28, 1985) is an American former professional baseball pitcher. He played in Major League Baseball (MLB) for the Chicago White Sox, and in Nippon Professional Baseball (NPB) for the Hiroshima Toyo Carp and Saitama Seibu Lions. He made his MLB debut in 2012.

== Early life ==
Heath went to Newton County High School and was drafted in the 27th round, 799th overall, as a senior by the New York Mets in 2003. He did not sign, and went on to Lake City Community College. In his freshman year of 2004, he got 6 wins and was named Second-Team All-Mid Florida Conference. He was drafted that year by the Tampa Bay Devil Rays in the 25th round, 735th overall, 13 selections before Rays outfielder Justin Ruggiano. However, he did not sign and returned to Lake City CC. In his sophomore year, he got 4 wins and was rated as the 146th best prospect for the 2005 MLB Draft by Baseball America. In that draft, he was selected by the Los Angeles Angels of Anaheim in the 23rd round, 703rd overall, 2 selections before Phillies pitcher David Herndon. Once again, Heath did not sign, but he did transfer to the University of Tennessee. In his junior year, he went 4-3 with a 3.86 ERA.

== Professional career ==
=== Atlanta Braves ===
Heath was drafted by the Atlanta Braves in the 19th round, with the 580th overall, of the 2006 Major League Baseball draft.

Heath was assigned to the Single–A Rome Braves, where he went 2–3 with a 2.03 ERA before being promoted to the High–A Myrtle Beach Pelicans, where he went 2–4 with a 5.82 ERA. He started 2007 with Myrtle Beach, where he went an impressive 9-2 with a 3.11 ERA before being promoted to the Double–A Mississippi Braves, where he went 4–5 with a 5.56 ERA. Heath started 2008 with Mississippi, going 2–5 with a 4.16 ERA before being promoted to Triple–A Gwinnett Braves, where he went 0–1 with a 9.64 ERA. Heath was released by the Braves organization on April 4, 2010. He played the offseason in the Arizona Fall League with the Mesa Solar Sox, appearing in 10 games with an 8.31 ERA.

=== Chicago White Sox ===
On April 5, 2010, Heath signed a minor league contract with the Chicago White Sox. He played 2010 with the Double–A Birmingham Barons, going 2–4 with a 3.12 ERA exclusively in relief. He played all of 2011 with the Triple–A Charlotte Knights, where he went 4–7 with a 4.73 ERA. On November 18, 2011, the White Sox added Heath to their 40-man roster to protect him from the Rule 5 draft.

On July 4, 2012, Heath was called up by the White Sox to replace the injured Jesse Crain. He was returned to Charlotte on July 8, without having made an appearance for the White Sox, briefly becoming a phantom ballplayer. Heath was recalled on September 1, and made 3 appearances for Chicago, recording a 4.50 ERA with 1 strikeout in 2 innings.

On June 6, 2013, Heath was promoted to the major leagues to take the place of Brian Omogrosso, who was optioned to Charlotte. In 5 games for the White Sox in 2013, he struggled to an 11.74 ERA with 3 strikeouts over 7 2/3 innings pitched.

On February 7, 2014, Heath was removed from the 40–man roster and sent outright to Triple–A Charlotte. In 22 appearances (8 starts) for Charlotte, he logged a 5–1 record and 3.22 ERA with 73 strikeouts across 64 1/3 innings pitched. Heath was released by the White Sox organization on July 17.

=== Vaqueros Laguna ===
On April 15, 2016, Heath signed with the Vaqueros Laguna of the Mexican League. In 15 appearances for Laguna, he compiled an 0–2 record and 1.08 ERA with 19 strikeouts across 16 2/3 innings pitched.

=== Pericos de Puebla ===
On May 17, 2016, Heath was traded to the Pericos de Puebla. He served as the team's closer in 2016. In 30 games for Puebla, he logged a 3–3 record and 4.25 ERA with 32 strikeouts across 29 2/3 innings of relief. Heath became a free agent following the season.

On January 2, 2017, Heath signed a minor league contract with the Cincinnati Reds organization. He was released prior to the start of the season on March 28.

On March 28, 2017, Heath signed with the Pericos de Puebla of the Mexican League. In 38 games for the team, he registered a 3–2 record and 3.30 ERA with 66 strikeouts and 20 saves across 46 1/3 innings pitched. Heath became a free agent following the season.

=== Toyama Thunderbirds ===
On March 9, 2018, Heath signed with the Toyama Thunderbirds of the independent Baseball Challenge League of Japan.

=== Saitama Seibu Lions ===
On May 10, 2018, Heath was traded to the Saitama Seibu Lions of Nippon Professional Baseball. In 42 appearances for the team, he logged a 4–1 record and 2.50 ERA with 53 strikeouts and 13 saves across 39 2/3 innings of work.

Heath made 34 appearances for Seibu in 2019, compiling a 2–3 record and 3.73 ERA with 34 strikeouts across 31 1/3 innings pitched. On November 13, 2019, Heath was placed on waivers by the Lions. He became a free agent on November 20.

=== Acereros de Monclova ===
On May 12, 2022, Heath signed with the Acereros de Monclova of the Mexican League. In 25 games for Monclova, he posted a 3–0 record and 2.84 ERA with 33 strikeouts across 25 1/3 innings of relief.

Heath made one appearance for the team in 2023, and didn't record an out after giving up two hits, two walks, and four earned runs.

=== Saraperos de Salitllo ===
On April 25, 2023, Heath's rights were traded to the Saraperos de Saltillo. In 41 appearances for Saltillo, he compiled a 7–2 record and 2.91 ERA with 50 strikeouts over 46 1/3 innings of work.

On May 15, 2024, Heath retired from professional baseball.
