= Jordan Danks =

American baseball player (born 1986)

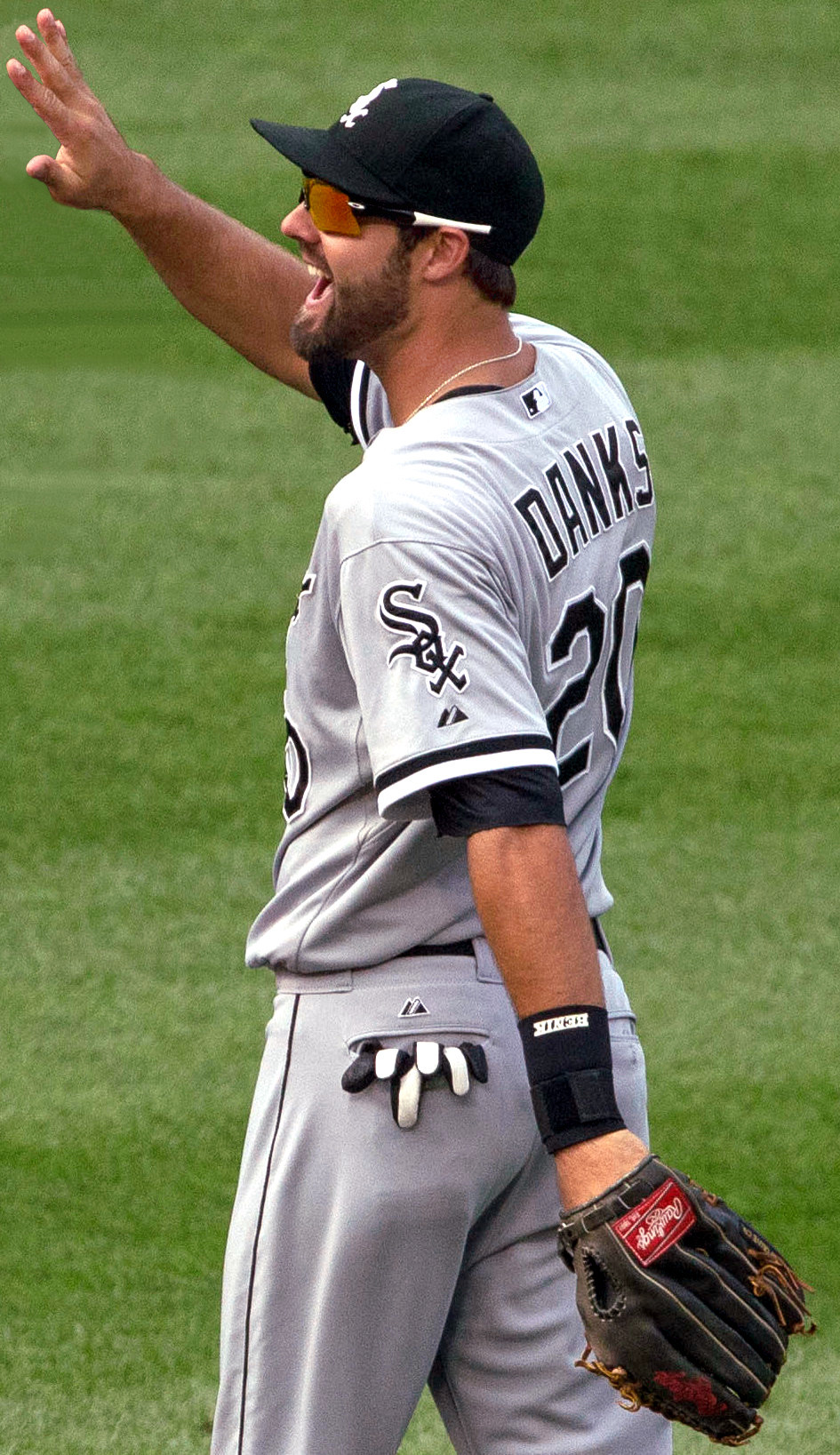
- Danks with the Chicago White Sox in 2013
- Outfielder
- Born: August 7, 1986 (age 39); Austin, Texas, U.S.
- Batted: Left Threw: Right

MLB debut
- June 7, 2012, for the Chicago White Sox

Last MLB appearance
- August 6, 2015, for the Philadelphia Phillies

MLB statistics
- Batting average: .224
- Home runs: 8
- Runs batted in: 26
- Stats at Baseball Reference

Teams
- Chicago White Sox (2012–2014); Philadelphia Phillies (2015)
Medals
Men's baseball
Representing United States
Pan American Games
Silver medal – second place	2011 Guadalajara	National team

Jordan Cooper Danks (born August 7, 1986) is an American former professional baseball outfielder. He played Major League Baseball (MLB) for the Chicago White Sox and Philadelphia Phillies.

== Early life ==
Danks graduated from Round Rock High School in Texas in 2005. He was drafted in the 19th round in the 2005 MLB draft by White Sox, but chose instead to attend the University of Texas at Austin and play for the Texas Longhorns baseball team. Danks was drafted again by the White Sox in the 2008 MLB draft, this time in the 7th round. Jordan is the younger brother of former White Sox starting pitcher John Danks.

== Professional career ==
=== Chicago White Sox ===
On June 7, 2012, Danks made his MLB debut entering the game in the eighth inning as a pinch runner for Paul Konerko in a game against the Toronto Blue Jays. On June 8, Danks recorded his first MLB hit, a single off of Wesley Wright, during an 8–3 loss to the Houston Astros. On August 10, Danks recorded his first major league home run, a walk-off, off of Pat Neshek in a 4–3 win over the Oakland Athletics. Coming into spring training for the 2013 season, Danks was competing for the fourth outfielder spot on the White Sox opening day roster. Danks eventually lost out to DeWayne Wise and was sent to Triple A Charlotte to start the season. Danks was then called up on April 17, 2013 optioning Deunte Heath to Triple A. White Sox manager Robin Ventura said he wanted to bring Danks up because it gave him more options late in games to have Danks pinch-hit, pinch-run, defensive replacement and some spot starts against right-handed pitchers.

On August 25, 2013, during a 5-2 victory over the Texas Rangers his brother, John Danks, was the winning pitcher and Jordan hit a go-ahead home run. According to Elias Sports Bureau, it was the first time since June 5, 1955, that a player homered in support of his brother pitching, when Kansas City catcher Billy Shantz homered in support of his brother Bobby Shantz.

Danks was designated for assignment by the White Sox on January 8, 2015.

=== Philadelphia Phillies ===
Danks was claimed off waivers by the Philadelphia Phillies on January 16, 2015. He appeared in 4 games for Philadelphia, going 0–for–4. On October 7, Danks was removed from the 40–man roster and sent outright to the Triple–A Lehigh Valley IronPigs.

=== Texas Rangers ===
Danks and the Texas Rangers agreed to a minor league contract on January 19, 2016. He was released by the Rangers in April.
