= Erik Johnson (pitcher) =

American baseball player (born 1989)

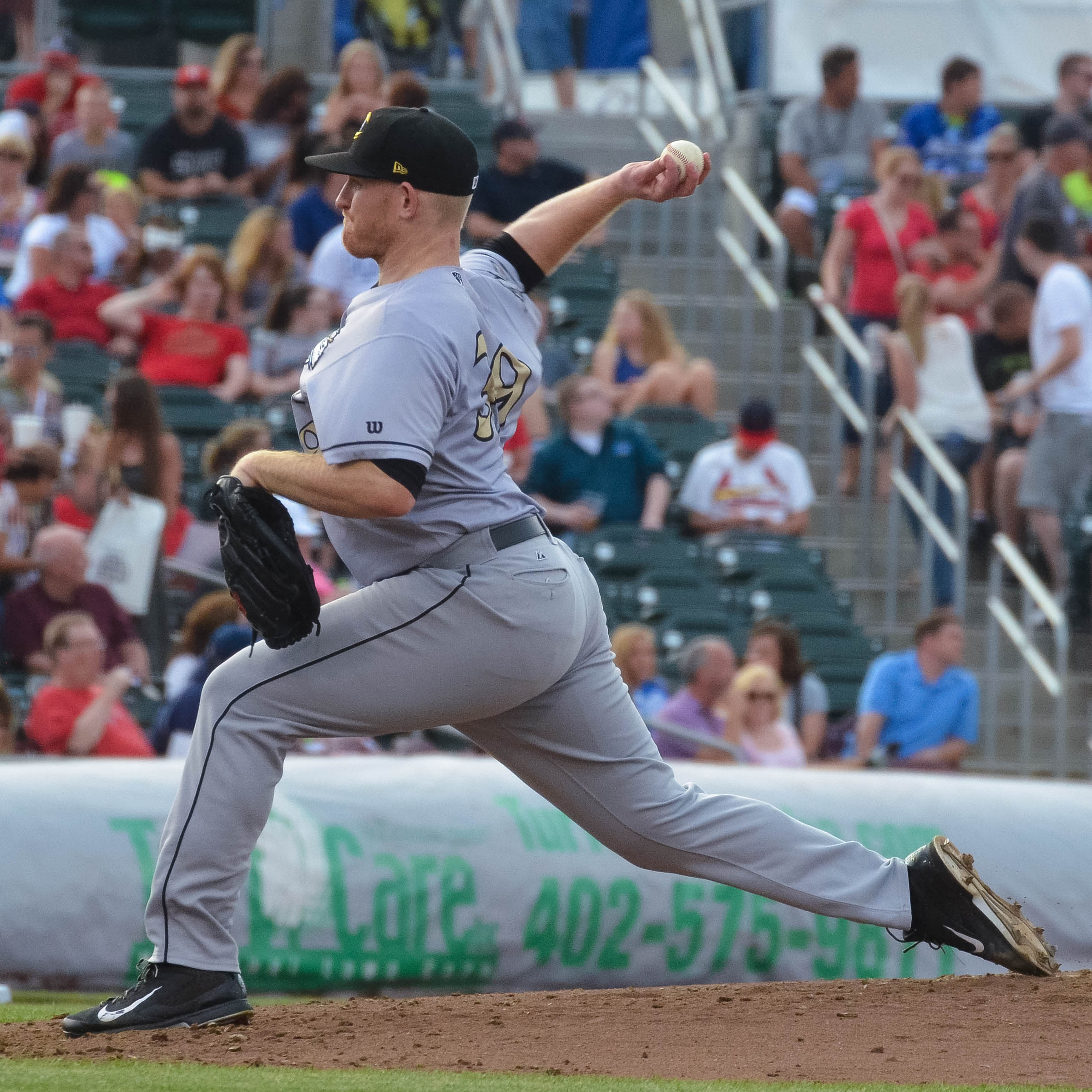
- Johnson at the 2015 Triple-A All-Star Game
- Pitcher
- Born: December 30, 1989 (age 36); Mountain View, California, U.S.
- Batted: Right Threw: Right

MLB debut
- September 4, 2013, for the Chicago White Sox

Last appearance
- June 28, 2016, for the San Diego Padres

MLB statistics
- Win–loss record: 7–10
- Earned run average: 5.28
- Strikeouts: 87
- Stats at Baseball Reference

Teams
- Chicago White Sox (2013–2016); San Diego Padres (2016)

Erik Craig Johnson (born December 30, 1989) is an American former professional baseball pitcher. He played in Major League Baseball (MLB) for the Chicago White Sox and San Diego Padres.

== Professional career ==
=== Chicago White Sox ===
Johnson played college baseball at University of California, Berkeley and was drafted in the 2nd round by the Chicago White Sox during the 2011 MLB draft. He started his career with the Rookie-Level Great Falls Voyagers in 2011. He only pitched in two games and two innings during the 2011 season. In 2012, Johnson started the season with Single–A Kannapolis Intimidators but was later promoted to High–A Winston-Salem Dash.

Johnson finished the 2012 season with a combined record of 6–5 during 17 starts, 92 1/3 innings, 2.53 ERA, 82 hits, 29 walks and 87 strikeouts. At the start of the 2013 season, Johnson was ranked the White Sox #3 prospect. He started the season at Double-A Birmingham Barons. After going 8–2 in 14 starts, 84 2/3 innings, 2.23 ERA, 57 hits, 21 walks and 74 strikeouts, he was promoted to Triple-A Charlotte Knights.

Johnson made his MLB debut with the White Sox on September 4, 2013. He made 5 starts during his rookie campaign, recording a 3.25 ERA with 17 strikeouts across 27 2/3 innings pitched. Johnson spent the majority of 2014 in Charlotte, but made 5 more starts for the White Sox, struggling to a 6.46 ERA with 18 strikeouts across 23 2/3 innings.

Johnson spent the 2015 campaign largely in Charlotte, compiling an 11–8 record and 2.37 ERA with 136 strikeouts across 132 2/3 innings. In 6 starts for Chicago, he posted a 3–1 record and 3.34 ERA with 30 strikeouts. Johnson made only two starts for the White Sox to begin the 2016 season, and struggled to a 6.94 ERA with 11 strikeouts in 11 2/3 innings of work.

=== San Diego Padres ===
On June 4, 2016, Johnson and Fernando Tatís Jr. were traded to the San Diego Padres in exchange for James Shields. After the trade, he was demoted to Triple–A but was called up to pitch in the Padres rotation a week later. Through his first four starts with the Padres, Johnson was 0–4 with an ERA of 9.15 while allowing more than four runs in each start. He was placed on the disabled list on July 1. On October 11, it was announced that Johnson would miss the entire 2017 season after undergoing Tommy John surgery. On December 16, Johnson signed a new minor league contract with the Padres.

Johnson missed the entire 2017 season as a result of the procedure. He elected free agency following the season on November 6, 2017.

On March 6, 2018, Johnson re–signed with San Diego on a minor league contract. He split the year between the Double–A San Antonio Missions and Triple–A El Paso Chihuahuas, making 26 combined appearances and accumulating a 3.98 ERA with 45 strikeouts across 40 2/3 innings pitched. Johnson elected free agency following the season on November 2.
