= Charlie Leesman =

American baseball player (born 1987)

Charles Leesman
- Pitcher
- Born: March 10, 1987 (age 39); Cincinnati, Ohio, U.S.
- Batted: Left Threw: Left

MLB debut
- August 9, 2013, for the Chicago White Sox

Last MLB appearance
- April 22, 2014, for the Chicago White Sox

MLB statistics
- Win–loss record: 0–1
- Earned run average: 9.00
- Strikeouts: 13
- Stats at Baseball Reference

Teams
- Chicago White Sox (2013–2014)

Charles James Leesman (born March 10, 1987) is an American former professional baseball pitcher. He also played in Major League Baseball (MLB) for the Chicago White Sox. He made his major league debut on August 9, 2013. Before his professional career, Leesman attended Xavier University, where he played college baseball for the Xavier Musketeers.

Before attending Xavier University, Leesman led the Elder High School Panthers to a 28–1 record and the 2005 Division I state title.

== Minors ==
Leesman was drafted by the Minnesota Twins in the 40th round of the 2005 MLB draft, but did not sign, opting to attend Xavier University, where he played for the Xavier Musketeers baseball team. Leesman was then drafted by the Chicago White Sox in the 11th round of the 2008 MLB draft, and signed. Leesman then started his professional baseball career with the White Sox rookie league Bristol White Sox.

In 2009, Leesman spent the entire season with the Class A Kannapolis Intimidators and finishing the season with a record of 13-5, 3.08 ERA and 117 strikeouts in 157+ innings. In 2010, Leesman started the season with Class A-Advanced Winston-Salem before getting promoted to Double-A Birmingham. He finished the 2010 season combined with a 14-6 record, 4.07 ERA and 90 strikeouts in 148+ innings. Before the 2011 season, the White Sox added Leesman to their 40-man roster to protect him from the Rule 5 draft after the season. Leesman spent the 2012 season with the Triple-A Charlotte Knights and finished with a 12-10 record, 2.47 ERA and 103 strikeouts in 135 innings. Leesman injured his ACL during International League playoffs.

Leesman was designated for assignment by the White Sox on April 14, 2013, and claimed off waivers by the Rangers. The Rangers outrighted Leesman to the minor leagues, but he declined the assignment, becoming a free agent. Leesman then signed back with the White Sox on April 23, 2013.

== Career ==
=== Chicago White Sox ===
On July 9, 2013, Leesman's contract was purchased from Charlotte and placed on the White Sox roster as the 26th player due to the doubleheader exemption. On August 9, 2013, Leesman made his Major League debut in the second game of a doubleheader against the Minnesota Twins. He was designated for assignment on August 16, 2014 and released on August 20.

=== Pittsburgh Pirates ===
On January 9, 2015, he signed a minor league contract with the Pittsburgh Pirates.

=== Wichita Wingnuts ===
On March 31, 2016, Leesman signed with the Wichita Wingnuts of the American Association of Independent Professional Baseball. He was released on October 20, 2017.
