= Miguel González (catcher) =

Venezuelan baseball player (born 1990)

- Catcher
- Born: December 3, 1990 (age 35); Porlamar, Nueva Esparta, Venezuela
- Batted: Right Threw: Right

MLB debut
- September 10, 2013, for the Chicago White Sox

Last MLB appearance
- September 28, 2013, for the Chicago White Sox

MLB statistics
- Batting average: .222
- Home runs: 0
- Runs batted in: 0
- Stats at Baseball Reference

Teams
- As player: Chicago White Sox (2013); As coach: Chicago White Sox (2020–2025)

Miguel Antonio González (born December 3, 1990) is a Venezuelan former professional baseball catcher who formerly served as a bullpen catcher for the Chicago White Sox of Major League Baseball (MLB). He played in MLB for the White Sox.

== Playing career ==
=== Chicago White Sox ===
On June 16, 2008, González signed with the Chicago White Sox organization as an international free agent. He made his professional debut with that season with the Dominican Summer League White Sox, hitting .294 in 45 games. In 2009, González spent the year with the rookie–level Bristol White Sox, also appearing in three games for the Triple–A Charlotte Knights. In 45 contests for Bristol, he batted .311/.385/.503 with four home runs and 19 RBI.

In 2010 and 2011, González played for the Single–A Kannapolis Intimidators, hitting .218 with two home runs and 19 RBI in 92 games, and .255 with two home runs and 21 RBI in 55 games, respectively. He split the 2012 season between the High–A Winston-Salem Dash and Double–A Birmingham Barons. In 72 total games, he accumulated a combined .237/.301/.293 slash line with one home run and 23 RBI. In 2013, González played in 53 games split between Birmingham and Charlotte, accumulating a .254/.326/.349 batting line with two home runs and 20 RBI.

On September 2, 2013, González was selected to the 40-man roster and promoted to the major leagues for the first time after Tyler Flowers suffered a shoulder injury. On September 11, González collected his first MLB hit against Cleveland Indians pitcher Josh Tomlin. He played in five games for the White Sox, going 2–for–9 (.222) with no home runs or RBI. On September 30, he was removed from the 40–man roster and sent outright to Triple–A.

In 2014, González spent the year split between Birmingham and Charlotte, hitting .253/.306/.384 with 2 home runs and 11 RBI in 43 total games for the two affiliates.

=== Detroit Tigers ===
On December 18, 2014, González signed a minor league contract with the Detroit Tigers organization. During the 2015 season, he split time between the Double-A Erie SeaWolves and Triple-A Toledo Mud Hens, appearing in 69 games and hitting .242 with 18 doubles, two home runs and 26 RBIs.

On December 11, 2015, González re–signed with Detroit on a new minor league deal, and was invited to spring training. In 2016, he played in 67 games for the Triple–A Toledo Mud Hens, hitting .243/.298/.327 with 2 home runs and 33 RBI.

In 2017, González played in 52 games (26 games each) for Triple–A Toledo and the Double–A Erie SeaWolves, hitting a cumulative .220/.279/.305 with 4 home runs and 12 RBI. He elected free agency following the season on November 6, 2017.

=== Winnipeg Goldeyes ===
On March 5, 2018, González signed with the Winnipeg Goldeyes of the American Association of Professional Baseball.

== Coaching career ==
For the 2020 season, González was hired by the White Sox as a bullpen catcher.. In 2026, he was named as a development coach for the ACL White Sox the rookie-affiliate of the Chicago White Sox.

== See also ==
- List of Major League Baseball players from Venezuela
