= Blake Tekotte =

American baseball player (born 1987)

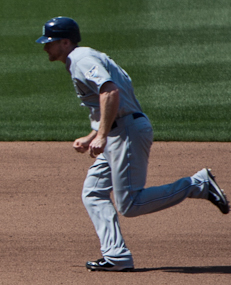
- Tekotte with the San Diego Padres in 2011
- Outfielder
- Born: May 24, 1987 (age 39); Columbia, Missouri, U.S.
- Batted: Left Threw: Right

MLB debut
- May 25, 2011, for the San Diego Padres

Last MLB appearance
- August 11, 2013, for the Chicago White Sox

MLB statistics
- Batting average: .188
- Home runs: 1
- Runs batted in: 3
- Stats at Baseball Reference

Teams
- San Diego Padres (2011–2012); Chicago White Sox (2013)

Blake Aaron Tekotte (born May 24, 1987) is a former American professional baseball outfielder. He played in Major League Baseball (MLB) for the San Diego Padres and Chicago White Sox.

== Playing career ==
=== Amateur ===
Tekotte attended David H. Hickman High School in Columbia, Missouri and the University of Miami, where he played for the Miami Hurricanes baseball team. While at Miami, he reached the College World Series in 2006 and 2008. In 2007, he played collegiate summer baseball with the Brewster Whitecaps of the Cape Cod Baseball League and was named a league all-star.

=== San Diego Padres ===
Tekotte was drafted by San Diego Padres in the third round, with the 101st overall selection, of the 2008 Major League Baseball draft.

On May 23, 2011, Tekotte was promoted to the major leagues for the first time. Tekotte made his major league debut on May 25, one day after his 24th birthday, pinch-hitting for Mat Latos, and lining out to the right fielder Jon Jay.

Tekotte made 11 appearances for San Diego in 2012, going 2-for-15 (.133) with one stolen base. On November 2, 2012, Tekotte was designated for assignment by the Padres.

=== Chicago White Sox ===
On November 7, 2012, Tekotte was traded to the Chicago White Sox in exchange for Brandon Kloess. On August 9, 2013, Tekotte hit his first Major League home run against Minnesota Twins pitcher Liam Hendriks. In 20 appearances for the White Sox, he slashed .226/.306/.355 with one home run, two RBI, and one stolen bases. On December 6, Tekotte was removed from the 40-man roster and sent outright to the Triple-A Charlotte Knights.

Tekotte began the 2014 season with Charlotte, playing in 81 games and hitting .251/.324/.438 with 11 home runs and 35 RBI.

=== Arizona Diamondbacks ===
On August 3, 2014, Tekotte was traded to the Arizona Diamondbacks in exchange for cash considerations. In 7 games for the Triple-A Reno Aces, he went 4-for-18 (.222) with 6 RBI. Tekotte was released by the Diamondbacks organization on August 16.

=== Boston Red Sox ===
Tekotte signed a minor league contract with the Boston Red Sox on January 10, 2015. In 49 games for the Double-A Portland Sea Dogs, he batted .275/.364/.425 with three home runs, 20 RBI, and four stolen bases. Tekotte elected free agency following the season on November 6.

=== Long Island Ducks ===
Tekotte signed with the Long Island Ducks of the Atlantic League of Professional Baseball on March 21, 2016.

== Coaching career ==
Tekotte retired following the 2016 season, and returned to complete his degree at the University of Miami. He has joined the Miami Hurricanes baseball coaching staff for the 2017 season as a student coach.

== Personal life ==
In February 2024, Tekotte was charged with assault and kidnapping in Columbia, Missouri. He was convicted of assault and kidnapping in July of 2025.
