= Brandon Jacobs (baseball) =

American baseball player (born 1990)

- Outfielder
- Born: December 8, 1990 (age 35); Snellville, Georgia, U.S.
- Bats: Right Throws: Right
- Stats at Baseball Reference

Brandon Foster Jacobs (born December 8, 1990) is an American former professional baseball outfielder.

== Career ==
=== Boston Red Sox ===
The Boston Red Sox drafted Jacobs in the tenth round of the 2009 Major League Baseball draft. Kevin Goldstein of Baseball Prospectus ranked Jacobs as the 46th best prospect in baseball prior to the 2012 season.

=== Chicago White Sox ===
On July 12, 2013, Jacobs was traded to the Chicago White Sox in exchange for pitcher Matt Thornton and cash. He was ranked the #7 ranked prospect in the White Sox organization. After the trade, Jacobs played for Double-A Birmingham Barons. He finished the 2013 season combined hitting .244 in 455 at bats, 33 doubles, 13 home runs, 66 runs batted in, 44 walks, 140 strikeouts, and 12 stolen bases.

=== Arizona Diamondbacks ===
On December 10, 2013, Jacobs was traded to the Arizona Diamondbacks alongside Mark Trumbo and A. J. Schugel as part of a three-team trade that saw the Los Angeles Angels acquire Hector Santiago and the White Sox acquire Adam Eaton.

=== Traverse City Beach Bums ===
On January 10, 2015, Jacobs signed a minor league contract with the Kansas City Royals, but he was released during spring training. On April 10, he signed with the Traverse City Beach Bums of the independent Frontier League.
