= Dylan Axelrod =

American baseball player (born 1985)

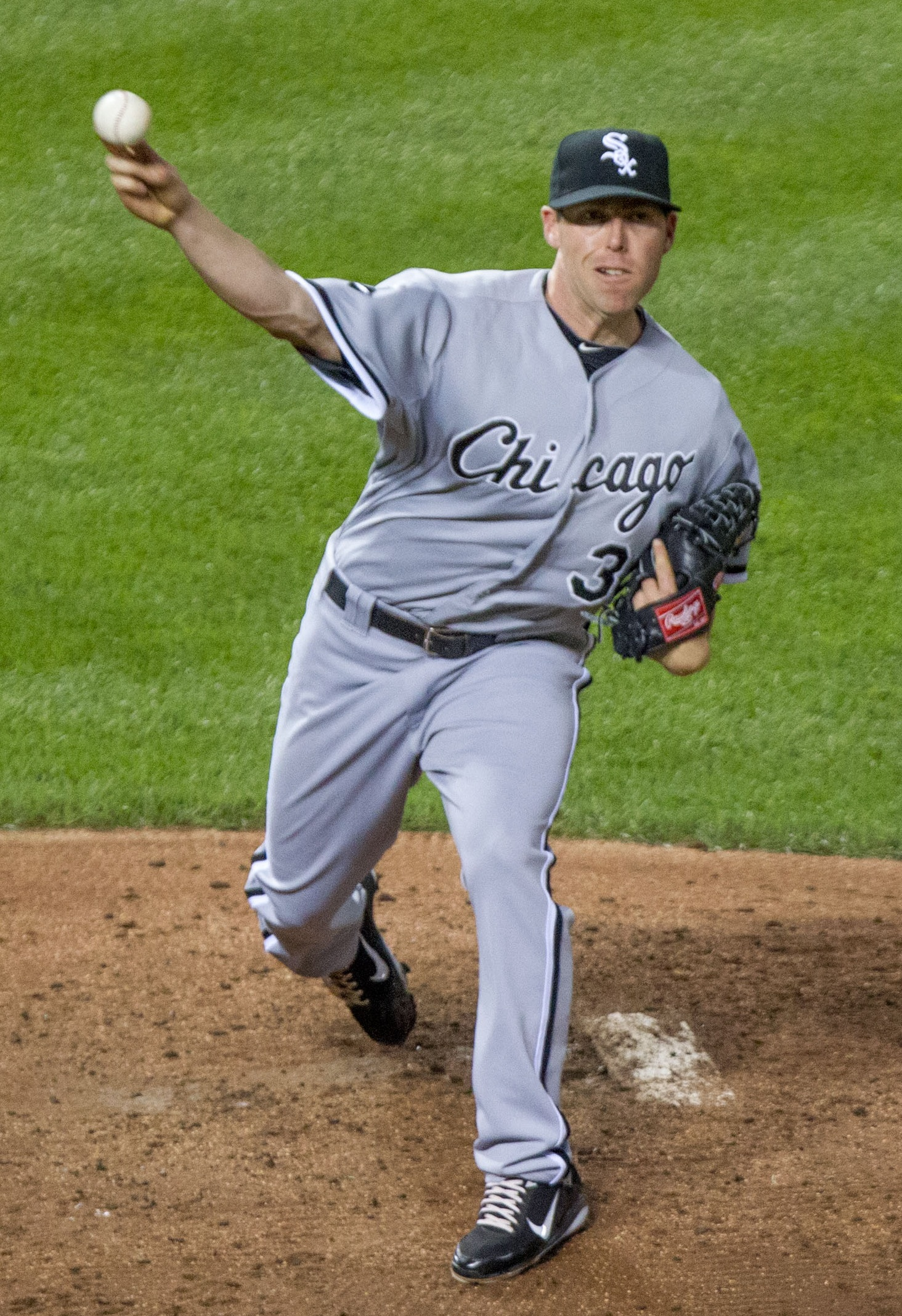
- Axelrod with the Chicago White Sox
- Pitcher
- Born: July 30, 1985 (age 40); Santa Barbara, California, U.S.
- Batted: Right Threw: Right

MLB debut
- September 7, 2011, for the Chicago White Sox

Last MLB appearance
- August 18, 2015, for the Cincinnati Reds

MLB statistics
- Win–loss record: 9–15
- Earned run average: 5.27
- Strikeouts: 164
- Stats at Baseball Reference

Teams
- Chicago White Sox (2011–2013); Cincinnati Reds (2014–2015)

Dylan Davis Haines Axelrod (born July 30, 1985) is an American pitching performance and integration coordinator for the Detroit Tigers. He is also a former professional baseball pitcher, as well as a former pitcher for Team Israel. He played in Major League Baseball (MLB) for the Chicago White Sox and the Cincinnati Reds.

At Santa Barbara High School, Axelrod was one of the 2003 Channel League Most Valuable Players, and First Team All-County. After college, he was drafted in the 30th round of the 2007 MLB draft by the San Diego Padres. In 2009, he was a Frontier League All Star. In 2011, he was named a Double–A Southern League All-Star and an MiLB.com 2011 Cincinnati Reds Organization All Star. He pitched in the major leagues for the Chicago White Sox (2011–13) and the Cincinnati Reds (2014–15).

== Early life ==
Axelrod was born in Santa Barbara, California, to Dennis and Joni Axelrod. After his mother discovered she had cancer, she home-schooled him for four years. She died on his 10th birthday, in 1995. His grandmother Lula Axelrod kept score at his games from PONY League through college, until she died at the age of 90. His paternal grandfather Sol Axelrod died before he was born. He has a brother, named Aaron.

=== High school and college ===
He had a 13–1 record as a pitcher his senior year at Santa Barbara High School, where Axelrod was named one of the team's Most Valuable Players (MVP). He was one of the 2003 Channel League MVP's, and First Team All-County. He was undrafted out of high school. The Santa Barbara Athletic Round Table held inducted Axelrod into its Hall of Fame in 2018.

Axelrod went on to Santa Barbara City College (SBCC). He played college baseball there in 2004 and 2005, had a school-record 117 strikeouts in 2004, and was named Outstanding Pitcher.

After two years at SBCC, Axelrod transferred to University of California, Irvine (UC Irvine), where he played for the Anteaters from 2006 to 2007. He was a reliever with UC Irvine, and was seventh in the Big West Conference in appearances in 2006 with 28 and had a 3–3 record with a 4.59 ERA.

He played for the Santa Barbara Foresters in the California Collegiate League (CCL) during the summer of 2006, and the team won the National Baseball Congress World Series title as he went 5–0 with a 2.01 ERA. He recorded 34 appearances (leading the league) in 2007, and went 6–4 with a 3.96 ERA, striking out 79 in 72.2 innings. In February 2014 he was inducted into the Foresters Hall of Fame.

== Playing career ==
=== San Diego Padres ===
==== Minor leagues ====
Axelrod was drafted in the 30th round, 927th overall, of the 2007 MLB draft by the San Diego Padres.

Axelrod debuted in 2007 with the Arizona League Padres of the Rookie Arizona League, going 0–2 with 2 saves in 11 games exclusively as a reliever with a 5.40 ERA, before earning a promotion to the Fort Wayne Wizards of the Single–A Midwest League, where in 10 games out of the pen he had a 1.27 ERA. He started 2008 with the Lake Elsinore Storm of the High–A California League, going 2–1 as a reliever in 32 games with a 5.29 ERA, before being sent back to Fort Wayne, where he finished the year going 1–1 with a 3.95 ERA.

He started 2009 with Lake Elsinore, but after 11 games with a 4.50 ERA Axelrod was cut.

=== Chicago White Sox ===
He signed with the Windy City ThunderBolts of the Independent Frontier League, where, after he had a 2.21 ERA in 22 games with 6 saves, and being a Frontier League All-Star, he drew the attention of the Chicago White Sox, signing a deal on August 2, 2009. When he made it to the major leagues, he became the second Thunderbolt to do so. He pitched for the Kannapolis Intimidators of the Single–A South Atlantic League where, after 2 games, he was promoted to the Winston-Salem Dash of the High–A Carolina League, where he started 5 games and had a 1.91 ERA.

Axelrod started 2010 with Winston-Salem, going 8–3 with a 1.99 ERA in 99 1/3 innings, and pitched two games for the Birmingham Barons of the Double–A Southern League. He started 2011 with Birmingham as their opening day starter, going 3–2 with a 3.34 ERA and was a Southern League All-Star, before being promoted to the Charlotte Knights of the Triple–A International League, by then a full-time starter, going 6–1 with a 2.27 ERA in 15 starts before being promoted again to the major leagues. Baseball America rated him as having the Best Control in the Chicago White Sox system after the 2010 season. At the time of his promotion to the major leagues in 2011, he led all White Sox minor leaguers in ERA (2.69), strikeouts (132), and opponents' batting average (.227), and was 9–3. He was named an MiLB.com 2011 Cincinnati Reds Organization All Star.

==== Major leagues ====
On September 5, 2011, Axelrod was promoted to the major leagues for the first time. Tony Peña was transferred to the 60-day DL to make room on the 40-man roster. He made his MLB debut on September 7, pitching 2 scoreless innings in relief of starter John Danks in a game the White Sox lost, 5–4, to the Minnesota Twins. Axelrod made his first Major League start a week later, on September 14 vs. the first-place Detroit Tigers, who were on an 11-game win streak. He exited after six innings with a 5–2 lead, after striking out eight Tigers. Unfortunately for Axelrod, the White Sox bullpen blew the lead in the 9th inning and he did not pick up the win. It was announced prior to his start that Axelrod would assume Jake Peavy's place in the White Sox rotation for the remainder of the 2011 season.

Axelrod started two more games in the 2011 season: September 20 against Cleveland, pitching 4 2/3 innings and allowing seven hits and four runs; but was back on form September 26 against the Toronto Blue Jays, pitching six shutout innings, allowing three hits while striking out six, and recording his first Major League win. For the season, he was 1-0 for the White Sox with a 2.89 ERA.

In 2012 Axelrod made 16 starts for Charlotte, going 7–5 with a 2.88 ERA. Axelrod was 2–2 with a 5.17 ERA for the White Sox in 2012, and struggled in 2013, with a 4–11 record and 5.68 ERA for the White Sox. Among pitchers who threw as many innings or more as Axelrod (128 1/3) in 2013, only four had worse ERAs. After the 2013 season, Axelrod was non-tendered by the White Sox, making him a free agent. He was re-signed to a minor league deal on January 9, 2014.

=== Cincinnati Reds ===
The White Sox traded Axelrod to the Cincinnati Reds for cash considerations on July 17, 2014. He was 2-1 for the Reds in 2014, with a 2.95 ERA, striking out 9.82 batters per nine innings and walking 1.96 batters per nine innings. In 2014, he pitched for both Charlotte and the Louisville Bats, both of the International League, going a combined 8–9 with a 4.01 ERA. He was named International League Pitcher of the Week on August 11, 2014. During the summer he pitched for the Toros del Este of the Dominican Winter League, going 3–1 with a 3.23 ERA in 7 starts. In 2015, he pitched in half a dozen games for the Reds. In 2015, Axelrod pitched again for Louisville, going 6–8 with a 4.68 ERA.

=== Miami Marlins ===
On December 11, 2015, Axelrod signed a minor league contract with the Miami Marlins organization. Pitching for the Triple–A New Orleans Zephyrs, he was 9–7 with a 4.19 ERA in 25 starts (7th in the league), with a complete game (6th). Axelrod elected free agency following the season on November 7, 2016.

=== World Baseball Classic; Team Israel ===
Axelrod pitched for Team Israel at the 2017 World Baseball Classic, in March 2017. At the opening tune of the Israeli national anthem “Hatikvah,” each Team Israel pulled out a blue yarmulke. Axelrod later donated his yarmulke to the Baseball Hall of Fame.

== Coaching career ==
=== Los Angeles Angels ===
In January 2020, Axelrod joined the Los Angeles Angels as a pitching coordinator. Following the 2023 season, Axelrod was let go by the Angels organization following Troy Percival's criticism of the use of iPads in player development.

=== Detroit Tigers ===
On December 28, 2023, Axelrod was hired by the Detroit Tigers to serve as the team's pitching performance and integration coordinator.

== Scouting report ==
Axelrod's broad repertoire consisted of a four-seam fastball (86–90 mph), a sinker (86–90 mph), a cutter (85–88 mph), a slider (80–83 mph), a curveball (72–76 mph), and a changeup (80–85 mph). The cutter was his least commonly used pitch.
