= Donnie Veal =

American baseball player (born 1984)

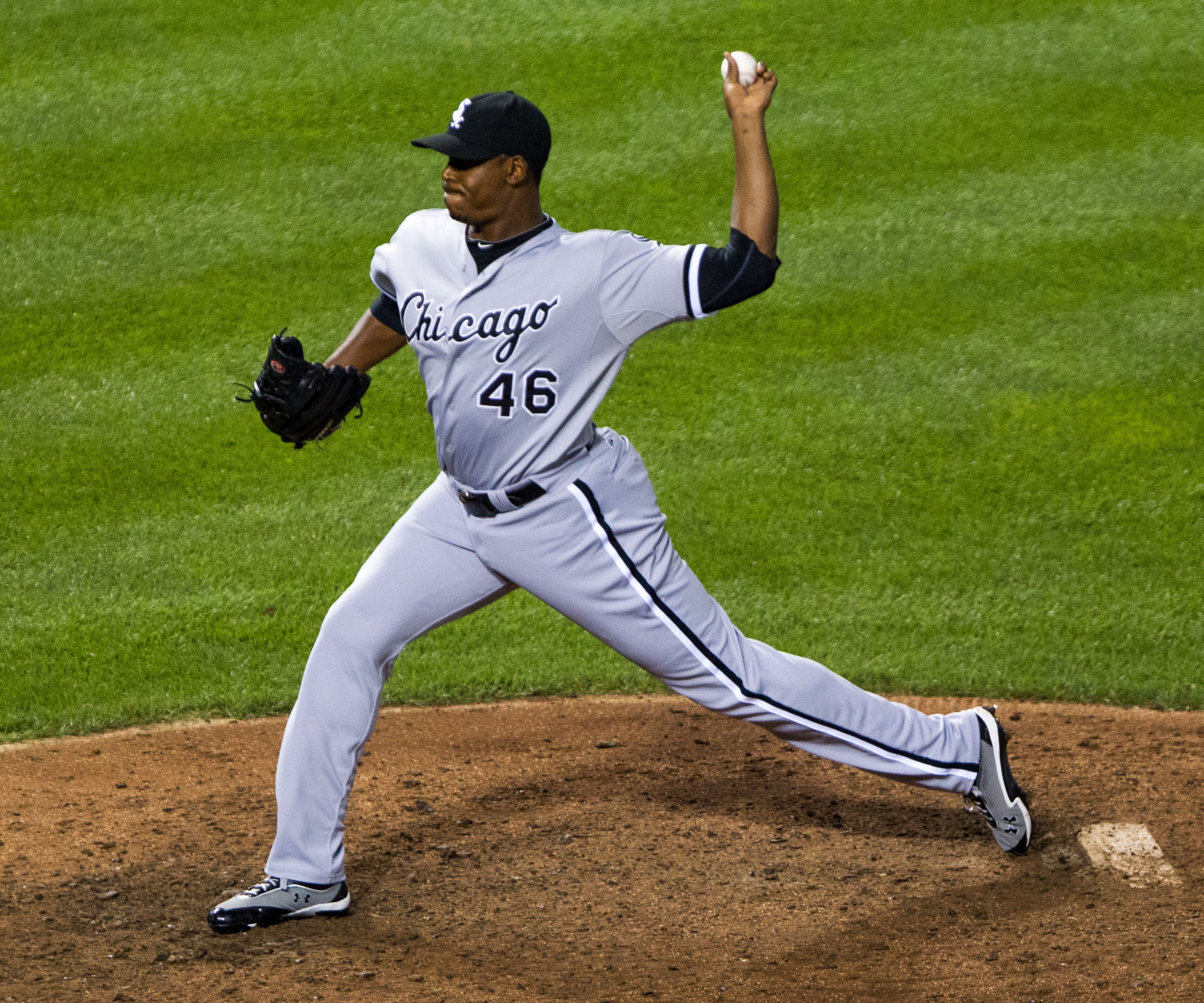
- Veal with the Chicago White Sox
- Pitcher
- Born: September 18, 1984 (age 41); Jackson, Mississippi, U.S.
- Batted: Left Threw: Left

MLB debut
- April 7, 2009, for the Pittsburgh Pirates

Last MLB appearance
- May 31, 2015, for the Atlanta Braves

MLB statistics
- Win–loss record: 3–3
- Earned run average: 5.48
- Strikeouts: 73
- Stats at Baseball Reference

Teams
- Pittsburgh Pirates (2009); Chicago White Sox (2012–2014); Atlanta Braves (2015)

Donald Tyrone Veal (born September 18, 1984) is an American former professional baseball pitcher. Veal played in Major League Baseball (MLB) for the Pittsburgh Pirates, Chicago White Sox, and Atlanta Braves. He was drafted by the Chicago Cubs in the 2nd round of the 2005 Major League Baseball draft and is currently a minor league pitching coach for the White Sox.

== Playing career ==
=== Chicago Cubs ===
Veal was drafted by the Chicago Cubs in the second round, 68th overall, of the 2005 Major League Baseball draft out of Pima Community College in Tucson, Arizona. Veal had previously pitched in the Pac-10 for the University of Arizona, before transferring. Veal made his professional debut with the rookie-level AZL Cubs, and also played for the Low-A Boise Hawks, posting a 1-3 record and 3.18 ERA in 11 games between the two teams. Veal split the 2006 season between the Single-A Peoria Chiefs and the High-A Daytona Cubs, accumulating an 11-5 record and 2.16 ERA with 174 strikeouts in 154.1 innings of work. Veal spent the 2007 season with the Double-A Tennessee Smokies, registering an 8-10 record and 4.97 ERA in 28 appearances. Veal returned to Tennessee the following season and pitched to a 5-10 record and 4.52 ERA with 123 strikeouts in 145.1 innings pitched.

=== Pittsburgh Pirates ===
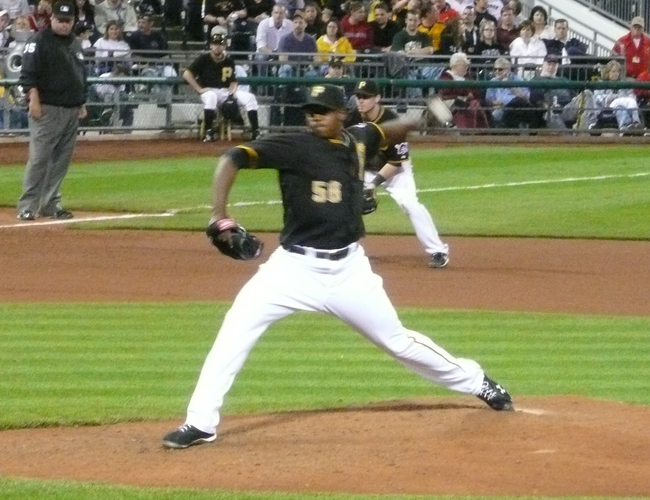
Veal pitching for the Pirates in 2009

On December 11, 2008, Veal was left unprotected by the Cubs, and was selected by the Pittsburgh Pirates in the 2008 Rule 5 draft. Veal made his MLB debut on April 7, 2009, pitching one inning and allowing one run while striking out the side. He spent the 2009 season on the Pirates' major league roster gaining experience in the bullpen, largely in a late-inning mop-up role, recording a 7.16 ERA in 19 appearances in his rookie year. Veal took part in the 2009 Arizona Fall League as a starting pitcher for the Scottsdale Scorpions.

Veal began the 2010 season with the Triple-A Indianapolis Indians, but was sidelined with an arm injury in late May. It was further diagnosed that he would require Tommy John surgery and missed the remainder of the season. On December 2, 2010, Veal was non-tendered by the Pirates and became a free agent. On December 10, Veal re-signed with Pittsburgh on a minor league contract. He was assigned to the High-A Bradenton Marauders as he began his rehab from Tommy John. Veal split the 2011 season between the GCL Pirates, Bradenton, the Double-A Altoona Curve, and Indianapolis, logging a 4.22 ERA in 19 games between the four teams. On November 2, 2011, Veal elected free agency.

=== Chicago White Sox ===
On November 10, 2011, Veal signed a major league contract with the Chicago White Sox. He was assigned to the Triple-A Charlotte Knights to begin the season. Veal was recalled to the big leagues on July 19, 2012. Veal made 24 appearances out of the bullpen for Chicago in 2012, posting a 1.38 ERA in 13.0 innings of work. In 2013, Veal pitched in 50 games for the White Sox, logging a 4.60 ERA with 29 strikeouts in 29.1 innings pitched. The following year, Veal struggled to a 7.50 ERA in 7 games for the Chicago before he was designated for assignment on April 17, 2014. He was sent outright to Charlotte, where he finished the year. In 37 Triple-A appearances, Veal recorded a 4-5 record and 5.94 ERA with 49 strikeouts in 50.0 innings of work. On November 3, he elected free agency.

=== Atlanta Braves ===
On November 10, 2014, Veal signed a minor league contract with the Atlanta Braves organization. He was assigned to the Triple-A Gwinnett Braves to begin the season. Veal was selected to the major leagues on April 30, 2015. Veal was designated for assignment by Atlanta on May 5 after giving up 4 runs in 3.1 innings of work.

Veal was re-selected to the active roster on May 27. He was again designated for assignment on June 1 after struggling to a 14.54 ERA across 5 appearances. Veal was released by the Braves on June 8.

=== Long Island Ducks ===
On July 10, 2015, Veal signed with the Long Island Ducks of the independent Atlantic League of Professional Baseball. In 20 appearances with the Ducks, Veal pitched to a 1.45 ERA with 26 strikeouts across 18 2/3 innings pitched. He became a free agent after the year.

=== Texas Rangers ===
On December 30, 2015, Veal signed a minor league contract with the Texas Rangers organization. Veal allowed two runs in an inning of work in spring training and was released by the Rangers on April 6, 2016.

== Coaching career ==
On February 3, 2021, Veal was named the rehab pitching coach of the Chicago White Sox for the 2021 season. In 2022 and 2023, he was pitching coach for the Triple-A Charlotte Knights. Prior to the 2024 season, Veal transferred to the role of assistant pitching coordinator.

== Pitching style ==
Veal throws mainly two pitches—a four-seam fastball at 91–94 mph, used to set up a curveball at 77–79 mph. He also throws a small amount of changeups to right-handed hitters, as well has a handful of two-seam fastballs. As of September 10, 2012, Veal's excellent curve has resulted in most of his strikeouts carries a whiff rate of 49%, as well as a ground ball/fly ball ratio of 7:1.

== See also ==
- Rule 5 draft results
