= Jesse Crain =

Canadian baseball player (born 1981)

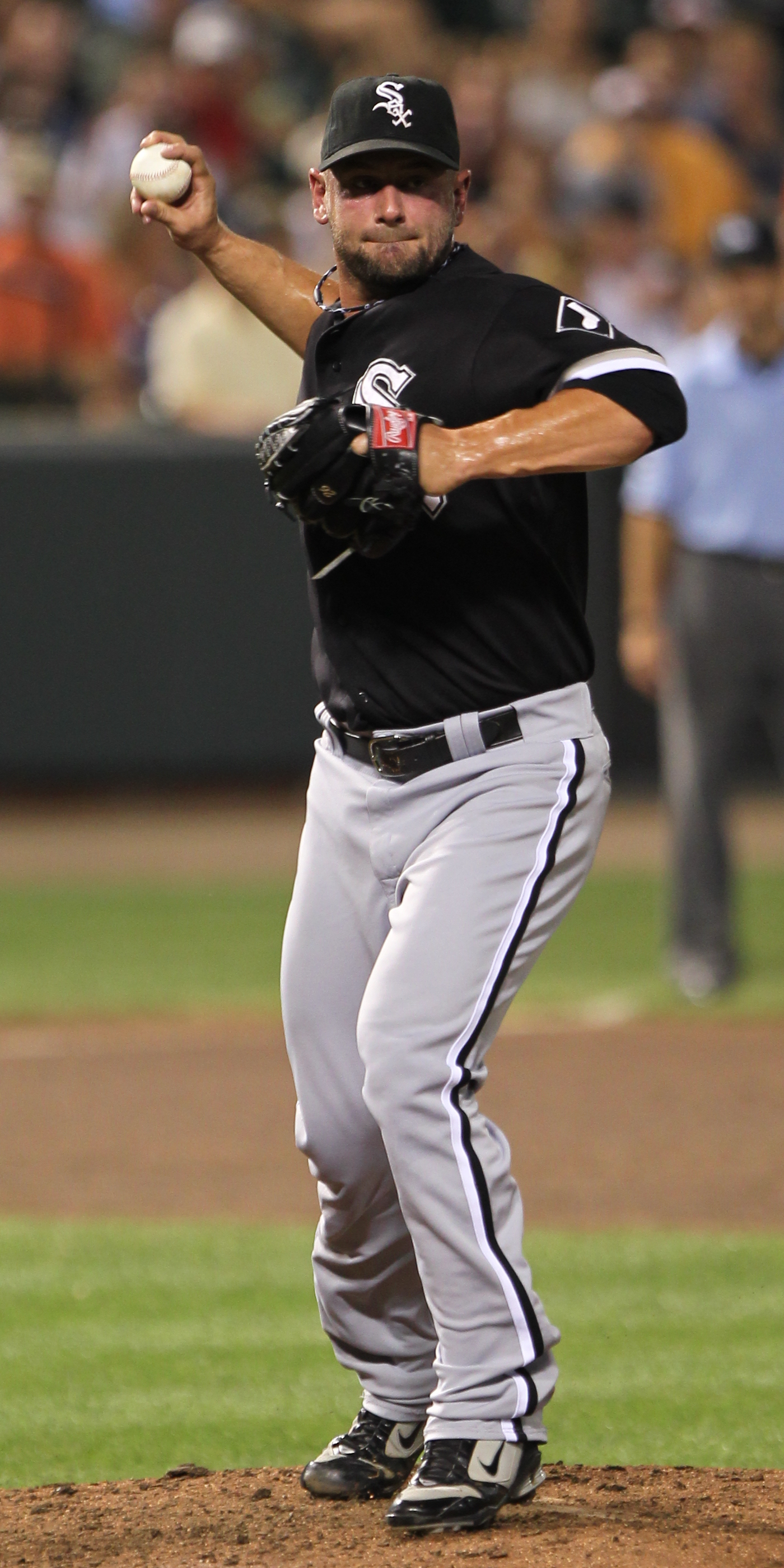
- Crain with the Chicago White Sox

Glacier Range Riders
- Pitcher / Coach
- Born: July 5, 1981 (age 44); Toronto, Ontario, Canada
- Batted: Right Threw: Right

MLB debut
- August 5, 2004, for the Minnesota Twins

Last MLB appearance
- June 29, 2013, for the Chicago White Sox

MLB statistics
- Win–loss record: 45–30
- Earned run average: 3.05
- Strikeouts: 440
- Stats at Baseball Reference

Teams
- Minnesota Twins (2004–2010); Chicago White Sox (2011–2013)

Career highlights and awards
- All-Star (2013)

Jesse Alan Crain (born July 5, 1981) is a Canadian former professional baseball pitcher. He played in Major League Baseball (MLB) for the Minnesota Twins and Chicago White Sox.

== High school and college ==
Crain was born in Toronto, Ontario and attended Fairview High School in Boulder, Colorado, where he played baseball, basketball, and football. He was named 1999 All-State and Colorado High School Player of the Year. He was a 2001 graduate of San Jacinto Junior College in Texas, where he was an All-Conference shortstop. In 2002, he transferred to the University of Houston and was named to the all-conference team as a shortstop and relief pitcher, the all-conference tournament team as a shortstop, and the conference all-academic team. He was named first team All-America by Baseball America and Baseball Weekly and second team All-America by the ABCA.

== Minor leagues ==
Crain was drafted by the Minnesota Twins in the second round (61st overall) of the 2002 Major League Baseball draft. He made his professional debut that year with the Rookie-level Elizabethton Twins, going 2–1 with two saves and an ERA of 0.57 in nine relief appearances. Crain was later promoted to the Single-A Quad Cities River Bandits, where he went 1–1 with one save and a 1.50 ERA in nine relief appearances. In 18 combined appearances, he went 3–2 with three saves and an 0.98 ERA. In 2003, he managed to pitch at all three levels in the minor leagues, going 6–3 with 19 saves and a 1.93 ERA in 55 relief appearances. In 2004, Crain pitched with the Triple-A Rochester Red Wings and went 3–2 with 19 saves and a 2.49 ERA in 41 relief appearances before being called up by the Twins.

== Major leagues ==
=== Minnesota Twins ===
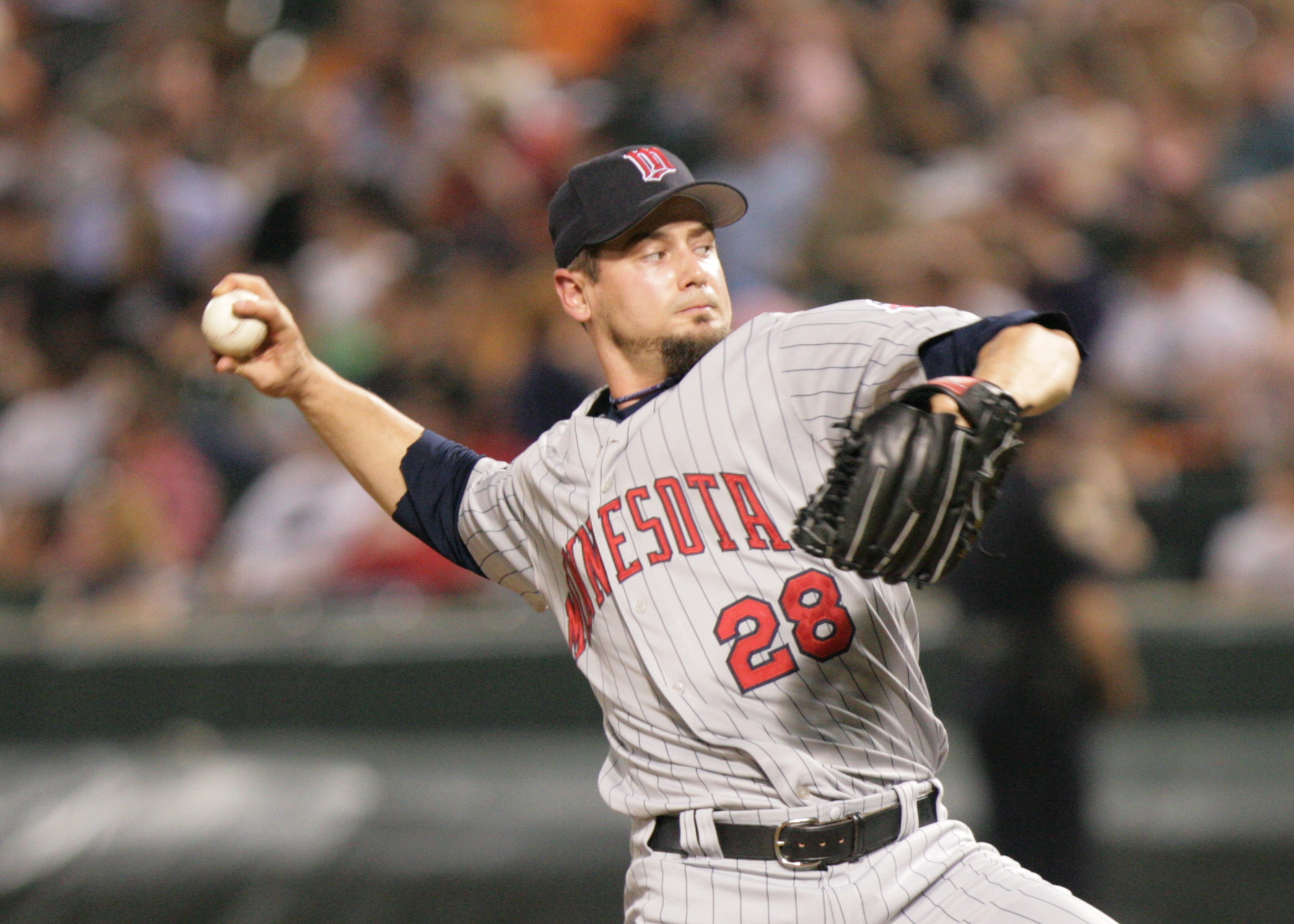
Crain pitching for the Twins in 2006.

Crain was called up by the Twins on August 1, 2004. He spent the remainder of the season in the majors, going 3–0 with a 2.00 ERA in 22 relief appearances. In 2005, Crain made the major league roster out of spring training. Starting the season 8–0, he set a record for most consecutive wins in relief to start a career.

On May 17, 2007, Crain was placed on the 15-day disabled list with a torn rotator cuff and labrum. He missed the rest of the season after undergoing surgery.

Crain returned to the team in 2008. He stepped up, along with Craig Breslow, to fill the eighth-inning setup role formerly occupied by Pat Neshek, who was placed on the 60-day disabled list on May 9 with an acute tear of the ulnar collateral ligament in his throwing arm. Crain went 5–4 with a 3.59 ERA in 66 games.

On April 20, 2009, Crain was placed on the disabled list with a sore right shoulder. He was activated on May 3. In 56 relief appearances, Crain went 7–4 with a 4.70 ERA. He fared better in 2010, going 1–1 with one save and a 3.04 ERA in 71 relief appearances.

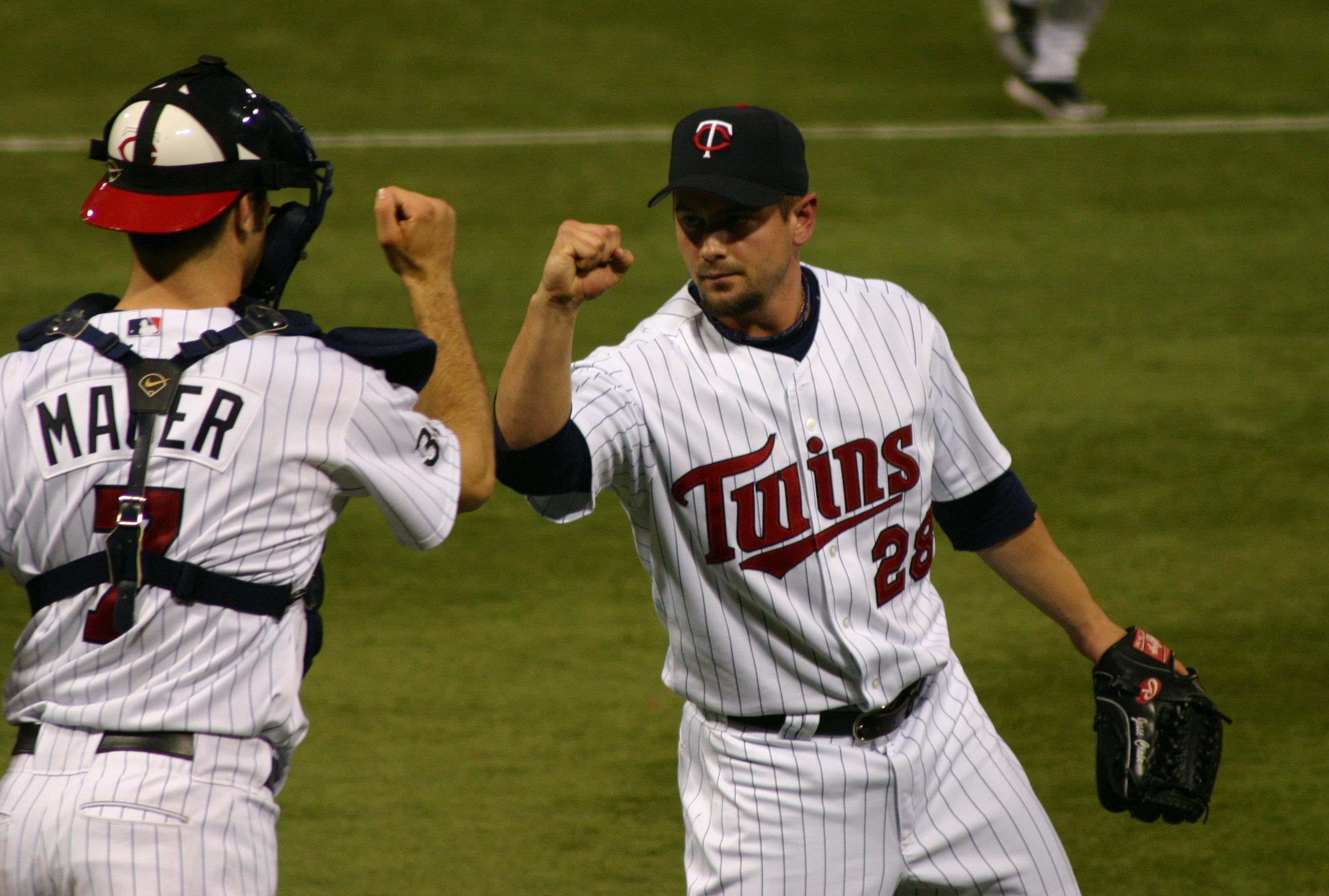
Jesse Crain celebrates a 2006 Twins win with Joe Mauer

=== Chicago White Sox ===
On December 20, 2010, Crain signed a three-year, $13 million contract with the Chicago White Sox.

Crain was used as the setup man for 2013. From April 17 to June 22, Crain pitched 29 straight scoreless appearances, a franchise record. On July 3, Crain was placed on the disabled list with a right shoulder strain. In 38 games with Chicago, Crain went 2–3 with 19 holds and a 0.74 ERA, striking out 46 in 36.2 innings. Crain was elected to the All-Star Game, but since he was injured, he was replaced by Justin Masterson.

=== Tampa Bay Rays ===
Crain was traded to the Tampa Bay Rays on July 29, 2013, for future considerations. Crain was activated off the disabled list on September 23, but he did not appear in the regular or post season. On October 16, the compensation for the White Sox in the trade was named as minor-leaguers Sean Bierman and Ben Kline.

=== Houston Astros ===
On December 31, 2013, Crain agreed to terms on a one-year contract with the Houston Astros. He was placed on the 60-day DL on March 21 while recovering from offseason surgery on his right biceps. He did not play a single game for the Astros. He became a free agent following the season.

=== Chicago White Sox (second stint) ===
On January 22, 2015, Crain signed a minor league contract with the Chicago White Sox. He elected free agency after the season on November 6.

== World Baseball Classic ==
Crain was selected to represent Canada at the World Baseball Classic. In the first game of the 2006 edition of the Classic, Crain came into the game in the 9th inning. He got the save as Canada beat the South Africans 11–8.

In the 2009 World Baseball Classic, Crain struck out all four batters he faced in the eighth and ninth innings, although Canada ended up losing the game 6 - 2 to Italy.
