= 2013 Minnesota Twins season =

2013 Minnesota Twins
- League: American League
- Division: Central
- Ballpark: Target Field
- City: Minneapolis, Minnesota
- Record: 66–96 (.407)
- Divisional place: 4th
- Owners: Jim Pohlad
- General managers: Terry Ryan
- Managers: Ron Gardenhire
- Television: Fox Sports North (Dick Bremer, Bert Blyleven, Ron Coomer, Jamie Hersch)
- Radio: KTWN-FM (Cory Provus, Dan Gladden, Kris Atteberry, Alfonso Fernandez, Tony Oliva)
- Stats: ESPN.com; Baseball Reference

The 2013 Minnesota Twins season was the 53rd season for the franchise in Minnesota, and the 113th overall in the American League.

The Twins started the 2013 season on April 1, with a game against the Detroit Tigers (losing Opening Day 4–2). The Twins ended their season with a 5–1 loss against the Cleveland Indians.

The Twins finished their season with a 66–96 record, although they finished fourth in the American League Central standings ahead of the Chicago White Sox, avoiding a last place finish for the first time since 2010. The team continued to struggle with offense and bullpen rotation, despite the off-season acquisitions of veterans Vance Worley, Mike Pelfrey and Kevin Correia.

== Offseason transactions and spring training ==
- January 18, 2013: Agreed to terms with LHP Brian Duensing and C Drew Butera on one-year contracts.
- February 14, 2013: Agreed to terms with LHP Rafael Perez on a minor league contract.
- March 10, 2013: Reassigned RHP Bryan Augenstein, RHP Nick Blackburn, RHP Alex Meyer, RHP Lester Oliveros and RHP Esmerling Vásquez to their minor league camp.
- March 11, 2013: Optioned C Chris Herrmann to Rochester (IL) and RHP B.J. Hermsen, RHP Trevor May, RHP Michael Tonkin, C Josmil Pinto and INF Danny Santana to New Britain (EL).
- March 15, 2013: Optioned RHP Kyle Gibson and LHP Caleb Thielbar to Rochester (IL). Reassigned RHP Anthony Slama, C Kyle Knudson and INF James Beresford to their minor league camp.
- March 16, 2013: Optioned OF Oswaldo Arcia to Rochester (IL).
- March 17, 2013: Reassigned C Eric Fryer, INF Chris Colabello, INF Mark Sobolewski, OF Brian Dinkelman, OF Clete Thomas, RHP Deolis Guerra and RHP Shairon Martis to their minor league camp.
- March 23, 2013: Placed LHP Scott Diamond and RHP Anthony Swarzak on the 15-day DL.
- March 26, 2013: Reassigned RHP P. J. Walters and RHP Samuel Deduno to minor league camp.
- March 27, 2013: Optioned RHP Alex Burnett to Rochester (IL).
- March 30, 2013: Placed RHP Tim Wood on the 15-day DL, retroactive March 24. Reassigned RHP Rich Harden and LHP Rafael Perez to their minor league camp.
- March 31, 2013: Selected the contract of OF Wilkin Ramírez from Rochester (IL).

The Minnesota Twins finished in fifth place (.515) in the Grapefruit League during spring training with a 17–16 record overall (7–10 home / 10–6 away). They were 4.5 games behind the first place Baltimore Orioles.

== Season synopsis ==
- The Twins' batters ended the season with 1430 strikeouts, their most ever, and far exceeding the previous high of 1121 in 1997. Josh Willingham (128) led the club, with Brian Dozier (120) and Oswaldo Arcia (117) close behind.
- Joe Mauer started the All-Star game as the American League catcher. Reliever Glen Perkins was selected as a reserve but did not play.
- Mauer won his fifth Silver Slugger Award.

=== September ===
Finished 27 games behind the Detroit Tigers.

== Season standings ==
=== American League Central ===
AL Central
Team	W	L	Pct.	GB	Home	Road
Detroit Tigers	93	69	.574	—	51‍–‍30	42‍–‍39
Cleveland Indians	92	70	.568	1	51‍–‍30	41‍–‍40
Kansas City Royals	86	76	.531	7	44‍–‍37	42‍–‍39
Minnesota Twins	66	96	.407	27	32‍–‍49	34‍–‍47
Chicago White Sox	63	99	.389	30	37‍–‍44	26‍–‍55

=== American League Wild Card ===
Division winners
Team	W	L	Pct.
Boston Red Sox	97	65	.599
Oakland Athletics	96	66	.593
Detroit Tigers	93	69	.574

Wild Card teams (Top 2 teams qualify for postseason)
Team	W	L	Pct.	GB
Cleveland Indians	92	70	.568	+½
Tampa Bay Rays	92	71	.564	—
Texas Rangers	91	72	.558	1
Kansas City Royals	86	76	.531	5½
New York Yankees	85	77	.525	6½
Baltimore Orioles	85	77	.525	6½
Los Angeles Angels of Anaheim	78	84	.481	13½
Toronto Blue Jays	74	88	.457	17½
Seattle Mariners	71	91	.438	20½
Minnesota Twins	66	96	.407	25½
Chicago White Sox	63	99	.389	28½
Houston Astros	51	111	.315	40½

== Record vs. opponents ==
2013 American League record Source: MLB Standings Grid – 2013
Team	BAL	BOS	CWS	CLE	DET	HOU	KC	LAA	MIN	NYY	OAK	SEA	TB	TEX	TOR	NL
Baltimore	—	11–8	4–3	3–4	4–2	4–2	3–4	5–2	3–3	9–10	5–2	2–4	6–13	5–2	10–9	11–9
Boston	8–11	—	4–2	6–1	3–4	6–1	2–5	3–3	4–3	13–6	3–3	6–1	12–7	2–4	11–8	14–6
Chicago	3–4	2–4	—	2–17	7–12	3–4	9–10	3–4	8–11	3–3	2–5	3–3	2–5	4–2	4–3	8–12
Cleveland	4–3	1–6	17–2	—	4–15	6–1	10–9	4–2	13–6	1–6	5–2	5–2	2–4	5–1	4–2	11–9
Detroit	2–4	4–3	12–7	15–4	—	6–1	9–10	0–6	11–8	3–3	3–4	5–2	3–3	3–4	5–2	12–8
Houston	2–4	1–6	4–3	1–6	1–6	—	2–4	10–9	1–5	1–5	4–15	9–10	2–5	2–17	3–4	8–12
Kansas City	4–3	5–2	10–9	9–10	10–9	4–2	—	2–5	15–4	2–5	1–5	4–3	6–1	3–3	2–4	9–11
Los Angeles	2–5	3–3	4–3	2–4	6–0	9–10	5–2	—	1–5	3–4	8–11	11–8	4–3	4–15	6–1	10–10
Minnesota	3–3	3–4	11–8	6–13	8–11	5–1	4–15	5–1	—	2–5	1–6	4–3	1–6	4–3	1–5	8–12
New York	10–9	6–13	3–3	6–1	3–3	5–1	5–2	4–3	5–2	—	1–5	4–3	7–12	3–4	14–5	9–11
Oakland	2–5	3–3	5–2	2–5	4–3	15–4	5–1	11–8	6–1	5–1	—	8–11	3–3	10–9	4–3	13–7
Seattle	4–2	1–6	3–3	2–5	2–5	10–9	3–4	8–11	3–4	3–4	11–8	—	3–3	7–12	3–3	8–12
Tampa Bay	13–6	7–12	5–2	4–2	3–3	5–2	1–6	3–4	6–1	12–7	3–3	3–3	—	4–4	11–8	12–8
Texas	2–5	4–2	2–4	1–5	4–3	17–2	3–3	15–4	3–4	4–3	9–10	12–7	4–4	—	1–6	10–10
Toronto	9–10	8–11	3–4	2–4	2–5	4–3	4–2	1–6	5–1	5–14	3–4	3–3	8–11	6–1	—	11–9

== Detailed records ==
- updated to game played September 29, 2013

American League
Opponent	Home	Away	Total	Percentage
AL East
Baltimore Orioles	1–2	2–1	3–3	.500
Boston Red Sox	0–3	3–1	3–4	.429
New York Yankees	0–4	2–1	2–5	.286
Tampa Bay Rays	1–2	0–4	1–6	.143
Toronto Blue Jays	0–3	1–2	1–5	.167
AL EAST	2–14	8–9	10–23	.303
AL Central
Chicago White Sox	5–5	6–3	11–8	.579
Cleveland Indians	3–7	3–6	6–13	.316
Detroit Tigers	4–5	4–6	8–11	.421
Kansas City Royals	2–8	2–7	4–15	.211
AL CENTRAL	14–25	15–22	29–47	.382
AL West
Houston Astros	3–0	2–1	5–1	.833
Los Angeles Angels	3–0	2–1	5–1	.833
Oakland Athletics	1–2	0–4	1–6	.143
Seattle Mariners	2–1	2–2	4–3	.571
Texas Rangers	2–2	2–1	4–3	.571
AL WEST	11–5	8–9	19–14	.576
American League	27–44	31–40	58–84	.408

National League
Opponent	Home	Away	Total	Percentage
Atlanta Braves	–	0–3	0–3	.000
Miami Marlins	1–1	0–2	1–3	.250
Milwaukee Brewers	2–0	2–0	4–0	1.000
New York Mets	0–3	–	0–3	.000
Philadelphia Phillies	2–1	–	2–1	.667
Washington Nationals	–	1–2	1–2	.333
National League	5–5	3–7	8–12	.400
Overall record	32–49	34–47	66–96	.407

== Player stats ==
=== Batting ===
Note: G = Games played; AB = At bats; R = Runs scored; H = Hits; 2B = Doubles; 3B = Triples; HR = Home runs; RBI = Runs batted in; SB = Stolen bases; AVG = Batting average

Player	G	AB	R	H	2B	3B	HR	RBI	SB	AVG
Brian Dozier	147	558	72	136	33	4	18	66	14	.244
Justin Morneau	127	495	56	128	32	0	17	74	0	.259
Ryan Doumit	135	485	49	120	28	1	14	55	1	.247
Trevor Plouffe	129	477	44	121	22	1	14	52	2	.254
Joe Mauer	113	445	62	144	35	0	11	47	0	.324
Pedro Florimon	134	403	44	89	17	0	9	44	15	.221
Josh Willingham	111	389	42	81	20	0	14	48	1	.208
Oswaldo Arcia	97	351	34	88	17	2	14	43	1	.251
Chris Parmelee	101	294	21	67	13	0	8	24	1	.228
Clete Thomas	92	290	39	62	15	0	4	13	1	.214
Aaron Hicks	81	281	37	54	11	3	8	27	9	.192
Jamey Carroll	58	191	21	44	6	0	0	9	2	.230
Eduardo Escobar	66	165	23	39	5	2	3	10	0	.236
Chris Colabello	55	160	14	31	3	0	7	17	0	.194
Alex Presley	28	113	9	32	4	1	1	11	1	.283
Wilkin Ramirez	35	81	5	22	6	1	0	6	0	.272
Josmil Pinto	21	76	10	26	5	0	4	12	0	.342
Darin Mastroianni	30	65	5	12	2	0	0	5	2	.185
Doug Bernier	33	53	9	12	3	0	0	5	2	.226
Eric Fryer	6	13	2	5	1	0	1	4	0	.385
Drew Butera	2	3	0	0	0	0	0	0	0	.000
Pitcher Totals	162	19	0	1	0	0	0	0	0	.053
Team totals	162	5564	614	1346	285	15	151	590	52	.242

=== Pitching ===
Note: W = Wins; L = Losses; ERA = Earned run average; G = Games pitched; GS = Games started; SV = Saves; IP = Innings pitched; R = Runs allowed; ER = Earned runs allowed; BB = Walks allowed; K = Strikeouts

Player	W	L	ERA	G	GS	SV	IP	R	ER	BB	K
Kevin Correia	9	13	4.18	31	31	0	185.1	89	86	45	101
Mike Pelfrey	5	13	5.19	29	29	0	152.2	92	88	53	101
Scott Diamond	6	13	5.43	24	24	0	131.0	88	79	36	52
Sam Deduno	8	8	3.83	18	18	0	108.0	48	46	41	67
Anthony Swarzak	3	2	2.91	48	0	0	96.0	33	31	22	69
Ryan Pressly	3	3	3.87	49	0	0	76.2	37	33	27	49
Jared Burton	2	9	3.82	71	0	2	66.0	29	28	22	61
Glen Perkins	2	0	2.30	61	0	36	62.2	16	16	15	77
Josh Roenicke	3	1	4.35	63	0	1	62.0	31	30	36	45
Casey Fien	5	2	3.92	73	0	0	62.0	28	27	12	73
Brian Duensing	6	2	3.98	73	0	1	61.0	28	27	22	56
Andrew Albers	2	5	4.05	10	10	0	60.0	34	27	7	25
Kyle Gibson	2	4	6.53	10	10	0	51.0	38	37	20	29
Vance Worley	1	5	7.21	10	10	0	48.2	43	39	15	25
Liam Hendriks	1	3	6.85	10	8	0	47.1	39	36	14	34
Caleb Thielbar	3	2	1.76	49	0	0	46.0	11	9	14	39
P.J. Walters	2	5	5.95	8	8	0	39.1	30	26	18	22
Cole De Vries	0	2	10.80	4	2	0	15.0	18	18	9	12
Michael Tonkin	0	0	0.79	9	0	0	11.1	6	1	3	10
Shairon Martis	0	1	5.59	6	0	0	9.2	6	6	4	7
Jamey Carroll	0	0	0.00	1	0	0	1.0	0	0	0	0
Tyler Robertson	0	0	9.00	2	0	0	1.0	1	1	0	2
Team totals	66	96	4.55	162	162	40	1450.1	788	733	458	985

== Game log ==
Legend
Twins Win	Twins Loss	Postponed

2013 Game Log (66–96)
April (11–12)

#	Date	Opponent	Score	Win	Loss	Save	Attendance	Record
1	April 1	Tigers	2–4	Verlander (1–0)	Worley (0–1)	Coke (1)	38,282	0–1
2	April 3	Tigers	3–2	Perkins (1–0)	Coke (0–1)	—	22,963	1–1
3	April 4	Tigers	8–2	Pelfrey (1–0)	Porcello (0–1)	—	24,752	2–1
4	April 5	@ Orioles	5–9	Ayala (1–0)	Fien (0–1)	—	46,653	2–2
5	April 6	@ Orioles	6–5	Roenicke (1–0)	Johnson (0–1)	Perkins (1)	40,704	3–2
6	April 7	@ Orioles	4–3	Swarzak (1–0)	Hammel (1–1)	Perkins (2)	34,431	4–2
7	April 8	@ Royals	1–3	Santana (1–1)	Correia (0–1)	Crow (1)	40,073	4–3
8	April 9	@ Royals	4–7	Guthrie (2–0)	Pelfrey (1–1)	Holland (2)	11,697	4–4
9	April 10	@ Royals	0–3	Davis (1–0)	Hendriks (0–1)	Herrera (2)	10,069	4–5
10	April 12	Mets	5–16	Niese (2–0)	Worley (0–2)	—	23,735	4–6
11	April 13	Mets	2–4	Harvey (3–0)	Diamond (0–1)	Parnell (1)	28,804	4–7
–	April 14	Mets	Postponed (snow). Rescheduled for August 19.					
12	April 15	Angels	8–2	Correia (1–1)	Blanton (0–3)	—	23,535	5–7
13	April 16	Angels	8–6	Pelfrey (2–1)	Vargas (0–2)	Perkins (3)	23,299	6–7
–	April 17	Angels	Postponed (rain). Rescheduled for September 9.					
–	April 19	@ White Sox	Postponed (cold, windy conditions). Rescheduled for August 9 as part of a doubleheader.					
14	April 20	@ White Sox	2–1 (10)	Fien (1–1)	Santiago (0–1)	Perkins (4)	22,417	7–7
15	April 21	@ White Sox	5–3	Diamond (1–1)	Lindstrom (1–1)	Perkins (5)	19,587	8–7
–	April 22	Marlins	Postponed (inclement weather). Rescheduled for April 23 as part of a doubleheader.					
16	April 23	Marlins	4–3	Correia (2–1)	Fernández (0–2)	Perkins (6)	25,716	9–7
17	April 23	Marlins	5–8	Nolasco (1–2)	Pelfrey (2–2)	Cishek (2)	23,300	9–8
18	April 25	Rangers	1–2	Tepesch (2–1)	Worley (0–3)	Nathan (7)	25,459	9–9
19	April 26	Rangers	3–4	Grimm (2–0)	Diamond (1–2)	Nathan (8)	27,404	9–10
20	April 27	Rangers	7–2	Hernández (1–0)	Holland (1–2)	—	37,503	10–10
21	April 28	Rangers	5–0	Correia (3–1)	Ogando (2–2)	—	35,751	11–10
22	April 29	@ Tigers	3–4	Scherzer (3–0)	Pelfrey (2–3)	Benoit (2)	29,878	11–11
23	April 30	@ Tigers	1–6	Verlander (3–2)	Worley (0–4)	—	31,748	11–12

May (12–17)

#	Date	Opponent	Score	Win	Loss	Save	Attendance	Record
24	May 1	@ Tigers	6–2	Diamond (2–2)	Sánchez (3–2)	—	36,028	12–12
25	May 3	@ Indians	6–7 (10)	Perez (1–0)	Fien (1–2)	—	20,200	12–13
26	May 4	@ Indians	3–7	Kazmir (1–1)	Correia (3–2)	—	17,830	12–14
27	May 5	@ Indians	4–2	Pelfrey (3–3)	Kluber (2–1)	Perkins (7)	14,015	13–14
28	May 6	@ Red Sox	6–5 (11)	Mortensen (1–2)	Burton (0–1)	—	31,088	13–15
29	May 7	@ Red Sox	6–1	Diamond (3–2)	Dempster (2–3)	—	30,549	14–15
30	May 8	@ Red Sox	15–8	Pressly (1–0)	Webster (0–1)	—	29,969	15–15
31	May 9	@ Red Sox	5–3	Correia (4–2)	Lackey (1–3)	Perkins (8)	31,571	16–15
32	May 10	Orioles	6–9 (10)	Hunter (3–1)	Swarzak (1–1)	J. Johnson (14)	31,360	16–16
33	May 11	Orioles	8–5	Worley (1–4)	S. Johnson (0–1)	Burton (1)	32,221	17–16
34	May 12	Orioles	0–6	Chen (3–3)	Diamond (3–3)	—	34,320	17–17
35	May 13	White Sox	10–3	Hernández (2–0)	Santiago (1–2)	—	25,605	18–17
36	May 14	White Sox	4–2	Peavy (5–1)	Correia (4–3)	Reed (12)	32,023	18–18
37	May 15	White Sox	9–4	Axelrod (1–3)	Pelfrey (3–4)	—	35,613	18–19
38	May 17	Red Sox	2–3 (10)	Wilson (1–0)	Roenicke (1–1)	Uehara (1)	30,210	18–20
39	May 18	Red Sox	5–12	Breslow (1–0)	Diamond (3–4)	—	36,967	18–21
40	May 19	Red Sox	1–5	Lackey (2–4)	Hernández (2–1)	—	33,042	18–22
41	May 20	@ Braves	1–5	Teherán (3–1)	Correia (4–4)	Gearrin (1)	20,173	18–23
42	May 21	@ Braves	4–5 (10)	Kimbrel (1–1)	Duensing (0–1)	—	28,663	18–24
43	May 22	@ Braves	3–8	Maholm (6–4)	Worley (1–5)	—	27,798	18–25
44	May 23	@ Tigers	6–7	Benoit (1–0)	Burton (0–2)	Valverde (5)	32,804	18–26
45	May 24	@ Tigers	0–6	Sánchez (5–4)	Deduno (0–1)	—	39,789	18–27
46	May 25	@ Tigers	3–2	Walters (1–0)	Fister (5–2)	Perkins (9)	41,927	19–27
47	May 26	@ Tigers	1–6	Scherzer (7–0)	Pelfrey (3–5)	—	42,394	19–28
48	May 27	@ Brewers	6–3	Correia (5–4)	Peralta (3–6)	Perkins (10)	38,627	20–28
49	May 28	@ Brewers	6–5 (14)	Pressly (2–0)	Badenhop (0–2)	Duensing (1)	24,415	21–28
50	May 29	Brewers	4–1	Deduno (1–1)	Estrada (4–3)	Perkins (11)	31,359	22–28
51	May 30	Brewers	8–6	Walters (2–0)	Loshe (1–6)	Burton (2)	32,688	23–28
52	May 31	Mariners	0–3	Iwakuma (6–1)	Pelfrey (3–6)	Wilhelmsen (12)	31,430	23–29

June (13–13)

#	Date	Opponent	Score	Win	Loss	Save	Attendance	Record
53	June 1	Mariners	5–4	Thielbar (1–0)	Wilhelmsen (0–1)	—	33,417	24–29
54	June 2	Mariners	10–0	Diamond (4–4)	Bonderman (0–1)	—	34,876	25–29
55	June 4	@ Royals	3–0	Deduno (2–1)	Mendoza (1–3)	Perkins (12)	20,134	26–29
56	June 5	@ Royals	1–4	Guthrie (6–3)	Walters (2–1)	Holland (10)	12,407	26–30
57	June 6	@ Royals	3–7	Collins (2–1)	Burton (0–3)	—	14,942	26–31
	June 7	@ Nationals	Postponed (rain). Doubleheader June 9.					
58	June 8	@ Nationals	4–3 (11)	Roenicke (2–1)	Stammen (3–2)	Perkins (13)	41,587	27–31
59	June 9	@ Nationals	0–7	Zimmermann (9–3)	Diamond (4–5)	—	38,516	27–32
60	June 9	@ Nationals	4–5	Clippard (5–1)	Swarzak (1–2)	Soriano (16)	27,949	27–33
61	June 11	Phillies	3–2	Duensing (1–1)	Adams (1–4)	Perkins (14)	30,104	28–33
62	June 12	Phillies	4–3	Duensing (2–1)	Bastardo (2–2)	Perkins (15)	28,910	29–33
63	June 13	Phillies	2–3	Cliff Lee (8–2)	Burton (0–4)	Papelbon (12)	28,519	29–34
64	June 14	Tigers	0–4	Porcello (4–3)	Diamond (4–6)	—	29,571	29–35
65	June 15	Tigers	6–3	Deduno (3–1)	Downs (0–2)	Perkins (16)	35,017	30–35
66	June 16	Tigers	2–5	Fister (6–4)	Walters (2–2)	Benoit (4)	39,317	30–36
67	June 18	White Sox	7–5	Burton (1–4)	Troncoso (0–2)	Perkins (17)	30,387	31–36
68	June 19	White Sox	7–4	Correia (6–4)	Sale (5–6)	Perkins (18)	30,003	32–36
69	June 20	White Sox	8–4	Diamond (5–6)	Danks (1–4)	—	35,837	33–36
70	June 21	@ Indians	1–5	Kazmir (4–4)	Deduno (3–2)	—	26,442	33–37
71	June 22	@ Indians	7–8	Kluber (6–4)	Walters (3–2)	Pestano (3)	21,417	33–38
72	June 23	@ Indians	5–3	Hernández (3–1)	Carrasco (0–3)	Perkins (19)	17,143	34–38
73	June 25	@ Marlins	2–4	Ramos (2–2)	Correia (6–5)	Cishek (13)	14,581	34–39
74	June 26	@ Marlins	3–5	Slowey (3–6)	Diamond (5–7)	Cishek (14)	15,318	34–40
75	June 27	Royals	3–1	Deduno (4–2)	Guthrie (7–6)	Perkins (19)	28,040	35–40
76	June 28	Royals	3–9	Shields (3–6)	Walters (2–4)	—	28,916	35–41
77	June 29	Royals	6–2	Gibson (1–0)	Davis (4–6)	—	36,881	36–41
78	June 30	Royals	8–9	Crow (5–3)	Burton (1–5)	Holland (17)	34,232	36–42

July (9–17)

#	Date	Opponent	Score	Win	Loss	Save	Attendance	Record
79	July 1	Yankees	4–10	Chamberlain (1–0)	Burton (1–6)	—	29,619	36–43
80	July 2	Yankees	3–7	Hughes (4–7)	Deduno (4–3)	Rivera (27)	29,029	36–44
81	July 3	Yankees	2–3	Sabathia (9–6)	Walters (2–5)	Rivera (28)	38,457	36–45
82	July 4	Yankees	5–9	Phelps (6–5)	Gibson (1–1)	—	38,260	36–46
83	July 5	@ Blue Jays	0–4	Buehrle (5–5)	Correia (6–6)	—	25,672	36–47
84	July 6	@ Blue Jays	6–0	Pelfrey (4–6)	Dickey (8–9)	—	37,034	37–47
85	July 7	@ Blue Jays	5–11	Redmond (1–1)	Diamond (5–8)	—	43,795	37–48
86	July 8	@ Rays	4–7	Torres (3–0)	Deduno (4–4)	Rodney (20)	11,516	37–49
87	July 9	@ Rays	1–4	Archer (3–3)	Gibson (1–2)	Rodney (21)	12,777	37–50
88	July 10	@ Rays	3–4 (13)	Ramos (2–2)	Pressly (2–1)	—	12,757	37–51
89	July 11	@ Rays	3–4	Moore (13–3)	Pelfrey (4–7)	McGee (1)	24,751	37–52
90	July 12	@ Yankees	0–2	Kuroda (8–6)	Pressly (2–2)	Rivera (30)	40,247	37–53
91	July 13	@ Yankees	4–1	Deduno (5–4)	Hughes (4–9)	Perkins (21)	40,301	38–53
92	July 14	@ Yankees	10–4	Gibson (2–2)	Sabathia (9–8)	—	43,131	39–53
93	July 19	Indians	3–2	Fien (2–2)	Smith (4–1)	Perkins (22)	36,280	40–53
94	July 20	Indians	3–2	Correia (7–6)	Hill (1–2)	Perkins (23)	38,626	41–53
95	July 21	Indians	1–7	Masterson (11–7)	Diamond (5–9)	—	31,753	41–54
96	July 22	@ Angels	4–3	Deduno (6–4)	Blanton (2–13)	Perkins (24)	33,363	42–54
97	July 23	@ Angels	10–3 (10)	Perkins (2–0)	Frieri (0–2)	—	39,177	43–54
98	July 24	@ Angels	0–1	Weaver (5–5)	Pelfrey (4–8)	Frieri (25)	38,209	43–55
99	July 25	@ Mariners	2–8	Iwakuma (10–4)	Correia (7–7)	—	18,135	43–56
100	July 26	@ Mariners	3–2	Duensing (3–1)	Medina (3–3)	Perkins (25)	23,162	44–56
101	July 27	@ Mariners	4–0	Deduno (7–4)	Harang (5–9)	—	24,524	45–56
102	July 28	@ Mariners	4–6	Ramírez (2–0)	Gibson (2–3)	Wilhelmsen (24)	35,087	45–57
103	July 30	Royals	2–7	Santana (7–6)	Pelfrey (4–9)	—	33,085	45–58
104	July 31	Royals	3–4	Gutherie (11–7)	Thielbar (1–1)	Holland (28)	32,789	45–59

August (13–17)

#	Date	Opponent	Score	Win	Loss	Save	Attendance	Record
105	August 1	Royals	2–7	Shields (6–7)	Diamond (5–10)	—	35,448	45–60
106	August 2	Astros	4–3	Pressly (3–2)	Keuchel (5–6)	—	30,633	46–60
107	August 3	Astros	6–4	Duensing (4–1)	Harrell (5–12)	Perkins (26)	38,078	47–60
108	August 4	Astros	3–2	Thielbar (2–1)	Peacock (1–4)	Perkins (27)	34,780	48–60
109	August 5	@ Royals	0–13	Guthrie (12–7)	Correia (7–8)	—	21,474	48–61
110	August 6	@ Royals	7–0	Albers (1–0)	Shields (6–8)	—	18,924	49–61
111	August 7	@ Royals	2–5	Coleman (2–0)	Deduno (7–5)	Holland (30)	20,198	49–62
112	August 9	@ White Sox	7–5	Duensing (5–1)	Veal (1–3)	—	17,439	50–62
113	August 9	@ White Sox	3–2 (10)	Duensing (6–1)	Axelrod (4–9)	Perkins (28)	23,804	51–62
114	August 10	@ White Sox	4–5	Purcey (1–1)	Pelfrey (4–10)	Reed (28)	24,529	51–63
115	August 11	@ White Sox	5–2	Correia (8–8)	Quintana (6–4)	—	26,344	52–63
116	August 12	Indians	3–0	Albers (2–0)	Salazar (1–1)	—	30,922	53–63
117	August 13	Indians	2–5	McAllister (5–7)	Deduno (7–6)	Perez (19)	29,806	53–64
118	August 14	Indians	8–9 (12)	Perez (5–2)	Pressly (3–3)	Smith (2)	35,133	53–65
119	August 15	White Sox	4–3	Burton (2–6)	Troncoso (1–4)	—	32,851	54–65
120	August 16	White Sox	2–5	Quintana (7–4)	Correia (8–9)	Reed (29)	28,834	54–66
121	August 17	White Sox	5–8	Sale (9–11)	Albers (2–1)	Reed (30)	36,833	54–67
122	August 18	White Sox	2–5	Santiago (4–7)	Deduno (7–7)	Reed (31)	32,905	54–68
123	August 19	Mets	1–6	Gee (9–8)	Gibson (2–4)	—	30,913	54–69
124	August 20	@ Tigers	6–3	Pelfrey (5–10)	Porcello (9–7)	Perkins (29)	37,964	55–69
125	August 21	@ Tigers	1–7	Smyly (5–0)	Correia (8–10)	Veras (20)	38,092	55–70
126	August 22	@ Tigers	7–6	Fien (3–2)	Rondon (1–2)	Perkins (30)	39,653	56–70
127	August 23	@ Indians	5–1	Deduno (8–7)	Jiménez (9–8)	—	23,218	57–70
128	August 24	@ Indians	2–7	McAllister (7–7)	Hendriks (0–2)	—	23,218	57–71
129	August 25	@ Indians	1–3	Smith (5–1)	Burton (2–7)	Perez (21)	21,042	57–72
130	August 27	Royals	1–6	Shields (9–8)	Burton (2–8)	—	27,006	57–73
131	August 28	Royals	1–8	Duffy (2–0)	Albers (2–2)	—	27,379	57–74
132	August 29	Royals	1–3	Chen (6–2)	Deduno (8–8)	Holland (36)	28,012	57–75
133	August 30	@ Rangers	3–2	Hendriks (1–2)	Darvish (12–6)	Perkins (31)	34,815	58–75
134	August 31	@ Rangers	1–2	Nathan (5–2)	Thielbar (2–2)	—	36,041	58–76

September (8–21)

#	Date	Opponent	Score	Win	Loss	Save	Attendance	Record
135	September 1	@ Rangers	4–2	Correia (9–10)	Blackley (2–2)	Perkins (31)	36,549	59–76
136	September 2	@ Astros	10–6	Roenicke (3–1)	Lo (0–3)	—	14,287	60–76
137	September 3	@ Astros	9–6	Thielbar (3–2)	Chapman (0–1)	—	13,500	61–76
138	September 4	@ Astros	5–6	Bédard (4–10)	Duensing (6–2)	—	14,869	61–77
139	September 6	Blue Jays	5–6	Dickey (12–12)	Pelfrey (5–11)	Janssen (28)	27,044	61–78
140	September 7	Blue Jays	2–11	Happ (4–5)	Correia (9–11)	—	32,882	61–79
141	September 8	Blue Jays	0–2	Rogers (5–7)	Burton (2–9)	Janssen (29)	29,450	61–80
142	September 9	Angels	6–3	Fien (4–2)	Rasmus (0–1)	Perkins (33)	21,826	62–80
143	September 10	Athletics	4–3	Swarzak (2–2)	Cook (6–4)	Perkins (34)	26,017	63–80
144	September 11	Athletics	3–18	Gray (3–3)	Pelfrey (5–12)	—	24,522	63–81
145	September 12	Athletics	2–8	Griffin (14–9)	Diamond (5–11)	—	26,188	63–82
146	September 13	Rays	0–3	Archer (9–7)	Correia (9–12)	Rodney (35)	27,292	63–83
147	September 14	Rays	0–7	Gomes (1–1)	Albers (2–3)	—	28,541	63–84
148	September 15	Rays	6–4	Fien (5–2)	Peralta (2–8)	Perkins (35)	27,988	64–84
149	September 16	@ White Sox	1–12	Johnson (1–2)	Hendriks (1–3)	—	15,018	64–85
150	September 17	@ White Sox	3–4	Quintana (8–6)	Pelfrey (5–13)	Reed (38)	15,964	64–86
151	September 18	@ White Sox	4–3	Diamond (6–11)	Danks (4–14)	Perkins (36)	14,520	65–86
152	September 19	@ Athletics	6–8	Doolittle (5–5)	Martis (0–1)	—	11,461	65–87
153	September 20	@ Athletics	0–11	Colón (17–6)	Albers (2–4)	—	36,067	65–88
154	September 21	@ Athletics	1–9	Parker (12–7)	Hernández (3–2)	—	26,393	65–89
155	September 22	@ Athletics	7–11	Gray (4–3)	De Vries (0–1)	—	30,589	65–90
156	September 23	Tigers	4–3	Swarzak (2–2)	Putkonen (1–2)	—	24,647	66–90
157	September 24	Tigers	2–4	Fister (14–9)	Diamond (6–12)	Benoit (23)	25,541	66–91
158	September 25	Tigers	1–0	Scherzer (21–3)	Correia (9–13)	Benoit (24)	26,517	66–92
159	September 26	Indians	5–6	Shaw (7–3)	Albers (2–5)	Smith (3)	24,929	66–93
160	September 27	Indians	6–12	Kluber (11–5)	Hernández (3–3)	—	24,074	66–94
161	September 28	Indians	1–5	Kazmir (10–9)	De Vries (0–2)	—	30,452	66–95
162	September 29	Indians	1–5	Jiménez (13–9)	Diamond (6–13)	—	30,935	66–96

== Roster ==
2013 Minnesota Twins
Roster
Pitchers: 63 Andrew Albers; 61 Jared Burton; 30 Kevin Correia; 38 Cole De Vries; 21 Samuel Deduno; 58 Scott Diamond; 52 Brian Duensing; 50 Casey Fien; 44 Kyle Gibson; 62 Liam Hendriks; 60 Pedro Hernández; 64 Shairon Martis; 37 Mike Pelfrey; 15 Glen Perkins; 57 Ryan Pressly; 64 Tyler Robertson; 20 Josh Roenicke; 51 Anthony Swarzak; 56 Caleb Thielbar; 59 Michael Tonkin; 39 P. J. Walters; 49 Vance Worley	Catchers: 41 Drew Butera; 9 Ryan Doumit; 54 Eric Fryer; 12,44 Chris Herrmann; 7 Joe Mauer; 43 Josmil Pinto; Infielders: 17 Doug Bernier; 8 Jamey Carroll; 55 Chris Colabello; 2 Brian Dozier; 5 Eduardo Escobar; 25 Pedro Florimón; 33 Justin Morneau; 24 Trevor Plouffe	Outfielders: 31 Oswaldo Arcia; 32 Aaron Hicks; 19 Darin Mastroianni; 27 Chris Parmelee; 1 Alex Presley; 22 Wilkin Ramírez; 11 Clete Thomas; 16 Josh Willingham	Manager: 35 Ron Gardenhire; Coaches: 40 Rick Anderson (pitching); 23 Tom Brunansky (hitting); 18 Bobby Cuellar (bullpen); 75 Nate Dammann (bullpen catcher); 36 Terry Steinbach (bench); 45 Scott Ullger (first base); 46 Joe Vavra (third base)

== Other post-season awards ==
- Calvin R. Griffith Award (Most Valuable Twin) – Joe Mauer
- Joseph W. Haynes Award (Twins Pitcher of the Year) – Glen Perkins
- Bill Boni Award (Twins Outstanding Rookie) – Caleb Thielbar
- Charles O. Johnson Award (Most Improved Twin) – Brian Dozier
- Jim Kaat Award (Defensive Player of the Year) – Pedro Florimón
- Dick Siebert Award (Upper Midwest Player of the Year) – Jordan Zimmermann
- Bob Allison Award (Leadership Award) – Justin Morneau
- Mike Augustin Award ("Media Good Guy" Award) – Brian Dozier
  - The above awards are voted on by the Twin Cities chapter of the BBWAA
- Carl R. Pohlad Award (Outstanding Community Service) – Glen Perkins
- Sherry Robertson Award (Twins Outstanding Farm System Position Player) – Byron Buxton
- Jim Rantz Award (Twins Outstanding Farm System Pitcher) – Andrew Albers
- Kirby Puckett Award (Alumni Community Service) – Frank Quilici
- Herb Carneal Award (Lifetime Achievement Award) – Tony Oliva

== Farm system ==
Level	Team	League	Manager
AAA	Rochester Red Wings	International League	Gene Glynn
AA	New Britain Rock Cats	Eastern League	Jeff Smith
A	Fort Myers Miracle	Florida State League	Doug Mientkiewicz
A	Cedar Rapids Kernels	Midwest League	Jake Mauer
Rookie	Elizabethton Twins	Appalachian League	Ray Smith
Rookie	GCL Twins	Gulf Coast League	Ramon Borrego
