= 2013 Baltimore Orioles season =

Major League Baseball season

2013 Baltimore Orioles
- League: American League
- Division: East
- Ballpark: Oriole Park at Camden Yards
- City: Baltimore, Maryland
- Record: 85–77 (.525)
- Divisional place: 4th
- Owners: Peter Angelos
- President of baseball operations: Dan Duquette
- General managers: Dan Duquette
- Managers: Buck Showalter
- Television: MASN; WJZ-TV (CBS 13) (Gary Thorne, Jim Palmer, Mike Bordick, Jim Hunter)
- Radio: Baltimore Orioles Radio Network (Joe Angel, Fred Manfra)

The 2013 Baltimore Orioles season was the 113th season in franchise history, the 60th in Baltimore, and the 22nd at Oriole Park at Camden Yards. The Orioles began the 2013 season on April 2 against the Tampa Bay Rays.

The Orioles set team fielding records in the modern era, with the fewest errors in a 162-game season (54) and highest team fielding percentage (.991).

== Spring training ==
The Orioles finished preseason spring training with a 19–9 win–loss record, the best record in the Grapefruit League. This excludes four tie games, which did not count toward the standings.

== Roster ==
2013 Baltimore Orioles
Roster
Pitchers: 34 Jake Arrieta; 63 Jairo Asencio; 38 Luis Ayala; 65 Mike Belfiore; 53 Zach Britton; 68 Alex Burnett; 16 Wei-Yin Chen; 64 Zach Clark; 34 Scott Feldman; 38 Freddy García; 37 Kevin Gausman; 50 Miguel González; 39 Jason Hammel; 29 Tommy Hunter; 43 Jim Johnson; 52 Steve Johnson; 49 Jair Jurrjens; 17 Brian Matusz; 66 T. J. McFarland; 25 Bud Norris; 56 Darren O'Day; 40 Troy Patton; 57 Francisco Rodríguez; 60 Josh Stinson; 47 Pedro Strop; 30 Chris Tillman	Catchers: 45 Steve Clevenger; 48 Chris Snyder; 31 Taylor Teagarden; 32 Matt Wieters; Infielders: 24 Wilson Betemit; 12 Alexi Casilla; 19 Chris Davis; 3 Ryan Flaherty; 2 J. J. Hardy; 45 Travis Ishikawa; 55 Dan Johnson; 13 Manny Machado; 54 Yamaico Navarro; 1 Brian Roberts; 6 Jonathan Schoop; 35 Danny Valencia	Outfielders: 60,36 Chris Dickerson; 25 L. J. Hoes; 10 Adam Jones; 21 Nick Markakis; 9 Nate McLouth; 38 Mike Morse; 28 Steve Pearce; 24 Jason Pridie; 14 Nolan Reimold; 51 Henry Urrutia	Manager: 26 Buck Showalter; Coaches: 41 Rick Adair (pitching); 62 Rudy Árias (bullpen catcher); 47 Bill Castro (bullpen); 67 Ronnie Deck (bullpen catcher); 58 Einar Díaz (assistant hitting); 11 Bobby Dickerson (third base); 23 Wayne Kirby (first base); 15 Jim Presley (hitting); 77 John Russell (bench)

== Player stats ==
Note: G = Games played; AB = At bats; R = Runs; H = Hits; 2B = Doubles; 3B = Triples; HR = Home runs; RBI = Runs batted in; SB = Stolen bases; BB = Walks; AVG = Batting average; SLG = Slugging average

Player	G	AB	R	H	2B	3B	HR	RBI	SB	BB	AVG	SLG
Manny Machado	156	667	88	189	51	3	14	71	6	29	.283	.432
Adam Jones	160	653	100	186	35	1	33	108	14	25	.285	.493
Nick Markakis	160	634	89	172	24	0	10	59	1	55	.271	.356
J.J. Hardy	159	601	66	158	27	0	25	76	2	38	.263	.433
Chris Davis	160	584	103	167	42	1	53	138	4	72	.286	.634
Nate McLouth	146	531	76	137	31	4	12	36	30	53	.258	.399
Matt Wieters	148	523	59	123	29	0	22	79	2	43	.235	.417
Brian Roberts	77	265	33	66	12	1	8	39	3	26	.249	.392
Ryan Flaherty	85	246	28	55	11	0	10	27	2	19	.224	.390
Danny Valencia	52	161	20	49	14	1	8	23	0	8	.304	.553
Nolan Reimold	40	128	17	25	3	0	5	12	0	10	.195	.336
Steve Pearce	44	119	14	31	7	0	4	13	1	15	.261	.420
Alexi Casilla	62	112	15	24	4	1	1	10	9	9	.214	.295
Chris Dickerson	56	105	17	25	5	0	4	13	5	4	.238	.400
Taylor Teagarden	23	60	3	10	2	0	2	5	0	1	.167	.300
Henry Urrutia	24	58	5	16	0	1	0	2	0	0	.276	.310
Mike Morse	12	29	3	3	0	0	0	0	0	1	.103	.103
Yamaico Navarro	8	28	3	8	0	1	0	2	0	2	.286	.357
Chris Snyder	9	20	0	2	0	0	0	1	0	4	.100	.100
Travis Ishikawa	6	17	0	2	0	0	0	1	0	1	.118	.118
Steve Clevenger	4	15	1	4	1	0	0	2	0	0	.267	.333
Jonathan Schoop	5	14	5	4	0	0	1	1	0	1	.286	.500
Jason Pridie	4	10	0	2	0	0	0	1	0	0	.200	.200
Wilson Betemit	6	10	0	0	0	0	0	0	0	0	.000	.000
Dan Johnson	3	5	0	0	0	0	0	0	0	0	.000	.000
L.J. Hoes	1	3	0	0	0	0	0	0	0	0	.000	.000
Pitcher totals	162	22	0	2	0	0	0	0	0	0	.091	.091
Team totals	162	5620	745	1460	298	14	212	719	79	416	.260	.431

=== Pitching ===
Note: W = Wins; L = Losses; ERA = Earned run average; G = Games pitched; GS = Games started; SV = Saves; IP = Innings pitched; H = Hits allowed; R = Runs allowed; ER = Earned runs allowed; BB = Walks allowed; SO = Strikeouts

Player	W	L	ERA	G	GS	SV	IP	H	R	ER	BB	SO
Chris Tillman	16	7	3.71	33	33	0	206.1	184	87	85	68	179
Miguel González	11	8	3.78	30	28	0	171.1	157	81	72	53	120
Jason Hammel	7	8	4.97	26	23	1	139.1	155	81	77	48	96
Wei-Yin Chen	7	7	4.07	23	23	0	137.0	142	62	62	39	104
Scott Feldman	5	6	4.27	15	15	0	90.2	80	45	43	31	65
Tommy Hunter	6	5	2.81	68	0	4	86.1	71	28	27	14	68
TJ McFarland	4	1	4.22	38	1	0	74.2	83	37	35	28	58
Jim Johnson	3	8	2.94	74	0	50	70.1	72	26	23	18	56
Darren O'Day	5	3	2.18	68	0	2	62.0	47	16	15	15	59
Troy Patton	2	0	3.70	56	0	0	56.0	57	25	23	16	42
Freddy García	3	5	5.77	11	10	0	53.0	60	35	34	12	26
Brian Matusz	2	1	3.53	65	0	0	51.0	43	21	20	16	50
Bud Norris	4	3	4.80	11	9	0	50.2	61	27	27	24	57
Kevin Gausman	3	5	5.66	20	5	0	47.2	51	30	30	13	49
Zach Britton	2	3	4.95	8	7	0	40.0	52	23	22	17	18
Jake Arrieta	1	2	7.23	5	5	0	23.2	25	19	19	17	23
Pedro Strop	0	3	7.25	29	0	0	22.1	23	19	18	15	24
Francisco Rodriguez	2	1	4.50	23	0	0	22.0	25	11	11	5	28
Josh Stinson	0	0	3.18	11	1	0	17.0	10	7	6	3	12
Steve Johnson	1	1	7.47	9	1	0	15.2	14	13	13	13	20
Jair Jurrjens	0	0	4.91	2	1	0	7.1	9	4	4	1	6
Jairo Asencio	0	0	7.71	4	0	0	2.1	3	2	2	2	4
Luis Ayala	1	0	9.00	2	0	0	2.0	4	2	2	0	2
Zach Clark	0	0	16.20	1	0	0	1.2	3	3	3	2	1
Mike Belfiore	0	0	13.50	1	0	0	1.1	3	2	2	1	0
Alex Burnett	0	0	20.25	2	0	0	1.1	4	3	3	2	2
Team totals	85	77	4.20	162	162	57	1453.0	1438	709	678	473	1169

=== Accolades ===
The following players represented the Orioles in the 2013 Major League Baseball All-Star Game:

- Chris Davis
- J. J. Hardy
- Adam Jones
- Manny Machado
- Chris Tillman

The following players received Gold Glove Awards for the 2013 MLB season:

- J. J. Hardy
- Adam Jones
- Manny Machado

The following player received the American League Platinum Glove Award for the 2013 MLB season:

- Manny Machado

The following players received Silver Slugger Awards for the 2013 MLB season:

- Chris Davis
- J. J. Hardy
- Adam Jones

1st baseman Chris Davis won the American League home run championship (53) and RBI championship (138), and set franchise records for home runs and extra-base hits (96).

The Orioles set a major league record for fewest errors in a full season with 54.

== Game log ==
Games legend
Orioles Win	Orioles Loss	Game postponed	Clinched playoff spot	Eliminated from playoff contention
Boldface text denotes an Orioles pitcher

Baltimore Orioles 2013 Season Game Log — Season Record: 85–77 (.525) – home (46–35) – road (39–42)
April (16–11) – home (7–5) – road (9–6)

#	Date	Opponent	Score	Win	Loss	Save	Stadium	Attendance	Record	Box/ Streak
1	April 2	@ Rays	7–4	**Hammel** (1–0)	McGee (0–1)	**J. Johnson** (1)	Tropicana Field	34,078	1–0	W1
2	April 3	@ Rays	7–8	Rodney (1–0)	**Hunter** (0–1)		Tropicana Field	15,599	1–1	L1
3	April 4	@ Rays	6–3	**González** (1–0)	Hernández (0–1)	**J. Johnson** (2)	Tropicana Field	17,491	2–1	W1
4	April 5	Twins	9–5	**Ayala** (1–0)	Fien (0–1)		**Camden Yards**	46,653	3–1	W2
5	April 6	Twins	5–6	Roenicke (1–0)	**J. Johnson** (0–1)	Perkins (1)	**Camden Yards**	40,704	3–2	L1
6	April 7	Twins	3–4	Swarzak (1–0)	**Hammel** (1–1)	Perkins (2)	**Camden Yards**	34,431	3–3	L2
7	April 8	@ Red Sox	1–3	Buchholz (2–0)	**Chen** (0–1)	Hanrahan (3)	Fenway Park	37,008	3–4	L3
8	April 10	@ Red Sox	8–5	**O'Day** (1–0)	Hanrahan (0–1)	**J. Johnson** (3)	Fenway Park	30,862	4–4	W1
9	April 11	@ Red Sox	3–2	**Matusz** (1–0)	Mortensen (0–1)	**J. Johnson** (4)	Fenway Park	27,704	5–4	W2
10	April 12	@ Yankees	2–5	Sabathia (2–1)	**González** (1–1)	Rivera (2)	Yankee Stadium	35,033	5–5	L1
11	April 13	@ Yankees	5–3	**Hammel** (2–1)	Hughes (0–2)	**J. Johnson** (5)	Yankee Stadium	41,851	6–5	W1
12	April 14	@ Yankees	0–3	Kuroda (2–1)	**Chen** (0–2)		Yankee Stadium	34,154	6–6	L1
13	April 16	Rays	5–4	**Arrieta** (1–0)	Hernández (0–3)	**J. Johnson** (6)	**Camden Yards**	14,670	7–6	W1
14	April 17	Rays	2–6	Moore (3–0)	**Tillman** (0–1)		**Camden Yards**	13,591	7–7	L1
15	April 18	Rays	10–6 (10)	**Patton** (1–0)	Wright (0–1)		**Camden Yards**	13,986	8–7	W1
–	April 19	Dodgers	Postponed (rain). Makeup date April 20 as part of doubleheader.							
16	April 20	Dodgers	7–5	**O'Day** (2–0)	Rodriguez (0–1)	**J. Johnson** (7)	**Camden Yards**	26,811	9–7	W2
17	April 20	Dodgers	6–1	**Chen** (1–2)	Beckett (0–3)	**Hunter** (1)	**Camden Yards**	45,248	10–7	W3
18	April 21	Dodgers	4–7	Howell (1–0)	**Arrieta** (1–1)	League (5)	**Camden Yards**	41,265	10–8	L1
19	April 22	Blue Jays	2–1	**J. Johnson** (1–1)	Loup (1–2)		**Camden Yards**	11,168	11–8	W1
20	April 23	Blue Jays	4–3	**González** (2–1)	Dickey (2–3)	**J. Johnson** (8)	**Camden Yards**	13,272	12–8	W2
21	April 24	Blue Jays	5–6 (11)	Rogers (1–1)	**J. Johnson** (1–2)	Janssen (6)	**Camden Yards**	14,981	12–9	L1
22	April 25	@ Athletics	10–2	**Hammel** (3–1)	Parker (0–4)		O.co Coliseum	11,220	13–9	W1
23	April 26	@ Athletics	3–0	**Chen** (2–2)	Milone (3–2)	**J. Johnson** (9)	O.co Coliseum	16,944	14–9	W2
24	April 27	@ Athletics	7–3	**Tillman** (1–1)	Griffin (2–2)	**J. Johnson** (10)	O.co Coliseum	31,292	15–9	W3
25	April 28	@ Athletics	8–9 (10)	Blevins (1–0)	**Strop** (0–1)		O.co Coliseum	27,475	15–10	L1
26	April 29	@ Mariners	2–6	Saunders (2–3)	**Britton** (0–1)		Safeco Field	9,818	15–11	L2
27	April 30	@ Mariners	7–2	**Hammel** (4–1)	Maurer (2–4)		Safeco Field	13,629	16–11	W1

May (15–13) – home (7–7) – road (8–6)

#	Date	Opponent	Score	Win	Loss	Save	Stadium	Attendance	Record	Box/ Streak
28	May 1	@ Mariners	3–8	Harang (1–3)	**Chen** (2–3)		Safeco Field	12,936	16–12	L1
29	May 2	@ Angels	5–1	**Tillman** (2–1)	Blanton (0–5)		Angel Stadium of Anaheim	35,118	17–12	W1
30	May 3	@ Angels	0–4	Vargas (1–3)	**González** (2–2)		Angel Stadium of Anaheim	40,140	17–13	L1
31	May 4	@ Angels	5–4 (10)	**Hunter** (1–1)	Richards (1–3)	**J. Johnson** (11)	Angel Stadium of Anaheim	32,136	18–13	W1
32	May 5	@ Angels	8–4	**Hammel** (5–1)	Williams (1–1)	**O'Day** (1)	Angel Stadium of Anaheim	38,047	19–13	W2
33	May 7	Royals	4–3	**Hunter** (2–1)	Collins (1–1)	**J. Johnson** (12)	**Camden Yards**	12,921	20–13	W3
34	May 8	Royals	5–3	**Tillman** (3–1)	Mendoza (0–2)	**J. Johnson** (13)	**Camden Yards**	12,344	21–13	W4
35	May 9	Royals	2–6	Guthrie (5–0)	**García** (0–1)		**Camden Yards**	23,282	21–14	L1
36	May 10	@ Twins	9–6 (10)	**Hunter** (3–1)	Swarzak (1–1)	**J. Johnson** (14)	Target Field	31,360	22–14	W1
37	May 11	@ Twins	5–8	Worley (1–4)	**S. Johnson** (0–1)	Burton (1)	Target Field	32,221	22–15	L1
38	May 12	@ Twins	6–0	**Chen** (3–3)	Diamond (3–3)		Target Field	34,320	23–15	W1
39	May 14	Padres	2–3	Gregerson (2–2)	**J. Johnson** (1–3)	Street (9)	**Camden Yards**	19,096	23–16	L1
40	May 15	Padres	4–8	Marquis (5–2)	**García** (0–2)		**Camden Yards**	32,418	23–17	L2
41	May 17	Rays	10–12	Hellickson (2–2)	**Hammel** (5–2)	Peralta (1)	**Camden Yards**	38,061	23–18	L3
42	May 18	Rays	6–10	Torres (1–0)	**J. Johnson** (1–4)		**Camden Yards**	34,685	23–19	L4
43	May 19	Rays	1–3	Moore (8–0)	**Tillman** (3–2)	Rodney (8)	**Camden Yards**	37,704	23–20	L5
44	May 20	Yankees	4–6 (10)	Robertson (3–0)	**Strop** (0–2)	Rivera (17)	**Camden Yards**	24,133	23–21	L6
45	May 21	Yankees	3–2 (10)	**J. Johnson** (2–4)	Nuño (1–1)		**Camden Yards**	29,040	24–21	W1
46	May 22	Yankees	6–3	**Hammel** (6–2)	Kuroda (6–3)		**Camden Yards**	26,725	25–21	W2
47	May 23	@ Blue Jays	6–12	Morrow (2–3)	**Gausman** (0–1)		Rogers Centre	21,466	25–22	L1
48	May 24	@ Blue Jays	10–6	**Tillman** (4–2)	Nolin (0–1)		Rogers Centre	25,104	26–22	W1
49	May 25	@ Blue Jays	6–5	**García** (1–2)	Dickey (4–6)	**J. Johnson** (15)	Rogers Centre	35,915	27–22	W2
50	May 26	@ Blue Jays	5–6	Delabar (4–1)	**J. Johnson** (2–5)		Rogers Centre	28,502	27–23	L1
51	May 27	@ Nationals	6–2	**Hammel** (7–2)	Gonzalez (3–3)		Nationals Park	41,260	28–23	W1
52	May 28	@ Nationals	3–9	Duke (1–1)	**Gausman** (0–2)		Nationals Park	35,664	28–24	L1
53	May 29	Nationals	9–6	**S. Johnson** (1–1)	Zimmermann (8–3)	**J. Johnson** (16)	**Camden Yards**	39,129	29–24	W1
54	May 30	Nationals	2–0	**García** (2–2)	Haren (4–6)	**J. Johnson** (17)	**Camden Yards**	30,665	30–24	W2
55	May 31	Tigers	7–5	**O'Day** (3–0)	Valverde (0–1)		**Camden Yards**	46,249	31–24	W3

June (16–12) – home (11–5) – road (5–7)

#	Date	Opponent	Score	Win	Loss	Save	Stadium	Attendance	Record	Box/ Streak
56	June 1	Tigers	3–10	Verlander (7–4)	**Hammel** (7–3)		**Camden Yards**	38,945	31–25	L1
57	June 2	Tigers	4–2	**Matusz** (2–0)	Porcello (2–3)	**J. Johnson** (18)	**Camden Yards**	39,182	32–25	W1
58	June 4	@ Astros	4–1	**Tillman** (5–2)	Harrell (4–7)	**J. Johnson** (19)	Minute Maid Park	15,920	33–25	W2
59	June 5	@ Astros	7–11	Keuchel (3–2)	**García** (2–3)		Minute Maid Park	15,526	33–26	L1
60	June 6	@ Astros	3–1	**González** (3–2)	Norris (5–5)	**J. Johnson** (20)	Minute Maid Park	14,664	34–26	W1
61	June 7	@ Rays	1–2	Archer (1–1)	**Hammel** (7–4)	Rodney (13)	Tropicana Field	13,256	34–27	L1
62	June 8	@ Rays	0–8	Hellickson (4–2)	**Gausman** (0–3)		Tropicana Field	21,834	34–28	L2
63	June 9	@ Rays	10–7	**Tillman** (6–2)	Moore (8–2)	**J. Johnson** (21)	Tropicana Field	19,921	35–28	W1
64	June 10	Angels	4–3	**García** (3–3)	Weaver (1–2)	**J. Johnson** (22)	**Camden Yards**	15,514	36–28	W2
65	June 11	Angels	3–2	**González** (4–2)	Vargas (5–4)	**J. Johnson** (23)	**Camden Yards**	22,834	37–28	W3
66	June 12	Angels	5–9	Williams (5–2)	**Strop** (0–3)		**Camden Yards**	25,964	37–29	L1
67	June 13	Red Sox	5–4 (13)	**McFarland** (1–0)	Wilson (1–1)		**Camden Yards**	20,098	38–29	W1
68	June 14	Red Sox	2–0	**Tillman** (7–2)	Dempster (4–7)	**J. Johnson** (24)	**Camden Yards**	39,158	39–29	W2
69	June 15	Red Sox	4–5	Lackey (4–5)	**García** (3–4)	Bailey (8)	**Camden Yards**	42,422	39–30	L1
70	June 16	Red Sox	6–3	**González** (5–2)	Lester (6–4)	**J. Johnson** (25)	**Camden Yards**	41,311	40–30	W1
71	June 17	@ Tigers	1–5	Scherzer (10–0)	**Arrieta** (1–2)	Smyly (2)	Comerica Park	32,525	40–31	L1
72	June 18	@ Tigers	5–2	**Britton** (1–1)	Verlander (8–5)	**J. Johnson** (26)	Comerica Park	34,706	41–31	W1
73	June 19	@ Tigers	13–3	**Tillman** (8–2)	Porcello (4–4)		Comerica Park	38,574	42–31	W2
74	June 21	@ Blue Jays	6–7	Janssen (2–0)	**Matusz** (2–1)		Rogers Centre	35,472	42–32	L1
75	June 22	@ Blue Jays	2–4	Oliver (3–1)	**González** (5–3)	Janssen (17)	Rogers Centre	43,261	42–33	L2
76	June 23	@ Blue Jays	5–13	Johnson (1–2)	**García** (3–5)		Rogers Centre	45,214	42–34	L3
77	June 24	Indians	2–5	Jiménez (6–4)	**Britton** (1–2)	Pestano (4)	**Camden Yards**	18,544	42–35	L4
78	June 25	Indians	6–3	**Tillman** (9–2)	Masterson (9–6)	**J. Johnson** (27)	**Camden Yards**	20,924	43–35	W1
79	June 26	Indians	3–4	Smith (4–0)	**J. Johnson** (2–6)	Pestano (5)	**Camden Yards**	18,082	43–36	L1
80	June 27	Indians	7–3	**González** (6–3)	Kluber (6–5)		**Camden Yards**	33,036	44–36	W1
81	June 28	Yankees	4–3	**Gausman** (1–3)	Sabathia (8–6)	**Hunter** (2)	**Camden Yards**	40,041	45–36	W2
82	June 29	Yankees	11–3	**Britton** (2–2)	Phelps (5–5)		**Camden Yards**	46,607	46–36	W3
83	June 30	Yankees	4–2	**Tillman** (10–2)	Kuroda (7–6)	**J. Johnson** (28)	**Camden Yards**	40,878	47–36	W4

July (12–13) – home (6–6) – road (6–7)

#	Date	Opponent	Score	Win	Loss	Save	Stadium	Attendance	Record	Box/ Streak
84	July 2	@ White Sox	2–5	Danks (2–5)	**Hammel** (7–5)	Reed (22)	U.S. Cellular Field	19,746	47–37	L1
85	July 3	@ White Sox	4–2	**O'Day** (4–0)	Lindstrom (2–3)	**J. Johnson** (29)	U.S. Cellular Field	26,001	48–37	W1
86	July 4	@ White Sox	2–3	Reed (4–1)	**Hunter** (3–2)		U.S. Cellular Field	21,321	48–38	L1
87	July 5	@ Yankees	2–3	Nova (3–2)	**J. Johnson** (2–7)		Yankee Stadium	43,396	48–39	L2
88	July 6	@ Yankees	4–5	Pettitte (6–6)	**Tillman** (10–3)	Rivera (29)	Yankee Stadium	42,678	48–40	L3
89	July 7	@ Yankees	2–1	**O'Day** (5–0)	Rivera (1–2)	**J. Johnson** (30)	Yankee Stadium	40,218	49–40	W1
90	July 8	Rangers	5–8	Holland (7–4)	**Feldman** (7–7)	Nathan (30)	**Camden Yards**	24,619	49–41	L1
91	July 9	Rangers	4–8	Pérez (3–1)	**Britton** (2–3)		**Camden Yards**	29,160	49–42	L2
92	July 10	Rangers	6–1	**Chen** (4–3)	Lindblom (1–3)		**Camden Yards**	19,344	50–42	W1
93	July 11	Rangers	3–1	**González** (7–3)	Wolf (1–2)	**J. Johnson** (31)	**Camden Yards**	21,857	51–42	W2
94	July 12	Blue Jays	8–5	**Tillman** (11–3)	Buehrle (5–6)	**J. Johnson** (32)	**Camden Yards**	42,660	52–42	W3
95	July 13	Blue Jays	3–7	Loup (4–3)	**Hammel** (7–6)	Janssen (18)	**Camden Yards**	46,150	52–43	L1
96	July 14	Blue Jays	7–4	**Feldman** (8–7)	Johnson (1–5)	**J. Johnson** (33)	**Camden Yards**	34,748	53–43	W1
ASG	July 16	All-Star Game	AL 3–0 NL	Sale	Corbin	Nathan	Citi Field, Flushing, New York City, NY			
97	July 19	@ Rangers	3–1	**Chen** (5–3)	Holland (8–5)	**J. Johnson** (34)	Rangers Ballpark in Arlington	40,068	54–43	W2
98	July 20	@ Rangers	7–4	**González** (8–3)	Wolf (1–3)	**J. Johnson** (35)	Rangers Ballpark in Arlington	41,660	55–43	W3
99	July 21	@ Rangers	4–2	**Tillman** (12–3)	Perez (3–3)	**O'Day** (2)	Rangers Ballpark in Arlington	39,907	56–43	W4
100	July 22	@ Royals	9–2	**Feldman** (9–7)	Davis (4–9)		Kauffman Stadium	16,362	57–43	W5
101	July 23	@ Royals	2–3	Chen (4–0)	**Hammel** (7–7)	Holland (25)	Kauffman Stadium	19,072	57–44	L1
102	July 24	@ Royals	3–4	Hochevar (3–1)	**O'Day** (5–1)		Kauffman Stadium	17,410	57–45	L2
103	July 25	@ Royals	1–7	Guthrie (10–7)	**González** (8–4)		Kauffman Stadium	17,675	57–46	L3
104	July 26	Red Sox	6–0	**Tillman** (13–3)	Lackey (7–8)		**Camden Yards**	39,063	58–46	W1
105	July 27	Red Sox	3–7	Dempster (6–8)	**Feldman** (9–8)		**Camden Yards**	44,765	58–47	L1
106	July 28	Red Sox	0–5	Lester (10–6)	**Hammel** (7–8)		**Camden Yards**	32,891	58–48	L2
107	July 30	Astros	4–3	**Chen** (6–3)	Harrell (5–11)	**J. Johnson** (36)	**Camden Yards**	24,904	59–48	W1
108	July 31	Astros	0–11	Oberholtzer (1–0)	**González** (8–5)		**Camden Yards**	25,265	59–49	L1

August (12–14) – home (7–6) – road (5–8)

#	Date	Opponent	Score	Win	Loss	Save	Stadium	Attendance	Record	Box/ Streak
109	August 1	Astros	6–3	**Norris** (7–9)	Lyles (4–5)	**J. Johnson** (37)	**Camden Yards**	17,909	60–49	W1
110	August 2	Mariners	11–8	**Tillman** (14–3)	Harang (5–10)	**J. Johnson** (38)	**Camden Yards**	25,947	61–49	W2
111	August 3	Mariners	4–8	Ramírez (3–0)	**Feldman** (9–9)	Farquhar (1)	**Camden Yards**	35,231	61–50	L1
112	August 4	Mariners	2–3	Saunders (10–10)	**Chen** (6–4)	Farquhar (2)	**Camden Yards**	30,759	61–51	L2
113	August 6	@ Padres	4–1	**Norris** (8–9)	Vólquez (8–9)	**J. Johnson** (39)	Petco Park	28,055	62–51	W1
114	August 7	@ Padres	10–3	**Rodríguez** (2–1)	Gregerson (5–6)		Petco Park	21,206	63–51	W2
115	August 9	@ Giants	5–2 (10)	**J. Johnson** (3–7)	López (1–2)	**Hunter** (3)	AT&T Park	41,434	64–51	W3
116	August 10	@ Giants	2–3	Moscoso (1–0)	**Chen** (6–5)	Romo (28)	AT&T Park	41,315	64–52	L1
117	August 11	@ Giants	10–2	**Patton** (2–0)	Cain (7–8)		AT&T Park	41,622	65–52	W1
118	August 12	@ Diamondbacks	6–7	Ziegler (6–1)	**O'Day** (5–2)		Chase Field	18,889	65–53	L1
119	August 13	@ Diamondbacks	3–4 (11)	Bell (3–1)	**McFarland** (1–1)		Chase Field	20,036	65–54	L2
120	August 14	@ Diamondbacks	4–5 (14)	Bell (4–1)	**Norris** (8–10)		Chase Field	19,568	65–55	L3
121	August 16	Rockies	3–6	Nicasio (7–6)	**Chen** (6–6)		**Camden Yards**	31,438	65–56	L4
122	August 17	Rockies	8–4	**Norris** (9–10)	Bettis (0–2)		**Camden Yards**	31,089	66–56	W1
123	August 18	Rockies	7–2	**Feldman** (10–9)	Chacín (11–7)		**Camden Yards**	22,238	67–56	W2
124	August 19	Rays	3–4	Price (7–5)	**Tillman** (14–4)	Rodney (28)	**Camden Yards**	25,044	67–57	L1
125	August 20	Rays	4–7	Cobb (8–2)	**González** (8–6)	Rodney (29)	**Camden Yards**	26,158	67–58	L2
126	August 21	Rays	4–2	**Chen** (7–6)	Hellickson (10–7)	**Hunter** (4)	**Camden Yards**	28,323	68–58	W1
127	August 23	Athletics	9–7	**Rodríguez** (3–1)	Cook (5–3)	**J. Johnson** (40)	**Camden Yards**	36,761	69–58	W2
128	August 24	Athletics	1–2	Parker (10–8)	**O'Day** (5–3)	Balfour (32)	**Camden Yards**	33,834	69–59	L1
129	August 25	Athletics	10–3	**Feldman** (11–9)	Gray (1–2)		**Camden Yards**	33,820	70–59	W1
130	August 27	@ Red Sox	2–13	Doubront (10–6)	**Chen** (7–7)		Fenway Park	36,226	70–60	L1
131	August 28	@ Red Sox	3–4	Breslow (4–2)	**Hunter** (3–3)	Uehara (14)	Fenway Park	31,962	70–61	L2
132	August 29	@ Red Sox	3–2	**Tillman** (15–4)	Lester (12–8)	**J. Johnson** (41)	Fenway Park	33,300	71–61	W1
133	August 30	@ Yankees	5–8	Sabathia (12–11)	**González** (8–7)	Rivera (39)	Yankee Stadium	45,169	71–62	L1
134	August 31	@ Yankees	0–2	Nova (8–4)	**Feldman** (11–10)		Yankee Stadium	42,836	71–63	L2

September (14–14) – home (8–6) – road (6–8)

#	Date	Opponent	Score	Win	Loss	Save	Stadium	Attendance	Record	Box/ Streak
135	September 1	@ Yankees	7–3	**Gausman** (2–3)	Kelley (4–2)		Yankee Stadium	40,361	72–63	W1
136	September 2	@ Indians	7–2	**Norris** (10–10)	Masterson (14–10)		Progressive Field	15,020	73–63	W2
137	September 3	@ Indians	3–4	Jiménez (10–9)	**Tillman** (15–5)		Progressive Field	9,962	73–64	L1
138	September 4	@ Indians	4–6	Shaw (3–3)	**Gausman** (2–4)	Perez (22)	Progressive Field	11,522	73–65	L2
139	September 5	White Sox	3–1	**González** (9–7)	Quintana (7–6)	**J. Johnson** (42)	**Camden Yards**	17,383	74–65	W1
140	September 6	White Sox	4–0	**Feldman** (12–10)	Danks (4–12)		**Camden Yards**	26,253	75–65	W2
141	September 7	White Sox	4–3 (10)	**Hunter** (4–3)	Reed (5–3)		**Camden Yards**	23,653	76–65	W3
142	September 8	White Sox	2–4	Rienzo (2–1)	**Norris** (10–11)	Reed (37)	**Camden Yards**	32,042	76–66	L1
143	September 9	Yankees	4–2	**Tillman** (16–5)	Sabathia (13–12)	**J. Johnson** (43)	**Camden Yards**	17,456	77–66	W1
144	September 10	Yankees	5–7	Warren (2–2)	**Gausman** (2–5)	Rivera (42)	**Camden Yards**	25,697	77–67	L1
145	September 11	Yankees	4–5	Robertson (5–1)	**Hunter (4–4)**	Rivera (43)	**Camden Yards**	20,141	77–68	L2
146	September 12	Yankees	5–6	Rivera (6–2)	**J. Johnson** (3–8)		**Camden Yards**	24,659	77–69	L3
147	September 13	@ Blue Jays	5–3	**Hunter** (5–4)	Delabar (5–4)	**J. Johnson** (44)	Rogers Centre	20,024	78–69	W1
148	September 14	@ Blue Jays	3–4	Jeffress (1–0)	**Tillman** (16–6)	Janssen (30)	Rogers Centre	29,942	78–70	L1
149	September 15	@ Blue Jays	3–1	**González** (10–7)	Buehrle (11–9)	**J. Johnson** (45)	Rogers Centre	22,331	79–70	W1
150	September 17	@ Red Sox	3–2	**Hunter** (6–4)	Uehara (4–1)	**J. Johnson** (46)	Fenway Park	35,030	80–70	W2
151	September 18	@ Red Sox	5–3 (12)	**McFarland** (2–1)	Morales (2–2)	**J. Johnson** (47)	Fenway Park	38,540	81–70	W3
152	September 19	@ Red Sox	1–3	Lackey (10–12)	**Tillman** (16–7)		Fenway Park	36,436	81–71	L1
153	September 20	@ Rays	4–5 (18)	Hellickson (12–9)	**Norris** (10–12)		Tropicana Field	21,247	81–72	L2
154	September 21	@ Rays	1–5	Cobb (10–3)	**González** (10–8)		Tropicana Field	23,835	81–73	L3
155	September 22	@ Rays	1–3	Gomes (3–1)	**Feldman** (12–11)	Rodney (36)	Tropicana Field	28,974	81–74	L4
156	September 23	@ Rays	4–5	Peralta (3–8)	**Hunter** (6–5)		Tropicana Field	17,830	81–75	L5
157	September 24	Blue Jays	2–3 (10)	Santos (1–1)	**Rodríguez** (3–2)	Janssen (34)	**Camden Yards**	16,772	81–76	L6
158	September 25	Blue Jays	9–5	**McFarland** (3–1)	Rogers (5–9)	**Hammel** (1)	**Camden Yards**	23,698	82–76	W1
159	September 26	Blue Jays	3–2	**González** (11–8)	Buehrle (12–10)	**J. Johnson** (48)	**Camden Yards**	27,498	83–76	W2
160	September 27	Red Sox	3–12	Buchholz (12–1)	**Feldman** (12–12)		**Camden Yards**	30,774	83–77	L1
161	September 28	Red Sox	6–5	**Gausman** (3–5)	Tazawa (5–4)	**J. Johnson** (49)	**Camden Yards**	36,556	84–77	W1
162	September 29	Red Sox	7–6	**McFarland** (4–1)	De La Rosa (0–2)	**J. Johnson** (50)	**Camden Yards**	44,230	85–77	W2

== Season standings ==
=== American League East ===
AL East
Team	W	L	Pct.	GB	Home	Road
Boston Red Sox	97	65	.599	—	53‍–‍28	44‍–‍37
Tampa Bay Rays	92	71	.564	5½	51‍–‍30	41‍–‍41
New York Yankees	85	77	.525	12	46‍–‍35	39‍–‍42
Baltimore Orioles	85	77	.525	12	46‍–‍35	39‍–‍42
Toronto Blue Jays	74	88	.457	23	40‍–‍41	34‍–‍47

=== American League Wild Card ===
Division winners
Team	W	L	Pct.
Boston Red Sox	97	65	.599
Oakland Athletics	96	66	.593
Detroit Tigers	93	69	.574

Wild Card teams (Top 2 teams qualify for postseason)
Team	W	L	Pct.	GB
Cleveland Indians	92	70	.568	+½
Tampa Bay Rays	92	71	.564	—
Texas Rangers	91	72	.558	1
Kansas City Royals	86	76	.531	5½
New York Yankees	85	77	.525	6½
Baltimore Orioles	85	77	.525	6½
Los Angeles Angels of Anaheim	78	84	.481	13½
Toronto Blue Jays	74	88	.457	17½
Seattle Mariners	71	91	.438	20½
Minnesota Twins	66	96	.407	25½
Chicago White Sox	63	99	.389	28½
Houston Astros	51	111	.315	40½

=== Record vs. opponents ===
2013 American League record Source: MLB Standings Grid – 2013
Team	BAL	BOS	CWS	CLE	DET	HOU	KC	LAA	MIN	NYY	OAK	SEA	TB	TEX	TOR	NL
Baltimore	—	11–8	4–3	3–4	4–2	4–2	3–4	5–2	3–3	9–10	5–2	2–4	6–13	5–2	10–9	11–9
Boston	8–11	—	4–2	6–1	3–4	6–1	2–5	3–3	4–3	13–6	3–3	6–1	12–7	2–4	11–8	14–6
Chicago	3–4	2–4	—	2–17	7–12	3–4	9–10	3–4	8–11	3–3	2–5	3–3	2–5	4–2	4–3	8–12
Cleveland	4–3	1–6	17–2	—	4–15	6–1	10–9	4–2	13–6	1–6	5–2	5–2	2–4	5–1	4–2	11–9
Detroit	2–4	4–3	12–7	15–4	—	6–1	9–10	0–6	11–8	3–3	3–4	5–2	3–3	3–4	5–2	12–8
Houston	2–4	1–6	4–3	1–6	1–6	—	2–4	10–9	1–5	1–5	4–15	9–10	2–5	2–17	3–4	8–12
Kansas City	4–3	5–2	10–9	9–10	10–9	4–2	—	2–5	15–4	2–5	1–5	4–3	6–1	3–3	2–4	9–11
Los Angeles	2–5	3–3	4–3	2–4	6–0	9–10	5–2	—	1–5	3–4	8–11	11–8	4–3	4–15	6–1	10–10
Minnesota	3–3	3–4	11–8	6–13	8–11	5–1	4–15	5–1	—	2–5	1–6	4–3	1–6	4–3	1–5	8–12
New York	10–9	6–13	3–3	6–1	3–3	5–1	5–2	4–3	5–2	—	1–5	4–3	7–12	3–4	14–5	9–11
Oakland	2–5	3–3	5–2	2–5	4–3	15–4	5–1	11–8	6–1	5–1	—	8–11	3–3	10–9	4–3	13–7
Seattle	4–2	1–6	3–3	2–5	2–5	10–9	3–4	8–11	3–4	3–4	11–8	—	3–3	7–12	3–3	8–12
Tampa Bay	13–6	7–12	5–2	4–2	3–3	5–2	1–6	3–4	6–1	12–7	3–3	3–3	—	4–4	11–8	12–8
Texas	2–5	4–2	2–4	1–5	4–3	17–2	3–3	15–4	3–4	4–3	9–10	12–7	4–4	—	1–6	10–10
Toronto	9–10	8–11	3–4	2–4	2–5	4–3	4–2	1–6	5–1	5–14	3–4	3–3	8–11	6–1	—	11–9

=== Detailed records ===
American League
Opponent	Home	Away	Total	Pct.	Runs scored	Runs allowed
AL East
Baltimore Orioles	–	–	–	–	–	–
Boston Red Sox	6–4	5–4	11–8	.579	71	84
New York Yankees	6–4	3–6	9–10	.474	77	72
Tampa Bay Rays	3–6	3–7	6–13	.316	86	104
Toronto Blue Jays	6–3	4–6	10–9	.526	94	97
	21–17	15–23	36–40	.474	328	357
AL Central
Chicago White Sox	3–1	1–2	4–3	.571	21	18
Cleveland Indians	2–2	1–2	3–4	.429	32	27
Detroit Tigers	2–1	2–1	4–2	.667	33	27
Kansas City Royals	2–1	1–3	3–4	.429	26	28
Minnesota Twins	1–2	2–1	3–3	.500	37	29
	10–7	7–9	17–16	.515	149	129
AL West
Houston Astros	2–1	2–1	4–2	.667	24	30
Los Angeles Angels	2–1	3–1	5–2	.714	30	27
Oakland Athletics	2–1	3–1	5–2	.714	48	26
Seattle Mariners	1–2	1–2	2–4	.333	29	35
Texas Rangers	2–2	3–0	5–2	.714	32	25
	9–7	12–5	21–12	.636	163	143

National League
Opponent	Home	Away	Total	Pct.	Runs scored	Runs allowed
Arizona Diamondbacks	0–0	0–3	0–3	.000	13	16
Colorado Rockies	2–1	0–0	2–1	.667	18	12
Los Angeles Dodgers	2–1	0–0	2–1	.667	17	13
San Diego Padres	0–2	2–0	2–2	.500	20	15
San Francisco Giants	0–0	2–1	2–1	.667	17	7
Washington Nationals	2–0	1–1	3–1	.750	20	17
	6–4	5–5	11–9	.550	105	80

== Farm system ==
Level	Team	League	Manager
AAA	Norfolk Tides	International League	Ron Johnson
AA	Bowie Baysox	Eastern League	Gary Kendall
A	Frederick Keys	Carolina League	Ryan Minor
A	Delmarva Shorebirds	South Atlantic League	Luis Pujols
A-Short Season	Aberdeen IronBirds	New York–Penn League	Matt Merullo
Rookie	GCL Orioles	Gulf Coast League	Orlando Gómez
