= Eric Fryer (baseball) =

American baseball player (born 1985)

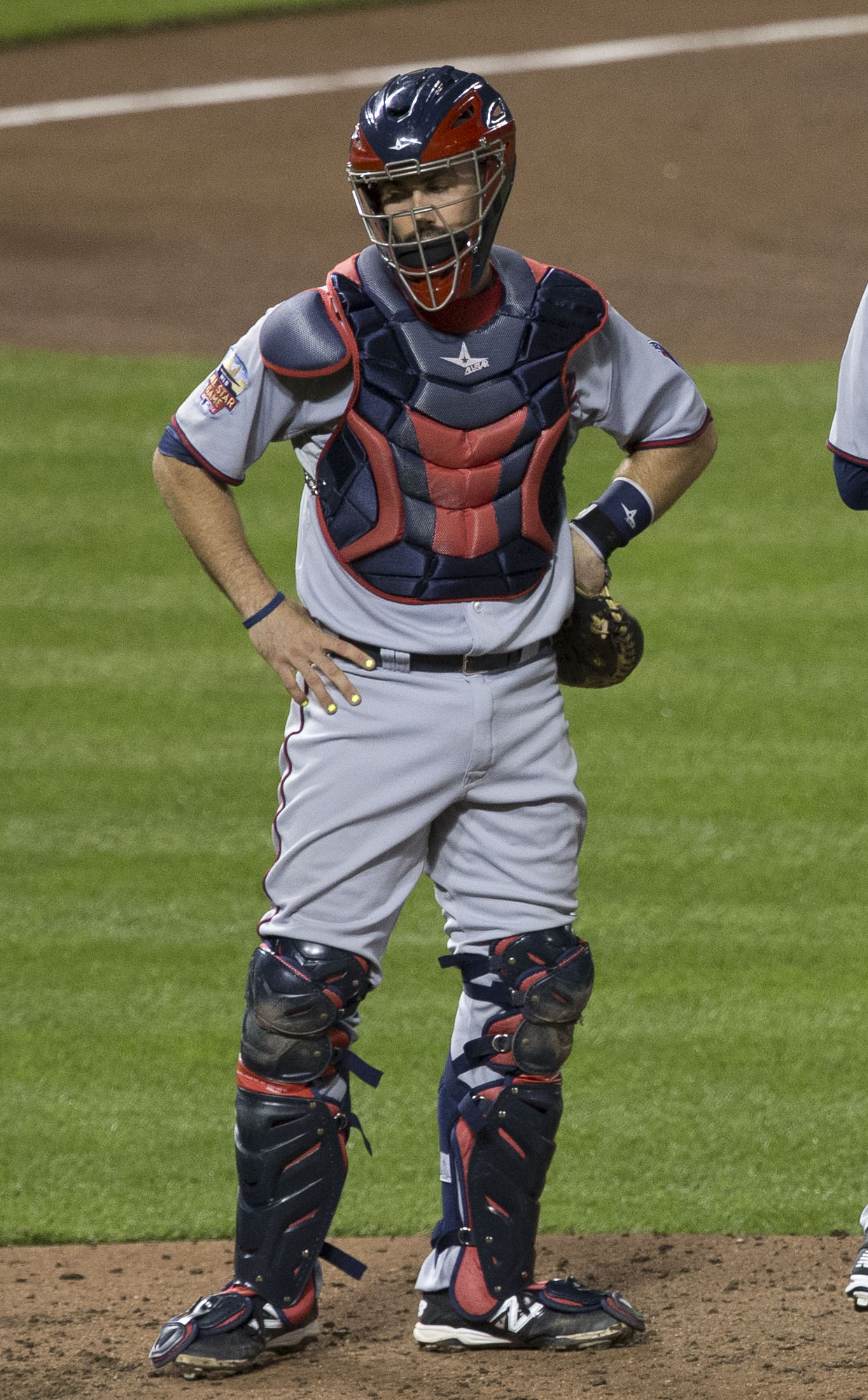
- Fryer with the Minnesota Twins
- Catcher
- Born: August 26, 1985 (age 41); Columbus, Ohio, U.S.
- Batted: Right Threw: Right

MLB debut
- June 26, 2011, for the Pittsburgh Pirates

Last MLB appearance
- July 20, 2017, for the St. Louis Cardinals

MLB statistics
- Batting average: .232
- Home runs: 2
- Runs batted in: 27
- Stats at Baseball Reference

Teams
- Pittsburgh Pirates (2011–2012); Minnesota Twins (2013–2015); St. Louis Cardinals (2016); Pittsburgh Pirates (2016); St. Louis Cardinals (2017)
Medals
Men's baseball
Representing United States
Pan American Games
Silver medal – second place	2015 Toronto	Team

Eric Joseph Fryer (born August 26, 1985) is an American former professional baseball catcher. He played in Major League Baseball (MLB) for the Pittsburgh Pirates, Minnesota Twins, and St. Louis Cardinals. A product of Ohio State University, the Milwaukee Brewers selected him in the ninth round of the 2007 Major League Baseball draft.

== Amateur career ==
Fryer attended Reynoldsburg High School, where he excelled as a catcher and pitcher, going 8-2 on the mound with a 1.35 ERA and 93 strikeouts in 60 innings pitched, and batting a school record .544 with 7 homeruns and 50 RBI, along with 26 stolen bases his senior year, earning league and district player of the year honors. He received first-team All-State honors twice, and led the team to district titles in 2003 and 2004; falling one game short of the Division 1 state championship in 2004.

He played college baseball at Ohio State. In 2006, he played collegiate summer baseball with the Harwich Mariners of the Cape Cod Baseball League. During his junior season at Ohio State, Fryer batted .322. In his three seasons at Ohio State, Fryer held a batting average of .338 with ten home runs and 126 RBIs in 172 games, earning All Big Ten honors twice. Fryer graduated from Ohio State in his first minor league offseason with magna cum laude honors.

== Professional career ==
=== Milwaukee Brewers ===
Fryer was drafted by the Milwaukee Brewers as a catcher and left fielder in the tenth round of the 2007 Major League Baseball draft out of Ohio State. Fryer started his professional career with the Helena Brewers in 2007. Fryer spent the 2008 season with the West Virginia Power where he won the South Atlantic League batting title and was voted into the leagues All-Star game. He batted .335 with 10 home runs and 70 RBI on the year.

=== New York Yankees ===
On February 4, 2009, Fryer was traded to the New York Yankees in exchange for Chase Wright. Fryer played 59 games for the Tampa Yankees, hitting .300 with 15 stolen bases.

=== Pittsburgh Pirates ===
Fryer, along with Casey Erickson, was traded to the Pittsburgh Pirates in exchange for Eric Hinske on June 29, 2009.

On June 25, 2011, Fryer was promoted to the major leagues for the first time. Fryer got his first major league hit on July 2, off Washington Nationals pitcher John Lannan. Fryer was designated for assignment on November 18. Fryer was promoted to the Pirates on June 26, 2012, then was optioned back to the minors on July 7, before being recalled again on September 1 and designated for assignment on October 25. He elected free agency on October 29. In 16 games with the Pirates over 2 seasons, Fryer went 8-for-30 with five runs and one stolen base.

=== Minnesota Twins ===
On November 10, 2012, Fryer signed a minor league contract with the Minnesota Twins that included an invitation to spring training. He spent the season with the Triple-A Rochester Red Wings. His contract was selected by the Twins on September 9, after Rochester was eliminated from the International League playoffs. He hit his first major-league home run off Tommy Milone of the Oakland Athletics, a 424-foot solo shot to center in a game the Twins lost 18–3. While up with the Twins for 6 games he hit .385 (5-for-13).

He was competing for the back-up catcher role along with Chris Herrmann and Josmil Pinto in 2014. He went 3–for–11 with 3 RBI in 7 games in Spring Training, however that position was eventually given to Pinto. Fryer began 2014 once again with Rochester. He was outrighted to Triple–A on December 23, 2014.

Fryer was recalled from Triple–A Rochester on July 8, 2015, after hitting over .300 on the year and being selected for Team USA to play in the Pan American Games.

=== St. Louis Cardinals ===
The St. Louis Cardinals signed Fryer on November 12, 2015, to a minor league contract with an invitation to spring training as a non-roster player. On March 31, 2016, the club assigned him to Triple-A Memphis. However, due to an injury to backup catcher Brayan Peña, he made the major league Opening Day roster as the backup to Yadier Molina. Fryer's first hit and RBI came in his first plate appearance of the season on April 9 against the Atlanta Braves. He made his first start on April 17 at Busch Stadium against the Cincinnati Reds. He reached base in all four plate appearances, including three hits in three at bats and first walk of the season, to extend a streak of seven consecutive plate appearances reaching base to open the season. He collected his first two doubles, including driving in Aledmys Díaz for the decisive run in a 4–3 win.

Upon Peña's reinstatement from the DL on June 28, 2016, St. Louis designated Fryer for assignment. He appeared in 24 games with the Cardinals, batting .368 (14 hits in 38 at bats) with five RBI.

=== Pittsburgh Pirates (second stint) ===
The Pittsburgh Pirates, playing the Cardinals at Busch Stadium on July 3, 2016, claimed Fryer off waivers, and he switched dugouts to return to his former club. Fryer went 2-for-4 with a double and three RBI against the Cardinals on July 5. In 36 total appearances for the Pirates, he batted .218/.300/.269 with no home runs and eight RBI. On December 2, Pittsburgh non-tendered Fryer, making him a free agent.

=== St. Louis Cardinals (second stint) ===
On December 12, 2016, Fryer signed a minor league contract with the St. Louis Cardinals, that included an invitation to major league spring training. His contract was purchased, and he was added to the 40-man roster on March 29. With the addition of Carson Kelly on July 21, Fryer was designated for assignment, and removed from the 40-man roster by the Cardinals. The Cardinals assigned Fryer outright to the Triple–A Memphis Redbirds on July 24 but he refused the assignment and became a free agent.

On December 18, 2017, Fryer signed a minor league contract with the Philadelphia Phillies. However, on February 12, 2018, Fryer announced that he had decided to retire instead of reporting to camp.
