= John Paul II Collegiate =

Location
- 1491 97th Street; North Battleford, Saskatchewan, S9A 3L2; Canada; 52.7790°N 108.3044°W

Information
- School type: High School
- Motto: "Higher Goals - Further Horizons"
- School board: Light of Christ RCSSD #16
- Principal: Mr. Yockey
- Grades: 8-12
- Enrollment: 662 (2022)
- Language: English, French Immersion
- Website: jp2.loccsd.ca

John Paul II Collegiate is a high school serving grades 8 to 12, located in North Battleford, Saskatchewan. It is one of three high schools in the city. It is part of the Light of Christ Roman Catholic School Division.

John Paul II Collegiate was designed by Folstad & Friggstad Architects of Saskatoon.

John Paul II Collegiate is the only high school in the Battlefords to offer the French Immersion Program. As well, it is the only school to teach Advanced Placement courses.

== Notable alumni ==
- Andrew Albers, former MLB player for the Toronto Blue Jays, Minnesota Twins, and the Seattle Mariners
- Corey Schwab, former NHL goalie for the New Jersey Devils, Tampa Bay Lightning, Vancouver Canucks, and the Toronto Maple Leafs
