= Andrew Albers =

Canadian baseball player (born 1985)

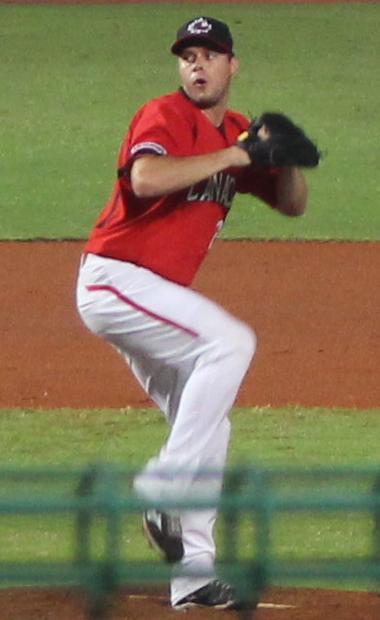
- Albers with the Canadian national team at the 2015 WBSC Premier12
- Pitcher
- Born: Andrew William Albers; October 6, 1985 (age 41); North Battleford, Saskatchewan, Canada
- Batted: Right Threw: Left

Professional debut
- MLB: August 6, 2013, for the Minnesota Twins
- KBO: April 2, 2014, for the Hanwha Eagles
- NPB: April 4, 2018, for the Orix Buffaloes

Last appearance
- MLB: September 15, 2021, for the Minnesota Twins
- KBO: October 17, 2014, for the Hanwha Eagles
- NPB: October 30, 2020, for the Orix Buffaloes

MLB statistics
- Win–loss record: 8–8
- Earned run average: 4.58
- Strikeouts: 91

KBO statistics
- Win–loss record: 6–13
- Earned run average: 5.89
- Strikeouts: 107

NPB statistics
- Win–loss record: 15–16
- Earned run average: 4.02
- Strikeouts: 194
- Stats at Baseball Reference

Teams
- Minnesota Twins (2013); Hanwha Eagles (2014); Toronto Blue Jays (2015); Minnesota Twins (2016); Seattle Mariners (2017); Orix Buffaloes (2018–2020); Minnesota Twins (2021)

Career highlights and awards
- NPB All-Star (2018)
Medals
Men's baseball
Representing Canada
Baseball World Cup
Bronze medal – third place	2011 Panama City	Team
Pan American Games
Gold medal – first place	2011 Guadalajara	Team
Gold medal – first place	2015 Toronto	Team

Andrew William Albers (born October 6, 1985) is a Canadian former professional baseball pitcher. He played in Major League Baseball (MLB) for the Toronto Blue Jays, Minnesota Twins, and Seattle Mariners, as well as in the KBO League for the Hanwha Eagles and in Nippon Professional Baseball (NPB) for the Orix Buffaloes. Prior to beginning his professional career, he played college baseball at the University of Kentucky. Albers has also competed for the Canadian national baseball team.

== Professional career ==
Albers went to high school at John Paul II Collegiate. He was selected by the Milwaukee Brewers in the 12th round (346th overall) of the 2004 Major League Baseball draft, but did not sign. Albers enrolled at the University of Kentucky, where he played college baseball for the Kentucky Wildcats baseball team in the Southeastern Conference of the NCAA Division I. At Kentucky, Albers pitched in 81 games (fifth most in Wildcats history), recording 20 wins (fourth most in Wildcats history), and 12 saves (third most in Wildcats history).

=== San Diego Padres ===
The San Diego Padres selected Albers in the 10th round (315th overall) of the 2008 Major League Baseball draft. After signing with the Padres, Albers made his professional debut with the Arizona League Padres of the Rookie-level Arizona League, making five appearances. Albers missed the 2009 season after tearing an ulnar collateral ligament in his pitching elbow during spring training, which required Tommy John surgery.

=== Quebec Capitales ===
The Padres released Albers, and he pitched for the Québec Capitales of the independent Can-Am Association in 2010. With Québec, Albers had a 3–0 win–loss record, 17 saves and a 1.40 earned run average (ERA).

=== Minnesota Twins ===
Albers tried out for teams in Arizona during spring training in 2011, and drove to Florida to try out for the Minnesota Twins. The Twins signed Albers to a minor league contract, and he pitched for the Fort Myers Miracle of the Class-A Advanced Florida State League and New Britain Rock Cats of the Double-A Eastern League in 2011.

Albers played for the Canadian national baseball team. In 2011, he participated in the 2011 Baseball World Cup, winning the bronze medal, and the Pan American Games, winning the gold medal. Albers pitched 6 2/3 innings in the gold medal game. Along with his teammates, Albers was inducted into the Canadian Baseball Hall of Fame in 2012. Albers was also named Saskatchewan's male athlete of the year.

Albers was called up by the Twins on August 3, 2013, to replace fellow Canadian Scott Diamond, who was optioned to Triple-A. At the time of his call-up, Albers had posted a record of 11–5 and a 2.86 ERA with the Rochester Red Wings, with an International League-leading 116 strikeouts.

On August 6, 2013, Albers made his MLB debut and earned the win, pitching 8 1/3 scoreless innings against the Kansas City Royals and yielding just 4 hits and 1 walk while striking out 2. In his second career start on August 12, Albers threw his first complete game and shutout, defeating the Cleveland Indians 3–0. Albers gave up 2 hits, no walks, and struck out 2 batters. In 2013, Albers posted a 6–13 record with a 5.89 ERA.

=== Hanwha Eagles ===
On January 30, 2014, the Twins released Albers, allowing him to sign with the Hanwha Eagles of the Korea Baseball Organization.

On April 2, 2014, Albers made his KBO debut. The Eagles declined Albers' option for 2015, making him a free agent.

=== Toronto Blue Jays ===
On December 16, 2014, Albers signed a minor-league contract with the Toronto Blue Jays that included an invitation to spring training. He did not make the team, and was assigned to the Buffalo Bisons, their Triple-A affiliate.

In 2015, Albers was the Opening Day starter for Buffalo. Albers had his contract purchased by the Blue Jays on May 1, after Daniel Norris was optioned to Buffalo and Maicer Izturis was moved to the 60-day disabled list. After pitching in one game, he was optioned back to Buffalo on May 2. Albers elected free agency on November 6.

=== Lancaster Barnstormers ===
On March 3, 2016, Albers signed with the Lancaster Barnstormers of the Atlantic League of Professional Baseball.

=== Minnesota Twins (second stint) ===
On April 27, 2016, Albers signed a minor league deal with the Minnesota Twins. On August 11, Albers was brought up to the Twins from the Triple-A Rochester Red Wings. Pitching against the Houston Astros the same day, he made the longest relief appearance of any major league reliever in 2016 by both number of innings pitched (6) and pitches thrown (108). He was optioned back on August 14, and recalled on August 26. He was assigned outright to Rochester on October 17. He elected free agency on October 18.

=== Atlanta Braves ===
In December 2016, Albers signed a minor league contract with the Atlanta Braves. He went 12–3 with a 2.61 ERA and 115 strikeouts for the Triple-A Gwinnett Braves of the International League.

=== Seattle Mariners ===
On August 11, 2017, Albers was traded to the Seattle Mariners in exchange for cash considerations. After pitching well in several starts, he was moved to the bullpen to allow pitchers who had recovered from their injuries rejoin the starting rotation. He logged his first career save on September 25, 2017. On December 18, 2017, the Mariners released Albers to pursue an opportunity in Japan.

=== Orix Buffaloes ===
On December 21, 2017, he signed a one-year, $900,000 contract with the Orix Buffaloes of the Nippon Professional Baseball(NPB).

On April 4, 2018, Albers made his NPB debut. He was selected for the 2018 NPB All-Star game.

On December 20, 2019, Albers signed a 1-year extension to remain with the Buffaloes.

On December 2, 2020, he became a free agent.

=== Minnesota Twins (third stint) ===
On February 8, 2021, Albers signed a minor league contract with the Minnesota Twins, that also included an invitation to Spring Training, marking his third stint with the organization. After posting a 3.86 ERA with 78 strikeouts through 16 appearances with the Triple-A St. Paul Saints, the Twins selected Albers' contract on August 19. That night, Albers made his first Major League appearance in four years in a game against the New York Yankees. Albers made 5 appearances for the Twins, going 1–2 with a 7.58 ERA and 12 strikeouts. Albers was outrighted off of the 40-man roster on October 8. On October 14, Albers elected free agency.

=== Seattle Mariners (second stint) ===
On March 21, 2022, Albers signed a minor league contract with the Seattle Mariners. He elected free agency on October 14.

== International career ==
Albers participated in the 2023 World Baseball Classic.

== Coaching career ==
On September 15, 2023, Albers was hired to serve as the pitching coach for the Saskatoon Berries of the Western Canadian Baseball League.
