= Steve Johnson (baseball) =

American baseball player (born 1987)

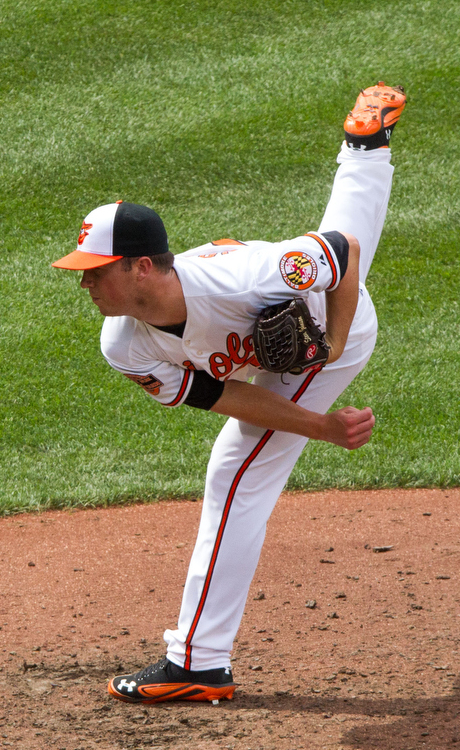
- Johnson with the Baltimore Orioles
- Pitcher
- Born: August 31, 1987 (age 38); Baltimore, Maryland, U.S.
- Batted: Right Threw: Right

MLB debut
- July 15, 2012, for the Baltimore Orioles

Last appearance
- June 14, 2016, for the Seattle Mariners

MLB statistics
- Win–loss record: 6–1
- Earned run average: 4.26
- Strikeouts: 86
- Stats at Baseball Reference

Teams
- Baltimore Orioles (2012–2013, 2015); Seattle Mariners (2016)

Steven David Johnson (born August 31, 1987) is an American former professional baseball pitcher. He made his Major League Baseball (MLB) debut with the Baltimore Orioles in 2012 and also played in MLB for the Seattle Mariners.

== Early life ==
Steve Johnson was born to Dave and Tera Johnson. His father pitched in MLB for five seasons, including three for Baltimore, and is now a broadcaster on MASN, which airs Orioles and Nationals games. Johnson graduated from St. Paul's School in 2005 where he played baseball.

== Professional career ==
=== Los Angeles Dodgers ===
Johnson was drafted by the Los Angeles Dodgers in the 13th round of the 2005 Major League Baseball draft out of St. Paul's School for Boys in Brooklandville, Maryland. He pitched for the Gulf Coast League Dodgers in 2005, going 0–2 with a 9.53 ERA in six games (three starts). He split 2006 between the Ogden Raptors (14 starts) and Jacksonville Suns (two relief appearances), going a combined 5–5 with a 3.67 ERA. In 2007, he went 3–6 with a 4.85 ERA in 18 games (16 starts) for the Great Lakes Loons.

Johnson split 2008 between the Loons (13 starts) and Inland Empire 66ers (11 starts), going a combined 12–8 with a 4.32 ERA. He started the 2009 season in the Dodgers' organization, pitching for the 66ers (18 games, 16 starts) and Chattanooga Lookouts (two starts).

=== Baltimore Orioles ===
On July 30, 2009, Johnson was traded with minor leaguer Josh Bell to the Baltimore Orioles in exchange for George Sherrill. He finished the season with the Double-A Bowie Baysox. Overall, Johnson went a combined 12–7 with a 3.41 ERA in 27 games (25 starts).

The San Francisco Giants selected Johnson in the 2009 Rule 5 draft, but he was returned to the Orioles on March 16, 2010.

Johnson had his contract purchased by the Orioles on June 3, 2012, but was immediately optioned to the Triple-A Norfolk Tides. He was called up to the major leagues for the first time on July 1, for a series against the Seattle Mariners, but did not play in the two games before he was optioned down again. Johnson finally made his major league debut on July 15, against the Detroit Tigers in Baltimore. On August 8, he started and won his first game against the Mariners, 23 years to the day after his father recorded his first victory for the Orioles.

On April 24, 2013, Johnson was sent to Triple-A Norfolk on a rehab assignment. He was brought up to the Orioles on May 11 to start against the Minnesota Twins, and optioned back to Norfolk the next day. He was recalled on May 25 when Pedro Strop was placed on the disabled list.

Johnson did not appear for Baltimore during the 2014 season, recording a 7.11 ERA and 0-2 record across 13 starts in Triple-A. On October 24, 2014, he was removed from the 40-man roster and sent outright to Norfolk. Johnson elected free agency following the season on November 3.

On January 27, 2015, Johnson re-signed with the Orioles organization on a minor league contract that included an invitation to spring training. He was added back to the Orioles' roster on September 1. Johnson made six appearances for Baltimore, but struggled to a 10.14 ERA with three strikeouts across 5 1/3 innings pitched. Johnson was designated for assignment by the Orioles on December 2, following the acquisitions of Mark Trumbo and C. J. Riefenhauser. He was non-tendered and became a free agent the same day.

=== Seattle Mariners ===
On January 29, 2016, Johnson signed a minor league contract with the Texas Rangers, which included an invitation to spring training. He was released by Texas prior to the start of the season on March 14.

On March 17, 2016, Johnson signed a minor league contract with the Seattle Mariners organization. He had his contract selected to the major league roster on May 3, following an injury to Tony Zych. In 16 appearances for Seattle, Johnson compiled a 1-0 record and 4.32 ERA with 17 strikeouts across 16 2/3 innings pitched. Johnson was designated for assignment by the Mariners on June 17. He cleared waivers and was sent outright to Triple-A Tacoma Rainiers on June 19. Johnson elected free agency after the season on October 15.

=== Baltimore Orioles (second stint) ===
On March 4, 2017, Johnson signed a minor league contract with the Baltimore Orioles organization. Johnson made 19 appearances (including five starts) for the Triple-A Norfolk Tides, registering a 1-2 record and 5.30 ERA with 39 strikeouts across 37 1/3 innings pitched.

=== Chicago White Sox ===
On August 9, 2017, the Orioles traded Johnson to the Chicago White Sox for cash considerations. In 5 starts for the Triple–A Charlotte Knights, Johnson struggled to an 8.44 ERA with 21 strikeouts in 21 1/3 innings of work. He elected free agency following the season on November 6.

=== Lancaster Barnstormers ===
On April 2, 2018, Johnson signed with the Lancaster Barnstormers of the Atlantic League of Professional Baseball. Johnson made 11 starts for the Barnstormers, accumulating a 3-5 record and 5.10 ERA with 46 strikeouts across 54 2/3 innings pitched. He announced his retirement as an active player via social media on December 22.

== See also ==
- List of second-generation Major League Baseball players
