= Jared Burton =

American baseball player (born 1981)

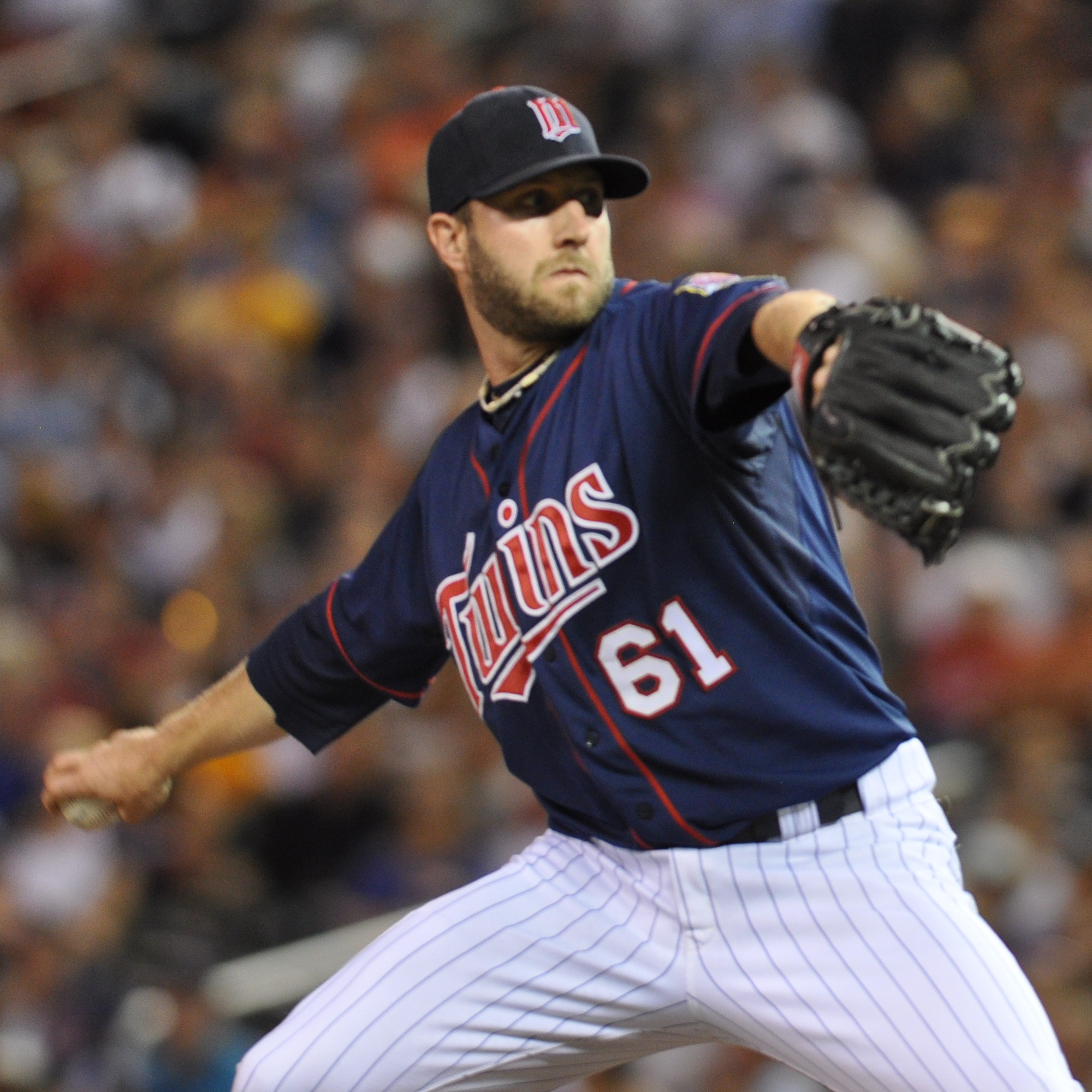
- Burton with the Minnesota Twins
- Pitcher
- Born: June 2, 1981 (age 45); Westminster, South Carolina, U.S.
- Batted: Right Threw: Right

MLB debut
- April 4, 2007, for the Cincinnati Reds

Last MLB appearance
- September 24, 2014, for the Minnesota Twins

MLB statistics
- Win–loss record: 18–19
- Earned run average: 3.44
- Strikeouts: 305
- Stats at Baseball Reference

Teams
- Cincinnati Reds (2007–2011); Minnesota Twins (2012–2014)

Levi Jared Burton (born June 2, 1981) is an American former professional baseball pitcher. He played in Major League Baseball (MLB) for the Cincinnati Reds and Minnesota Twins.

== Early life ==
Burton was born in Westminster, South Carolina. He graduated from West-Oak High School in Westminster. He attended Western Carolina University in Cullowhee, North Carolina.

He was originally selected by the Oakland Athletics in the eighth round of the 2002 Major League Baseball draft. After spending five years in the Athletics minor league system, he became eligible for the 2006 Rule 5 draft. He was selected in the Rule 5 draft by the Cincinnati Reds. Burton has spent three years in Cincinnati which has included 132 appearances and 138 innings pitched as a reliever.

== Professional career ==
=== Oakland Athletics ===
The Oakland Athletics selected Burton out of Western Carolina University in the eighth round of the 2002 Major League Baseball draft. He lost his remaining eligibility at Western Carolina by signing with Oakland on June 12, 2002. The A's sent him to their Single-A affiliate, the Vancouver Canadians. With Vancouver he had a 0–4 win–loss record with a 3.58 earned run average (ERA) in 13 games. He followed up his 2002 season with 15 appearances for the Kane County Cougars in 2003. With Kane County he improved both his win–loss ratio to 2–1 and his ERA to 2.27. The 2004 season was less consistent for Burton, splitting time between two of the Athletics farm teams, the Arizona League Athletics (AZL Athletics) (Rookie League) and the Modesto A's (Single-A). Burton had a 1–0 record and a 4.16 ERA with the AZL Athletics. While in Modesto he had a 3–2 win–loss ratio and a 4.78 ERA. Overall, Burton pitched a combined 53.2 innings in 15 games in 2004. Burton spent the 2005 season with the Stockton Ports, another Oakland Single-A affiliate and went 4–4 with a 2.60 ERA. The 2006 season would turn out to be Burton's final year in Oakland's farm system, and Burton spent it with the Midland RockHounds. With the RockHounds he had a 6–5 record and a 4.14 ERA in a then career high 53 appearances.

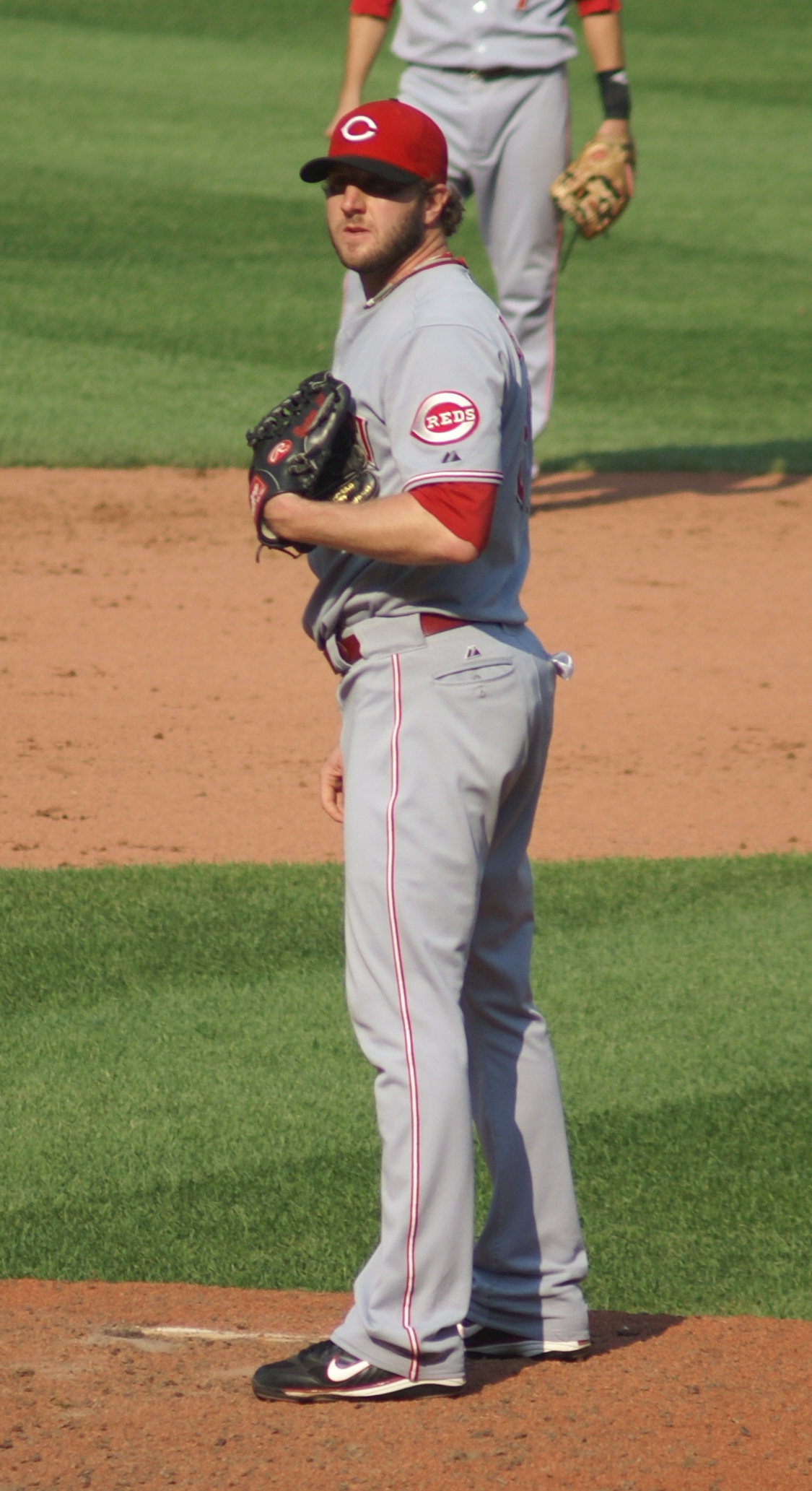
Burton pitching for the Cincinnati Reds in 2008.

=== Cincinnati Reds ===
The Cincinnati Reds selected Burton in the major league portion of the 2006 Rule 5 draft meaning he has to stay on the Reds 25–man active roster all year unless injured or he returns to his previous team. He made his major league debut on April 4, 2007, and pitched in one third of an inning while walking three. On April 8, 2007, Burton was placed on the disabled list after straining a hamstring running in the outfield. Burton was sent to both Triple-A Louisville and Double-A Chattanooga on a rehab assignment and had a combined 1–1 record with a 6.23 ERA. He was taken off the disabled list on May 9, when Eric Milton had an inflamed elbow. Overall, for the season Burton went 4–2 with a 2.51 ERA while making 47 appearances. After putting together a 4–1 record with a 2.23 ERA in 43 games, he strained a muscle in his chest causing him to go on the disabled list on July 19, 2008. Two days earlier it was reported that Burton did not have to go on the disabled list, but he was bothered by it in a bullpen session the day before he was due back. On August 4, he suffered another setback while throwing in a bullpen session, when he felt tenderness in the muscle. Finally, on August 15, Burton threw a pain free bullpen session and followed that up with another painfree simulated game on August 22. On August 28, Burton was sent to Louisville for a rehab assignment. The Reds activated Burton from the disabled list on September 2, 2009 after he had a 4.50 ERA in two games for Louisville. Despite missing almost a month and a half due to injury, Burton pitched in a career high 54 games and posted a 5–1 record with a 3.22 ERA.

Burton began the 2011 season on the DL and was shut down from throwing due to shoulder inflammation on April 9.

On October 31, 2011, Burton was outrighted to the Louisville Bats. He declared free agency on November 1.

=== Minnesota Twins ===
On November 12, 2011, Burton signed a minor league contract with the Minnesota Twins. After an impressive spring training and some complications for fellow Twins pitchers Scott Baker and Jason Marquis, Burton made the 2012 Opening Day roster. In his first season with the Twins, Burton appeared in 64 games, going 3–2 with a 2.18 ERA and 55 strikeouts.

In 2013, Burton's ERA grew higher, as it finished at 3.82 and his record was 2–9 in a career high 71 games. He became a free agent following the season.

=== New York Yankees ===
On February 16, 2015, Burton signed a minor league contract with the New York Yankees and was invited to spring training. He didn't get to pitch in the Bronx, as he was released prior to the start of the season on March 26. On March 29, Burton was re-signed by the Yankees to a minor league contract. After appearing in 4 games for the Triple-A Scranton/Wilkes-Barre RailRiders, Burton was released on May 16.

=== Texas Rangers ===
On May 24, 2015, Burton signed a minor league contract with the Texas Rangers. In 12 appearances for the Triple-A Round Rock Express, he recorded an 0.90 ERA with 11 strikeouts across 10 innings pitched. Burton requested and was granted his release from the Rangers organization on June 30.

On January 22, 2016, while still a free agent, Burton was suspended 50 games for a second positive test for a drug of abuse. On December 10, Burton expressed interest in a comeback.
