= Josmil Pinto =

Venezuelan baseball player (born 1989)

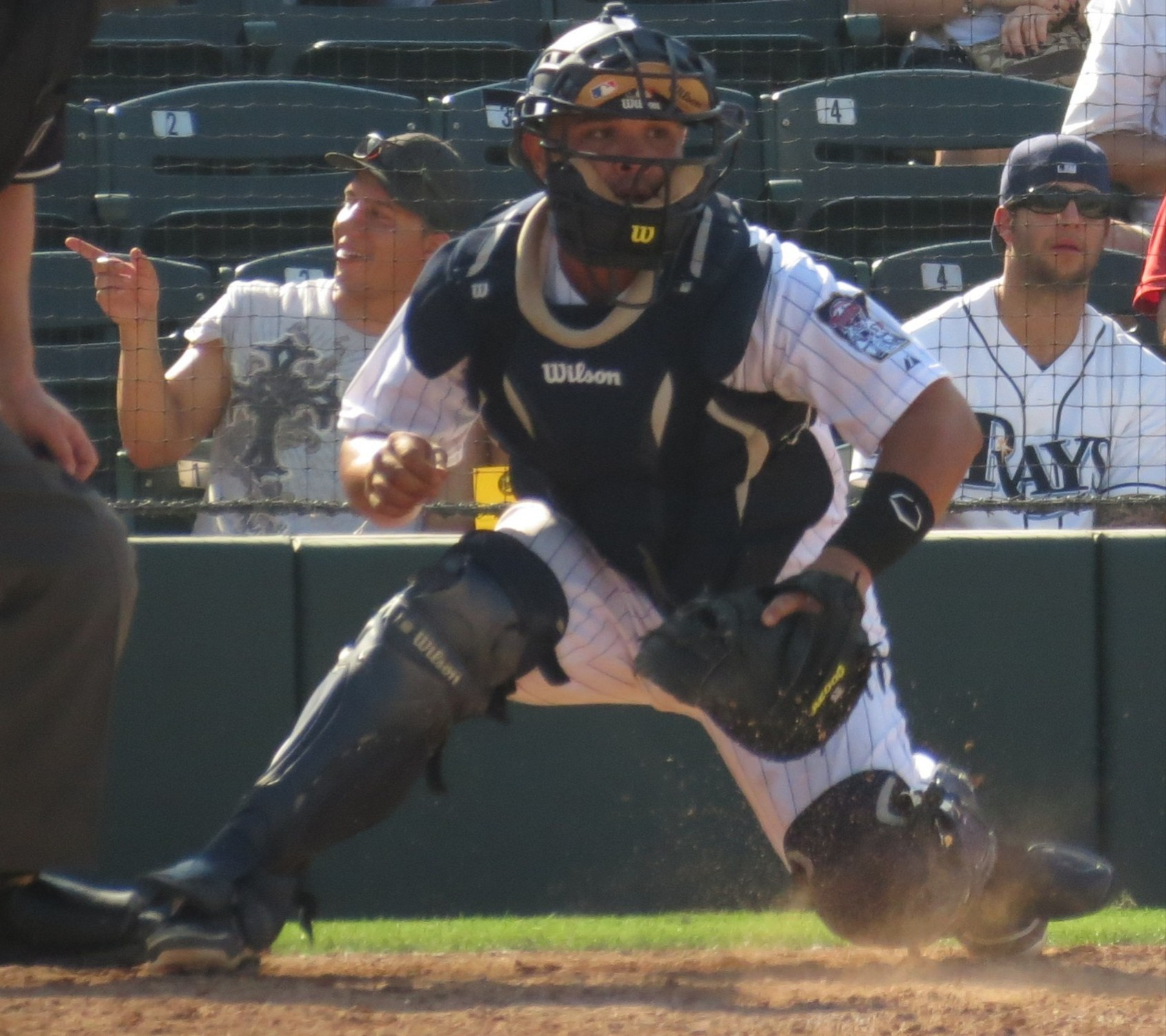
- Pinto playing for the Minnesota Twins in 2013
- Catcher / Designated hitter
- Born: March 31, 1989 (age 36); Valencia, Carabobo, Venezuela
- Batted: Right Threw: Right

MLB debut
- September 1, 2013, for the Minnesota Twins

Last MLB appearance
- October 2, 2016, for the Milwaukee Brewers

MLB statistics
- Batting average: .252
- Home runs: 11
- Runs batted in: 30
- Stats at Baseball Reference

Teams
- Minnesota Twins (2013–2014); Milwaukee Brewers (2016)

Josmil Oswaldo Pinto (born March 31, 1989) is a Venezuelan former professional baseball catcher. He played in Major League Baseball (MLB) for the Minnesota Twins and Milwaukee Brewers.

== Career ==
=== Minnesota Twins ===
Pinto signed as an international free agent with the Minnesota Twins in 2006. On November 20, 2012, the Twins added Pinto to their 40-man roster in order to protect him from the Rule 5 draft. Beginning the 2013 season with the New Britain Rock Cats of the Double–A Eastern League, Pinto was named an Eastern League All-Star. He was promoted to the Rochester Red Wings of the Triple–A International League in August. Pinto had a combined .309 batting average, .400 on-base percentage, and .482 slugging percentage with 15 home runs and 74 runs batted in (RBIs) in 126 games for New Britain and Rochester.

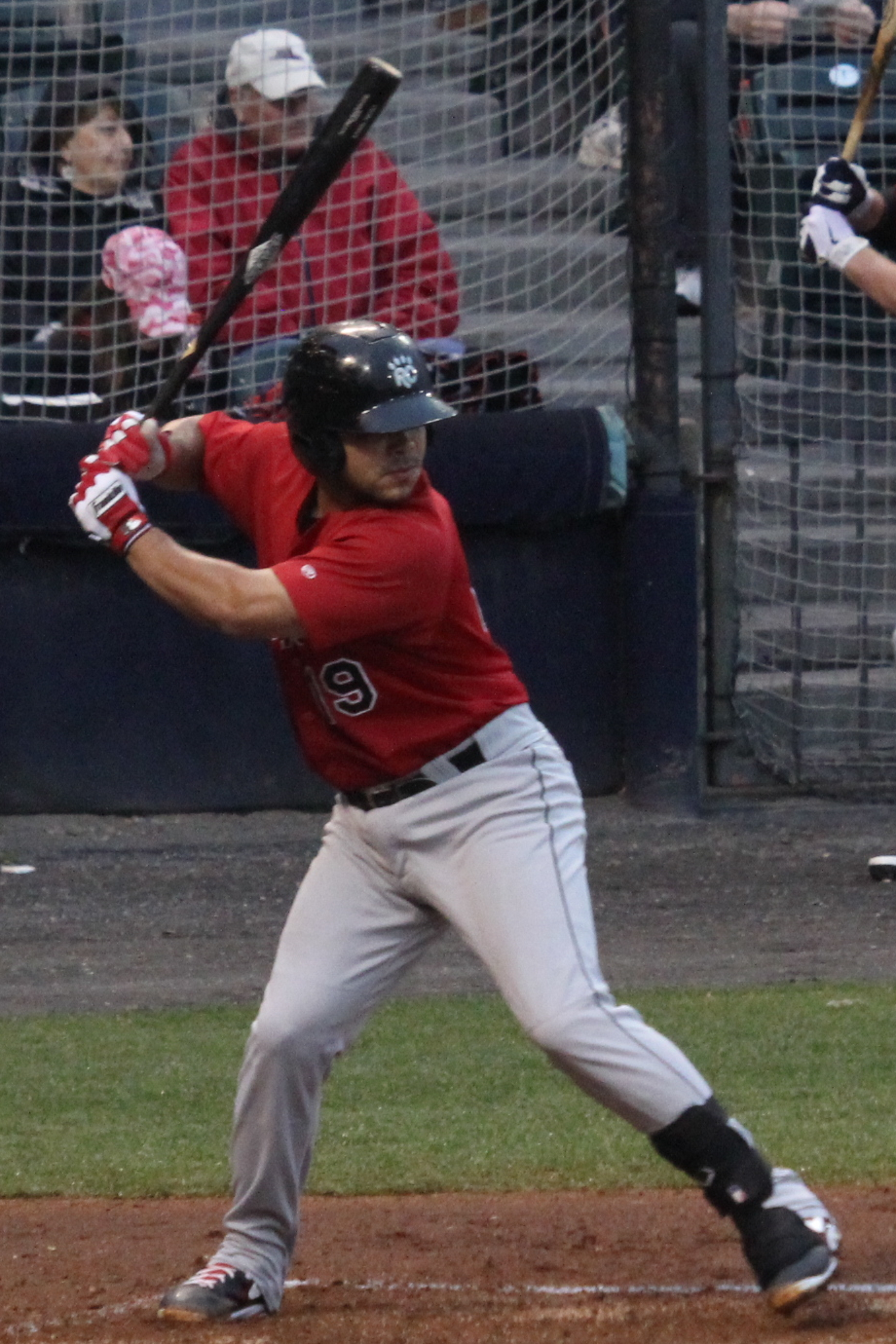
Pinto batting for the New Britain Rock Cats in 2013

On August 31, the Twins promoted Pinto to the major leagues. In 21 games for the Twins, Pinto had a .342 batting average, .398 on-base percentage, and a .566 slugging percentage. He hit four home runs, five doubles, and recorded 12 RBIs.

During spring training in 2014, the Twins named Pinto to their Opening Day roster as the backup to Kurt Suzuki. He spent a lot of time as the designated hitter due to the absence of Josh Willingham from the lineup. He was hitting just .246 with 5 HR and 9 RBI through April, and those struggles continued into May, contributing to less playing time. Pinto was eventually optioned to Rochester on June 12. In 43 games to that point, he was hitting .222 with 7 HR, 16 RBI and a .730 OPS. He also allowed all 20 runners who attempted to steal a base on him to do so due to poor arm strength and lazy catching skills.

=== Milwaukee Brewers ===
On November 20, 2015, the San Diego Padres claimed Pinto off of waivers. He was designated for assignment on December 21. Pinto was then claimed off waivers by the Milwaukee Brewers on December 23. The Brewers designated him for assignment on January 6, 2016.

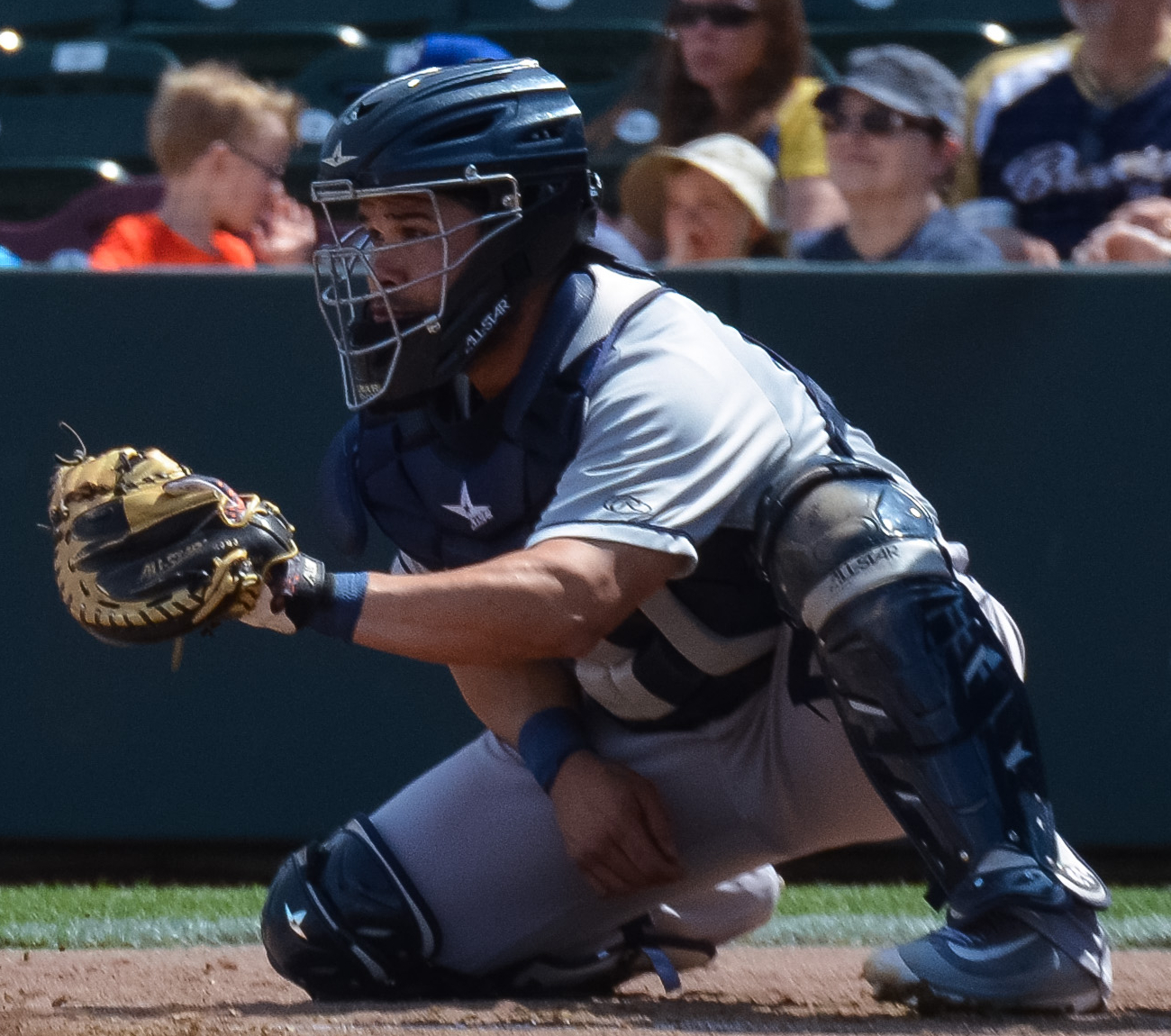
Pinto playing for the Colorado Springs Sky Sox in 2016

Pinto spent the 2016 season with the Colorado Springs Sky Sox of the Triple–A Pacific Coast League. The Brewers promoted Pinto to the major leagues on September 20. In six games for Milwaukee, he went 0–for–5 with a walk. On November 7, Pinto was removed from the 40–man roster and sent outright to Colorado Springs. He subsequently elected free agency in lieu of an outright assignment.

=== San Francisco Giants ===
On December 26, 2016, Pinto signed a minor league contract with the San Francisco Giants. He did not play in a game for the organization and was released on October 31, 2017.

== See also ==
- List of Major League Baseball players from Venezuela
