= Scott Diamond =

Canadian baseball player

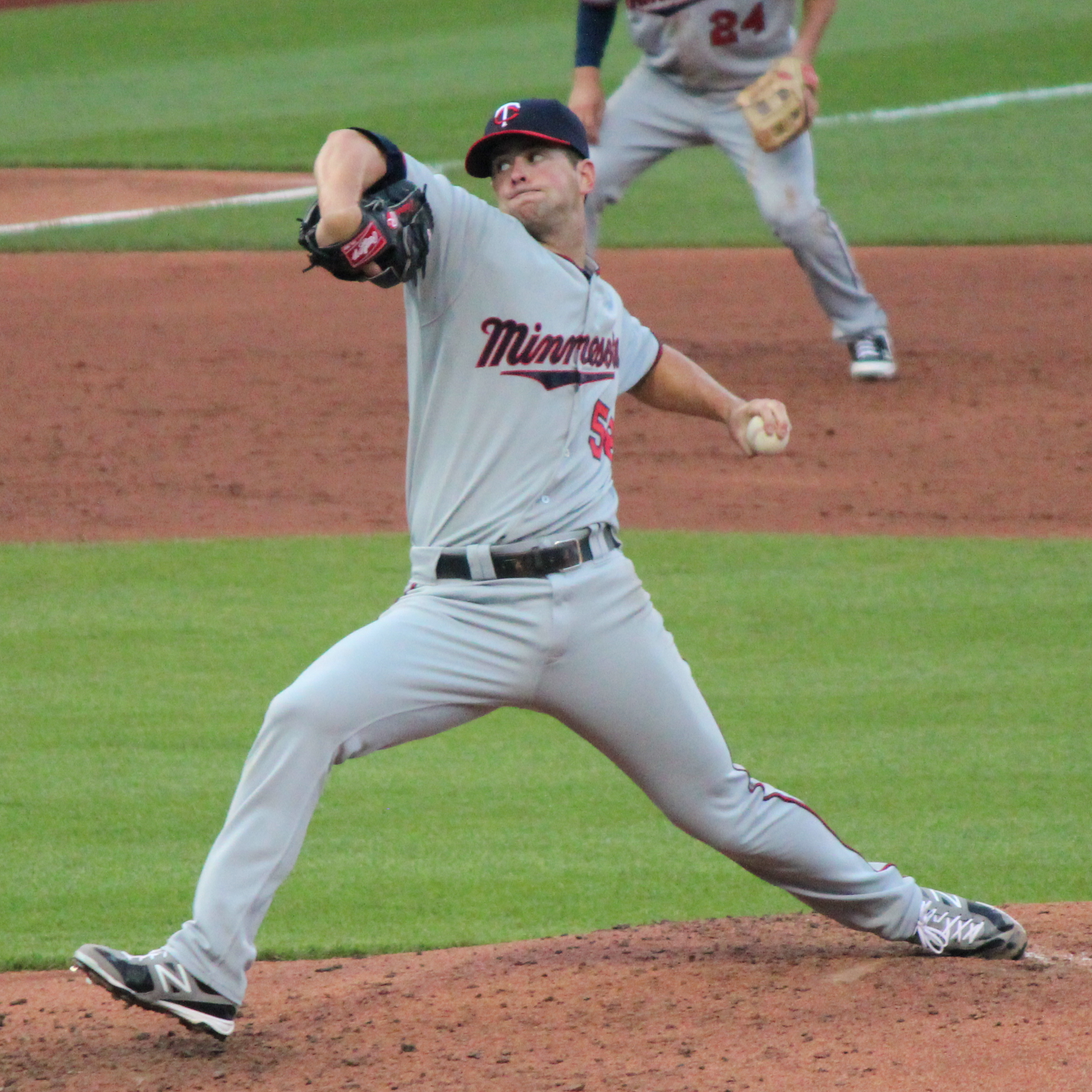
- Diamond with the Minnesota Twins in 2012
- Pitcher
- Born: July 30, 1986 (age 40); Guelph, Ontario, Canada
- Batted: Left Threw: Left

Professional debut
- MLB: July 18, 2011, for the Minnesota Twins
- KBO: April 19, 2017, for the SK Wyverns

Last appearance
- MLB: June 13, 2016, for the Toronto Blue Jays
- KBO: September 29, 2017, for the SK Wyverns

MLB statistics
- Win–loss record: 19–27
- Earned run average: 4.50
- Strikeouts: 161

KBO statistics
- Win–loss record: 10–7
- Earned run average: 4.42
- Strikeouts: 59
- Stats at Baseball Reference

Teams
- Minnesota Twins (2011–2013); Toronto Blue Jays (2016); SK Wyverns (2017)

Scott Michael Diamond (born July 30, 1986) is a Canadian former professional baseball pitcher. He played in Major League Baseball (MLB) for the Minnesota Twins and Toronto Blue Jays, and in the KBO League for the SK Wyverns.

== Amateur career ==
Diamond played college baseball at Binghamton University, for the Binghamton Bearcats under head coach Tim Sinicki. In his freshman season, 2005, he was named America East Rookie of the Year. He played three years at Binghamton before he decided to go pro. He is now a member of the Binghamton University Athletic Hall of Fame. Diamond, Mike Augliera, Lee Sosa and Murphy Smith are the most recent Binghamton pitchers to be taken in the Major League Draft and/or go pro.

He also played collegiate summer baseball in 2006 and 2007 with the Martinsville Mustangs of the Coastal Plain League (CPL). Diamond led the CPL in earned run average (ERA) in 2006, posting a 0.50 ERA in 54 1/3 innings pitched.

== Professional career ==
=== Atlanta Braves ===
Diamond was not selected in the 2008 Major League Baseball draft. He signed as an undrafted free-agent with the Atlanta Braves organization.

Diamond played for the Rome Braves and the Myrtle Beach Pelicans in 2008. He was awarded Myrtle Beach Pelicans pitcher of the year award after recording a 15–3 record and a 2.89 ERA. He played for the Mississippi Braves in 2009 and 2010 before being promoted to the Gwinnett Braves during the 2010 season.

Diamond was on the roster for Canada in the 2009 World Baseball Classic, where he made a relief appearance for three innings in their game against the Italian national baseball team at the Rogers Centre.

=== Minnesota Twins ===
On December 9, 2010, Diamond was selected by the Minnesota Twins in the 2010 Rule 5 draft. Towards the conclusion of spring training, the Twins acquired Diamond from the Braves for prospect Billy Bulluck, allowing them to send Diamond to the minors. The Twins purchased his contract on July 17, and he made his MLB debut the following day.

In 2012, Diamond began the season with the Triple-A Rochester Red Wings. After starting six games and compiling a 4–1 record and a 2.60 ERA in 34 2/3 innings, he was called up to the Twins on May 7. On May 8, Diamond beat the Los Angeles Angels of Anaheim, allowing four hits and one walk in seven shutout innings. Diamond then became an everyday starter for the team, recording 8 wins by mid-July. On July 27, 2012, Diamond pitched his first career complete-game/shutout against the Cleveland Indians. In the start, he allowed only three hits and struck out six batters as the Twins won 11–0. Diamond was ejected by umpire Wally Bell from a game against the Texas Rangers on August 23 after throwing a pitch behind the head of Josh Hamilton. Diamond was suspended for six games as a result of that incident. In his first full season, he led the American League in fewest Walks Allowed per 9 Innings Pitched, allowing only 1.613.

On March 22, 2013, Diamond was placed on the 15-day disabled list to start the 2013 season. Diamond came off the disabled list on April 13. Diamond was optioned to Rochester on August 2. He was recalled on September 9, after Rochester was eliminated from the International League playoffs.

On March 26, 2014, Diamond was placed on waivers. He was outrighted to Triple-A Rochester the next day. On July 12, Diamond was released by the Twins organization.

=== Cincinnati Reds ===
On July 17, 2014, Diamond signed a minor league contract with the Cincinnati Reds. He was assigned to their Triple A affiliate Louisville Bats. He became a free agent following the season.

=== Tampa Bay Rays ===
On April 5, 2015, Diamond signed a minor league contract with the Tampa Bay Rays. He elected free agency on November 6, 2015.

=== Toronto Blue Jays ===
On November 24, 2015, Diamond signed a minor league contract with the Toronto Blue Jays that includes an invitation to spring training. He was assigned to minor league camp on March 18, 2016. Diamond was called up by the Blue Jays on June 13, and was designated for assignment the following day. On June 17, Diamond was outrighted back to the Triple-A Buffalo Bisons. Diamond elected free agency on October 14, 2016.

=== SK Wyverns ===
On December 11, 2016, Diamond signed a one-year, $600,000 contract with the SK Wyverns of the KBO League. He became a free agent after the season.

== See also ==
- Rule 5 draft results
