= 2012 Minnesota Twins season =

2012 Minnesota Twins
- League: American League
- Division: Central
- Ballpark: Target Field
- City: Minneapolis, Minnesota
- Record: 66–96 (.407)
- Divisional place: 5th
- Owners: Jim Pohlad
- General managers: Terry Ryan
- Managers: Ron Gardenhire
- Television: Fox Sports North (Dick Bremer, Bert Blyleven, Ron Coomer)
- Radio: KSTP (Cory Provus, Dan Gladden, Kris Atteberry)
- Stats: ESPN.com; Baseball Reference

The 2012 Minnesota Twins season was the 52nd season for the franchise in Minnesota, and the 112th overall in the American League. The Twins wound up with a 66–96 record, fifth place in the American League Central.

== Regular season ==
On May 2, the Twins were no-hit for the fifth time in their history. Jered Weaver of the Anaheim Angels threw 121 pitches, striking out nine, walking one and allowing no hits. Four of the Twins' no-hit losses have occurred in California. Two of the no-hitters were perfect games (Catfish Hunter, 1968 and David Wells, 1998).

Joe Mauer is the lone Minnesota selection to the All-Star Game, played July 10 in Kauffman Stadium. As a reserve catcher, he enters the game in the top of the eighth as a replacement first baseman and goes 1 for 1 with a single.

On September 8, the Twins retired former manager Tom Kelly's number '10'. He is the seventh Twin so honored, joining Harmon Killebrew (3), Rod Carew (29), Tony Oliva (6), Kent Hrbek (14), Kirby Puckett (34) and Bert Blyleven (28). The number '42' is retired across all of the major leagues in honor of Jackie Robinson.

Outfielder Josh Willingham wins the Silver Slugger Award for the only time in his career.

=== Season standings ===
==== American League Central ====
AL Central
| Team | W | L | Pct. | GB | Home | Road |
|---|---|---|---|---|---|---|
| Detroit Tigers | 88 | 74 | .543 | — | 50‍–‍31 | 38‍–‍43 |
| Chicago White Sox | 85 | 77 | .525 | 3 | 45‍–‍36 | 40‍–‍41 |
| Kansas City Royals | 72 | 90 | .444 | 16 | 37‍–‍44 | 35‍–‍46 |
| Cleveland Indians | 68 | 94 | .420 | 20 | 37‍–‍44 | 31‍–‍50 |
| Minnesota Twins | 66 | 96 | .407 | 22 | 31‍–‍50 | 35‍–‍46 |

==== American League Wild Card ====
Division winners
| Team | W | L | Pct. |
|---|---|---|---|
| New York Yankees | 95 | 67 | .586 |
| Oakland Athletics | 94 | 68 | .580 |
| Detroit Tigers | 88 | 74 | .543 |

Wild Card teams (Top 2 teams qualify for postseason)
| Team | W | L | Pct. | GB |
|---|---|---|---|---|
| Texas Rangers | 93 | 69 | .574 | — |
| Baltimore Orioles | 93 | 69 | .574 | — |
| Tampa Bay Rays | 90 | 72 | .556 | 3 |
| Los Angeles Angels of Anaheim | 89 | 73 | .549 | 4 |
| Chicago White Sox | 85 | 77 | .525 | 8 |
| Seattle Mariners | 75 | 87 | .463 | 18 |
| Toronto Blue Jays | 73 | 89 | .451 | 20 |
| Kansas City Royals | 72 | 90 | .444 | 21 |
| Boston Red Sox | 69 | 93 | .426 | 24 |
| Cleveland Indians | 68 | 94 | .420 | 25 |
| Minnesota Twins | 66 | 96 | .407 | 27 |

== Game log ==
Legend
| Twins Win | Twins Loss | Postponed |

2012 Game Log
April (6–16)

| # | Date | Opponent | Score | Win | Loss | Save | Attendance | Record |
|---|---|---|---|---|---|---|---|---|
| 1 | April 6 | @ Orioles | 2–4 | Arrieta (1–0) | Pavano (0–1) | Johnson (1) | 46,773 | 0–1 |
| 2 | April 7 | @ Orioles | 2–8 | Hunter (1–0) | Liriano (0–1) | | 31,532 | 0–2 |
| 3 | April 8 | @ Orioles | 1–3 | Hammel (1–0) | Swarzak (0–1) | Johnson (2) | 14,738 | 0–3 |
| 4 | April 9 | Angels | 1–5 | Wilson (1–0) | Blackburn (0–1) | | 39,414 | 0–4 |
| 5 | April 11 | Angels | 6–5 | Gray (1–0) | Takahashi (0–1) | Capps (1) | 31,413 | 1–4 |
| 6 | April 12 | Angels | 10–9 | Gray (2–0) | Thompson (0–1) | Capps (2) | 31,782 | 2–4 |
| 7 | April 13 | Rangers | 1–4 | Harrison (2–0) | Swarzak (0–2) | Ogando | 31,400 | 2–5 |
| 8 | April 14 | Rangers | 2–6 | Ross (1–0) | Duensing (0–1) | | 35,854 | 2–6 |
| 9 | April 15 | Rangers | 3–4 | Ross (2–0) | Perkins (0–1) | Nathan (3) | 32,093 | 2–7 |
| 10 | April 16 | @ Yankees | 7–3 | Pavano (1–1) | García (0–1) | | 40,218 | 3–7 |
| 11 | April 17 | @ Yankees | 3–8 | Sabathia (1–0) | Liriano (0–2) | | 40,194 | 3–8 |
| 12 | April 18 | @ Yankees | 6–5 | Marquis (1–0) | Kuroda (1–2) | Capps (3) | 36,831 | 4–8 |
| 13 | April 19 | @ Yankees | 6–7 | Hughes (1–2) | Swarzak (0–3) | Rivera (3) | 40,327 | 4–9 |
| 14 | April 20 | @ Rays | 5–4 | Maloney (1–0) | Gomes (0–1) | Capps (4) | 18,763 | 5–9 |
| 15 | April 21 | @ Rays | 1–4 | Shields (3–0) | Pavano (1–2) | Rodney (5) | 31,774 | 5–10 |
| 16 | April 22 | @ Rays | 2–6 | Niemann (1–2) | Liriano (0–3) | | 26,507 | 5–11 |
| 17 | April 23 | Red Sox | 5–6 | Bard (1–2) | Capps (0–1) | Aceves (3) | 32,351 | 5–12 |
| 18 | April 24 | Red Sox | 2–11 | Beckett (2–2) | Blackburn (0–2) | | 33,651 | 5–13 |
| 19 | April 25 | Red Sox | 6–7 | Buchholz (2–1) | Hendriks (0–1) | Aceves (4) | 32,254 | 5–14 |
| 20 | April 27 | Royals | 6–7 | Mijares (1–1) | Duensing (0–2) | Broxton (3) | 33,315 | 5–15 |
| | April 28 | Royals | Postponed (rain); Makeup: 6/30 | | | | | |
| 21 | April 29 | Royals | 7–4 | Marquis (2–0) | Chen (0–3) | | 34,201 | 6–15 |
| 22 | April 30 | @ Angels | 3–4 | Wilson (3–2) | Blackburn (0–3) | Downs (2) | 27,027 | 6–16 |

May (12–16)

| # | Date | Opponent | Score | Win | Loss | Save | Attendance | Record |
|---|---|---|---|---|---|---|---|---|
| 23 | May 1 | @ Angels | 0–4 | Williams (2–1) | Liriano (0–4) | | 30,039 | 6–17 |
| 24 | May 2 | @ Angels | 0–9 | Weaver^{†} (4–0) | Hendriks (0–2) | | 27,288 | 6–18 |
| 25 | May 4 | @ Mariners | 3–2 | Pavano (2–2) | Wilhelmsen (1–1) | Capps (5) | 22,492 | 7–18 |
| 26 | May 5 | @ Mariners | 0–7 | Hernández (3–1) | Marquis (2–1) | | 28,437 | 7–19 |
| 27 | May 6 | @ Mariners | 2–5 | Noesí (2–3) | Blackburn (0–4) | | 23,913 | 7–20 |
| 28 | May 7 | Angels | 3–8 | Weaver (5–0) | Liriano (0–5) | | 31,382 | 7–21 |
| 29 | May 8 | Angels | 5–0 | Diamond (1–0) | Haren (1–3) | | 30,776 | 8–21 |
| 30 | May 9 | Angels | 2–6 | Santana (1–6) | Pavano (2–3) | | 31,915 | 8–22 |
| 31 | May 10 | Blue Jays | 2–6 | Álvarez (3–2) | Marquis (2–2) | | 31,438 | 8–23 |
| 32 | May 11 | Blue Jays | 7–6 | Blackburn (1–4) | Drabek (2–4) | Capps (6) | 33,387 | 9–23 |
| 33 | May 12 | Blue Jays | 1–2 | Hutchison (2–1) | Walters (0–1) | Janssen (2) | 38,820 | 9–24 |
| 34 | May 13 | Blue Jays | 4–3 | Diamond (2–0) | Romero (4–1) | Capps (7) | 36,889 | 10–24 |
| 35 | May 14 | Indians | 4–5 | Smith (3–1) | Capps (0–2) | C. Perez (12) | 32,313 | 10–25 |
| 36 | May 15 | Indians | 0–5 | Lowe (6–1) | Marquis (2–3) | | 35,732 | 10–26 |
| 37 | May 16 | @ Tigers | 11–7 | Burnett (1–0) | Below (2–1) | | 33,955 | 11–26 |
| 38 | May 17 | @ Tigers | 4–3 | Walters (1–1) | Fister (0–2) | Capps (8) | 37,840 | 12–26 |
| 39 | May 18 | @ Brewers | 11–3 | Diamond (3–0) | Estrada (0–3) | | 32,421 | 13–26 |
| 40 | May 19 | @ Brewers | 5–4 (11) | Gray (3–0) | Parra (0–1) | Capps (9) | 42,398 | 14–26 |
| 41 | May 20 | @ Brewers | 4–16 | Greinke (5–1) | Marquis (2–4) | | 33,064 | 14–27 |
| 42 | May 22 | @ White Sox | 9–2 | Walters (2–1) | Floyd (3–5) | | 20,026 | 15–27 |
| 43 | May 23 | @ White Sox | 0–6 | Sale (5–2) | Diamond (3–1) | | 20,064 | 15–28 |
| 44 | May 24 | @ White Sox | 8–11 | Jones (2–0) | De Vries (0–1) | | 20,167 | 15–29 |
| 45 | May 25 | Tigers | 6–10 | Smyly (2–1) | Swarzak (0–4) | | 37,688 | 15–30 |
| 46 | May 26 | Tigers | 3–6 | Scherzer (4–3) | Pavano (2–4) | Valverde (8) | 37,360 | 15–31 |
| 47 | May 27 | Tigers | 3–4 | Villarreal (1–0) | Capps (0–3) | Valverde (9) | 38,710 | 15–32 |
| 48 | May 28 | Athletics | 5–4 | Burnett (2–0) | Cook (1–1) | Capps (10) | 34,709 | 16–32 |
| 49 | May 29 | Athletics | 3–2 | Perkins (1–1) | Fuentes (2–1) | | 31,781 | 17–32 |
| 50 | May 30 | Athletics | 4–0 | Liriano (1–5) | Ross (2–6) | | 35,103 | 18–32 |

June (14–13)

| # | Date | Opponent | Score | Win | Loss | Save | Attendance | Record |
|---|---|---|---|---|---|---|---|---|
| 51 | June 1 | @ Indians | 1–7 | Lowe (7–3) | Pavano (2–5) | | 19,904 | 18–33 |
| 52 | June 2 | @ Indians | 7–4 | Duensing (1–2) | Tomlin (2–3) | Capps (11) | 25,469 | 19–33 |
| 53 | June 3 | @ Indians | 6–3 | Diamond (4–1) | Masterson (2–5) | Capps (12) | 21,238 | 20–33 |
| 54 | June 4 | @ Royals | 10–7 | De Vries (1–1) | Smith (1–2) | Capps (13) | 16,531 | 21–33 |
| 55 | June 5 | @ Royals | 0–1 | Chen (5–5) | Liriano (1–6) | Broxton (14) | 23,934 | 21–34 |
| 56 | June 6 | @ Royals | 4–2 | Blackburn (2–4) | Mendoza (2–3) | Capps (14) | 18,386 | 22–34 |
| 57 | June 8 | Cubs | 8–7 (10) | Capps (1–3) | Camp (2–3) | | 38,014 | 23–34 |
| 58 | June 9 | Cubs | 11–3 | Diamond (5–1) | Samardzija (5–4) | | 39,309 | 24–34 |
| 59 | June 10 | Cubs | 2–8 | Dempster (2–3) | Liriano (1–7) | | 37,526 | 24–35 |
| 60 | June 12 | Phillies | 11–7 | Blackburn (3–4) | Kendrick (2–6) | | 32,622 | 25–35 |
| 61 | June 13 | Phillies | 8–9 | Hamels (9–3) | Walters (2–2) | Papelbon (17) | 32,581 | 25–36 |
| 62 | June 14 | Phillies | 1–6 | Blanton (6–6) | Diamond (5–2) | | 32,205 | 25–37 |
| 63 | June 15 | Brewers | 3–5 | Loe (3–2) | Capps (1–4) | Axford (11) | 37,295 | 25–38 |
| 64 | June 16 | Brewers | 2–6 | Fiers (2–2) | Hendriks (0–3) | | 37,698 | 25–39 |
| 65 | June 17 | Brewers | 5–4 (15) | Swarzak (1–4) | Dillard (0–2) | | 39,206 | 26–39 |
| 66 | June 19 | @ Pirates | 2–7 | Correia (3–6) | Diamond (5–3) | | 19,936 | 26–40 |
| 67 | June 20 | @ Pirates | 2–1 | Burton (1–0) | Grilli (1–2) | Perkins (1) | 19,878 | 27–40 |
| 68 | June 21 | @ Pirates | 1–9 | McDonald (6–3) | Hendriks (0–4) | | 21,563 | 27–41 |
| 69 | June 22 | @ Reds | 5–4 | Blackburn (4–4) | Bailey (5–5) | Perkins (2) | 33,531 | 28–41 |
| 70 | June 23 | @ Reds | 0–6 | Cueto (9–3) | Duensing (1–3) | | 41,750 | 28–42 |
| 71 | June 24 | @ Reds | 4–3 | Diamond (6–3) | Chapman (4–4) | Burton (1) | 34,513 | 29–42 |
| 72 | June 25 | White Sox | 4–1 | Liriano (2–7) | Peavy (6–4) | Burton (2) | 35,695 | 30–42 |
| 73 | June 26 | White Sox | 2–3 | Floyd (6–7) | Hendriks (0–5) | Reed (10) | 35,102 | 30–43 |
| 74 | June 27 | White Sox | 5–12 | Sale (9–2) | Blackburn (4–5) | | 36,539 | 30–44 |
| 75 | June 29 | Royals | 3–4 | Mendoza (3–4) | Duensing (1–4) | Broxton (20) | 33,359 | 30–45 |
| 76 | June 30 | Royals | 7–2 | Diamond (7–3) | Sánchez (1–4) | | 37,694 | 31–45 |
| 77 | June 30 | Royals | 5–1 | De Vries (2–1) | Hochevar (5–8) | | 37,629 | 32–45 |

July (12–14)

| # | Date | Opponent | Score | Win | Loss | Save | Attendance | Record |
|---|---|---|---|---|---|---|---|---|
| 78 | July 1 | Royals | 10–8 | Gray (4–0) | Chen (7–7) | | 37,819 | 33–45 |
| 79 | July 2 | @ Tigers | 6–4 | Swarzak (2–4) | Fister (1–6) | Perkins (3) | 37,406 | 34–45 |
| 80 | July 3 | @ Tigers | 8–6 | Gray (5–0) | Villarreal (3–2) | Perkins (4) | 36,757 | 35–45 |
| 81 | July 4 | @ Tigers | 1–5 | Verlander (9–5) | Duensing (1–5) | | 41,023 | 35–46 |
| 82 | July 5 | @ Tigers | 3–7 | Dotel (2–2) | Burnett (2–1) | | 33,350 | 35–47 |
| 83 | July 6 | @ Rangers | 5–1 | Liriano (3–7) | Pérez (1–1) | | 47,240 | 36–47 |
| 84 | July 7 | @ Rangers | 3–4 (10) | Nathan (1–2) | Waldrop (0–1) | | 47,067 | 36–48 |
| 85 | July 8 | @ Rangers | 3–4 (13) | Feldman (3–6) | Burnett (2–2) | | 43,268 | 36–49 |
All-Star Break: National League defeats American League 8–0.
| 86 | July 13 | Athletics | 3–6 | Griffin (1–0) | Liriano (3–8) | Cook (9) | 33,230 | 36–50 |
| 87 | July 14 | Athletics | 3–9 | Milone (9–6) | De Vries (2–2) | | 39,084 | 36–51 |
| 88 | July 15 | Athletics | 4–9 | Parker (6–4) | Duensing (1–6) | | 36,853 | 36–52 |
| 89 | July 16 | Orioles | 19–7 | Diamond (8–3) | Tillman (1–1) | | 32,445 | 37–52 |
| 90 | July 17 | Orioles | 6–4 | Burnett (3–2) | Ayala (2–3) | Burton (3) | 32,202 | 38–52 |
| 91 | July 18 | Orioles | 1–2 | Hunter (4–4) | Liriano (3–9) | Johnson (27) | 33,195 | 38–53 |
| 92 | July 19 | Orioles | 3–4 | Chen (8–5) | Burnett (3–3) | Johnson (28) | 37,676 | 38–54 |
| 93 | July 20 | @ Royals | 2–1 (11) | Fien (1–0) | Broxton (1–2) | Perkins (5) | 25,719 | 39–54 |
| 94 | July 21 | @ Royals | 3–7 | Mendoza (4–6) | Diamond (8–4) | Crow (2) | 26,747 | 39–55 |
| 95 | July 22 | @ Royals | 7–5 | Deduno (1–0) | Guthrie (3–10) | | 23,252 | 40–55 |
| 96 | July 23 | @ White Sox | 4–7 | Floyd (8–8) | Liriano (3–10) | Reed (16) | 37,788 | 40–56 |
| 97 | July 24 | @ White Sox | 4–11 | Jones (4–0) | Fien (1–1) | | 34,715 | 40–57 |
| 98 | July 25 | @ White Sox | 2–8 | Peavy (8–7) | Blackburn (4–6) | | 32,261 | 40–58 |
| 99 | July 27 | Indians | 11–0 | Diamond (9–4) | Tomlin (5–8) | | 37,820 | 41–58 |
| 100 | July 28 | Indians | 12–5 | Deduno (2–0) | Masterson (7–9) | | 39,166 | 42–58 |
| 101 | July 29 | Indians | 5–1 | Duensing (2–6) | Jiménez (8–10) | | 34,720 | 43–58 |
| 102 | July 30 | White Sox | 7–6 | Perkins (2–1) | Myers (0–5) | | 35,018 | 44–58 |
| 103 | July 31 | White Sox | 3–4 | Thornton (3–6) | Gray (5–1) | Reed (17) | 36,424 | 44–59 |

August (9–19)

| # | Date | Opponent | Score | Win | Loss | Save | Attendance | Record |
|---|---|---|---|---|---|---|---|---|
| 104 | August 1 | White Sox | 2–3 | Peavy (9–7) | Diamond (9–5) | Reed (18) | 34,823 | 44–60 |
| 105 | August 2 | @ Red Sox | 5–0 | Deduno (3–0) | Lester (5–9) | Perkins (6) | 37,191 | 45–60 |
| 106 | August 3 | @ Red Sox | 6–5 (10) | Gray (6–1) | Padilla (4–1) | Burton (4) | 37,285 | 46–60 |
| 107 | August 4 | @ Red Sox | 6–4 | Burnett (4–3) | Aceves (2–7) | Burton (5) | 37,914 | 47–60 |
| 108 | August 5 | @ Red Sox | 4–6 | Morales (3–2) | Blackburn (4–7) | Aceves (23) | 37,019 | 47–61 |
| 109 | August 6 | @ Indians | 14–3 | Diamond (10–5) | McAllister (4–4) | | 18,775 | 48–61 |
| 110 | August 7 | @ Indians | 7–5 | Robertson (1–0) | Perez (0–4) | Perkins (7) | 14,813 | 49–61 |
| 111 | August 8 | @ Indians | 2–6 | Masterson (8–10) | Duensing (2–7) | | 18,805 | 49–62 |
| 112 | August 10 | Rays | 6–12 | Hellickson (7–7) | De Vries (2–3) | | 38,108 | 49–63 |
| 113 | August 11 | Rays | 2–4 | Price (15–4) | Blackburn (4–8) | Rodney (35) | 39,512 | 49–64 |
| 114 | August 12 | Rays | 3–7 (10) | Farnsworth (1–3) | Burnett (4–4) | Rodney (36) | 35,327 | 49–65 |
| 115 | August 13 | Tigers | 9–3 | Deduno (4–0) | Sánchez (6–10) | | 34,366 | 50–65 |
| 116 | August 14 | Tigers | 4–8 | Fister (7–7) | Duensing (2–8) | | 37,544 | 50–66 |
| 117 | August 15 | Tigers | 1–5 | Scherzer (12–6) | De Vries (2–4) | | 37,118 | 50–67 |
| 118 | August 17 | @ Mariners | 3–5 | Iwakuma (4–3) | Blackburn (4–9) | Wilhelmsen (17) | 22,602 | 50–68 |
| 119 | August 18 | @ Mariners | 2–3 | Wilhelmsen (4–2) | Robertson (1–1) | | 21,154 | 50–69 |
| 120 | August 19 | @ Mariners | 1–5 | Beavan (8–7) | Deduno (4–1) | Kinney (1) | 22,635 | 50–70 |
| 121 | August 20 | @ Athletics | 7–2 | Duensing (3–8) | McCarthy (6–5) | | 10,274 | 51–70 |
| 122 | August 21 | @ Athletics | 1–4 | Anderson (1–0) | De Vries (2–5) | Balfour (12) | 13,116 | 51–71 |
| 123 | August 22 | @ Athletics | 1–5 | Milone (10–9) | Hendriks (0–6) | | 16,657 | 51–72 |
| 124 | August 23 | @ Rangers | 6–10 | Adams (3–3) | Burton (1–1) | Nathan (25) | 33,762 | 51–73 |
| 125 | August 24 | @ Rangers | 0–8 | Harrison (15–7) | Deduno (4–2) | | 45,823 | 51–74 |
| 126 | August 25 | @ Rangers | 3–9 | Dempster (8–6) | Duensing (3–9) | | 44,215 | 51–75 |
| 127 | August 26 | @ Rangers | 6–5 | De Vries (3–5) | Feldman (6–10) | Perkins (8) | 37,785 | 52–75 |
| 128 | August 27 | Mariners | 0–1 | Hernández (13–5) | Hendriks (0–7) | | 31,883 | 52–76 |
| 129 | August 28 | Mariners | 2–5 | Iwakuma (5–3) | Diamond (10–6) | Wilhelmsen (20) | 29,854 | 52–77 |
| 130 | August 29 | Mariners | 10–0 | Deduno (5–2) | Vargas (13–9) | | 29,281 | 53–77 |
| 131 | August 30 | Mariners | 4–5 | Beavan (9–8) | Duensing (3–10) | Wilhelmsen (21) | 32,578 | 53–78 |
| | August 31 | @ Royals | Postponed (rain). Makeup: 9/1 | | | | | |

September/October (13–18)

| # | Date | Opponent | Score | Win | Loss | Save | Attendance | Record |
|---|---|---|---|---|---|---|---|---|
| 132 | September 1 | @ Royals | 3–1 | De Vries (4–5) | Smith (4–7) | Perkins (9) | | 54–78 |
| 133 | September 1 | @ Royals | 8–7 | Swarzak (3–4) | Hochevar (7–13) | Perkins (10) | 23,189 | 55–78 |
| 134 | September 2 | @ Royals | 4–6 | Collins (5–2) | Vásquez (0–1) | Holland (10) | 23,641 | 55–79 |
| 135 | September 3 | @ White Sox | 2–4 | Santiago (3–1) | Deduno (5–3) | Reed (25) | 21,676 | 55–80 |
| 136 | September 4 | @ White Sox | 18–9 | Diamond (11–6) | Quintana (5–4) | | 15,698 | 56–80 |
| 137 | September 5 | @ White Sox | 2–6 | Peavy (10–10) | Walters (2–3) | | 17,336 | 56–81 |
| 138 | September 7 | Indians | 6–7 | Huff (1–0) | Robertson (1–2) | Perez (35) | 30,111 | 56–82 |
| 139 | September 8 | Indians | 3–0 | De Vries (5–5) | McAllister (5–7) | Perkins (11) | 33,698 | 57–82 |
| 140 | September 9 | Indians | 8–7 | Duensing (4–10) | Pestano (3–2) | | 30,219 | 58–82 |
| 141 | September 10 | Indians | 7–2 | Deduno (6–3) | Masterson (11–13) | | 27,526 | 59–82 |
| 142 | September 11 | Royals | 1–9 | Smith (5–7) | Diamond (11–7) | | 28,993 | 59–83 |
| 143 | September 12 | Royals | 5–10 | Hochevar (8–13) | Walters (2–4) | | 28,139 | 59–84 |
| 144 | September 13 | Royals | 4–3 (10) | Perkins (3–1) | Bueno (1–1) | | 28,669 | 60–84 |
| 145 | September 14 | White Sox | 0–6 | Sale (17–6) | Vásquez (0–2) | | 30,729 | 60–85 |
| 146 | September 15 | White Sox | 3–5 | Liriano (6–11) | Deduno (6–4) | Thornton (3) | 36,308 | 60–86 |
| 147 | September 16 | White Sox | 2–9 | Peavy (11–11) | Diamond (11–8) | | 31,722 | 60–87 |
| 148 | September 18 | @ Indians | 6–5 (12) | Robertson (2–2) | Maine (2–2) | Perkins (12) | 10,342 | 61–87 |
| 149 | September 19 | @ Indians | 6–4 | Hendriks (1–7) | McAllister (5–8) | Perkins (13) | 13,519 | 62–87 |
| 150 | September 20 | @ Indians | 3–4 (10) | Rogers (3–3) | Swarzak (3–5) | | 12,331 | 62–88 |
| | September 21 | @ Tigers | Postponed (rain); Makeup: 9/23 | | | | | |
| 151 | September 22 | @ Tigers | 0–8 | Fister (10–9) | Deduno (6–5) | | 40,586 | 62–89 |
| 152 | September 23 | @ Tigers | 10–4 | Diamond (12–8) | Scherzer (16–7) | | 40,438 | 63–89 |
| 153 | September 23 | @ Tigers | 2–1 (10) | Burton (2–1) | Valverde (3–4) | Perkins (14) | 39,839 | 64–89 |
| 154 | September 24 | Yankees | 3–6 | Pettitte (5–3) | Hendriks (1–8) | | 33,720 | 64–90 |
| 155 | September 25 | Yankees | 5–4 | Fien (2–1) | Hughes (16–13) | Perkins (15) | 33,346 | 65–90 |
| 156 | September 26 | Yankees | 2–8 | Sabathia (14–6) | Duensing (4–11) | | 33,251 | 65–91 |
| 157 | September 28 | Tigers | 4–2 | Burton (3–1) | Villarreal (3–5) | Perkins (16) | 30,315 | 66–91 |
| 158 | September 29 | Tigers | 4–6 | Verlander (17–8) | Walters (2–5) | Valverde (33) | 32,839 | 66–92 |
| 159 | September 30 | Tigers | 1–2 | Coke (2–3) | Burton (3–2) | Valverde (34) | 32,554 | 66–93 |
| 160 | October 1 | @ Blue Jays | 5–6 (10) | Lyon (4–2) | Duensing (4–12) | | 12,359 | 66–94 |
| 161 | October 2 | @ Blue Jays | 3–4 | Jenkins (1–3) | Swarzak (3–6) | Janssen (22) | 13,930 | 66–95 |
| 162 | October 3 | @ Blue Jays | 1–2 | Morrow (10–7) | Diamond (12–9) | Lyon (1) | 19,769 | 66–96 |

^{†} No Hitter

== Roster ==
2012 Minnesota Twins
Roster
| Pitchers: 53 Nick Blackburn; 31 Alex Burnett; 61 Jared Burton; 55 Matt Capps; 38 Cole De Vries; 21 Samuel Deduno; 58 Scott Diamond; 52 Brian Duensing; 50 Casey Fien; 60 Jeff Gray; 62 Liam Hendriks; 47 Francisco Liriano; 44 Matt Maloney; 49 Jeff Manship; 21 Jason Marquis; 17 Lester Oliveros; 48 Carl Pavano; 67 Luis Perdomo; 15 Glen Perkins; 64 Tyler Robertson; 51 Anthony Swarzak; 59 Esmerling Vásquez; 57 Kyle Waldrop; 39 P. J. Walters | Catchers: 41 Drew Butera; 18 Ryan Doumit; 23 Chris Herrmann; 7 Joe Mauer; Infielders: 37 Sean Burroughs; 8 Jamey Carroll; 12 Alexi Casilla; 20 Brian Dozier; 5 Eduardo Escobar; 25 Pedro Florimón; 38 Luke Hughes; 33 Justin Morneau; 1 Tsuyoshi Nishioka; 27 Chris Parmelee; 24 Trevor Plouffe; 22 Danny Valencia | Outfielders: 22 Matt Carson; 25 Erik Komatsu; 19 Darin Mastroianni; 11 Ben Revere; 2 Denard Span; 36 Clete Thomas; 16 Josh Willingham | Manager: 35 Ron Gardenhire; Coaches: 40 Rick Anderson (pitching); 75 Nate Dammann (bullpen catcher); 9 Steve Liddle (bench); 43 Rick Stelmaszek (bullpen); 45 Scott Ullger (third base); 46 Joe Vavra (hitting); 13 Jerry White (first base) |

== Player stats ==
=== Batting ===
Note: G = Games played; AB = At bats; R = Runs scored; H = Hits; 2B = Doubles; 3B = Triples; HR = Home runs; RBI = Runs batted in; AVG = Batting average; SB = Stolen bases

| Player | G | AB | R | H | 2B | 3B | HR | RBI | AVG | SB |
|---|---|---|---|---|---|---|---|---|---|---|
| Nick Blackburn | 1 | 2 | 0 | 0 | 0 | 0 | 0 | 0 | .000 | 0 |
| Alex Burnett | 4 | 0 | 0 | 0 | 0 | 0 | 0 | 0 | — | 0 |
| Sean Burroughs | 10 | 17 | 0 | 2 | 1 | 0 | 0 | 1 | .118 | 0 |
| Jared Burton | 3 | 0 | 0 | 0 | 0 | 0 | 0 | 0 | — | 0 |
| Drew Butera | 42 | 111 | 7 | 22 | 6 | 0 | 1 | 5 | .198 | 0 |
| Matt Capps | 1 | 0 | 0 | 0 | 0 | 0 | 0 | 0 | — | 0 |
| Jamey Carroll | 138 | 470 | 65 | 126 | 18 | 1 | 1 | 40 | .268 | 9 |
| Matt Carson | 26 | 66 | 3 | 15 | 1 | 0 | 0 | 4 | .227 | 0 |
| Alexi Casilla | 106 | 299 | 33 | 72 | 17 | 2 | 1 | 30 | .241 | 21 |
| Scott Diamond | 2 | 4 | 1 | 1 | 0 | 0 | 0 | 0 | .250 | 0 |
| Ryan Doumit | 134 | 484 | 56 | 133 | 34 | 1 | 17 | 75 | .275 | 0 |
| Brian Dozier | 84 | 316 | 33 | 74 | 11 | 1 | 6 | 33 | .234 | 9 |
| Brian Duensing | 3 | 0 | 0 | 0 | 0 | 0 | 0 | 0 | — | 0 |
| Eduardo Escobar | 14 | 44 | 4 | 10 | 0 | 0 | 0 | 6 | .214 | 1 |
| Pedro Florimón | 43 | 137 | 16 | 30 | 5 | 2 | 0 | 10 | .219 | 3 |
| Jeff Gray | 3 | 0 | 0 | 0 | 0 | 0 | 0 | 0 | — | 0 |
| Liam Hendriks | 2 | 2 | 0 | 0 | 0 | 0 | 0 | 0 | .000 | 0 |
| Chris Herrmann | 7 | 18 | 0 | 1 | 0 | 0 | 0 | 1 | .056 | 0 |
| Luke Hughes | 4 | 10 | 0 | 2 | 0 | 0 | 0 | 2 | .200 | 1 |
| Erik Komatsu | 15 | 32 | 2 | 7 | 0 | 0 | 0 | 1 | .219 | 0 |
| Francisco Liriano | 2 | 3 | 0 | 0 | 0 | 0 | 0 | 0 | .000 | 0 |
| Jeff Manship | 1 | 0 | 0 | 0 | 0 | 0 | 0 | 0 | — | 0 |
| Jason Marquis | 1 | 0 | 0 | 0 | 0 | 0 | 0 | 0 | — | 0 |
| Darin Mastroianni | 77 | 163 | 22 | 41 | 3 | 2 | 3 | 17 | .252 | 21 |
| Joe Mauer | 147 | 545 | 81 | 174 | 31 | 4 | 10 | 85 | .319 | 8 |
| Justin Morneau | 134 | 505 | 63 | 135 | 26 | 2 | 19 | 77 | .267 | 1 |
| Tsuyoshi Nishioka | 3 | 12 | 0 | 0 | 0 | 0 | 0 | 1 | .000 | 0 |
| Chris Parmelee | 64 | 192 | 18 | 44 | 10 | 2 | 5 | 20 | .229 | 0 |
| Carl Pavano | 1 | 2 | 0 | 0 | 0 | 0 | 0 | 0 | .000 | 0 |
| Glen Perkins | 3 | 0 | 0 | 0 | 0 | 0 | 0 | 0 | — | 0 |
| Trevor Plouffe | 119 | 422 | 56 | 99 | 19 | 1 | 24 | 55 | .235 | 1 |
| Ben Revere | 124 | 511 | 70 | 150 | 13 | 6 | 0 | 32 | .294 | 40 |
| Denard Span | 128 | 516 | 71 | 146 | 38 | 4 | 4 | 41 | .283 | 17 |
| Anthony Swarzak | 2 | 1 | 0 | 0 | 0 | 0 | 0 | 0 | .000 | 0 |
| Clete Thomas | 12 | 28 | 2 | 4 | 1 | 0 | 1 | 4 | .143 | 0 |
| Danny Valencia | 34 | 126 | 13 | 25 | 6 | 1 | 2 | 17 | .198 | 0 |
| Josh Willingham | 145 | 519 | 85 | 135 | 30 | 1 | 35 | 110 | .260 | 3 |
| Team Totals | 162 | 5562 | 701 | 1447 | 270 | 30 | 129 | 667 | .260 | 135 |

=== Pitching ===
Note: W = Wins; L = Losses; ERA = Earned run average; G = Games pitched; GS = Games started; SV = Saves; IP = Innings pitched; R = Runs allowed; ER = Earned runs allowed; BB = Walks allowed; SO = Strikeouts

| Player | W | L | ERA | G | GS | SV | IP | R | ER | BB | SO |
|---|---|---|---|---|---|---|---|---|---|---|---|
| Nick Blackburn | 4 | 9 | 7.39 | 19 | 19 | 0 | 98.2 | 81 | 81 | 26 | 42 |
| Alex Burnett | 4 | 4 | 3.52 | 67 | 0 | 0 | 72.2 | 33 | 28 | 26 | 36 |
| Jared Burton | 3 | 2 | 2.18 | 64 | 0 | 5 | 62.0 | 21 | 15 | 16 | 55 |
| Drew Butera | 0 | 0 | 0.00 | 1 | 0 | 0 | 1.0 | 0 | 0 | 1 | 1 |
| Matt Capps | 1 | 4 | 3.68 | 30 | 0 | 14 | 29.1 | 13 | 12 | 4 | 18 |
| Sam Deduno | 6 | 5 | 4.44 | 15 | 15 | 0 | 79.0 | 40 | 39 | 53 | 57 |
| Cole De Vries | 5 | 5 | 4.11 | 17 | 16 | 0 | 87.2 | 48 | 40 | 18 | 58 |
| Scott Diamond | 12 | 9 | 3.54 | 27 | 27 | 0 | 173.0 | 76 | 68 | 31 | 90 |
| Brian Duensing | 4 | 12 | 5.12 | 55 | 11 | 0 | 109.0 | 71 | 62 | 27 | 69 |
| Casey Fien | 2 | 1 | 2.06 | 35 | 0 | 0 | 35.0 | 9 | 8 | 9 | 32 |
| Jeff Gray | 6 | 1 | 5.71 | 49 | 0 | 0 | 52.0 | 34 | 33 | 22 | 26 |
| Liam Hendriks | 1 | 8 | 5.59 | 16 | 16 | 0 | 85.1 | 61 | 53 | 26 | 50 |
| Francisco Liriano | 3 | 10 | 5.31 | 22 | 17 | 0 | 100.0 | 63 | 59 | 55 | 109 |
| Matt Maloney | 1 | 0 | 8.18 | 9 | 0 | 0 | 11.0 | 10 | 10 | 1 | 5 |
| Jeff Manship | 0 | 0 | 7.89 | 12 | 0 | 0 | 21.2 | 19 | 19 | 7 | 12 |
| Jason Marquis | 2 | 4 | 8.47 | 7 | 7 | 0 | 34.0 | 33 | 32 | 14 | 12 |
| Lester Oliveros | 0 | 0 | 5.40 | 1 | 0 | 0 | 1.2 | 1 | 1 | 1 | 1 |
| Carl Pavano | 2 | 5 | 6.00 | 11 | 11 | 0 | 63.0 | 46 | 42 | 8 | 33 |
| Luis Perdomo | 0 | 0 | 3.18 | 15 | 0 | 0 | 17.0 | 8 | 6 | 12 | 8 |
| Glen Perkins | 3 | 1 | 2.56 | 70 | 0 | 15 | 70.1 | 25 | 20 | 16 | 78 |
| Tyler Robertson | 2 | 2 | 5.40 | 40 | 0 | 0 | 25.0 | 16 | 15 | 14 | 26 |
| Anthony Swarzak | 3 | 6 | 5.03 | 44 | 5 | 0 | 96.2 | 57 | 54 | 31 | 62 |
| Esmerling Vásquez | 0 | 2 | 5.68 | 6 | 6 | 0 | 31.2 | 20 | 20 | 19 | 14 |
| Kyle Waldrop | 0 | 1 | 2.53 | 17 | 0 | 0 | 21.1 | 6 | 6 | 6 | 7 |
| P. J. Walters | 2 | 5 | 5.69 | 12 | 12 | 0 | 61.2 | 41 | 39 | 22 | 42 |
| Team Totals | 66 | 96 | 4.77 | 162 | 162 | 35 | 1438.2 | 832 | 762 | 465 | 943 |

== Other post-season awards ==
- Calvin R. Griffith Award (Most Valuable Twin) – Josh Willingham
- Joseph W. Haynes Award (Twins Pitcher of the Year) – Scott Diamond
- Bill Boni Award (Twins Outstanding Rookie) – Scott Diamond
- Jim Kaat Award (Defensive Player of the Year) – Ben Revere
- Charles O. Johnson Award (Most Improved Twin) – Ben Revere
- Dick Siebert Award (Upper Midwest Player of the Year) – Joe Mauer
- Bob Allison Award (Leadership Award) – Justin Morneau
- Mike Augustin Award ("Media Good Guy" Award) – Glen Perkins
  - The above awards are voted on by the Twin Cities chapter of the BBWAA
- Carl R. Pohlad Award (Outstanding Community Service) – Denard Span
- Sherry Robertson Award (Twins Outstanding Farm System Position Player) – Oswaldo Arcia
- Jim Rantz Award (Twins Outstanding Farm System Pitcher) – B. J. Hermsen
- Kirby Puckett Award (Alumni Community Service) – Roy Smalley
- Herb Carneal Award (Lifetime Achievement Award) – Jim Rantz

== Farm system ==
| Level | Team | League | Manager |
|---|---|---|---|
| AAA | Rochester Red Wings | International League | Gene Glynn |
| AA | New Britain Rock Cats | Eastern League | Jeff Smith |
| A | Fort Myers Miracle | Florida State League | Jake Mauer |
| A | Beloit Snappers | Midwest League | Nelson Prada |
| Rookie | Elizabethton Twins | Appalachian League | Ray Smith |
| Rookie | GCL Twins | Gulf Coast League | Ramon Borrego |

LEAGUE CHAMPIONS: Elizabethton
