= 2012 Texas Rangers season =

2012 Texas Rangers
- American League Wild Card winners
- Cap insignia for the 2012 Texas Rangers
- League: American League
- Division: West
- Ballpark: Rangers Ballpark in Arlington
- City: Arlington, Texas
- Record: 93–69 (.574)
- Divisional place: 2nd
- Owners: Rangers Baseball Express (Nolan Ryan, Ray Davis and Bob R. Simpson)
- General managers: Jon Daniels
- Managers: Ron Washington
- Television: Fox Sports Southwest; KTXA (Steve Busby, Tom Grieve)
- Radio: KESN ESPN Radio 103.3 FM (English) (Eric Nadel, Matt Hicks, Bryan Dolgin); KZMP 1540 AM (Spanish) (Eleno Orlenas, Jerry Romo)
- Stats: ESPN.com; Baseball Reference

The 2012 Texas Rangers season was the 52nd season in the overall history of the franchise and the 41st since the team relocated to Arlington, Texas. The Rangers entered the season as the two-time defending champions of the American League and the American League West. They led the division for most of the season and had a 6.5-game lead on August 12, but faltered down the stretch. They finished 93–69, but were swept in the last series of the season by the Oakland Athletics and wound up second to the Athletics in the division. They then lost to the Baltimore Orioles in the ALWC Game and were eliminated from the playoffs.

== Offseason ==
=== Transactions ===
- October 31, 2011: The team exercised its club options on Colby Lewis and Yoshinori Tateyama, while also announcing that the entire coaching staff would return for 2012.
- November 2, 2011: RHP Darren O'Day was claimed on waivers by the Baltimore Orioles
- November 21, 2011: The club signed RHP Joe Nathan to a two-year $14.5 million deal with an option for a third year. He will be the team's closer and subsequently bump RHP Neftalí Feliz into the starting rotation. Nathan leaves the Minnesota Twins after becoming the all-time saves leader for the franchise over nine seasons with the club.
- December 1, 2011: Taylor Teagarden was traded to the Baltimore Orioles for minor league RHP Randy Henry and a player to be named later. On December 8, 2011, the player was identified as minor league 2B Greg Miclat.
- December 19, 2011: The team won the negotiating rights to Japanese RHP Yu Darvish for $51.7 million through the Posting system. The Rangers will have 30 days to negotiate a contract with Darvish, if no agreement is reached, then the posting fee is returned to the club and Darvish will return to the Hokkaido Nippon-Ham Fighters for the 2012 season.
- December 21, 2011: C Luis Martinez acquired from the San Diego Padres for minor league RHP Ryan Kelly. Martinez will be put on the 40-man roster.
- January 5, 2012: The Rangers traded infielder Chad Tracy to the Colorado Rockies in exchange for RHP Greg Reynolds. Reynolds was assigned to Triple A Round Rock.
- January 18, 2012: The Rangers and Japanese RHP Yu Darvish agreed on a six-year, $60 million contract. The contract was signed 15 minutes before a 4:00pm CST deadline. Yu was formally introduced to the organization with a press conference on January 20.

=== Roster ===
2012 Texas Rangers
Roster
Pitchers: 37 Mike Adams; 11 Yu Darvish; 46 Ryan Dempster; 39 Scott Feldman; 30 Neftalí Feliz; 53 Wilmer Font; 51 Justin Grimm; 54 Matt Harrison; 45 Derek Holland; 44,50 Michael Kirkman; 48 Colby Lewis; 57 Mark Lowe; 36 Joe Nathan; 41 Alexi Ogando; 44 Roy Oswalt; 33 Martín Pérez; 46,28 Robbie Ross; 52 Tanner Scheppers; 22 Yoshinori Tateyama; 19 Koji Uehara	Catchers: 15 Luis Martinez; 25 Mike Napoli; 8 Geovany Soto; 8 Yorvit Torrealba; Infielders: 1 Elvis Andrus; 29 Adrián Beltré; 14 Alberto González; 3 Luis Hernández; 5 Ian Kinsler; 18 Mitch Moreland; 9 Mike Olt; 2 Jurickson Profar; 21 Brandon Snyder; 10 Mike Young; Outfielders: 32 Josh Hamilton; 17 Nelson Cruz; 23 Craig Gentry; 27 Leonys Martín; 7 David Murphy	Manager: 38 Ron Washington; Coaches: 16 Dave Anderson (third base); 12 Scott Coolbaugh (hitting); 66 Josh Frasier (bullpen catcher); 40 Andy Hawkins (bullpen); 31 Mike Maddux (pitching); 4 Jackie Moore (bench); 24 Gary Pettis (first base)

== Player stats ==
=== Batting ===
Note: G = Games played; AB = At bats; R = Runs; H = Hits; 2B = Doubles; 3B = Triples; HR = Home runs; RBI = Runs batted in; SB = Stolen bases; BB = Walks; AVG = Batting average; SLG = Slugging average

Player	G	AB	R	H	2B	3B	HR	RBI	SB	BB	AVG	SLG
Ian Kinsler	157	655	105	168	42	5	19	72	21	60	.256	.423
Elvis Andrus	158	629	85	180	31	9	3	62	21	57	.286	.378
Michael Young	156	611	79	169	27	3	8	67	2	33	.277	.370
Adrián Beltré	156	604	95	194	33	2	36	102	1	36	.321	.561
Nelson Cruz	159	585	86	152	45	0	24	90	8	48	.260	.460
Josh Hamilton	148	562	103	160	31	2	43	128	7	60	.285	.577
David Murphy	147	457	65	139	29	3	15	61	10	54	.304	.479
Mike Napoli	108	352	53	80	9	2	24	56	1	56	.227	.469
Mitch Moreland	114	327	41	90	18	0	15	50	1	23	.275	.468
Craig Gentry	121	240	31	73	12	3	1	26	13	14	.304	.392
Yorvit Torrealba	49	161	16	38	8	0	3	12	1	14	.236	.342
Geovany Soto	47	148	19	29	6	0	5	25	1	11	.196	.338
Brandon Snyder	40	65	11	18	2	0	3	9	0	3	.277	.446
Alberto González	24	54	7	13	2	1	0	4	0	0	.241	.315
Leonys Martín	24	46	6	8	5	2	0	6	3	4	.174	.370
Mike Olt	16	33	2	5	1	0	0	5	1	5	.152	.182
Luis Martinez	10	18	1	2	0	0	0	0	0	0	.111	.111
Jurickson Profar	9	17	2	3	2	0	1	2	0	0	.176	.471
Luis Hernández	2	2	0	0	0	0	0	0	0	0	.000	.000
Pitcher totals	162	24	1	5	0	0	0	3	0	0	.208	.208
Team totals	162	5590	808	1526	303	32	200	780	91	478	.273	.446

=== Pitching ===
Note: W = Wins; L = Losses; ERA = Earned run average; G = Games pitched; GS = Games started; SV = Saves; IP = Innings pitched; H = Hits allowed; R = Runs allowed; ER = Earned runs allowed; BB = Walks allowed; SO = Strikeouts

Player	W	L	ERA	G	GS	SV	IP	H	R	ER	BB	SO
Matt Harrison	18	11	3.29	32	32	0	213.1	210	82	78	59	133
Yu Darvish	16	9	3.90	29	29	0	191.1	156	89	83	89	221
Derek Holland	12	7	4.67	29	27	0	175.1	162	100	91	52	145
Scott Feldman	6	11	5.09	29	21	0	123.2	139	79	70	32	96
Colby Lewis	6	6	3.43	16	16	0	105.0	99	48	40	14	93
Ryan Dempster	7	3	5.09	12	12	0	69.0	74	43	39	25	70
Alexi Ogando	2	0	3.27	58	1	3	66.0	49	26	24	17	66
Robbie Ross Jr.	6	0	2.22	58	0	0	65.0	55	21	16	23	47
Joe Nathan	3	5	2.80	66	0	37	64.1	55	23	20	13	78
Roy Oswalt	4	3	5.80	17	9	0	59.0	79	41	38	11	59
Mike Adams	5	3	3.27	61	0	1	52.1	56	21	19	17	45
Neftalí Feliz	3	1	3.16	8	7	0	42.2	28	15	15	13	28
Mark Lowe	0	2	3.43	36	0	0	39.1	35	15	15	13	28
Martín Pérez	1	4	5.45	12	6	0	38.0	47	26	23	15	25
Koji Uehara	0	0	1.75	37	0	1	36.0	20	7	7	3	43
Michael Kirkman	1	2	3.82	28	0	0	35.1	24	16	15	17	38
Tanner Scheppers	1	1	4.45	39	0	1	32.1	47	18	16	9	30
Yoshinori Tateyama	1	0	9.00	14	0	0	17.0	18	19	17	6	18
Justin Grimm	1	1	9.00	5	2	0	14.0	22	14	14	3	13
Wilmer Font	0	0	9.00	3	0	0	2.0	0	2	2	4	1
Craig Gentry	0	0	18.00	1	0	0	1.0	3	2	2	1	0
Team totals	93	69	3.99	162	162	43	1442.0	1378	707	639	446	1286

=== American League West ===
AL West
Team	W	L	Pct.	GB	Home	Road
Oakland Athletics	94	68	.580	—	50‍–‍31	44‍–‍37
Texas Rangers	93	69	.574	1	50‍–‍31	43‍–‍38
Los Angeles Angels of Anaheim	89	73	.549	5	46‍–‍35	43‍–‍38
Seattle Mariners	75	87	.463	19	40‍–‍41	35‍–‍46

=== American League Wild Card ===
Division winners
Team	W	L	Pct.
New York Yankees	95	67	.586
Oakland Athletics	94	68	.580
Detroit Tigers	88	74	.543

Wild Card teams (Top 2 teams qualify for postseason)
Team	W	L	Pct.	GB
Texas Rangers	93	69	.574	—
Baltimore Orioles	93	69	.574	—
Tampa Bay Rays	90	72	.556	3
Los Angeles Angels of Anaheim	89	73	.549	4
Chicago White Sox	85	77	.525	8
Seattle Mariners	75	87	.463	18
Toronto Blue Jays	73	89	.451	20
Kansas City Royals	72	90	.444	21
Boston Red Sox	69	93	.426	24
Cleveland Indians	68	94	.420	25
Minnesota Twins	66	96	.407	27

== Record vs. opponents ==
2012 American League record Source: MLB Standings Grid – 2012
Team	BAL	BOS	CWS	CLE	DET	KC	LAA	MIN	NYY	OAK	SEA	TB	TEX	TOR	NL
Baltimore	–	13–5	6–2	4–4	3–3	5–4	2–7	5–2	9–9	4–5	8–1	10–8	2–5	11–7	11–7
Boston	5–13	–	6–2	5–3	5–5	4–3	0–6	4–3	5–13	1–8	5–4	9–9	2–6	7–11	11–7
Chicago	2–6	2–6	–	11–7	6–12	6–12	3–5	14–4	5–2	3–3	8–1	4–3	6–3	6–4	9–9
Cleveland	4–4	3–5	7–11	–	10–8	8–10	5–4	6–12	1–5	2–8	4–4	4–4	4–5	2–4	8–10
Detroit	3–3	5–5	12–6	8–10	–	13–5	5–5	10–8	4–6	4–3	1–5	5–2	3–7	4–2	11–7
Kansas City	4–5	3–4	12–6	10–8	5–13	–	4–5	7–11	3–4	5–4	1–7	4–2	4–5	2–6	8–10
Los Angeles	7–2	6–0	5–3	4–5	5–5	5–4	–	6–3	4–5	9–10	11–8	1–9	10–9	4–4	12–6
Minnesota	2–5	3–4	4–14	12–6	8–10	11–7	3–6	–	3–4	4–5	2–8	1–5	2–8	2–5	9–9
New York	9–9	13–5	2–5	5–1	6–4	4–3	5–4	4–3	–	5–5	6–3	8–10	4–3	11–7	13–5
Oakland	5–4	8–1	3–3	8–2	3–4	4–5	10–9	5–4	5–5	–	12–7	5–4	11–8	5–4	10–8
Seattle	1–8	4–5	1–8	4–4	5–1	7–1	8–11	8–2	3–6	7–12	–	4–6	9–10	6–3	8–10
Tampa Bay	8–10	9–9	3–4	4–4	2–5	2–4	9–1	5–1	10–8	4–5	6–4	–	5–4	14–4	9–9
Texas	5–2	6–2	3–6	5–4	7–3	5–4	9–10	8–2	3–4	8–11	10–9	4–5	–	6–3	14–4
Toronto	7–11	11–7	4–6	4–2	2–4	6–2	4–4	5–2	7–11	4–5	3–6	4–14	3–6	–	9–9

- Source: MLB Standings Grid – 2012

=== Game log ===
Legend
Rangers Win	Rangers Loss	Game postponed

2012 Game Log (93–69)
April (17–6)

#	Date	Opponent	Score	Win	Loss	Save	Attendance	Record
1	April 6	White Sox	3–2	Lewis (1–0)	Danks (0–1)	Nathan (1)	49,085	1–0
2	April 7	White Sox	4–3	Thornton (1–0)	Nathan (0–1)	Santiago (1)	47,867	1–1
3	April 8	White Sox	5–0	Harrison (1–0)	Floyd (0–1)		45,368	2–1
4	April 9	Mariners	11–5	Darvish (1–0)	Noesí (0–1)		43,002	3–1
5	April 10	Mariners	1–0	Feliz (1–0)	Beavan (0–1)	Nathan (2)	25,753	4–1
6	April 11	Mariners	4–3	Luetge (1–0)	Nathan (0–2)	League (3)	32,342	4–2
7	April 12	Mariners	5–3	Holland (1–0)	Vargas (1–1)	Adams (1)	31,513	5–2
8	April 13	@ Twins	4–1	Harrison (2–0)	Swarzak (0–2)	Ogando (1)	31,400	6–2
9	April 14	@ Twins	6–2	Ross (1–0)	Duensing (0–1)		35,854	7–2
10	April 15	@ Twins	4–3	Ross (2–0)	Perkins (0–1)	Nathan (3)	32,093	8–2
11	April 17	@ Red Sox	18–3	Lewis (2–0)	Lester (0–2)		38,229	9–2
12	April 18	@ Red Sox	6–3	Holland (2–0)	Beckett (1–2)		37,967	10–2
13	April 19	@ Tigers	10–3	Darvish (2–0)	Wilk (0-2)		30,029	11-2
	April 20	@ Tigers	Postponed (rain); Makeup: April 21 as part of a doubleheader					
14	April 21	@ Tigers	10–4	Harrison (3–0)	Porcello (1–1)		41,427	12–2
15	April 21	@ Tigers	3–2	Verlander (2–1)	Feliz (1–1)	Valverde (4)	35,001	12–3
16	April 22	@ Tigers	3–2 (11)	Ross (3–0)	Weber (0–1)	Nathan (4)	36,255	13–3
17	April 23	Yankees	7–4	Sabathia (2–0)	Holland (2–1)	Rivera (4)	48,234	13–4
18	April 24	Yankees	2–0	Darvish (3–0)	Kuroda (1–3)	Nathan (5)	47,085	14–4
19	April 25	Yankees	7–3	Ross (4–0)	Hughes (1–3)		47,942	15–4
20	April 27	Rays	8–4	Shields (4–0)	Harrison (3–1)		47,496	15–5
21	April 28	Rays	7–2	Lewis (3–0)	Niemann (1–3)		49,197	16–5
22	April 29	Rays	5–2	Price (4–1)	Holland (2–2)	Rodney (7)	43,475	16–6
23	April 30	@ Blue Jays	4–1	Darvish (4–0)	Drabek (2–2)	Nathan (6)	21,945	17–6

May (14–14)

#	Date	Opponent	Score	Win	Loss	Save	Attendance	Record
24	May 1	@ Blue Jays	8–7	Cordero (1–1)	Adams (0–1)		18,774	17–7
25	May 2	@ Blue Jays	11–5	Romero (4–0)	Harrison (3–2)		25,123	17–8
26	May 4	@ Indians	6–3	Gómez (2–1)	Lewis (3–1)	Perez (10)	16,147	17–9
27	May 5	@ Indians	5–2 (11)	Ogando (1–0)	Smith (1–1)	Nathan (7)	21,307	18–9
28	May 6	@ Indians	4–2	Jiménez (3–2)	Darvish (4–1)	Perez (11)	18,171	18–10
29	May 7	@ Orioles	14–3	Harrison (4–2)	Matusz (1–4)		11,938	19–10
30	May 8	@ Orioles	10–3	Feliz (2–1)	Arrieta (2–3)		11,263	20–10
	May 9	@ Orioles	Postponed (rain); Makeup: May 10 as part of a doubleheader					
31	May 10	@ Orioles	6–5	Chen (3–0)	Lewis (3–2)	Johnson (9)		20–11
32	May 10	@ Orioles	7–3	Holland (3–2)	Hunter (2–2)		19,250	21–11
33	May 11	Angels	10–3	Darvish (5–1)	Wilson (4–3)		48,201	22–11
34	May 12	Angels	4–2	Carpenter (1–1)	Harrison (4–3)	Downs (3)	47,699	22–12
35	May 13	Angels	13–6	Feliz (3–1)	Weaver (5–1)		46,669	23–12
36	May 14	Royals	3–1	Chen (2–4)	Feldman (0–1)	Broxton (8)	38,702	23–13
37	May 15	Royals	7–4	Mazzaro (1–0)	Lewis (3–3)		37,210	23–14
38	May 16	Athletics	4–1	Darvish (6–1)	Milone (5–3)	Nathan (8)	46,370	24–14
39	May 17	Athletics	5–4 (10)	Cook (1–0)	Adams (0–2)	Fuentes (3)	47,182	24–15
40	May 18	@ Astros	4–1	Ross (5–0)	Rodríguez (3–4)	Nathan (9)	34,715	25–15
41	May 19	@ Astros	6–5	Harrell (3–3)	Holland (3–3)	Myers (10)	42,673	25–16
42	May 20	@ Astros	6–1	Lewis (4–3)	Lyles (0–1)		35,873	26–16
43	May 21	@ Mariners	6–1	Hernández (4–3)	Darvish (6–2)		18,672	26–17
44	May 22	@ Mariners	3–1	Harrison (5–3)	Noesí (2–5)	Nathan (10)	15,604	27–17
45	May 23	@ Mariners	5–3	Millwood (3–4)	Feldman (0–2)	League (9)	23,097	27–18
46	May 25	Blue Jays	14–3	Holland (4–3)	Morrow (5–3)		46,789	28–18
47	May 26	Blue Jays	8–7 (13)	Tateyama (1–0)	Frasor (0–1)		47,430	29–18
48	May 27	Blue Jays	12–6	Darvish (7–2)	Drabek (4–5)		46,637	30–18
49	May 28	Mariners	4–2	Harrison (6–3)	Delabar (1–1)	Nathan (11)	41,384	31–18
50	May 29	Mariners	10–3	Vargas (6–4)	Feldman (0–3)		34,531	31–19
51	May 30	Mariners	21–8	Beavan (3–4)	Holland (4–4)	Iwakuma (1)	43,580	31-20

June (19–9)

#	Date	Opponent	Score	Win	Loss	Save	Attendance	Record
52	June 1	@ Angels	4–2	Williams (6–2)	Lewis (4–4)	Frieri (3)	40,080	31–21
53	June 2	@ Angels	3–2	Cassevah (1–0)	Darvish (7–3)	Frieri (4)	44,227	31–22
54	June 3	@ Angels	7–3	Harrison (7–3)	Haren (3–6)		42,465	32–22
55	June 4	@ Athletics	12–1	Parker (2–2)	Feldman (0–4)		10,120	32–23
56	June 5	@ Athletics	6–3	Holland (5–4)	Blackley (0–1)	Nathan (12)	11,861	33–23
57	June 6	@ Athletics	2–0	Colón (5–6)	Lewis (4–5)	Fuentes (5)	15,044	33–24
58	June 7	@ Athletics	7–1	McCarthy (5–3)	Darvish (7–4)		14,779	33–25
59	June 8	@ Giants	5–0	Harrison (8–3)	Zito (5–3)		41,163	34–25
60	June 9	@ Giants	5–2	Vogelsong (5–2)	Feldman (0–5)	Casilla (16)	41,704	34–26
61	June 10	@ Giants	5–0	Ross (6–0)	Lincecum (2–7)		42,418	35–26
62	June 12	Diamondbacks	9–1	Lewis (5–5)	Kennedy (5–6)		39,140	36–26
63	June 13	Diamondbacks	1–0	Adams (1–2)	Miley (7–3)	Nathan (13)	45,866	37–26
64	June 14	Diamondbacks	11–3	Hudson (3–1)	Feldman (0–6)		40,855	37–27
65	June 15	Astros	6–2	Darvish (8–4)	Lyles (1–3)		47,430	38–27
66	June 16	Astros	8–3	Grimm (1–0)	Harrell (6–5)		48,288	39–27
67	June 17	Astros	9–3	Lewis (6–5)	Rodriguez (1–7)		46,320	40–27
68	June 18	@ Padres	2–1	Harrison (9–3)	Marquis (3–6)	Nathan (14)	29,315	41–27
69	June 19	@ Padres	7–3	Feldman (1–6)	Vólquez (3–7)		25,889	42–27
70	June 20	@ Padres	4–2	Darvish (9–4)	Thayer (0–2)	Nathan (15)	23,942	43–27
71	June 22	Rockies	4–1	Oswalt (1–0)	Friedrich (4–4)	Nathan (16)	46,964	44–27
72	June 23	Rockies	11–7	Brothers (3–2)	Lewis (6–6)		42,516	44–28
73	June 24	Rockies	4–2	Harrison (10–3)	White (2–6)		45,407	45–28
74	June 25	Tigers	8–2	Porcello (5–5)	Grimm (1–1)		36,920	45–29
75	June 26	Tigers	7–5	Darvish (10–4)	Smyly (2–3)	Nathan (17)	39,561	46–29
76	June 27	Tigers	13–9	Oswalt (2–0)	Fister (1–5)		43,379	47–29
77	June 28	Athletics	7–6	Feldman (2–6)	Ross (2–8)	Nathan (18)	33,927	48–29
78	June 29	Athletics	4–3	Harrison (11–3)	Balfour (1–2)	Scheppers (1)	46,013	49–29
79	June 30	Athletics	7–2	Pérez (1–0)	Milone (8–6)		46,711	50–29

July (9–14)

#	Date	Opponent	Score	Win	Loss	Save	Attendance	Record
80	July 1	Athletics	3–1	Blackley (2–2)	Darvish (10–5)	Cook (7)	45,741	50–30
81	July 3	@ White Sox	19–2	Sale (10–2)	Oswalt (2–1)		30,183	50–31
82	July 4	@ White Sox	5–4 (10)	Reed (2–1)	Adams (1–3)		30,271	50–32
83	July 5	@ White Sox	2–1	Quintana (4–1)	Harrison (11–4)	Reed (12)	21,288	50–33
84	July 6	Twins	5–1	Liriano (3–7)	Pérez (1–1)		47,240	50–34
85	July 7	Twins	4–3 (10)	Nathan (1–2)	Waldrop (0–1)		47,067	51–34
86	July 8	Twins	4–3 (13)	Feldman (3–6)	Burnett (2–2)		43,268	52–34
87	July 13	@ Mariners	3–2	Holland (6–4)	Millwood (3–7)	Nathan (19)	23,721	53–34
88	July 14	@ Mariners	7–0	Hernández (7–5)	Darvish (10–6)		29,951	53–35
89	July 15	@ Mariners	4–0	Harrison (12–4)	Iwakuma (1–2)		27,378	54–35
90	July 17	@ Athletics	6–1	Oswalt (3–1)	Colón (6–8)		15,115	55–35
91	July 18	@ Athletics	4–3	Cook (3–2)	Kirkman (0–1)		20,249	55–36
92	July 20	@ Angels	6–1	Weaver (12–1)	Holland (6–5)		43,936	55–37
93	July 21	@ Angels	9–2	Darvish (11–6)	Santana (4–10)		39,086	56–37
94	July 22	@ Angels	7–4	Haren (7–8)	Harrison (12–5)		42,160	56–38
95	July 23	Red Sox	9–1	Feldman (4–6)	Doubront (10–5)		44,132	57–38
96	July 24	Red Sox	2–1	Padilla (4–0)	Nathan (1–3)	Aceves (21)	41,237	57–39
97	July 25	Red Sox	5–3	Holland (7–5)	Beckett (5–9)	Nathan (20)	44,104	58–39
98	July 27	White Sox	9–5	Sale (12–3)	Darvish (11–7)		47,638	58–40
99	July 28	White Sox	5–2	Humber (5–5)	Harrison (12–6)		47,580	58–41
100	July 29	White Sox	2–0	Feldman (5–6)	Floyd (8–9)	Nathan (21)	46,744	59–41
101	July 30	Angels	15–8	Santana (5–10)	Oswalt (3–2)	Williams (1)	36,111	59–42
102	July 31	Angels	6–2	Weaver (14–1)	Holland (7–6)		34,918	59–43

August (19–10)

#	Date	Opponent	Score	Win	Loss	Save	Attendance	Record
103	August 1	Angels	11–10 (10)	Nathan (2–3)	Isringhausen (3–1)		42,832	60–43
104	August 2	Angels	15–9	Oswalt (4–2)	Carpenter (1–2)		40,281	61–43
105	August 3	@ Royals	5–3	Harrison (13–6)	Guthrie (3–12)	Ogando (2)	26,889	62–43
106	August 4	@ Royals	4–2	Feldman (6–6)	Smith (2–4)	Ogando (3)	28,724	63–43
107	August 5	@ Royals	7–6 (10)	Holland (5–3)	Kirkman (0–2)		22,007	63–44
108	August 6	@ Red Sox	9–2	Cook (3–5)	Darvish (11–8)		37,316	63–45
109	August 7	@ Red Sox	6–3	Dempster (6–5)	Lester (5–10)	Nathan (22)	38,416	64–45
110	August 8	@ Red Sox	10–9	Ogando (2–0)	Mortensen (1–1)	Nathan (23)	37,716	65–45
111	August 10	Tigers	6–2	Scherzer (11–6)	Feldman (6–7)		47,255	65–46
112	August 11	Tigers	2–1	Adams (2–3)	Villarreal (3–3)		48,303	66–46
113	August 12	Tigers	8–3	Darvish (12–8)	Porcello (9–7)		45,752	67–46
114	August 13	@ Yankees	8–2	Phelps (3–3)	Dempster (6–6)	Lowe (1)	45,676	67–47
115	August 14	@ Yankees	3–0	Kuroda (11–8)	Harrison (13–7)		44,533	67–48
116	August 15	@ Yankees	3–2	García (7–5)	Feldman (6–8)	Soriano (29)	45,921	67–49
117	August 16	@ Yankees	10–6	Scheppers (1–0)	Logan (4–1)		47,645	68–49
118	August 17	@ Blue Jays	3–2	Happ (9–10)	Darvish (12–9)	Janssen (16)	26,816	68–50
119	August 18	@ Blue Jays	2–1	Kirkman (1–2)	Villanueva (6–3)	Nathan (24)	30,033	69–50
120	August 19	@ Blue Jays	11–2	Harrison (14–7)	Álvarez (7–11)		35,701	70–50
121	August 20	Orioles	5–1	Dempster (7–6)	González (5–3)		36,257	71–50
122	August 21	Orioles	5–3	Tillman (6–2)	Feldman (6–9)	Johnson (38)	32,146	71–51
123	August 22	Orioles	12–3	Holland (8–6)	Hunter (4–8)		40,714	72–51
124	August 23	Twins	10–6	Adams (3–3)	Burton (1–1)	Nathan (25)	33,762	73–51
125	August 24	Twins	8–0	Harrison (15–7)	Deduno (4–2)		45,823	74–51
126	August 25	Twins	9–3	Dempster (8–6)	Duensing (3–9)		44,215	75–51
127	August 26	Twins	6–5	De Vries (3–5)	Feldman (6–10)	Perkins (8)	37,785	75–52
128	August 27	Rays	6–5	Holland (9–6)	Price (16–5)	Nathan (26)	29,453	76–52
129	August 28	Rays	1–0	Darvish (13–9)	Shields (12–8)	Nathan (27)	30,700	77–52
130	August 29	Rays	8–4	McGee (5–2)	Harrison (15–8)		36,176	77–53
131	August 31	@ Indians	5–3	Dempster (9–6)	Jiménez (9–14)	Nathan (28)	16,700	78–53

September/October (15–16)

#	Date	Opponent	Score	Win	Loss	Save	Attendance	Record
132	September 1	@ Indians	4–3	Gómez (5–7)	Feldman (6–11)	Pestano (1)	17,218	78–54
133	September 2	@ Indians	8–3	Holland (10–6)	McAllister (5–6)		19,474	79–54
134	September 3	@ Royals	8–4	Darvish (14–9)	Chen (10–11)		22,207	80–54
135	September 4	@ Royals	6–3	Guthrie (7–12)	Harrison (15–9)	Holland (11)	12,462	80–55
136	September 5	@ Royals	7–6	Dempster (10–6)	Teaford (1–4)	Nathan (29)	13,354	81–55
137	September 6	@ Royals	5–4 (10)	Adams (4–3)	Holland (6–4)	Nathan (30)	15,332	82–55
138	September 7	@ Rays	3–1 (11)	Davis (3–0)	Lowe (0–1)		19,545	82–56
139	September 8	@ Rays	4–2 (10)	Adams (5–3)	Farnsworth (1–4)	Nathan (31)	18,702	83–56
140	September 9	@ Rays	6–0	Shields (14–8)	Oswalt (4–3)		20,522	83–57
141	September 11	Indians	6–4	Harrison (16–9)	Jiménez (9–16)	Nathan (32)	34,765	84–57
142	September 12	Indians	5–2	Dempster (11–6)	Gómez (5–8)	Nathan (33)	36,001	85–57
143	September 13	Indians	5–4	Maine (2–1)	Nathan (2–4)	Perez (36)	36,102	85–58
144	September 14	Mariners	9–3	Darvish (15–9)	Iwakuma (6–5)		45,075	86–58
145	September 15	Mariners	8–6	Luetge (2–1)	Scheppers (1–1)	Wilhelmsen (27)	47,267	86–59
146	September 16	Mariners	2–1	Harrison (17–9)	Beavan (9–10)	Uehara (1)	45,928	87–59
147	September 18	@ Angels	11–3	Weaver (18–4)	Dempster (11–7)		36,948	87–60
148	September 19	@ Angels	6–2	Holland (11–6)	Wilson (12–10)		37,093	88–60
149	September 20	@ Angels	3–1	Darvish (16–9)	Frieri (4–2)	Nathan (34)	38,205	89–60
150	September 21	@ Mariners	6–3	Iwakuma (7–5)	Pérez (1–2)	Wilhelmsen (28)	17,893	89–61
151	September 22	@ Mariners	1–0	Beavan (10–10)	Harrison (17–10)	Wilhelmsen (29)	17,671	89–62
152	September 23	@ Mariners	3–2	Dempster (12–7)	Vargas (14–11)	Nathan (35)	19,024	90–62
153	September 24	Athletics	5–4	Nathan (3–4)	Ross (2–11)		43,044	91–62
154	September 25	Athletics	3–2 (10)	Scribner (1–0)	Lowe (0–2)	Balfour (21)	43,874	91–63
155	September 26	Athletics	9–3	Parker (12–8)	Pérez (1–3)		46,689	91–64
156	September 27	Athletics	9–7	Harrison (18–10)	Blackley (5–4)	Nathan (36)	43,796	92–64
157	September 28	Angels	7–4	Weaver (20–4)	Dempster (12–8)	Frieri (22)	46,662	92–65
	September 29	Angels	Postponed (rain); Makeup: September 30 as part of a doubleheader					
158	September 30	Angels	5–4	Richards (4–3)	Nathan (3–5)	Frieri (23)	46,713	92–66
159	September 30	Angels	8–7	Holland (12–6)	Santana (9–13)	Nathan (37)	48,089	93–66
160	October 1	@ Athletics	4–3	Parker (13–8)	Pérez (1–4)	Balfour (23)	21,162	93–67
161	October 2	@ Athletics	3–1	Blackley (6–4)	Harrison (18–11)	Balfour (24)	30,660	93–68
162	October 3	@ Athletics	12–5	Scribner (2–0)	Holland (12–7)		36,067	93–69

== Postseason ==
=== Wild Card Game ===
Team	1	2	3	4	5	6	7	8	9	R	H	E
Baltimore Orioles	1	0	0	0	0	1	1	0	2	5	8	2
Texas Rangers	1	0	0	0	0	0	0	0	0	1	9	2
Starting pitchers: BAL: Joe Saunders; TEX: Yu Darvish --> WP: Joe Saunders (1–0) LP: Yu Darvish (0–1)

== Farm system ==
Level	Team	League	Manager
AAA	Round Rock Express	Pacific Coast League	Bobby Jones
AA	Frisco RoughRiders	Texas League	Steve Buechele
A	Myrtle Beach Pelicans	Carolina League	Jason Wood
A	Hickory Crawdads	South Atlantic League	Bill Richardson
A-Short Season	Spokane Indians	Northwest League	Tim Hulett
Rookie	AZL Rangers	Arizona League	Corey Ragsdale

LEAGUE CHAMPIONS: AZL Rangers
