= Anthony Swarzak =

American baseball player (born 1985)

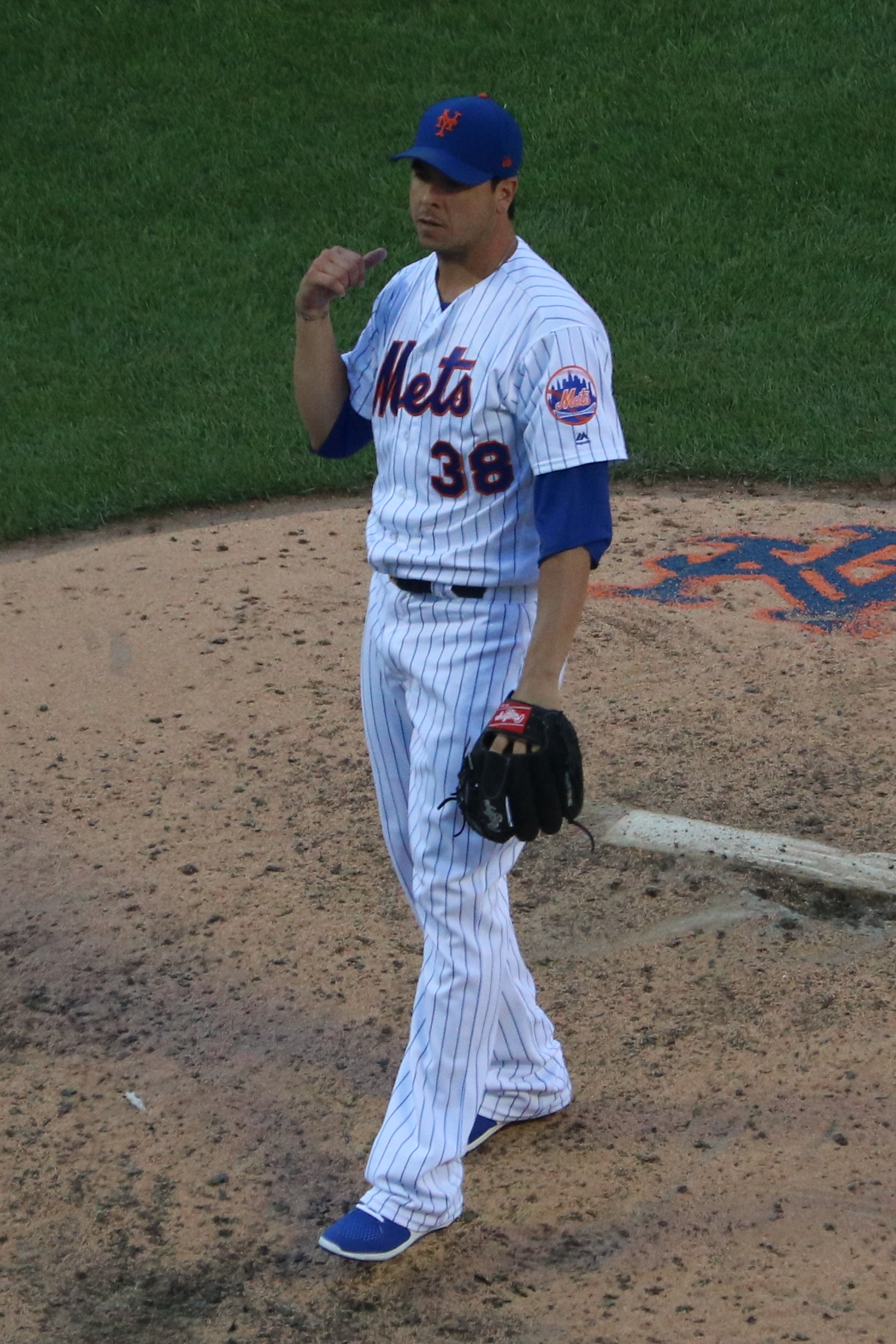
- Swarzak with the New York Mets in 2018
- Pitcher
- Born: September 10, 1985 (age 41); Fort Lauderdale, Florida, U.S.
- Batted: Right Threw: Right

Professional debut
- MLB: May 23, 2009, for the Minnesota Twins
- KBO: June 21, 2015, for the Doosan Bears

Last appearance
- MLB: July 10, 2021, for the Kansas City Royals
- KBO: October 4, 2015, for the Doosan Bears

MLB statistics
- Win–loss record: 26–37
- Earned run average: 4.42
- Strikeouts: 494

KBO statistics
- Win–loss record: 5–7
- Earned run average: 5.26
- Strikeouts: 72
- Stats at Baseball Reference

Teams
- Minnesota Twins (2009, 2011–2014); Cleveland Indians (2015); Doosan Bears (2015); New York Yankees (2016); Chicago White Sox (2017); Milwaukee Brewers (2017); New York Mets (2018); Seattle Mariners (2019); Atlanta Braves (2019); Arizona Diamondbacks (2021); Kansas City Royals (2021)

Career highlights and awards
- Korean Series champion (2015)

Anthony Ray Swarzak (born September 10, 1985) is an American former professional baseball pitcher. He played in Major League Baseball (MLB) for the Minnesota Twins, Cleveland Indians, New York Yankees, Chicago White Sox, Milwaukee Brewers, New York Mets, Seattle Mariners, Atlanta Braves, Arizona Diamondbacks, and Kansas City Royals. He also played in the KBO League for the Doosan Bears.

== Amateur career ==
Swarzak attended Nova High School in Davie, Florida. As a sophomore, Swarzak pitched to an 11–1 win–loss record with a 1.16 earned run average and 120 strikeouts and was named to the All-County team and second team All-State. In 2003, he finished 14–1 with 142 strikeouts. In his senior season, in which he went 14–2, with 147 strikeouts, Swarzak was named to the 2004 All-County and Class 5A All-State teams. He had committed to attend Louisiana State University (LSU) to play college baseball for the LSU Tigers, but instead chose to sign with the Twins on June 22, 2004, for a $575,000 bonus.

== Professional career ==
=== Minnesota Twins ===
The Minnesota Twins selected Swarzak in the second round, with the 61st overall selection, in the 2004 Major League Baseball draft. Swarzak was #15 on the Baseball America Top Gulf Coast League Prospects list in 2004. He was Midwest League Pitcher of the Week (from May 16–22, 2005), the Twins' Pitcher of the Month (May 2005), Midwest League All-Star, and #8 on the Baseball America Top Midwest League Prospects list in 2005. In 2006, he was Florida State League Pitcher of the Week (from August 7–14, 2006) and a FSL Post-Season All-Star.

Swarzak was one of the top rated prospects in the Twins' farm system before a fifty-game suspension for violation of Minor League drug policy on April 20, 2007, sidetracked his career. He tested positive for marijuana. After having started the season with the Double A New Britain Rock Cats, upon his reinstatement from the restricted list on June 11, he was reassigned to the Class A Advanced Fort Myers Miracle. After three games with Fort Myers, he returned to New Britain.

He began the 2008 season with the Rock Cats, and went 3–8 with a 5.67 earned run average. After a promotion to Triple-A, his record actually improved to 5–0 with a 1.80 ERA in seven starts. He was added to the Twins' 40 man roster, and spent his first spring with the Twins in 2009. Following Spring training, he was reassigned to Rochester. Swarzak suffered from a lack of run support in Rochester to start the season. Despite an ERA of 1.59 in his first three starts, his record stood at 0–3.

His record improved to 3–4 with a 2.25 ERA when he got the call to the majors on May 20. He filled in the starting rotation for the injured left-handed starter Glen Perkins.

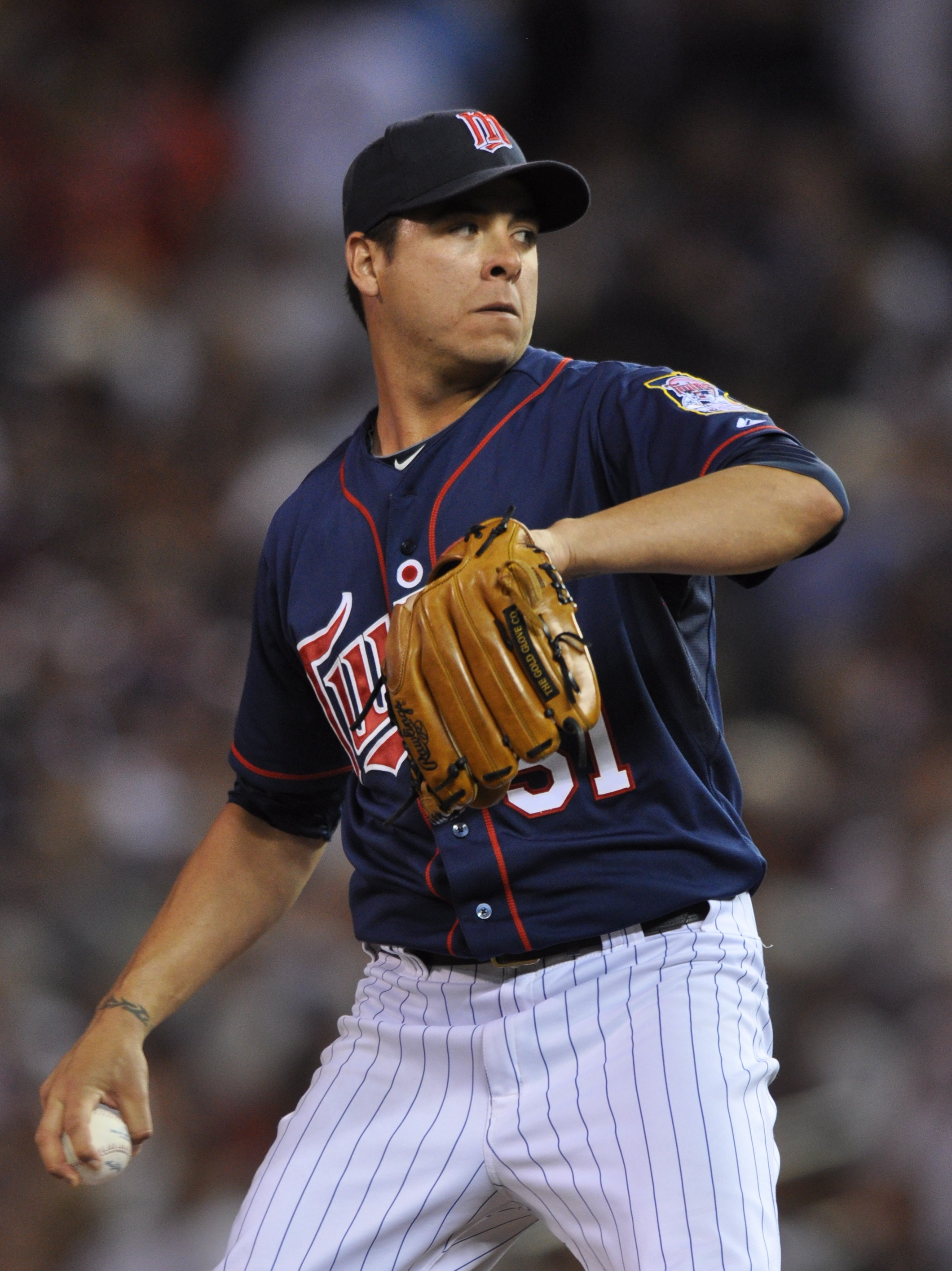
Swarzak pitching for the Minnesota Twins in 2012

Swarzak made his major league debut for the Twins on May 23, 2009, in a home game against the Milwaukee Brewers. He pitched seven shutout innings, giving up five hits and two walks while striking out three. The Twins won the game 6–2, earning Swarzak his first major league win.

After a line drive broke his foot, Swarzak's 2010 season was statistically awful as he spent the whole year in the minors. His ERA finished at 6.21 in Triple-A Rochester.

Swarzak rebounded in 2011, contributing both in long relief and in spot starts for the Twins. He pitched a total of 102 innings, going 4–7 in 27 games.

In 2012, Swarzak started five games for the Twins while making 39 appearances out of the bullpen, pitching to a collective 96 innings of work. Swarzak began 2013 on the disabled list with fractured left ribs he suffered while "wrestling around a little bit." He was activated on April 7 and used primarily as a long reliever for the rest of the season. In 48 games, he went 3–2 with a 2.91 ERA, striking out 69 in 96 innings.

On November 25, 2014, the Twins announced that Swarzak had been outrighted off the 40-man roster and elected free agency.

=== Cleveland Indians ===
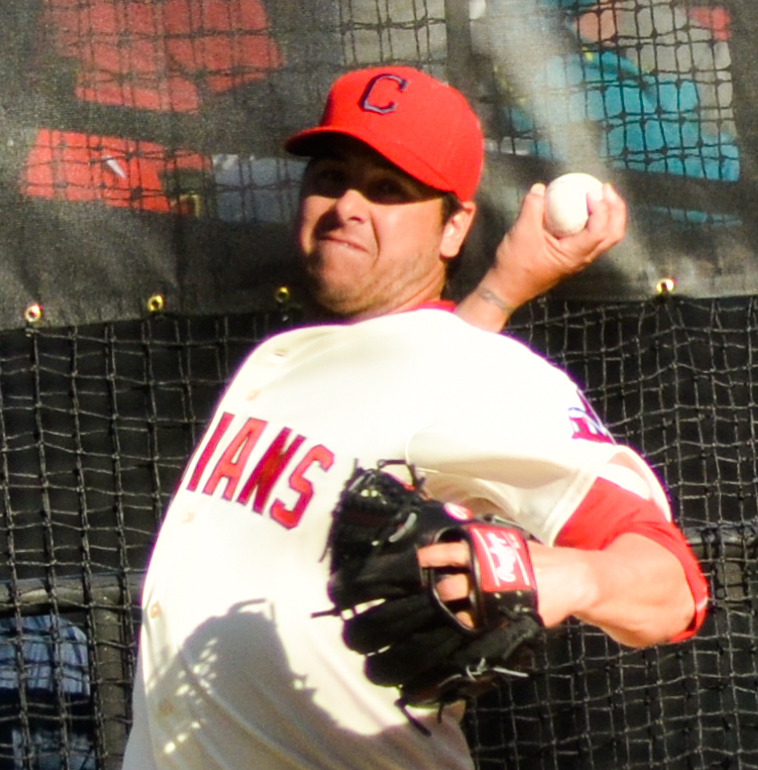
Swarzak with the 2015 Cleveland Indians

On January 15, 2015, Swarzak signed a minor league contract with the Cleveland Indians that included an invitation to Spring Training. On April 5, Swarzak was selected to the 40-man roster. On May 9, Swarzak was designated for assignment by the Indians after Bruce Chen was added to the roster. On June 16, Swarzak was released by the Indians.

=== Doosan Bears ===
On June 16, 2015, Swarzak signed with the Doosan Bears of the KBO League. Swarzak filled the foreign player roster spot formerly held by Yunesky Maya. He worked mainly as a starting pitcher in Korea and added a slider to his arsenal of pitches.

=== New York Yankees ===
Swarzak signed a minor league contract with the New York Yankees on February 5, 2016. He began the 2016 season with the Triple-A Scranton/Wilkes-Barre RailRiders, and was promoted to the major leagues on June 7. At the end of the season, Swarzak elected free agency over an assignment to Scranton/Wilkes-Barre.

=== Chicago White Sox ===
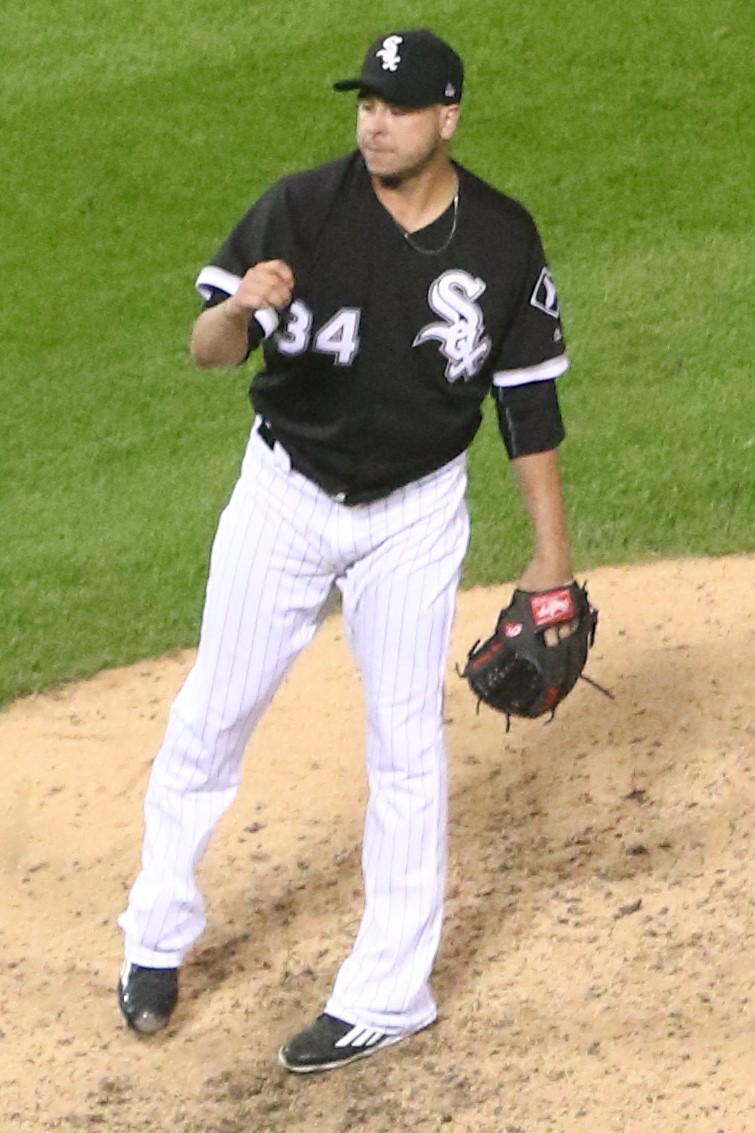
Swarzak with the 2017 Chicago White Sox

On January 23, 2017, Swarzak signed a minor league contract with the Chicago White Sox. Swarzak ended up having one of the best seasons of his career in Chicago. In 41 games with the White Sox, he posted a 2.23 ERA and a 1.034 WHIP.

=== Milwaukee Brewers ===
On July 25, 2017, Swarzak was traded by the Chicago White Sox to the Milwaukee Brewers for outfielder Ryan Cordell.

=== New York Mets ===
Swarzak signed a two-year contract with the New York Mets on December 15, 2017, worth over $14 million. On April 3, the Mets placed Swarzak on the disabled list with an oblique strain and recalled Hansel Robles. Swarzak was activated from the disabled list on June 5 after appearing in three rehab games with the Triple-A Las Vegas 51s.

=== Seattle Mariners ===
On December 3, 2018, the Mets traded Swarzak, Jay Bruce, Jarred Kelenic, Gerson Bautista, and Justin Dunn to the Seattle Mariners for Edwin Díaz, Robinson Canó, and $20 million. Swarzak missed spring training in 2019, as he was placed on the injured list in March 2019. Swarzak returned to the active roster on April 2, 2019.

=== Atlanta Braves ===
On May 20, 2019, Swarzak was traded to the Atlanta Braves in exchange for Arodys Vizcaíno and Jesse Biddle. He became a free agent following the 2019 season.

=== Philadelphia Phillies ===
On February 4, 2020, Swarzak signed a Minor League contract with the Philadelphia Phillies. He was released on July 20, 2020.

=== Arizona Diamondbacks ===
On March 4, 2021, Swarzak signed a minor league contract with the Arizona Diamondbacks organization that included an invitation to spring training. On April 7, 2021, Swarzak was selected to the 40-man roster to take the roster spot of fellow reliever Chris Devenski, who had been placed on the restricted list. Swarzak struggled to a 9.64 ERA in 6 games for the Diamondbacks before being designated for assignment on April 18. On April 23, Swarzak was released.

=== Kansas City Royals ===
On May 14, 2021, Swarzak signed a minor league contract with the Kansas City Royals organization and was assigned to the Triple-A Omaha Storm Chasers. On June 18, Swarzak was selected to the active roster and made his Royals debut the following day against the Boston Red Sox, pitching for his tenth major league team. Swarzak struggled to a 9.39 ERA in 7 appearances before being designated for assignment on July 17. On July 21, Swarzak cleared waivers and elected free agency.
