= Tyler Robertson =

American baseball player (born 1987)

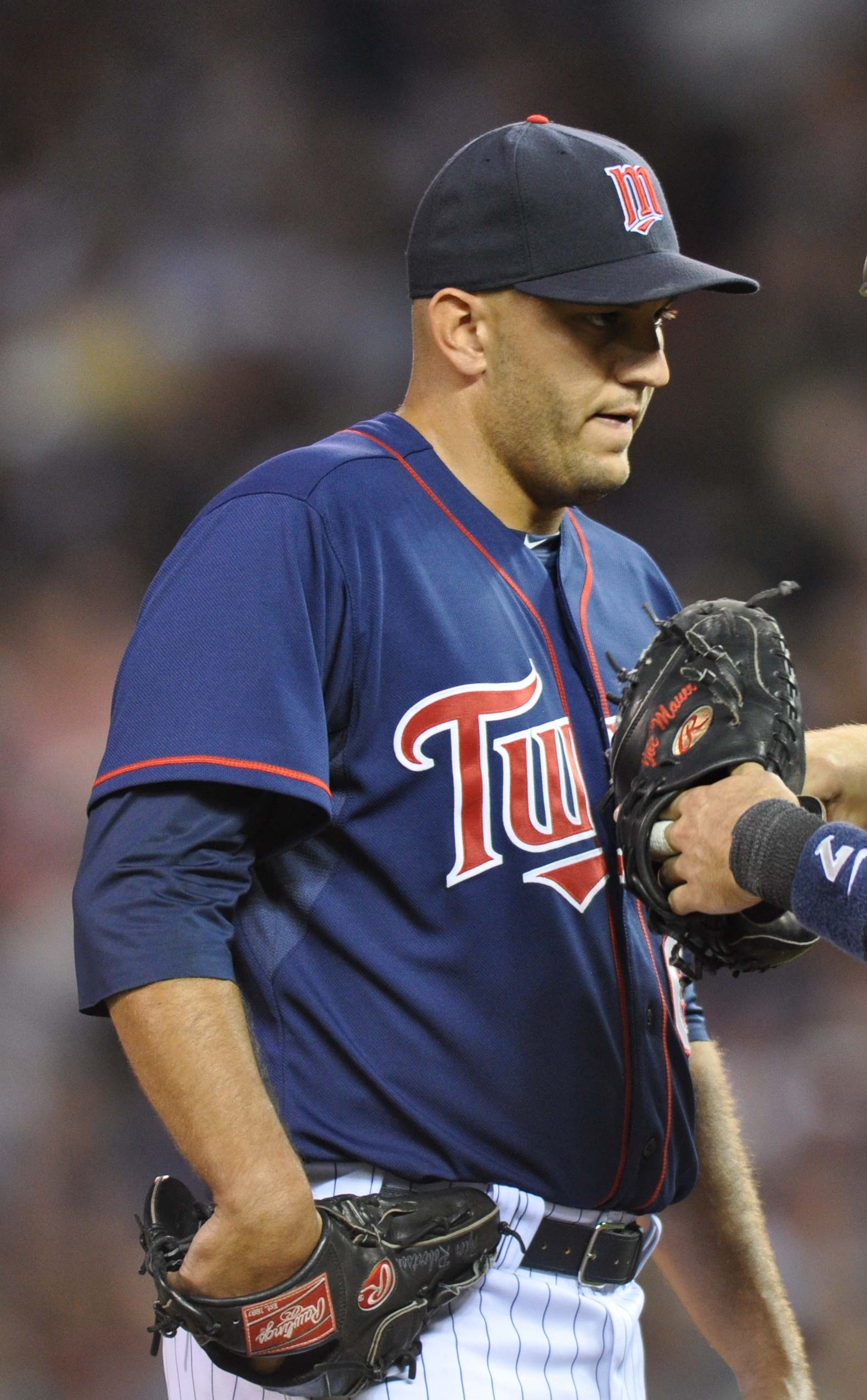
- Robertson with the Minnesota Twins
- Pitcher
- Born: December 23, 1987 (age 38); Simi Valley, California, U.S.
- Batted: Left Threw: Left

MLB debut
- June 26, 2012, for the Minnesota Twins

Last MLB appearance
- April 5, 2013, for the Minnesota Twins

MLB statistics
- Win–loss record: 2–2
- Earned run average: 5.54
- Strikeouts: 28
- Stats at Baseball Reference

Teams
- Minnesota Twins (2012–2013)

Tyler Robertson (born December 23, 1987) is an American former professional baseball pitcher. He has played in Major League Baseball (MLB) for the Minnesota Twins.

== Career ==
=== Minnesota Twins ===
The 6 feet 5 inches (1.96 m), 220 pounds (100 kg) left-hander was the Twins' third-round pick in the 2006 Major League Baseball draft. He made his professional debut with the rookie-level Gulf Coast League Twins. Robertson posted a 9-5 record and 2.29 ERA with 123 strikeouts over 18 games (16 starts) for the Single-A Beloit Snappers in 2007.

In the first half of the 2008 season, Tyler went 4–2 with a 2.76 earned run average and 58 strike outs over 11 starts to help the Fort Myers Miracle capture the Florida State League first-half West Division title. One of those wins was a complete game 6–1 victory over the Tampa Yankees at Steinbrenner Field. He was pulled after four innings against the Vero Beach Devil Rays on July 7 with shoulder soreness, and did not pitch again for the rest of the season. Robertson made 26 starts for Fort Myers in 2009, accumulating an 8-8 record and 3.33 ERA with 103 strikeouts across 143 1/3 innings pitched.

Robertson split the 2010 season between the Double-A New Britain Rock Cats and Triple-A Rochester Red Wings. In 28 starts for the two affiliates, he logged a cumulative 4-14 record and 5.41 ERA with 97 strikeouts across 149 2/3 innings pitched. Robertson made 55 relief outings for New Britain the following year, compiling a 10-3 record and 3.61 ERA with 88 strikeouts and 16 saves across 89 2/3 innings pitched. On November 18, 2011, the Twins added Robertson to their 40-man roster to protect him from the Rule 5 draft.

Robertson made his major league debut on June 26, 2012, where Robertson struck out the first three batters he faced. Robertson made 40 appearances out of the bullpen for Minnesota during his rookie campaign, compiling a 2-2 record and 5.40 ERA with 26 strikeouts over 25 innings of work. He made two appearances for Minnesota during the 2013 campaign, but struggled to a 9.00 ERA with two strikeouts across one inning pitched. On June 3, 2013, Robertson was designated for assignment following the promotion of Clete Thomas.

=== Washington Nationals ===
On June 7, 2013, the Washington Nationals claimed Robertson off waivers. He made 26 appearances (including one start) for the Triple-A Syracuse Chiefs, registering a 2-2 record and 3.04 ERA with 24 strikeouts and one save across 26 2/3 innings pitched. Robertson was designated for assignment by the Nationals on November 20, after multiple prospects were added to the 40-man roster. He cleared waivers and was sent outright to Triple-A Syracuse on November 25.

Robertson pitched in 12 contests for Triple-A Syracuse during the 2014 season, recording a 4.08 ERA with 14 strikeouts and one save across 17 2/3 innings pitched.

=== Miami Marlins ===
On March 20, 2015, Robertson signed a minor league contract with the Miami Marlins. He did not make an appearance for the organization and elected free agency following the season on November 6.

== Pitching style ==
Robertson mainly throws three pitches — a four-seam fastball and two-seam fastball hovering around 90 mph, as well as a slider in the low-to-mid 80s. The slider is actually his most commonly thrown pitch against left-handed hitters, especially when he is ahead in the count. Robertson has also thrown a small handful of curveballs and changeups.
