= Jeff Gray (baseball, born 1981) =

American baseball player

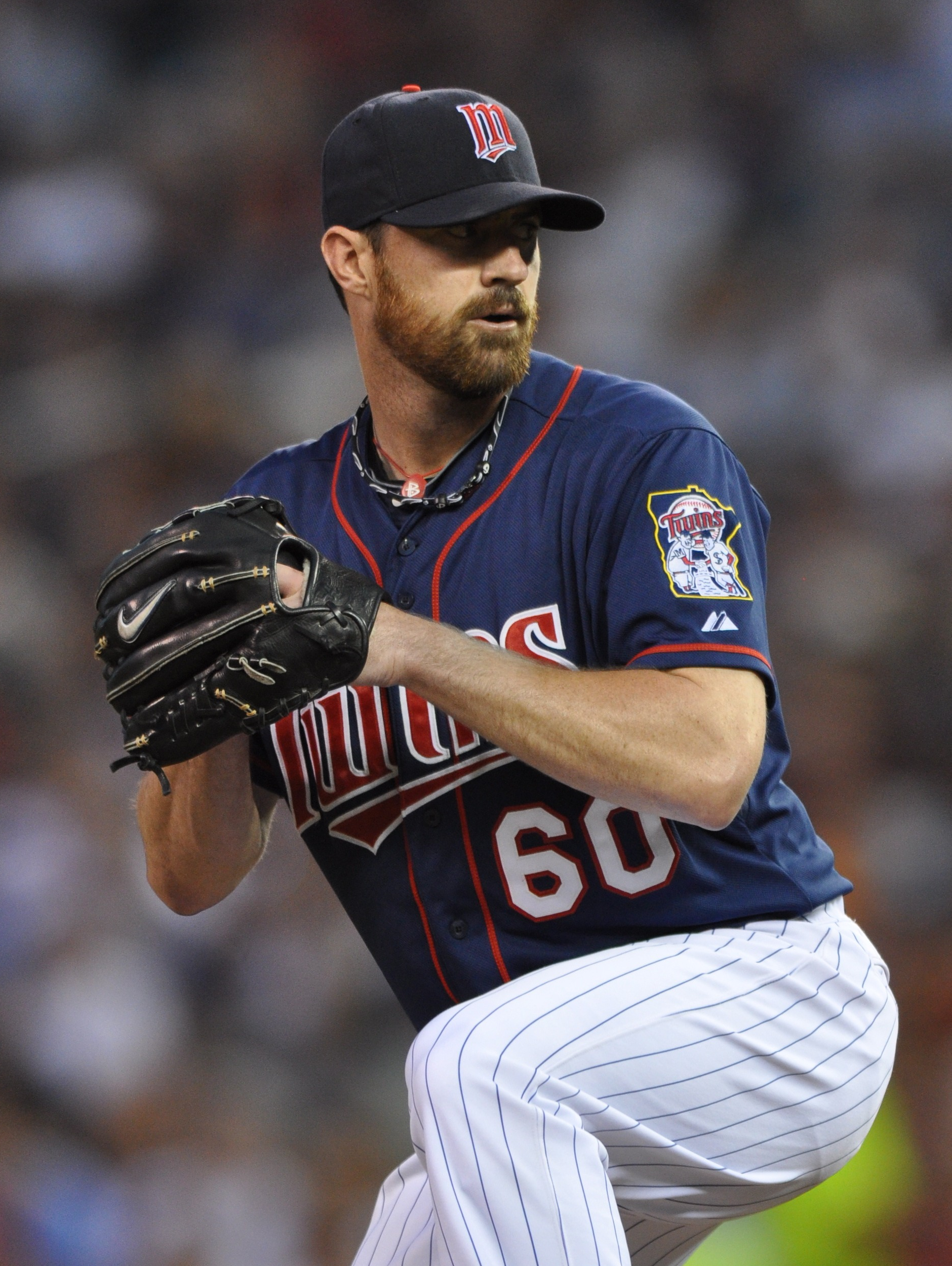
- Gray with the Minnesota Twins in 2012
- Pitcher
- Born: November 19, 1981 (age 44); Texas City, Texas, U.S.
- Batted: Right Threw: Right

MLB debut
- September 8, 2008, for the Oakland Athletics

Last MLB appearance
- August 26, 2012, for the Minnesota Twins

MLB statistics
- Win–loss record: 7–3
- Earned run average: 4.99
- Strikeouts: 76
- Stats at Baseball Reference

Teams
- Oakland Athletics (2008–2009); Chicago Cubs (2010); Chicago White Sox (2011); Seattle Mariners (2011); Minnesota Twins (2012)

Jeffrey Michael Gray (born November 19, 1981) is an American former professional baseball pitcher. He played in Major League Baseball (MLB) for the Oakland Athletics, Chicago Cubs, Chicago White Sox. Seattle Mariners, and Minnesota Twins. He graduated from Lafayette High School in Wildwood, Missouri and attended Southwest Missouri State University.

== Career ==
=== Oakland Athletics ===
Gray was selected by the Oakland Athletics in the 2004 Major League Baseball draft.

Gray participated in the 2008 Arizona Fall League season as a member of the Phoenix Desert Dogs.

=== Chicago Cubs ===
He was traded by the Athletics to the Chicago Cubs on December 3, 2009 for Jake Fox and Aaron Miles.

=== Chicago White Sox ===
On November 23, 2010, Gray signed a minor league contract for the Chicago White Sox. He was designated for assignment on May 11, 2011.

=== Seattle Mariners ===
On 13 May 2011, he was claimed off waivers by the Seattle Mariners.

=== Minnesota Twins ===
On 31 October 2011, he was claimed off waivers by the Minnesota Twins.

=== Return to White Sox ===
On 21 December 2012, the Chicago White Sox signed him to a 1-year minor league contract with an invite to spring training.

On 18 July 2013, the White Sox released Gray.
