= Robbie Ross Jr. =

American baseball player (born 1989)

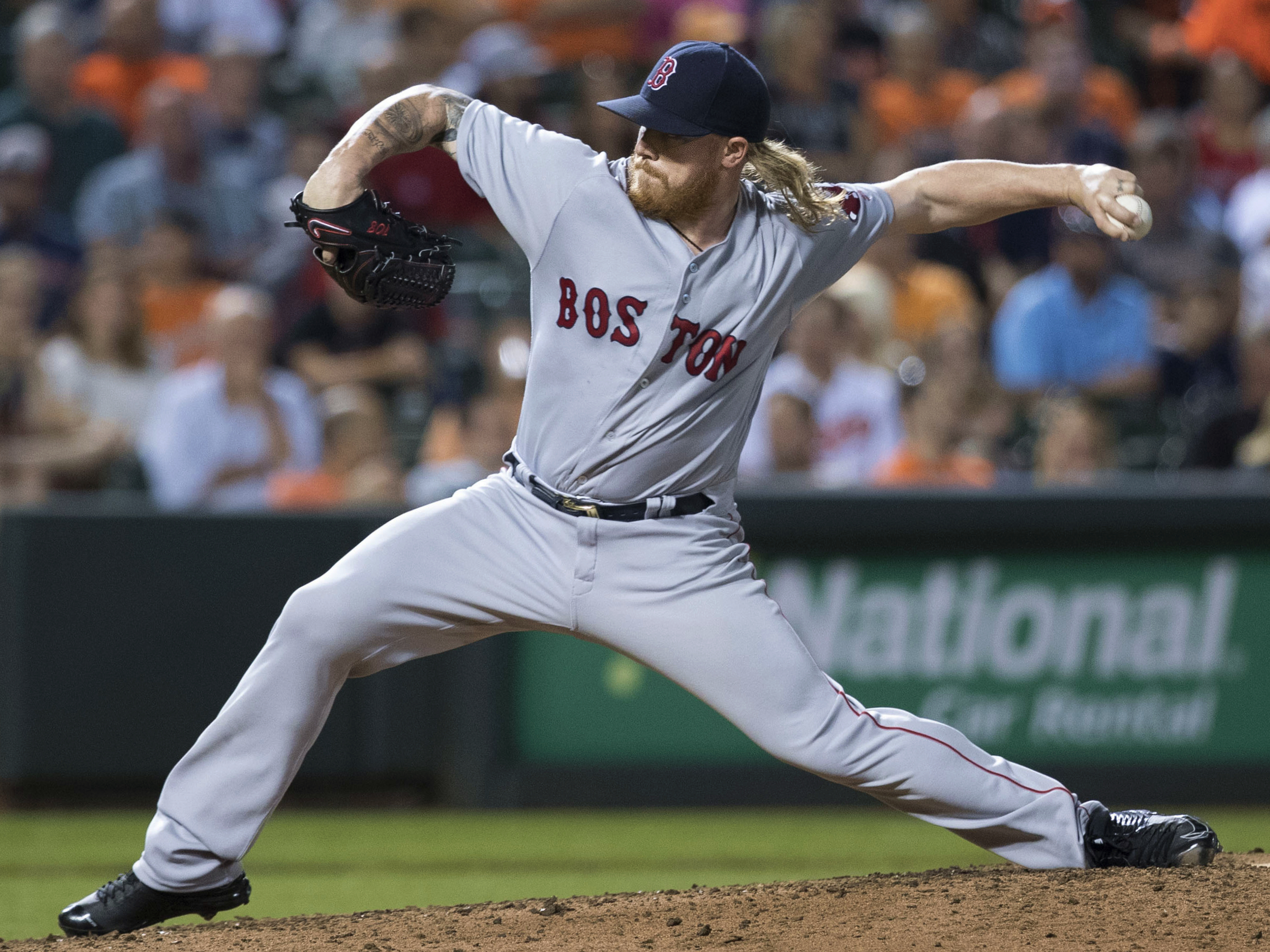
- Ross pitching for the Boston Red Sox in 2016
- Relief pitcher
- Born: June 24, 1989 (age 37); Lexington, Kentucky, U.S.
- Batted: Left Threw: Left

MLB debut
- April 8, 2012, for the Texas Rangers

Last MLB appearance
- May 18, 2017, for the Boston Red Sox

MLB statistics
- Win–loss record: 16–12
- Earned run average: 3.92
- Strikeouts: 274
- Stats at Baseball Reference

Teams
- Texas Rangers (2012–2014); Boston Red Sox (2015–2017)

Robert Charles Ross Jr. (born June 24, 1989) is an American former professional baseball pitcher. He played in Major League Baseball (MLB) for the Texas Rangers and Boston Red Sox.

== Amateur career ==
Ross was born and raised in Lexington, Kentucky. He attended Trinity Christian Academy and later Lexington Christian Academy, where he competed in both baseball and soccer. Ross had a 1.98 career earned run average (ERA) with 176 strikeouts in 116 innings pitched, and also batted .404 with 52 runs batted in and 33 stolen bases. During his senior year, Ross was selected as the Gatorade Baseball Player of the Year in Kentucky.

== Professional career ==
=== Texas Rangers ===
The Texas Rangers selected Ross in the second round of the 2008 Major League Baseball draft.

In 2011, he had a 10-5 win–loss record with a 2.34 ERA and a 1.041 WHIP, starting in 26 of the 27 game he pitched, with the Single–A Myrtle Beach Pelicans and Double-A Frisco RoughRiders.

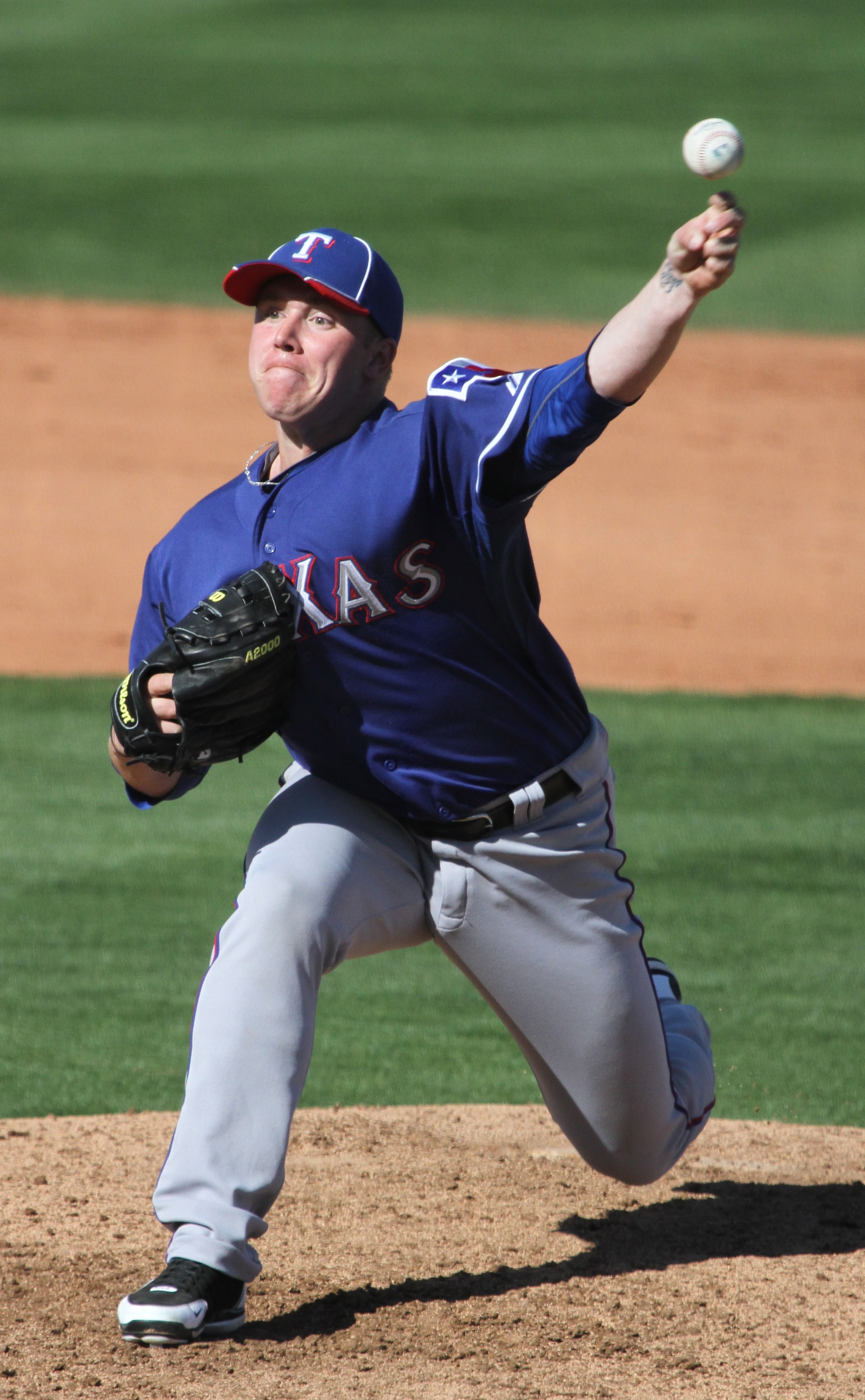
Ross with the Texas Rangers in 2012 spring training

Ross made the Rangers opening day roster out of spring training in 2012. He made his major league debut on April 8, 2012, against the Chicago White Sox. Robbie's first strikeout victim was Paul Konerko. His first major league victory came April 14, 2012, against the Minnesota Twins in relief of Yu Darvish. The very next day, he picked up his second victory, also against the Twins, in relief of Neftalí Feliz. For the season, he was 6–0 with a 2.22 ERA in 58 relief appearances.

Pitching for Texas in 2013, he was 4–2 with a 3.03 ERA in 65 relief appearances.

=== Boston Red Sox ===
On January 27, 2015, the Rangers traded Ross to the Boston Red Sox in exchange for pitcher Anthony Ranaudo.

In his first season with the Red Sox, Ross appeared in 54 games, collecting a 0–2 record, with a 3.86 ERA, striking out 53 batters. In 2015, Ross had a solid season posting a 3.86 ERA in 54 appearances, and even serving as the Red Sox closer for a brief time. He would amass the only 6 saves of his MLB career in 2015.

In 2016, Ross was an integral part of the Boston bullpen, appearing in 54 games, racking up 55 1/3 innings, to the tune of a 3–2 record, a 3.22 ERA, and 56 strikeouts. Ross' 2017 season was cut short due to a back injury, he appeared in only 8 games. He was outrighted off the roster after the season and he elected to become a free agent.

=== Chicago White Sox ===
Ross signed a minor league deal with the Chicago White Sox on March 4, 2018. He was released on June 9, 2018.

=== Pittsburgh Pirates ===
On March 4, 2019, Ross signed a minor league deal with the Pittsburgh Pirates. He was released on March 25, 2019.

=== Sugar Land Skeeters ===
On June 19, 2019, Ross signed with the Sugar Land Skeeters of the independent Atlantic League of Professional Baseball. He was released on July 22, 2019.

=== Sugar Land Lightning Sloths ===
In July 2020, Ross signed on to play for the Sugar Land Lightning Sloths of the Constellation Energy League (a makeshift 4-team independent league created as a result of the COVID-19 pandemic) for the 2020 season. In five games he held opposing teams scoreless over five innings, in which he did not give up any hits or walks, and struck out seven batters.

=== Detroit Tigers ===
On January 16, 2021, Ross signed a minor league contract with the Detroit Tigers organization. He was assigned to the Triple-A Toledo Mud Hens to begin the year. Ross appeared in 27 games for Triple-A Toledo, going 2–8 with a 7.03 ERA and 26 strikeouts. On August 6, Ross retired from professional baseball.

=== Wild Health Genomes ===
On May 3, 2022, Ross came out of retirement to sign with the Wild Health Genomes of the Atlantic League of Professional Baseball. In 30 games, Ross registered a 3.40 ERA with 58 strikeouts and 2 saves in 45 innings of work. He became a free agent after the season.

=== Spire City Ghost Hounds ===
On July 1, 2023, Ross signed with the Spire City Ghost Hounds of the Atlantic League of Professional Baseball. After allowing 2 runs (1 earned) on 2 hits and 2 walks across 1 1/3 innings pitched during his only appearance, Ross was released by the team the following day.

=== Lexington Counter Clocks ===
On September 16, 2023, Ross signed with the Lexington Counter Clocks of the Atlantic League of Professional Baseball. He started for Lexington that day, going 5 innings and allowing 2 runs (1 earned) on 3 hits and 3 walks with 7 strikeouts. He was released by the team the next day.

=== Mumbai Cobras ===
On October 23, 2023, Ross was selected in the second round by the Mumbai Cobras, with the 12th overall pick, of the 2023 Baseball United inaugural draft. Ross pitched 1 1/3 innings for United All-Stars West in the league's inaugural showcase series, surrendering 2 runs (1 earned) on 3 hits and 2 walks.
