= Samuel Deduno =

Dominican baseball player (born 1983)

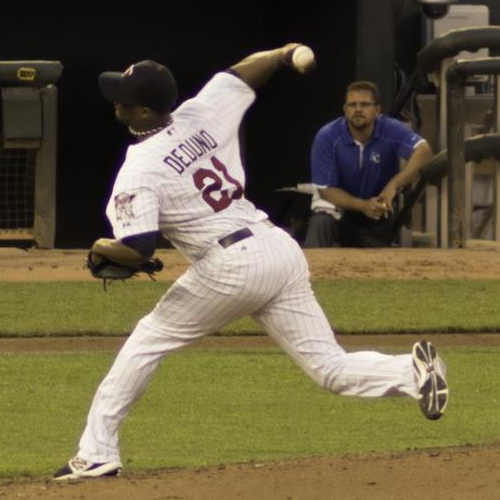
- Deduno with the Minnesota Twins
- Pitcher
- Born: July 2, 1983 (age 43); La Romana, Dominican Republic
- Batted: Right Threw: Right

MLB debut
- August 27, 2010, for the Colorado Rockies

Last MLB appearance
- May 13, 2015, for the Houston Astros

MLB statistics
- Win–loss record: 16–20
- Earned run average: 4.38
- Strikeouts: 231
- Stats at Baseball Reference

Teams
- Colorado Rockies (2010); San Diego Padres (2011); Minnesota Twins (2012–2014); Houston Astros (2014–2015)
Medals
Men's baseball
Representing Dominican Republic
World Baseball Classic
Gold medal – first place	2013 San Francisco	Team

Samuel Deduno Lake (born July 2, 1983) is a Dominican former professional baseball pitcher. He played in Major League Baseball (MLB) for the Colorado Rockies, San Diego Padres, Minnesota Twins and Houston Astros.

== Playing career ==
=== Colorado Rockies ===
Deduno was signed as an undrafted free agent by the Colorado Rockies in 2003. Deduno led the Texas League in strike outs in 2007, but missed the 2008 season with an injury.

Deduno was added to the 40-man roster for the Rockies after the 2008 season.

He was called up to the Rockies on August 26, 2010.

=== San Diego Padres ===
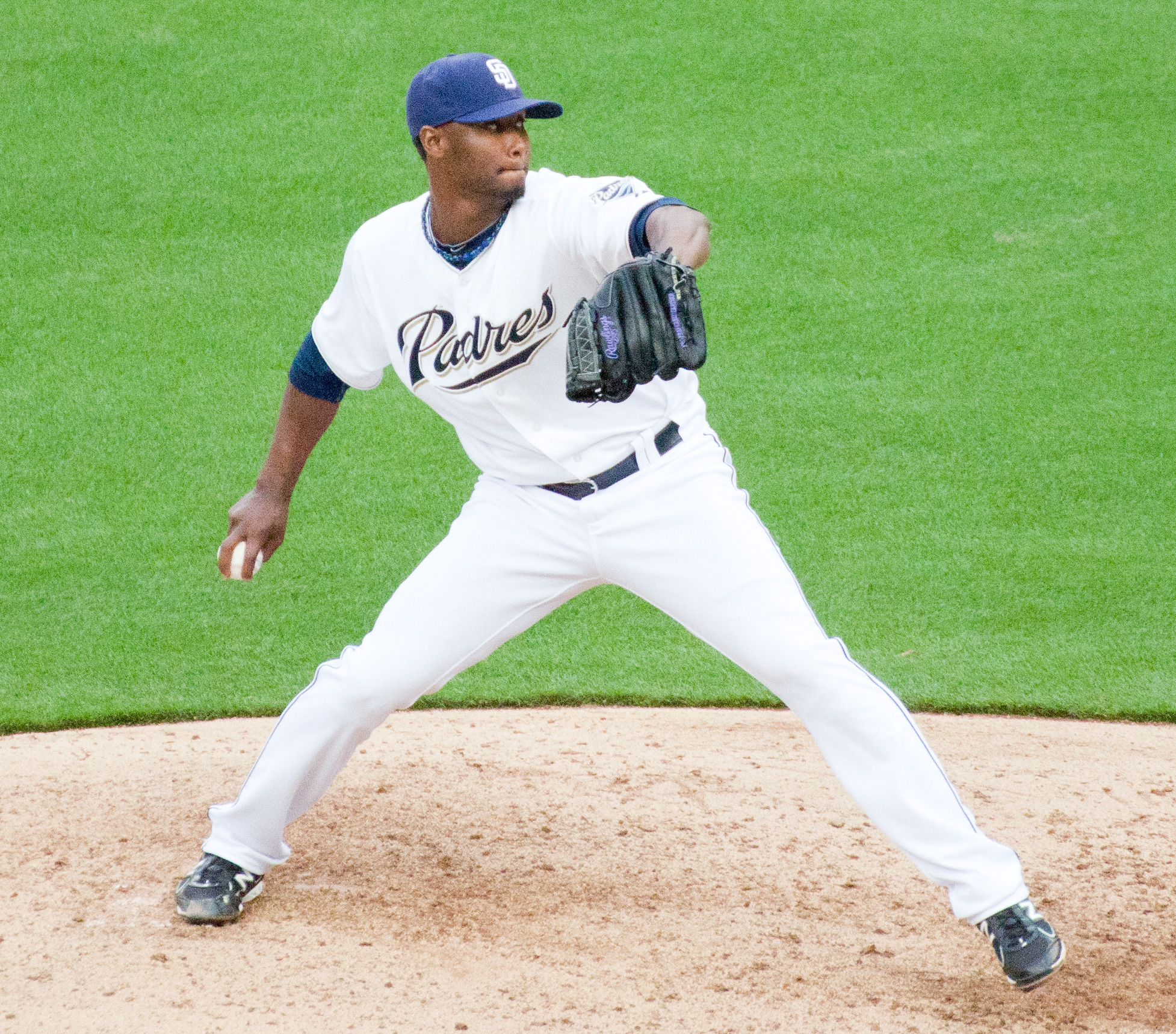
Deduno pitching for the San Diego Padres in 2011

On January 28, 2011, He was claimed off waivers by the San Diego Padres. On May 23, Deduno was designated for assignment to clear a spot on the 40-man roster for Blake Tekotte. He cleared waivers and was sent outright to Triple-A Tucson Padres on May 26. He elected free agency following the season on November 2.

=== Minnesota Twins ===
On November 18, 2011, Deduno signed a minor league contract with the Minnesota Twins. On July 5, 2012, he had his contract purchased by the Twins. Deduno recorded his first win on July 22, in a game against the Kansas City Royals. In 2012, Deduno pitched 6–5 with a 4.44 ERA in 15 starts with 6.5 K/9 and 1.08 K/BB. He was sent outright to Triple-A Rochester Red Wings on November 2.

On November 5, Deduno signed a minor league deal with an invitation to spring training to stay with the Twins. Deduno made 18 starts with the Twins in 2013, and he was 8–8 with a 3.83 ERA, striking out 67 in 108 innings.

Deduno opened 2014 in the Twins bullpen after he lost the 5th starter spot to Kyle Gibson. He made 7 appearances in the bullpen, having a 2.89 ERA in 18.2 innings before being moved to the rotation to replace the injured Mike Pelfrey. Deduno didn't fare so well in the rotation, where in 8 starts, he was 3–5 with a 6.52 ERA and a 1.603 WHIP in 38.2 innings, or less than 5 innings per start. He was moved back to the bullpen on June 17 in favor of Yohan Pino.

=== Houston Astros ===
On August 30, 2014, Deduno was claimed off waivers by the Houston Astros. In 14 appearances for Houston in 2014 and 2015, Deduno registered a 5.76 ERA with 26 strikeouts. He was sent outright to Triple-A Fresno Grizzlies on November 10. He elected free agency following the season on November 12.

=== Baltimore Orioles ===
On February 19, 2016, Deduno signed a minor league contract with the Baltimore Orioles. Deduno had undergone hip surgery in the offseason and was not going to be able to pitch until mid season. He made 10 appearances for the rookie–level Gulf Coast League Orioles, compiling a 1.50 ERA with 23 strikeouts across 18 innings pitched. Deduno was released by the Orioles organization on August 9.

== Coaching career ==
Deduno joined the Colorado Rockies organization as a minor league coach prior to the 2020 season.

Deduno assumed the role of pitching coach for the Dominican Summer League Rockies for the 2024 season. He reprised his role for the 2025 season.

== Pitching style ==
Deduno relies mostly, especially against right-handed hitters, on a four-seam fastball (89–92 mph) and curveball (80–84 mph). He throws a small amount of two-seam fastballs, sliders, and changeups against left-handed hitters. The curve is by far his most common pitch in two-strike counts and when he is ahead in the count.

His four-seamer has the smallest amount of "rise", or vertical break, among all major league starters since 2007. This sinker-like effect gives him the best ground ball/fly ball ratio (6:1) among four-seamers in that group. Remarking on its unusual movement, former Twins catcher Ryan Doumit said, "His fastball's unlike anything I've ever seen. ... It's like catching a 92-mile-an-hour knuckleball."

Deduno has a high walk rate, walking 55 batters in his first 83 innings.

== Awards and honors ==
- 2007 Texas League Pitcher of the Week
- 2004 Pioneer League Pitcher of the Year
- 2004 Pioneer League Post-Season All-Star
