= Cole De Vries =

American baseball player (born 1985)

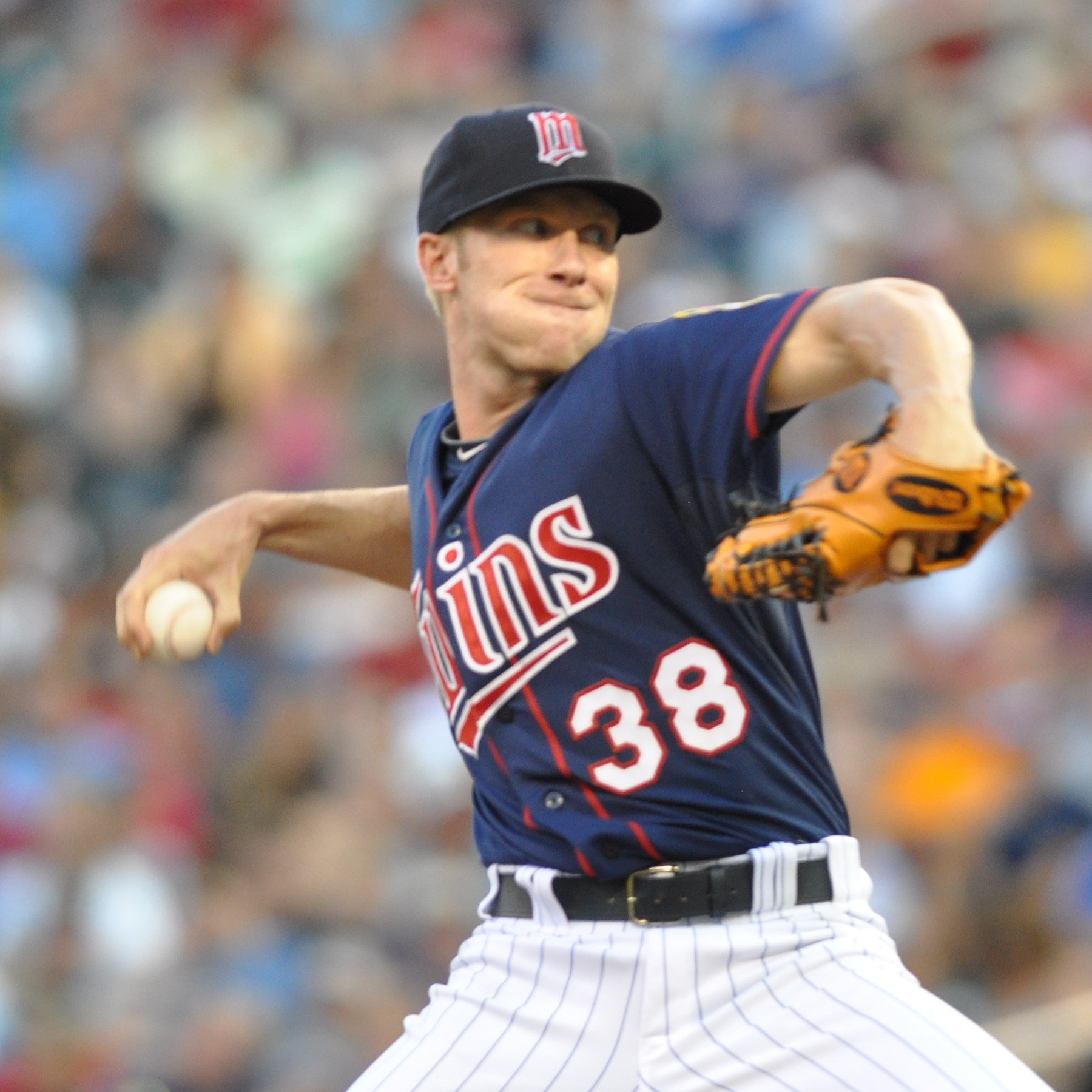
- De Vries with the Minnesota Twins.
- Pitcher
- Born: February 12, 1985 (age 41); St. Louis Park, Minnesota, U.S.
- Batted: Right Threw: Right

MLB debut
- May 24, 2012, for the Minnesota Twins

Last MLB appearance
- September 28, 2013, for the Minnesota Twins

MLB statistics
- Win–loss record: 5–7
- Earned run average: 5.08
- Strikeouts: 70
- Stats at Baseball Reference

Teams
- Minnesota Twins (2012–2013)

Cole William De Vries (born February 12, 1985) is an American former professional baseball pitcher who played in Major League Baseball with the Minnesota Twins. He is 6 feet 2 inches (1.88 m) tall and weighs 180 pounds (82 kg).

== Amateur career ==
A native of St. Louis Park, Minnesota, De Vries attended Eden Prairie High School and the University of Minnesota, where he played college baseball for the Golden Gophers. In 2006, he played collegiate summer baseball with the Brewster Whitecaps of the Cape Cod Baseball League.

== Professional career ==
De Vries signed with the Minnesota Twins as an undrafted free agent on August 22, 2006.

De Vries spent the 2008 season with the Twins' High-A affiliate, the Fort Myers Miracle. In the first half of the season, De Vries went 5–5 with a 3.11 earned run average and 47 strike outs over 13 appearances (12 starts) in Fort Myers Miracle's quest for the Florida State League first-half West Division title. De Vries pitched 6.2 innings of scoreless ball in the first playoff game against the second half division winners, the Dunedin Blue Jays to earn the 2–1 win for the Miracle in Dunedin.

In his first start of the 2009 season, De Vries led the New Britain Rock Cats to their first victory, pitching 5 1/3 innings, and giving up only one earned run against the New Hampshire Fisher Cats, the Eastern League Double A farm club of the Toronto Blue Jays. For the season, he went 7–14 with a 4.84 ERA in 26 starts. He made ten appearances for the Rock Cats in 2010, five starts and five relief appearances, before being promoted to Rochester. He was used exclusively out of the bullpen with the Red Wings, producing a 5.06 ERA and ten strike outs in five appearances before returning to New Britain.

On May 22, 2012, De Vries was promoted by the Twins to replace Jason Marquis, who was designated for assignment. De Vries debuted in the Major Leagues on May 24, and recorded his first Major League win on June 4, against the Kansas City Royals.

De Vries made four appearances (including two starts) for Minnesota during the 2013 season, but struggled to an 0-2 record and 10.80 ERA with 12 strikeouts over 15 innings of work. On October 2, 2013, De Vries was removed from the 40-man roster and sent outright to the Triple-A Rochester Red Wings. He retired after the season.

== Awards ==
- Minnesota All-State High School Team (2003)
- Class 3A High School Player of the Year (2003)
- All-Big Ten (Second-Team) (2006)
- Midwest League All-Star (2007)
- Brodie Trophy 2007 Player of the Year (Co-winner with Alex Burnett)
