= Kyle Waldrop =

American baseball player (born 1985)

- Pitcher
- Born: October 27, 1985 (age 40); Knoxville, Tennessee, U.S.
- Batted: Right Threw: Right

MLB debut
- September 5, 2011, for the Minnesota Twins

Last MLB appearance
- October 2, 2012, for the Minnesota Twins

MLB statistics
- Win–loss record: 1–1
- Earned run average: 3.62
- Strikeouts: 12
- Stats at Baseball Reference

Teams
- Minnesota Twins (2011–2012)

Steven Kyle Waldrop (born October 27, 1985) is an American former professional baseball pitcher. He played in Major League Baseball (MLB) for the Minnesota Twins.

== Career ==
=== Minnesota Twins ===
Kyle Waldrop was the Minnesota Twins' third pick in the first round of the 2004 Major League Baseball draft, when the Twins had five first-round picks. He was the 25th player drafted that year.

A native of Knoxville, Tennessee and a 2004 graduate of Farragut High School in Farragut, Tennessee, Waldrop has played for Twins minor-league teams in Elizabethton, Tennessee, Beloit, Wisconsin, Fort Myers, Florida, New Britain, Connecticut, and Rochester, New York.

Waldrop missed the entire 2008 season due to a shoulder injury.

In 2011, he was one of six pitchers not on the Twins' major league roster to be invited to the team's spring training camp in Fort Myers.

On September 5, 2011, Waldrop was called up from Rochester with Brian Dinkelman.

=== Pittsburgh Pirates ===
On January 29, 2013, Waldrop signed a minor league contract with the Pittsburgh Pirates organization.
