= Glen Perkins =

American baseball player (born 1983)

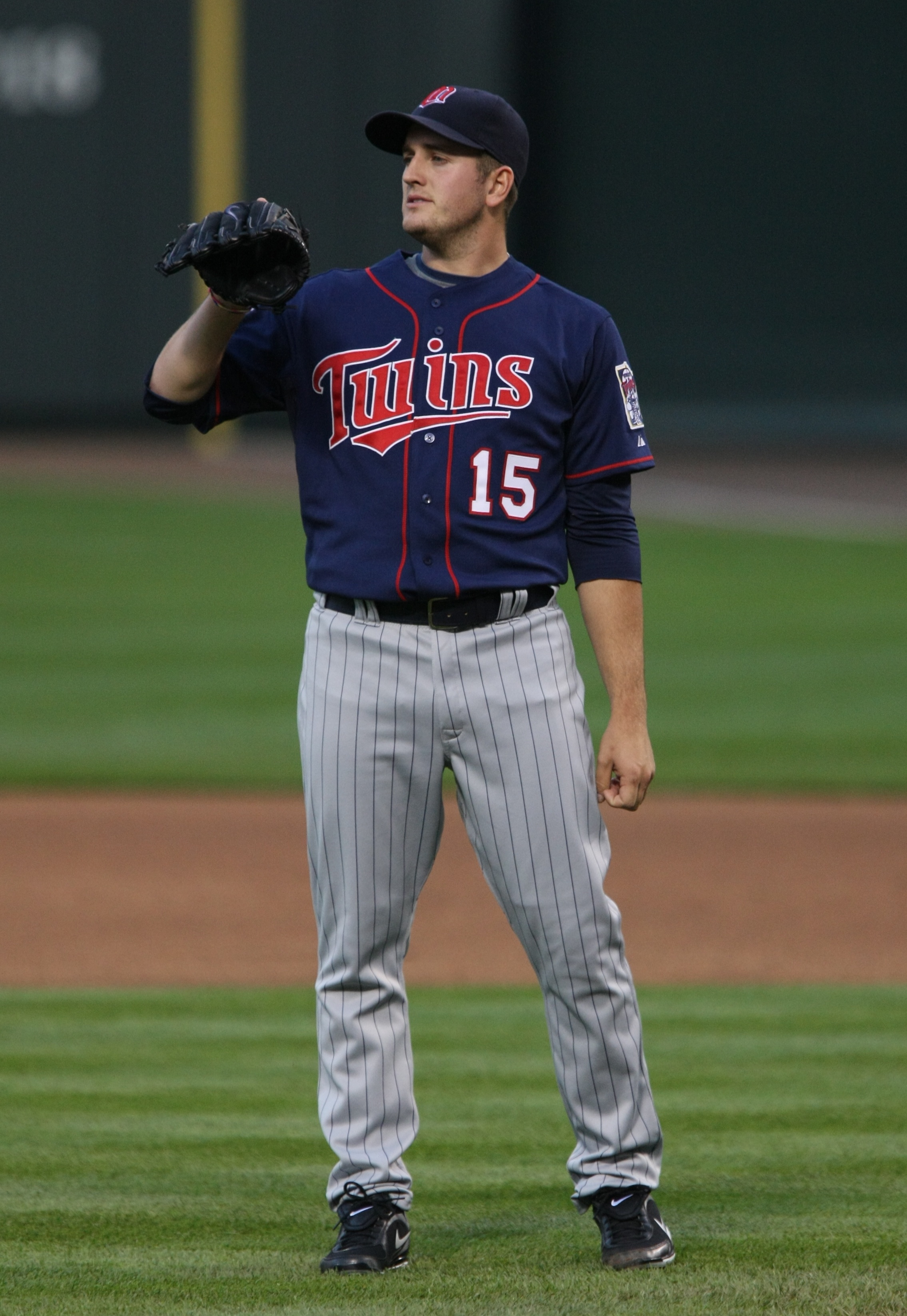
- Perkins with the Minnesota Twins
- Pitcher
- Born: March 2, 1983 (age 43); St. Paul, Minnesota, U.S.
- Batted: Left Threw: Left

MLB debut
- September 21, 2006, for the Minnesota Twins

Last MLB appearance
- September 30, 2017, for the Minnesota Twins

MLB statistics
- Win–loss record: 35–25
- Earned run average: 3.88
- Strikeouts: 504
- Saves: 120
- Stats at Baseball Reference

Teams
- Minnesota Twins (2006–2017)

Career highlights and awards
- 3× All-Star (2013–2015)

Glen Weston Perkins (born March 2, 1983) is an American former professional baseball pitcher and a television analyst. He played his entire career in Major League Baseball (MLB) for the Minnesota Twins.

He made his major league debut with the Minnesota Twins in 2006. Perkins attended the University of Minnesota in Minneapolis–St. Paul and Stillwater Area High School in Oak Park Heights. Perkins earned his first major league win on May 20, 2008, against the Texas Rangers.

== College and minor league career ==
Perkins played his college ball for the Minnesota Golden Gophers in 2003 and 2004. With the Gophers in 2003, he went 10–2 and posted a 2.91 ERA with 117 strikeouts in 15 games (13 starts). In his 2004 season with the Gophers, he went 9–3 and posted a 2.83 ERA with 113 strikeouts in 16 games (15 starts). Perkins was drafted by the Minnesota Twins in the first round (22nd overall) of the 2004 MLB draft, as a compensation pick from the Seattle Mariners for their signing of Eddie Guardado.

Between 2004 and 2008, Perkins played most of his games for the Minnesota Twins minor league system. He pitched for the Elizabethton Twins, Quad Cities River Bandits, Fort Myers Miracle, Gulf Coast Twins, New Britain Rock Cats, and the Rochester Red Wings. In his three seasons with Twins' minor league teams, he pitched 386.2 innings, posting a 16–22 record with a 3.50 ERA and 380 strikeouts. He was ranked number 66 in Baseball America's Top 100 Prospects.

== Major league career ==
=== Minnesota Twins ===
==== 2006 season ====
Perkins made his MLB debut on September 21, 2006, against the Boston Red Sox. Coming in to relieve teammate Matt Guerrier, Perkins pitched 1 1/3 perfect innings. Perkins pitched in four regular season games in the 2006 season, all in September as a relief pitcher. He pitched 5 2/3 innings, recording a 1.59 ERA while striking out six.

==== 2007 season ====
In his 2007 season, Perkins pitched in 19 games for the Twins, all as a reliever. In 28 2/3 innings pitched, Perkins finished the season with a 3.14 ERA, 12 walks, and 20 strikeouts. Due to a shoulder injury, he spent time significant time on the disabled list from May 22 to September 11.

==== 2008 season ====
Perkins pitched 12 innings for the Twins during spring training, going 1–2 with a 7.50 ERA. He did not make the team and was sent down to Triple-A Rochester. While with Rochester, he pitched 33 1/3 innings, compiling a 2–1 record, a 2.97 ERA, and 27 strikeouts in seven games (six starts). On May 7, 2008, Perkins was called up to replace injured teammate Scott Baker. He started his first major league game against the Boston Red Sox on May 10, 2008, allowing three earned runs in six innings to record the loss. He recorded his first major league win in a home start against the Texas Rangers on May 20, 2008.

On May 25, 2008, Perkins pitched arguably his best MLB performance. Starting in a road game against the Detroit Tigers, Perkins recorded the win by pitching 7 2/3 innings while surrendering seven hits, one earned, two walks, and four strikeouts.

Through June 30, Perkins started in all 11 of his appearances with the Twins. He had pitched 64 2/3 innings, posting a 4–2 record, 4.31 ERA, and 38 strikeouts.

On July 18, 2008, Perkins went six innings combined with three relievers on a three-hit shutout of the Texas Rangers. It was the first time that season that the game's highest-scoring offense had been shut out. Perkins finished the 2008 season with a 12–4 record and a 4.41 ERA in 26 starts.

==== 2009 season ====
Perkins appeared in 18 games (17 starts) with the Twins in 2009, going 6–7 with a 5.89 ERA.

==== 2010 season ====
Perkins began 2010 with Triple-A Rochester. Through August, he was 4–9 with a 6.08 ERA in 23 starts the Red Wings, though he showed enough improvement to earn a call-up from the Twins on August 9. Perkins appeared in four games (one start), going 0–1 with a 9.00 ERA before being optioned back to Rochester on August 28 to make room for newly acquired pitcher Brian Fuentes. Perkins returned to the majors in September after rosters expanded. He finished the season 1–1 with a 5.82 ERA in 13 games (one start).

==== 2011 season ====
Perkins played the whole season as relief pitcher, finishing 4–4 with two saves and a 2.48 ERA in 65 relief appearances. Perkins won the Twins Pitcher of the Year Award and Twins Comeback Player of the Year Award after the breakout season.

On March 8, 2012, Perkins signed a three-year, $10.3 million extension with the Twins. Perkins was guaranteed $2.5 million in 2013, and $3.75 million in both 2014 and 2015. There was a 2016 option for $4.5 million with a $300,000 buyout.

==== 2012 season ====
Perkins became the Twins closer in July 2012 after an injury to his predecessor Matt Capps. He went on to finish the season 3–1 with 16 saves and a 2.56 ERA in 70 relief appearances.

==== 2013 season ====
Perkins was named to the American League All-Star team as an injury replacement. Despite the Twins' mediocre season, Perkins was 2–0 with 36 saves and a 2.30 ERA in 61 games.

==== 2014 season ====
On March 14, 2014, Perkins agreed to a four-year extension with the Twins worth a guaranteed $22.1 million. In July, he was named to his second All-Star game, where he was credited with the save for the American League in their 5–3 victory. He finished the season 4–3 with 34 saves and a 3.65 ERA in 63 relief appearances.

==== 2015 season ====
Perkins was an All-Star for the third straight year in 2015. He appeared in 60 games, going 3–5 with 32 saves and a 3.32 ERA, along with 54 strikeouts in 57 innings pitched.

==== 2016 season ====
After experiencing shoulder soreness at the beginning of the 2016 season, Perkins was placed on the DL after two appearances. On June 16, it was revealed Perkins would need season-ending surgery due to a torn labrum and damage to his rotator cuff.

==== 2017 season ====
After another injury-shortened season, Perkins' 2018 option was declined by the Twins with the expectation that the team would buy out his contract. He announced his retirement on January 23, 2018.

== Pitching style ==
Perkins threw three pitches: a four-seam fastball (95–97 mph), a two-seam fastball (93–96), and a slider (83–86). There is little variation in his pitch usage against right-handed and left-handed hitters. His velocity and effectiveness started to increase at the beginning of the 2011 season, coinciding with a move to the bullpen: "Going to the bullpen allowed me to get healthy. As a starter, I had just worn down." In 2009, as a starter, Perkins posted a 5.89 ERA and an average fastball speed of about 90 mph. His ERA dropped considerably in the bullpen (2.48 in 2011), and his strikeout rate nearly doubled. When Perkins was a starter, he also threw a curveball and changeup.

Perkins's four-seamer has become a weapon, averaging almost 96 mph in 2011 and 2012. It also has a very high (for a fastball) whiff rate of 29% in 2012.

Perkins claims to use PITCHf/x data and sabermetric statistics to study his pitching appearances.

== Broadcasting career ==
On August 1, 2018, Perkins served as analyst for the Facebook Live broadcasting crew working the Indians-Twins game. In 2019, Perkins began serving as a pre-game and post-game analyst for Twins telecasts on Fox Sports North, which later rebranded as Bally Sports North.
