= Middlebrook =

Middlebrook may refer to:

== Places ==
=== Australia ===
- Middlebrook, Queensland, a locality in the Tablelands Region

=== United Kingdom ===
- Middlebrook, Greater Manchester, an out-of-town complex near Bolton, England

=== United States ===
- Middlebrook, New Jersey, an unincorporated community in Somerset County
- Middlebrook, Virginia, census-designated place in Augusta County
  - Middlebrook Historic District, Augusta County, Virginia
- Middlebrook encampment, an American Independence War seasonal encampment
- Middlebrook (Knoxville, Tennessee), historic house in Knoxville, Tennessee

== People ==
- Middlebrook (surname), an English surname
- Middlebrook baronets, of Oakwell in the Parish of Birstall in the County of York

== See also ==
- Middle Brook (disambiguation)
- Middlebrooks, surname
