= 2012 Boston Red Sox season =

Major League Baseball season

2012 Boston Red Sox
- League: American League
- Division: East
- Ballpark: Fenway Park
- City: Boston, Massachusetts
- Record: 69–93 (.426)
- Divisional place: 5th
- Owners: John W. Henry (Fenway Sports Group)
- President: Larry Lucchino
- General manager: Ben Cherington
- Manager: Bobby Valentine
- Television: NESN (Don Orsillo, Jerry Remy)
- Radio: Boston Red Sox Radio Network (Joe Castiglione, Dave O'Brien, Jon Rish, Dale Arnold)
- Stats: ESPN.com; Baseball Reference

The 2012 Boston Red Sox season was the 112th season in the franchise's Major League Baseball history. The Red Sox finished last in the five-team American League East with a record of 69 wins and 93 losses, 26 games behind the first-place New York Yankees. It was the first time the Red Sox finished last in their division since 1992. Under manager Bobby Valentine, the Red Sox finished with the third-lowest winning percentage in the American League.

On the heels of a 2011 season that ended with the team losing 20 of 27 games during September, resulting in their elimination from playoff contention and the departure of manager Terry Francona, the Red Sox struggled throughout their 2012 campaign under new manager Bobby Valentine. At the All-Star break the team was 43–43, and at the end of August they had fallen to 62–71. At 66–81 on September 16, the Red Sox were mathematically eliminated from the playoff race. On September 19, the team lost their 82nd regular season game, thus clinching their first losing season since 1997. On September 30, the Red Sox reached the 90-loss mark, assuring them of their first season with 90 or more losses since 1966. The next day, the team suffered their 91st loss of the season, to the arch-rival Yankees, the most defeats since their 100-loss season in 1965. On October 4, a day after their final game of the season, Valentine was fired, with one year and two option years still remaining on his contract.

== Offseason ==
=== November ===
- Jonathan Papelbon, the closer of the Red Sox for seven seasons (2005–2011), signed a 4-year, $50 million deal with the Philadelphia Phillies.
- On November 29, 2011, Bobby Valentine accepted the Red Sox offer to become their new manager for the 2012 season.

=== December ===
- On December 13, 2011, the Red Sox signed catcher Kelly Shoppach to a 1-year, $1.35 million contract.
- On December 14, 2011, the Red Sox signed infielder Nick Punto to a 2-year contract.
- Also on December 14, 2011, the Red Sox traded right-handed pitcher Kyle Weiland and shortstop Jed Lowrie to the Houston Astros, in exchange for right-handed pitcher Mark Melancon.
- On December 28, 2011, the Red Sox traded right-handed pitcher Raul Alcantara, first baseman Miles Head, and right fielder Josh Reddick to the Oakland Athletics for right-handed pitcher Andrew Bailey and right fielder Ryan Sweeney.

=== January ===
- On January 9, 2012, the Red Sox signed starting pitcher Aaron Cook.
- On January 16, 2012, the Red Sox signed another pitcher, Vicente Padilla.
- On January 21, 2012, the Red Sox sent infielder Marco Scutaro to the Colorado Rockies in exchange for pitcher Clayton Mortensen.
- On January 23, 2012, the Red Sox agreed to sign outfielder Cody Ross to a 1-year, $3 million deal plus incentives.

== Spring training ==
The Red Sox began spring training play at the new JetBlue Park in Fort Myers, Florida, replacing City of Palms Park as their home field for spring training.

== Regular season ==
=== Opening Day ===
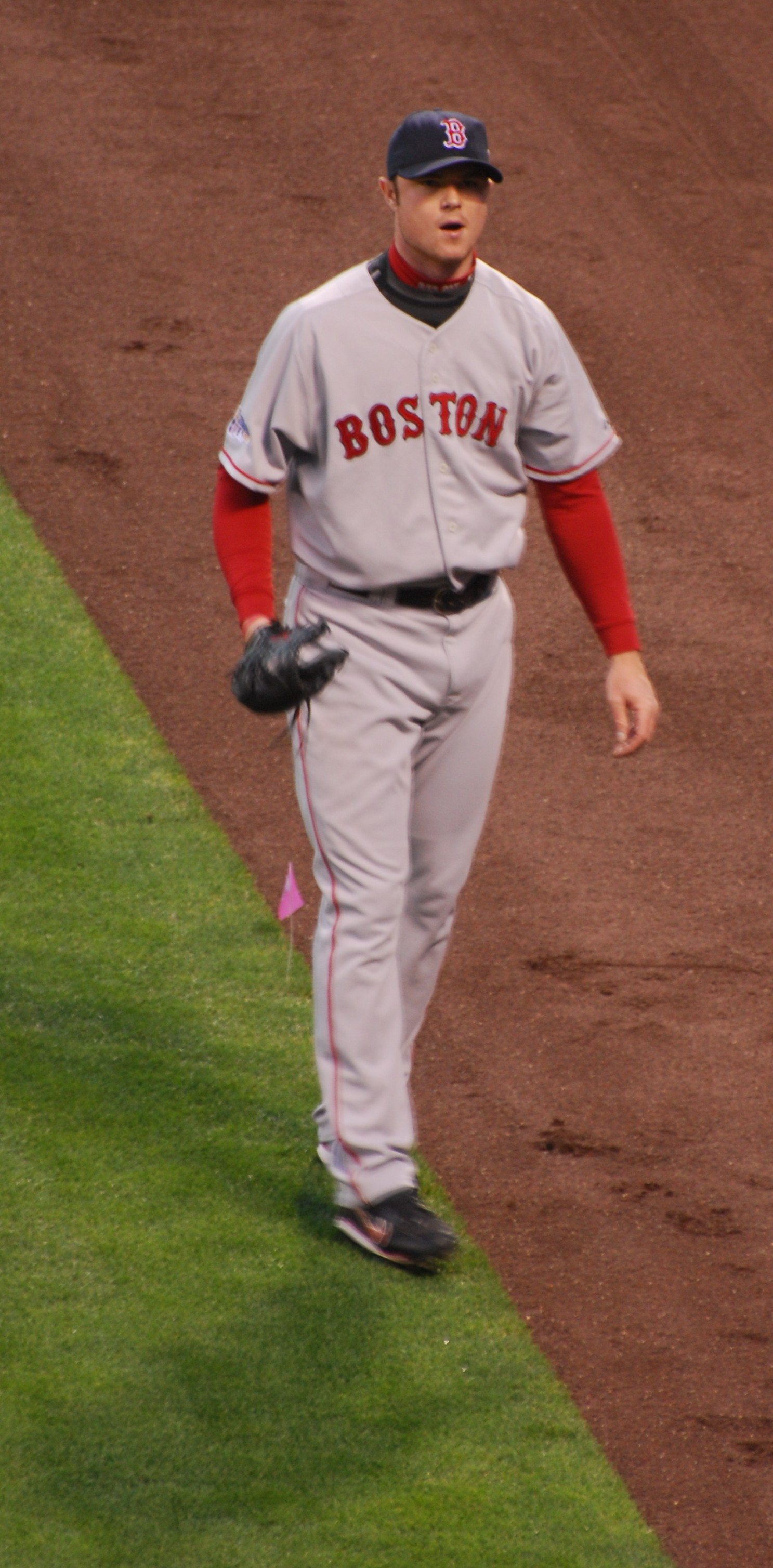
Opening Day starter Jon Lester

The Red Sox opened their 2012 season on April 5, 2012, against the Detroit Tigers. Tigers closer José Valverde recorded his first blown save since September 2, 2010, allowing the Red Sox to tie the game in the 9th inning, but the Tigers won, 3–2, on a game-winning single by Austin Jackson.

==== Opening Day lineup ====
2	Jacoby Ellsbury	CF
15	Dustin Pedroia	2B
28	Adrián González*	1B
34	David Ortiz	DH
20	Kevin Youkilis*	3B
12	Ryan Sweeney	RF
7	Cody Ross	LF
39	Jarrod Saltalamacchia	C
3	Mike Avilés	SS
31	Jon Lester	P

* Traded later in the season

=== April ===
After new closer Andrew Bailey injured his thumb days before Opening Day, the Red Sox went 1–5 over their first six games before mercifully hitting a three-game winning streak, resulting in a second consecutive undesirable start for the Red Sox after going 0–6 over their first six games in 2011. Center fielder Jacoby Ellsbury was placed on the 15-day disabled list after a shoulder injury during the home opener on April 13.

During an interview aired on local television on April 15, manager Bobby Valentine ripped 3B Kevin Youkilis, saying he is not "as physically or emotionally into the game as he has been in the past". After outspoken defense of Youkilis by teammates Dustin Pedroia and Adrián González, Valentine turned on his own words, saying he "was totally behind him". After Valentine's comments, the Red Sox plunged into a 5-game losing streak.

On April 20, the Red Sox celebrated 100 years at Fenway Park prior to the game against the New York Yankees with introductions of around 200 former Red Sox players, managers and coaches. Both teams wore throwback uniforms during the game similar to those used in the first major league game at Fenway Park. The Red Sox had off-white uniforms and caps, with only the words "Red Sox" in red across the chest. The Yankees' uniforms were all grey with the only printing the letters "NY" on the caps and left breast. After losing 4 consecutive games, the Red Sox took a 9–0 lead through 5 innings against the rival Yankees on April 21, but relief pitchers Vicente Padilla, Matt Albers, Franklin Morales, Alfredo Aceves, Justin Thomas, and Junichi Tazawa combined to allow 14 runs total in the 7th and 8th innings, as the Yankees prevailed by a score of 15–9, for the Red Sox' 5th consecutive loss. After the game, the Red Sox traded pitcher Michael Bowden to the Chicago Cubs for outfielder Marlon Byrd to help out their outfield after the injuries to Carl Crawford before the season and Ellsbury earlier in the season.

After their losing streak, the road was kind to the Red Sox, as they amassed a six-game winning streak by sweeping the Minnesota Twins in Minneapolis and taking the first three games of a four-game series against the Chicago White Sox, including scoring 9 runs in 5 innings against Philip Humber, who had thrown a perfect game in his previous start. In the end, the Red Sox closed out April with an 11–11 record.

=== May ===
The second month of the season did not start well for the Red Sox, as they went winless over their first five games in May. The Red Sox dropped the latter two games of a three-game series against the Oakland A's and were swept by the Baltimore Orioles in a three-game series that featured both 13- and 17-inning romps. On May 6, the Red Sox used all of their available bullpen pitchers in the lengthy 17-inning game and had to send in outfielder Darnell McDonald to pitch, ultimately leading to a 9–6 setback. On a lighter note, however, rookie third baseman Will Middlebrooks hit a grand slam in that game for his first Major League home run, and would then hit 2 home runs in the Red Sox' next game, which they won to snap their losing streak.

The Red Sox finally saw some measurable success at Fenway over and just after Mothers' Day weekend, taking three games of four from the Cleveland Indians and sweeping a quick two-game series over the Seattle Mariners before embarking on another road trip. During this time, McDonald went on the Disabled List, but the Red Sox recalled OF Daniel Nava and acquired OF Scott Podsednik, who had not played a Major League game since September 9, 2010. Podsednik was initially assigned to AAA Pawtucket for the time being. On this road trip, the Red Sox went 5–3, including taking 2 out of 3 games against the Philadelphia Phillies in their first interleague series of the year and 2 out of 3 games against the division-leading Orioles. Closer Alfredo Aceves had 4 saves in the 8-game road trip. While on the road trip, outfielders Cody Ross and Ryan Sweeney were injured, but 3B Kevin Youkilis returned from the Disabled List. With Middlebrooks settled into starting at third base, the Red Sox used Youkilis at first base with Adrián González playing right field. Podsednik and Che-Hsuan Lin were promoted from the minor leagues to help out in the injury-torn outfield.

On May 26, Jarrod Saltalamacchia had a pinch-hit, two-run home run off Fernando Rodney with one out in the bottom of the ninth inning, to lift the Red Sox to a 3–2 win over the Tampa Bay Rays at Fenway Park. It was the first walk-off home run of Saltalamacchia's career, while Rodney suffered the first blown save of the season after opening the year with a perfect 15-for-15 in save opportunities.

On May 29, the Red Sox cruised to a 6–3 win over pitcher Justin Verlander and the Detroit Tigers to achieve a record of 25–24, their first winning record of the season.

=== June ===
The Red Sox entered June having finally amassed a winning record, but they soon found themselves struggling to keep it afloat. The Sox peaked at 28–25 on June 2, before slipping into a three-game setback. The Red Sox took 2 of 3 from the Toronto Blue Jays but only salvaged one game of a three-game series against the Baltimore Orioles.

With a short period of divisional play now through, the Red Sox commenced with interleague play, facing off against the Washington Nationals, only to be swept by the Nats in the weekend series and yet again shoved below the .500 winning-percentage mark. Then, the Sox proceeded to try to rack up wins on the road over a six-game road voyage. They challenged the Miami Marlins, winning two of three games while visiting the new Marlins Park in Miami for the first time, and then proceeded to also take two of three games from the Chicago Cubs at Wrigley Field. Back at Fenway, starting pitcher Clay Buchholz continued his domination against Miami at Fenway on June 19, racking his 8th win of the season. On June 24, the Red Sox cruised to a 9–4 victory against Atlanta at Fenway in what was to become Kevin Youkilis' last game with the Red Sox before being traded to the Chicago White Sox. Fans, aware of the trade rumors, gave Youkilis a standing ovation after he hit a triple during the game. The Red Sox received utility player Brent Lillibridge and pitcher Zach Stewart (who was assigned to AAA Pawtucket) in the trade. On June 24, 2012, the Red Sox completed interleague play for the 2012 regular season. They finished off their homestand by welcoming the Blue Jays to Fenway and winning two of three games against them.

To finish off June, the Red Sox set out on a seven-game western road swing beginning with the first three games of a four-game series against the Seattle Mariners at Safeco Field in Seattle, having amassed a 1–2 record in the series before entering July.

=== July ===
The BoSox opened the month of July by ending the four-game Seattle series with a victory on July 1. The club traveled down the coast to Oakland, where they were swept by the Athletics in a 3-game series from July 2–4. Although they often have an afternoon home game on the Fourth of July, the Red Sox remained on the road during the holiday this season.

The Sox came home to Fenway Park to face the rival Yankees in a four-game series, which included a Saturday doubleheader created to compensate for a rained out Red Sox-Yankees game earlier in the year. The Red Sox lost 3 of 4 games against New York, dropping the Friday, Saturday afternoon, and Sunday games, and being victorious only in the Saturday night game. One bright spot for the Red Sox over the weekend was the surprising breakout performance of Pedro Ciriaco, making his debut with the Red Sox. Ciriaco amassed four hits and four RBIs in the Saturday night game, as his offensive prowess became the main storyline of the Red Sox' lone win of the series.

Boston headed into the All-Star Break at exactly .500, harboring a 43–43 record. They had gone 2–6 thus far in the month of July by that time.

In their first week after the All-Star Break, things began to pick up for the Red Sox, as they took 2 of 3 from the Rays at Tropicana Field. Returning home, the Red Sox faced a four-game series against the Chicago White Sox, the team to which fan favorite Kevin Youkilis had been traded from the Red Sox less than a month prior. Youkilis received a standing ovation in his first at bat returning to Fenway Park, and continued to receive strong applause and "Youk" calls as the series went on. Cody Ross exploded in this series, slamming two three-run home runs on July 18 against Chicago and again crushing another three-run, walk-off home run in the bottom of the ninth on July 19, vaulting the BoSox from a 1–0 deficit to a 3–1 victory. The Red Sox enjoyed this offensive prowess in spite of the loss of big hitter David Ortiz to the 15-day disabled list after injuring himself during a slide. Mauro Gómez took his place as designated hitter during his absence.

The Red Sox soon hit another bump in the road, however, getting swept in a vital intra-divisional series with Toronto, then proceeding to lose two of three to the Rangers. The Sox fell as low as 49–51 but were able to close out July with a strong surge, salvaging the Saturday and Sunday games of a weekend series against the Yankees in the Bronx after losing the Friday contest, and then winning the first two games of a three-game home series against Detroit, such that the BoSox were able to close out July on a four-game winning streak. The Sox went 12–14 in July, making it their worst month of the season thus far, but the club remained above .500 at 53–51.

=== August ===
Patch worn in memory of Johnny Pesky

The Red Sox fell into a rut yet again as they entered the season's fifth month. They opened August with four consecutive losses and by August 9 they came out victorious in only two of their last nine matchups. Beginning on August 10, the Sox began a pattern of alternating wins and losses. As of August 14, the Sox' record stood at a measly 57–60.

The club as a whole was jolted by the death of Red Sox legend Johnny Pesky on Monday, August 13, 2012, at the age of 92, in hospice care in the nearby North Shore suburb of Danvers. To honor Johnny's memory, the team added a black armband to the right sleeve of their road uniform, as well as added a black patch with a white no. 6 to their home uniform. Oddly, David Ortiz, Clay Buchholz, Vicente Padilla, and Jarrod Saltalamacchia were the only Red Sox players who attended Pesky's funeral, only for most of the team to appear at a bowling event led by pitcher Josh Beckett later that night, which angered fans, press, and front office executives alike.

On August 16, Buchholz pitched the second immaculate inning in franchise history, striking out all three Baltimore Orioles batters on a total of nine pitches in the sixth inning. After consecutive losses to the Orioles, the Sox recommenced their pattern of alternating wins and losses and traveled to Yankee Stadium for the second time in less than a month to take on the Bronx Bombers in a weekend series, which they lost, surrendering the Friday and Sunday games and salvaging only the Saturday contest.

Returning home, the Sox were swept by the Angels and ended a losing streak at four games by triumphing over Kansas City. With playoff hopes looking dim, Red Sox office management decided to look ahead to the following season by freeing up money in the payroll by performing a salary dump trade that sent Adrián González, Josh Beckett, Carl Crawford, and Nick Punto to the Dodgers in exchange for James Loney and four prospects: pitchers Allen Webster and Rubby De La Rosa, infielder Ivan De Jesus Jr., and outfielder Jerry Sands. The trade was finalized on August 25, 2012.

The Red Sox took three of four from Kansas City but relapsed into another large rut as they commenced a West Coast road trip by being swept by the Angels (since the Angels also won all three of their games at Fenway Park against the Sox a week earlier, the Angels completely swept the season series against Boston, 6 games to 0) and losing extravagantly to the Oakland Athletics on Friday, August 31, by a score of 20–2; the game was the worst loss for the Red Sox in 12 years, as former Red Sox Brandon Moss, George Kottaras, and Josh Reddick hit home runs against their former team. The Red Sox finished off an extremely shoddy August with a 9–20 record, only two wins more and the same number of losses as the Sox' infamous 7–20 record in their collapse of September 2011.

=== September and October ===
The Red Sox opened September in the middle of a weekend series against Oakland, losing their first game in September, 7–1, and losing again the following day by a score of 6–2, giving Oakland the sweep. The Athletics had previously swept the Red Sox in 2012 in July. On Labor Day, the Red Sox opened up a three-game swing in Seattle with yet another loss, bringing their losing streak to a season-worst seven games. The Red Sox came out of the spiral with a 4–3 win against Seattle on Tuesday, September 4, but the extreme damage of the losing streak and of the Sox' August 9–20 to the team's playoff hopes had already been done. The Red Sox slipped into last place in the American League East shortly afterward after being swept by the Toronto Blue Jays in a weekend series, allowing the Jays to hop over the Red Sox up to fourth place. Boston broke yet another losing streak with a bottom-ninth victory over the rival Yankees on Tuesday, September 11, in a game wherein Jacoby Ellsbury recorded a walk-off single for the 4–3 triumph.

Heading into a weekend series in Toronto, the Sox found some success, winning the three-game series by taking the first two games on Friday, September 14 and Saturday, September 15, resulting in the first consecutive victories for the BoSox since August 26–27. However, the very next day, on Sunday, September 16, the Sox fell to the Jays to put their record at 66–81, officially eliminating them, albeit unsurprisingly, from the playoff race for the third straight year.

On Wednesday, September 19, the Tampa Bay Rays defeated the Red Sox, 13–3 at Tropicana Field in St. Petersburg. As a result, the Red Sox are assured of their first losing season since 1997, when they went 78–84.

The Red Sox closed out home play with a five-game homestand at Fenway, losing four of those five games. Their last home victory of the year was a 2–1 decision against the Orioles on Sunday, September 23. Fenway hosted its final MLB game until 2013 on Wednesday, September 26, a 4–2 setback to Tampa Bay.

Embarking on a six-game road trip to close out their season, the Red Sox secured their first 90-loss season since 1966 with a loss to Baltimore on Sunday, September 30.

The Red Sox faced their archrival Yankees in the final series of the season and, fittingly, lost all three games, two of them by blowout scores of 10–2 and 14–2, and one in an extra-inning heartbreaker by a score of 4–3 after 12 innings.

Their final few weeks of the 2012 season poignantly summed up the season as a whole: the Red Sox ended the season with their eighth straight loss, and lost 12 of 13 to finish out the club's most disastrous season since the 1990s.

The 2012 season for the Red Sox was marred by injuries to key players, inconsistent play, massive unloading of players with large contracts, turmoil, and clubhouse drama featured by feuds between manager Bobby Valentine and players, feuds between Valentine and the coaching staff, and Valentine's persistent run-ins with the media.

==== Firing of Bobby Valentine and aftermath ====
On the final day of the season, it was announced that the Red Sox have plans to fire Bobby Valentine from his position as manager after this one season with him as manager of the club, according to "people familiar with the situation", as quoted from a CBS report on the issue.

On Thursday, October 4, 2012, Valentine was officially fired from the position of manager of the Boston Red Sox after one season, confirming the earlier rumors. He was replaced with Toronto Blue Jays manager John Farrell on Saturday, October 20, 2012. The Red Sox proceeded to vault back into first place the following season, winning the 2013 World Series.

=== 2012 Roster ===
2012 Boston Red Sox
Roster
Pitchers: 91 Alfredo Aceves; 32 Matt Albers; 48 Scott Atchison; 40 Andrew Bailey; 51 Daniel Bard; 54 Pedro Beato; 19 Josh Beckett; 64 Michael Bowden; 32 Craig Breslow; 11 Clay Buchholz; 52 Chris Carpenter; 35 Aaron Cook; 61 Félix Doubront; 47 Justin Germano; 53 Rich Hill; 31 Jon Lester; 18 Daisuke Matsuzaka; 37 Mark Melancon; 30 Andrew Miller; 46 Franklin Morales; 59 Clayton Mortensen; 44 Vicente Padilla; 47 Zach Stewart; 63 Junichi Tazawa; 50,78 Justin Thomas	Catchers: 60 Ryan Lavarnway; 62 Guillermo Quiróz; 39 Jarrod Saltalamacchia; 10 Kelly Shoppach; Infielders: 62 Lars Anderson; 3 Mike Avilés; 77 Pedro Ciriaco; 56 Iván DeJesús, Jr.; 50 Mauro Gomez; 28 Adrián González; 58 José Iglesias; 23 Brent Lillibridge; 22 James Loney; 64 Will Middlebrooks; 34 David Ortiz; 15 Dustin Pedroia; 5 Nick Punto; 71 Nate Spears; 23 Danny Valencia; 20 Kevin Youkilis	Outfielders: 23 Marlon Byrd; 13 Carl Crawford; 2 Jacoby Ellsbury; 55,70 Ryan Kalish; 67,85 Che-Hsuan Lin; 54 Darnell McDonald; 66 Daniel Nava; 26 Scott Podsednik; 16 Jason Repko; 7 Cody Ross; 12 Ryan Sweeney	Manager: 25 Bobby Valentine; Coaches: 17 Tim Bogar (bench); 29 Dave Magadan (hitting); 22 Bob McClure (pitching); 68 Randy Niemann (asst. pitching/interim pitching); 36 Alex Ochoa (first base); 43 Jerry Royster (third base); 57 Gary Tuck (bullpen)

== Player stats ==
=== Batting ===
Note: G = Games played; AB = At bats; R = Runs; H = Hits; 2B = Doubles; 3B = Triples; HR = Home runs; RBI = Runs batted in; SB = Stolen bases; BB = Walks; AVG = Batting average; SLG = Slugging average

Player	G	AB	R	H	2B	3B	HR	RBI	SB	BB	AVG	SLG
Dustin Pedroia	141	563	81	163	39	3	15	65	20	48	.290	.449
Mike Avilés	136	512	57	128	28	0	13	60	14	23	.250	.381
Adrián González	123	484	63	145	37	0	15	86	0	31	.300	.469
Cody Ross	130	476	70	127	34	1	22	81	2	42	.267	.481
Jarrod Saltalamacchia	121	405	55	90	17	1	25	59	0	38	.222	.454
David Ortiz	90	324	65	103	26	0	23	60	0	56	.318	.611
Jacoby Ellsbury	74	303	43	82	18	0	4	26	14	19	.271	.370
Will Middlebrooks	75	267	34	77	14	0	15	54	4	13	.288	.509
Daniel Nava	88	267	38	65	21	0	6	33	3	37	.243	.390
Pedro Ciriaco	76	259	33	76	15	2	2	19	16	8	.293	.390
Ryan Sweeney	63	204	22	53	19	2	0	16	0	12	.260	.373
Scott Podsednik	63	199	19	60	7	0	1	12	8	6	.302	.352
Ryan Lavarnway	46	153	11	24	8	0	2	12	0	11	.157	.248
Kevin Youkilis	42	146	25	34	7	1	4	14	0	14	.233	.377
Kelly Shoppach	48	140	16	35	12	2	5	17	1	11	.250	.471
Nick Punto	65	125	14	25	6	0	1	10	5	19	.200	.272
Carl Crawford	31	117	23	33	10	2	3	19	5	3	.282	.479
Mauro Gómez	37	102	14	28	5	2	2	17	0	8	.275	.422
James Loney	30	100	5	23	2	0	2	8	0	5	.230	.310
Marlon Byrd	34	100	9	27	2	0	1	7	0	2	.270	.320
Ryan Kalish	36	96	12	22	3	0	0	5	3	6	.229	.260
Darnell McDonald	38	84	17	18	7	0	2	9	1	12	.214	.369
José Iglesias	25	68	5	8	2	0	1	2	1	4	.118	.191
Danny Valencia	10	28	1	4	0	0	1	4	0	0	.143	.250
Brent Lillibridge	10	16	0	2	0	0	0	0	0	0	.125	.125
Che-Hsuan Lin	9	12	1	3	0	0	0	0	0	0	.250	.250
Jason Repko	5	11	0	1	0	0	0	0	0	0	.091	.091
Lars Anderson	6	8	1	1	0	0	0	0	0	0	.125	.125
Iván De Jesús Jr.	8	8	0	0	0	0	0	0	0	0	.000	.000
Nate Spears	4	4	0	0	0	0	0	0	0	0	.000	.000
Guillermo Quiróz	2	2	0	0	0	0	0	0	0	0	.000	.000
Pitcher totals	162	21	0	2	0	0	0	0	0	0	.095	.095
**Team totals**	**162**	**5604**	**734**	**1459**	**339**	**16**	**165**	**695**	**97**	**428**	**.260**	**.415**

=== Pitching ===
Note: W = Wins; L = Losses; ERA = Earned run average; G = Games pitched; GS = Games started; SV = Saves; IP = Innings pitched; H = Hits allowed; R = Runs allowed; ER = Earned runs allowed; BB = Walks allowed; SO = Strikeouts

Player	W	L	ERA	G	GS	SV	IP	H	R	ER	BB	SO
Jon Lester	9	14	4.82	33	33	0	205.1	216	117	110	68	166
Clay Buchholz	11	8	4.56	29	29	0	189.1	187	104	96	64	129
Félix Doubront	11	10	4.86	29	29	0	161.0	162	95	87	71	167
Josh Beckett	5	11	5.23	21	21	0	127.1	131	75	74	38	94
Aaron Cook	4	11	5.65	18	18	0	94.0	117	68	59	21	20
Alfredo Aceves	2	10	5.36	69	0	25	84.0	80	51	50	31	75
Franklin Morales	3	4	3.77	37	9	1	76.1	64	38	32	30	76
Daniel Bard	5	6	6.22	17	10	0	59.1	60	42	41	43	38
Scott Atchison	2	1	1.58	42	0	0	51.1	42	10	9	9	36
Vicente Padilla	4	1	4.50	56	0	1	50.0	59	26	25	15	51
Daisuke Matsuzaka	1	7	8.28	11	11	0	45.2	58	43	42	20	41
Mark Melancon	0	2	6.20	41	0	1	45.0	45	31	31	12	41
Junichi Tazawa	1	1	1.43	37	0	1	44.0	37	7	7	5	45
Clayton Mortensen	1	1	3.21	26	0	0	42.0	32	15	15	19	41
Andrew Miller	3	2	3.35	53	0	0	40.1	28	15	15	20	51
Matt Albers	2	0	2.29	40	0	0	39.1	30	14	10	15	25
Craig Breslow	1	0	2.70	23	0	0	20.0	14	7	6	9	19
Rich Hill	1	0	1.83	25	0	0	19.2	17	4	4	11	21
Andrew Bailey	1	1	7.04	19	0	6	15.1	21	12	12	8	14
Pedro Beato	1	0	4.70	4	0	0	7.2	6	4	4	3	7
Chris Carpenter	1	0	9.00	8	0	0	6.0	7	6	6	10	2
Zach Stewart	0	2	22.24	2	2	0	5.2	17	14	14	0	3
Justin Germano	0	0	0.00	1	0	0	5.2	5	0	0	2	7
Justin Thomas	0	0	7.71	7	0	0	4.2	10	4	4	2	4
Michael Bowden	0	0	3.00	2	0	0	3.0	2	1	1	1	3
Darnell McDonald	0	1	27.00	1	0	0	1.0	2	3	3	2	0
**Team totals**	**69**	**93**	**4.70**	**162**	**162**	**35**	**1443.0**	**1449**	**806**	**754**	**529**	**1176**

=== Game log ===
Red Sox Win	Red Sox Loss	Game postponed	Eliminated from Playoff Race
Boldface text denotes a Red Sox pitcher

Boston Red Sox 2012 Season Game Log — Season Record: (69–93), 5th in AL East
April (11–11)

#	Date	Opponent	Score	Win	Loss	Save	Stadium	Attendance	Record	Box/ Streak
1	April 5	@ Tigers	2–3	Valverde (1–0)	**Melancon** (0–1)		Comerica Park	45,027	0–1	L1
2	April 7	@ Tigers	0–10	Below (1–0)	**Beckett** (0–1)		Comerica Park	44,710	0–2	L2
3	April 8	@ Tigers	12–13 (11)	Below (2–0)	**Melancon** (0–2)		Comerica Park	30,788	0–3	L3
4	April 9	@ Blue Jays	4–2	**Atchison** (1–0)	Santos (0–1)	**Aceves** (1)	Rogers Centre	48,473	1–3	W1
5	April 10	@ Blue Jays	3–7	Drabek (1–0)	**Bard** (0–1)		Rogers Centre	26,351	1–4	L1
6	April 11	@ Blue Jays	1–3	Romero (1–0)	**Lester** (0–1)	Santos (1)	Rogers Centre	25,285	1–5	L2
7	April 13	Rays	12–2	**Beckett** (1–1)	Price (1–1)		**Fenway Park**	37,032	2–5	W1
8	April 14	Rays	13–5	**Buchholz** (1–0)	Badenhop (0–1)		**Fenway Park**	38,024	3–5	W2
9	April 15	Rays	6–4	**Padilla** (1–0)	Moore (0–1)	**Aceves** (2)	**Fenway Park**	38,024	4–5	W3
10	April 16	Rays	0–1	Shields (2–0)	**Bard** (0–2)	Rodney (4)	**Fenway Park**	38,108	4–6	L1
11	April 17	Rangers	3–18	Lewis (2–0)	**Lester** (0–2)		**Fenway Park**	38,229	4–7	L2
12	April 18	Rangers	3–6	Holland (2–0)	**Beckett** (1–2)		**Fenway Park**	37,967	4–8	L3
13	April 20	Yankees	2–6	Nova (3–0)	**Buchholz** (1–1)		**Fenway Park**	36,770	4–9	L4
14	April 21	Yankees	9–15	Soriano (2–0)	**Aceves** (0–1)		**Fenway Park**	37,839	4–10	L5
	April 22	Yankees	Postponed (rain) Rescheduled for July 7 as part of a double-header							
15	April 23	@ Twins	6–5	**Bard** (1–2)	Capps (0–1)	**Aceves** (3)	Target Field	32,351	5–10	W1
16	April 24	@ Twins	11–2	**Beckett** (2–2)	Blackburn (0–2)		Target Field	33,651	6–10	W2
17	April 25	@ Twins	7–6	**Buchholz** (1–2)	Hendriks (0–1)	**Aceves** (4)	Target Field	32,254	7–10	W3
18	April 26	@ White Sox	10–3	**Doubront** (1–0)	Humber (1–1)	**Tazawa** (1)	U.S. Cellular Field	20,266	8–10	W4
19	April 27	@ White Sox	10–3	**Bard** (2–2)	Danks (2–3)		U.S. Cellular Field	20,414	9–10	W5
20	April 28	@ White Sox	1–0	**Lester** (1–2)	Peavy (3–1)	**Aceves** (5)	U.S. Cellular Field	20,057	10–10	W6
21	April 29	@ White Sox	1–4	Floyd (2–3)	**Beckett** (2–3)	Thornton (1)	U.S. Cellular Field	22,811	10–11	L1
22	April 30	Athletics	11–6	**Buchholz** (3–1)	Milone (3–2)		**Fenway Park**	37,359	11–11	W1

May (15–14)

#	Date	Opponent	Score	Win	Loss	Save	Stadium	Attendance	Record	Box/ Streak
23	May 1	Athletics	3–5	Parker (1–0)	**Doubront** (1–1)	Norberto (1)	**Fenway Park**	37,225	11–12	L1
24	May 2	Athletics	2–4	McCarthy (2–3)	**Bard** (2–3)	Fuentes (1)	**Fenway Park**	37,434	11–13	L2
25	May 4	Orioles	4–6 (13)	Patton (1–0)	**Morales** (0–1)	Johnson (8)	**Fenway Park**	37,223	11–14	L3
26	May 5	Orioles	2–8	Hammel (4–1)	**Cook** (0–1)		**Fenway Park**	37,581	11–15	L4
27	May 6	Orioles	6–9 (17)	Davis (1–0)	**McDonald** (0–1)		**Fenway Park**	37,394	11–16	L5
28	May 7	@ Royals	11–5	**Doubront** (2–1)	Sánchez (1–2)	**Padilla** (1)	Kauffman Stadium	19,502	12–16	W1
29	May 8	@ Royals	4–6	Mijares (2–1)	**Bard** (2–4)	Broxton (6)	Kauffman Stadium	20,524	12–17	L1
30	May 9	@ Royals	3–4	Chen (1–4)	**Lester** (1–3)	Broxton (7)	Kauffman Stadium	18,339	12–18	L2
31	May 10	Indians	3–8	Lowe (5–1)	**Beckett** (2–4)		**Fenway Park**	37,348	12–19	L3
32	May 11	Indians	7–5	**Buchholz** (4–1)	Jiménez (3–3)	**Aceves** (6)	**Fenway Park**	37,438	13–19	W1
33	May 12	Indians	4–1	**Doubront** (3–1)	McAllister (1–1)	**Aceves** (7)	**Fenway Park**	38,048	14–19	W2
34	May 13	Indians	12–1	**Bard** (3–4)	Masterson (1–2)		**Fenway Park**	37,611	15–19	W3
35	May 14	Mariners	6–1	**Lester** (2–3)	Vargas (4–3)		**Fenway Park**	37,334	16–19	W4
36	May 15	Mariners	5–0	**Beckett** (3–4)	Beavan (1–4)		**Fenway Park**	37,292	17–19	W5
37	May 16	@ Rays	1–2	Hellickson (4–0)	**Buchholz** (4–2)	Rodney (12)	Tropicana Field	20,843	17–20	L1
38	May 17	@ Rays	5–3	**Doubront** (4–1)	Moore (1–4)	**Aceves** (8)	Tropicana Field	19,842	18–20	W1
39	May 18	@ Phillies	4–6	Hamels (6–1)	**Bard** (3–5)	Papelbon (12)	Citizens Bank Park	45,205	18–21	L1
40	May 19	@ Phillies	7–5	**Lester** (3–3)	Blanton (4–4)	**Aceves** (9)	Citizens Bank Park	45,656	19–21	W1
41	May 20	@ Phillies	5–1	**Beckett** (4–4)	Lee (0–2)		Citizens Bank Park	45,586	20–21	W2
42	May 21	@ Orioles	8–6	**Miller** (1–0)	Gregg (2–2)	**Aceves** (10)	Camden Yards	16,392	21–21	W3
43	May 22	@ Orioles	1–4	Matusz (4–4)	**Doubront** (4–2)	Johnson (16)	Camden Yards	25,171	21–22	L1
44	May 23	@ Orioles	6–5	**Bard** (4–5)	Arrieta (2–5)	**Aceves** (11)	Camden Yards	27,806	22–22	W1
45	May 25	Rays	4–7	Cobb (2–0)	**Lester** (3–4)	Rodney (15)	**Fenway Park**	37,594	22–23	L1
46	May 26	Rays	3–2	**Hill** (1–0)	Rodney (2–1)		**Fenway Park**	38,099	23–23	W1
47	May 27	Rays	3–4	McGee (2–1)	**Aceves** (0–2)	Rodney (16)	**Fenway Park**	37,844	23–24	L1
48	May 28	Tigers	7–4	**Doubront** (5–2)	Fister (0–3)		**Fenway Park**	37,921	24–24	W1
49	May 29	Tigers	6–3	**Bard** (5–5)	Verlander (5–3)	**Aceves** (12)	**Fenway Park**	37,216	25–24	W2
50	May 30	Tigers	6–4	**Albers** (1–0)	Dotel (1–2)	**Aceves** (13)	**Fenway Park**	37,195	26–24	W3
51	May 31	Tigers	3–7	Scherzer (5–3)	**Beckett** (4–5)		**Fenway Park**	37,629	26–25	L1

June (15–12)

#	Date	Opponent	Score	Win	Loss	Save	Stadium	Attendance	Record	Box/ Streak
52	June 1	@ Blue Jays	7–2	**Buchholz** (5–2)	Álvarez (3–5)		Rogers Centre	29,678	27–25	W1
53	June 2	@ Blue Jays	7–4	**Doubront** (6–2)	Drabek (4–6)	**Aceves** (14)	Rogers Centre	43,390	28–25	W2
54	June 3	@ Blue Jays	1–5	Hutchison (5–2)	**Bard** (5–6)		Rogers Centre	41,925	28–26	L1
55	June 5	Orioles	6–8 (10)	Johnson (1–0)	**Aceves** (0–3)		**Fenway Park**	37,181	28–27	L2
56	June 6	Orioles	1–2	Chen (5–2)	**Beckett** (4–6)	Johnson (18)	**Fenway Park**	37,243	28–28	L3
57	June 7	Orioles	7–0	**Buchholz** (6–2)	Matusz (5–6)		**Fenway Park**	37,307	29–28	W1
58	June 8	Nationals	4–7	Strasburg (7–1)	**Doubront** (6–3)	Clippard (6)	**Fenway Park**	37,309	29–29	L1
59	June 9	Nationals	2–4	González (8–2)	**Matsuzaka** (0–1)	Clippard (7)	**Fenway Park**	37,534	29–30	L2
60	June 10	Nationals	3–4	Gorzelanny (2–1)	**Aceves** (0–4)	Clippard (8)	**Fenway Park**	37,467	29–31	L3
61	June 11	@ Marlins	1–4	Johnson (4–4)	**Beckett** (4–7)	Bell (13)	Marlins Park	32,562	29–32	L4
62	June 12	@ Marlins	2–1	**Buchholz** (7–2)	Buehrle (5–7)	**Aceves** (15)	Marlins Park	29,326	30–32	W1
63	June 13	@ Marlins	10–2	**Doubront** (7–3)	Nolasco (6–5)		Marlins Park	33,119	31–32	W2
64	June 15	@ Cubs	0–3	Dempster (3–3)	**Matsuzaka** (0–2)	Mármol (3)	Wrigley Field	40,073	31–33	L1
65	June 16	@ Cubs	4–3	**Lester** (4–4)	Samardzija (5–5)	**Aceves** (16)	Wrigley Field	40,766	32–33	W1
66	June 17	@ Cubs	7–4	**Albers** (2–0)	Camp (2–4)		Wrigley Field	38,531	33–33	W2
67	June 19	Marlins	7–5	**Buchholz** (8–2)	Buehrle (5–8)	**Aceves** (17)	**Fenway Park**	37,701	34–33	W3
68	June 20	Marlins	15–5	**Doubront** (8–3)	Nolasco (6–6)		**Fenway Park**	37,362	35–33	W4
69	June 21	Marlins	6–5	**Atchison** (2–0)	Mujica (0–3)	**Aceves** (18)	**Fenway Park**	37,261	36–33	W5
70	June 22	Braves	1–4	Jurrjens (1–2)	**Lester** (4–5)	Kimbrel (21)	**Fenway Park**	37,281	36–34	L1
71	June 23	Braves	8–4	**Morales** (1–1)	Delgado (4–8)		**Fenway Park**	37,782	37–34	W1
72	June 24	Braves	9–4	**Cook** (1–1)	Minor (3–6)		**Fenway Park**	37,565	38–34	W2
73	June 25	Blue Jays	6–9	Álvarez (4–6)	**Doubront** (8–4)	Janssen (8)	**Fenway Park**	37,208	38–35	L1
74	June 26	Blue Jays	5–1	**Miller** (2–0)	Pérez (2–2)		**Fenway Park**	37,755	39–35	W1
75	June 27	Blue Jays	10–4	**Lester** (5–5)	Romero (8–2)		**Fenway Park**	37,744	40–35	W2
76	June 28	@ Mariners	0–1	Hernández (6–5)	**Atchison** (2–1)		Safeco Field	20,692	40–36	L1
77	June 29	@ Mariners	5–0	**Cook** (2–1)	Noesí (2–10)		Safeco Field	23,094	41–36	W1
78	June 30	@ Mariners	2–3 (11)	Kelley (2–2)	**Aceves** (0–5)		Safeco Field	31,311	41–37	L1

July (12–14)

#	Date	Opponent	Score	Win	Loss	Save	Stadium	Attendance	Record	Box/ Streak
79	July 1	@ Mariners	2–1 (10)	**Padilla** (2–0)	League (0–5)	**Aceves** (19)	Safeco Field	34,065	42–37	W1
80	July 2	@ Athletics	1–6	Parker (5–3)	**Matsuzaka** (0–3)		O.co Coliseum	17,434	42–38	L1
81	July 3	@ Athletics	2–3	Blevins (2–0)	**Aceves** (0–6)		O.co Coliseum	35,067	42–39	L2
82	July 4	@ Athletics	2–3	Balfour (2–2)	**Cook** (2–2)	Cook (8)	O.co Coliseum	28,240	42–40	L3
83	July 6	Yankees	8–10	Logan (4–0)	**Miller** (2–1)	Soriano (20)	**Fenway Park**	38,066	42–41	L4
84	July 7	Yankees	1–6	García (3–2)	**Morales** (1–2)		**Fenway Park**	38,170	42–42	L5
85	July 7	Yankees	9–5	**Doubront** (9–4)	Hughes (9–7)		**Fenway Park**	37,791	43–42	W1
86	July 8	Yankees	3–7	Nova (10–3)	**Lester** (5–6)		**Fenway Park**	38,270	43–43	L1
July 10		All-Star Game	NL 8–0 AL	Matt Cain; NL, (SF)	Justin Verlander AL, (DET)		Kauffman Stadium	40,933	Kansas City, MO	
87	July 13	@ Rays	3–1	**Morales** (2–2)	Hellickson (4–6)	**Aceves** (20)	Tropicana Field	29,089	44–43	W1
88	July 14	@ Rays	3–5	Price (12–4)	**Buchholz** (8–3)	Rodney (26)	Tropicana Field	27,311	44–44	L1
89	July 15	@ Rays	7–3	**Beckett** (5–7)	Shields (8–6)		Tropicana Field	26,131	45–44	W1
90	July 16	White Sox	5–1	**Padilla** (3–0)	Séptimo (0–1)		**Fenway Park**	38,334	46–44	W2
91	July 17	White Sox	5–7	Humber (4–4)	**Lester** (5–7)	Reed (15)	**Fenway Park**	37,771	46–45	L1
92	July 18	White Sox	10–1	**Doubront** (10–4)	Hernández (0–1)		**Fenway Park**	37,367	47–45	W1
93	July 19	White Sox	3–1	**Aceves** (1–6)	Thornton (2–6)		**Fenway Park**	38,414	48–45	W2
94	July 20	Blue Jays	1–6	Laffey (2–1)	**Beckett** (5–8)		**Fenway Park**	38,093	48–46	L1
95	July 21	Blue Jays	3–7	Villanueva (5–0)	**Cook** (2–3)		**Fenway Park**	38,170	48–47	L2
96	July 22	Blue Jays	7–15	Álvarez (6–7)	**Lester** (5–8)		**Fenway Park**	37,737	48–48	L3
97	July 23	@ Rangers	1–9	Feldman (4–6)	**Doubront** (10–5)		Rangers Ballpark	44,132	48–49	L4
98	July 24	@ Rangers	2–1	**Padilla** (4–0)	Nathan (1–3)	**Aceves** (21)	Rangers Ballpark	41,237	49–49	W1
99	July 25	@ Rangers	3–5	Holland (7–5)	**Beckett** (5–9)	Nathan (20)	Rangers Ballpark	44,104	49–50	L1
100	July 27	@ Yankees	3–10	Hughes (10–8)	**Cook** (2–4)		Yankee Stadium	49,571	49–51	L2
101	July 28	@ Yankees	8–6	**Miller** (3–1)	Soriano (2–1)	**Aceves** (22)	Yankee Stadium	49,573	50–51	W1
102	July 29	@ Yankees	3–2 (10)	**Aceves** (2–6)	Robertson (1–4)		Yankee Stadium	48,526	51–51	W2
103	July 30	Tigers	7–3	**Buchholz** (9–3)	Scherzer (10–6)		**Fenway Park**	37,784	52–51	W3
104	July 31	Tigers	4–1 (6)	**Mortensen** (1–0)	Verlander (11–7)	**Morales** (1)	**Fenway Park**	37,275	53–51	W4

August (9–20)

#	Date	Opponent	Score	Win	Loss	Save	Stadium	Attendance	Record	Box/ Streak
105	August 1	Tigers	5–7	Porcello (8–6)	**Cook** (2–5)	Valverde (21)	**Fenway Park**	37,213	53–52	L1
106	August 2	Twins	0–5	Deduno (3–0)	**Lester** (5–9)	Perkins (6)	**Fenway Park**	37,191	53–53	L2
107	August 3	Twins	5–6 (10)	Gray (6–1)	**Padilla** (4–1)	Burton (4)	**Fenway Park**	37,285	53–54	L3
108	August 4	Twins	4–6	Burnett (4–3)	**Aceves** (2–7)	Burton (5)	**Fenway Park**	37,914	53–55	L4
109	August 5	Twins	6–4	**Morales** (3–2)	Blackburn (4–7)	**Aceves** (23)	**Fenway Park**	37,019	54–55	W1
110	August 6	Rangers	9–2	**Cook** (3–5)	Darvish (11–8)		**Fenway Park**	37,316	55–55	W2
111	August 7	Rangers	3–6	Dempster (6–5)	**Lester** (5–10)	Nathan (22)	**Fenway Park**	38,416	55–56	L1
112	August 8	Rangers	9–10	Ogando (2–0)	**Mortensen** (1–1)	Nathan (23)	**Fenway Park**	37,716	55–57	L2
113	August 9	@ Indians	3–5	Jiménez (9–11)	**Doubront** (10–6)	Perez (30)	Progressive Field	19,639	55–58	L3
114	August 10	@ Indians	3–2	**Buchholz** (10–3)	Seddon (0–1)		Progressive Field	27,246	56–58	W1
115	August 11	@ Indians	2–5	McAllister (5–4)	**Morales** (3–3)	Perez (31)	Progressive Field	27,894	56–59	L1
116	August 12	@ Indians	14–1	**Lester** (6–10)	Kluber (0–1)		Progressive Field	27,488	57–59	W1
117	August 14	@ Orioles	1–7	Chen (11–7)	**Beckett** (5–10)		Camden Yards	26,204	57–60	L1
118	August 15	@ Orioles	3–5	González (5–2)	**Cook** (3–6)	Johnson (35)	Camden Yards	22,269	57–61	L2
119	August 16	@ Orioles	6–3	**Buchholz** (11–3)	Ayala (4–4)	**Aceves** (24)	Camden Yards	25,483	58–61	W1
120	August 17	@ Yankees	4–6	Hughes (12–10)	**Morales** (3–4)	Soriano (30)	Yankee Stadium	49,422	58–62	L1
121	August 18	@ Yankees	4–1	**Lester** (7–10)	Phelps (3–4)	**Aceves** (25)	Yankee Stadium	49,466	59–62	W1
122	August 19	@ Yankees	1–4	Kuroda (12–8)	**Beckett** (5–11)	Soriano (31)	Yankee Stadium	48,620	59–63	L1
123	August 21	Angels	3–5	Santana (7–10)	**Cook** (3–7)	Frieri (15)	**Fenway Park**	37,794	59–64	L2
124	August 22	Angels	3–7	Weaver (16–3)	**Buchholz** (11–4)		**Fenway Park**	37,373	59–65	L3
125	August 23	Angels	13–14 (10)	Frieri (3–0)	**Aceves** (2–8)		**Fenway Park**	37,829	59–66	L4
126	August 24	Royals	4–3	**Lester** (8–10)	Herrera (1–2)	**Bailey** (1)	**Fenway Park**	37,228	60–66	W1
127	August 25	Royals	9–10 (12)	Bueno (1–0)	**Tazawa** (0–1)	Holland (7)	**Fenway Park**	37,103	60–67	L1
128	August 26	Royals	8–6	**Beato** (1–0)	Smith (4–6)	**Melancon** (1)	**Fenway Park**	37,188	61–67	W1
129	August 27	Royals	5–1	**Matsuzaka** (1–3)	Hochevar (7–12)		**Fenway Park**	37,506	62–67	W2
130	August 28	@ Angels	5–6	Jepsen (3–2)	**Aceves** (2–9)		Angel Stadium	38,745	62–68	L1
131	August 29	@ Angels	3–10	Wilson (10–9)	**Stewart** (1–3)		Angel Stadium	37,841	62–69	L2
132	August 30	@ Angels	2–5	Greinke (12–5)	**Lester** (8–11)	Frieri (16)	Angel Stadium	39,013	62–70	L3
133	August 31	@ Athletics	2–20	McCarthy (8–5)	**Cook** (3–8)		O.co Coliseum	20,121	62–71	L4

September / October (7–22)

#	Date	Opponent	Score	Win	Loss	Save	Stadium	Attendance	Record	Box/ Streak
134	September 1	@ Athletics	1–7	Griffin (4–0)	**Doubront** (10–7)		O.co Coliseum	20,315	62–72	L5
135	September 2	@ Athletics	2–6	Anderson (3–0)	**Matsuzaka** (1–4)		O.co Coliseum	25,314	62–73	L6
136	September 3	@ Mariners	1–4	Vargas (14–9)	**Buchholz** (11–5)	Wilhelmsen (23)	Safeco Field	21,641	62–74	L7
137	September 4	@ Mariners	4–3	**Lester** (9–11)	Beavan (9–9)	**Bailey** (2)	Safeco Field	12,754	63–74	W1
138	September 5	@ Mariners	1–2	Millwood (5–12)	**Cook** (3–9)	Wilhelmsen (24)	Safeco Field	13,037	63–75	L1
139	September 7	Blue Jays	5–7	Álvarez (8–12)	**Doubront** (10–8)		**Fenway Park**	37,156	63–76	L2
140	September 8	Blue Jays	2–9	Lincoln (5–2)	**Matsuzaka** (1–5)		**Fenway Park**	37,107	63–77	L3
141	September 9	Blue Jays	3–4	Lyon (2–2)	**Buchholz** (11–6)	Janssen (20)	**Fenway Park**	37,226	63–78	L4
142	September 11	Yankees	4–3	**Bailey** (1–0)	Robertson (1–7)		**Fenway Park**	37,437	64–78	W1
143	September 12	Yankees	4–5	Phelps (4–4)	**Cook** (3–10)	Soriano (37)	**Fenway Park**	37,230	64–79	L1
144	September 13	Yankees	0–2	Hughes (15–12)	**Doubront** (10–9)	Soriano (38)	**Fenway Park**	38,134	64–80	L2
145	September 14	@ Blue Jays	8–5	**Carpenter** (1–0)	Oliver (3–3)	**Bailey** (3)	Rogers Centre	21,888	65–80	W1
146	September 15	@ Blue Jays	3–2	**Breslow** (3–0)	Delabar (4–2)	**Bailey** (4)	Rogers Centre	27,325	66–80	W2
147	September 16	@ Blue Jays	0–5	Lyon (3–2)	**Lester** (9–12)		Rogers Centre	21,698	66–81	L1
148	September 17	@ Rays	5–2	**Cook** (4–10)	Cobb (9–9)		Tropicana Field	11,722	67–81	W1
149	September 18	@ Rays	7–5	**Doubront** (11–9)	Farnsworth (1–6)	**Bailey** (5)	Tropicana Field	11,502	68–81	W2
150	September 19	@ Rays	3–13	Archer (1–3)	**Matsuzaka** (1–6)		Tropicana Field	12,708	68–82	L1
151	September 20	@ Rays	4–7	Badenhop (2–2)	**Bailey** (1–1)		Tropicana Field	12,963	68–83	L2
152	September 21	Orioles	2–4	González (7–4)	**Lester** (9–13)	Johnson (46)	**Fenway Park**	37,731	68–84	L3
153	September 22	Orioles	6–9 (12)	Hunter (6–8)	**Aceves** (2–10)	Johnson (47)	**Fenway Park**	37,570	68–85	L4
154	September 23	Orioles	2–1	**Tazawa** (1–1)	Ayala (5–5)	**Bailey** (6)	**Fenway Park**	37,310	69–85	W1
155	September 25	Rays	2–5	Price (19–5)	**Buchholz** (11–7)		**Fenway Park**	37,045	69–86	L1
156	September 26	Rays	2–4	Cobb (10–9)	**Lester** (9–14)	Rodney (45)	**Fenway Park**	37,247	69–87	L2
157	September 28	@ Orioles	1–9	Tillman (9–2)	**Cook** (4–11)		Camden Yards	33,518	69–88	L3
158	September 29	@ Orioles	3–4	Hunter (7–8)	**Doubront** (11–10)	Johnson (49)	Camden Yards	46,311	69–89	L4
159	September 30	@ Orioles	3–6	Saunders (9–13)	**Stewart** (1–4)	Johnson (50)	Camden Yards	41,257	69–90	L5
160	October 1	@ Yankees	2–10	Sabathia (15–6)	**Buchholz** (11–8)		Yankee Stadium	45,478	69–91	L6
161	October 2	@ Yankees	3–4 (12)	Lowe (9–11)	**Miller** (3–2)		Yankee Stadium	41,564	69–92	L7
162	October 3	@ Yankees	2–14	Kuroda (16–11)	**Matsuzaka** (1–7)		Yankee Stadium	47,393	69–93	L8

=== Season standings ===
==== American League East ====
AL East
Team	W	L	Pct.	GB	Home	Road
New York Yankees	95	67	.586	—	51‍–‍30	44‍–‍37
Baltimore Orioles	93	69	.574	2	47‍–‍34	46‍–‍35
Tampa Bay Rays	90	72	.556	5	46‍–‍35	44‍–‍37
Toronto Blue Jays	73	89	.451	22	41‍–‍40	32‍–‍49
Boston Red Sox	69	93	.426	26	34‍–‍47	35‍–‍46

==== American League Wild Card ====
Division winners
Team	W	L	Pct.
New York Yankees	95	67	.586
Oakland Athletics	94	68	.580
Detroit Tigers	88	74	.543

Wild Card teams (Top 2 teams qualify for postseason)
Team	W	L	Pct.	GB
Texas Rangers	93	69	.574	—
Baltimore Orioles	93	69	.574	—
Tampa Bay Rays	90	72	.556	3
Los Angeles Angels	89	73	.549	4
Chicago White Sox	85	77	.525	8
Seattle Mariners	75	87	.463	18
Toronto Blue Jays	73	89	.451	20
Kansas City Royals	72	90	.444	21
Boston Red Sox	69	93	.426	24
Cleveland Indians	68	94	.420	25
Minnesota Twins	66	96	.407	27

=== Record vs. opponents ===
2012 American League record Source: MLB Standings Grid – 2012
Team	BAL	BOS	CWS	CLE	DET	KC	LAA	MIN	NYY	OAK	SEA	TB	TEX	TOR	NL
Baltimore	–	13–5	6–2	4–4	3–3	5–4	2–7	5–2	9–9	4–5	8–1	10–8	2–5	11–7	11–7
Boston	5–13	–	6–2	5–3	5–5	4–3	0–6	4–3	5–13	1–8	5–4	9–9	2–6	7–11	11–7
Chicago	2–6	2–6	–	11–7	6–12	6–12	3–5	14–4	5–2	3–3	8–1	4–3	6–3	6–4	9–9
Cleveland	4–4	3–5	7–11	–	10–8	8–10	5–4	6–12	1–5	2–8	4–4	4–4	4–5	2–4	8–10
Detroit	3–3	5–5	12–6	8–10	–	13–5	5–5	10–8	4–6	4–3	1–5	5–2	3–7	4–2	11–7
Kansas City	4–5	3–4	12–6	10–8	5–13	–	4–5	7–11	3–4	5–4	1–7	4–2	4–5	2–6	8–10
Los Angeles	7–2	6–0	5–3	4–5	5–5	5–4	–	6–3	4–5	9–10	11–8	1–9	10–9	4–4	12–6
Minnesota	2–5	3–4	4–14	12–6	8–10	11–7	3–6	–	3–4	4–5	2–8	1–5	2–8	2–5	9–9
New York	9–9	13–5	2–5	5–1	6–4	4–3	5–4	4–3	–	5–5	6–3	8–10	4–3	11–7	13–5
Oakland	5–4	8–1	3–3	8–2	3–4	4–5	10–9	5–4	5–5	–	12–7	5–4	11–8	5–4	10–8
Seattle	1–8	4–5	1–8	4–4	5–1	7–1	8–11	8–2	3–6	7–12	–	4–6	9–10	6–3	8–10
Tampa Bay	8–10	9–9	3–4	4–4	2–5	2–4	9–1	5–1	10–8	4–5	6–4	–	5–4	14–4	9–9
Texas	5–2	6–2	3–6	5–4	7–3	5–4	9–10	8–2	3–4	8–11	10–9	4–5	–	6–3	14–4
Toronto	7–11	11–7	4–6	4–2	2–4	6–2	4–4	5–2	7–11	4–5	3–6	4–14	3–6	–	9–9

- Source: MLB Standings Grid – 2012

Red Sox vs. National League
Team	NL East					
Team	ATL	MIA	NYM	PHI	WSH	CHC
**Boston**	2–1	5–1	—	2–1	0–3	2–1

== Awards and honors ==
- Adrián González – AL Player of the Week (July 16–22, August 6–12)
- Will Middlebrooks – AL Player of the Week (June 18–24)
- Andrew Miller – Boston Red Sox Fireman of the Year

All-Star Game

- David Ortiz, starting DH

== Farm system ==
Level	Team	League	Manager
AAA	Pawtucket Red Sox	International League	Arnie Beyeler
AA	Portland Sea Dogs	Eastern League	Kevin Boles
A-Advanced	Salem Red Sox	Carolina League	Billy McMillon
A	Greenville Drive	South Atlantic League	Carlos Febles
A-Short Season	Lowell Spinners	New York–Penn League	Bruce Crabbe
Rookie	GCL Red Sox	Gulf Coast League	George Lombard
Rookie	DSL Red Sox	Dominican Summer League	José Zapata

LEAGUE CHAMPIONS: Pawtucket
