= Middlebrooks =

Middlebrooks is a surname. Notable people with the name include:

- C. Edward Middlebrooks (born 1955), American politician from Maryland
- Donald M. Middlebrooks (born 1946), United States District Court judge
- Donald Ray Middlebrooks (born 1962), American death row inmate convicted of the murder of Kerrick Majors
- David Lycurgus Middlebrooks, Jr. (born 1926), United States federal judge
- Felicia Middlebrooks (born 1957), American radio news broadcaster
- Levy Middlebrooks (born 1966), American basketball player
- Will Middlebrooks (born 1988), American professional baseball player
- Willie Middlebrooks (born 1979), American gridiron football player
- Windell Middlebrooks (1979–2015), American actor and singer

== Fictional character ==
- Craig Middlebrooks, from the NBC sitcom Parks and Recreation

== See also ==
- Middlebrook (disambiguation)
  - Middlebrook (surname)
