= Che-Hsuan Lin =

Taiwanese baseball player (born 1988)

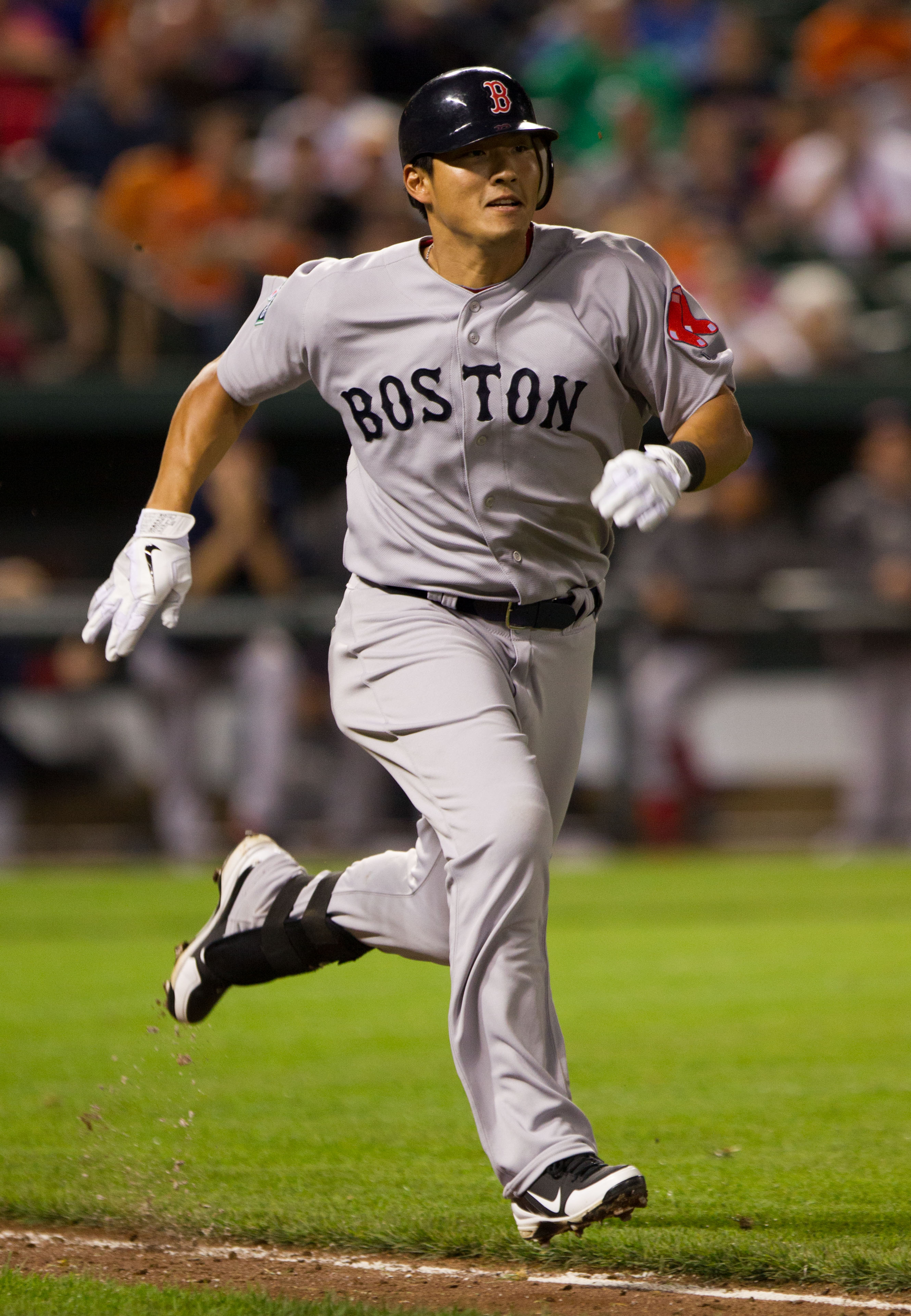
- Lin with the Boston Red Sox in 2012

Fubon Guardians – No. 1
- Outfielder / Coach
- Born: September 21, 1988 (age 37); Hualien County, Taiwan
- Batted: Right Threw: Right

Professional debut
- MLB: April 14, 2012, for the Boston Red Sox
- CPBL: August 14, 2015, for the EDA Rhinos

Last appearance
- MLB: October 1, 2012, for the Boston Red Sox
- CPBL: October 1, 2025, for the Fubon Guardians

MLB statistics
- Batting average: .250
- Home runs: 0
- Runs batted in: 0

CPBL statistics
- Batting average: .279
- Home runs: 64
- Runs batted in: 342
- Stats at Baseball Reference

Teams
- Boston Red Sox (2012); EDA Rhinos / Fubon Guardians (2015–2025)

Career highlights and awards
- Taiwan Series champion (2016); Taiwan Series MVP (2016)

Che-Hsuan Lin (Chinese: 林哲瑄; pinyin: Lín Zhéxuān; born September 21, 1988) is a Taiwanese former professional baseball outfielder who is currently a coach for the Fubon Guardians of the Chinese Professional Baseball League (CPBL). He has previously played in Major League Baseball (MLB) for the Boston Red Sox.

== Career ==
Lin was born in Hualien County, Taiwan. He helped his 12-and-under Bronco League team to the World Championship with a grand slam. He also has played with other Taiwan national teams, including the Junior World Championship squad in 2007.

=== Boston Red Sox ===
Lin was acquired by the Boston Red Sox as an international free agent in June 2007. He has put up solid numbers since joining the professional baseball ranks in the United States the same year, being rated as having the best outfield arm in the Boston minor league system, according to Baseball America. In 2010, Lin was selected as having the best strike-zone discipline, and the best defensive outfielder in Red Sox Top 10 Prospect Scouting Report. Basically a line-drive hitter, he makes good contact – quick, strong wrists – with average gap power, hitting well to all fields. Lin has also been recognized for his solid outfield skills, having good range, enough speed and a hard throwing arm.

Lin played for the GCL Red Sox, Lowell Spinners of the New York–Penn League, Greenville Drive of the South Atlantic League, and Portland Sea Dogs in the Eastern League. He played for the Triple A Pawtucket Red Sox in the International League.

In 2008, Lin was selected for the annual All-Star Futures Game. Lin hit a two-run home run on the first pitch he saw that helped the World team beat the US Team, 3–0. He finished 2-for-2 and was named the game's Most Valuable Player.

In 2008, Lin ranked eighth in the Boston Red Sox prospects list. He also was selected to play in the Olympics for the Chinese Taipei baseball team. He was invited to spring training with the Boston Red Sox in 2010 and 2011.

On May 21, 2011, Lin was promoted to Triple-A and played with the Pawtucket Red Sox. To protect him from the Rule 5 draft, he was added to the 40-man roster on November 18, 2011 along with Drake Britton and Will Middlebrooks.

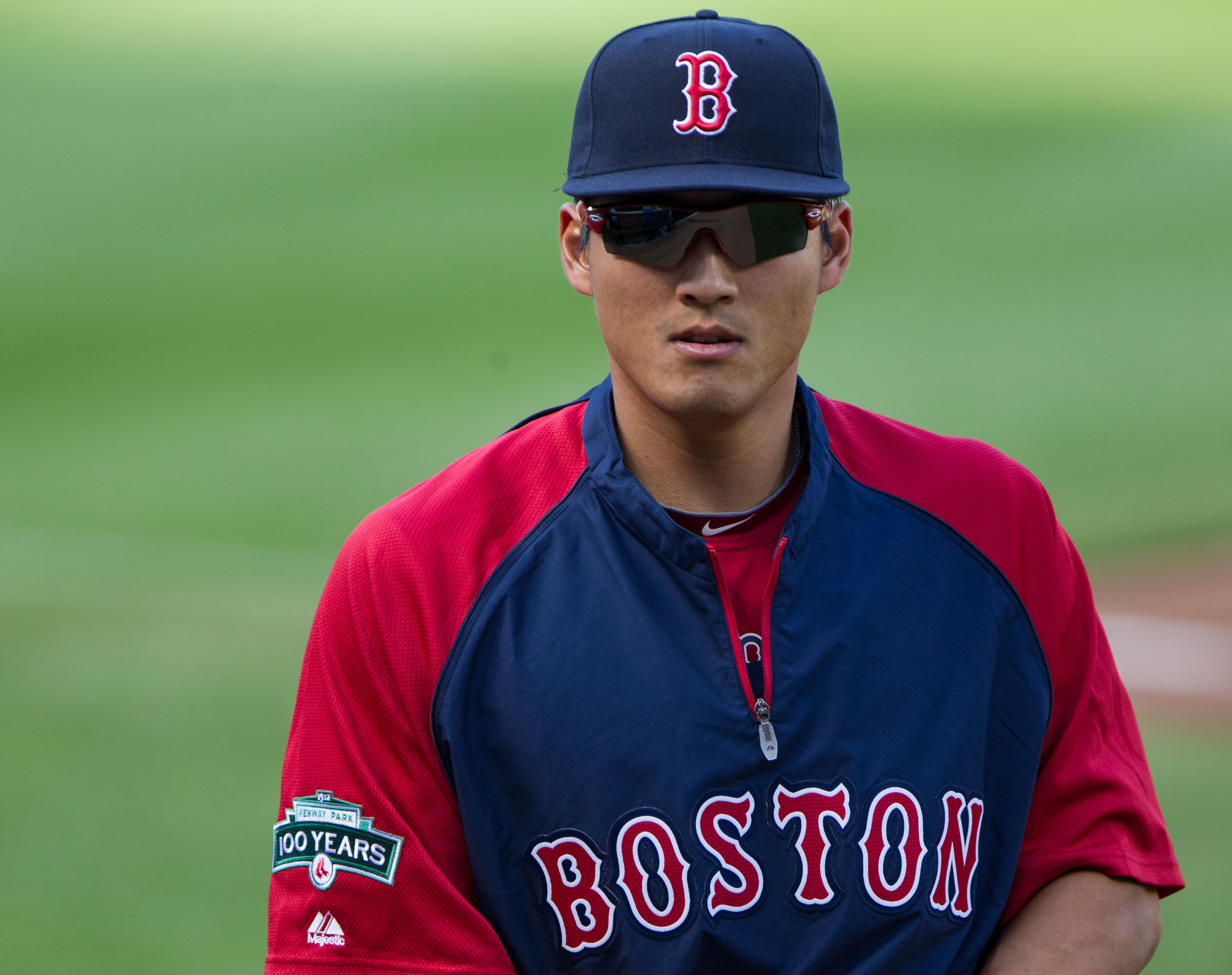
Lin during his tenure with the Boston Red Sox in 2012

On April 14, 2012, Lin was called up to replace the injured Jacoby Ellsbury. His 9th-inning appearance as a defensive replacement on April 14 made him the eighth player from Taiwan to play in a Major League Baseball game. He was optioned back to Pawtucket after the game. Lin rejoined the Red Sox on May 20 to provide depth in the outfield, with injuries to Cody Ross, Ryan Sweeney and five others on the disabled list. On May 21, Lin recorded his first major league hit off Baltimore Orioles pitcher Troy Patton.

On October 17, 2012, the Red Sox announced that Lin was designated for assignment to make room for right-handed pitcher Sandy Rosario on the Sox's 40-man roster.

=== Houston Astros ===
On October 26, 2012, Lin was claimed off waivers by the Houston Astros. On December 19, 2012, Lin was designated for assignment by the Astros and on December 21 he was assigned outright to the Oklahoma City RedHawks. On November 4, 2013, he elected free agency.

=== Texas Rangers ===
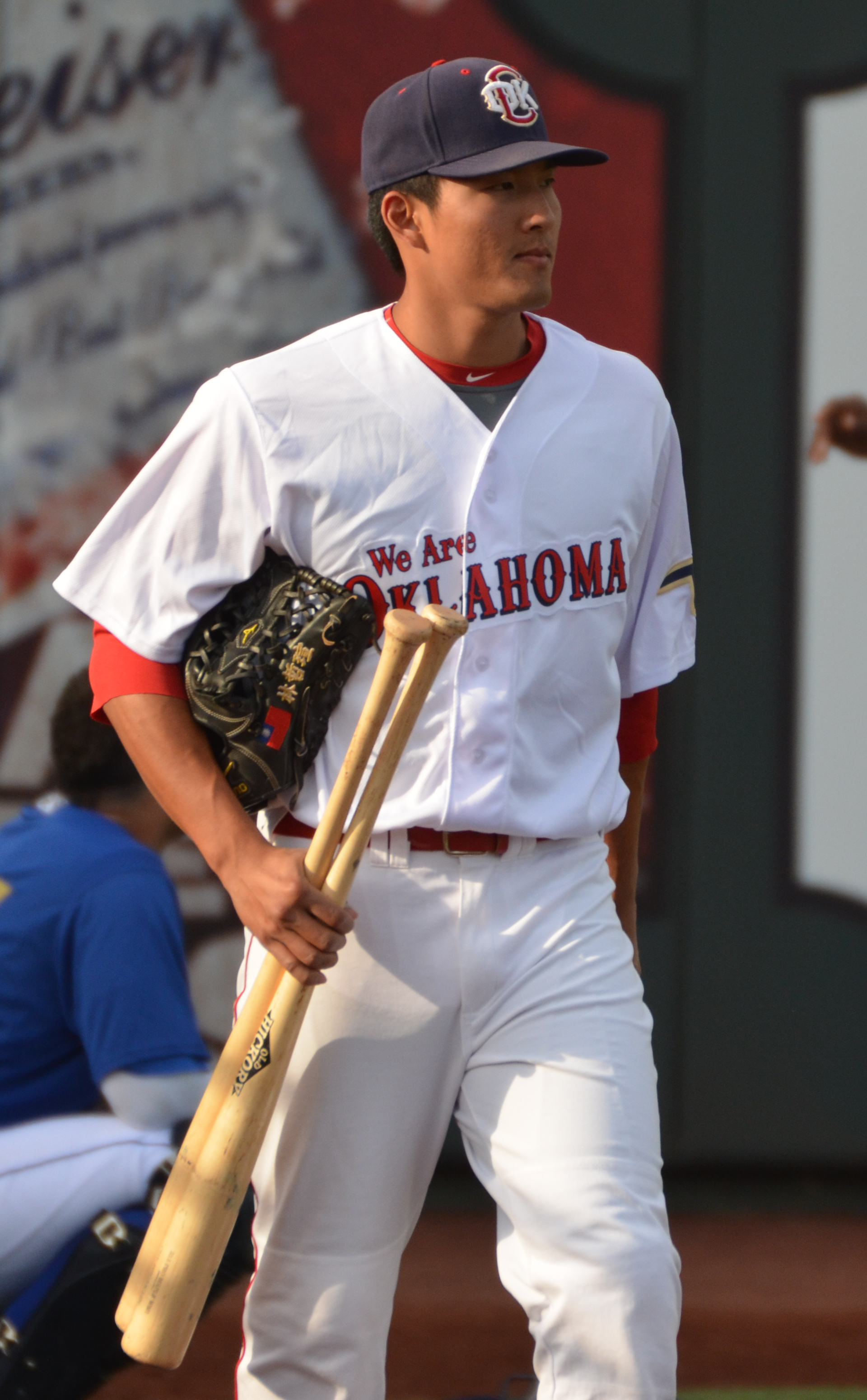
Lin with the Oklahoma City RedHawks in 2013

Lin signed a minor league deal with the Texas Rangers on December 15, 2013. The Rangers intended to use Lin as a pitcher. The Rangers released him on December 23, 2014.

After being released by the Rangers, Lin stated that he would no longer be playing baseball in North America.

=== EDA Rhinos/Fubon Guardians ===
Lin joined the EDA Rhinos, later rebranded as the Fubon Guardians, after he was drafted by the club at #1 overall in the 2015 Chinese Professional Baseball League draft. In his first campaign with EDA, Lin slashed .244/.359/.372 in 20 games. In 2016, Lin slashed .345/.434/.570 for the Rhinos in 107 games. Lin and the Rhinos won the Taiwan Series in 2016 and Lin was named the MVP of the series. In 2017, Lin was named team captain. In the first season with the team as the Fubon Guardians, Lin hit .296/.374/.405 with 3 home runs, 43 RBI, and 9 stolen bases in 91 games. In 2018, Lin played in 106 games for Fubon, hitting .278/.342/.425 with 10 home runs, 59 RBI, and 18 stolen bases.

In 2019 for Fubon, Lin hit .314/.363/.469 with 9 home runs and 48 RBI in 112 games. In the delayed 2020 CPBL season due to the COVID-19 pandemic, Lin hit .291/.392/.455 with 9 home runs and 32 RBI in 73 games for the Guardians. Lin was in the Guardians' starting lineup for Opening Day in 2021. On the season, he posted a slash of .238/.334/.331 with 5 home runs, 23 RBI, and 13 stolen bases in 84 total contests.

Lin made 38 appearances for Fubon in 2022, slashing .244/.321/.319 with one home run, 4 RBI, and 5 stolen bases. On July 26, 2022, Lin suffered a labral tear in his left shoulder while attempting a diving catch against the Wei Chuan Dragons. He was later ruled out for the remainder of the season. Lin's 2024 and 2025 seasons were also slowed by injuries. He played 55 games in 2024, and eight through September 12, 2025, the day that he announced his retirement, effective at season's end. Before the 2025 regular season began, Lin trained at the Driveline Baseball facility founded by Kyle Boddy. During rehabilitation for a back injury suffered in April of that year, Lin considered retirement, finalizing his decision by July.

== International career ==
He was selected Chinese Taipei national baseball team at the 2009 World Baseball Classic, 2013 World Baseball Classic and 2017 World Baseball Classic.

On October 15, 2018, he selected 2018 MLB Japan All-Star Series exhibition game against Japan, but he canceled his participation for Chinese Taipei.

== See also ==
- List of Major League Baseball players from Taiwan
