= A. J. Miller House =

Historic house in Virginia, United States

- U.S. National Register of Historic Places
- Virginia Landmarks Register
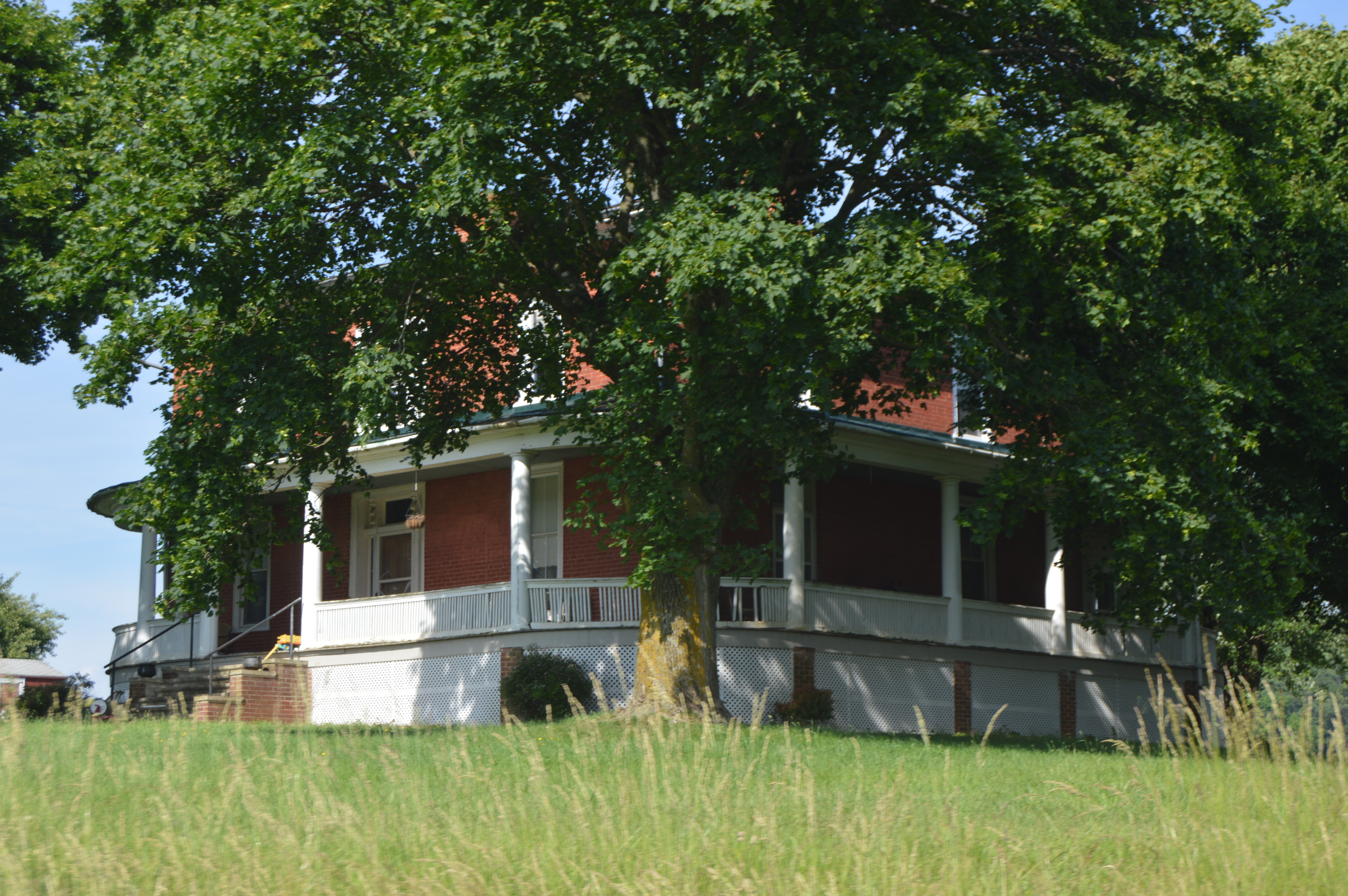
- Front and western side

- Location within Virginia Location within the United States
- Location: Sinking Spring Road, southwest of Middlebrook, Virginia
- Coordinates: 38°1′25″N 79°13′57″W
- Area: 9 acres (3.6 ha)
- Built: 1884
- Architectural style: Italianate
- NRHP reference No.: 82004542
- VLR No.: 007-0638

Significant dates
- Added to NRHP: July 8, 1982
- Designated VLR: June 16, 1981

A. J. Miller House, also known as the Miller-Hemp House, is a historic home located near Middlebrook, Augusta County, Virginia. It was built in 1884, and is a two-story, three-bay, brick dwelling in the Italianate style. It features a central Italianate entrance and tripartite second-floor window, and paired interior chimneys. The interior features a wide variety of painted decoration by itinerant artist Green Berry Jones, who signed and dated his work June 17, 1892. They include large, brightly painted landscapes; vignettes; and woodgraining and marbleizing. Also on the property are five contributing outbuildings: two barns and a granary, a carriage house and chicken house.

It was listed on the National Register of Historic Places in 1982.
