= Félix Doubront =

Venezuelan baseball player (born 1987)

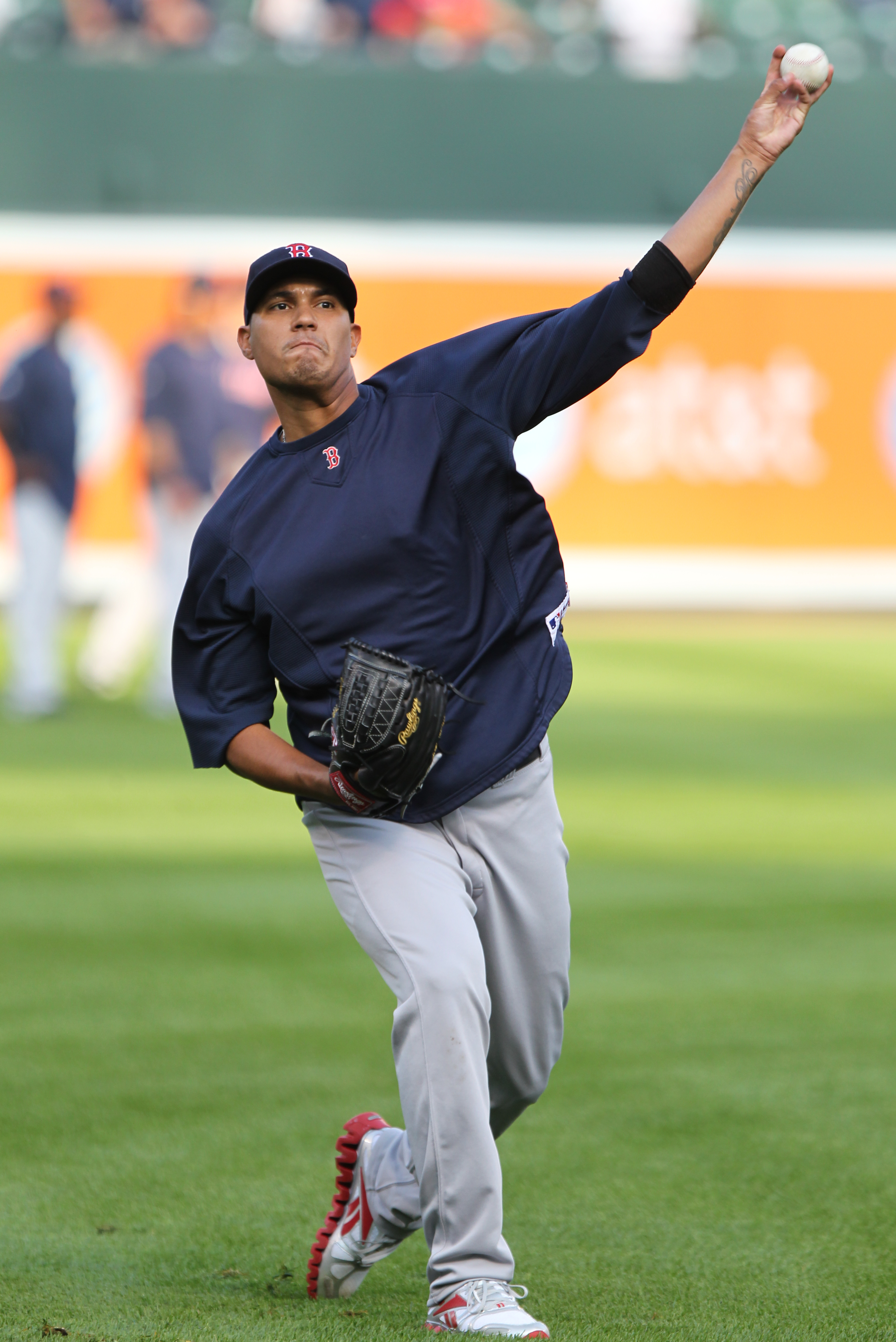
- Doubront with the Boston Red Sox in 2011

Free agent
- Pitcher
- Born: October 23, 1987 (age 39); Puerto Cabello, Venezuela
- Bats: Left Throws: Left

Professional debut
- MLB: June 18, 2010, for the Boston Red Sox
- KBO: March 24, 2018, for the Lotte Giants
- CPBL: May 16, 2021, for the Uni-President Lions

MLB statistics (through 2015 season)
- Win–loss record: 31–26
- Earned run average: 4.89
- Strikeouts: 442

KBO statistics (through 2018 season)
- Win–loss record: 6–9
- Earned run average: 4.92
- Strikeouts: 109

CPBL statistics (through 2021 season)
- Win–loss record: 7–3
- Earned run average: 3.42
- Strikeouts: 67
- Stats at Baseball Reference

Teams
- Boston Red Sox (2010–2014); Chicago Cubs (2014); Toronto Blue Jays (2015); Oakland Athletics (2015); Lotte Giants (2018); Uni-President Lions (2021)

Career highlights and awards
- World Series champion (2013)

Félix Antonio Doubront [doo-bront'] (born October 23, 1987) is a Venezuelan pitcher who is a free agent. He has previously played in Major League Baseball for the Boston Red Sox, Chicago Cubs, Toronto Blue Jays and Oakland Athletics in a span of six seasons from 2010 through 2015. He has also pitched in the KBO League for the Lotte Giants and in the Chinese Professional Baseball League (CPBL) for the Uni-President Lions.

== Professional career ==
=== Boston Red Sox ===
==== Minor leagues ====
Doubront was 17 years old when he entered the minors in 2005 with the VSL Red Sox (rookie), playing for them one year before joining the GCL Red Sox (rookie, 2006), Lowell Spinners (Low–A, 2006–2007), Greenville Drive (Single–A, 2007–2008) and Lancaster JetHawks (High–A, 2008). His most productive season came in 2008, when he posted a combined 13–9 record with a 3.76 ERA in 119 1/3 innings of work.

==== Major leagues ====
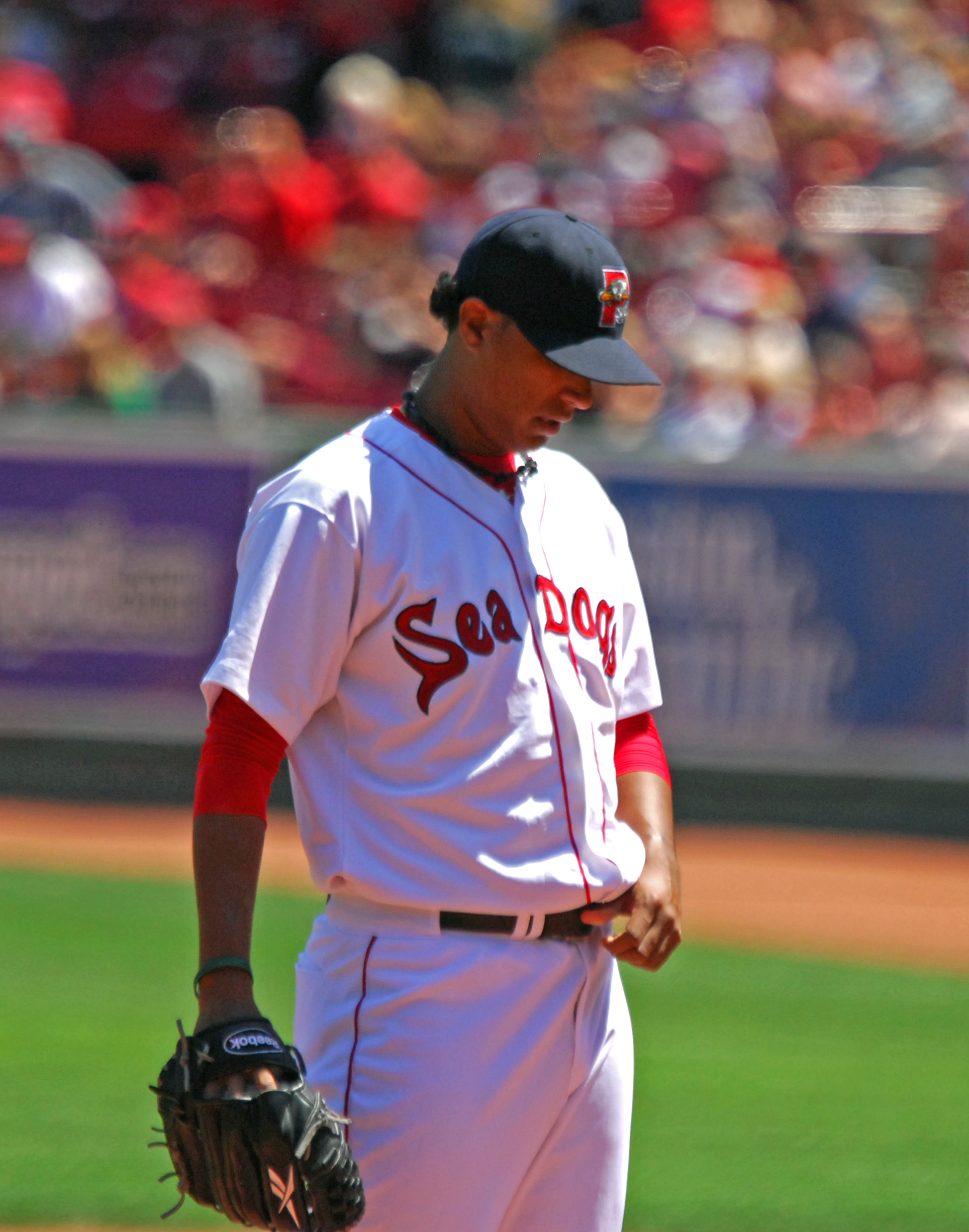
Doubront playing with the Portland Sea Dogs in 2009

Doubront made his Major League debut on June 18, 2010, against the Los Angeles Dodgers, pitching five innings, allowing three earned runs, two walks, and struck out two for the win. It was a spot start and Doubront was optioned back to Pawtucket after the game. He was recalled on July 5 after Clay Buchholz joined a long list of Red Sox players to go on the disabled list. Doubront made two more starts and lost both of them before being optioned on July 17. He was recalled August 6, and returned to the Red Sox roster as a reliever.

Doubront entered the 2012 season as one of the Red Sox starters, beating out Aaron Cook and Alfredo Aceves in spring training. Despite slow starts for Josh Beckett, Clay Buchholz and Jon Lester, and Daniel Bard's demotion to the minors, Doubront earned five wins against two losses in his first ten starts. In June, Doubront took a no-hitter into the sixth inning against the Miami Marlins. He finished the game giving up two runs on three hits and earned the win. He ended the season as a full-time starter, with a record of 11–10.

Doubront turned in another effective season in 2013, posting an 11–6 record over 27 starts for a Red Sox team that would win 97 games and a World Championship. Doubront pitched out of the bullpen in the postseason, earning his first career postseason victory in Game 4 of the 2013 World Series.

Doubront struggled to start the 2014 season. In May, he left a game after experiencing discomfort in his left shoulder, later attributed to hitting it on a car door. He would later lose his spot in the starting rotation due to his inconsistency. He criticized the decision, stating "First of all, I’m not a reliever... They [the Red Sox] know that. They just, you know, it’s hard but I don’t know what they’re doing. I know they’re not doing the right thing for me." After allowing 6 runs in 2/3 of an inning against the Toronto Blue Jays on July 28, Doubront had a meeting with manager John Farrell, and two days later he was traded. To begin the 2014 season, Doubront's record was 2–4 with a 6.07 ERA in 17 games (10 starts).

=== Chicago Cubs ===
On July 30, 2014, Doubront was traded to the Chicago Cubs for a player to be named later (Marco Hernández). He was placed on the disabled list on August 1 without having pitched for the Cubs. He was activated from the disabled list on August 30. In 4 more starts, Doubront posted a 3.98 ERA with a 2–1 record. Overall in 2014, combined with both teams, Doubront's record was 4–5 with a 5.54 ERA in 21 appearances (14 starts).

The Cubs released Doubront on March 28, 2015.

=== Toronto Blue Jays ===
On April 2, 2015, Doubront signed a minor league contract with the Blue Jays, and was assigned to the Triple-A Buffalo Bisons. On May 13, he was activated off the disabled list and made his Bisons debut, pitching five shutout innings and allowing only one hit and one walk. Doubront was called up by the Blue Jays in early July, and made his debut for the team pitching 2 1/3 relief innings against the Detroit Tigers on July 3. He made his first start for the Blue Jays on July 7, pitching 6 2/3 innings and getting the win against the Chicago White Sox, 2–1. Doubront was designated for assignment on July 29. In 5 games (4 starts), Doubront went 1–1 with a 4.76 ERA.

=== Oakland Athletics ===
On July 31, 2015, Doubront was traded to the Oakland Athletics for cash considerations. Finishing the season with the Athletics, Doubront made 11 appearances (8 starts) with a 2–2 record and a 5.81 ERA. Overall in 2015, his total record was 3–3 with a 5.50 ERA in 16 appearances (12 starts).

On April 11, 2016, it was revealed that Doubront would undergo Tommy John surgery and miss the entire 2016 season. Doubront was outrighted to the Triple-A Nashville Sounds on October 7, and he then elected free agency.

On November 15, 2016, Doubront re-signed with Oakland on a minor league contract. In 29 appearances for the Triple–A Nashville Sounds, he recorded a 3.86 ERA with 50 strikeouts in 42.0 innings of work. Doubront elected free agency following the season on November 6, 2017.

=== Lotte Giants ===
On December 14, 2017, Doubront signed a one-year, $1 million contract with the Lotte Giants of the KBO League. Doubront made just three starts and posted a 13.50 ERA in 9 1/3 innings. Afterwards, he was placed on waivers in September 2018.

=== Pericos de Puebla ===
On February 14, 2019, Doubront signed with the Pericos de Puebla of the Mexican League. He was released on May 3. In 5 starts 22.2 innings he struggled immensely going 1-3 with a 7.94 ERA with 13 strikeouts.

=== Saraperos de Saltillo ===
On May 14, 2019, Doubront signed with the Saraperos de Saltillo of the Mexican League. In 17 starts 103 innings he went 7-3 with a 3.84 ERA with 95 strikeouts and he threw 1 complete game.

=== Uni-President Lions ===
On January 5, 2021, Doubront signed with the Uni-President Lions of the Chinese Professional Baseball League. He posted a 7–3 record with a 3.42 ERA and 67 strikeouts over 84.1 innings. Doubront was not re-signed for the 2022 season and became a free agent.

=== Saraperos de Saltillo (second stint) ===
On February 15, 2022, Doubront re-signed with the Saraperos de Saltillo of the Mexican League. In 15 starts, he registered a 6–5 record with a 5.28 ERA and 71 strikeouts over 76.2 innings. Doubront was released on February 24, 2023.

=== Leones de Yucatán ===
On June 20, 2023, Doubront signed with the Leones de Yucatán of the Mexican League. In 8 games (7 starts), Doubront posted a 4–0 record and 2.23 ERA with 38 strikeouts across 36 1/3 innings of work.

=== Dorados de Chihuahua ===
On February 8, 2024, Doubront was traded to the Dorados de Chihuahua of the Mexican League. In 17 starts for Chihuahua, Doubront compiled a 3–10 record and 3.84 ERA with 76 strikeouts across 105 1/3 innings pitched.

=== Leones de Yucatán (second stint) ===
On July 22, 2024, Doubront was traded back to the Leones de Yucatán of the Mexican League in exchange for Yamil Castillo. In 2 starts for Yucatán, he logged an 0–1 record and 4.32 ERA with 9 strikeouts across 8 1/3 innings pitched.

=== Caliente de Durango ===
On September 19, 2024, Doubront and Neftalí Feliz were traded to the Caliente de Durango of the Mexican League. In 2025, he made 14 starts, posting a 4–5 record with a 4.86 ERA, 47 strikeouts, and 24 walks across 66 2/3 innings pitched.

In 2026, Doubront struggled in two appearances, allowing five earned runs across three innings pitched. On May 14, 2026, he was released by Durango.

== Scouting report ==
Doubront's main pitches are a four-seam and two-seam fastball that range between 90 and 95 mph. He also throws a cut fastball (87–89), a big curveball (76–80), and a changeup (85–88) that is used mostly against right-handed hitters. His deceptive delivery results in hitters not being able to pick up the ball until late. The late pick-up also makes his fastball look faster to opposing hitters.

== Awards ==
- 2005 - BRS Minor League Latin pitcher of the month (July)
- 2005 - BRS Minor League Latin pitcher of the year
- 2006 - BRS prospects All-Star (LH starting pitcher)
- 2008 - BRS prospects pitcher of the week (July 28 - August 3)
- 2008 - BRS prospects pitcher of the week (August 18–24)
- 2008 - BRS prospects All-Star (starting pitcher)
- 2008 - South Atlantic League All-Star
- 2009 - Portland Sea Dogs Pitcher of the Year
- 2013 - World Series champion

== See also ==
- List of Major League Baseball players from Venezuela
