= Middlebrook (surname) =

Middlebrook is a surname. Notable people with the surname include:

- Diane Middlebrook (1939–2007), American biographer, poet and teacher
- James Middlebrook (born 1977), English cricketer
- Jason Middlebrook (baseball) (born 1975), American baseball pitcher
- Lindsay Middlebrook (born 1955), Canadian ice hockey goaltender
- Martin Middlebrook (1932–2024), British military historian and author
- R. D. Middlebrook (1929–2010), early pioneer of power electronics
- William Middlebrook, 1st Baronet (1851–1936), English solicitor and Liberal Party politician
- Willie Middlebrook (1858–1919), English cricketer
- Willie Middlebrook (artist) (1957–2012), African-American photographer, artist and advocate

== See also ==
- Middlebrooks, surname
- Middlebrook (disambiguation)
