= Middle Brook =

Middle Brook may refer to:

- Middle Brook, Missouri, an unincorporated community
- Middle Brook (Raritan River tributary), in Somerset County, New Jersey
- Middle Brook (New York), a river in Delaware and Schoharie Counties

== See also ==
- Middlebrook (disambiguation)
