= Maple Front Farm =

- U.S. National Register of Historic Places
- Virginia Landmarks Register
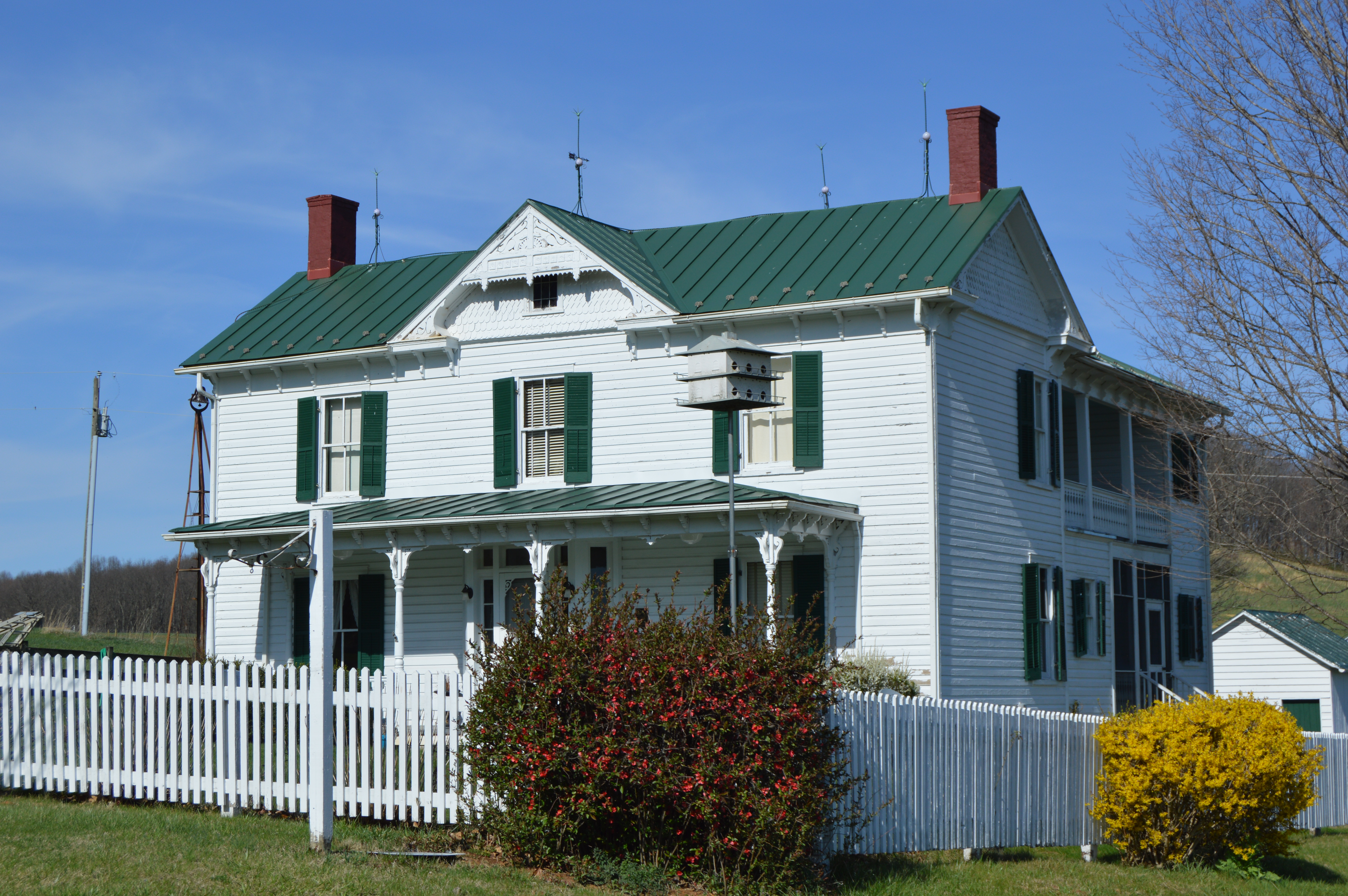
- Front and southern side

- Location within Virginia Location within the United States
- Location: 439 Cales Springs Rd., near Middlebrook, Virginia
- Coordinates: 38°03′33″N 79°14′26″W
- Area: 7 acres (2.8 ha)
- Built: c. 1900
- NRHP reference No.: 10000562
- VLR No.: 007-5050

Significant dates
- Added to NRHP: August 16, 2010
- Designated VLR: June 17, 2010

Maple Front Farm, also known as Locust Front Farm and W. K. Clemmer Farm, is a historic home and farm complex located near Middlebrook, Augusta County, Virginia. The house was built about 1900, and is a two-story, three-bay, frame I-house. Also on the property are a contributing washhouse, meat house, wood house, acetylene gas-generating structure, farm bell tower, garage, and granary.

It was listed on the National Register of Historic Places in 2010.
