= Middlebrook, Virginia =

Middlebrook
- CDP
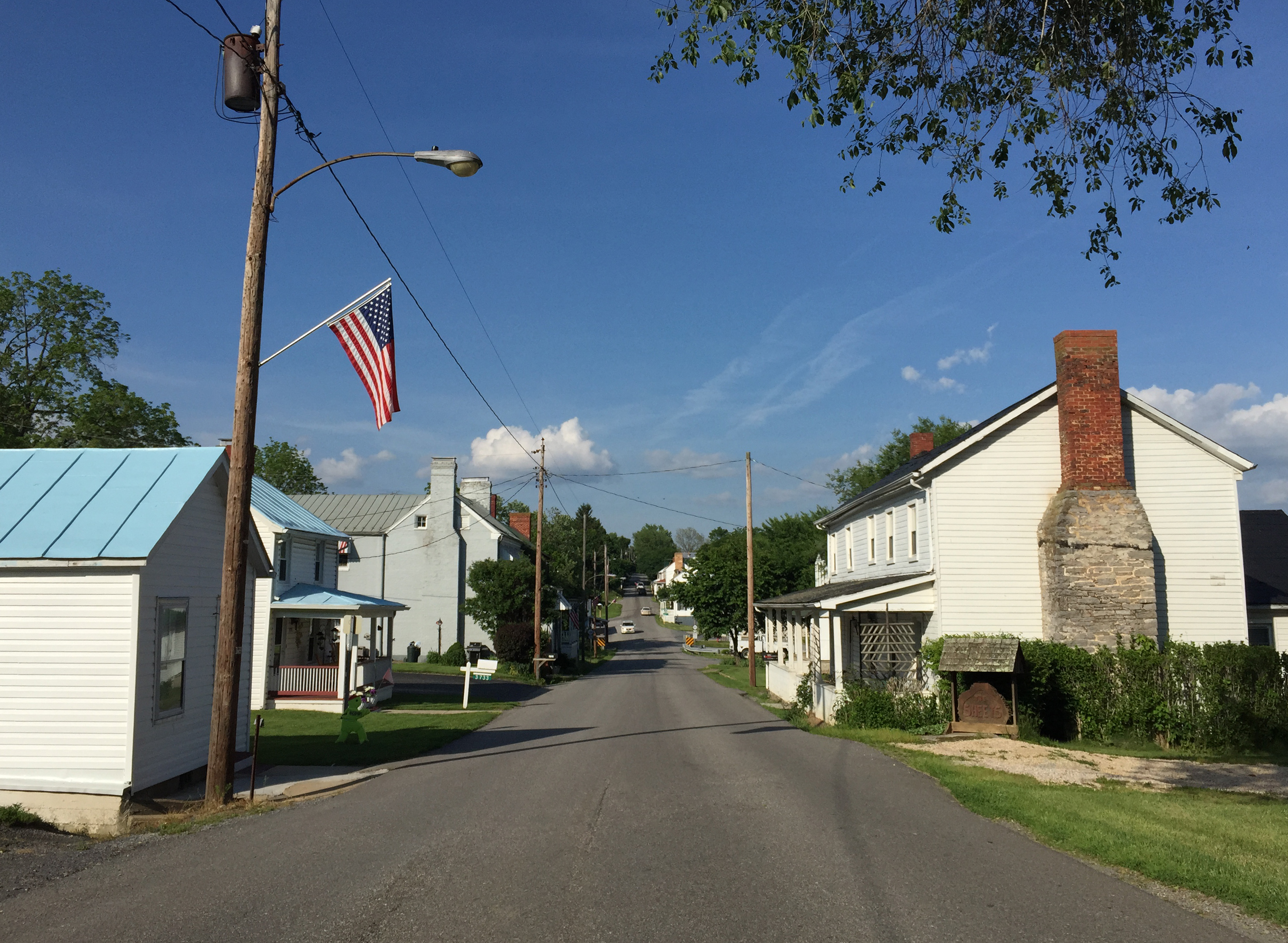

- Location within the Commonwealth of Virginia
- Coordinates: 38°4′1″N 79°14′3″W
- Country: United States
- State: Virginia
- County: Augusta

Population (2010)
  - Total: 213
- Time zone: UTC−5 (Eastern (EST))
  - Summer (DST): UTC−4 (EDT)
- ZIP codes: 24459
- FIPS code: 51-51432
- GNIS feature ID: 2584881

Middlebrook is a census-designated place in Augusta County, Virginia, United States. The population as of the 2020 Census was 184.

== History ==
The village of Middlebrook, founded in 1799 by Scots-Irish and German settlers, stretches along Middlebrook Road, which by 1851 was a stagecoach road and a main transport route to Staunton. By the end of the 19th century it was a thriving agricultural community, growing to significance within Augusta County. Railroad building in the region in the late 19th and early 20th century caused Middlebrook to fade in economic importance and cease growing. As a result, the buildings in Middlebrook today reflect an earlier era, a window of what a village looked like in late 19th century.

Middlebrook Historic District, Middlebrook Schools, A. J. Miller House, Henry Mish Barn and Maple Front Farm are listed on the National Register of Historic Places.

== Demographics ==
Historical population
| Census | Pop. | Note | %± |
|---|---|---|---|
| 2010 | 213 | | — |
| 2020 | 184 | | −13.6% |
U.S. Decennial Census; 2010 2020

Middlebrook was first listed as a census designated place in the 2010 U.S. census.
