= Middlebrook (Knoxville, Tennessee) =

Historic house in Tennessee, United States

- U.S. National Register of Historic Places
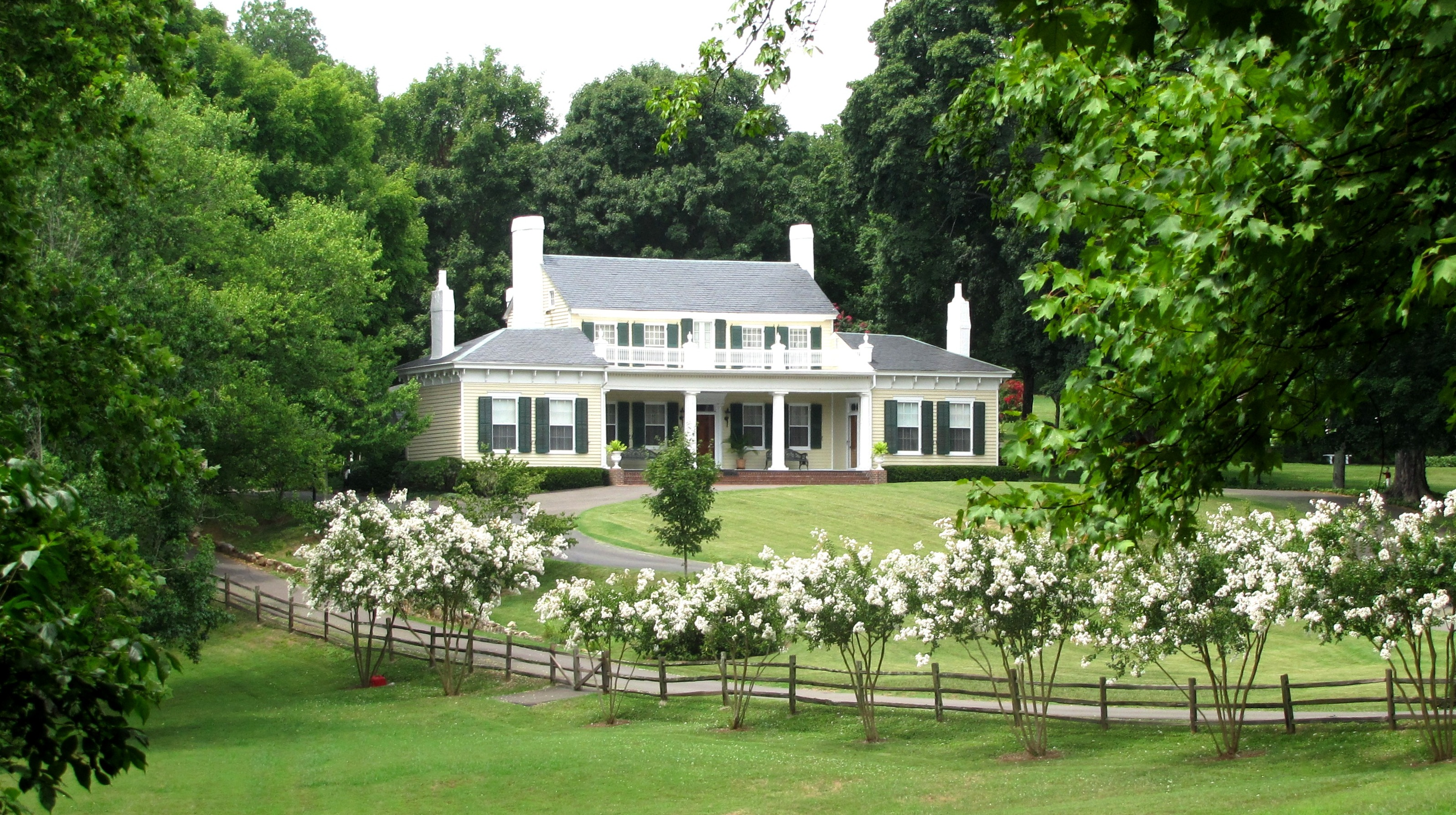
- Location: 4001 Middlebrook Pike; Knoxville, Tennessee
- Coordinates: 35°57′50″N 83°58′39″W
- Built: 1845
- Architect: Gideon Morgan Hazen
- NRHP reference No.: 74001920
- Added to NRHP: June 18, 1974

Middlebrook is a historic house located at 4001 Middlebrook Pike in Knoxville, Tennessee. It was constructed circa 1845 by Gideon Morgan Hazen, and is one of the oldest existing frame residences in Knoxville.

The house is a typical large estate home. The property also includes a small Gothic Revival spring house. The house was listed on the National Register of Historic Places in 1974.
