= Chris Carpenter (baseball, born 1985) =

American baseball player (born 1985)

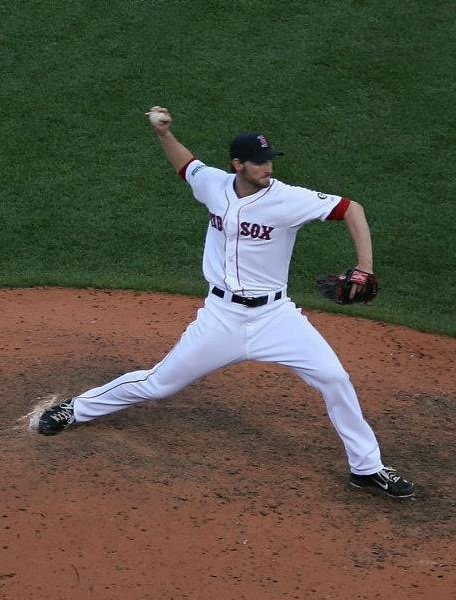
- Carpenter with the Boston Red Sox
- Pitcher
- Born: December 26, 1985 (age 40); Bryan, Ohio, U.S.
- Batted: Right Threw: Right

Professional debut
- MLB: June 14, 2011, for the Chicago Cubs
- NPB: March 29, 2014, for the Tokyo Yakult Swallows

Last appearance
- MLB: October 3, 2012, for the Boston Red Sox
- NPB: July 26, 2014, for the Tokyo Yakult Swallows

MLB statistics
- Win–loss record: 1–0
- Earned run average: 5.17
- Strikeouts: 10

NPB statistics
- Win–loss record: 1–2
- Earned run average: 4.73
- Strikeouts: 27
- Stats at Baseball Reference

Teams
- Chicago Cubs (2011); Boston Red Sox (2012); Tokyo Yakult Swallows (2014)

Christopher John Carpenter (born December 26, 1985) is an American former professional baseball pitcher. He played in Major League Baseball (MLB) for the Chicago Cubs and Boston Red Sox from 2011 to 2012, and in Nippon Professional Baseball (NPB) for the Tokyo Yakult Swallows in 2014.

== Amateur career ==
A native of Bryan, Ohio, Carpenter attended Bryan High School and Kent State University. In 2007, he played collegiate summer baseball with the Chatham A's of the Cape Cod Baseball League. In 2008, he was named the Mid-American Conference Baseball Pitcher of the Year.

== Professional career ==
=== Chicago Cubs ===
Carpenter was drafted by the Chicago Cubs in the third round, with the 97th overall selection, of the 2008 Major League Baseball draft.

Carpenter was called up to the majors for the first time with the Cubs on June 14, 2011. He made his debut that day against the Milwaukee Brewers, pitching two-thirds of an inning with one strikeout.

=== Boston Red Sox ===
Carpenter was dealt to the Boston Red Sox on February 21, 2012, as compensation for the Cubs hiring then-Boston General Manager Theo Epstein. He made eight appearances for Boston, but struggled to a 9.00 ERA with two strikeouts over six innings of work.

Carpenter was designated for assignment on January 22, 2013, to clear roster space for the newly signed Mike Napoli. He made 34 appearances split between the Low-A Lowell Spinners and Triple-A Pawtucket Red Sox, accumulating an 0–2 record and 4.62 ERA with 54 strikeouts across 50 2/3 innings pitched.

=== Tokyo Yakult Swallows ===
On December 17, 2013, the Red Sox sold Carpenter's contract to the Tokyo Yakult Swallows of Nippon Professional Baseball. Carpenter made 32 relief appearances for the Swallows in 2014, compiling a 1–2 record and 4.73 ERA with 27 strikeouts and three saves across 32 1/3 innings pitched.

=== Cincinnati Reds ===
On March 3, 2015, Carpenter signed a minor league contract with the Cincinnati Reds. After struggling to a 16.20 ERA with nine strikeouts in six appearances for the Triple-A Louisville Bats, Carpenter was released by the Reds organization on April 28.

== Personal ==
In 2013, Carpenter proposed to girlfriend, Sarah French on the Love Lock Bridge in Paris, France. The two met while Carpenter was pitching for the Boston Red Sox and French was covering the Red Sox Centennial as a reporter.

Following his playing career, Carpenter became a financial broker. On May 22, 2023, Carpenter was barred by the Financial Industry Regulatory Authority for refusing to supply information that was requested as part of an investigation.
