= Middlebrook Historic District =

Historic district in Virginia, United States

- U.S. National Register of Historic Places
- U.S. Historic district
- Virginia Landmarks Register
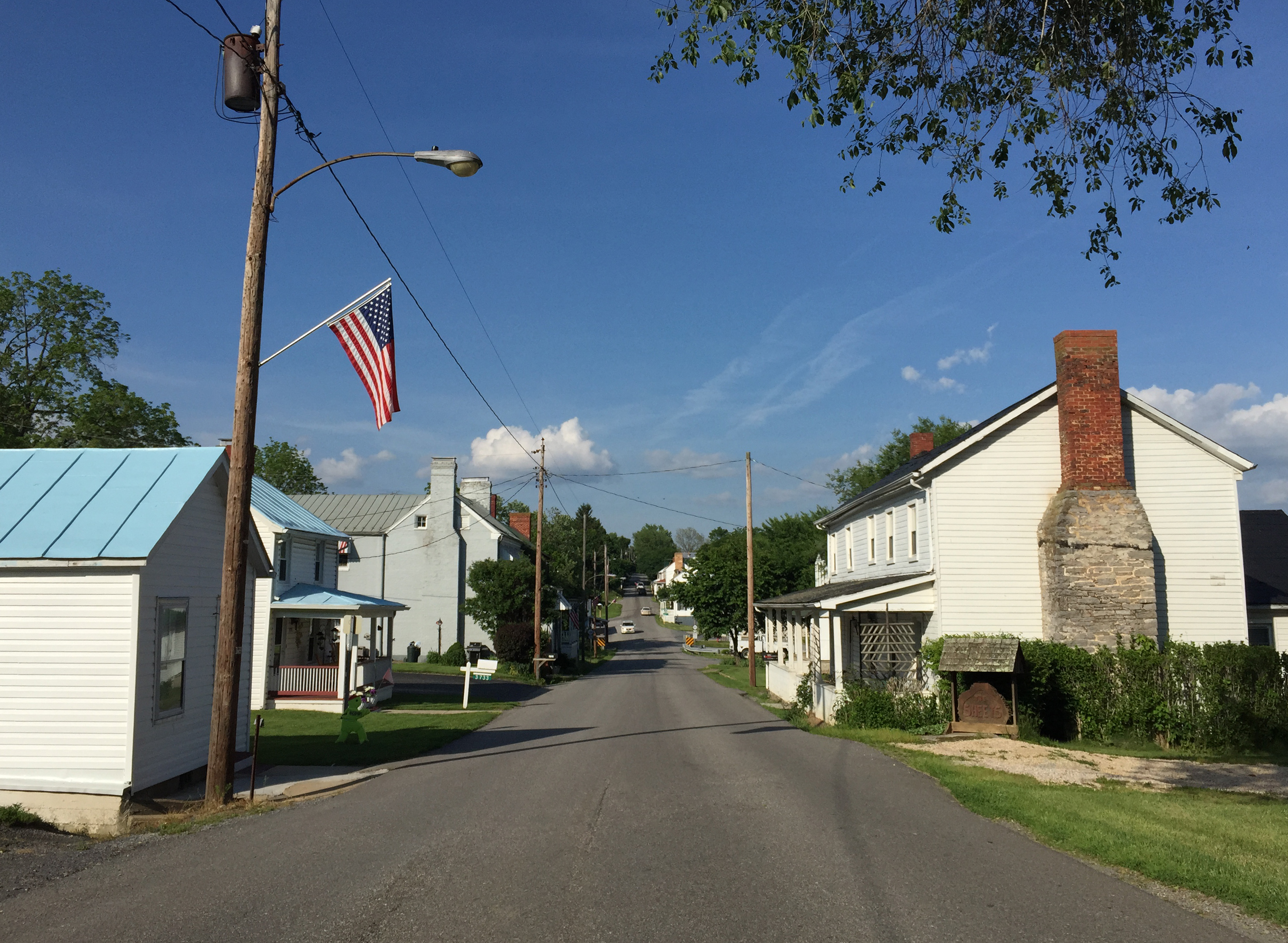
- State Route 252

- Location within Virginia Location within the United States
- Location: Junction of State Route 252 and Cherry Grove Road, Middlebrook, Virginia
- Coordinates: 38°03′07″N 79°12′53″W
- Area: 62 acres (25 ha)
- NRHP reference No.: 83003259
- VLR No.: 007-0236

Significant dates
- Added to NRHP: February 10, 1983
- Designated VLR: July 21, 1981

Middlebrook Historic District is a national historic district located at Middlebrook, Augusta County, Virginia, United States. It encompasses 50 contributing buildings and 52 contributing sites in the rural village of Middlebrook. Most of the buildings along the main street date to the 19th century. It primarily consists of vernacular houses and commercial buildings. Non-residential buildings include five stores, a frame school building, two churches, an Odd Fellows Hall, and a shoemaker's (now beauty) shop.

It was listed on the National Register of Historic Places in 1983.
