= Will Middlebrooks =

American baseball player (born 1988)

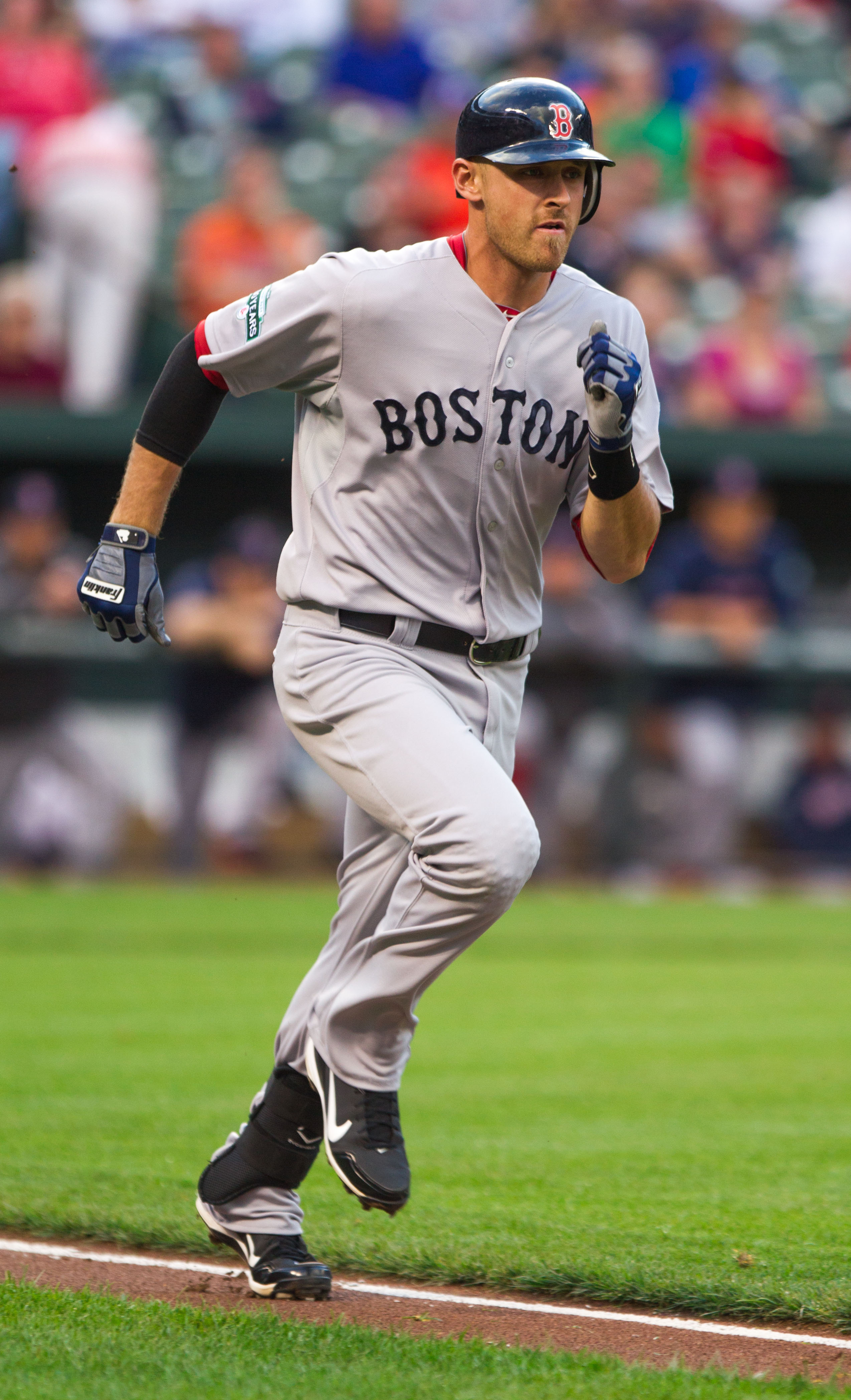
- Middlebrooks with the Boston Red Sox in 2012
- Third baseman
- Born: September 9, 1988 (age 38); Greenville, Texas, U.S.
- Batted: Right Threw: Right

MLB debut
- May 2, 2012, for the Boston Red Sox

Last MLB appearance
- October 1, 2017, for the Texas Rangers

MLB statistics
- Batting average: .228
- Home runs: 43
- Runs batted in: 155
- Stats at Baseball Reference

Teams
- Boston Red Sox (2012–2014); San Diego Padres (2015); Milwaukee Brewers (2016); Texas Rangers (2017)

Career highlights and awards
- World Series champion (2013)

William Scott Middlebrooks (born September 9, 1988) is an American retired professional baseball third baseman and is currently the main color analyst for the Boston Red Sox Radio Network on WEEI-FM. He also does color analysis for the Red Sox on NESN. He made his Major League Baseball (MLB) debut with the Red Sox on May 2, 2012, and played with them through 2014. He also played in MLB for the San Diego Padres, Milwaukee Brewers and Texas Rangers. He also worked as an analyst for a 2024 AL Wild Card series on ESPN Radio. A fifth round draft pick in the 2007 MLB draft out of Liberty-Eylau High School in Texarkana, Texas, Middlebrooks signed with the Red Sox for $925,000, bypassing his commitment to Texas A&M University. Middlebrooks was originally a shortstop, but the Red Sox converted him into a third baseman in the minor leagues. He represented the United States in the 2011 All-Star Futures Game. Following Middlebrooks' emergence as the Red Sox's starting third baseman in 2012, the organization traded former All-Star Kevin Youkilis. After struggles in the 2013 and 2014 seasons, the Red Sox traded Middlebrooks to the San Diego Padres before the 2015 season. He signed minor league contracts with the Brewers and Rangers before the 2016 and 2017 seasons, respectively.

== Amateur career ==
Middlebrooks attended Liberty-Eylau High School in Texarkana, Texas. He played shortstop and pitched for the high school baseball team. As a pitcher, he could reach 90 miles per hour (140 km/h) with his fastball. Liberty-Eylau won the Class 3A state championship in 2006, Middlebrooks' junior season. In his senior season, Middlebrooks had a .555 batting average with 22 stolen bases and 48 runs batted in (RBIs) in 38 games, and a 13-0 win–loss record as a pitcher. He was named to the Class 3A All-State First Team and Class 3A Player of the Year by the Texas Sports Writers Association.

In addition to baseball, Middlebrooks played American football and basketball in high school. A quarterback, placekicker and punter, he played on the school's football team, which also featured LaMichael James. He was named an All-State punter. Middlebrooks admits that he preferred football, until he realized during his junior year that he had the opportunity to be selected in the Major League Baseball draft. In November 2006, he committed to attend Texas A&M University on a full scholarship to play baseball and football for the Texas A&M Aggies.

== Professional career ==
Middlebrooks was an athletic defensive player and hit for power and was also credited for his contact skills, although he was not considered the most patient hitter. His throwing arm was well regarded, and his baserunning was rated as average.

=== Boston Red Sox ===
==== Minor leagues ====
Middlebrooks had been projected as a first round talent in the 2007 Major League Baseball draft. However, the belief that he would follow through with his scholarship to Texas A&M led Middlebrooks to fall in the draft. The Boston Red Sox drafted Middlebrooks in the fifth round of the draft, selecting him as a shortstop, rather than as a pitcher. He received a $925,000 signing bonus to renege on his commitment to Texas A&M.

Middlebrooks made his professional debut in 2008 with the Lowell Spinners of the Class A-Short Season New York–Penn League, where he batted .254 with one home run. He described himself as developmentally behind other players at his level because of the time he had devoted to football. Initially a shortstop, Middlebrooks made the transition to third base as he added muscle, increasing from 190 pounds (86 kg) at the time he was drafted to 210 pounds (95 kg).

In 2009, Middlebrooks played for the Greenville Drive of the Class A South Atlantic League, where he batted .265 with seven home runs and 57 RBIs. He was promoted to the Salem Red Sox of the Class A-Advanced Carolina League in 2010 and responded by batting .276 with 12 home runs and 70 RBIs. Middlebrooks began the 2011 season playing for the Portland Sea Dogs of the Class AA Eastern League. He played in the Eastern League All-Star Game, hitting a double in the game. Middlebrooks also participated in the 2011 All-Star Futures Game, starting at third base and going 1-for-2.

Through August 2011, Middlebrooks batted .306 with 18 home runs and 80 RBIs for Portland, at which point he was promoted to the Pawtucket Red Sox of the Class AAA International League. Joe McDonald of ESPN.com called Middlebrooks "Boston's likely [third baseman] of the future" upon his promotion from Portland to Pawtucket. He hit .161 in 16 games with Pawtucket to close out the 2011 season.

After the 2011 season, the Red Sox assigned Middlebrooks to the Arizona Fall League, where he hit four home runs in 13 games and was named to the Rising Stars Game. In November 2011, Middlebrooks, Che-Hsuan Lin, and Drake Britton were added to the Red Sox 40-man roster to protect them from being selected in the Rule 5 draft.

Heading into the 2012 season, Baseball America rated Middlebrooks as the Red Sox' best prospect and 51st best prospect overall. Starting the 2012 season with Pawtucket, Middlebrooks hit .333 with nine home runs and 27 RBIs in 24 games and 93 at-bats. Meanwhile, Red Sox starting third baseman Kevin Youkilis struggled, opening the 2012 season batting .219. As Youkilis struggled, Middlebrooks appeared to be ready for a promotion.

==== 2012 season ====
The Red Sox promoted Middlebrooks to the major leagues on May 2, 2012, when Youkilis was placed on the disabled list. He made his MLB debut that day, drawing a walk in his first plate appearance and recording two hits. On May 6, he hit a game-tying grand slam for his first major league home run in what was eventually a 17-inning loss to the Baltimore Orioles. In his first 41 games with the Red Sox, Middlebrooks batted .326 with nine home runs and 34 RBIs, the most RBIs to start a career for a member of the Red Sox since Walt Dropo recorded 37 RBIs in his first 41 career games dating back to 1949–50.

Bobby Valentine, the manager of the Red Sox, initially alternated between Middlebrooks and Youkilis at third base. However, Middlebrooks' emergence led the Red Sox to trade Youkilis on June 24. Middlebrooks was named American League Player of the Week for the week ending June 24. Middlebrooks broke a bone in his right hand when he was hit by a pitch in a game against the Cleveland Indians on August 10, ending his rookie season with a .288 batting average, 15 home runs and 54 RBIs in 75 games played.

==== 2013 season ====
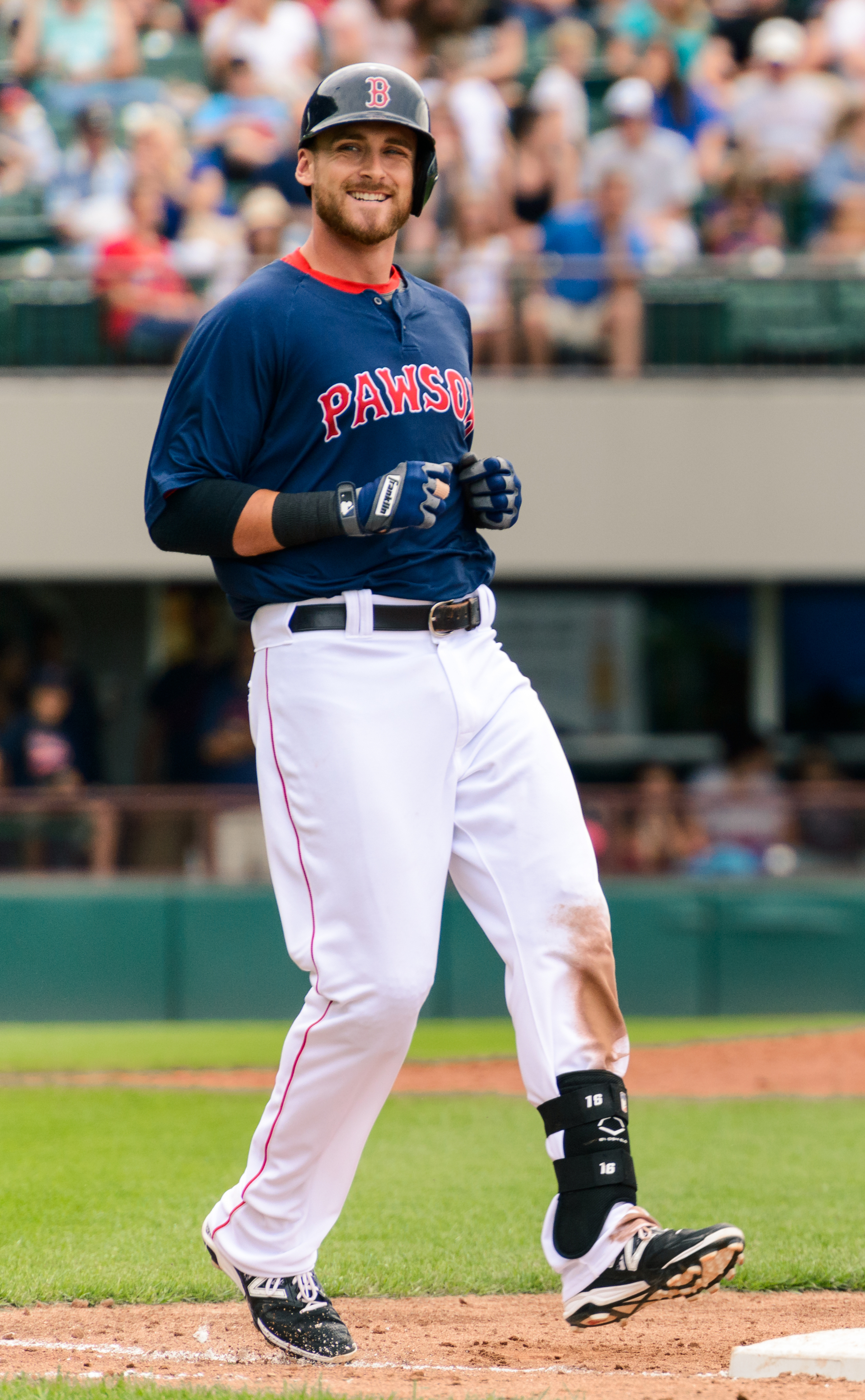
Middlebrooks with the Pawtucket Red Sox in 2014

On April 7, 2013, Middlebrooks hit three home runs in a 13–0 Red Sox victory over the Toronto Blue Jays in Toronto. Two of his home runs were hit off pitcher R. A. Dickey. However, he lost playing time to José Iglesias after he strained his back in May. After he batted .192 on the season, the Red Sox optioned Middlebrooks to Pawtucket on June 25, 2013. The Red Sox opted not to promote Middlebrooks when they traded Iglesias on July 30, using Brandon Snyder and Brock Holt instead. After Middlebrooks made adjustments, the Red Sox recalled him from Pawtucket on August 10. In Game 3 of the 2013 World Series, Middlebrooks was ruled to have obstructed future teammate Allen Craig after diving for an errant throw at third base. The play awarded Craig the game winning run for the Cardinals. The Red Sox won the series over the Cardinals.

==== 2014 season ====
In 2014, Middlebrooks missed 19 games in April due to a strained calf. In May, he broke a finger, and again went on the disabled list. He had been struggling at the plate to begin the season hitting just .197 with two home runs in 21 games. As he rehabilitated his injury in the minor leagues, Middlebrooks began playing in the outfield, due to the Red Sox' signing of Stephen Drew. After the Red Sox traded Drew, they hoped that Middlebrooks would improve his performance with more regular playing time. Middlebrooks continued to miss time later in the season due to lingering effects of the hand injury. He finished the 2014 season with a .191 average in 215 at-bats.

=== San Diego Padres ===
During the 2014–15 offseason, the Red Sox signed free agent Pablo Sandoval, a third baseman. On December 19, 2014, the Red Sox traded Middlebrooks to the San Diego Padres for Ryan Hanigan, whom the Padres had acquired earlier the same day. Middlebrooks competed with Yangervis Solarte to be the Padres' starting third baseman in spring training. With Middlebrooks batting .212 on the season, the Padres optioned Middlebrooks to the El Paso Chihuahuas of the Class AAA Pacific Coast League (PCL) on July 22. On December 2, 2015, the Padres non-tendered Middlebrooks, making him a free agent.

=== Milwaukee Brewers ===
On December 15, 2015, Middlebrooks agreed to a minor league contract with an invitation to spring training with the Milwaukee Brewers. The Brewers assigned him to the Colorado Springs Sky Sox of the PCL to start the 2016 season. Middlebrooks batted .282 with 10 home runs and 47 RBIs for Colorado Springs, before he was promoted to the major leagues on July 4. After batting .111 in ten games for Milwaukee, he went on the disabled list with a strained leg. The Brewers activated him from the disabled list and outrighted him off the 40-man roster on August 30.

=== Texas Rangers ===
Middlebrooks signed a minor league contract with the Texas Rangers on November 11, 2016. He began the 2017 season with the Round Rock Express of the PCL. He spent most of 2017 with the Express until he was called up by the Rangers in September. He became the first player in over 100 years to hit a pinch-hit triple in both games of a doubleheader on September 6, 2017, against the Atlanta Braves. In 22 games for Texas, Middlebrooks batted .211/.231/.368 with no home runs and three RBI. On October 10, Middlebrooks was removed from the 40–man roster and sent outright to Round Rock. He subsequently rejected the assignment and elected free agency.

=== Philadelphia Phillies ===
On January 3, 2018, Middlebrooks signed a minor league contract with the Philadelphia Phillies that included an invitation to spring training. On February 25, Middlebrooks broke his leg in a spring training game against the Orioles, and because of this injury, he did not appear in a game during the 2018 season. He elected free agency following the season on November 2, and on January 10, 2019, he announced his retirement.

== Broadcasting career ==
In 2019, Middlebrooks was hired as a baseball analyst for CBS Sports HQ. In March 2022, Middlebrooks joined NESN, where his wife Jenny worked from 2012 to 2013, as a studio analyst for Red Sox coverage.

== Personal life ==
Middlebrooks grew up in Texarkana, Texas. His father, Tom, served as the head baseball coach and assistant football coach at Liberty-Eylau, and his younger sister, Lacey, played softball for the University of Tulsa. She was the head coach of both Liberty-Eylau and Texas High. Middlebrooks' mother, Julie, and youngest sister, Mary, are artists; Julie is an art teacher. He became friends with Ryan Mallett when they met in a football camp after Mallett moved to the Texarkana area in the seventh grade.

Middlebrooks was engaged to Ann Lux, a former Dallas Cowboys cheerleader; however, they broke up in August 2012. They are from the same hometown and have known each other since age 12. Later in 2012, Middlebrooks began dating Jenny Dell, a field reporter who covered the Red Sox for the New England Sports Network. They became engaged in July 2014, and were married in February 2016. Middlebrooks and Dell had their first child, a daughter, in October 2018. A second daughter arrived in December 2019. Dell struggled to get pregnant and used fertility treatments.
