= 2012 Chicago White Sox season =

Major League Baseball season

2012 Chicago White Sox
- League: American League
- Division: Central
- Ballpark: U.S. Cellular Field
- City: Chicago, Illinois
- Record: 85–77 (.525)
- Divisional place: 2nd
- Owners: Jerry Reinsdorf
- General managers: Kenny Williams
- Managers: Robin Ventura
- Television: CSN Chicago; CSN+ WGN-TV and WGN America; WCIU-TV (Ken Harrelson, Steve Stone)
- Radio: WSCR (Ed Farmer, Darrin Jackson); WNUA HD-2 (Spanish) (Hector Molina, Billy Russo)

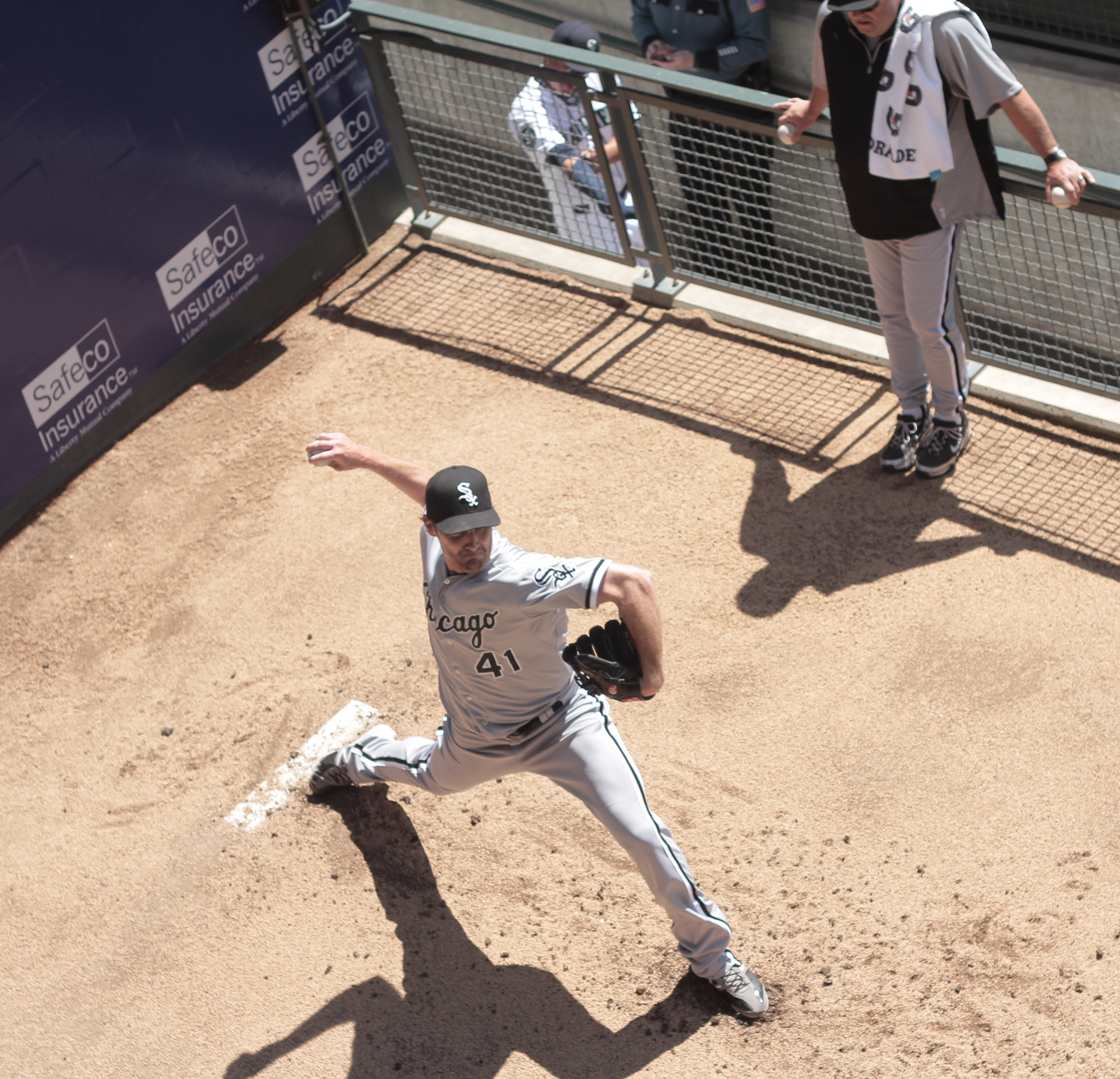
Phil Humber warming up in the visiting team's bullpen at Safeco Field (now T-Mobile Park in Seattle) prior to a perfect pitching game on April 21, 2012.

The 2012 Chicago White Sox season was the club's 113th season in Chicago and 112th in the American League. On October 6, 2011, Robin Ventura was designated to be the new manager. This would be the White Sox's last winning season until 2020.

== Offseason ==
White Sox GM Kenny Williams called the 2012 season a "rebuilding" year. In doing so, the Sox made some big moves in the offseason by trading away or letting big name free agents leave. Mark Buehrle became a free agent and decided to follow his former manager, Ozzie Guillén, and sign with the Miami Marlins. The White Sox closer during the 2011 season, Sergio Santos, was traded to the Toronto Blue Jays. Left fielder Juan Pierre became a free agent and signed with the Philadelphia Phillies. Power hitting right fielder Carlos Quentin, was traded to the San Diego Padres. The White Sox did however sign or acquire young talent, including players like José Quintana, Néstor Molina, Simón Castro, Pedro Hernández, Jhan Mariñez, Héctor Giménez, Damaso Espino, Erik Morrison and Osvaldo Martínez. The White Sox signed former Cub and Indian, Kosuke Fukudome, to be the team's fourth outfielder.

=== Offseason additions and subtractions ===
	Subtractions	Additions
Players	LHP Mark Buehrle (signed with Marlins); RHP Sergio Santos (traded to Blue Jays); RHP Jason Frasor (traded to Blue Jays); RHP Josh Kinney (signed with Mariners); C Ramón Castro (free agent); C Donny Lucy (retired); INF Omar Vizquel (signed with Blue Jays); OF Juan Pierre (signed with Phillies); OF Carlos Quentin (traded to Padres); OF Lastings Milledge (signed with NPB Tokyo Yakult Swallows)	LHP Donnie Veal* (Minor League free agent); LHP José Quintana* (Minor League free agent); LHP Eric Stults** (Minor League free agent); RHP Néstor Molina* (traded from Blue Jays); RHP Simón Castro* (traded from Padres); LHP Pedro Hernández* (traded from Padres); RHP Myles Jaye* (traded from Blue Jays); RHP Daniel Webb* (traded from Blue Jays); LHP Scott Olsen* (Minor League free agent); RHP Jhan Mariñez* (compensation from Marlins); C Héctor Giménez** (Minor League free agent); C Damaso Espino** (Minor League free agent); 1B Dan Johnson** (Minor League free agent); 2B Erik Morrison* (Minor League free agent); SS Osvaldo Martínez (compensation from Marlins); INF Ray Olmedo** (Minor League free agent); INF Corey Smith* (Minor League free agent); OF Delwyn Young** (Minor League free agent); OF Kosuke Fukudome (free agent)
Personnel	Manager Ozzie Guillén† (released); Bench coach Joey Cora† (released); Hitting coach Greg Walker (released); Third base coach Jeff Cox (released)	Manager Robin Ventura; Bench coach Mark Parent; Hitting coach Jeff Manto; Third base coach Joe McEwing

†Player released during 2011 season
*Player spent entire 2011 season in Minor Leagues
**Player was non-roster invitee to Spring training (not on 40-man roster)

=== 2012 top prospects ===
#	Player	Position	Top 100 rank	MLB rank	2012 Starting team (level)
1	Addison Reed	Right-handed pitcher	66	92	Majors
2	Néstor Molina	Right-handed pitcher	-	-	AA
3	Simón Castro	Right-handed pitcher	-	-	AA
4	Trayce Thompson	Outfielder	-	-	High A
5	Jacob Petricka	Right-handed pitcher	-	-	High A
6	Keenyn Walker	Outfielder	-	-	Low A
7	Jhan Mariñez	Right-handed pitcher	-	-	AAA
8	Tyler Saladino	Shortstop	-	-	AA
9	Juan Silverio	Third baseman	-	-	High A
10	Osvaldo Martínez	Shortstop	-	-	AAA

* According to Baseball America Top 100 Prospects

* According to 2012 Prospect Watch

* Top 10 White Sox prospects via Baseball America

== Transactions ==
- 03/25/12 – OF Greg Golson traded from the Kansas City Royals to the White Sox for cash.
- 04/03/12 – Traded OF Christian Marrero to the Atlanta Braves for cash.
- 04/06/12 – Signed RHP Kip Wells to a minor league deal. but subsequently agreed to a mutual release on April 16, 2012
- 04/10/12 – Acquired INF Jose Castro from the Cincinnati Reds for cash.
- 05/17/12 – Eric Stults claimed off waivers by the San Diego Padres.
- 05/19/12 – Signed free agent 2B Orlando Hudson.
- 06/24/12 – Acquired 3B Kevin Youkilis from the Boston Red Sox for UT Brent Lillibridge and RHP Zach Stewart.
- 06/26/12 – Released OF Kosuke Fukudome.
- 07/03/12 – Released LHP Will Ohman.
- 07/21/12 – Acquired RHP Brett Myers from the Houston Astros and cash for minor league prospects RHP Matthew Heidenreich and LHP Blair Walters.
- 07/28/12 – Acquired LHP Francisco Liriano from the Minnesota Twins for Eduardo Escobar and Pedro Hernández.
- 08/03/12 – Signed free agent DeWayne Wise to a minor league contract.

== Regular season ==
=== Season standings ===
==== American League Central ====
AL Central
Team	W	L	Pct.	GB	Home	Road
Detroit Tigers	88	74	.543	—	50‍–‍31	38‍–‍43
Chicago White Sox	85	77	.525	3	45‍–‍36	40‍–‍41
Kansas City Royals	72	90	.444	16	37‍–‍44	35‍–‍46
Cleveland Indians	68	94	.420	20	37‍–‍44	31‍–‍50
Minnesota Twins	66	96	.407	22	31‍–‍50	35‍–‍46

==== American League Wild Card ====
Division winners
Team	W	L	Pct.
New York Yankees	95	67	.586
Oakland Athletics	94	68	.580
Detroit Tigers	88	74	.543

Wild Card teams (Top 2 teams qualify for postseason)
Team	W	L	Pct.	GB
Texas Rangers	93	69	.574	—
Baltimore Orioles	93	69	.574	—
Tampa Bay Rays	90	72	.556	3
Los Angeles Angels	89	73	.549	4
Chicago White Sox	85	77	.525	8
Seattle Mariners	75	87	.463	18
Toronto Blue Jays	73	89	.451	20
Kansas City Royals	72	90	.444	21
Boston Red Sox	69	93	.426	24
Cleveland Indians	68	94	.420	25
Minnesota Twins	66	96	.407	27

=== Record vs. opponents ===
2012 American League record Source: MLB Standings Grid – 2012
Team	BAL	BOS	CWS	CLE	DET	KC	LAA	MIN	NYY	OAK	SEA	TB	TEX	TOR	NL
Baltimore	–	13–5	6–2	4–4	3–3	5–4	2–7	5–2	9–9	4–5	8–1	10–8	2–5	11–7	11–7
Boston	5–13	–	6–2	5–3	5–5	4–3	0–6	4–3	5–13	1–8	5–4	9–9	2–6	7–11	11–7
Chicago	2–6	2–6	–	11–7	6–12	6–12	3–5	14–4	5–2	3–3	8–1	4–3	6–3	6–4	9–9
Cleveland	4–4	3–5	7–11	–	10–8	8–10	5–4	6–12	1–5	2–8	4–4	4–4	4–5	2–4	8–10
Detroit	3–3	5–5	12–6	8–10	–	13–5	5–5	10–8	4–6	4–3	1–5	5–2	3–7	4–2	11–7
Kansas City	4–5	3–4	12–6	10–8	5–13	–	4–5	7–11	3–4	5–4	1–7	4–2	4–5	2–6	8–10
Los Angeles	7–2	6–0	5–3	4–5	5–5	5–4	–	6–3	4–5	9–10	11–8	1–9	10–9	4–4	12–6
Minnesota	2–5	3–4	4–14	12–6	8–10	11–7	3–6	–	3–4	4–5	2–8	1–5	2–8	2–5	9–9
New York	9–9	13–5	2–5	5–1	6–4	4–3	5–4	4–3	–	5–5	6–3	8–10	4–3	11–7	13–5
Oakland	5–4	8–1	3–3	8–2	3–4	4–5	10–9	5–4	5–5	–	12–7	5–4	11–8	5–4	10–8
Seattle	1–8	4–5	1–8	4–4	5–1	7–1	8–11	8–2	3–6	7–12	–	4–6	9–10	6–3	8–10
Tampa Bay	8–10	9–9	3–4	4–4	2–5	2–4	9–1	5–1	10–8	4–5	6–4	–	5–4	14–4	9–9
Texas	5–2	6–2	3–6	5–4	7–3	5–4	9–10	8–2	3–4	8–11	10–9	4–5	–	6–3	14–4
Toronto	7–11	11–7	4–6	4–2	2–4	6–2	4–4	5–2	7–11	4–5	3–6	4–14	3–6	–	9–9

- Source: MLB Standings Grid – 2012

==== Detailed records and runs scored/allowed ====
Opponent	Home	Away	Total	Pct.	Runs scored	Runs allowed
AL East
Baltimore Orioles	1–3	1–3	2–6	.250	31	35
Boston Red Sox	1–3	1–3	2–6	.250	20	45
New York Yankees	3–0	2–2	5–2	.714	38	28
Tampa Bay Rays	1–3	3–0	4–3	.571	24	26
Toronto Blue Jays	3–3	3–1	6–4	.600	45	41
	9–12	10–9	19–21	.475	158	175
AL Central
Cleveland Indians	5–4	6–3	11–7	.611	120	73
Detroit Tigers	5–4	1–8	6–12	.333	69	84
Kansas City Royals	3–6	3–6	6–12	.333	52	78
Minnesota Twins	7–2	7–2	14–4	.778	113	77
	20–16	17–19	37–35	.514	364	310
AL West
Los Angeles Angels	2–1	1–4	3–5	.375	30	36
Oakland Athletics	2–1	1–2	3–3	.500	26	22
Seattle Mariners	5–1	3–0	8–1	.889	55	38
Texas Rangers	3–0	3–3	6–3	.667	46	27
	12–3	8–9	20–12	.625	157	123
Interleague
Chicago Cubs	1–2	3–0	4–2	.667	27	20
Houston Astros	1–2	0–0	1–2	.333	22	20
Los Angeles Dodgers	0–0	1–2	1–2	.333	12	13
Milwaukee Brewers	2–1	0–0	2–1	.667	9	7
St. Louis Cardinals	0–0	1–2	1–2	.333	9	7
	4–5	5–4	9–9	.500	79	67

=== Season summary ===
==== Composite inning summary ====
	1	2	3	4	5	6	7	8	9	10	11	12	13	14
Runs scored	105	64	73	76	100	126	69	83	60	7	0	1	0	3
Runs allowed	80	75	100	50	77	96	60	69	66	11	1	4	0	3

==== Opening Day lineup ====
Alejandro De Aza	CF
Brent Morel	3B
Adam Dunn	DH
Paul Konerko	1B
A. J. Pierzynski	C
Alex Ríos	RF
Alexei Ramírez	SS
Dayán Viciedo	LF
Gordon Beckham	2B
John Danks	P

=== Monthly summaries ===
==== April ====
The White Sox started the season with their new manager Robin Ventura. In Ventura's first game managed on April 5, the Sox lost 3–2 at Texas. Ventura didn't have to wait long for his first MLB victory as the next day the Sox won 4-3 thanks to a 9th-inning home run by Alex Ríos. Then the Sox lost their first series of the season by dropping the finale to the Rangers 5–0. They went to Cleveland for a two-game series, but three games was scheduled to play, but one game was postponed due to rain. The Sox swept the Indians there. On April 13, the Sox played their first home game of the season against the Tigers and won that game 5-2 and went on to take two out of three to win their first home series of the season. The Sox hosted the Orioles when they dropped three of four to finish their first homestand with a 3–4 record. Then they embark on their west coast trip for six games, three for each city. The Sox swept the Mariners and lost two of three to the Athletics. On April 21 during the second game of the series in Seattle, Philip Humber threw the 21st perfect game in MLB history with 96 pitches thrown with 9 strikeouts in the 4–0 win. In the final game of the series in Oakland on April 25, Paul Konerko hit milestone home run number 400. The Sox travelled back home to host the Red Sox and dropped their first three of a four-game set. The Sox avoided the sweep by beating the Red Sox 4–1 behind a great performance by Gavin Floyd. Konerko had a great first month of the season as he batted .383 with 5 home runs and 15 RBI while winning Player of the Week from April 23 through April 29. The White Sox lost five of their last six games to close out April but finished the month with a record of 11-11 and outscored their opponents 85–82.

==== May ====
The White Sox started the month of May losing two of three against the Indians, losing two of three to the Tigers and then lost a doubleheader in Cleveland on May 7. The Sox then came back and won the next two games against Cleveland to split the four games series. The White Sox came home from May 11–15, they lost two of three to the Royals and split a two-games series with the Tigers. Then the White Sox travelled to Los Angeles for a two games series against the Angels. The Sox lost the first game of the series and at that point, through May 16, the White Sox had an overall record of 17-21 and were four and a half games back from the first place Indians. The Sox then beat the Angels in the second game and split the two-game series. The Sox then came back to Chicago for a road series against the Cubs at Wrigley Field for the Crosstown Classic. In the first game of the series, Paul Konerko hit a home run in his first at bat off of Jeff Samardzija. The next time Konerko came up, Samardzija hit Konerko in the face with a pitch and knocked him out for the rest of the series. Samardzija stated that it was not intentional and a breaking ball just got away from him. A few innings later, Sox pitcher Philip Humber threw a pitch behind the Cubs first baseman Bryan LaHair. Both teams were warned and no other problems came about during the series. The Sox went on the sweep the Cubs winning 2–1, 7-4 and 6–0. It was the third time the White Sox had sweep the Cubs and the second time they did it at Wrigley Field. The Sox then lost the first game of a three games series against the Twins. The Sox took the next two games against the Twins to win the series. The Sox then swept the Indians at home by the scores of 9–3, 14-7 and 12–6. The Sox then traveled to Tampa Bay to face the Rays for three games. On May 28, in the first game of that series, the Sox won 2–1 as Chris Sale struck out 15 Rays which tied him with Eddie Cicotte, Ed Walsh and Jim Scott for second most strikeouts in a single game in franchise history. Jack Harshman holds the team record with 16 strikeouts in a single game. The Sox swept the Rays and finished the month on an 8-game winning streak and won 12 of their last 13 games to finish the month of May. The White Sox went from four and a half games back on May 17 to first place and a game and a half over the Indians by the end of the month. The Sox finished the month with a good record of 18-11 and outscored their opponents 156–122.

==== June ====
The Sox started the month winning two of three against the Mariners and then losing two of three against the Blue Jays. The White Sox then went into their interleague play part of the season. The Sox started interleague play by facing the Astros. The Astros won the first and third game to win the series. The Sox then traveled to St. Louis to face the defending World Series Champion Cardinals where the Sox won the first game of the series and then lost the next two. The White Sox then traveled to Los Angeles to take on the Dodgers. At the time the Sox played Los Angeles, the Dodgers had the best record in baseball at 40–24. The Sox managed only one win during the three-game series and the Sox went back home after a 2-4 road trip. The Sox then faced their Crosstown rivals for the second time this season. The White Sox lost the first two games to the Cubs but avoided a sweep by winning the final game of the series, 7–0. The Sox then fell out of first place for the first time since May 28. The Sox wrapped up interleague play by winning two of three against the Brewers to finish the interleague season at 9-9. On June 24, during the final game against the Brewers, the White Sox acquired Kevin Youkilis and cash from the Red Sox for Brent Lillibridge and Zach Stewart. The White Sox then finished the month on the road winning two of three against the Twins and winning two of three against the Yankees. A rare occurrence happened during the second game against the Yankees. Going into the top of the ninth inning, the White Sox led the Yankees 10–7. The Yankees had Cory Wade on the mound for the third inning in a row. He had already given up two runs in the seventh and then gave up four more in the 9th while only recording one out. Yankees manager, Joe Girardi, decided to let outfielder DeWayne Wise pitch because the teams bullpen had been so over used the past few days. Wise had not pitched since his sophomore year of high school. Wise is well known by White Sox fans by making "The Catch" that preserved Mark Buehrle's perfect game in 2009. Wise then went on to retire Paul Konerko on a fly ball to center field and got Alex Ríos to ground out to finish out the 9th. The Sox finished the month of June with a record of 13–14, but outscored their opponents 124–116.

==== July ====
The White Sox started the month losing the final game of a four-game series against the Yankees. The Sox then swept the two-time defending American League Champion Rangers and took two of three against the Blue Jays. In the opener of the series against the Rangers, the Sox scored a season high 19 runs. The Sox then went into the All-Star break with a three-game lead over the Indians. They were well represented at the All-Star Game with four players making the squad (Adam Dunn, Paul Konerko, Jake Peavy and Chris Sale). The Sox then came out of the break taking two of three against the Royals. The Sox then hit a rough patch which saw them lose 6 of their next 7 games. They lost three of four against the Red Sox and then were swept in Detroit by the Tigers. On July 21, the Sox acquired RHP Brett Myers from the Houston Astros and cash for minor league prospects RHP Matthew Heidenreich and LHP Blair Walters. Also on the same date, the Sox fell out of first place for the first time since June 23. After sweeping the Twins at home, the Sox took the division lead back from the Tigers. On July 28, the Sox acquired LHP Francisco Liriano from the Minnesota Twins for Eduardo Escobar and Pedro Hernández. The Sox took two of three in Texas and then finished the month splitting two games in Minnesota. On July 31, the Sox stated that John Danks would have season ending surgery on his shoulder. The White Sox finished the month with a record of 14-11 (8–1 at home) and outscored their opponents 124–108.

==== August ====
On August 3, the Sox brought back DeWayne Wise, who was released from the Yankees on July 30. The Sox started August by beating the Twins 3–2 to secure their series win in Minnesota. Then the Sox had a nine-game homestand as they hosted the Angels, Royals, and the eventual AL West Champion A's. The Sox took two out of three from the Angels, two games went into extras where each club won one. The Sox lost two of three from the Royals and bounced back to win two of three from Athletics. The Sox lost the first game of the series in Toronto via walk-off in extras, and then the Sox went on to win last three in a row to finish the series winning three of four. That was the first series win in Toronto since 2006. The Sox went to KC where they were swept in a three-game set, but not without a historical moment. During the second game of the series on August 18, Adam Dunn hit his 400th career home run. With Konerko also hitting his milestone number 400 back in April, they became the first pair of teammates to hit 400th home runs in the same season in MLB history. The Sox came back home to face the eventual AL East Champion Yankees for three games and the eventual last place finish in AL West Mariners for three games. The Sox swept the mighty Yankees and Mariners to secure their perfect 6-0 homestand. In the opener of the series against the Mariners, the Sox were up five runs going to the ninth inning only to give up six runs to blow that comfortable lead. Then in the home half of the ninth inning, the Sox scored two runs to take the lead back and win it on a walk-off single by Paul Konerko that center fielder Michael Saunders missed the flyball against the wall. The Sox traveled to their tough seven-game road trip to Baltimore and Detroit that stretches into September. Not surprisingly, the Sox lost three out of four in Baltimore and lost the first game in Detroit to close out the month with a respectable record of 16-12 and outscored their opponents 128–118.

==== September/October ====
The Sox opened September by losing final two games of the series in Detroit. They were swept in Detroit for the second consecutive time. The Sox hosted the ten-game homestand that was actually reduced to nine because of a rainout. The Sox took two of three from Minnesota but in the only loss of that series, Sox pitching allowed a season high 18 runs. Also in that game, DeWayne Wise pitched for the second time in his career as he pitched a scoreless ninth, he induced a double play and a flyout. The Sox proceeded to host three games to Kansas City when they dropped two of three including one in the extras. The Sox won the opener of the series against Detroit 6–1 thanks to the performance by José Quintana. The Sox went on to lose two in a row against Detroit. The Sox supposed to play one more game to complete the four-game set but it was rained out and made up on a day that was supposed to be an off day for both clubs. It was scheduled for Chris Sale to battle Justin Verlander if not for a rainout but instead it was Quintana versus Doug Fister for a makeup game. Before the make up game after the rainout, the Sox swept the Twins in Minnesota. In the fifth inning of that makeup game, Sox trailed 4–3, Dayán Viciedo grounded into what would otherwise have been a routine double play to end the inning, but Detroit second baseman Omar Infante threw away past first baseman Prince Fielder and two runs scored. The Sox went on to win the makeup game 5–4 after neither clubs scored runs after that play. They went right back on the road trip after just one game at home. They traveled down to Kansas City where they won the first game and lost the last two and went west to L.A. where they were swept by Angels. They went back home to play for seven games, three against the Indians and four against the Rays. They won the opener of the series against the Tribe and then lost the last two to close out that series. After the loss of that finale game, the Sox were not in first place for the first time since July 23. The Sox went on to lose three of four to the red-hot Rays. The playoff hopes for Sox had been diminishing fast as they lost 10 out of their last 12 games, dropping their elimination number to just one as they enter the 10th month of the year. It is now a must situation when the Sox must sweep the Indians and Tigers must get swept in Kansas City, both clubs were playing the final three games of the season. In the opener of the series in Cleveland, the Sox won 11–0, but Tigers also won 6–3, thus eliminating Sox from going to the playoffs. Anyway, the Sox dropped the second game of the series 4–3 on a walk-off single by Jason Donald in the 12th inning. The Sox won the final game of the season by beating the Indians 9–0. The Sox finished September/October with a 13–18 record, but they still outscored their opponents 130–128. They finished 2012 campaign at 85–77, three games back of the Detroit Tigers. The Sox spent 126 days in first place.

== Game log ==
Legend
	White Sox win
	White Sox loss
	Postponement
**Bold**	White Sox team member

2012 White Sox game log
April (11–11) – Home (4–7) – Road (7–4) – 85 R.S. 82 R.A.

#	Date	Opponent	Score	Win	Loss	Save	Attendance	Time	Record	GB	Box
1	April 6	@ Rangers	2–3	Lewis (1–0)	**Danks** (0–1)	Nathan (1)	49,085	2:24	0–1	−1	box
2	April 7	@ Rangers	4–3	**Thornton** (1–0)	Nathan (0–1)	**Santiago** (1)	47,867	2:36	1–1	−1	box
3	April 8	@ Rangers	0–5	Matt Harrison (1–0)	**Floyd** (0–1)		45,368	2:50	1–2	−2	box
4	April 9	@ Indians	4–2	**Sale** (1–0)	Tomlin (0–1)	**Santiago** (2)	9,473	2:42	2–2	−1½	box
−	April 10	@ Indians	Postponed (rain); rescheduled May 7 (game 1)							−2	
5	April 11	@ Indians	10–6	**Danks** (1–1)	Masterson (0–1)		9,072	3:04	3–2	−1	box
6	April 13	Tigers	5–2	**Peavy** (1–0)	Scherzer (0–1)	**Santiago** (3)	38,676	2:55	4–2	−½	box
7	April 14	Tigers	5–1	**Floyd** (1–1)	Wilk (0–1)		33,025	2:44	5–2	+½	box
8	April 15	Tigers	2–5	Porcello (1–0)	**Sale** (1–1)		25,143	3:06	5–3	−½	box
9	April 16	Orioles	4–10 (10)	Strop (1–1)	**Stewart** (0–1)		13,732	3:32	5–4	−1½	box
10	April 17	Orioles	2–3	Chen (1–0)	**Danks** (1–2)	Johnson (5)	11,267	2:44	5–5	−2½	box
11	April 18	Orioles	8–1	**Peavy** (2–0)	Hunter (1–1)		13,818	2:37	6–5	−2½	box
12	April 19	Orioles	3–5	Hammel (2–0)	**Floyd** (1–2)	Johnson (6)	11,836	3:08	6–6	−2½	box
13	April 20	@ Mariners	7–3	**Sale** (2–1)	Noesí (1–2)		19,947	2:45	7–6	−2	box
14	April 21	@ Mariners	4–0	**Humber** (1–0)	Beavan (1–2)		22,472	2:17	8–6	−1½	box
15	April 22	@ Mariners	7–4	**Danks** (2–2)	Millwood (0–1)	**Santiago** (4)	19,975	2:56	9–6	−½	box
16	April 23	@ Athletics	4–0	**Peavy** (3–0)	Colón (3–2)		10,574	2:23	10–6	0	box
17	April 24	@ Athletics	0–2	Milone (3–1)	**Floyd** (1–3)	Balfour (5)	11,184	2:27	10–7	0	box
18	April 25	@ Athletics	4–5 (14)	Miller (1–0)	**Santiago** (0–1)		13,032	3:56	10–8	0	box
19	April 26	Red Sox	3–10	Doubront (1–0)	**Humber** (1–1)	Tazawa (1)	20,266	3:03	10–9	−½	box
20	April 27	Red Sox	3–10	Bard (2–2)	**Danks** (2–3)		20,414	2:47	10–10	−1	box
21	April 28	Red Sox	0–1	Lester (1–2)	**Peavy** (3–1)	Aceves (5)	20,057	2:44	10–11	−1	box
22	April 29	Red Sox	4–1	**Floyd** (2–3)	Beckett (2–3)	**Thornton** (1)	22,811	2:58	11–11	−1	box

May (18–11) – Home (8–6) – Road (10–5) – 156 R.S. 122 R.A.

#	Date	Opponent	Score	Win	Loss	Save	Attendance	Time	Record	GB	Box
23	May 1	Indians	7–2	**Sale** (3–1)	Jiménez (2–2)		15,212	2:41	12–11	0	box
24	May 2	Indians	3–6	Smith (1–0)	**Ohman** (0–1)	Perez (8)	15,192	2:46	12–12	−1	box
25	May 3	Indians	5–7	Masterson (1–2)	**Danks** (2–4)	Perez (9)	17,314	2:40	12–13	−2	box
26	May 4	@ Tigers	4–5	Valverde (2–0)	**Thornton** (1–1)		33,615	2:49	12–14	−3	box
27	May 5	@ Tigers	3–2	**Jones** (1–0)	Valverde (2–1)	**Reed** (1)	42,404	2:47	13–14	−2	box
28	May 6	@ Tigers	1–3	Porcello (3–2)	**Axelrod** (0–1)	Valverde (5)	39,558	3:10	13–15	−3	box
29	May 7	@ Indians	6–8	McAllister (1–0)	**Humber** (1–2)	Hagadone (1)	9,196	2:50	13–16	−4	box
30	May 7	@ Indians	2–3	Smith (2–1)	**Thornton** (1–2)	Sipp (1)	10,483	2:36	13–17	−5	box
31	May 8	@ Indians	5–3 (10)	**Santiago** (1–1)	Perez (0–1)	**Reed** (2)	11,304	3:03	14–17	−4	box
32	May 9	@ Indians	8–1	**Peavy** (4–1)	Gómez (2–2)		11,285	2:33	15–17	−3	box
33	May 11	Royals	5–0	**Floyd** (3–3)	Paulino (1–1)		19,129	2:43	16–17	−2½	box
34	May 12	Royals	0–5	Hochevar (3–3)	**Sale** (3–2)		20,066	2:46	16–18	−2½	box
35	May 13	Royals	1–9	Mendoza (2–2)	**Thornton** (1–3)		22,636	3:21	16–19	−2½	box
36	May 14	Tigers	7–5	**Stewart** (1–1)	Putkonen (0–2)	**Reed** (3)	23,538	3:01	17–19	−2½	box
37	May 15	Tigers	8–10	Balester (2–0)	**Ohman** (0–2)	Dotel (1)	21,473	3:42	17–20	−3½	box
38	May 16	@ Angels	2–7	Williams (4–1)	**Floyd** (3–4)		39,027	2:25	17–21	−4½	box
39	May 17	@ Angels	6–1	**Sale** (4–2)	Wilson (4–4)		30,786	3:10	18–21	−4½	box
40	May 18	@ Cubs	3–2	**Thornton** (2–3)	Samardzija (4–2)	**Reed** (4)	34,937	2:34	19–21	−3½	box
41	May 19	@ Cubs	7–4	**Danks** (3–4)	Dempster (0–2)		40,228	2:51	20–21	−3½	box
42	May 20	@ Cubs	6–0	**Peavy** (5–1)	Maholm (4–3)		38,374	2:57	21–21	−2½	box
43	May 22	Twins	2–9	Walters (2–1)	**Floyd** (3–5)		20,026	2:23	21–22	−3½	box
44	May 23	Twins	6–0	**Sale** (5–2)	Diamond (3–1)		20,064	2:28	22–22	−3½	box
45	May 24	Twins	11–8	**Jones** (2–0)	De Vries (0–1)		20,167	3:13	23–22	−3½	box
46	May 25	Indians	9–3	**Quintana** (1–0)	Gómez (3–3)		21,371	3:02	24–22	−2½	box
47	May 26	Indians	14–7	**Peavy** (6–1)	Lowe (6–3)		27,151	2:39	25–22	−1½	box
48	May 27	Indians	12–6	**Floyd** (4–5)	Jiménez (5–4)		22,182	3:13	26–22	−½	box
49	May 28	@ Rays	2–1	**Sale** (6–2)	Moore (1–5)	**Reed** (5)	22,227	2:34	27–22	−½	box
50	May 29	@ Rays	7–2	**Humber** (2–2)	Shields (6–3)		13,735	2:45	28–22	+½	box
51	May 30	@ Rays	4–3	**Jones** (3–0)	Cobb (2–1)	**Reed** (6)	13,369	2:58	29–22	+1½	box

June (13–14) – Home (7–8) – Road (6–6) – 124 R.S. 116 R.A.

#	Date	Opponent	Score	Win	Loss	Save	Attendance	Time	Record	GB	Box
52	June 1	Mariners	7–4	**Crain** (1–0)	Kelley (0–2)	**Reed** (7)	19,168	2:48	30–22	+1½	box
53	June 2	Mariners	8–10 (12)	Wilhelmsen (2–1)	**Reed** (0–1)	Iwakuma (2)	26,200	4:16	30–23	+1½	box
54	June 3	Mariners	4–2	**Sale** (7–2)	Millwood (3–5)		23,062	2:45	31–23	+2½	box
55	June 5	Blue Jays	5–9	Romero (7–1)	**Humber** (2–3)		23,107	2:44	31–24	+1½	box
56	June 6	Blue Jays	0–4	Morrow (7–3)	**Quintana** (1–1)		25,672	2:50	31–25	+½	box
57	June 7	Blue Jays	4–3	**Reed** (1–1)	Cordero (1–3)		25,743	2:50	32–25	+1½	box
58	June 8	Astros	3–8	Rodríguez (5–4)	**Floyd** (4–6)		22,452	3:09	32–26	+½	box
59	June 9	Astros	10–1	**Sale** (8–2)	Lyles (1–2)		22,880	2:44	33–26	+1½	box
60	June 10	Astros	9–11	Harrell (6–4)	**Humber** (2–4)	Myers (15)	20,398	3:01	33–27	+½	box
61	June 12	@ Cardinals	6–1	**Quintana** (2–1)	Wainwright (5–7)		40,972	2:40	34–27	+1½	box
62	June 13	@ Cardinals	0–1	Lynn (10–2)	**Peavy** (6–2)	Motte (12)	40,045	2:24	34–28	+1½	box
63	June 14	@ Cardinals	3–5	Westbrook (5–6)	**Floyd** (4–7)	Motte (13)	43,464	2:35	34–29	+1½	box
64	June 15	@ Dodgers	6–7	Belisario (2–0)	**Thornton** (2–4)	Jansen (11)	40,432	3:00	34–30	+½	box
65	June 16	@ Dodgers	5–4	**Humber** (3–4)	Billingsley (4–5)	**Reed** (8)	45,210	3:14	35–30	+1½	box
66	June 17	@ Dodgers	1–2	Belisario (3–0)	**Thornton** (2–5)		53,504	2:54	35–31	+1½	box
67	June 18	Cubs	3–12	Garza (3–5)	**Stewart** (1–2)		33,215	2:49	35–32	+½	box
68	June 19	Cubs	1–2	Wood (1–3)	**Peavy** (6–3)	Mármol (4)	30,282	2:41	35–33	−½	box
69	June 20	Cubs	7–0	**Floyd** (5–7)	Wells (1–2)		32,311	2:43	36–33	−½	box
70	June 22	Brewers	0–1 (10)	Greinke (8–2)	**Crain** (1–1)	Axford (13)	22,798	2:22	36–34	−1½	box
71	June 23	Brewers	8–6	**Crain** (2–1)	Veras (3–3)	**Reed** (9)	30,337	3:31	37–34	−½	box
72	June 24	Brewers	1–0 (10)	**Bruney** (1–0)	Parra (0–2)		26,545	3:15	38–34	+½	box
73	June 25	@ Twins	1–4	Liriano (2–7)	**Peavy** (6–4)	Burton (2)	35,659	3:01	38–35	+½	box
74	June 26	@ Twins	3–2	**Floyd** (6–7)	Hendriks (0–5)	**Reed** (10)	35,102	2:41	39–35	+1½	box
75	June 27	@ Twins	12–5	**Sale** (9–2)	Blackburn (4–5)		36,539	2:48	40–35	+2½	box
76	June 28	@ Yankees	4–3	**Santiago** (2–1)	Robertson (0–2)	**Reed** (11)	44,041	2:54	41–35	+2½	box
77	June 29	@ Yankees	14–7	**Quintana** (3–1)	Phelps (1–3)		44,265	3:24	42–35	+3½	box
78	June 30	@ Yankees	0–4	Kuroda (8–7)	**Peavy** (6–5)		46,895	2:25	42–36	+2½	box

July (14–11) – Home (8–1) – Road (6–10) – 124 R.S. 108 R.A.

#	Date	Opponent	Score	Win	Loss	Save	Attendance	Time	Record	GB	Box
79	July 1	@ Yankees	2–4	Hughes (9–6)	**Floyd** (6–8)	Soriano (18)	48,324	2:48	42–37	+1½	box
80	July 3	Rangers	19–2	**Sale** (10–2)	Oswalt (2–1)		30,183	2:58	43–37	+2	box
81	July 4	Rangers	5–4 (10)	**Reed** (2–1)	Adams (1–3)		30,271	3:22	44–37	+2	box
82	July 5	Rangers	2–1	**Quintana** (4–1)	Harrison (11–4)	**Reed** (12)	21,288	2:09	45–37	+2	box
83	July 6	Blue Jays	4–2	**Peavy** (7–5)	Laffey (0–1)	**Reed** (13)	27,129	2:31	46–37	+3	box
84	July 7	Blue Jays	2–0	**Floyd** (7–8)	Romero (8–4)	**Thornton** (2)	25,399	2:25	47–37	+3	box
85	July 8	Blue Jays	9–11	Frasor (1–1)	**Axelrod** (0–2)	Janssen (12)	27,190	3:48	47–38	+3	box
July 10: **All-Star Game** (NL Wins)			0–8	Cain	Verlander		40,933	2:59	box		
86	July 13	@ Royals	9–8 (14)	**Axelrod** (1–2)	Teaford (1–3)		32,744	5:23	48–38	+3	box
87	July 14	@ Royals	3–6	Hochevar (7–8)	**Peavy** (7–6)	Broxton (22)	24,998	2:56	48–39	+3	box
88	July 15	@ Royals	2–1	**Sale** (11–2)	Mendoza (3–6)	**Reed** (14)	25,714	2:52	49–39	+3½	box
89	July 16	@ Red Sox	1–5	Padilla (3–0)	**Séptimo** (0–1)		38,334	2:40	49–40	+2½	box
90	July 17	@ Red Sox	7–5	**Humber** (4–4)	Lester (5–7)	**Reed** (15)	37,771	3:06	50–40	+3½	box
91	July 18	@ Red Sox	1–10	Doubront (10–4)	**Hernández** (0–1)		37,367	2:50	50–41	+2½	box
92	July 19	@ Red Sox	1–3	Aceves (1–6)	**Thornton** (2–6)		38,413	2:47	50–42	+1½	box
93	July 20	@ Tigers	2–4	Verlander (11–5)	**Peavy** (7–7)	Valverde (18)	44,572	2:47	50–43	+½	box
94	July 21	@ Tigers	1–7	Porcello (7–5)	**Sale** (11–3)		42,888	2:11	50–44	−½	box
95	July 22	@ Tigers	4–6	Turner (1–1)	**Humber** (4–5)	Benoit (2)	41,281	3:00	50–45	−1½	box
96	July 23	Twins	7–4	**Floyd** (8–8)	Liriano (3–10)	**Reed** (16)	37,788	2:48	51–45	−1	box
97	July 24	Twins	11–4	**Jones** (4–0)	Fien (1–1)		34,715	3:08	52–45	0	box
98	July 25	Twins	8–2	**Peavy** (8–7)	Blackburn (4–6)		32,261	3:09	53–45	0	box
99	July 27	@ Rangers	9–5	**Sale** (12–3)	Darvish (11–7)		47,638	3:31	54–45	+1½	box
100	July 28	@ Rangers	5–2	**Humber** (5–5)	Harrison (12–6)		47,580	2:41	55–45	+2½	box
101	July 29	@ Rangers	0–2	Feldman (5–6)	**Floyd** (8–9)	Nathan (21)	46,744	2:38	55–46	+1½	box
102	July 30	@ Twins	6–7	Perkins (2–1)	**Myers** (0–5)		35,018	3:08	55–47	+1½	box
103	July 31	@ Twins	4–3	**Thornton** (3–6)	Gray (5–1)	**Reed** (17)	36,424	2:41	56–47	+2½	box

August (16–12) – Home (11–4) – Road (5–8) – 128 R.S. 118 R.A.

#	Date	Opponent	Score	Win	Loss	Save	Attendance	Time	Record	GB	Box
104	August 1	@ Twins	3–2	**Peavy** (9–7)	Diamond (9–5)	**Reed** (18)	34,823	2:49	57–47	+2½	box
105	August 3	Angels	8–6 (10)	**Thornton** (4–6)	Takahashi (0–3)		32,060	3:35	58–47	+2½	box
106	August 4	Angels	5–6 (10)	Jepsen (2–1)	**Thornton** (4–7)	Frieri (13)	28,571	3:26	58–48	+1½	box
107	August 5	Angels	4–2	**Jones** (5–0)	Isringhausen (3–2)	**Reed** (19)	30,202	2:58	59–48	+1½	box
108	August 6	Royals	4–2	**Sale** (13–3)	Mendoza (5–8)	**Reed** (20)	30,097	2:17	60–48	+1½	box
109	August 7	Royals	2–5	Chen (8–9)	**Peavy** (9–8)	Holland (2)	27,194	2:34	60–49	+½	box
110	August 8	Royals	1–2	Guthrie (4–12)	**Quintana** (4–2)	Holland (3)	25,151	2:37	60–50	+½	box
111	August 10	Athletics	4–3	**Myers** (1–5)	Neshek (1–1)		25,041	2:53	61–50	+1	box
112	August 11	Athletics	7–9	Cook (5–2)	**Thornton** (4–8)	Balfour (8)	26,686	3:38	61–51	+1	box
113	August 12	Athletics	7–3	**Sale** (14–3)	Colón (9–9)		25,106	2:53	62–51	+2	box
114	August 13	@ Blue Jays	2–3 (11)	Delabar (3–1)	**Séptimo** (0–2)		16,828	3:05	62–52	+2	box
115	August 14	@ Blue Jays	3–2	**Quintana** (5–2)	Álvarez (7–10)	**Reed** (21)	18,919	2:31	63–52	+2	box
116	August 15	@ Blue Jays	9–5	**Floyd** (9–9)	Romero (8–10)		20,119	2:39	64–52	+2	box
117	August 16	@ Blue Jays	7–2	**Liriano** (4–10)	Laffey (3–4)		19,855	2:34	65–52	+2½	box
118	August 17	@ Royals	2–4	Mendoza (7–8)	**Sale** (14–4)	Holland (5)	22,169	2:31	65–53	+1½	box
119	August 18	@ Royals	4–9	Chen (9–10)	**Peavy** (9–9)		23,858	2:59	65–54	+1½	box
120	August 19	@ Royals	2–5	Holland (6–3)	**Crain** (2–2)		22,401	2:43	65–55	+1½	box
121	August 20	Yankees	9–6	**Myers** (2–5)	Logan (4–2)	**Reed** (22)	27,561	3:44	66–55	+2	box
122	August 21	Yankees	7–3	**Liriano** (5–10)	Nova (11–7)		24,247	2:37	67–55	+2	box
123	August 22	Yankees	2–1	**Sale** (15–4)	Hughes (12–11)	**Reed** (23)	26,319	2:27	68–55	+2	box
124	August 24	Mariners	9–8	**Reed** (3–1)	Wilhelmsen (4–3)		25,058	3:00	69–55	+2½	box
125	August 25	Mariners	5–4	**Jones** (6–0)	Beavan (8–8)	**Reed** (24)	27,562	3:15	70–55	+2½	box
126	August 26	Mariners	4–3 (7)	**Jones** (7–0)	Millwood (4–11)		23,146	2:22	71–55	+2½	box
127	August 27	@ Orioles	3–4	Strop (5–2)	**Myers** (2–6)	Johnson (40)	10,955	3:06	71–56	+2	box
128	August 28	@ Orioles	0–6	Tillman (7–2)	**Sale** (15–5)		12,841	2:30	71–57	+2	box
129	August 29	@ Orioles	8–1	**Axelrod** (2–2)	Saunders (6–11)		13,098	2:51	72–57	+3	box
130	August 30	@ Orioles	3–5	Britton (4–1)	**Quintana** (5–3)	Johnson (41)	10,141	2:31	72–58	+3	box
131	August 31	@ Tigers	4–7	Dotel (5–2)	**Peavy** (9–10)	Valverde (27)	36,721	3:10	72–59	+2	box

September/October (13–18) – Home (7–10) – Road (6–8) – 130 R.S. 128 R.A.

#	Date	Opponent	Score	Win	Loss	Save	Attendance	Time	Record	GB	Box
132	September 1	@ Tigers	1–5	Scherzer (15–6)	**Liriano** (5–11)		40,059	3:17	72–60	+1	box
133	September 2	@ Tigers	2–4	Verlander (13–7)	**Sale** (15–6)	Valverde (28)	42,192	2:52	72–61	0	box
134	September 3	Twins	4–2	**Santiago** (3–1)	Deduno (5–3)	**Reed** (25)	21,676	3:00	73–61	+1	box
135	September 4	Twins	9–18	Diamond (11–6)	**Quintana** (5–4)		15,698	3:24	73–62	+1	box
136	September 5	Twins	6–2	**Peavy** (10–10)	Walters (2–3)		17,336	2:40	74–62	+1	box
137	September 7	Royals	5–7	Herrera (2–2)	**Reed** (3–2)	Holland (12)	26,660	3:02	74–63	+1	box
138	September 8	Royals	5–4	**Sale** (16–6)	Chen (10–12)	**Reed** (26)	26,227	2:48	75–63	+2	box
139	September 9	Royals	1–2 (10)	Herrera (3–2)	**Myers** (2–7)	Holland (13)	19,356	3:30	75–64	+2	box
140	September 10	Tigers	6–1	**Quintana** (6–4)	Porcello (9–12)		30,287	2:54	76–64	+3	box
141	September 11	Tigers	3–5	Fister (9–8)	**Peavy** (10–11)	Valverde (29)	26,504	3:15	76–65	+2	box
142	September 12	Tigers	6–8	Scherzer (9–8)	**Floyd** (9–10)	Valverde (30)	30,667	3:25	76–66	+1	box
–	September 13	Tigers	Postponed (rain); rescheduled September 17							+1	
143	September 14	@ Twins	6–0	**Sale** (17–6)	Vásquez (0–2)		30,729	2:48	77–66	+1	box
144	September 15	@ Twins	5–3	**Liriano** (6–11)	Deduno (6–4)	**Thornton** (3)	36,308	2:39	78–66	+1	box
145	September 16	@ Twins	9–2	**Peavy** (11–11)	Diamond (11–8)		31,722	2:55	79–66	+2	box
146	September 17	Tigers	5–4	**Jones** (8–0)	Fister (9–9)	**Reed** (27)	29,130	3:07	80–66	+3	box
147	September 18	@ Royals	3–2	**Floyd** (10–10)	Hochevar (8–14)	**Reed** (28)	14,420	2:12	81–66	+3	box
148	September 19	@ Royals	0–3	Chen (11–12)	**Sale** (17–7)	Holland (14)	15,120	2:51	81–67	+2	box
149	September 20	@ Royals	3–4	Holland (7–4)	**Crain** (2–3)		14,710	2:41	81–68	+2	box
150	September 21	@ Angels	2–6	Santana (9–12)	**Peavy** (11–12)		39,326	2:32	81–69	+1½	box
151	September 22	@ Angels	2–4	Haren (12–11)	**Quintana** (6–5)	Frieri (20)	41,440	2:48	81–70	+½	box
152	September 23	@ Angels	1–4	Weaver (19–4)	**Floyd** (10–11)		36,546	2:39	81–71	+1	box
153	September 24	Indians	5–4	**Myers** (3–7)	Pestano (3–3)	**Veal** (1)	20,206	2:37	82–71	+1	box
154	September 25	Indians	3–4	Kluber (2–4)	**Liriano** (6–12)	Perez (37)	13,797	2:35	82–72	0	box
155	September 26	Indians	4–6	Sipp (1–2)	**Thornton** (4–9)	Perez (38)	20,166	3:44	82–73	−1	box
156	September 27	Rays	2–3	Peralta (2–6)	**Myers** (3–8)	Rodney (46)	18,630	3:11	82–74	−2	box
157	September 28	Rays	3–1	**Floyd** (11–11)	Hellickson (9–11)	**Reed** (29)	25,264	3:08	83–74	−1	box
158	September 29	Rays	4–10	Moore (11–11)	**Sale** (17–8)	Archer (1)	26,559	3:19	83–75	−2	box
159	September 30	Rays	2–6	Price (20–5)	**Quintana** (6–6)		26,831	3:06	83–76	−3	box
160	October 1	@ Indians	11–0	**Santiago** (4–1)	Kluber (2–5)		14,756	3:02	84–76	−3	box
161	October 2	@ Indians	3–4 (12)	Seddon (1–1)	**Thornton** (4–10)		10,015	3:23	84–77	−3	box
162	October 3	@ Indians	9–0	**Floyd** (12–11)	Huff (3–1)		18,093	2:50	85–77	−3	box

== Roster ==
2012 Chicago White Sox
Roster
Pitchers: 39,33 Dylan Axelrod; 40 Brian Bruney; 26 Jesse Crain; 50 John Danks; 34 Gavin Floyd; 60 Deunte Heath; 58 Pedro Hernández; 41 Philip Humber; 65 Nate Jones; 58 Francisco Liriano; 57 Jhan Mariñez; 33,39 Brett Myers; 77 Will Ohman; 48 Brian Omogrosso; 44 Jake Peavy; 62 José Quintana; 43 Addison Reed; 49 Chris Sale; 53 Hector Santiago; 52 Leyson Séptimo; 48 Zach Stewart; 52 Eric Stults; 37 Matt Thornton; 46 Donnie Veal	Catchers: 17 Tyler Flowers; 38 Héctor Giménez; 12 A. J. Pierzynski; Infielders: 15 Gordon Beckham; 32 Adam Dunn; 38 Eduardo Escobar; 5 Orlando Hudson; 29 Dan Johnson; 14 Paul Konerko; 18 Brent Lillibridge; 18 José López; 22 Brent Morel; 66 Ray Olmedo; 10 Alexei Ramírez; 20 Kevin Youkilis; Outfielders: 20,7 Jordan Danks; 30 Alejandro De Aza; 1 Kosuke Fukudome; 51 Alex Ríos; 24 Dayán Viciedo; 28 DeWayne Wise	Manager: 23 Robin Ventura; Coaches: 3 Harold Baines (first base); 21 Don Cooper (pitching); 31 Jeff Manto (hitting); 47 Joe McEwing (third base); 36 Juan Nieves (bullpen); 8 Mark Parent (bench); 59 Mark Salas (bullpen catcher)

== Player stats ==
Stats through October 3, 2012

=== Batting ===
Note: G = Games played; AB = At bats; R = Runs scored; H = Hits; 2B = Doubles; 3B = Triples; HR = Home runs; RBI = Runs batted in; BB = Base on balls; SO = Strikeouts; AVG = Batting average; SB = Stolen bases

Player	G	AB	R	H	2B	3B	HR	RBI	BB	SO	AVG	SB
Gordon Beckham, 2B	151	525	62	123	24	0	16	60	40	89	.234	5
John Danks, P	1	3	0	0	0	0	0	0	0	0	.000	0
Jordan Danks, OF	50	67	12	15	1	0	1	4	6	16	.224	3
Alejandro De Aza, CF	131	524	81	147	29	6	9	50	47	109	.281	26
Adam Dunn, DH, 1B, LF	151	539	87	110	19	0	41	96	105	222	.204	2
Eduardo Escobar, 3B, SS, 2B	37	87	14	18	4	1	0	3	9	23	.207	2
Tyler Flowers, C, 1B	52	136	19	29	6	0	7	13	12	56	.213	2
Kosuke Fukudome, OF	24	41	2	6	1	0	0	4	8	9	.171	0
Héctor Giménez, C	5	11	1	5	0	0	0	1	0	3	.455	0
Orlando Hudson, 3B, 2B	51	137	10	27	3	3	2	17	12	24	.197	3
Philip Humber, P	2	5	0	1	0	0	0	1	0	2	.200	0
Dan Johnson, DH, 1B	14	22	8	8	1	0	3	6	9	3	.364	0
Paul Konerko, 1B, DH	144	533	66	159	22	0	26	75	56	83	.298	0
Brent Lillibridge, OF, 1B, 3B	48	63	10	11	1	0	0	2	4	26	.175	7
José López, 3B	15	23	2	5	1	0	0	0	1	6	.217	0
Brent Morel, 3B	35	113	14	20	2	0	0	5	7	36	.177	4
Ray Olmedo, 3B, 2B, SS	20	41	8	10	2	0	0	1	0	9	.244	0
Jake Peavy, P	2	5	1	0	0	0	0	1	0	3	.000	0
A. J. Pierzynski, C	135	479	68	133	18	4	27	77	28	78	.278	0
José Quintana, P	2	3	0	0	0	0	0	0	1	3	.000	0
Alexei Ramírez, SS	158	593	59	157	24	4	9	73	16	77	.265	20
Alex Ríos, RF	157	605	93	184	37	8	25	91	26	92	.304	23
Chris Sale, P	1	2	0	0	0	0	0	0	0	2	.000	0
Dayán Viciedo, LF	147	505	64	129	18	1	25	78	28	120	.255	0
DeWayne Wise, OF	45	163	20	42	7	1	5	22	9	40	.258	12
Kevin Youkilis, 3B, 1B	80	292	47	69	8	1	15	46	37	69	.236	0
Team totals	162	5518	748	1409	228	29	211	726	461	1203	.255	109

=== Pitching ===
Note: W = Wins; L = Losses; ERA = Earned run average; G = Games pitched; GS = Games started; SV = Saves; IP = Innings pitched; H = Hits allowed; R = Runs allowed; ER = Earned runs allowed; HR = Home runs allowed; BB = Walks allowed; K = Strikeouts

Player	W	L	ERA	G	GS	SV	IP	H	R	ER	HR	BB	K
Dylan Axelrod	2	2	5.47	14	7	0	51.0	56	32	31	8	21	40
Brian Bruney	1	0	0.00	1	0	0	1.0	0	0	0	0	2	2
Jesse Crain	2	3	2.44	51	0	0	48.0	29	14	13	5	23	60
John Danks	3	4	5.70	9	9	0	53.2	57	35	34	7	23	30
Gavin Floyd	12	11	4.29	29	29	0	168.0	166	84	80	22	63	144
Deunte Heath	0	0	4.50	3	0	0	2.0	1	1	1	1	1	1
Pedro Hernández	0	1	18.00	1	1	0	4.0	12	8	8	3	1	2
Philip Humber	5	5	6.44	26	16	0	102.0	113	74	73	23	44	85
Nate Jones	8	0	2.39	65	0	0	71.2	67	19	19	4	32	65
Francisco Liriano	3	2	5.40	12	11	0	56.2	54	34	34	7	32	58
Jhan Mariñez	0	0	0.00	2	0	0	2.2	2	0	0	0	2	1
Brett Myers	3	4	3.12	35	0	0	34.2	30	13	12	4	9	21
Will Ohman	0	2	6.41	32	0	0	26.2	23	19	19	6	5	13
Brian Omogrosso	0	0	2.57	17	0	0	21.0	20	6	6	3	9	18
Jake Peavy	11	12	3.37	32	32	0	219.0	191	88	82	27	49	194
José Quintana	6	6	3.76	25	22	0	136.1	142	62	57	14	42	81
Addison Reed	3	2	4.75	62	0	29	55.0	57	30	29	6	18	54
Chris Sale	17	8	3.05	30	29	0	192.0	167	66	65	19	51	192
Hector Santiago	4	1	3.33	42	4	4	70.1	54	26	26	10	40	79
Leyson Séptimo	0	2	5.02	21	0	0	14.1	8	8	8	3	6	14
Zach Stewart	1	2	6.00	18	1	0	30.0	41	26	20	10	4	16
Eric Stults	0	0	2.70	2	1	0	6.2	6	2	2	0	4	4
Matt Thornton	4	10	3.46	74	0	3	65.0	63	27	25	4	17	53
Donnie Veal	0	0	1.38	24	0	1	13.0	5	2	2	0	4	19
DeWayne Wise	0	0	0.00	1	0	0	1.0	1	0	0	0	1	0
Team totals	85	77	4.02	162	162	37	1445.2	1365	676	646	186	503	1246

== Farm system ==
Level	Team	League	Manager
AAA	Charlotte Knights	International League	Joel Skinner
AA	Birmingham Barons	Southern League	Bobby Magallanes
A	Winston-Salem Dash	Carolina League	Tommy Thompson
A	Kannapolis Intimidators	South Atlantic League	Julio Vinas
Rookie	Bristol White Sox	Appalachian League	Pete Rose Jr.
Rookie	Great Falls Voyagers	Pioneer League	Ryan Newman
