= Dayán Viciedo =

Cuban baseball player (born 1989)

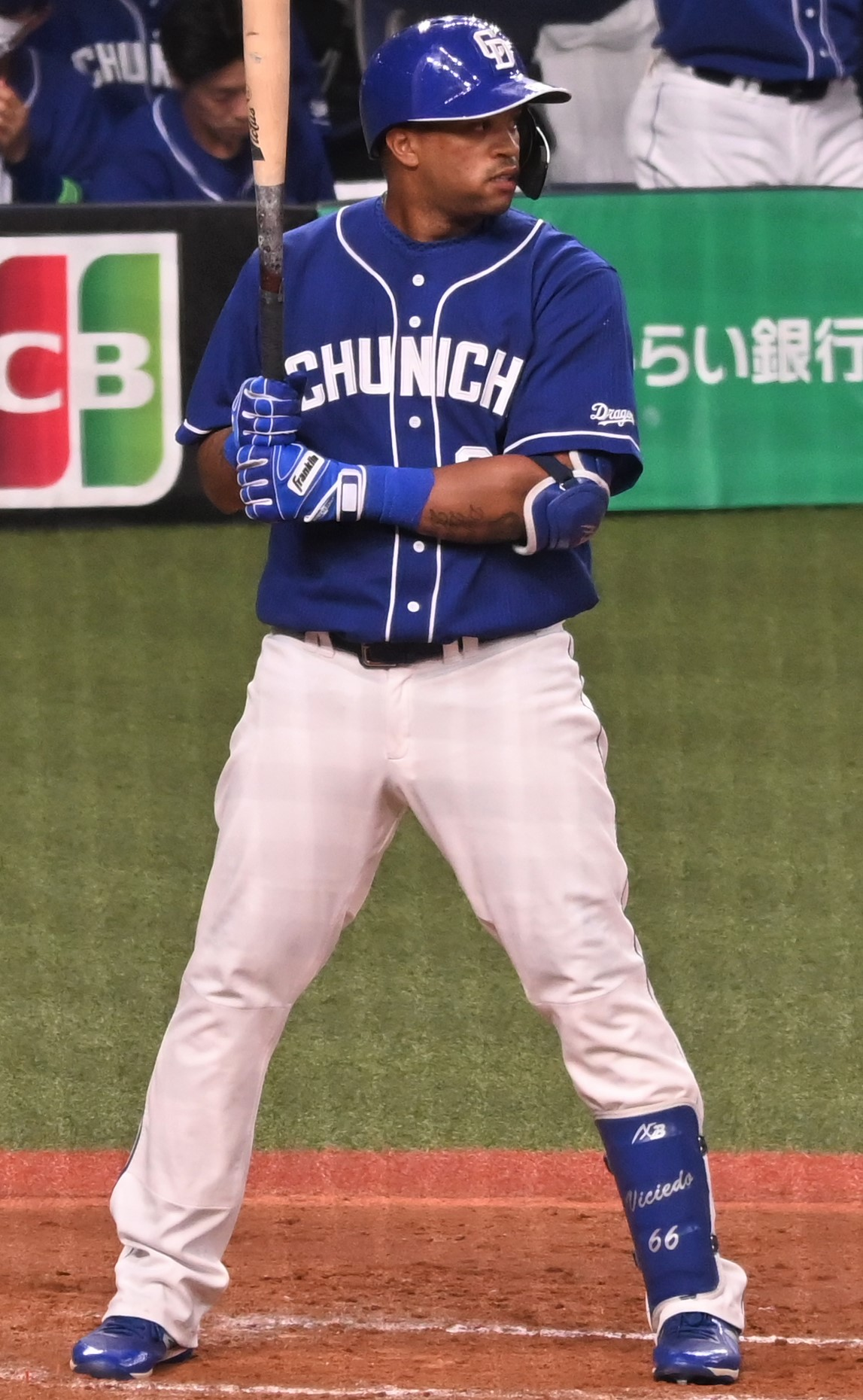
- Viciedo with the Chunichi Dragons in 2022
- Outfielder / First baseman
- Born: March 10, 1989 (age 37); Remedios, Villa Clara Province, Cuba
- Batted: Right Threw: Right

Professional debut
- MLB: June 20, 2010, for the Chicago White Sox
- NPB: March 26, 2016, for the Chunichi Dragons

Last appearance
- MLB: September 28, 2014, for the Chicago White Sox
- NPB: May 23, 2026, for the Yokohama DeNA BayStars

MLB statistics
- Batting average: .254
- Home runs: 66
- Runs batted in: 211

NPB statistics
- Batting average: .286
- Home runs: 142
- Runs batted in: 561
- Stats at Baseball Reference

Teams
- Chicago White Sox (2010–2014); Chunichi Dragons (2016–2024); Yokohama DeNA BayStars (2025–2026)

Career highlights and awards
- 2× Central League Best Nine (2018–2019); Central League batting title (2018); 2× NPB Golden Glove Award (2020–2021); 3× NPB All-Star (2016, 2021, 2022); Interleague play CL Nippon Life Award Winner (2021); NPB All-Star Fighting Player Award (2022)

Dayán Viciedo Pérez (born March 10, 1989) is a Cuban former professional baseball infielder. He played in Major League Baseball (MLB) for the Chicago White Sox from 2010 to 2014, and in Nippon Professional Baseball (NPB) for the Chunichi Dragons and Yokohama DeNA BayStars from 2016 to 2026.

== Early life ==
Viciedo entered Cuba's National Series at age 15 for Villa Clara, and was often compared to Cuban legend Omar Linares, his idol.

Viciedo struggled in his first season in the national series, hitting only .243 through the season's first 50 games. However, in his second season, at age sixteen, he hit .337 with 14 home runs. Viciedo was selected to Cuba's provisional 60-player roster for the 2006 World Baseball Classic, but was not included in the final team. On May 20, 2008, Viciedo defected from Cuba with his family on a boat bound for Mexico. Once in Mexico he crossed the border to the United States and went to Miami where he was reunited with some of his family. He was approved as a declared free agent by Major League Baseball on November 10, 2008.

== Professional career ==
=== Chicago White Sox ===
==== Minor leagues ====
Viciedo agreed to a four-year, $10 million contract with the Chicago White Sox on December 12, 2008. The contract included a $4 million signing bonus, and paid $1 million in 2009, $1.25 million in 2010 and 2011, as well as $2.5 million in 2012. Signing with the White Sox reunited him with fellow Cuban countryman, Alexei Ramírez.

Viciedo began the 2009 season with the Double–A Birmingham Barons of the Southern League. During the season, he hit .280 with 12 home runs and 78 RBI.

Viciedo was batting .290, with 14 home runs and 34 RBI in 238 at bats with Triple–A Charlotte Knights before getting called up by the Chicago White Sox on June 17, 2010. He finished the season batting .274 with 20 home runs and 47 RBI in 343 at-bats.

Viciedo moved to right field at the beginning of the 2011 season in an attempt to get him up to the Major League level faster. He was batting .296, with 20 home runs and 78 RBI in 452 at bats with Triple–A Charlotte before being called up by the White Sox on August 26, 2011, because of an injury to Carlos Quentin.

==== Major leagues ====
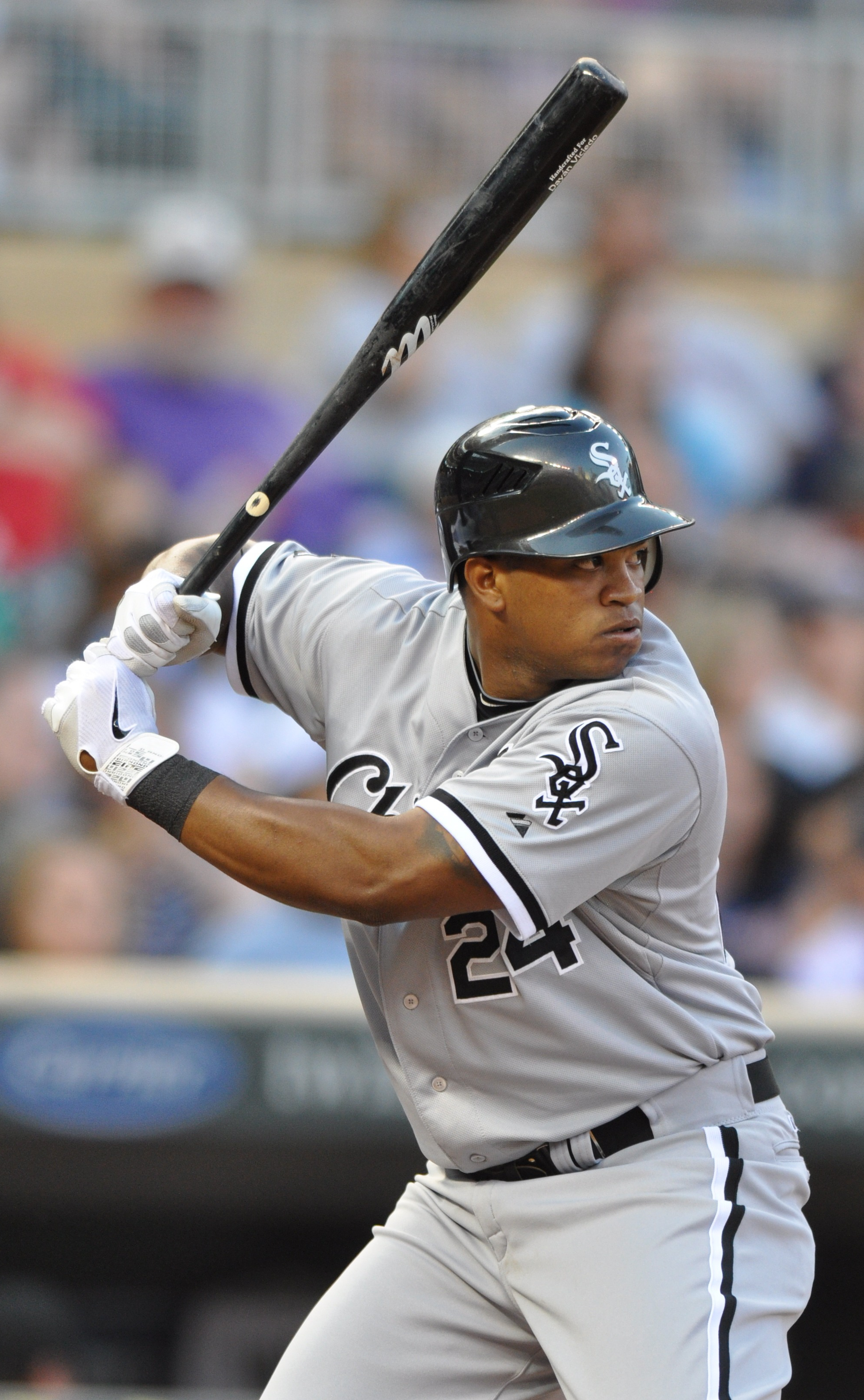
Viciedo with the Chicago White Sox in 2012

On June 17, 2010, it was announced that Viciedo would be called up to the major leagues for the first time. In his first Major League game against the Washington Nationals he recorded his first hit en route to a White Sox 6–3 win. Viciedo recorded his first Major League home run on July 5, against Scott Kazmir of the Los Angeles Angels of Anaheim, and two days later, on July 7, recorded his first career double against Joe Saunders of the Los Angeles Angels of Anaheim. In 2010, he played in 38 games and batted .308 with 5 home runs and 13 RBI. In 2011, Viciedo appeared in 29 games and hit .255 with 1 home run and 6 RBI. He would take on a starting role in 2012, and hit career-highs with games played (147), home runs (25), and RBI (78) while recording a .255 batting average.

In 2013, Viciedo suffered an oblique strain in April that required a stint on the 15-day disabled list. In 124 games he would hit .265 with 14 home runs and 56 RBI. 2014 would see Viciedo play in 145 games, batting a career-low .231 with 21 home runs and 58 RBI. He signed a one-year contract worth $4.4 million with the White Sox on January 12, 2015, to avoid arbitration. However, he was designated for assignment on January 28, and released on February 4.

=== Oakland Athletics ===
On March 1, 2015, Viciedo signed a minor league contract with the Toronto Blue Jays. He would have earned $2.5 million if he made the 25-man roster, however he requested and was granted his release on March 31.

On June 12, 2015, Viciedo signed a minor league contract with the Oakland Athletics. He was released on July 30 after hitting just .221 in 113 at bats for the Athletics' Triple–A club, the Nashville Sounds.

=== Chicago White Sox (second stint) ===
On August 1, 2015, Viciedo signed a minor league contract to return to the Chicago White Sox organization. In 36 appearances for the Triple-A Charlotte Knights, Viciedo batted .341/.401/.544 with seven home runs and 20 RBI.

=== Chunichi Dragons ===
On December 1, 2015, Viciedo signed a one–year, $1.4 million contract with the Chunichi Dragons of Nippon Professional Baseball. Viciedo started his Japanese career hitting a Japanese record for a foreign player, with three home runs in the first three opening games against the Hanshin Tigers at the Kyocera Dome. Viciedo was selected for Central League in the 2016 NPB All Star Game as back-up at first base; in 119 appearances on the year, he slashed .274/.352/.486 with 22 home runs and 68 RBI. He made 87 appearances for the Dragons during the 2017 campaign, batting .250/.319/.452 with 18 home runs, 49 RBI, and four stolen bases.

In the 2018 NPB season, Viciedo slashed .348/.419/.555 with 26 homers to claim the batting average and hits title leading to selection in the Central League Best 9. On December 12, 2018, it was announced Viciedo had signed a new three-year contract with the Dragons with a total value of ¥1.1 billion ($9.9 million). He played in 143 games for Chunichi in 2019, hitting .315/.374/.496 with 18 home runs and 93 RBI.

Viciedo made 109 appearances for the team during the 2020 season, and batted .267/.329/.447 with 17 home runs and 82 RBI. On August 27, 2021, Viciedo reached 450 RBI in NPB, giving him the most RBI for a non-Japanese player in Chunichi Dragons history. On September 26, Viciedo collected his 765th hit for the Dragons, passing Alonzo Powell for the most hits by a non-Japanese player in club history. He finished the year with a .275/.333/.433 batting line, as well as 17 home runs and 70 RBI. On December 1, Viciedo agreed to a three-year contract extension with the Dragons.

Viciedo made 129 appearances for the Dragons during the 2022 season, batting .294/.355/.437 with 14 home runs and 63 RBI. On September 24, 2023, Viciedo collected his 1,000th NPB hit with an infield single off of Hiroto Saiki of the Hanshin Tigers. He became the 317th player in NPB history to achieve the feat, as well as the only foreign player in Dragons history to do so. He made 91 total appearances for the Dragons over the course of the season, hitting .244/.311/.330 with six home runs and 23 RBI.

Viciedo played in 15 games for Chunichi in 2024, hitting .209/.261/.302 with one home run and two RBI. On October 6, 2024, it was announced that Viciedo would not be retained after 2024, making him a free agent.

=== Tecolotes de los Dos Laredos ===
On May 8, 2025, Viciedo signed with the Tecolotes de los Dos Laredos of the Mexican League. In 38 appearances for the Tecolotes, Viciedo batted .276/.359/.462 with eight home runs and 31 RBI.

=== Yokohama DeNA BayStars ===
On July 7, 2025, Viciedo signed with the Yokohama DeNA BayStars of Nippon Professional Baseball. On September 28, Viciedo played in his 1,000th career NPB game, becoming the 541st player to reach the mark. He made 43 appearances for the BayStars, batting .259/.322/.383 with two home runs and six RBI.

On November 29, 2025, Viciedo re-signed with the BayStars. On May 23, 2026, Viciedo announced his retirement from professional baseball.

== See also ==
- List of baseball players who defected from Cuba
