= Matt Treanor =

American baseball player (born 1976)

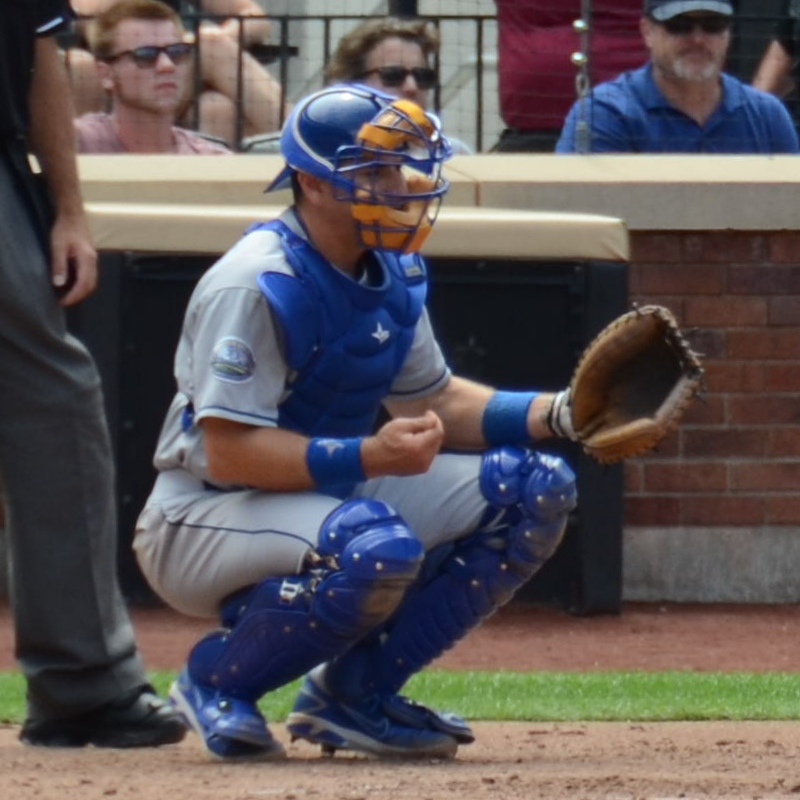
- Treanor with the Los Angeles Dodgers in 2012
- Catcher
- Born: March 3, 1976 (age 49); Garden Grove, California, U.S.
- Batted: Right Threw: Right

MLB debut
- June 2, 2004, for the Florida Marlins

Last MLB appearance
- September 26, 2012, for the Los Angeles Dodgers

MLB statistics
- Batting average: .221
- Home runs: 18
- Runs batted in: 129
- Stats at Baseball Reference

Teams
- Florida Marlins (2004–2008); Detroit Tigers (2009); Texas Rangers (2010); Kansas City Royals (2011); Texas Rangers (2011); Los Angeles Dodgers (2012)

Matthew Aaron Treanor (born March 3, 1976) is an American former professional baseball catcher in Major League Baseball (MLB). He played for the Florida Marlins, Detroit Tigers, Texas Rangers, Kansas City Royals, and Los Angeles Dodgers.

== Early life ==
Treanor attended Mater Dei High School in Santa Ana, California and was a standout baseball player. As a senior, he was a second-team All-America pick and was named to the all-tournament team at the Upper Deck high school baseball tournament.

== Professional career ==
=== Kansas City Royals ===
Treanor was drafted by the Kansas City Royals as a high school player in 1994 MLB draft. He played with the Gulf Coast Royals in 1994, the Springfield Sultans in 1995, the Lansing Lugnuts in 1996 and the Wilmington Blue Rocks in 1997.

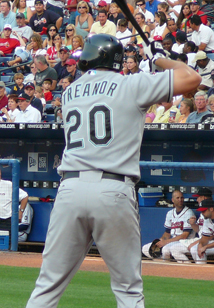
Treanor with the Florida Marlins in June 2007

=== Florida Marlins ===
Treanor was traded to the Florida Marlins in 1997 for Matt Whisenant. Treanor spent 10 years in the minor leagues–seven in Single-A—before finally making his MLB debut on June 2, 2004 against the Cincinnati Reds, when he went 1 for 3 with a run scored. In the highlight of his season, Treanor recorded his first RBI on a walk-off single against the Chicago White Sox on June 17.

He played with the Marlins' Triple-A affiliate, the Calgary Cannons then the Albuquerque Isotopes, being called up to the MLB twice in 2004. In 2005, Treanor played his first full season with the Marlins, as a backup to starting catcher Paul Lo Duca. He showed off his defensive prowess on April 15 against the Washington Nationals, when he threw out all three base runners who attempted to steal. Treanor hit his first MLB home run, against Daniel Cabrera of the Baltimore Orioles on June 20, 2006. In 2006, he led NL catchers in caught stealing percentage, at 47.1%.

On December 10, 2008, Treanor was released by the Florida Marlins in order to make room on the team's 40-man roster for the Rule 5 draft on December 11, 2008.

=== Detroit Tigers ===
On December 18, 2008, Treanor signed with the Detroit Tigers. In April 2009, he suffered from a bone spur on his right hip and was placed on the disabled list for the remainder of the season. He was released from the Tigers at the conclusion of the 2009 season and granted free agency. Treanor only played in four games with Detroit.

=== Texas Rangers ===
On December 18, 2009, Treanor signed a minor league contract with the Milwaukee Brewers with an invitation to spring training, however on March 22 he was traded to the Texas Rangers in exchange for Ray Olmedo. On April 27, Treanor doubled and homered against the White Sox, a game in which he had his first extra base hits with the Rangers. On June 15, Treanor returned to Florida to face his former team for the first time in interleague play, and hit a go-ahead two-RBI triple in the ninth inning and lifted the Rangers to a 3–2 win. On July 23, Treanor was injured trying to beat a throw to first base when he tripped over Angels' first baseman Kevin Frandsen.

=== Kansas City Royals ===
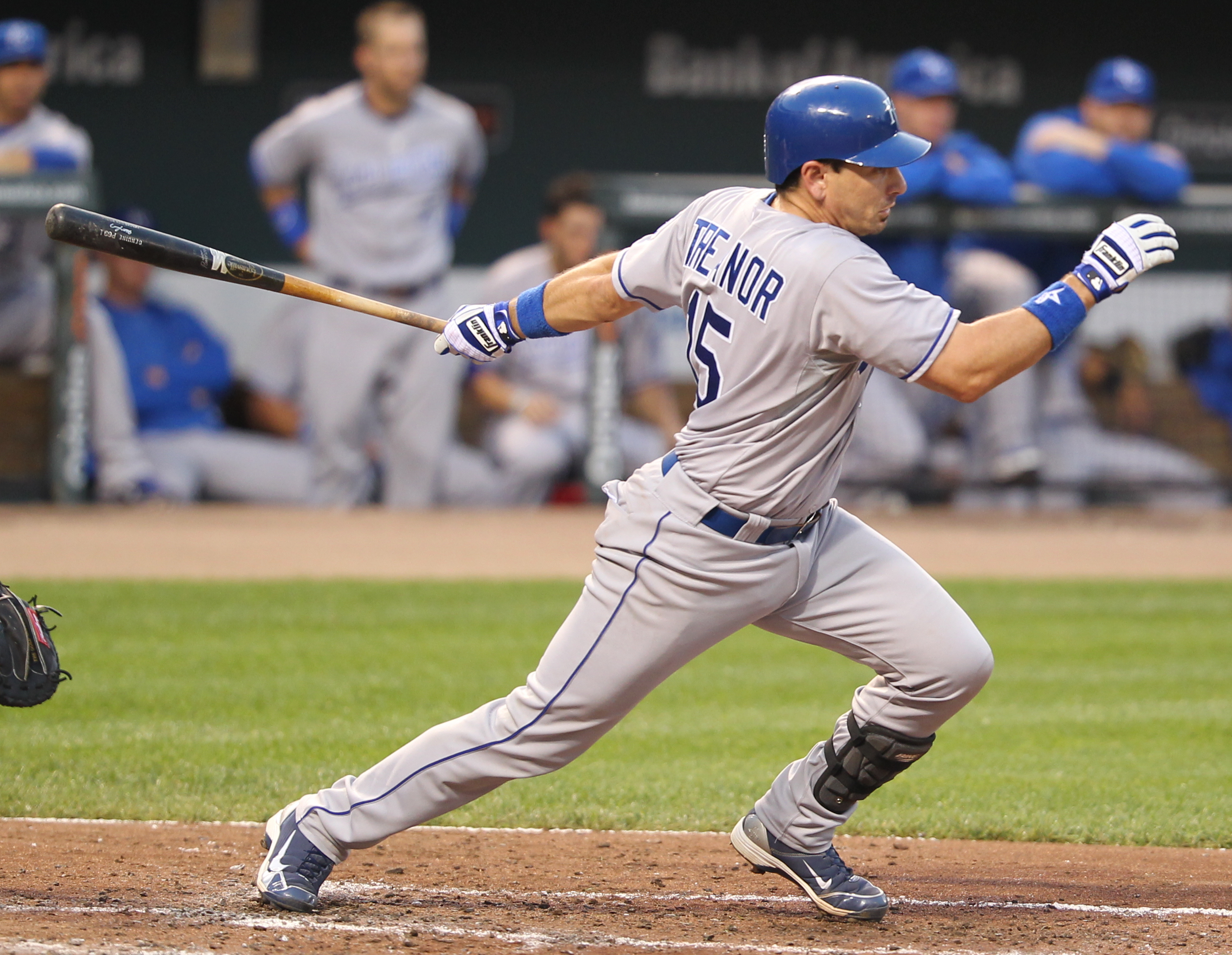
Treanor batting for the Kansas City Royals in 2011

On March 28, 2011, the Rangers traded Treanor to the Kansas City Royals for cash considerations. He was the 2011 Opening Day catcher for the Royals. On April 3, he hit a three-run walk-off homer in the 13th inning to beat the Anaheim Angels 12–9. On July 31, he was placed on the seven-day disabled list with a concussion after a collision with Matt LaPorta of the Cleveland Indians.

=== Return to the Texas Rangers ===
On August 31, 2011, the Royals traded Treanor to the Texas Rangers for cash considerations. In 2011, he batted .214 with 3 home runs, between the two teams.

=== Los Angeles Dodgers ===
On November 15, 2011, Treanor signed a one-year contract with the Los Angeles Dodgers. Serving as the backup to Dodgers catcher A.J. Ellis, he spot-started throughout the season. On July 22, in New York, Treanor hit a two-run single in the top of the 12th inning, sparking a 5-run rally to beat the New York Mets 8-3. He played in 36 games in 2012 for the Dodgers, hitting .175. On October 29, the Dodgers elected to decline Treanor's club option for 2013 worth $950K, instead paying him the $150K buyout.

=== Cleveland Indians ===
On December 17, 2013, Treanor signed a minor league deal, with an invitation to spring training, with the Cleveland Indians. He retired on May 8, 2014.

== Personal life ==
In November 2003, Treanor met beach volleyball star Misty May at a sports therapy facility in California. They became engaged in March 2004 and married that November. They have three daughters: Malia Barbara, born on June 3, 2014, as well as twins, Mele Elizarin and Mia Kanoelani, born in November 2017. They reside in Long Beach, California.
