= Pedro Hernández (pitcher) =

Venezuelan baseball player (born 1989)

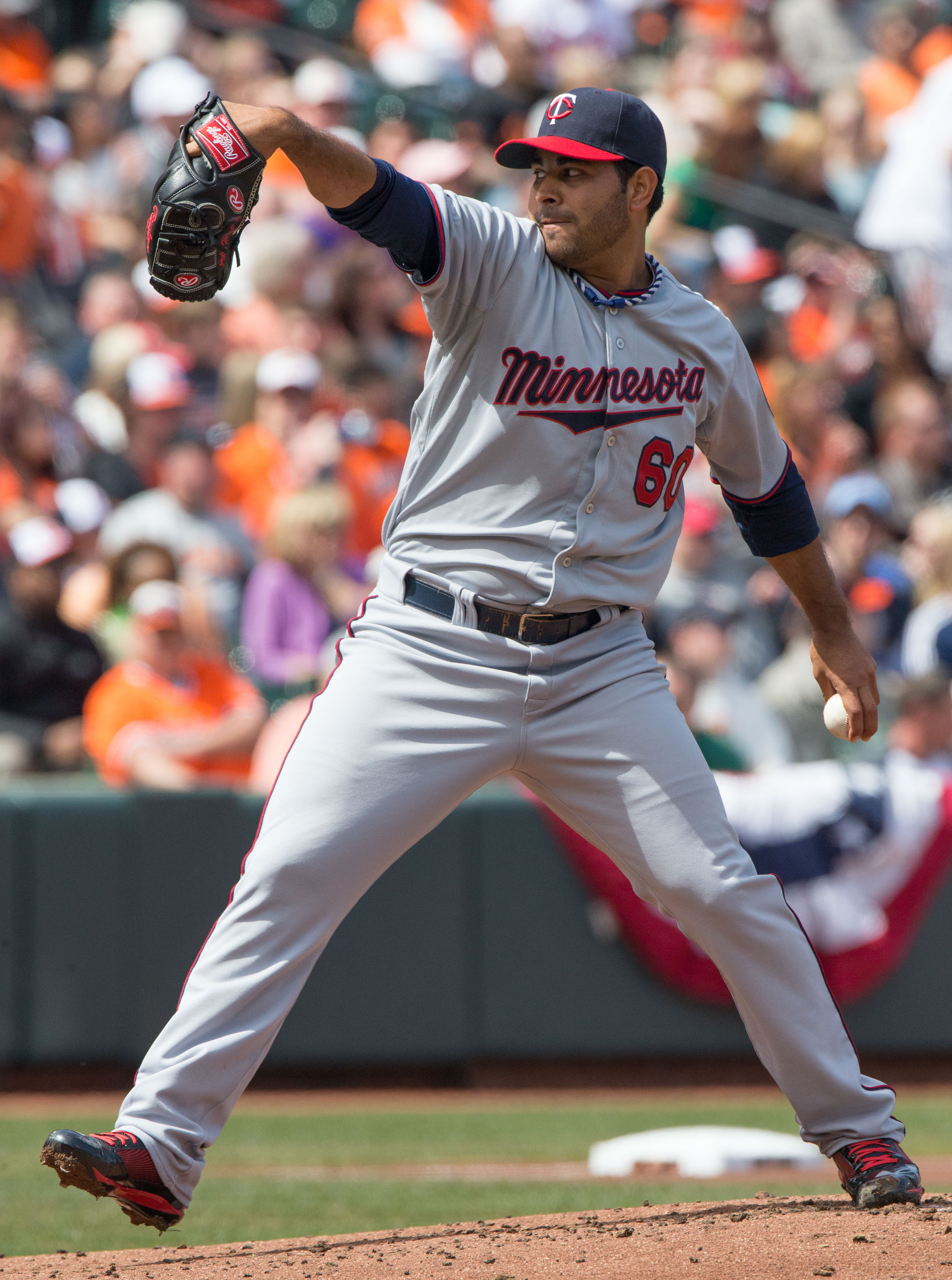
- Hernández with the Minnesota Twins
- Pitcher
- Born: April 12, 1989 (age 37); Barquisimeto, Venezuela
- Batted: Left Threw: Left

MLB debut
- July 18, 2012, for the Chicago White Sox

Last MLB appearance
- July 31, 2014, for the Colorado Rockies

MLB statistics
- Win–loss record: 3–4
- Earned run average: 7.57
- Strikeouts: 31
- Stats at Baseball Reference

Teams
- Chicago White Sox (2012); Minnesota Twins (2013); Colorado Rockies (2014)

Pedro Michel Hernández (born April 12, 1989) is a Venezuelan former professional baseball pitcher. He played in Major League Baseball (MLB) with the Chicago White Sox, Minnesota Twins, and Colorado Rockies.

== Professional career ==
=== San Diego Padres ===
Hernández signed with the San Diego Padres as an international free agent in 2009, after he graduated from the Padres baseball academy in the Dominican Republic. After the 2011 season, the Padres added Hernández to their 40 man roster to protect him from the Rule 5 draft. Later in the 2011-12 offseason, the Padres traded Hernández and Simón Castro to the White Sox for Carlos Quentin.

=== Chicago White Sox ===
On July 18, 2012, Hernández made his major league debut against the Boston Red Sox. Hernández started the game against Felix Doubront. He was tagged for a three-run home run by Cody Ross in the bottom of the third inning and the bottom of the 4th inning, and was relieved by Hector Santiago in the bottom of the 5th inning, picking up the loss.

=== Minnesota Twins ===
On July 28, 2012, Hernández was traded to the Minnesota Twins with Eduardo Escobar in exchange for Francisco Liriano. He spent the remainder of the year with the Triple-A Rochester Red Wings, accumulating an 0-2 record and 5.19 ERA with 11 strikeouts across four starts.

Hernández made 14 appearances (including 12 starts) for Minnesota during the 2013 campaign, compiling a 3-3 record and 6.83 ERA with 29 strikeouts across 56 2/3 innings pitched. He was removed from the 40-man roster and sent outright to Rochester on October 25, 2013.

=== Colorado Rockies ===
On November 15, 2013, Hernández signed a minor league contract with the Colorado Rockies. On July 31, 2014, the Rockies selected Hernández's contract, adding him to their active roster. He started Colorado's matchup that day against the Chicago Cubs, taking the loss after allowing three runs on six hits with two strikeouts across 5 2/3 innings. Hernández was designated for assignment by the Rockies on August 2. He cleared waivers and was sent outright to the Triple-A Colorado Springs Sky Sox on August 4.

=== St. Paul Saints ===
Hernández signed with the St. Paul Saints of the American Association of Independent Professional Baseball for the 2015 season. In 16 starts for St. Paul, he accumulated an 8-3 record and 3.99 ERA with 63 strikeouts over 97 innings of work. Hernández became a free agent at the end of the season.

=== Rieleros de Aguascalientes ===
On February 26, 2016, Hernández signed with the Rieleros de Aguascalientes of the Mexican League. Hernández made six starts for Aguascalientes, compiling an 0-2 record and 4.38 ERA with 21 strikeouts over 37 innings of work.

=== Tigres de Quintana Roo ===
On May 26, 2016, Hernández was traded to the Tigres de Quintana Roo of the Mexican League. He started six contests for Quintana Roo, registering a 1-0 record and 2.35 ERA with 21 strikeouts across 30 2/3 innings pitched. Hernández was released by the Tigres on June 30.

=== Texas AirHogs ===
On February 9, 2018, Hernández signed with the Sussex County Miners of the Can-Am League. On April 15, he was traded to the Texas AirHogs of the American Association. Hernández would make only four appearances for Texas, struggling to an 0-1 record and 13.50 ERA with five strikeouts and one save over four innings pitched. He was released by the AirHogs on November 12.

== See also ==
- List of Major League Baseball players from Venezuela
