= Ray Olmedo =

Venezuelan baseball player & coach (born 1981)

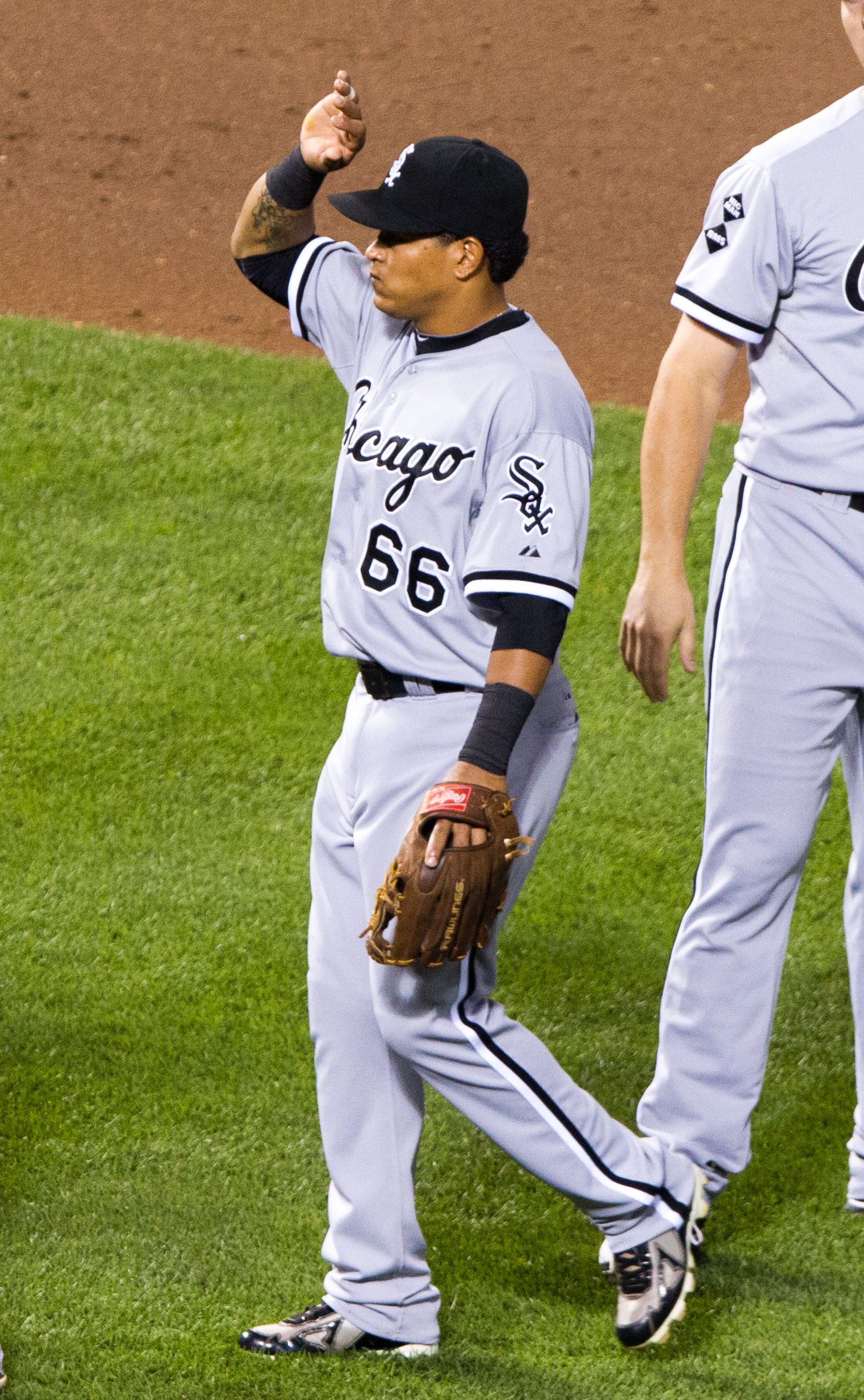
- Olmedo with the Chicago White Sox

Algodoneros de Unión Laguna – No. 4
- Infielder
- Born: May 31, 1981 (age 45); Maracay, Aragua State, Venezuela
- Batted: Switch Threw: Right

MLB debut
- May 25, 2003, for the Cincinnati Reds

Last MLB appearance
- October 3, 2012, for the Chicago White Sox

MLB statistics
- Batting average: .230
- Home runs: 2
- Runs batted in: 27
- Stats at Baseball Reference

Teams
- Cincinnati Reds (2003–2006); Toronto Blue Jays (2007); Chicago White Sox (2012)

Rainer Gustavo Olmedo (born May 31, 1981) is a Venezuelan former professional baseball infielder who currently serves as the third base coach for the Algodoneros de Unión Laguna of the Mexican League. He played in Major League Baseball (MLB) for the Cincinnati Reds, Toronto Blue Jays, and Chicago White Sox. He was a switch-hitter who threw right-handed.

== Career ==
=== Cincinnati Reds ===
Olmedo was originally signed by the Cincinnati Reds as an undrafted free agent on January 21, 1999. He made his Major League debut on May 25, 2003, against the Florida Marlins, striking out as a pinch hitter. He made his first start the next day, against the Atlanta Braves and was hitless in 4 at-bats with 2 strikeouts. He recorded his first Major League hit when he went 3 for 4 against the Marlins on June 1. In parts of 4 seasons with the Reds, he appeared in 171 games and hit .228. He hit 2 home runs with the Reds, the first was on September 23, 2005, against Aquilino López of the Philadelphia Phillies and the second was on September 18, 2006, against Roy Oswalt of the Houston Astros.

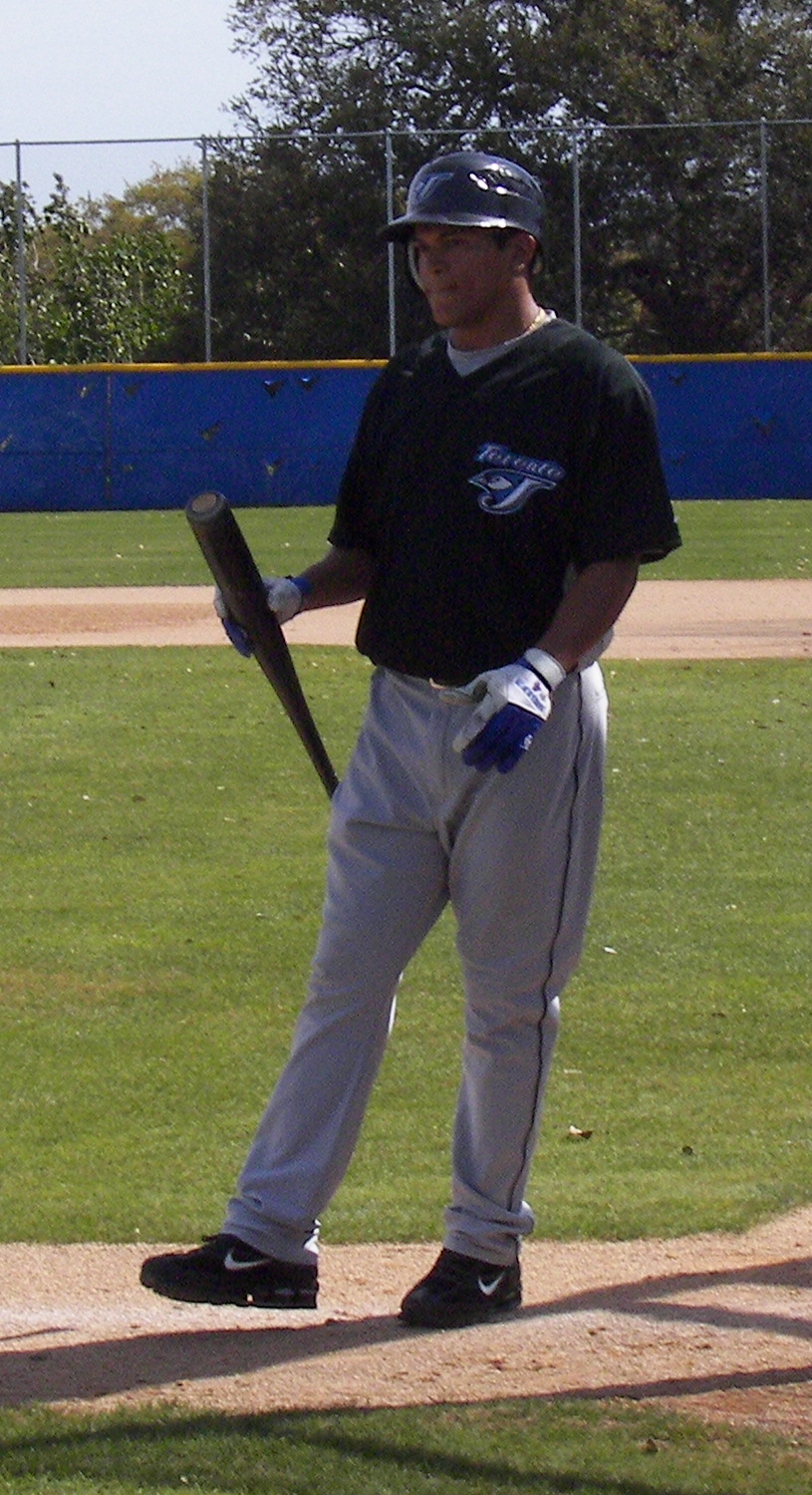
Olmedo with the Toronto Blue Jays in 2007 spring training

=== Toronto Blue Jays ===
He was selected off waivers by the Toronto Blue Jays on January 19, 2007. He appeared in 27 games for the Blue Jays, hitting only .216.

=== Pittsburgh Pirates/Philadelphia Phillies ===
On February 1, 2008, Olmedo was claimed off waivers from the Toronto Blue Jays by the Pittsburgh Pirates.

On February 26, 2008, Olmedo was claimed off waivers by the Philadelphia Phillies. On March 28, he was sent outright to the minors, but declined the assignment and became a free agent.

=== Washington Nationals ===
Olmedo signed a minor league contract with the Washington Nationals on March 29, 2008. He played in 108 games with the AAA Columbus Clippers, hitting .252.

=== Tampa Bay Rays ===
He became a free agent at the end of the season and signed a minor league contract with the Tampa Bay Rays in December. In 115 games with the Durham Bulls, he hit .250.

=== Milwaukee Brewers ===
On December 16, 2009, Olmedo signed a minor league contract with the Texas Rangers.

On March 22, 2010, Olmedo was traded to the Milwaukee Brewers in exchange for catcher Matt Treanor. He hit .284 in 114 games for the Triple-A Nashville Sounds. Olmedo elected free agency after the 2010 season.

=== Tampa Bay Rays (second stint) ===
On January 7, 2011, Olmedo signed a minor league contract with the Tampa Bay Rays. With the Triple-A Durham Bulls, he hit .260 in 124 games.

=== Chicago White Sox ===
After the season, he became a free agent and on December 1, 2011, he signed a minor league contract with the Chicago White Sox. On July 29, 2012, he was called up from the Triple-A Charlotte Knights. On October 10, Olmedo was removed from the 40-man roster and sent outright to Charlotte, and subsequently elected free agency.

=== Tampa Bay Rays (third stint) ===
On January 6, 2014, Olmedo signed a minor league contract to return to the Tampa Bay Rays organization. In 104 games for the Triple–A Durham Bulls, he batted .224/.281/.271 with no home runs, 25 RBI, and 9 stolen bases. Olmedo became a free agent following the season.

=== Rimini Baseball Club ===
On January 25, 2015, Olmedo signed with the Rimini Baseball Club of the Italian Baseball League (IBL). In 28 games for Rimini, he hit .285/.363/.363 with 1 home run, 13 RBI, and 4 stolen bases.

=== Nettuno Baseball Club ===
On March 3, 2016, Olmedo signed with the Nettuno Baseball Club of the Italian Baseball League (IBL).

== See also ==
- List of Major League Baseball players from Venezuela
