= Damaso Espino =

Panamanian baseball player (born 1983)

Dámaso Espino
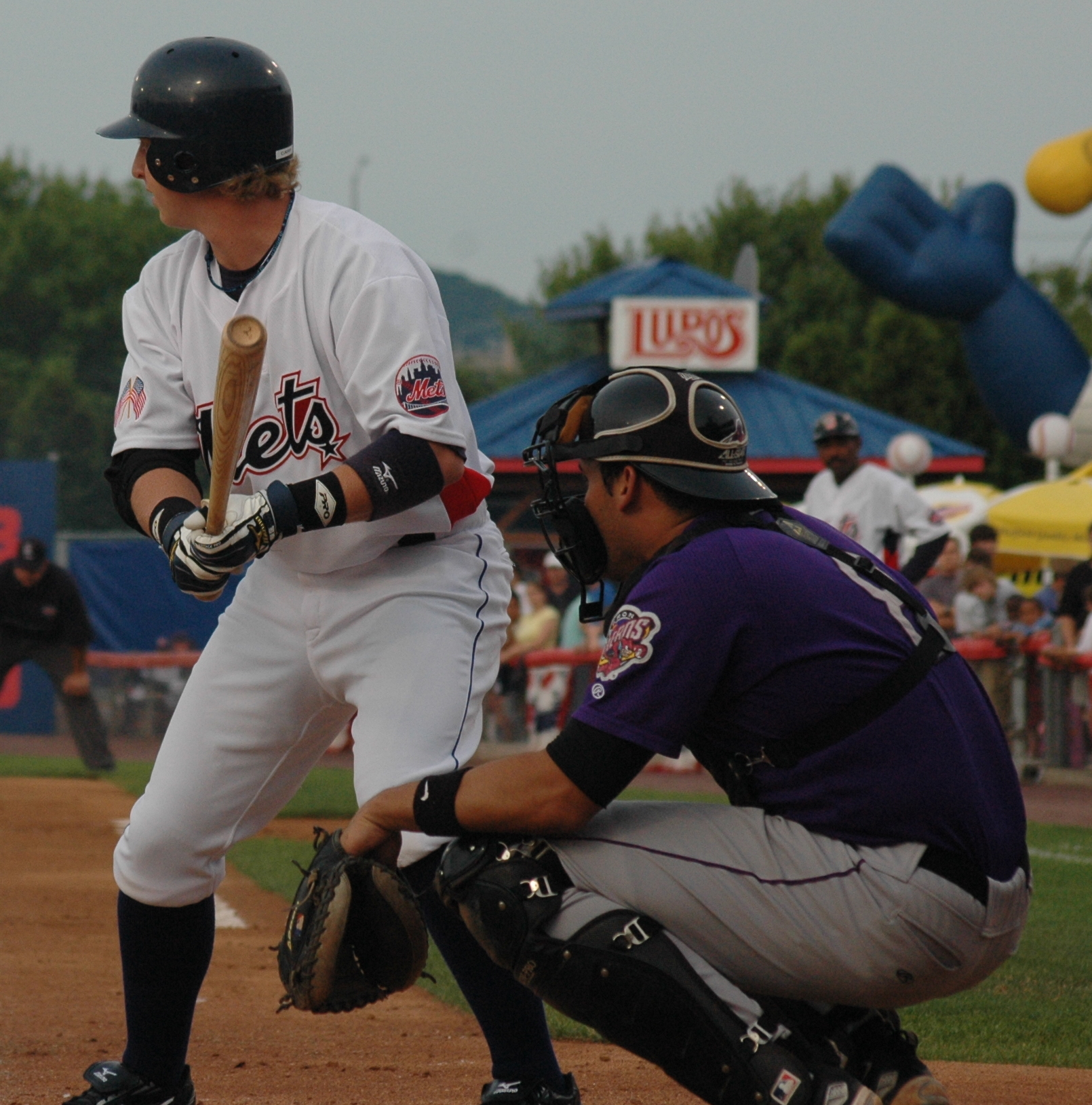
- Espino (right) catching for the Akron Aeros in 2008
- Catcher
- Born: May 8, 1983 (age 42); Los Santos, Panama
- Bats: Right Throws: Right
- Stats at Baseball Reference

Dámaso Matias Espino (born May 8, 1983 in Los Santos, Panama), is a Panamanian former professional baseball catcher. He was selected for the Panama national baseball team for the World Baseball Classic in 2006, 2009, and 2013.

== Professional career ==
=== Cincinnati Reds ===
Espino was originally signed by the Cincinnati Reds as an undrafted free agent infielder in 1999. He played for the Gulf Coast Reds from 2000 to 2002, earning Gulf Coast League All-Star honors in 2002 as a third baseman when he hit .332 in 58 games.

=== Kansas City Royals ===
He was traded by the Reds on March 6, 2003 to the Kansas City Royals. The Royals assigned hin to the Class-A Burlington Bees for 2003 and promoted him to the Wilmington Blue Rocks in 2004. In 2005, he returned to Burlington and made the transition to playing catcher. He spent 2006–2007 in AA with the Wichita Wranglers and made it to AAA in 2008 with the Omaha Royals.

=== Cleveland Indians ===
Espino was traded by the Royals to the Cleveland Indians on June 12, 2008 for cash. Espino was invited to Spring Training for the 2010 season but did not make the club and was assigned to the Triple-A Columbus Clippers. He remained with the Indians through 2010, playing for the AA Akron Aeros and Columbus.

=== Los Angeles Dodgers ===
Espino signed a minor league contract with the Los Angeles Dodgers on January 26, 2011 and received an invitation to major league camp. He was assigned to the AAA Albuquerque Isotopes, where he appeared in 65 games and hit .292. On November 2, 2011, he elected free agency.

=== Chicago White Sox ===
On January 17, 2012, Espino signed a minor league contract with the Chicago White Sox. In 66 games with the AA Birmingham Barons, he hit .284. He also played in 3 games with AAA Charlotte in 2012. On November 2, 2012, he elected free agency. On December 18, 2012, Espino re-signed with the White Sox on a minor league contract and appeared in 1 game at Charlotte in 2013 before he was released.

=== Los Angeles Dodgers (second stint) ===
Espino signed a minor league contract with the Los Angeles Dodgers on June 23, 2013 and reported to AAA Albuquerque, where he appeared in 19 games and batted .333. On November 4, 2013, he elected free agency.

=== Somerset Patriots ===
On April 1, 2014, Espino signed with the Somerset Patriots of the Atlantic League of Professional Baseball. In 2014, Espino slashed .252/.274/.298 with 1 home run and 18 RBI in 70 games.

== Post-baseball career ==
On January 19, 2015, Espino retired from professional baseball and joined the St. Louis Cardinals organization as an international scout. He is currently a Panama-based scout and international crosschecker, and was involved in the signing of Cardinals catching prospect Iván Herrera.

== Personal ==
Espino's cousin Paolo played six seasons in Major League Baseball. Espino played in the World Baseball Classic for Panama in both 2006 and 2009, with a total of three at-bats in the two series. Paolo was also on Panama's roster for the World Baseball Classic.
