= Carlos Quentin =

American baseball player (born 1982)

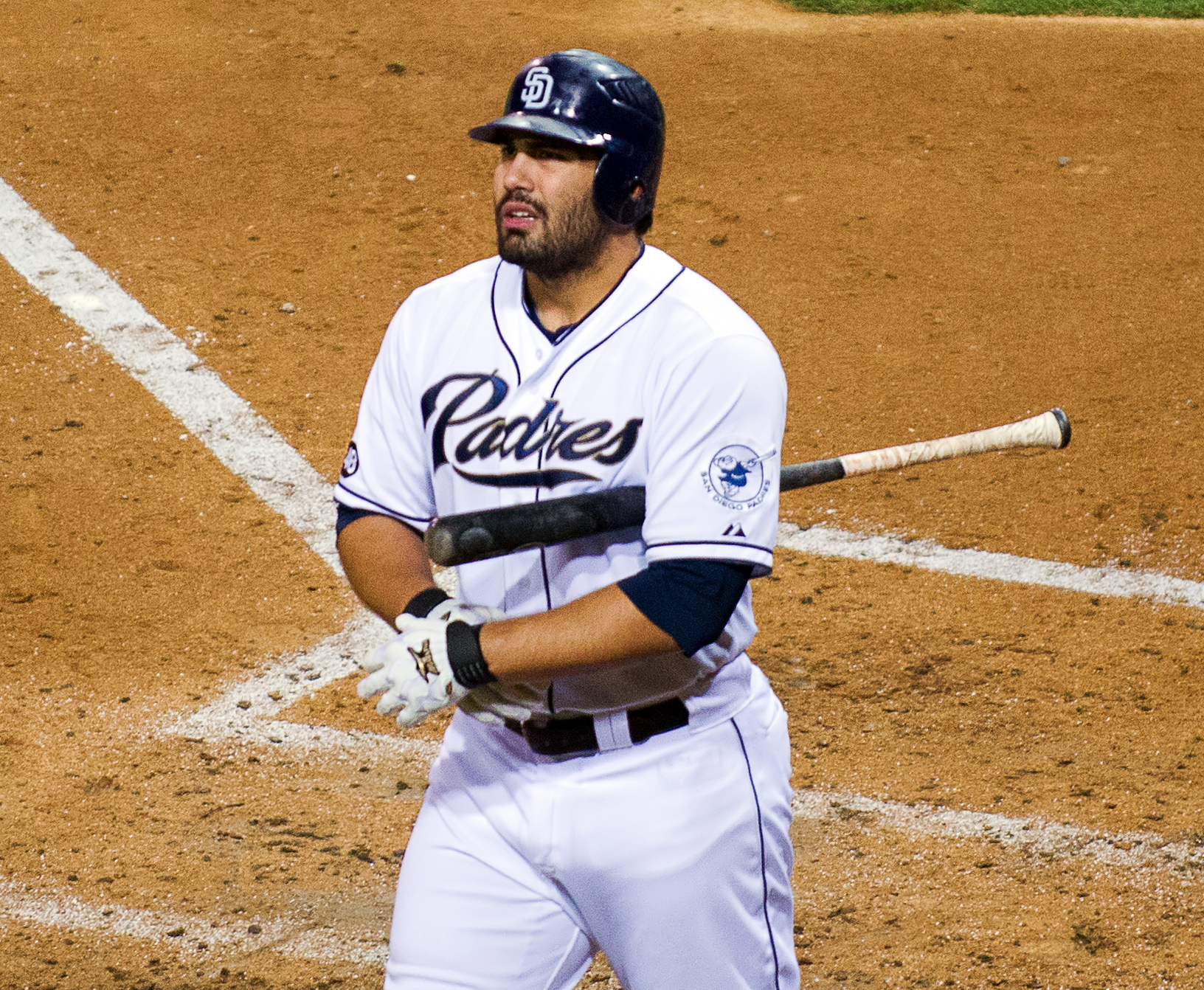
- Quentin with the Padres in 2012
- Outfielder
- Born: August 28, 1982 (age 44); Bellflower, California, U.S.
- Batted: Right Threw: Right

MLB debut
- July 20, 2006, for the Arizona Diamondbacks

Last MLB appearance
- July 26, 2014, for the San Diego Padres

MLB statistics
- Batting average: .252
- Home runs: 154
- Runs batted in: 491
- Stats at Baseball Reference

Teams
- Arizona Diamondbacks (2006–2007); Chicago White Sox (2008–2011); San Diego Padres (2012–2014)

Career highlights and awards
- 2× All-Star (2008, 2011); Silver Slugger Award (2008)
Medals
Men's baseball
Representing United States
World Junior Baseball Championship
Gold medal – first place	1999 Kaohsiung	Team

Carlos José Quentin (born August 28, 1982) is an American former professional baseball outfielder. He played in Major League Baseball (MLB) for the Arizona Diamondbacks, Chicago White Sox and San Diego Padres. In 2008 and 2011, Quentin was selected as an All-Star.

== Early life ==
Quentin attended Saint Pius X Elementary School (Chula Vista, California). At University of San Diego High School, he was a three-sport athlete, playing baseball, football, and basketball. He led his baseball team to two Western League Championships, while setting a record at the school with 28 home runs and 119 RBIs. In football his senior year, he was selected First Team All-County, All-CIF, and All-Western League, and was named Western League Defensive Player of the Year as an outside linebacker. He also captured two league and two section titles. In addition, he participated on the 1997 high school state championship team in basketball. He was named the San Diego Male Athlete of the Year in 2000. Aside from sports, he was on his school honor roll. He lost the USDHS Senior Year Best Athlete award to his high school classmate Mark Pfizenmayer.

== College career ==
Quentin attended Stanford University, where he was named All Pac-10 the three seasons he played (freshman, sophomore and junior). He was honored by Baseball America magazine all three seasons as well. He was named Pac-10 Freshman of the Year in 2001. In his junior season (2003), he was named Third Team All-American by the NCBWA and was one of five finalists for the Golden Spikes Award. He played alongside future major leaguers Oakland Athletics outfielder Sam Fuld and Oakland Athletics middle infielder Jed Lowrie. In a game against the Florida State Seminoles baseball team on February 9, 2002, Quentin was hit by a pitch five times, a then-college baseball record before Sacramento State's Matt Masciangelo was hit by a pitch seven times in one game in 2024.

Quentin helped lead the Cardinal to postseason appearances all three years of his collegiate career, culminating in a 2-for-2, 2-RBI performance in Stanford's 2003 College World Series Championship Series Game 3 loss to Rice University. He finished his Stanford career with a .350 batting average, 35 home runs, 170 RBIs, and 26 stolen bases in 199 games played for the Cardinal.

== Professional career ==
=== Minor leagues ===
Quentin was drafted by the Arizona Diamondbacks in the first round (29th overall) of the 2003 Major League Baseball draft. He sat out that year after undergoing Tommy John surgery on his right elbow (a rare procedure for non-pitchers). Once recovered, he quickly became part of a talented core of young Diamondbacks prospects.

Quentin set a minor-league record in 2004 when he was hit by a pitch 43 times. That season, he led all Arizona minor league players in batting (.332), RBIs (91), runs (103), hits (157), and walks (69), numbers that were divided between Single-A Lancaster and Double-A El Paso. He also starred on a TV show chronicling the life of a minor leaguer with Chris Young and Dustin Nippert.

=== Arizona Diamondbacks ===
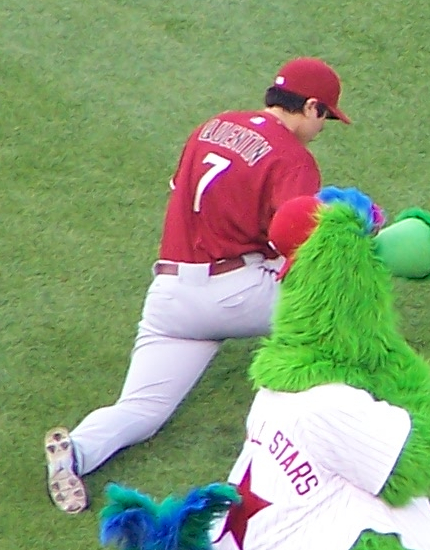
Quentin in 2007 on the field with the Phillie Phanatic

==== 2006 ====
Quentin was hitting .290 with 30 doubles, three triples, nine homers and 52 RBI in 85 games for the Tucson Sidewinders when he was called up to the Diamondbacks on July 20, 2006. After grounding out in his first two major league at bats, Quentin hit a two-run home run off Mark Hendrickson in the sixth inning of Arizona's 5–2 win over the Los Angeles Dodgers. His arrival was long anticipated by Diamondbacks fans; he was expected to replace Shawn Green as the everyday right fielder for the Diamondbacks once Green retired or otherwise left the team. Green was traded to the New York Mets in August, clearing the way for Quentin to become a full-time starter. Quentin would finish the 2006 season with a .253 batting average, nine home runs, and 32 RBI in 57 games for the Diamondbacks.

==== 2007 ====
Quentin began the 2007 season on the disabled list when he was diagnosed with a partial tear of his left labrum during Spring Training. He made his season debut on April 16 against the Dodgers and finished 2-for-4 with two doubles. After producing disappointing results through the first half of the season (.210, five home runs, 28 RBI in 66 games), Quentin was demoted to Triple-A on July 6.

=== Chicago White Sox ===
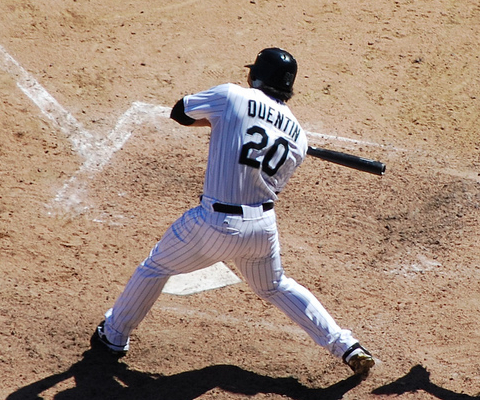
Quentin batting for the White Sox in 2008

On December 3, 2007, Quentin was traded to the Chicago White Sox for minor league first baseman Chris Carter. Carter played for the Single-A Kannapolis Intimidators in 2007, and was considered one of the White Sox' best prospects.

==== 2008 ====
In 2008, Quentin was a huge surprise for the White Sox, emerging to become one of the team's best hitters. Through August 18, he was ranking among American League leaders in home runs (first, 35), slugging percentage (third, .586), OPS (third, .981), and runs batted in (third, 96). Quentin's strong season drew calls for a possible AL MVP award. Prior to a game against the Seattle Mariners on August 18, White Sox catcher A. J. Pierzynski said, "As far as I'm concerned, Quentin has been the American League MVP." In the game, Quentin hit his 35th home run of the season in a 13–5 rout of the Mariners.

In August 2008, Quentin set a Major League record by being hit by a pitch in six consecutive games. As of 2025, no other player has been hit by a pitch in more than five straight games.

Due to Jim Thome's slow start, manager Ozzie Guillén promoted the red-hot Quentin up the batting order into Thome's customary third spot for Chicago's game on May 14 against the Angels in Anaheim. Quentin delivered a key eighth-inning grand slam, breaking a 1–1 tie, and kicked off a run that saw the White Sox win 10 of 12 games and charge to first place. He stayed in the third spot in the order thereafter. During a nationally televised home game on May 25, Quentin clocked two home runs off of the Angels' John Lackey and drove in all of the White Sox runs in a 3–2 walk-off victory. His towering home runs drew comparisons to sluggers such as José Canseco and Luis Gonzalez. Angels center fielder Torii Hunter characterized his pure power as "tremendous pop, like Hulk Hogan. He's crazy strong."

Quentin injured his wrist after slamming his bat with his wrist in frustration after fouling off a pitch in Cleveland. On September 5, 2008, it was reported that Quentin had a fractured wrist and would undergo surgery, missing the rest of the season.

Quentin finished the year with a .288 average, 36 home runs, 100 RBI, and a .394 on-base percentage in 130 games. Defensively, in 2008 he had the lowest fielding percentage of all starting AL left fielders, .971. Even though he missed the last month of the season, Quentin was awarded his first Silver Slugger Award.

Quentin finished fifth in the balloting for AL MVP, behind Dustin Pedroia, Justin Morneau, Kevin Youkilis, and Joe Mauer.

==== 2009 ====
Quentin played well at the start of the 2009 season but he hit a slump after suffering from plantar fasciitis which hampered his swing. He was forced to miss several games in May as a result of the injury and was eventually placed on the 15-day disabled list at the end of the month. He was activated again on July 20 after a minor league rehabilitation assignment, and was able to remain with the big league club through the remainder of the year. In 99 games on the season, Quentin hit .236 with 21 home runs, 56 RBI and a .779 on-base plus slugging percentage.

In 2009, he was named #40 on the Sporting News' list of the 50 greatest current players in baseball. A panel of 100 baseball people, many of them members of the Baseball Hall of Fame and winners of major baseball awards, was polled to arrive at the list.

==== 2010 ====
Quentin moved from left field to right field for 2010 as the White Sox acquired Juan Pierre to play left and right fielder Jermaine Dye became a free agent. Quentin was mired in a batting slump for a good portion of the first half of the season. On June 13, he was hitting .201 with eight home runs through 55 games. He began turning things around with a late-June hot streak which coincided with a White Sox 11-game win streak, hitting four homers and raising his OPS from .681 to .781. In early July, Quentin had a two-home run game against the Los Angeles Angels followed shortly by back-to-back two-homer games on July 10 and 11 against the Kansas City Royals, including a grand slam in the second game. Quentin entered the 2010 All-Star break batting .244 with a .867 OPS, 19 home runs and 61 RBI, placing him among the American League leaders in both home runs and RBIs. He finished the season hitting .243 with 26 homers and 87 RBI in 131 games.

==== 2011 ====
Quentin was selected to his second All-Star Game as a reserve after posting an .852 OPS in the first half.

Quentin sprained his left shoulder making a diving catch on August 20 and only made two more plate appearances in 2011. Quentin finished the season batting .254 with 24 home runs and 77 RBI. He drew 34 walks, posted a .499 slugging percentage, and had a career-high 31 doubles through 118 games.

In 2011, Quentin led the Major Leagues in being hit by pitch, with 23.

=== San Diego Padres ===
On December 31, 2011, Quentin was traded from the White Sox to his home town San Diego Padres for Simón Castro and Pedro Hernández.

==== 2012 ====
Quentin opened the 2012 season on the disabled list after undergoing arthroscopic surgery on his right knee to repair a torn meniscus in March. He made his Padres debut on May 28, regularly batting in the clean-up position and playing left field or acting as DH in interleague games.

On July 22, 2012, Quentin agreed to a three-year, $27 million contract extension through 2015 with a $10 million mutual option for 2016, including a no-trade clause. "This is an amazing opportunity to stay and play in the city I grew up in." said Quentin.

Quentin's right knee began to bother him in September, and he only played in the field once after September 10. He had another arthroscopic surgery on the right knee after the season ended. Quentin played in a total of 86 games and finished the season batting .261/.374/.504 with 16 home runs and 46 RBI in 284 at-bats. Despite playing only half a season, he once again led the league in being hit by pitch, setting a Padres season record with 17.

==== 2013 ====
Quentin was still recovering from his knee surgery as the 2013 season began, and he was limited to four games and 14 at-bats in spring training. The Padres limited his play in the field early to rest the knee.

On April 11 in a game against the Los Angeles Dodgers, Quentin was hit in the shoulder by a pitch thrown by Zack Greinke. Quentin charged the mound, igniting a bench-clearing brawl in which Greinke's collarbone was fractured. Quentin was suspended for eight games for his role in the incident.

Quentin left a July 30 game early after tweaking his right knee on a swing. The game ended up being Quentin's final game of the 2013 season, as he was placed on the disabled list on August 10 and later decided to have surgery to clean up the knee to be ready for 2014. He had the surgery on September 3 and was encouraged by the results, calling it "the best of the three".

For the season, Quentin batted .275 with 13 home runs, 44 RBI and an .855 OPS in 82 games.

==== 2014 ====
Quentin began the season on the disabled list as he recovered from knee surgery from the previous season, and was activated on May 13. Upon return, Quentin struggled mightily offensively, hitting just .177 through 50 games. He was placed on the disabled list on July 26 due to a sore knee. The injury ended his season and his three-year tenure with the Padres.

=== Atlanta Braves ===
On April 5, 2015, Quentin was traded to the Atlanta Braves along with Cameron Maybin, Matt Wisler, and Jordan Paroubeck, for Craig Kimbrel and Melvin Upton Jr. The Braves designated him for assignment later that day, and released him on April 14.

=== Seattle Mariners ===
Quentin signed a minor league deal with the Seattle Mariners on April 22, 2015, and was assigned to the Tacoma Rainiers. On May 1, 2015, Quentin announced his retirement.

=== Minnesota Twins ===
On February 2, 2016, Quentin came out of retirement and signed a minor league contract with the Minnesota Twins. On March 28, he asked for his release from the Twins after refusing an assignment to their minor league camp.

=== Pericos de Puebla ===
On July 12, 2016, Quentin came out of retirement to join the Mexican League and signed with the top team in the league, the Pericos de Puebla, playing under manager Cory Snyder. In 21 games he struggled hitting .211/.305/.465 with 5 home runs and 14 RBIs.

=== Boston Red Sox ===
On February 8, 2017, Quentin signed a Minor League deal with the Boston Red Sox. He was released at the end of Spring Training.

=== Acereros de Monclova ===
On July 11, 2017, Quentin signed with the Acereros de Monclova of the Mexican Baseball League. He became a free agent following the 2017 season. In 13 games he struggled hitting .212/.350/.424 with 2 home runs and 15 RBIs.

== Personal life ==
Quentin is married to Jeane Goff, an All-American track and field athlete from Stanford University. His wife gave birth to their first son, Clarke, in 2013.
