= 2012 Cleveland Indians season =

2012 Cleveland Indians
- League: American League
- Division: Central
- Ballpark: Progressive Field
- City: Cleveland, Ohio
- Record: 68–94 (.420)
- Divisional place: 4th
- Owners: Larry Dolan
- General managers: Chris Antonetti
- Managers: Manny Acta; Sandy Alomar Jr.
- Television: SportsTime Ohio · WKYC (Matt Underwood, Rick Manning)
- Radio: WTAM · WMMS; Cleveland Indians Radio Network (Tom Hamilton, Jim Rosenhaus)

The 2012 Cleveland Indians season was the 112th season for the franchise. The team attempted (but failed) to improve on its 2011 campaign in which was 80–82 and finished second in the American League Central. The team was also looking to return to the playoffs for the first time since 2007. The team played all of its home games at Progressive Field, which will be in its 19th season.

The Indians were in playoff contention for much of the first four months of the season. The team had a record of 44–41 at the All Star Break, and were just a few games back in both the AL Central and Wild Card races. However, the team struggled through the second half, going just 24–53 after the break, for a final record of 68–94, placing 4th in the division.

This marked the third and final season under the leadership of manager Manny Acta. Acta was fired on September 27 with six games remaining. Bench coach and former Indians' catcher Sandy Alomar Jr. was named the interim manager for the team's final six games.

== Spring training ==
The Indians had a 7–22 win–loss record in spring training, their .241 winning percentage being the worst among all MLB teams during pre-season. Three of their games finished tied and were therefore not included in the standings.

== Regular season ==
=== Opening Day lineup ===
1. Michael Brantley – CF
2. Asdrúbal Cabrera – SS
3. Shin-Soo Choo – RF
4. Carlos Santana – C
5. Travis Hafner – DH
6. Shelley Duncan – LF
7. Casey Kotchman – 1B
8. Jason Kipnis – 2B
9. Jack Hannahan – 3B

Justin Masterson – SP

=== April ===
For the fourth straight season, the Indians would lose the season opener, in record fashion. The Indians played host to the Toronto Blue Jays and had a 4–1 lead before allowing the Blue Jays to even the score in the ninth inning. The game would last 16 innings before the Indians fell 7–4 in what would be the longest season-opener in Major League history, besting the previous record of 15 innings (done in 1926 and 1960). The next day when the clubs had finished their second meeting, a 7–4 win for Toronto in 12 innings, it was the first time since 1969 that two games to open the season had gone 12 innings or more.

On the road against Seattle, the Indians had their largest comeback win since May 25, 2009 when they rallied from a 7-run deficit before eventually winning 11–10. The Indians won two of three against the Oakland Athletics and thus for the first time since 1988 won their first three road series on the year.

After a 13–7 win over the Kansas City Royals, the Indians had for the first time in the club's 111-year history scored at least 8 runs in their first 3 road games of the season. The team failed to hit a home run in 11 straight games to end April, the franchise's longest homer-less streak since the 1983 season when they went 14 games.

The Indians would go 11–9 in the month, finishing with a 1/2 game lead over the Detroit Tigers in the AL Central. The team was 7–2 on the road.

=== May ===
The Indians started May with a stretch of 21 games in 20 days. The Indians went 13–8 in this stretch. The Tribe started the month on the road and when they won the third game of a three-game series with the Chicago White Sox, it was their fourth road series win in a row to start the season, which was last done by the 1961 Indians (although the 1961 club opened the season with a one-game "series" at Detroit). They would lose their next road series to stop the streak, losing to the Boston Red Sox in three of four games. The club would have their first day off of the month on the 21st, and continued their good play with a home sweep over Detroit that would give the Indians a 3 1/2-game lead over second place Chicago and a 6-game lead over Detroit. However, this lead was short-lived as the Indians were immediately swept by Chicago in a three-game road series en route to ending May with losses in five of their last six games. Injuries contributed to this poor performance, as shortstop Asdrúbal Cabrera (hamstring), designated hitter Travis Hafner (knee), and catcher Carlos Santana (concussion) all suffered injuries late in the month. Despite being in first place during most of May, the attendance at Progressive Field was last in the majors.

=== June ===
The team started June at a 6-9 clip. The poor start was highlighted by a sweep at the hands of the Cincinnati Reds in Cincinnati June 12–14. However, the Tribe would return the favor and sweep their in-state rivals at home, earning a split in the year's Ohio Cup. The rest of interleague play did not fare well as the Indians went 8–10 against the Senior Circuit. Near the end of the month, the Indians lost five straight games including being swept by the New York Yankees. The Indians ended the month recording a season-high 19 hits in an 11–5 road win over the Baltimore Orioles to keep them from going below the .500 mark. The Indians went 12–15 in June and entered July with an overall record of 39–38, good for second in the Central, 2 1/2 games behind Chicago. Asdrúbal Cabrera led the team with 6 HR and 18 RBI in the month, while right fielder Shin-Soo Choo recorded a team-high 34 hits. Also during the month, center fielder Michael Brantley had a 22-game hitting streak, the longest in the MLB to that point in the season.

=== July ===
Shortstop Asdrúbal Cabrera and closer Chris Perez were named to the American League All Star Team on July 1. Cabrera participated in the game as a reserve infielder. Perez did not pitch in the game.

The Indians as a team struggled offensively for much of July, as the team scored three or fewer runs eight times in the first 13 games of the month. Cabrera and catcher Carlos Santana had the greatest slumps. Between July 1 and 22, Cabrera's average fell 28 points, from .300 to .272. Between May 15 and July 17, Santana was hitting .168 with no home runs. After a July 17 loss to the Tampa Bay Rays, the team batting average with the bases loaded fell to .193, the third lowest in the AL. Second basemen Jason Kipnis, who had 46 RBIs heading into July, recorded 9 for the entire month while designated hitter Travis Hafner had 6.

However, the Indians' pitching staff, specifically the back end of the bullpen kept them in most games. The club has been able to rely on Perez and set-up man Vinnie Pestano to hold the lead in close games. To the July 17-point in the season, Cleveland held a 27–3 record in games which both Perez and Pestano saw action. The Indians' woes continued in the latter half of the month, however, and ended July on a four-game losing streak, including losses to the Twins and Royals, both below them in the Central standings. The Indians' record fell three games under .500 for the first time since April 11. Starting pitcher Josh Tomlin, who went 2–5 with a 7.02 ERA in his last eight outings, was moved to the bullpen at the end of the month to take on relief pitching duties.

=== August ===
The Indians ended a nine-game road trip with a loss on August 5, failing to win during a road trip of 9 games or more for the first time in franchise history. The losing streak continued for two more home games and ended with a 6–2 win over the Minnesota Twins on August 8. The 11 straight losses was one short of a franchise record. After the Indians lost a ninth-straight game on August 24, it marked the first time in franchise history two losing streaks of nine games or more had occurred within the same season. Following a 5–3 loss to the Texas Rangers on August 31, the Indians finished the month at 5-24, tying a franchise record for the most losses in a month, originally set in July 1914.

=== September/October ===
After a disastrous August, the Indians had a decent start to September, beginning the month 3–2 against eventual playoff teams Texas and Detroit. The Indians' struggles would continue, however. On September 27 the team fired manager Manny Acta and promoted bench coach Sandy Alomar Jr. to interim manager for the team's final six games. Alomar, who was in contention for the Indians' managerial job in 2013, but lost the job to Terry Francona, led the Indians to a 3–3 record in these games.

The Indians wrapped up the season on October 3 with a shutout 9–0 loss at the hands of the visiting Chicago White Sox. The Indians finished 68–94, which was 4th place in the American League Central Division.

== Season standings ==
=== American League Central ===
AL Central
Team	W	L	Pct.	GB	Home	Road
Detroit Tigers	88	74	.543	—	50‍–‍31	38‍–‍43
Chicago White Sox	85	77	.525	3	45‍–‍36	40‍–‍41
Kansas City Royals	72	90	.444	16	37‍–‍44	35‍–‍46
Cleveland Indians	68	94	.420	20	37‍–‍44	31‍–‍50
Minnesota Twins	66	96	.407	22	31‍–‍50	35‍–‍46

=== American League Wild Card ===
Division winners
Team	W	L	Pct.
New York Yankees	95	67	.586
Oakland Athletics	94	68	.580
Detroit Tigers	88	74	.543

Wild Card teams (Top 2 teams qualify for postseason)
Team	W	L	Pct.	GB
Texas Rangers	93	69	.574	—
Baltimore Orioles	93	69	.574	—
Tampa Bay Rays	90	72	.556	3
Los Angeles Angels of Anaheim	89	73	.549	4
Chicago White Sox	85	77	.525	8
Seattle Mariners	75	87	.463	18
Toronto Blue Jays	73	89	.451	20
Kansas City Royals	72	90	.444	21
Boston Red Sox	69	93	.426	24
Cleveland Indians	68	94	.420	25
Minnesota Twins	66	96	.407	27

== Game log ==
Legend
	Indians win
	Indians loss
	Postponement
**Bold**	Indians team member

2012 Game Log
April: 11–9 (Home: 4–7, Road: 7–2)

#	Date	Opponent	Score	Win	Loss	Save	Attendance	Record
1	April 5	Blue Jays	7–4 (16)	Pérez (1–0)	**Asencio** (0–1)		43,190	0–1
2	April 7	Blue Jays	7–4 (12)	Janssen (1–0)	**Sipp** (0–1)		18,842	0–2
3	April 8	Blue Jays	4–3	**Lowe** (1–0)	Carreño (0–1)	**C. Perez** (1)	10,518	1–2
4	April 9	White Sox	4–2	Sale (1–0)	**Tomlin** (0–1)	Santiago (2)	9,473	1–3
--	April 10	White Sox	Postponed (rain); rescheduled May 7 (game 1)					
5	April 11	White Sox	10–6	Danks (1–1)	**Masterson** (0–1)		9,072	1–4
6	April 13	@ Royals	8–3	**Lowe** (2–0)	Hochevar (1–1)		40,230	2–4
7	April 14	@ Royals	11–9 (10)	**Asencio** (1–1)	Holland (0–1)	**C. Perez** (2)	21,788	3–4
8	April 15	@ Royals	13–7	**Jiménez** (1–0)	Mendoza (0–2)		21,182	4–4
9	April 17	@ Mariners	9–8	**R. Pérez** (1–0)	Furbush (0–1)	**C. Perez** (3)	12,461	5–4
10	April 18	@ Mariners	4–1	Vargas (2–1)	**Lowe** (2–1)	League (5)	11,343	5–5
11	April 19	@ Mariners	2–1	**Tomlin** (1–1)	League (0–1)	**C. Perez** (4)	12,942	6–5
12	April 20	@ Athletics	4–3	**Jiménez** (2–0)	Godfrey (0–3)	**C. Perez** (5)	14,340	7–5
13	April 21	@ Athletics	5–1	**Gómez** (1–0)	McCarthy (0–3)	**C. Perez** (6)	25,258	8–5
14	April 22	@ Athletics	5–1	Ross (1–0)	**Masterson** (0–2)		24,049	8–6
15	April 24	Royals	4–3	**Lowe** (3–1)	Sánchez (1-1)	**C. Perez** (7)	9,137	9–6
16	April 25	Royals	8–2	Hochevar (2–1)	**Jiménez** (2–1)		10,552	9–7
17	April 26	Royals	4–2	Mendoza (1–2)	**Tomlin** (1–2)	Broxton (2)	9,229	9–8
18	April 27	Angels	3–2	**Pestano** (1–0)	Carpenter (0–1)		12,597	10–8
19	April 28	Angels	2–1	Haren (1–1)	**Gómez** (1–1)	Downs (1)	11,316	10–9
20	April 29	Angels	4–0	**Lowe** (4–1)	Santana (0–5)		15,421	11–9

May: 16–14 (Home: 11–7, Road: 5–7)

#	Date	Opponent	Score	Win	Loss	Save	Attendance	Record
21	May 1	@ White Sox	7–2	Sale (3–1)	**Jiménez** (2–2)		15,212	11–10
22	May 2	@ White Sox	6–3	**Smith** (1–0)	Ohman (0–1)	**C. Perez** (8)	15,192	12–10
23	May 3	@ White Sox	7–5	**Masterson** (1–2)	Danks (2–4)	**C. Perez** (9)	17,314	13–10
24	May 4	Rangers	6–3	**Gómez** (2–1)	Lewis (3–1)	**C. Perez** (10)	16,147	14–10
25	May 5	Rangers	5–2 (11)	Ogando (1–0)	**Smith** (1–1)	Nathan (7)	21,307	14–11
26	May 6	Rangers	4–2	**Jiménez** (3–2)	Darvish (4–1)	**C. Perez** (11)	18,171	15–11
27	May 7	White Sox	8–6	**McAllister** (1–0)	Humber (1–2)	**Hagadone** (1)	9,196	16–11
28	May 7	White Sox	3–2	**Smith** (2–1)	Thornton (1–2)	**Sipp** (1)	10,483	17–11
29	May 8	White Sox	5–3 (10)	Santiago (1–1)	**C. Perez** (0–1)	Reed (2)	11,304	17–12
30	May 9	White Sox	8–1	Peavy (4–1)	**Gómez** (2–2)		11,285	17–13
31	May 10	@ Red Sox	8–3	**Lowe** (5–1)	Beckett (2–4)		37,348	18–13
32	May 11	@ Red Sox	7–5	Buchholz (4–1)	**Jiménez** (3–3)	Aceves (6)	37,438	18–14
33	May 12	@ Red Sox	4–1	Doubront (3–1)	**McAllister** (1–1)	Aceves (7)	38,048	18–15
34	May 13	@ Red Sox	12–1	Bard (3–4)	**Masterson** (1–3)		37,611	18–16
35	May 14	@ Twins	5–4	**Smith** (3–1)	Capps (0–2)	**C. Perez** (12)	32,313	19–16
36	May 15	@ Twins	5–0	**Lowe** (6–1)	Marquis (2–3)		35,732	20–16
37	May 16	Mariners	9–3	**Jiménez** (4–3)	Hernández (3–3)		12,092	21–16
38	May 17	Mariners	6–5 (11)	**Smith** (4–1)	League (0–3)		12,894	22–16
39	May 18	Marlins	3–2	Zambrano (2–2)	**Sipp** (0–2)	Bell (4)	29,378	22–17
40	May 19	Marlins	2–0	**Gómez** (3–2)	Sánchez (2–2)	**C. Perez** (13)	29,799	23–17
41	May 20	Marlins	5–3	Johnson (2–3)	**Lowe** (6–2)	Bell (5)	23,668	23–18
42	May 22	Tigers	5–3	**Jiménez** (5–3)	Porcello (3–4)	**C. Perez** (14)	15,049	24–18
43	May 23	Tigers	4–2	**Pestano** (2–0)	Coke (1–1)	**C. Perez** (15)	22,000	25–18
44	May 24	Tigers	2–1	**Masterson** (2–3)	Verlander (5–2)	**C. Perez** (16)	23,622	26–18
45	May 25	@ White Sox	9–3	Quintana (1–0)	**Gómez** (3–3)		21,371	26–19
46	May 26	@ White Sox	14–7	Peavy (6–1)	**Lowe** (6–3)		27,151	26–20
47	May 27	@ White Sox	12–6	Floyd (4–5)	**Jiménez** (5–4)		22,182	26–21
48	May 28	Royals	8–5	**Tomlin** (2–2)	Adcock (0–3)	**C. Perez** (17)	25,377	27–21
49	May 29	Royals	8–2	Smith (1–1)	**Masterson** (2–4)		14,253	27–22
50	May 30	Royals	6–3	Chen (4–5)	**Gómez** (3–4)	Broxton (11)	17,112	27–23

June: 12–15 (Home: 5–4, Away: 7–11)

#	Date	Opponent	Score	Win	Loss	Save	Attendance	Record
51	June 1	Twins	7–1	**Lowe** (7–3)	Pavano (2–5)		19,904	28–23
52	June 2	Twins	7–4	Duensing (1–2)	**Tomlin** (2–3)	Capps (11)	25,469	28–24
53	June 3	Twins	6–3	Diamond (4–1)	**Masterson** (2–5)	Capps (12)	21,238	28–25
54	June 5	@ Tigers	4–2	**Jiménez** (6–4)	Smyly (2–2)	**C. Perez** (18)	33,258	29–25
55	June 6	@ Tigers	9–6	**Gómez** (4–4)	Scherzer (5–4)	**C. Perez** (19)	31,350	30–25
56	June 7	@ Tigers	7–5	Crosby (1–1)	**Lowe** (7–4)	Valverde (10)	40,851	30–26
57	June 8	@ Cardinals	6–2	**Tomlin** (3–3)	Westbrook (4–6)		42,098	31–26
58	June 9	@ Cardinals	2–0	Lohse (6–1)	**Masterson** (2–6)	Motte (11)	41,694	31–27
59	June 10	@ Cardinals	4–1	**Pestano** (3–0)	Motte (3–3)	**C. Perez** (20)	43,400	32–27
60	June 12	@ Reds	7–1	Cueto (7–3)	**Gómez** (4–5)		24,758	32–28
61	June 13	@ Reds	5–3	Latos (5–2)	**Lowe** (7–5)	Chapman (7)	27,428	32–29
62	June 14	@ Reds	12–5	Arredondo (4–1)	**Tomlin** (3–4)		34,193	32–30
63	June 15	Pirates	2–0	**Masterson** (3–6)	McDonald (5–3)	**C. Perez** (21)	31,920	33–30
64	June 16	Pirates	9–2	Burnett (7–2)	**Jiménez** (6–5)		30,408	33–31
65	June 17	Pirates	9–5	Watson (4–0)	**Gómez** (4–6)		27,388	33–32
66	June 18	Reds	10–9	**Smith** (5–1)	LeCure (2–2)	**C. Perez** (22)	19,948	34–32
67	June 19	Reds	3–2 (10)	**Hagadone** (1–0)	Chapman (4–3)		17,213	35–32
68	June 20	Reds	8–1	**Masterson** (4–6)	Arroyo (3–5)		23,544	36–32
69	June 22	@ Astros	2–0	**Jiménez** (7–5)	Harrell (6–6)	**C. Perez** (23)	26,932	37–32
70	June 23	@ Astros	8–1	Keuchel (1–0)	**Gómez** (4–7)		34,241	37–33
71	June 24	@ Astros	7–1	Happ (6–7)	**Lowe** (7–6)		21,191	37–34
72	June 25	@ Yankees	7–1	Kuroda (7–7)	**Tomlin** (3–5)		42,290	37–35
73	June 26	@ Yankees	6–4	Hughes (8–6)	**Masterson** (4–7)	Soriano (16)	43,006	37–36
74	June 27	@ Yankees	5–4	García (2–2)	**Jiménez** (7–6)	Soriano (17)	45,099	37–37
75	June 28	@ Orioles	7–2	**McAllister** (2–1)	Chen (7–4)		17,676	38–37
76	June 29	@ Orioles	9–8	Lindstrom (1–0)	**Smith** (5–2)	Johnson (23)	24,779	38–38
77	June 30	@ Orioles	11–5	**Tomlin** (4–5)	Eveland (0–1)		35,335	39–38

July: 11–15 (Home: 7–7, Away: 4–8)

#	Date	Opponent	Score	Win	Loss	Save	Attendance	Record
78	July 1	@ Orioles	6–2	**Masterson** (5–7)	Matusz (5–10)		16,689	40–38
79	July 2	Angels	3–0	Weaver (9–1)	**Jiménez** (7–7)	Downs (7)	21,616	40–39
80	July 3	Angels	9–5	**McAllister** (3–1)	Haren (6–8)		29,292	41–39
81	July 4	Angels	12–3	**Lowe** (8–6)	Santana (4–9)		20,979	42–39
82	July 5	Rays	3–1	**Tomlin** (5–5)	Hellickson (4–5)	**C. Perez** (24)	26,577	43–39
83	July 6	Rays	10–3	Cobb (4–5)	**Masterson** (5–8)		28,734	43–40
84	July 7	Rays	7–3	**Jiménez** (8–7)	Moore (5–6)		20,658	44–40
85	July 8	Rays	7–6	Peralta (1–3)	**C. Perez** (0–2)	Rodney (25)	19,163	44–41
86	July 13	@ Blue Jays	1–0	**Masterson** (6–8)	Romero (8–5)	**C. Perez** (25)	32,308	45–41
87	July 14	@ Blue Jays	11–9	Laffey (1–1)	**Jiménez** (8–8)	Janssen (13)	32,517	45–42
88	July 15	@ Blue Jays	3–0	Villanueva (4–0)	**Lowe** (8–7)	Oliver (1)	26,407	45–43
89	July 16	@ Rays	3–2	**McAllister** (4–1)	Cobb (4–6)	**C. Perez** (26)	14,337	46–43
90	July 17	@ Rays	4–2	Moore (6–6)	**Tomlin** (5–6)	Rodney (27)	15,712	46–44
91	July 18	@ Rays	10–6	**Rogers** (1–2)	Farnsworth (0–2)		15,143	47–44
92	July 19	@ Rays	6–0	Price (13–4)	**Jiménez** (8–9)		27,856	47–45
93	July 20	Orioles	10–2	González (2–1)	**Lowe** (8–8)		33,954	47–46
94	July 21	Orioles	3–1	Tillman (2–1)	**McAllister** (4–2)	Johnson (29)	36,247	47–47
95	July 22	Orioles	4–3	Britton (1–0)	**Tomlin** (5–7)	Johnson (30)	28,049	47–48
96	July 23	Orioles	3–1	**Masterson** (7–8)	Hunter (4–5)	**C. Perez** (27)	18,264	48–48
97	July 24	Tigers	3–2	**Smith** (6–2)	Fister (4–7)	**C. Perez** (28)	23,637	49–48
98	July 25	Tigers	5–3	Scherzer (10–5)	**Lowe** (8–9)	Valverde (19)	24,029	49–49
99	July 26	Tigers	5–3	**Smith** (7–2)	Verlander (11–6)	**C. Perez** (29)	34,579	50–49
100	July 27	@ Twins	11–0	Diamond (9–4)	**Tomlin** (5–8)		37,820	50–50
101	July 28	@ Twins	12–5	Deduno (2–0)	**Masterson** (7–9)		39,166	50–51
102	July 29	@ Twins	5–1	Duensing (2–6)	**Jiménez** (8–10)		34,720	50–52
103	July 31	@ Royals	8–3	Hochevar (7–9)	**Lowe** (8–10)		18,569	50–53

August 5–24 (Home: 4–11, Road: 1–13)

#	Date	Opponent	Score	Win	Loss	Save	Attendance	Record
104	August 1	@ Royals	5–2	Mendoza (5–7)	**McAllister** (4–3)	Holland (1)	17,033	50–54
105	August 2	@ Royals	7–6 (11)	Crow (2–1)	**Rogers** (1–3)		15,135	50–55
106	August 3	@ Tigers	10–2	Sánchez (6–8)	**Masterson** (7–10)		41,502	50–56
107	August 4	@ Tigers	6–1	Fister (6–7)	**Jiménez** (8–11)		42,744	50–57
108	August 5	@ Tigers	10–8 (10)	Downs (1–0)	**C. Perez** (0–3)		38,007	50–58
109	August 6	Twins	14–3	Diamond (10–5)	**McAllister** (4–4)		18,775	50–59
110	August 7	Twins	7–5	Robertson (1–0)	**C. Perez** (0–4)	Perkins (7)	14,813	50–60
111	August 8	Twins	6–2	**Masterson** (8–10)	Duensing (2–7)		18,805	51–60
112	August 9	Red Sox	5–3	**Jiménez** (9–11)	Doubront (10–6)	**C. Perez** (30)	19,639	52–60
113	August 10	Red Sox	3–2	Buchholz (10–3)	**Seddon** (0–1)		27,246	52–61
114	August 11	Red Sox	5–2	**McAllister** (5–4)	Morales (3–3)	**C. Perez** (31)	27,894	53–61
115	August 12	Red Sox	14–1	Lester (6–10)	**Kluber** (0–1)		27,488	53–62
116	August 13	@ Angels	6–2	**Masterson** (9–10)	Wilson (9–9)	**C. Perez** (32)	36,620	54–62
117	August 14	@ Angels	9–6	Greinke (10–4)	**Jiménez** (9–12)	Frieri (14)	39,827	54–63
118	August 15	@ Angels	8–4	Santana (6–10)	**Hernández** (0–1)		37,554	54–64
119	August 17	@ Athletics	6–4	Norberto (4–1)	**Smith** (7–3)	Balfour (10)	13,967	54–65
120	August 18	@ Athletics	8–5	Colón (10–9)	**Kluber** (0–2)	Balfour (11)	30,132	54–66
121	August 19	@ Athletics	7–0	Parker (8–7)	**Masterson** (9–11)		20,130	54–67
122	August 20	@ Mariners	5–3	Furbush (5–2)	**Smith** (7–4)	Wilhelmsen (18)	14,687	54–68
123	August 21	@ Mariners	5–1	Hernández (12–5)	**Hernández** (0–2)	Luetge (2)	39,204	54–69
124	August 22	@ Mariners	3–1	Pryor (3–0)	**Pestano** (3–1)	Wilhelmsen (19)	18,578	54–70
125	August 24	Yankees	3–1	Sabathia (13–3)	**Allen** (0–1)	Soriano (32)	27,986	54–71
126	August 25	Yankees	3–1	**Masterson** (10–11)	Kuroda (12–9)	**C. Perez** (33)	34,374	55–71
127	August 26	Yankees	4–2	Logan (5–2)	**Jiménez** (9–13)	Soriano (33)	26,166	55–72
128	August 27	Athletics	3–0	Anderson (2–0)	**Hernández** (0–3)	Balfour (15)	13,018	55–73
129	August 28	Athletics	7–0	Milone (11–9)	**McAllister** (5–5)		13,413	55–74
130	August 29	Athletics	8–4	Blackley (5–3)	**Kluber** (0–3)	Cook (13)	14,412	55–75
131	August 30	Athletics	12–7	Parker (9–7)	**Masterson** (10–12)		14,500	55–76
132	August 31	Rangers	5–3	Dempster (9–6)	**Jiménez** (9–14)	Nathan (28)	16,700	55–77

September/October 13–17 (Home: 6–8, Road: 7–9)

#	Date	Opponent	Score	Win	Loss	Save	Attendance	Record
133	September 1	Rangers	4–3	**Gómez** (5–7)	Feldman (6–11)	**Pestano** (1)	17,218	56–77
134	September 2	Rangers	8–3	Holland (10–6)	**McAllister** (5–6)		19,474	56–78
135	September 3	@ Tigers	3–2	**Kluber** (1–3)	Downs (1–1)	**Pestano** (2)	35,418	57–78
136	September 4	@ Tigers	3–2	**Masterson** (11–12)	Porcello (9–11)	**C. Perez** (34)	27,729	58–78
137	September 5	@ Tigers	7–1	Fister (8–8)	**Jiménez** (9–15)		28,881	58–79
138	September 7	@ Twins	7–6	**Huff** (1–0)	Robertson (1–2)	**C. Perez** (35)	30,111	59–79
139	September 8	@ Twins	3–0	De Vries (5–5)	**McAllister** (5–7)	Perkins (11)	33,698	59–80
140	September 9	@ Twins	8–7	Duensing (4–10)	**Pestano** (3–2)		30,219	59–81
141	September 10	@ Twins	7–2	Deduno (6–3)	**Masterson** (11–13)		27,526	59–82
142	September 11	@ Rangers	6–4	Harrison (16–9)	**Jiménez** (9–16)	Nathan (32)	34,765	59–83
143	September 12	@ Rangers	5–2	Dempster (11–6)	**Gómez** (5–8)	Nathan (33)	36,001	59–84
144	September 13	@ Rangers	5–4	**Maine** (1–0)	Nathan (2–4)	**C. Perez** (36)	36,102	60–84
145	September 14	Tigers	4–0	Verlander (14–8)	**Kluber** (1–4)		17,185	60–85
146	September 15	Tigers	5–3	Sánchez (8–12)	**Masterson** (11–14)	Valverde (31)	22,849	60–86
147	September 16	Tigers	7–6	**Rogers** (2–1)	Valverde (3–3)		17,233	61–86
148	September 18	Twins	6–5 (12)	Robertson (2–2)	**Maine** (2–2)	Perkins (12)	10,342	61–87
149	September 19	Twins	6–4	Hendriks (1–7)	**McAllister** (5–8)	Perkins (13)	13,519	61–88
150	September 20	Twins	4–3 (10)	**Rogers** (3–3)	Swarzak (3–5)		12,331	62–88
151	September 21	@ Royals	6–3	Mendoza (8–9)	**Masterson** (11–15)	Holland (15)	22,805	62–89
152	September 22	@ Royals	5–3	Smith (6–8)	**Jiménez** (9–17)	Herrera (2)	24,304	62–90
153	September 23	@ Royals	15–4	**Huff** (2–0)	Odorizzi (0–1)		22,960	63–90
154	September 24	@ White Sox	5–4	Myers (3–7)	**Pestano** (3–3)	Veal (1)	20,206	63–91
155	September 25	@ White Sox	4–3	**Kluber** (2–4)	Liriano (6–12)	**C. Perez** (37)	13,797	64–91
156	September 26	@ White Sox	6–4	**Sipp** (1–2)	Thornton (4–9)	**C. Perez** (38)	20,166	65–91
157	September 28	Royals	8–5	**Huff** (3–0)	Smith (6–9)	**C. Perez** (39)	14,850	66–91
158	September 29	Royals	7–6 (14)	Mazzaro (4–3)	**Maine** (2–3)	Herrera (3)	17,109	66–92
159	September 30	Royals	15–3	**McAllister** (6–8)	Hochevar (8–16)		18,099	67–92
160	October 1	White Sox	11–0	Santiago (4–1)	**Kluber** (2–5)		14,756	67–93
161	October 2	White Sox	4–3 (12)	**Seddon** (1–1)	Thornton (4–10)		10,015	68–93
162	October 3	White Sox	9–0	Floyd (12–11)	**Huff** (3–1)		18,093	68–94

== Player stats ==
=== Batting ===
Note: G = Games played; AB = At bats; R = Runs scored; H = Hits; 2B = Doubles; 3B = Triples; HR = Home runs; RBI = Runs batted in; AVG = Batting average; SB = Stolen bases

Player	G	AB	R	H	2B	3B	HR	RBI	AVG	SB
Jeremy Accardo	4	0	0	0	0	0	0	0	—	0
Scott Barnes	1	0	0	0	0	0	0	0	—	0
Michael Brantley	149	552	63	159	37	4	6	60	.288	12
Asdrúbal Cabrera	143	555	70	150	35	1	16	68	.270	9
Russ Canzler	26	93	9	25	3	0	3	11	.269	0
Luke Carlin	4	14	2	3	1	0	0	1	.214	1
Ezequiel Carrera	48	147	20	40	6	3	2	11	.272	8
Lonnie Chisenhall	43	142	16	38	6	1	5	16	.268	2
Shin-Soo Choo	155	598	88	169	43	2	16	67	.283	21
Aaron Cunningham	72	97	5	17	4	0	1	7	.175	0
Johnny Damon	64	207	25	46	6	2	4	19	.222	4
Juan Díaz	5	15	4	4	0	0	0	0	.267	0
Jason Donald	43	124	18	25	2	1	2	11	.202	4
Shelley Duncan	81	232	29	47	10	0	11	31	.203	1
Jeanmar Gómez	2	4	0	1	0	0	0	0	.250	0
Travis Hafner	66	219	23	50	6	2	12	34	.228	0
Nick Hagadone	2	0	0	0	0	0	0	0	—	0
Jack Hannahan	105	287	23	70	16	0	4	29	.244	0
Ubaldo Jiménez	2	5	0	0	0	0	0	0	.000	0
Jason Kipnis	152	591	86	152	22	4	14	76	.257	31
Casey Kotchman	142	463	46	106	12	0	12	55	.229	3
Matt LaPorta	22	58	2	14	2	0	1	5	.241	0
Brent Lillibridge	43	111	15	24	5	0	3	8	.216	6
José López	66	213	16	53	13	0	4	28	.249	0
Derek Lowe	1	2	0	1	0	0	0	0	.500	0
Scott Maine	1	0	0	0	0	0	0	0	—	0
Lou Marson	70	195	27	44	8	2	0	13	.226	4
Justin Masterson	1	2	0	0	0	0	0	0	.000	0
Thomas Neal	9	23	2	5	1	0	0	2	.217	0
Chris Perez	3	0	0	0	0	0	0	0	—	0
Vinnie Pestano	2	0	0	0	0	0	0	0	—	0
Cord Phelps	14	33	2	7	0	0	1	5	.212	0
Esmil Rogers	3	1	0	1	0	0	0	0	1.000	0
Vinny Rottino	18	28	4	3	1	0	1	2	.107	1
Carlos Santana	143	507	72	128	27	2	18	76	.252	3
Tony Sipp	2	0	0	0	0	0	0	0	—	0
Joe Smith	4	0	0	0	0	0	0	0	—	0
Josh Tomlin	2	5	0	2	0	0	0	0	.400	0
Team Totals	162	5525	667	1385	266	24	136	635	.251	110

=== Pitching ===
Note: W = Wins; L = Losses; ERA = Earned run average; G = Games pitched; GS = Games started; SV = Saves; IP = Innings pitched; H = Hits allowed; R = Runs allowed; ER = Earned runs allowed; BB = Walks allowed; K = Strikeouts

Player	W	L	ERA	G	GS	SV	IP	H	R	ER	BB	K
Jeremy Accardo	0	0	4.58	26	0	0	35.1	38	19	18	16	28
Cody Allen	0	1	3.72	27	0	0	29.0	29	12	12	15	27
Jairo Asencio	1	1	5.96	18	0	0	25.2	27	17	17	8	21
Scott Barnes	0	0	4.26	16	0	0	19.0	17	9	9	7	16
Jeanmar Gómez	5	8	5.96	20	17	0	90.2	95	66	60	34	47
Nick Hagadone	1	0	6.39	27	0	1	25.1	26	18	18	15	26
Roberto Hernández	0	3	7.53	3	3	0	14.1	17	15	12	3	2
Frank Herrmann	0	0	2.33	15	0	0	19.1	12	5	5	4	14
David Huff	3	1	3.38	6	4	0	26.2	30	14	10	5	19
Ubaldo Jiménez	9	17	5.55	31	31	0	176.2	190	116	109	95	143
Corey Kluber	2	5	5.14	12	12	0	63.0	76	44	36	18	54
Derek Lowe	8	10	5.52	21	21	0	119.0	156	79	73	45	41
Scott Maine	1	2	10.50	9	0	0	6.0	13	7	7	3	6
Justin Masterson	11	15	4.93	34	34	0	206.1	212	122	113	88	159
Zach McAllister	6	8	4.24	22	22	0	125.1	133	78	59	38	110
Chris Perez	0	4	3.59	61	0	39	57.2	49	25	23	16	59
Rafael Pérez	1	0	3.52	8	0	0	7.2	5	3	3	4	4
Vinnie Pestano	3	2	2.57	70	0	2	70.0	53	20	20	24	76
Esmil Rogers	3	1	3.06	44	0	0	53.0	47	19	18	12	54
Chris Seddon	1	1	3.67	17	2	0	34.1	35	15	14	13	18
Tony Sipp	1	2	4.42	63	0	1	55.0	47	29	27	23	51
Joe Smith	7	4	2.96	72	0	0	67.0	53	27	22	25	53
Josh Tomlin	5	8	6.36	21	16	0	103.1	126	74	73	25	56
Dan Wheeler	0	0	8.76	12	0	0	12.1	17	12	12	7	2
Team Totals	68	94	4.78	162	162	43	1442.0	1503	845	769	543	1086

=== Roster ===
2012 Cleveland Indians
Roster
Pitchers: 57 Jeremy Accardo; 37 Cody Allen; 32 Jairo Asencio; 51 Scott Barnes; 58 Jeanmar Gómez; 50 Nick Hagadone; 55 Roberto Hernández; 56 Frank Herrmann; 31 David Huff; 30 Ubaldo Jiménez; 28 Corey Kluber; 26 Derek Lowe; 57 Scott Maine; 63 Justin Masterson; 34 Zach McAllister; 54 Chris Perez; 53 Rafael Pérez; 52 Vinnie Pestano; 32 Esmil Rogers; 44 Chris Seddon; 49 Tony Sipp; 38 Joe Smith; 43 Josh Tomlin; 44 Dan Wheeler	Catchers: 45 Luke Carlin; 6 Lou Marson; 41 Carlos Santana; Infielders: 13 Asdrúbal Cabrera; 8 Lonnie Chisenhall; 29 Juan Díaz; 16 Jason Donald; 9 Jack Hannahan; 22 Jason Kipnis; 35 Casey Kotchman; 7 Matt LaPorta; 1 Brent Lillibridge; 4 José López; 46 Cord Phelps	Outfielders: 23 Michael Brantley; 4 Russ Canzler; 12 Ezequiel Carrera; 17 Shin-Soo Choo; 2 Aaron Cunningham; 33 Johnny Damon; 47 Shelley Duncan; 36 Thomas Neal; 25 Vinny Rottino; Other batters: 48 Travis Hafner	Manager: 11 Manny Acta; 15 Sandy Alomar Jr.; Coaches: 15 Sandy Alomar Jr. (bench); 64 Armando Camacaro (bullpen catcher); 40 Bruce Fields (hitting); 27 Dave Miller (bullpen); 60 Francisco Morales (bullpen catcher); 33 Ruben Niebla (pitching); 36 Scott Radinsky (pitching); –– Mike Sarbaugh (bench); 10 Steve Smith (third base); 20 Tom Wiedenbauer (first base)

== Notes/records ==
- On April 5, the Indians and Toronto Blue Jays set the Major League record for the longest Opening Day game, a 16-inning, 7–4 Indians loss.
- On April 16, the Indians set a franchise record by scoring 8+ runs in their first three road games. On April 18, they extended the record to four games.
- On May 7, Zach McAllister recorded his first career win and Nick Hagadone recorded his first career save, the first time for Indians pitchers in the same game since 1993.
- On May 15, Derek Lowe pitched a complete-game shutout without recording a strikeout, the first time an Indians pitcher did so since 1973.
- On May 17, Travis Hafner broke a franchise record (Nap Lajoie) with his 80th career hit-by-pitch.
- On May 22, Vinnie Pestano broke a franchise record for relievers (Paul Shuey), recording a strikeout in 22 consecutive appearances. On May 23, he extended the record to 23 consecutive appearances.
- On May 29, Luke Carlin reached base on errors three times, the first time an Indians player did so in one game since 1973.
- On June 15, Michael Brantley extended his hitting streak to 22 games, the longest for the Indians since 2007.
- On June 19, trailing 2–1 in the 10th, shortstop Asdrúbal Cabrera hit a walk-off home run off of Cincinnati Reds' closer, Aroldis Chapman to defeat the Reds 3–2.
- On July 1, Asdrúbal Cabrera and pitcher Chris Perez were selected for the All-Star team, the second selection for both players.
- On August 5, Travis Hafner hit his 200th career home run.

== Farm system ==
Level	Team	League	Manager
AAA	Columbus Clippers	International League	Mike Sarbaugh
AA	Akron Aeros	Eastern League	Chris Tremie
A	Carolina Mudcats	Carolina League	Edwin Rodríguez
A	Lake County Captains	Midwest League	David Wallace
A-Short Season	Mahoning Valley Scrappers	New York–Penn League	Ted Kubiak
Rookie	AZL Indians	Arizona League	Tony Medrano

LEAGUE CHAMPIONS: Akron
