= Vinnie Pestano =

American baseball player (born 1985)

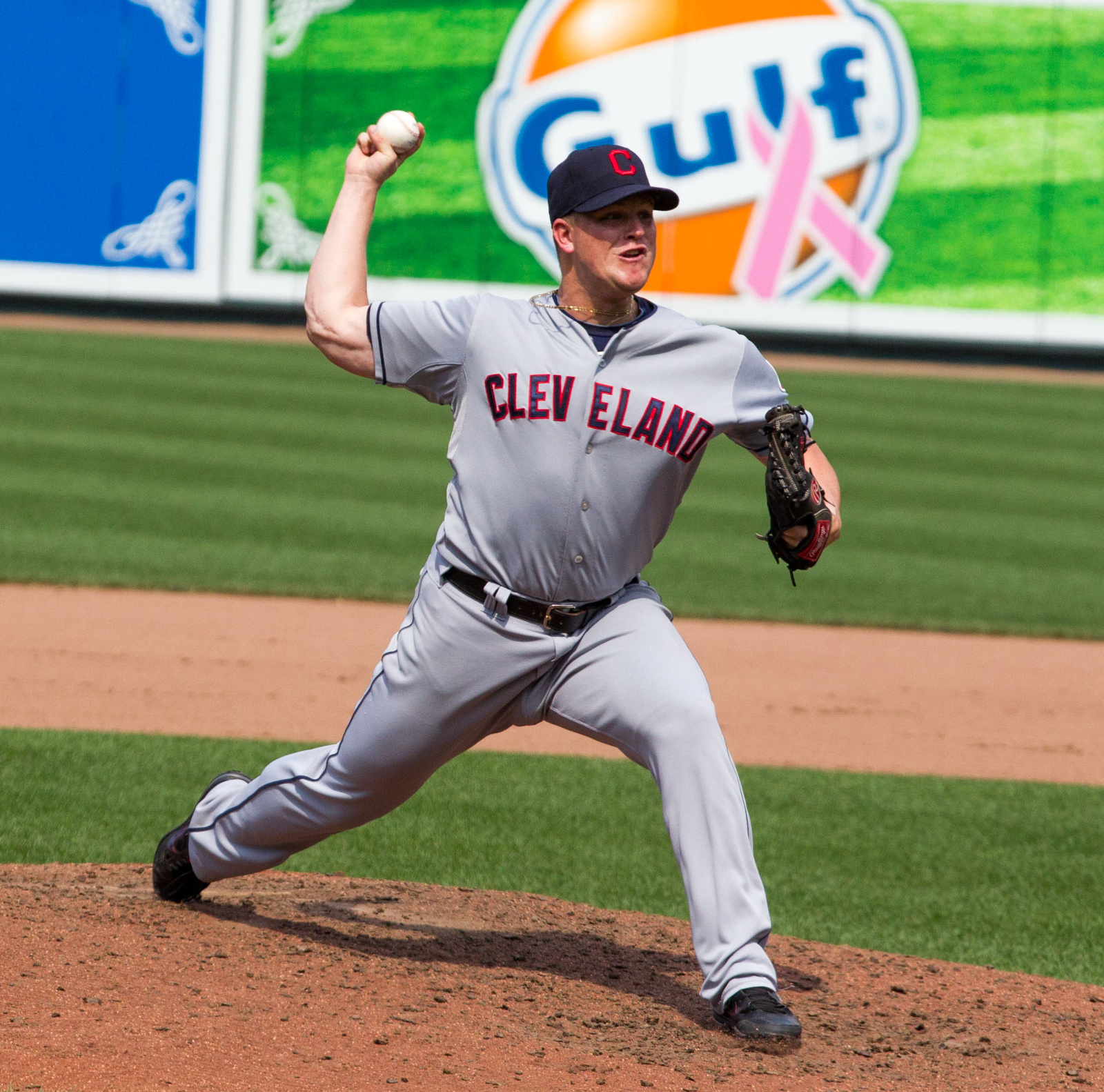
- Pestano with the Cleveland Indians
- Pitcher
- Born: February 20, 1985 (age 41); Huntington Beach, California, U.S.
- Batted: Right Threw: Right

MLB debut
- September 23, 2010, for the Cleveland Indians

Last MLB appearance
- July 11, 2015, for the Los Angeles Angels of Anaheim

MLB statistics
- Win–loss record: 6–8
- Earned run average: 2.98
- Strikeouts: 244
- Stats at Baseball Reference

Teams
- Cleveland Indians (2010–2014); Los Angeles Angels of Anaheim (2014–2015)

Vincent "Vinnie" William Pestano (born February 20, 1985) is an American former professional baseball relief pitcher. He played in Major League Baseball (MLB) for the Cleveland Indians and Los Angeles Angels.

== Professional career ==
=== Cleveland Indians ===
Pestano attended Canyon High School (Anaheim, California) and California State University, Fullerton before being drafted by the Cleveland Indians in the 20th round, with the 611th overall selection, of the 2006 MLB draft. Since 2007, Pestano has played in minor league baseball with the Triple-A Columbus Clippers, Double-A Akron Aeros, High-A Kinston Indians, Single-A Lake County Captains, and Low-A Mahoning Valley Scrappers.

On September 23, 2010, Pestano was selected to the 40-man roster and promoted to the major leagues for the first time. He made his MLB debut the same day, pitching one scoreless inning in relief. In 5 appearances for Cleveland during his rookie season, Pestano posted a 3.60 ERA with 8 strikeouts and 1 save across 5 innings pitched. Pestano made 67 appearances for the Indians in 2011, registering a 2.32 ERA with 84 strikeouts and 2 saves over 62 innings of work.

Pestano made 70 appearances out of the bullpen for Cleveland during the 2012 season, compiling a 3-3 record and 2.57 ERA with 76 strikeouts across 70 innings. He pitched in 37 games for the team in 2013, posting a 1-2 record and 4.08 ERA with 37 strikeouts and 6 saves across 35 1/3 innings pitched. Pestano made 13 appearances for the Indians in 2014, but struggled to a 5.00 ERA with 13 strikeouts over 9 innings.

=== Los Angeles Angels ===
On August 7, 2014, Pestano was traded to the Los Angeles Angels of Anaheim in exchange for Mike Clevinger. He was recalled by the Angels on August 10 after one game with the Triple-A Salt Lake Bees, but was sent back down on August 16 after just one appearance with the Angels. On July 28, 2015, he was designated for assignment to make roster room for David DeJesus and David Murphy. He cleared waivers and was sent outright to Triple-A Salt Lake Bees on August 3. He elected free agency after the season on October 5.

=== New York Yankees ===
On February 5, 2016, Pestano signed a minor league contract with the New York Yankees. In 8 appearances for the Triple-A Scranton/Wilkes-Barre RailRiders, he recorded a 3.38 ERA with 16 strikeouts across 10 2/3 innings pitched. Pestano was released by the Yankees organization on July 5.

=== Bridgeport Bluefish ===
On April 4, 2017, Pestano signed with the Bridgeport Bluefish of the Atlantic League of Professional Baseball. In 26 appearances for the Bluefish, he registered a 1-1 record and 3.25 ERA with 30 strikeouts across 27 2/3 innings pitched. Pestano became a free agent following the season.

=== Long Island Ducks ===
On November 1, 2017, Pestano was drafted by the Long Island Ducks in the Bridgeport Bluefish dispersal draft. On March 29, 2018, Pestano signed with the Ducks for the 2018 season. In 18 games for Long Island, he compiled a 1-1 record and 3.50 ERA with 19 strikeouts and 2 saves across 18 innings of work. On June 13, Pestano announced his retirement from professional baseball.

== Pitching style ==
Pestano throws three pitches. His main pitch is a four-seam fastball that is typically thrown between 90 and 93 mph. His secondary pitch is a breaking ball in the low 80s that is referred to by various sources as a curveball or a slider. He also occasionally throws a two-seam fastball.

== In popular culture ==
Pestano was referenced in season 8, episode 4 (Who Wants to be a Godparent?) of How I Met Your Mother. After Barney supposedly throws a brick through an upper-story window in a flashback, Ted doubtingly says, "Yeah right. I've seen Barney throw, he's no Vinnie Pestano, am I right? ...Beloved Indians middle reliever!"

Preceded by Asdrúbal Cabrera	Bob Feller Man of the Year Award; 2012	Succeeded by Incumbent
