= Juan Díaz (shortstop) =

Dominican baseball player (born 1988)

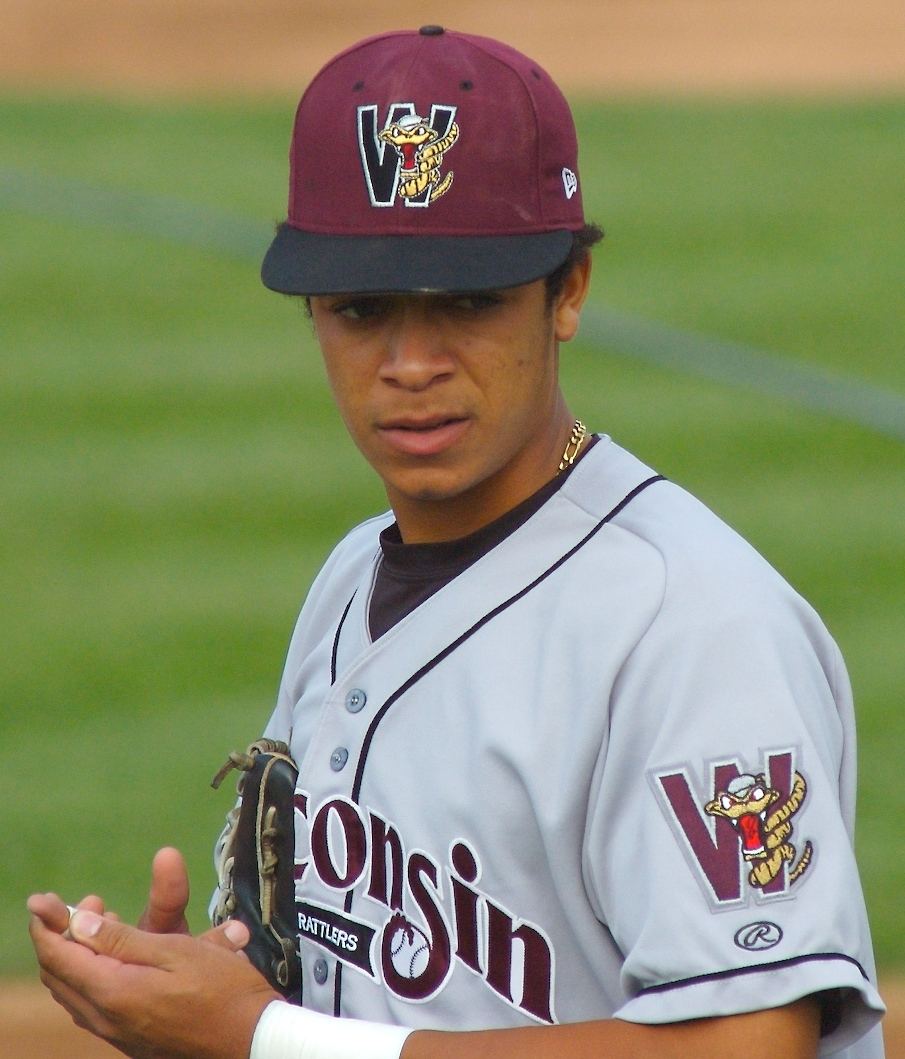
- Díaz with the Wisconsin Timber Rattlers in 2007
- Shortstop
- Born: December 12, 1988 (age 37); Baní, Dominican Republic
- Batted: Switch Threw: Right

MLB debut
- May 25, 2012, for the Cleveland Indians

Last MLB appearance
- May 29, 2012, for the Cleveland Indians

MLB statistics
- Batting average: .267
- Home runs: 0
- Runs batted in: 0
- Stats at Baseball Reference

Teams
- Cleveland Indians (2012)

Juan Habisail Diaz (born December 12, 1988) is a Dominican former professional baseball shortstop. He signed as a non-drafted free agent on April 20, 2006, by Seattle Mariners an played in Major League Baseball (MLB) for the Cleveland Indians in 2012.

== Professional career ==
=== Seattle Mariners ===
In 2006, his first professional season, Díaz batted .191 in 178 at-bats for the Dominican Summer League Mariners. He drove in 23 runs and had an on-base percentage of .324. He played shortstop for 44 of 47 games and 3 games at third base.

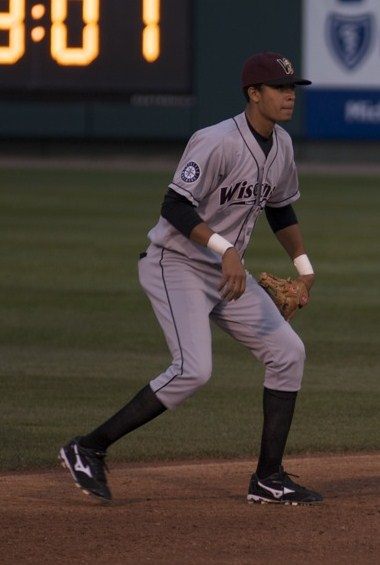
Juan Díaz in 2008.

Díaz began the 2007 season with the Class-A High Desert Mavericks appearing in six games. He was transferred to the Peoria Mariners on May 24 and then the Single-A Wisconsin Timber Rattlers on June 4. He hit .333 with five runs scored, six doubles and 11 RBIs in 22 games in May. He had season-high 10-game hitting streak, hitting .375 from June 21–30. Díaz took part in the Mariners 2007 Arizona Fall League playing for the Peoria Javelinas.

He spent the 2008 season with Wisconsin, appearing in 122 games. He recorded five hit streaks of five or more game, including a season-high seven-game hit streak from June 19–25. He recorded 22 multi-hit games, including four season-high three-hit games. Díaz participated in the Mariners Advance Development League in Peoria.

Díaz split the 2009 season with the Mavericks and the Peoria Mariners. During his time with Peoria he compiled three hits in three at-bats with one home run. With the Mavericks he hit .311 with 101 hits, four home runs and 29 RBIs in 84 games. He was a California League Mid-Season All-Star in his best offensive season to date.

=== Cleveland Indians ===
On June 26, 2010, Diaz was traded to the Cleveland Indians along with Ezequiel Carrera for Russell Branyan.

The Indians purchased Díaz's contract on November 18, 2011. Díaz was called up to the Indians on May 25, 2012.

On June 4, 2013, Diaz was called up from the Triple-A Columbus Clippers to fill in for All-Star shortstop Asdrúbal Cabrera who had been put on the 15-day DL earlier that day. He was optioned back to Columbus on June 11 when John McDonald was activated. He was designated for assignment on September 1.

=== Miami Marlins ===
Díaz signed a minor league deal with the Miami Marlins on January 9, 2014.

=== Chicago White Sox ===
Díaz signed a minor league deal with the Chicago White Sox on January 22, 2015. He was released on April 12, 2015.

=== Miami Marlins (second stint) ===
Díaz signed a minor league deal with the Miami Marlins on April 14, 2015.

=== Pittsburgh Pirates ===
Díaz signed a minor league contract with the Pittsburgh Pirates on January 2, 2016. Working primarily as a pitcher, Díaz made four appearances for the rookie–level Bristol Pirates, compiling a 2.25 ERA with 2 strikeouts across 4 innings of work. He elected free agency following the season in November 7.
