= José López (infielder) =

Venezuelan baseball player (born 1983)

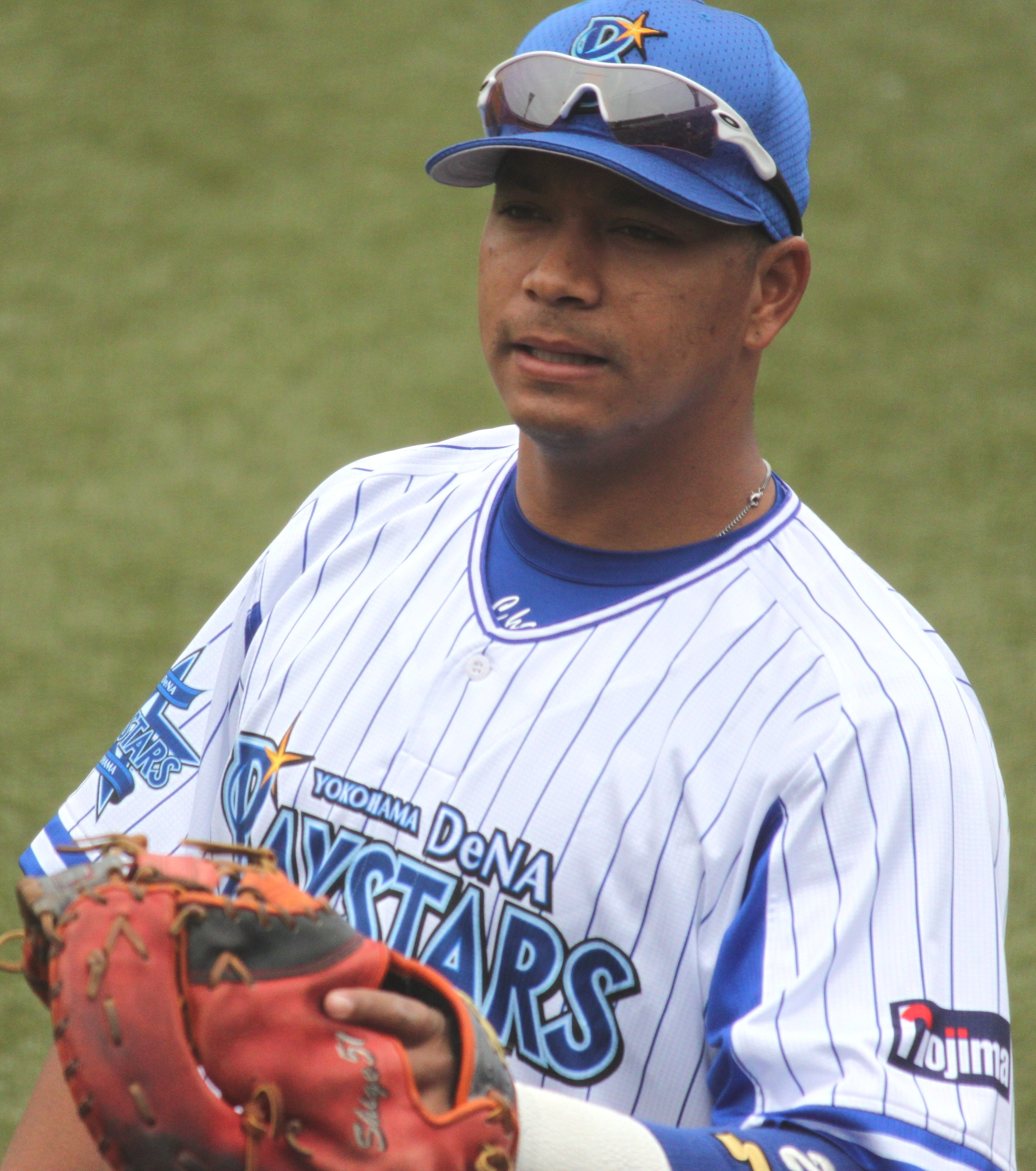
- López with the Yokohama DeNA BayStars in 2015
- Infielder
- Born: November 24, 1983 (age 42); Anzoategui State, Venezuela
- Batted: Right Threw: Right

Professional debut
- MLB: July 31, 2004, for the Seattle Mariners
- NPB: March 29, 2013, for the Yomiuri Giants

Last appearance
- MLB: October 3, 2012, for the Chicago White Sox
- NPB: November 5, 2020, for the Yokohama DeNA BayStars

MLB statistics
- Batting average: .262
- Home runs: 92
- Runs batted in: 480

NPB statistics
- Batting average: .274
- Home runs: 198
- Runs batted in: 588
- Stats at Baseball Reference

Teams
- Seattle Mariners (2004–2010); Colorado Rockies (2011); Florida Marlins (2011); Cleveland Indians (2012); Chicago White Sox (2012); Yomiuri Giants (2013–2014); Yokohama DeNA BayStars (2015–2020)

Career highlights and awards
- MLB: All-Star (2006); NPB: 3× All-Star (2015, 2018, 2019); 4× Golden Glove Award (2013, 2016–2018); Best Nine Award (2017); CLCS MVP (2017)

José Celestino López Echevarria (born November 24, 1983) is a Venezuelan former professional baseball infielder. López played in Major League Baseball (MLB) for the Seattle Mariners, Colorado Rockies, Florida Marlins, Cleveland Indians, and Chicago White Sox, and in Nippon Professional Baseball (NPB) for the Yomiuri Giants and Yokohama DeNA BayStars.

== Professional career ==
=== Seattle Mariners ===
In 2001, López was named the Everett AquaSox Most Valuable Player by the Mariners player development department. Later that season he participated in the Arizona Fall League. He was also named the Mariners' minor league "Player of the Year."

He was named Mariners' minor league "Player of the Year" with the San Bernardino Stampede in 2002, marking the second time he won this award. He led the California League with 169 hits and 39 doubles. His .324 average was second-highest among all Marines minor leaguers while his 31 steals ranked fourth. Later that year selected to play with the World Team at the All-Star Futures Game in Milwaukee.

López played three different infield positions (second base, shortstop and third base) in 132 games with the Double-A San Antonio Missions in 2003. He was third in the Texas League with 35 doubles. He had 41 multi-hit games, including four 4-hit games. At the all-star break he was selected to start for the Texas League. At the end of the season he was named to Texas League Postseason All-Star Team. López hit .391 with 3 runs, 2 home runs, a steal and 5 RBIs in five postseason games. He again played with Lara in the Venezuelan Winter League.

He hit .295 with 13 home runs, 39 RBIs in 74 games with the triple-A Tacoma Rainiers in 2004 before being called up on July 31. López made his major league debut on July 31, 2004. At the end of the season he hit .311 with 11 doubles, 10 HR, 29 RBI in 46 games with Lara in the Venezuelan Winter League, making this the third time he played for Lara.

In 2005, López battled extensive injury, going on the disabled list twice. In 44 games with Tacoma he hit .319 with five home runs and 31 RBIs.

He hit .232 with five home runs and 22 RBI in 57 games. López was selected as a replacement for the 2006 All-Star Game due to an injury to Robinson Canó. During this game, Lopez pinch-ran for Paul Konerko in the 9th inning and went on to score the game-tying run.

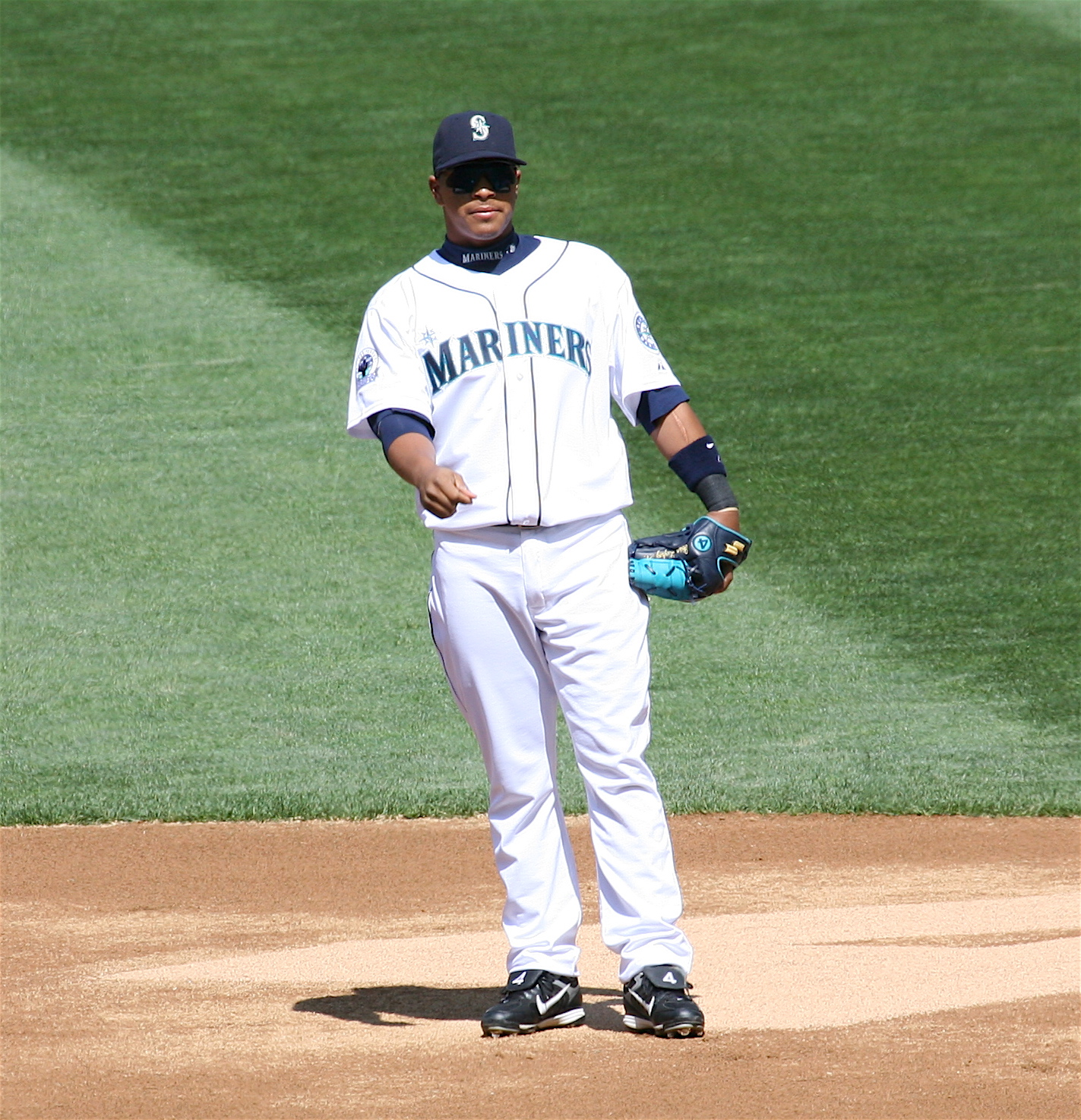
López playing the Seattle Mariners in 2007.

On May 27, 2008, López helped end a seven-game Mariner losing skid with a walk-off single off Boston reliever Mike Timlin to score Wladimir Balentien. The Mariners won 4–3 and López was later quoted saying jokingly, "I wanted to run to center field...I knew the team was coming to kill me."

On May 1, 2009, López hit a walk-off single in a 14-pitch at bat off of Oakland A's reliever Russ Springer. López fouled off nine consecutive pitches before hitting his walk-off single.

In 2009, he had the lowest range factor of all starting major league second basemen (4.27).

During spring training for the 2010 season, López was converted to a third baseman replacing teammate Chone Figgins who in turn took over the second base position.

In a game against the Chicago White Sox on April 23, 2010, López hit his first career grand slam home run against former Mariner J. J. Putz. López hit his second career grand slam off of Joba Chamberlain on July 10, 2010, in the bottom of the 8th inning leading the Mariners to a 4–1 victory over the New York Yankees.

On July 27, 2010, while running to first base in the 1st inning, López strained his left hamstring. He missed the following six games, returning on August 4. In his first at bat back, he hit a 2 RBI single against the Texas Rangers with the bases loaded and 2 outs in the first inning.

On September 22, 2010, López hit 3 home runs in one game. He was the first Mariner to do this since Mike Cameron in 2002 when he hit 4 against the Chicago White Sox.

=== Colorado Rockies ===
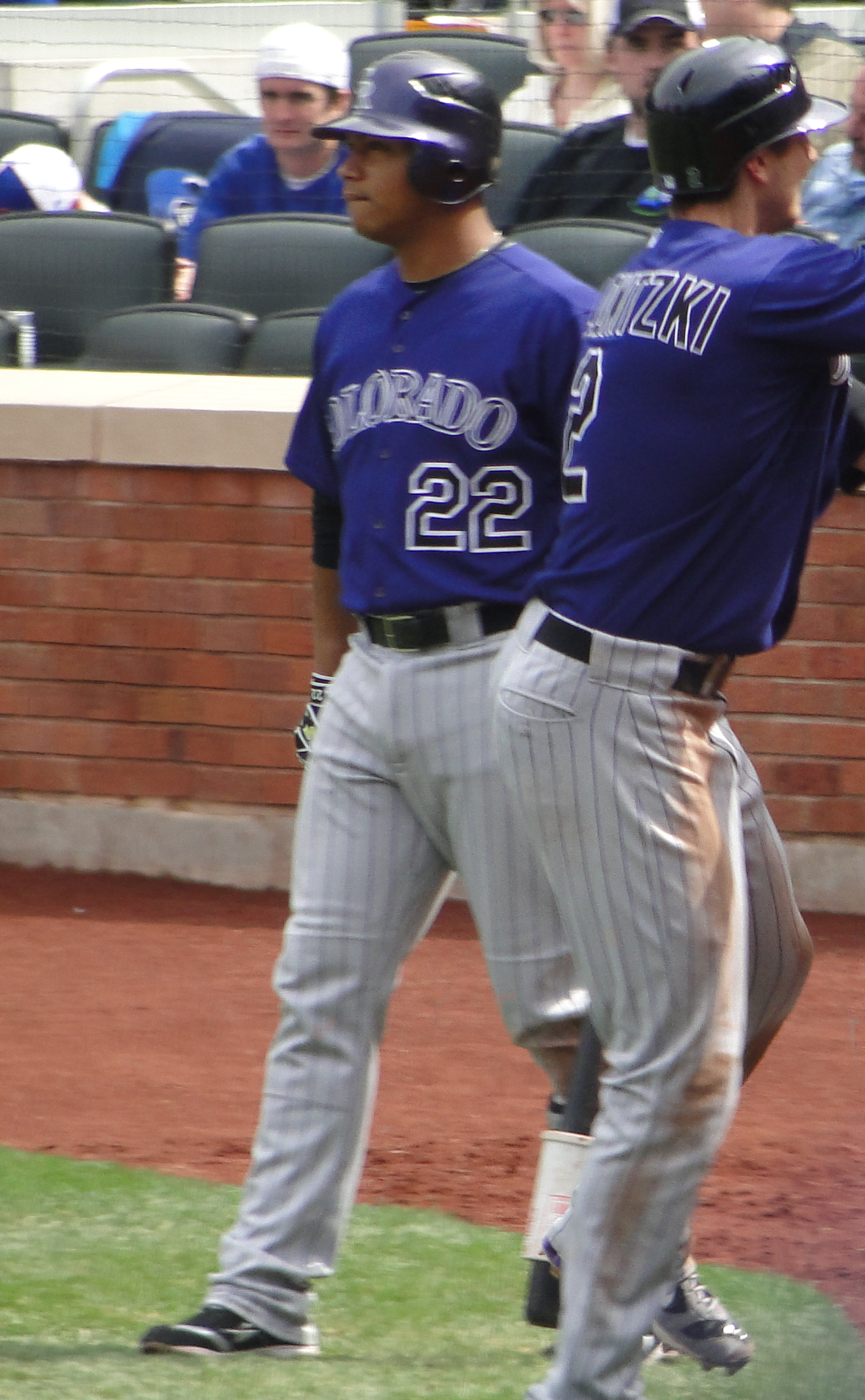
López with the Colorado Rockies in 2011.

López was traded to the Colorado Rockies for minor league pitching prospect Chaz Roe prior to the non-tender deadline.

In 38 games to start the 2011 season, López hit .208 with two home runs. On May 26, López was designated for assignment. He was released on June 7.

=== Florida Marlins ===
On June 9, 2011, days after being released by Colorado, López signed a minor league deal with the Florida Marlins. He had his contract purchased on June 15. He was designated for assignment on July 2, after making 31 plate appearances for the Marlins, hitting just .103. He showed remarkable improvement in August and September, returning to the Marlins and raising his batting average by more than 100 points to .231.

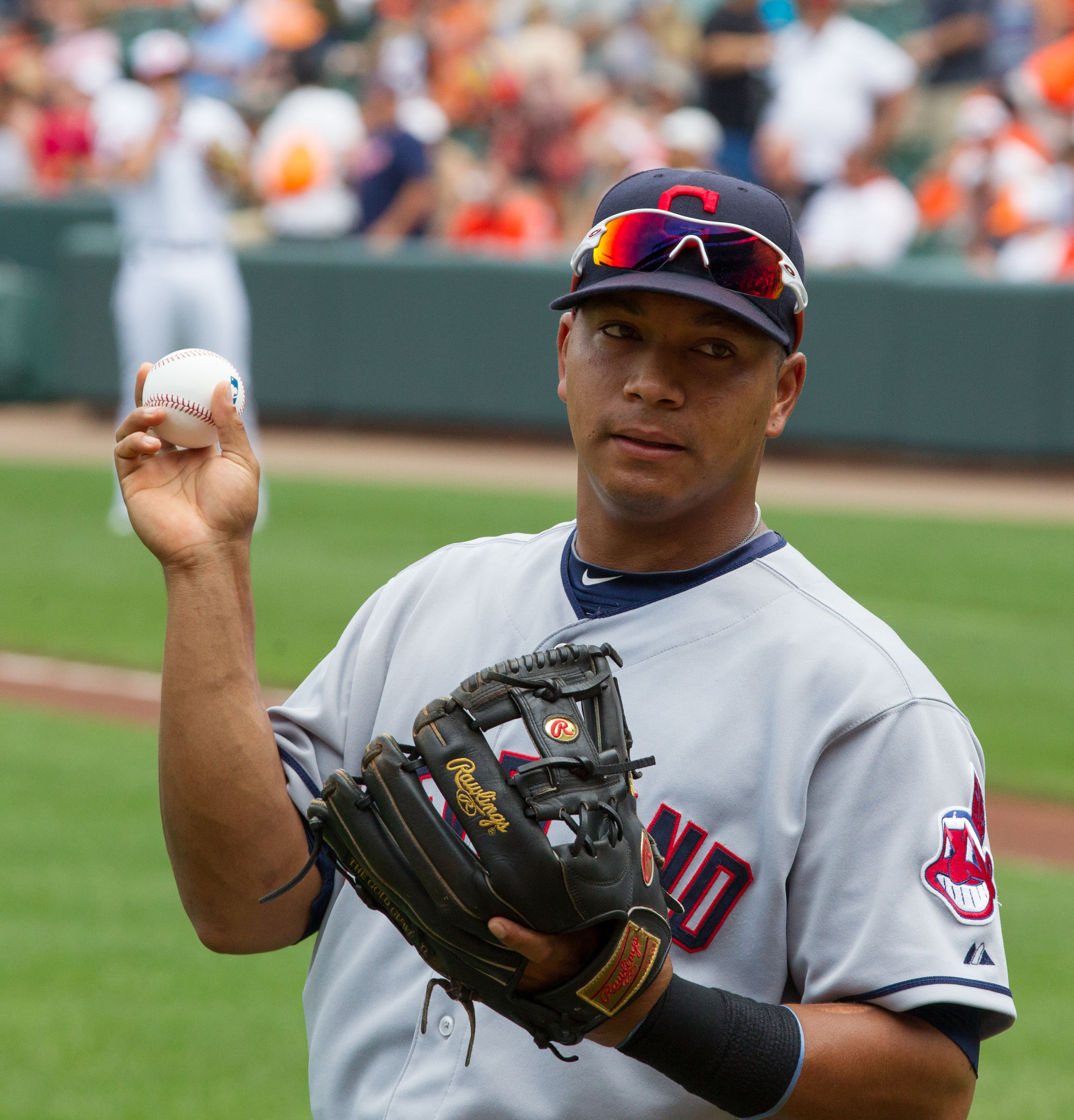
Jose Lopez with Cleveland in 2012

=== Cleveland Indians ===
López signed a minor league contract with the Cleveland Indians on December 16, 2011. He also received an invitation to spring training. On April 1, 2012, it was announced that López had made the major league roster as a reserve infielder. López was designated for assignment on May 1, to make room on the 40-man roster for Johnny Damon. After being subsequently outrighted to Triple-A Columbus, López's contract was purchased by the Indians again on May 12.

López was designated for assignment on August 7. He was released from the Indians August 12.

=== Chicago White Sox ===
The Chicago White Sox signed López to a minor league contract on August 14, 2012. López was assigned to the Triple-A Charlotte Knights of the International League. He debuted with the White Sox on August 30. In his final 15 games in the majors, he hit .217 with one double in 24 plate appearances over 15 games, starting only twice.

=== Yomiuri Giants ===
On January 7, 2013, López signed with the Yomiuri Giants of the NPB. López finished with a .303 average, 18 home runs and 55 RBI in 121 games for Yomiuri. Besides, he posted a .993 fielding percentage while playing 136 games at first base and was honored with the Golden Glove Award. He had a subpar season in 2014, hitting .243 with 22 homers and 57 RBI in 134 games.

=== Yokohama DeNA BayStars ===
On December 12, 2014, López signed with the Yokohama DeNA BayStars of the NPB. He made 140 game appearances In 2015, batting .291 with 25 home runs and 73 RBI.

In the 2016 season, López hit .263 and slugged .534 in 123 games, while collecting career-best marks with 34 home runs and 95 RBI. In addition, he committed only two errors in 1,106 total chances at first base, leading NPB first basemen with a .998 fielding percentage and winning his second Golden Glove Award, becoming just the third Latin American player to add more than one Golden Glove in Japanese baseball history. His countryman Robert Marcano continues to lead the group with four awards and the also Venezuelan Roberto Petagine is in second place with three.

In 2017, López was named most valuable player of the 2017 Central League Climax Series. The BayStars lost to the Fukuoka SoftBank Hawks in the 2017 Japan Series.

In 2018, he was selected 2018 NPB All-Star game. On November 18, 2019, López signed a 1-year extension to remain with the BayStars.

On October 31, 2020, López recorded his 1,000th hit in NPB, becoming the first non-Japanese player with more than 1,000 hits in both NPB and MLB. On December 2, he became a free agent.

After spending two seasons out of baseball, López announced his retirement from professional baseball on October 24, 2022.

== International career ==
López, along with teammates Félix Hernández and Carlos Silva, played for Venezuela in the 2009 World Baseball Classic. In Round 1 against the Netherlands, he hit a solo home run in a 3–1 win.

== Personal life ==
Before the Mariners' game against the Chicago Cubs on June 13, 2007, López was informed that his brother Gabriel died in a motorcycle accident in Venezuela. López still played in the game because his family told him he would not be able to make it home in time for the funeral and they wanted him to stay with the team and keep playing. He went 0-for-4 with an RBI in the game.

On June 16, 2009, he was put on the bereavement list again to visit his cancer-stricken sister but she died before he got there. López remained in Venezuela for his sister's funeral and did not play for about a week.

López and his wife have two children.

== See also ==
- List of Major League Baseball players from Venezuela
