= Asdrúbal Cabrera =

Venezuelan-American baseball player (born 1985)

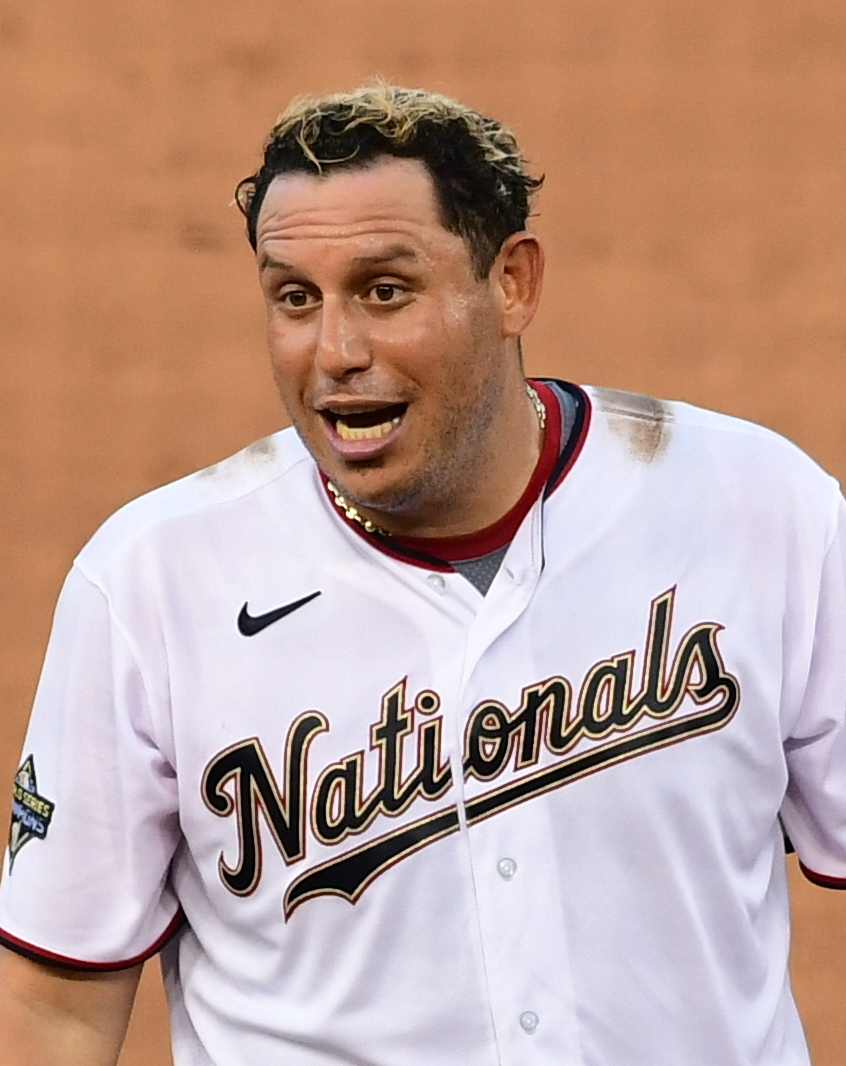
- Cabrera with the Washington Nationals in 2020

Guerreros de Oaxaca
- Infielder / Manager
- Born: November 13, 1985 (age 40); Puerto la Cruz, Venezuela
- Batted: Switch Threw: Right

MLB debut
- August 8, 2007, for the Cleveland Indians

Last MLB appearance
- September 28, 2021, for the Cincinnati Reds

MLB statistics
- Batting average: .266
- Home runs: 195
- Runs batted in: 869
- Stats at Baseball Reference

Teams
- Cleveland Indians (2007–2014); Washington Nationals (2014); Tampa Bay Rays (2015); New York Mets (2016–2018); Philadelphia Phillies (2018); Texas Rangers (2019); Washington Nationals (2019–2020); Arizona Diamondbacks (2021); Cincinnati Reds (2021)

Career highlights and awards
- 2× All-Star (2011, 2012); World Series champion (2019); Silver Slugger Award (2011)

Asdrúbal José Cabrera (Spanish pronunciation: [asˈðɾuβal kaˈβɾeɾa]; born November 13, 1985) is a Venezuelan-American former professional baseball infielder. He played in Major League Baseball (MLB) for the Cleveland Indians, Washington Nationals, Tampa Bay Rays, New York Mets, Philadelphia Phillies, Texas Rangers, Arizona Diamondbacks, and Cincinnati Reds. Cabrera, a switch hitter, is a two-time All-Star. He was primarily a middle infielder for most of his career, but transitioned to playing more third base during the 2017 season and began playing first base late in the 2019 season. He currently serves as manager for the Guerreros de Oaxaca of the Mexican League.

== Early life ==
Cabrera was raised by his parents, Asdrúbal, a truck driver, and Zunilde, a homemaker, in Puerto la Cruz, Venezuela. According to his family, Cabrera began switch hitting at three years old. In his youth, Cabrera closely followed Venezuelan shortstop Omar Vizquel's career. At 15 or 16 years old, he made a deal with his father that he would leave school and focus on baseball. If he were not signed within a year, he would return to school. At 15 years old he caught the attention of Seattle Mariners scout Emilio Carrasquel.

== Professional career ==
=== Minor leagues ===
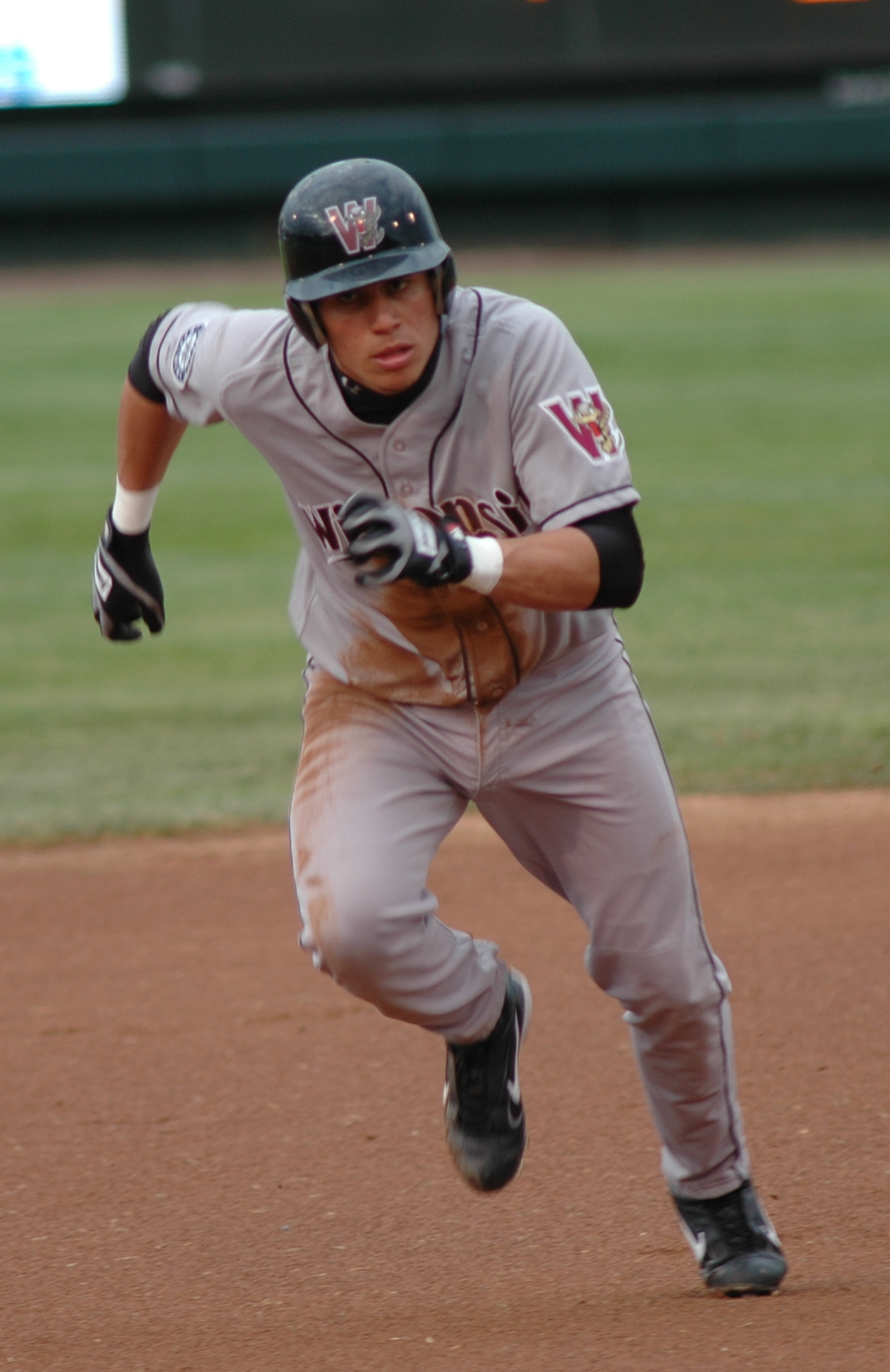
Cabrera playing for the Wisconsin Timber Rattlers in 2005

Cabrera was signed by the Seattle Mariners as an amateur free agent in 2002.

After coming up through the Mariners organization, he was acquired by the Cleveland Indians on June 30, 2006, in exchange for Eduardo Pérez. Cabrera spent the remainder of the 2006 season at Cleveland's Triple-A minor league team, the Buffalo Bisons, and hit .263 with a home run and 14 RBI in 52 games with the Bisons.

Cabrera was a non-roster invitee to the Indians 2007 spring training but was reassigned to their minor league camp March 16. He started 2007 at Double-A with the Akron Aeros and was named to the Eastern League mid-season All-Star team. He was promoted to Triple-A Buffalo on July 30, and then to Cleveland on August 7.

=== Cleveland Indians (2007–2014) ===
Cabrera made his major league debut on August 8, 2007, against the Chicago White Sox, starting at second base. He was hitless in three at-bats and scored a run after he was hit by a pitch in the sixth inning. Three days later, Cabrera picked up his first major league hit, a double, against Mike Mussina of the New York Yankees. Cabrera hit his first career home run on August 18, 2007, off Jason Hammel of the Tampa Bay Devil Rays in an 8–1 victory for the Indians. Cabrera eventually assumed Cleveland's everyday second baseman job despite being a natural shortstop, taking over for an ineffective Josh Barfield. In 2007, Cabrera helped power the Indians to a tie for the best record in baseball (96–66 with the Boston Red Sox) with his late-inning heroics. Cabrera batted .353 (18-for-51) in the seventh inning or later. For good luck, Cabrera wears a white beaded necklace that was made for him by his wife; because of this many gave him the nickname "Pearls". In 45 games with Cleveland, Cabrera batted .283 with nine doubles, two triples, three home runs and 22 RBI.

Cabrera made his postseason debut in Game 1 of the 2007 American League Division Series, and he finished the game 1-for-4 with a home run, walk and two runs scored in Cleveland's 12–3 win over the Yankees. In 11 playoff games, he batted .217 with a home run and 6 RBI, helping the Indians to the ALCS.

At Progressive Field on May 12, 2008, Cabrera turned the 14th unassisted triple play in MLB history against the Toronto Blue Jays in the second game of a doubleheader. In the fifth inning, with Toronto's Marco Scutaro on first base and Kevin Mench on second, Cabrera dove and caught a Lyle Overbay liner, stepped on second base before leading runner Mench could return, and then tagged Scutaro, who had already passed second base. Hall of Fame member Bob Feller was in attendance to witness Cabrera's feat. On June 9, 2008, Cabrera was optioned to Triple-A Buffalo after hitting a team low .184 with 14 RBI in 52 games. Barfield was called back up to take his place. During his stay in Buffalo, Cabrera hit .326 in 34 games with 25 runs, seven doubles, four home runs and 13 RBI. He was also named International League Batter of the Week after hitting .394 (13-for-33) with three doubles, three homers and 6 RBI. Cabrera was called back up to the Indians on July 18. He hit .320 with 13 doubles, five home runs and 33 RBI in 62 games after his recall. Overall, Cabrera finished the 2008 season batting .259 with six home runs and 47 RBI in 114 games.

Cabrera hit his first career grand slam against New York Yankees' pitcher Anthony Claggett to cap a 14-run second inning for the Indians on April 18, 2009, at the new Yankee Stadium, and had a career-high four hits with 5 RBI as the Indians went on to win 22–4. Through June 2, he was batting .316 with a team-high 38 runs, 13 doubles, 27 RBI and seven stolen bases. In that day's game against the Minnesota Twins, Cabrera sprained his shoulder in a collision with Twins shortstop Brendan Harris. He was placed on the disabled list the next day, and returned on June 28 against the Cincinnati Reds. In 131 games, Cabrera batted a career-high .308 with six home runs and 68 RBI. He also set a career-high with 17 stolen bases.

On May 17, 2010, at Tropicana Field, Cabrera suffered a broken left forearm that landed him on the disabled list. He later made two rehab starts on July 12 and 13, 2010 with the Mahoning Valley Scrappers, the Indians' Short-Season A affiliate, going a combined 2-for-6 with a walk, double, and 2 RBI in both games, the first a 10–5 loss and second a 4–2 win at Eastwood Field. Cabrera began his stint with the Double-A Akron Aeros on July 15, 2010, for more rehab work, before he was activated from the 60-day disabled list on July 20. For the season, Cabrera batted .276 with three home runs and 29 RBI in 97 games.

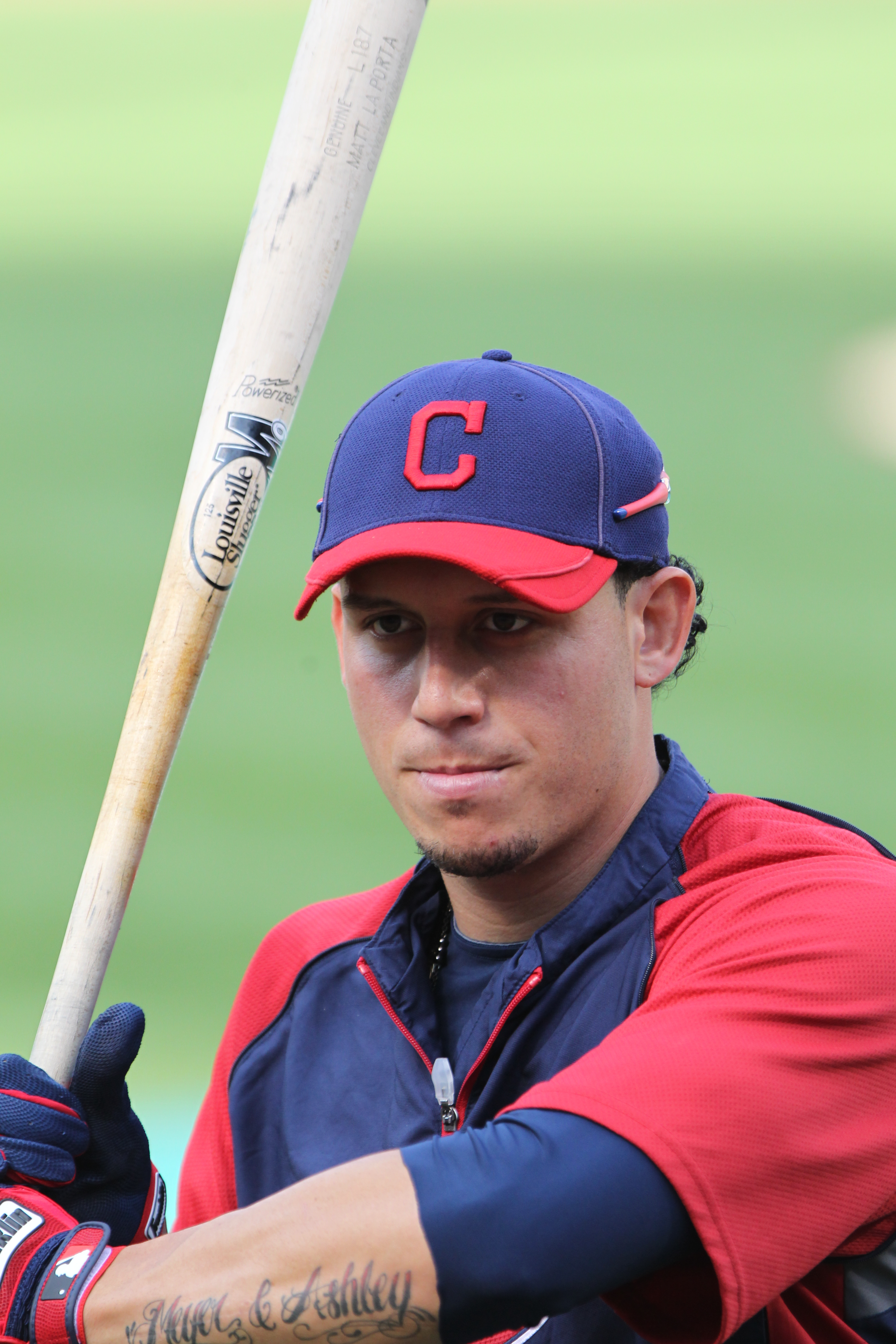
Cabrera with the Cleveland Indians in 2011

During the 2011 season, Cabrera hit 25 home runs (setting a franchise record for a shortstop) and recorded 92 RBI, both career highs. He also hit for a .273 average and stole 17 bases in 151 games, while making several highlight plays at the shortstop position. For his heroics, he earned his first All-Star appearance while receiving the Silver Slugger Award and the Indians Heart and Hustle Award. He was also named the team's Man of the Year by the Cleveland Chapter of the Baseball Writers' Association of America.

On February 10, 2012, Cabrera signed a one-year, $4.55 million deal with the Indians to avoid arbitration. In the process, Cabrera filed for $5.2 million, but the Indians submitted $3.75 million. He was the final Indian eligible for arbitration to be under contract, and he was under team control through 2013.

On April 4, 2012, Cabrera signed to a two-year, $16.5 million extension with a one-year club option that keeps him under Cleveland's control through 2014. On June 19, 2012, he hit a walk-off two-run home run off of Cincinnati Reds' closing pitcher Aroldis Chapman in the tenth inning, giving the Indians a 3–2 victory. It was Cabrera's second walk-off home run of his career. Cabrera was selected to appear in the 2012 MLB All-Star Game on July 1, 2012, as a reserve shortstop, joining teammate Chris Perez as one of two Indians voted to appear in the Midsummer Classic. Between the beginning of July and July 17, Cabrera's batting average had dropped 26 points (.300 on July 1 to .274 on July 17). Cabrera would record his first three-hit game since June 30 when he went 3-for-5 on July 18 against the Tampa Bay Rays. Two days later, Cabrera would hit his first home run of July and first since June 29 when he hit a solo shot against the Baltimore Orioles on July 20. By July 22, however, Cabrera's batting average reached a season-low .272. He ultimately finished the season batting .270 with 16 home runs and 68 RBI in 143 games.

On June 3, 2013, Cabrera strained his right quadriceps while running to first base during a 7–4 loss against the New York Yankees at Yankee Stadium and was placed on the 15-day disabled list. He was activated from the disabled list on June 26. In 136 games, Cabrera hit .242 with 14 home runs and 64 RBI. In the 2013 American League Wild Card Game, he finished the game 0-for-4 in Cleveland's loss to the Tampa Bay Rays.

Cabrera began the 2014 season batting .246 with nine home runs and 40 RBI in 97 games with Cleveland.

=== Washington Nationals (2014) ===
On July 31, 2014, the Indians traded Cabrera to the Washington Nationals for Zach Walters. Cabrera finished the 2014 season playing in 146 games with a batting average of .241 in 553 at-bats in 616 plate appearances while compiling 133 hits, 49 walks, 61 RBIs, 14 home runs and 74 runs scored with both the Indians and Nationals. Cabrera hit just .200 with a home run and 2 RBI in the 2014 National League Division Series as the Nationals lost the series to the San Francisco Giants in four games.

=== Tampa Bay Rays (2015) ===
On December 30, 2014, Cabrera signed a one-year, $7.5 million contract with the Tampa Bay Rays. Cabrera finished the 2015 season playing in 143 games, and hit .265 while compiling 134 hits, 36 walks, 15 home runs, 58 RBI, and 66 runs scored.

=== New York Mets (2016–2018) ===
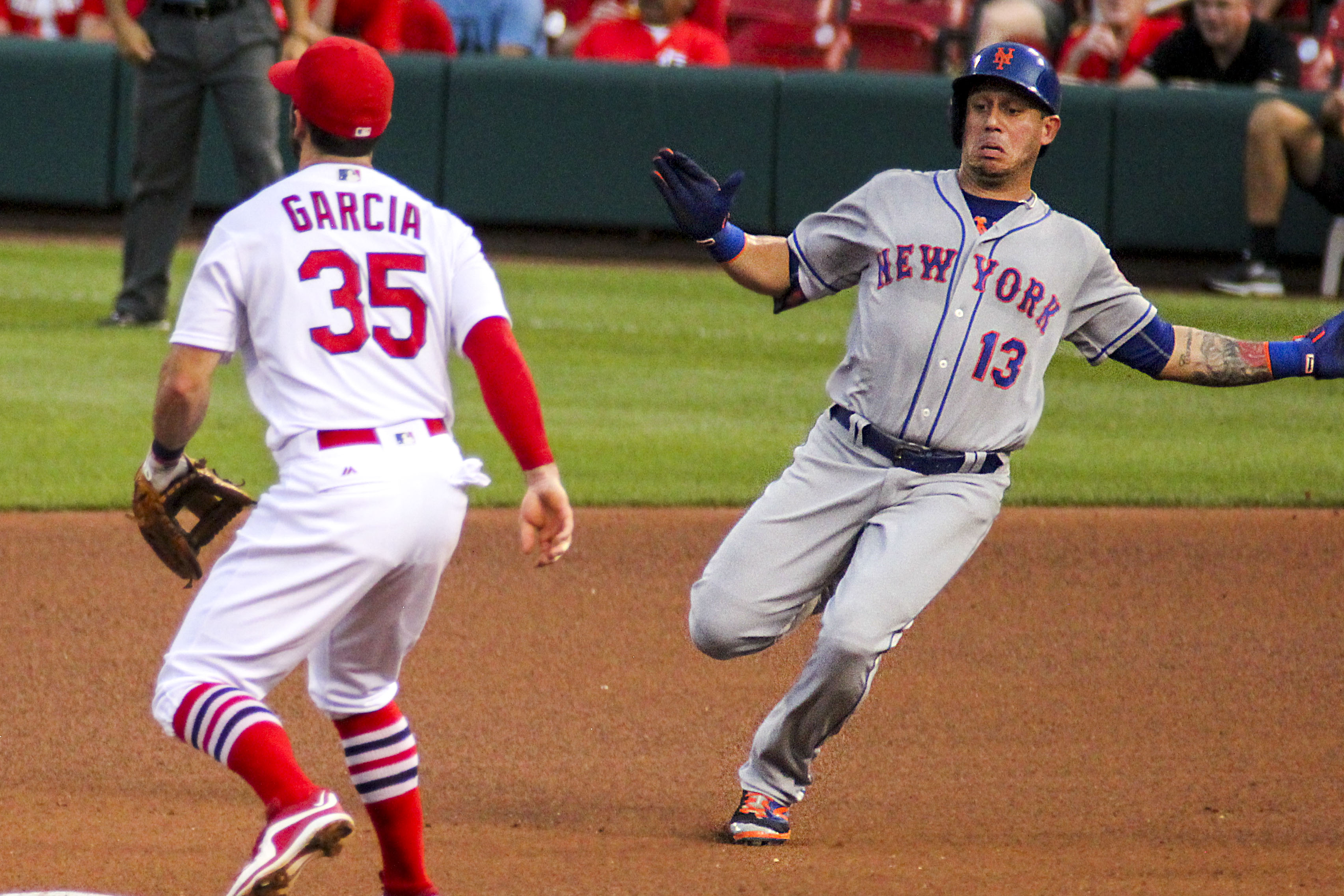
Cabrera playing for the Mets and sliding into second in St. Louis, 2016.

On December 10, 2015, Cabrera signed a two-year, $18.5 million contract with the New York Mets. His deal included a team option for third year. On July 31, 2016, Cabrera strained the patellar tendon in his left knee while rounding third base against the Colorado Rockies. He was placed on the disabled list on August 2. He returned from the disabled list on August 19. He was named National League Player of the Week for the week ending August 27. In a crucial game to make the playoffs, on September 22, 2016, Cabrera gave the Mets an 11th-inning win with a three-run home run, following a tight game against the Phillies. In 141 games, he batted .280 with 23 home runs and 62 RBI. Cabrera finished 1-for-3 and a walk in the Mets' loss to the San Francisco Giants in the 2016 National League Wild Card Game.

In 2017, Cabrera had two stints on the disabled list with a sprained left thumb. He ultimately finished the season batting .280 with 14 home runs and 59 RBI in 135 games. In the second half, Cabrera hit .307 in 72 games, including a .372 mark in September and October. Cabrera's option for 2018 was exercised by the Mets on November 3, 2017.

Cabrera began the 2018 season batting .277 with 18 home runs and 58 RBI in 98 games with the Mets.

=== Philadelphia Phillies (2018) ===
On July 27, 2018, Cabrera was traded to the Philadelphia Phillies in exchange for minor leaguer Franklyn Kilome. He made his Phillies debut a day later going 0-for-4 as the shortstop in a 6–2 loss to the Cincinnati Reds. With the Phillies, he batted .228/.286/.392 with five home runs and 17 RBI in 49 games.

=== Texas Rangers (2019) ===
On January 24, 2019, Cabrera signed a one-year contract with the Texas Rangers. On August 1, Cabrera was designated for assignment. On August 3, the Rangers released Cabrera. He batted .235/.318/.393 with 12 home runs and 51 RBI in 93 games with Texas.

=== Second stint with Washington Nationals (2019–2020) ===
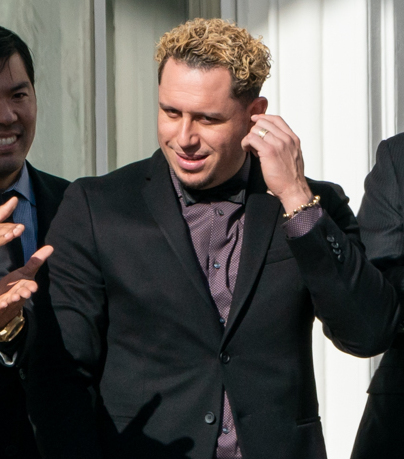
Cabrera celebrating the 2019 World Series win at the White House

On August 6, 2019, Cabrera signed with the Washington Nationals. He played in 38 games with Washington after the trade, and slashed .323/.404/.565 with six home runs and 40 RBI in just 124 at bats. Between Texas and Washington combined, he batted .260/.342/.441 with 18 home runs and 91 RBI in 447 at bats. The Nationals won the 2019 World Series, with Cabrera figuring on their roster at every stage of the postseason. He started at second base in the decisive Game 7 on October 30, 2019, at Minute Maid Park as the Nationals won the game 6–2, giving them their first championship in franchise history. In 12 playoff games, Cabrera hit .233 with 5 RBI.

Cabrera signed a one-year contract to stay with Washington on January 8, 2020. Cabrera played 52 games for Washington in 2020, slashing .242/.305/.447 with eight home runs and 31 RBI over 190 at-bats.

=== Arizona Diamondbacks (2021) ===
On February 21, 2021, Cabrera agreed to a one-year, $1.75 million contract with the Arizona Diamondbacks. In 90 games for the Diamondbacks, Cabrera hit .244 with seven home runs and 40 RBI.

=== Cincinnati Reds (2021) ===
On August 27, 2021, Cabrera was claimed off of waivers by the Cincinnati Reds. He finished 2-for-26 (.077) with two RBI in 20 games. He became a free agent following the 2021 season.

=== Venezuelan Winter League ===
On November 19, 2022, while playing for Caribes de Anzoátegui, Cabrera ignited a brawl in a game when he hit Carlos Castro in the head with a forearm while he was rounding first base during his third home run of the game. He received a 35-game suspension for his actions.

== Coaching career ==
On May 7, 2025, Cabrera was announced as the new manager for the Caribes de Anzoátegui of the Venezuelan Professional Baseball League for the 2025–26 season, replacing Morgan Ensberg. On May 9, El Águila de Veracruz of the Mexican League fired manager Néstor Rojas, with Cabrera being rumored to be the new hire; however the signing never materialized, with Enrique Sánchez and Jesús Valdez being hired as the team's interim managers.

On October 20, 2026, Cabrera was announced as the new manager for the Guerreros de Oaxaca of the Mexican League for the 2027 season.

== Personal life ==
Cabrera resides in Miami, Florida, with his wife Lismar, son Meyer, and daughter Ashley. He and his wife met in school in Venezuela and were married in 2007.

In April 2019, Cabrera and his wife became American citizens.

== See also ==
- List of Major League Baseball players from Venezuela
